= Thucydides Trap =

Theorised tendency towards war between emerging and existing powers

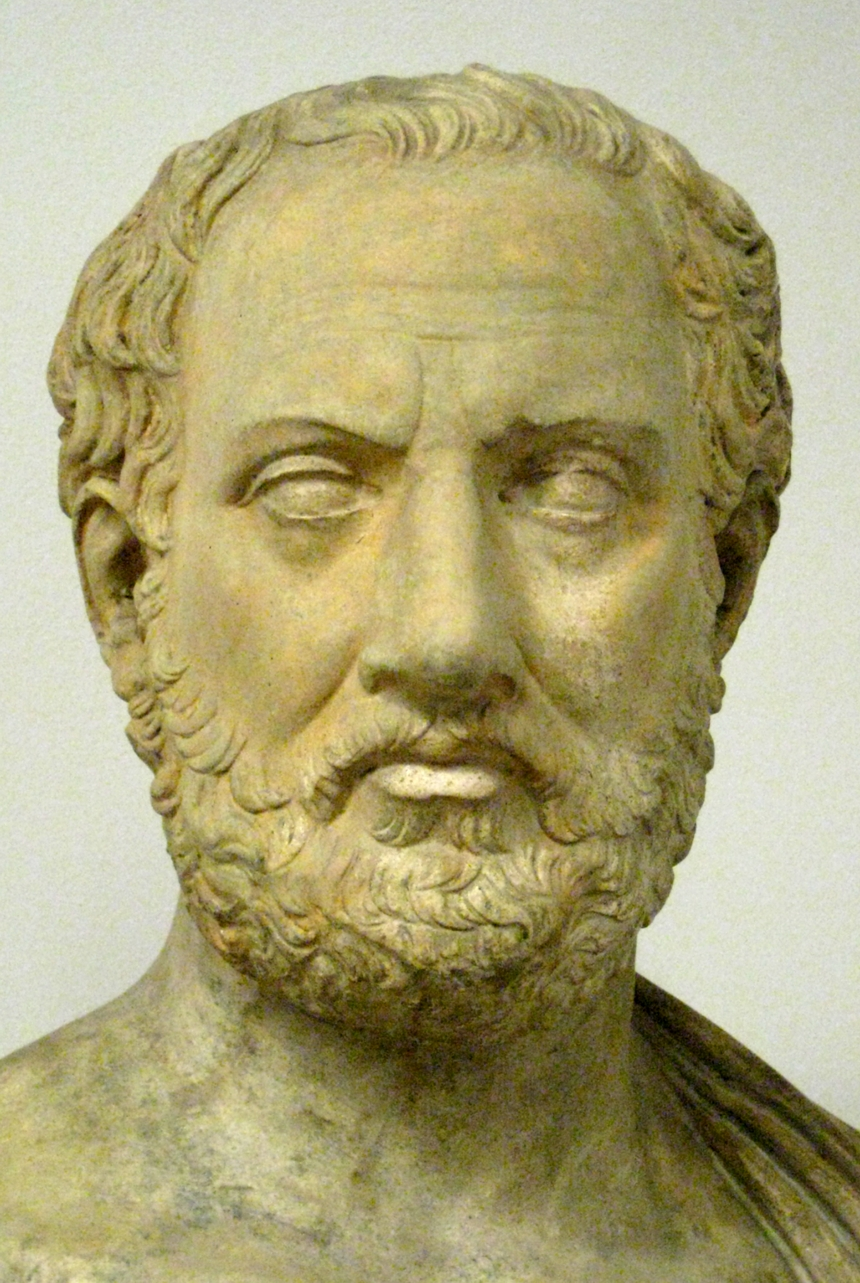
Bust of Thucydides, an Athenian historian and general of the 5th century BCE

The Thucydides Trap refers to the idea that when a rising power threatens to displace an established one, the result is often war. The concept originated with Herman Wouk, the novelist and World War II veteran, who used it in his Admiral Raymond A. Spruance lecture, delivered on April 16, 1980, at the U.S. Naval War College. Wouk compared the U.S.–Soviet Cold War to the "cold war" that developed between Athens and Sparta once they had defeated Persia, their common enemy, remarking:

And more than two millennia later we seem still trapped in Thucydides' world. None of the ways in which those quarrelsome Greeks behaved is suited to these dread times of nuclear menace; yet we still behave in those ways, and can find no other. How do we break out of this Thucydidean trap, which now threatens to strangle, if not to destroy, our world?

Decades later, the term was popularized by American political scientist Graham Allison to describe an apparent tendency towards war when an emerging power threatens to displace an existing great power as a regional or international hegemon. The term became widely used in 2015, being primarily applied to analysis of China–United States relations.

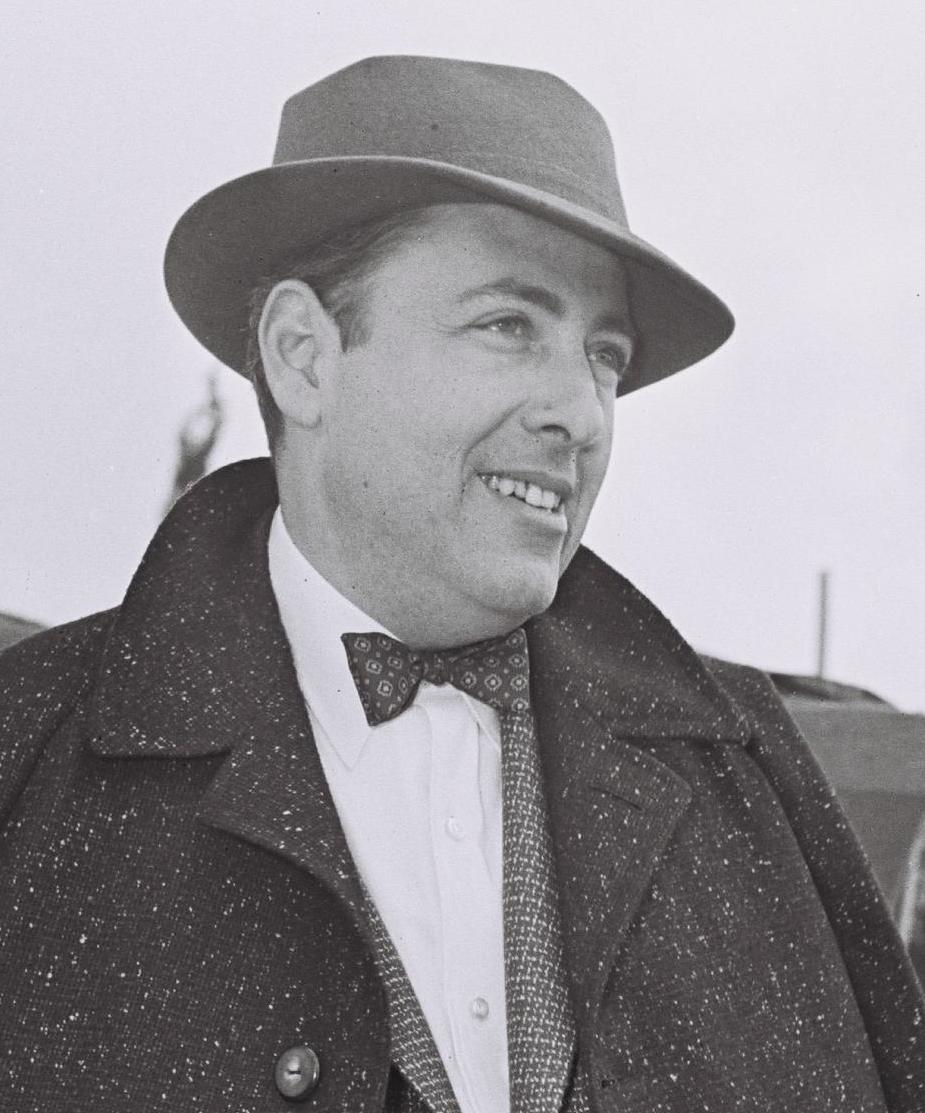
The concept originated in a lecture about the Cold War by Herman Wouk at the Naval War College in 1980

Supporting the thesis, Allison led a study at Harvard University's Belfer Center for Science and International Affairs which found that, among a sample of 16 historical instances of an emerging power rivaling a ruling power, 12 ended in war. That study, however, has come under considerable criticism, and scholarly opinion on the value of the Thucydides Trap concept—particularly as it relates to a potential military conflict between the United States and China—remains divided.

== Origin ==
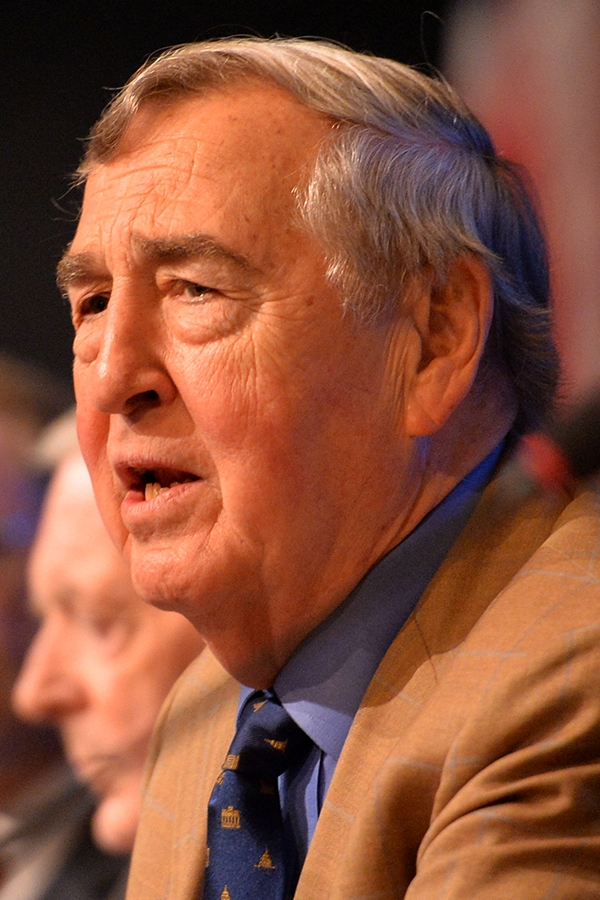
The term Thucydides Trap was revived by the American political scientist Graham Allison around 2011

The expression was inspired by the ancient Athenian historian and military commander Thucydides (died c. 400 BCE), used first in a speech by Herman Wouk in 1980, and then revived by the American political scientist Graham Allison around 2011. Wouk described the trap as a precedent for the 20th-century Cold War:

You remember that Athens and Sparta were the two great adversaries, the 'superpowers' of the Greek world; that they had allied themselves to fight off and defeat a common enemy, Persia; and that after the victory their alliance fell apart in a cold war.

Wouk lamented the recurrence of superpower rivalry, particularly in the nuclear age, but concluded that he found hope in two sources. First, he pointed backward in time from Thucydides to the Biblical age, and specifically to Isaiah's prophecy:

And they will beat their swords into plowshares and their spears into pruning hooks, nation shall not lift up its sword against nation, nor will they learn war anymore.

Second, Wouk pointed to the valor displayed by American and allied soldiers, such as Admiral Spruance, the namesake of his lecture, Jonathan Netanyahu, the leader of the Entebbe raid, and Walter "Butch" Williams, a Vietnam veteran and recipient of five Distinguished Service Crosses, who perished in a carrier accident:

In their deaths, I find embodied at once the sadness at the historic trap we are in, and the hope that mankind, which produced such courageous, noble, and clear-seeing spirits, will yet find its way to the light that was in them, and that burns for us.

Seizing on an observation by Thucydides in his History of the Peloponnesian War that "it was the rise of Athens and the fear that this instilled in Sparta that made war inevitable" (or, in the translation by Richard Crawley, "The growth of the power of Athens, and the alarm which this inspired in Lacedaemon, made war inevitable"), Allison used the term to describe a tendency towards war when a rising power (such as Athens) challenges the status of a ruling power (such as Sparta). Allison expanded on this idea in his 2017 book Destined for War, in which he argued that "China and the US are currently on a collision course for war". Though Allison argues in Destined for War that war between a "ruling power" and "rising power" is not inevitable, war may be very difficult to avoid and requires extensive and intensive diplomatic attention and exertion in the case of a "Thucydides trap".

== Definition ==
For Wouk, the trap is that pending the fulfillment of Isaiah's prophesy, superpowers will continue to take up arms against each other, leaving the United States to depend on those who "stand in the breach" and "serve." Despite the sadness of this predicament, Wouk believed that the United States was fortunate in that "[t]here are hundreds of Spruances in this country. And there are hundreds of young Netanyahus in Israel, and in America there are thousands of Butch Williamses."

For Allison, the term describes the theory that when a great power's position as hegemon is threatened by an emerging power, there is a significant likelihood of war between the two powers. In Allison's words:

Thucydides's Trap refers to the natural, inevitable discombobulation that occurs when a rising power threatens to displace a ruling power ... the resulting structural stress makes a violent clash the rule, not the exception.

To advance his thesis, Allison led a case study by Harvard University's Belfer Center for Science and International Affairs which found that among 16 historical instances of an emerging power rivaling a ruling power, 12 ended in war. (Note: The study has faced considerable criticism. See § Methodological criticisms.) The cases included in Allison's original study are listed in the following table:

Thucydides Trap case file
Case number	Period	Ruling power	Rising power	Result
1	Late 15th century	Portugal	Spain	No war
2	First half of 16th century	France	Spain	War
3	16th and 17th centuries	Spain	Ottoman Empire	War
4	First half of 17th century	Spain	Sweden	War
5	Mid-to-late 17th century	Dutch Republic	England	War
6	Late 17th to mid-18th centuries	France	Great Britain	War
7	Late 18th and early 19th centuries	United Kingdom	France	War
8	Mid-19th century	France and United Kingdom	Russia	War
9	Mid-19th century	France	Germany	War
10	Late 19th and early 20th centuries	China and Russia	Japan	War
11	Early 20th century	United Kingdom	United States	No war
12	Early 20th century	United Kingdom (supported by France, Russia)	Germany	War
13	Mid-20th century	Soviet Union, France, and United Kingdom	Germany	War
14	Mid-20th century	United States	Japan	War
15	1940s–1980s	United States	Soviet Union	Cold (proxy) war / economic/trade war
16	1990s–present	United Kingdom and France	Germany	No war

== Influence ==
The term and arguments surrounding it have had influence in international media (including Chinese state media) and among American and Chinese politicians.

After Allison revived the term in the early 2010s, only Chinese scholars pointed out that it had first been used by Wouk -- e.g., Executive Dean of the Chongyang Institute for Financial Studies at Renmin University of China Wang Wen connected the two usages in a 2016 article called "'Internal strength competition' will become the key to Sino-US competition:"

In the 1980s, American writer Herman Wouk warned of the disastrous consequences of the Cold War between the US and the Soviet Union using the "Thucydides Trap" analogy. On August 22, 2012, Harvard University Professor Graham Allison, in the Financial Times, revived the historical metaphor of the "Thucydides Trap," reigniting anxieties among Western academics, particularly American researchers, about American decline and concerns about China's rise.

A case study of the term by Alan Greeley Misenheimer published by the Institute for National Strategic Studies, the military research arm of the National Defense University, stated that it "has received global attention since entering the international relations lexicon". Foreign policy scholars Hal Brands and Michael Beckley have stated that the Thucydides Trap has "become canonical", a "truism now invoked, ad nauseam, in explaining U.S.–China rivalry". Furthermore, BBC diplomatic correspondent Jonathan Marcus has quipped that Allison's book expanding on the Thucydides Trap, Destined For War, "has become required reading for many policymakers, academics and journalists".

=== China–United States relations ===
The term is today primarily used and was revived by Allison in relation to a potential military conflict between the United States and the People's Republic of China. Chinese leader and CCP general secretary Xi Jinping referenced the term, cautioning that "We all need to work together to avoid the Thucydides trap." The term gained further influence in 2018 as a result of an increase in US-Chinese tensions after US President Donald Trump imposed tariffs on almost half of China's exports to the US, leading to a trade war.

Western scholars have noted that there are a number of pressing issues the two nations are at odds over that increase the likelihood of the two powers falling into the Thucydides trap, including the continued de facto independence of Taiwan supported by Western countries, China's digital policing and its use of cyber espionage, differing policies towards North Korea, China's increased naval presence in the Pacific and its claims over the South China Sea, and human rights issues in Xinjiang, Tibet, and Hong Kong. Some also point to the consolidation of power by Xi Jinping, the belief in an irreconcilable differences in values, and the trade deficit as further evidence the countries may be slipping into the Thucydides trap. Foreign Times, however, argues that Bejing believes China can escape the Thucydides Trap because the United States will weaken internally before a confrontation becomes inevitable.

Xi asked Trump during a May 2026 summit in China if their two nations could avoid the trap. During a state visit by Xi Jinping to the United States in September 2026 Xi again warned Trump about the risk of the Thucydides trap leading to military confrontation between USA and China.

== Criticism ==
=== China–United States relations ===
A number of scholars have criticized the application of the Thucydides trap to US–China relations. Lawrence Freedman, writing in Prism, the National Defense University's journal of complex operations, has similarly argued that "China's main interest has always been its regional position, and if that is the case, then there are strong arguments for it to show patience, as its economic pull becomes progressively stronger." Hu Bo, a professor at Peking University's Institute of Ocean Research and one of China's foremost naval strategists, has also said that he does not believe the current balance of power between the United States and China supports the Thucydides hypothesis.

Scholars and journalists like Arthur Waldron and Ian Buruma contended in 2017 that China is still far too weak for such a conflict, pointing to China's "economic vulnerabilities", its aging population, an exodus of Chinese people out of China, domestic ecological problems, an inferior military relative to the United States, a weaker system of alliances than the United States, and a censorship regime that limits innovation. Foreign policy scholars Hal Brands and Michael Beckley have similarly argued in 2021 that the Thucydides Trap "fundamentally misdiagnoses where China now finds itself on its arc of development", contending that it is China—and not the United States—that faces impending stagnation. Relatedly, Harvard University political scientist Joseph S. Nye argued in 2017 that the primary concern is not the rise of China leading to a Thucydides trap, but rather domestic issues leading to a weakening of China in what he calls a Kindleberger Trap.

Others have derided the Thucydides Trap as a quaint piece of ancient history that is not particularly applicable to modern times. James Palmer, a deputy editor at Foreign Policy, in his article "Oh God, Not the Peloponnesian War Again", wrote of the Thucydides Trap that "conflicts between city-states in a backwater Eurasian promontory 2,400 years ago are an unreliable guide to modern geopolitics—and they neglect a vast span of world history that may be far more relevant". He further derisively noted that Thucydides should not "hold the same grip on international relations scholars that Harry Potter does on millennial readers". Lawrence Freedman has similarly argued that "[t]he case studies deployed by Allison", which "come from times when issues of war and power were viewed differently than they are today", tell us "very little of value", concluding that "the Thucydides Trap is an unhelpful construct".

Scholar David Daokui Li writes that the Thucydides Trap theory is flawed as applied to US–China relations, because the model is based on Western and Ancient Greek analogies. In Li's view, examples such as Germany in the 1910s are considerably different from contemporary China.

Finally, some have noted that Chinese state propaganda outlets have adopted the narrative of the Thucydides Trap in order to promote a set of power relations that favors China.

=== Methodological criticisms ===
==== Criticism of research into the Thucydides Trap ====
The research by Graham Allison supporting the Thucydides trap has been criticized. Harvard University political scientist Joseph S. Nye has contested the claim that 12 of the 16 historical cases of a rising power rivaling a ruling power resulted in war on the basis that Allison misidentifies cases. For example, he points to the case of World War I, which Allison identifies as an instance of an emerging Germany rivaling a hegemonic United Kingdom, saying that the war was also caused by "the fear in Germany of Russia's growing power, the fear of rising Slavic nationalism in a declining Austria-Hungary, as well as myriad other factors that differed from ancient Greece". Historian Arthur Waldron has similarly argued that Allison mischaracterizes several conflicts. For example, he says of the Japan–Russia conflict included by Allison: "Japan was the rising power in 1904 while Russia was long established. Did Russia therefore seek to preempt Japan? No. The Japanese launched a surprise attack on Russia, scuttling the Czar's fleet." Lawrence Freedman, writing in Prism, the National Defense University's journal of complex operations, has likewise argued that Allison misunderstands the causes of several of his case studies, particularly World War I, which he argues resulted more from "the dispute between Austria and Serbia, and its mismanagement by their allies, Germany and Russia".

Professors Jay Parker and Andrew Novo argue that Allison's interpretation of the theory of "hegemonic transition" incorrectly characterizes the distribution of power between Athens and Sparta and focuses too much on structural elements to the detriment of the strategic choices of leaders within both those powers.

Foreign policy scholars Hal Brands and Michael Beckley have argued that, for many of the cases Allison identifies with the Thucydides Trap, the impetus that led to war was not the impending threat of a hegemonic power being surpassed but rather an emerging power lashing out when its rapid rise turned into stagnation. They write:

[T]he calculus that produces war—particularly the calculus that pushes revisionist powers, countries seeking to shake up the existing system, to lash out violently—is more complex (than the Thucydides Trap). A country whose relative wealth and power are growing will surely become more assertive and ambitious. All things equal, it will seek greater global influence and prestige. But if its position is steadily improving, it should postpone a deadly showdown with the reigning hegemon until it has become even stronger ... Now imagine a different scenario. A dissatisfied state has been building its power and expanding its geopolitical horizons. But then the country peaks, perhaps because its economy slows, perhaps because its own assertiveness provokes a coalition of determined rivals, or perhaps because both of these things happen at once. The future starts to look quite forbidding; a sense of imminent danger starts to replace a feeling of limitless possibility. In these circumstances, a revisionist power may act boldly, even aggressively, to grab what it can before it is too late. The most dangerous trajectory in world politics is a long rise followed by the prospect of a sharp decline.

They claim that several of Allison's cases in fact follow this pattern—and not that of the Thucydides Trap—including the Russo-Japanese War, World War I, and the Pacific War (they also point to America's imperial foray after the American Civil War and modern-day Russia under Vladimir Putin). They further claim that it is this effect that is more likely to push the United States and China into conflict, as China is "slowing economically and facing growing global resistance".

Classicist Victor Davis Hanson challenges the theory, noting that a rising power does not always provoke a preemptive attack from an established power. He cites fundamental differences between states as a key factor, explaining why such a dynamic did not emerge between the UK and the US despite the latter's rise but is evident in the tensions between the US and China due to their contrasting political and economic systems.

==== Peloponnesian War ====
In addition to criticizing Allison's knowledge of East Asian history, reviewers also criticized his knowledge of ancient Greek history. Harvard University political scientist Joseph Nye, pointing to research by Yale historian Donald Kagan, has argued that Graham Allison misinterprets the Peloponnesian War (431–404 BCE); Nye argues that the war was not the result of a rising Athens challenging Sparta, but rather the consequence of Athenian stagnation leading Sparta to think that a number of "Athenian policy mistakes" made war "worth the risk". Historian Arthur Waldron likewise argued that Kagan and Harvard classics scholar Ernst Badian had "long ago proved that no such thing exists as the 'Thucydides Trap'" with regards to the Peloponnesian War. Relatedly, political scientists Athanassios Platias and Vasilis Trigkas submitted that the Thucydides Trap is based on "inadvertent escalation" whereas the Peloponnesian war was an outcome of rational calculations.

Others have questioned Allison's reading of Thucydides. In a case study for the Institute for National Strategic Studies, the military research arm of the National Defense University, Alan Greeley Misenheimer says that "Thucydides' text does not support Allison's normative assertion about the 'inevitable' result of an encounter between 'rising' and 'ruling' powers" and, while it "draws welcome attention both to Thucydides and to the pitfalls of great power competition", it "fails as a heuristic device or predictive tool in the analysis of contemporary events".

Academic Jeffrey Crean writes that Allison misunderstands the core lesson of Thucydides, that the greatest threat to a hegemon comes from within. Thucydides couched his history as a dramatic tragedy, with the turning point coming when a hubristic Athens sought to conquer Syracuse, which was far from any Athenian possessions or interests. For Thucydides, the Athenian attempt to conquer Syracuse was an example of democracy devolving into mob psychology and a failure that ultimately allowed Sparta to win.

== See also ==
- China's peaceful rise
- Chinese Century
- Historic recurrence
- Kindleberger Trap
- Offshore balancing
- Potential superpowers
- Power transition theory
