= Comprehensive National Power =

Measure of the general power of a nation-state

Comprehensive National Power (CNP; Chinese: 综合国力, pinyin: zōnghé guólì) is a measure of the general power of a nation-state. It is a putative measure, important in the contemporary political thought of the People's Republic of China from the 1980s onwards and first introduced into official documents in 1992.

CNP can be calculated numerically by combining various quantitative indices to create a single number held to measure the power of a nation-state. These indices take into account military, political, economic and cultural factors.

== About ==
Inspired by F. Clifford German, J. David Singer, Stuart Bremer and John Stuckey, A.F.K. Organski and Jacek Kugler, and Ray Cline's understanding and formulas for national power assessment. It builds upon concepts such as superpower and regional power, as well as soft power, hard power and smart power.

A 1995 definition of CNP refers to it as "the totality of a country's economic, military and political power in a given period. It signals the country's comprehensive development level and its position in the international system."

In the Chinese context, CNP refers collectively to types of power, including discourse power, that make a country more or less powerful. There are a number of methods for calculating CNP devised by the Chinese Academy of Social Sciences, Chinese Military Academy, Chinese Institute of Contemporary International Relations and independent Chinese scholars.

== National strategic resources ==
Michael Porter lists five major resources, that is, physical, human, infrastructure, knowledge and capital resources. Accordingly, the national strategic resources are divided into eight categories, with 23 indictors. Those categories constitute CNP:

- Economic resources
- Natural resources
- Capital resources
- Knowledge and Technology resources
- Government resources
- Military resources
- International resources
- Cultural resources

== Adaptations ==
A fairly simplistic and effective index was developed by Chin-Lung Chang. It uses critical mass, economic capacity and military capacity. Due to its indicators, it is often repeatable and easy to define, making it comparable to the Human Development Index in understanding and reliability.

== See also ==
- Composite Index of National Capability
- Power in international relations
