= Walter Clemens =

American political scientist (born 1933)

Walter C. Clemens
- Born: April 6, 1933 (age 93); Cincinnati, Ohio, U.S.
- Occupation: Historian

Academic background
- Education: University of Vienna; Notre Dame University; Columbia University
- Thesis: Origins of the Soviet Campaign for Disarmament (1961)
- Doctoral advisor: Henry L. Roberts; Alexander Dallin

Walter Carl Clemens, Jr. (born April 6, 1933) is an American political scientist known for advancing complexity science as an approach to the study of international relations and for arms control and U.S. relations with communist and post-communist countries Some observers call him a "cold warrior for peace."

Clemens is an Associate at Harvard University's Davis Center for Russian and Eurasian Studies and Professor Emeritus at Boston University.

He has authored numerous books, articles, and editorials. Since 2008, he has been a regular contributor to Global Asia, the quarterly journal of the East Asia Foundation.

Clemens is also an artist, who draws on influences from many cultures and seeks to bring out what is true, good, and beautiful. His paintings can be seen at www.waltclemens.art.

== Biography ==
Clemens studied art and art history at the University of Vienna, 1952–53, before graduating from Notre Dame University magna cum laude in 1955. Under a Ford Foundation fellowship Clemens studied at Columbia University, 1955–61. He did research for his dissertation on Soviet disarmament policy under Lenin at Moscow State University (1958–59), and at the Hoover Institution (1959). At Columbia, he received a master's degree and Certificate of the Russian Institute in 1957 and a Ph.D. in International Relations in 1961. Clemens grew up in Cincinnati, Ohio, graduating first in his class in 1951 from Purcell High School, where he also played tackle on the state champion football team.

== Professional career ==
Since the 1960s, Clemens has taught at a number of academic institutions, including Iolani School in Honolulu, Hawaii, the University of California, Santa Barbara, the Massachusetts Institute of Technology, and Boston University, where, since 2012, he is Professor Emeritus of Political Science. Since 1963, Clemens has been an Associate at Harvard University's Davis Center for Russian and Eurasian Studies. He was also an Associate at the Harvard University Belfer Center for Science and International Affairs, 1986–2003. Clemens's papers are housed at the Howard Gotlieb Archival Research Center at Boston University. His work has been supported by four major grants from the Ford Foundation and two from the Rockefeller Foundation. His research was supported also by the University of California, MIT, Columbia, Harvard, Boston University, and the East–West Center in Honolulu, and by several government agencies including NASA, the U.S. Arms Control and Disarmament Agency, the U.S. State Department, the Fulbright-Hays Program, and NATO. Clemens has reviewed for New York Journal of Books since 2017. From 2014 to 2022, he was Book Review Editor for the journal Asian Perspective. From 1982, he belonged to the Usage Panel of the American Heritage Dictionary until it ended in 2018. Starting in 2021, he has been a frequent contributor to Europe's Edge, e.g., https://cepa.org/article/totalitarians-choke-growth-as-well-as-freedom-nob

== Arms control and security studies ==
Clemens has also made contributions to the study of arms control in U.S. relations with the USSR, China, and North Korea. As Executive Officer of the White House Committee on Arms Control and Disarmament for International Cooperation Year 1965, Clemens drafted the committee's proposal, "3-Year Moratorium urged on Antimissile Missiles." In the 1980s, Clemens conducted surveys showing that most Americans erroneously believed that their country was protected by an effective missile defense shield. Clemens treated this as a dangerous illusion.

== Soviet and post-Soviet studies ==
Having participated in the first exchange of U.S. and Soviet graduate students in 1958–59, Clemens became one of the first specialists to study Soviet arms control policies. As the Soviet system entered its final years, he wrote Can Russia Change? The USSR Confronts Global Interdependence (1990) and Baltic Independence and Russian Empire (1991). In a review for Foreign Affairs, John C. Campbell wrote of Can Russia Change? that "the main argument for relations of 'complex interdependence' is clear and convincing".

In Baltic Independence, Clemens argued that the Singing Revolution of the three Baltic nations gave a coup de grâce to the Soviet system. The Foreign Affairs review of Baltic Interdependence expressed: "[t]his book, better than any other, tells how the local communist parties tried and failed to adapt to the growing popular demands for national self-determination." A review in Lituanus described Baltic Interdependence as "the only current scholarly work which succinctly summarizes the troubled histories of the Baltic nations, including the complicated negotiations for independence during the years 1917–1920". Based on what he observed in the Soviet empire, Clemens was one of the few scholars to anticipate the imminent collapse of the Soviet system. Later analyzing a decade of post-Soviet development, Clemens wrote The Baltic Transformed: Complexity Theory and European Security (2001).

Following Russia's invasions of Ukraine and China's actions in Xinjiang and the South China Sea, Clemens published many critical essays in Europe's Edge and other periodicals. Moscow's growing ties with Pyongyang as well as Beijing led Clemens to write about the emerging totalitarian axis.

In 2023 he wrote Blood Debts: What Putin and Xi Owe Their Victims. Reviewing this book in Global Asia (December 2023) professor Mel Gurtov observed that Clemens looks beyond Putin and Xi to a new order for the Russian and Chinese people, based on adoption by successor governments of Immanuel Kant's three foundations for "perpetual peace" - republican government, international law under a federation of free states and respect for human rights." This may seem unachievable, but Clemens reminds readers how post-war Germany and Japan embraced democratic institutions.

Clemens also addressed problems within the United States. In 2023 he published The Republican War on America: Dangers of Trump and Trumpism. Professor Matthew Weiss termed the book, "a timely, rich, and insightful contribution to our understanding of the components, causes and consequences of Trumpism." It is "an essential resource for all those who wish to learn more about the underpinnings, inner workings, and the tenets of Trumpism, and how the rot of Trump and Trumpism have debased the American presidency, tarnished the Republican Party, and shaken the democratic foundations of the U.S. to its core."

== Scholarship on North and South Korea ==
Clemens is also an authority on North Korea. He is on the editorial board of Asian Perspective, where he writes a book review essay for each issue. He has written many articles on North Korea and on China for the Journal of East Asian Studies, Global Asia and The Diplomat (on-line).

Analyzing events at the eastern edge of the former Soviet sphere, Clemens asked what lessons, if any, from the U.S.-Soviet experience might apply to arms control negotiations with North Korea. He published Getting to Yes in Korea (with a foreword by the late Gov. Bill Richardson). This was the first book to systematically apply theories of international relations, complexity and negotiation to the goal of stemming North Korea's nuclear program. The book used scenarios methodology - not to predict the future, but to outline alternative futures. What combinations of circumstances make each scenario more likely? What actions can avoid the worst of these, and what actions improve the likelihood of better ones." The book listed recommendations on how to foster a more secure and prosperous world. The book was praised as a negotiation manual by Graham Allison and Terence Roehrig, but a Canadian reviewer wanted more specific (and self-assured) policy guidelines.

Asking whether and how the West should negotiate with brutal dictatorship, Clemens on February 3, 2011 gave the Glasmcher Lecture in Ottawa, Canada, at the Symposium on Conflict Resolution. The lecture title was "Can-Should-Must We Negotiate with Evil?"

== Complexity science ==
In 2004, Clemens published the second edition of Dynamics of International Relations (Rowman & Littlefield, 2004). The book presents a new approach to the study of international relations and has become an increasingly popular alternative to more traditional international relations course texts. Dynamics of International Relations has received professional praise from a wide spectrum of scholars and practitioners, including Governor Bill Richardson, Zbigniew Brzezinski, J. Ann Tickner, Michael W. Doyle and David Singer.

Clemens tried to use complexity theory to explain some facets of international relations. His major work on this topic is Complexity Science and World Affairs (State University of New York Press, 2013). This book, according to S. Fredrick Starr at the School for Advanced International Studies, "offers a fresh, even startling, paradigm and process for analyzing the seemingly unpredictable relations within and among human societies. With impressive clarity he proposes that 'the capacity to cope with complexity' has become a key determinant of success in our intricately interrelated world." In a similar vein, Jacek Kugler (professor at Claremont Graduate University and former president of the International Studies Association) wrote that "this breakthrough book provides a new, promising general paradigm exploring and explaining the complexity of world politics. For scholars and analysts pushing the boundaries of our field, this is a must-read volume."

The two books published in 2023 cited above on Putin and Xi, and Trumpism present a much darker view of reality cognizant of a global shift toward authoritarianism and abuse of human rights.

== Honors, awards and professional leadership ==
- Research Fellow, East-West Center, University of Hawaii, 2006;
- Fulbright-Hayes Research-Lecturing Award, University of Ljubljana, 2005;
- Usage Panel, American Heritage Dictionary, 1982–2018;
- International Advisory Board, Sakharov Archives, Brandeis University, 2001–04;
- Fellow, Södertörns University College, Stockholm, 1999;
- Fulbright Distinguished Lecturer on Arms Control, China, 1999–2000;
- International Advisory Board, Russian Science Foundation, 1992–95;
- Committee on Comparative and Interdisciplinary Studies, International Studies Association, 1993–95;
- Grantee, Russian Littoral Project, University of Maryland and SAIS, 1993;
- Fellow, Council on Economic Priorities, 1990;
- Lecturer, U.S. Information Service Specialist Programs, Europe (1976, 1992), Asia (1970, 1982–83), Latin America (1976);
- Fulbright Lecturer, University of the West Indies, Trinidad, 1977–78;
- Lecturer at the Salzburg Seminar in American Studies, Austrian Diplomatic Academy, Academy of Science in Hungary (also in Estonia and Georgia), and three universities in Argentina.

== Partial list of publications ==
=== Books, chapters and edited volumes ===
- Blood Debts: What Putin and Xi Owe Their Victims. (Washington DC: Westphalia Press, 2023), xv + 246 p.
- The Republican War on America: Dangers of Trump and Trumpism (Washington DC: Westphalia Press, 2023)
- Complexity Science and World Affairs, Foreword by Stuart A. Kauffman (Albany: State University of New York Press, 2013)
- Getting to Yes in Korea, Foreword by Gov. Bill Richardson (Boulder, Co.: Paradigm Publishers, 2010); Korean language edition (Seoul: Hanul, 2010)
- Ambushed! A Cartoon History of the George W. Bush Administration, with Jim Morin (Boulder, Co.: Paradigm Publishers, 2008)
- Dynamics of International Relations: Conflict and Mutual Gain in An Era of Global Interdependence. 2d ed. (Lanham, Md.: Rowman & Littlefield, 2004).
- Bushed! What Passionate Conservatives Have Done to America and the World, with Jim Morin. (Skaneateles, N.Y.: Outland Books, 2004)
- The Baltic Transformed: Complexity Theory and European Security, Foreword by Jack F. Matlock, Jr. (Lanham, Md.: Rowman & Littlefield, 2001).
- America and the World, 1898–2025: Achievements, Failures, Alternative Futures (New York: St. Martin's, 2000)
- Baltic Independence and Russian Empire (New York: St. Martin's, 1991)
- Can Russia Change? The USSR Confronts Global Interdependence (New York: Routledge, 1990 and Routledge Classics edition, 2011)
- The U.S.S.R. and Global Interdependence: Alternative Futures (Washington, D.C.: American Enterprise Institute, 1978)
- The Superpowers and Arms Control: From Cold War to Interdependence (Lexington, Mass.: Lexington Books, 1973)
- The Prospects for Peace, 1973–1977, computer data file and codebook at International Relations Archive, Inter-University Consortium for Political Research, University of Michigan (1973), ICPSR 5803
- "Die Tschechoslowakei unter Husak", Aus Politik und Zeitgeschichte, Supplement, Das Parlament (Bonn) B24/70 (June 13, 1970)
- The Arms Race and Sino-Soviet Relations (Stanford: The Hoover Institution, 1968)
- Outer Space and Arms Control (Cambridge: The M.I.T. Center for Space Research, 1966)
- Principal investigator, with Lincoln P. Bloomfield and Franklyn Griffiths, Khrushchev and the Arms Race: Soviet Interests in Arms Control and Disarmament, 1954–1964 (Cambridge: The M.I.T. Press, 1966)
- Ed. and Introduction, Toward a Strategy of Peace, Foreword by Robert F. Kennedy (Chicago: Rand McNally, 1965)
- Ed. and Introduction, World Perspectives on International Politics (Boston: Little, Brown & Co., 1965)
- "Soviet Disarmament Policy, 1917–1963: An Annotated Bibliography of Soviet and Western Sources" (Stanford: The Hoover Institution, 1965)
