= Power (international relations) =

Concept in international relations

Power in international relations is defined as the ability of a state to direct the actions of another state. The concept has been defined in various ways. Definitions of state power emphasize economic and military power. Other definitions of power emphasize the ability to structure and constitute the nature of social relations between actors. Power is an attribute of particular actors in their interactions, as well as a social process that constitutes the social identities and capacities of actors.

International relations scholars use the term polarity to describe the distribution of power in the international system. Unipolarity refers to an international system characterized by one hegemon (e.g. the United States in the post–Cold War era), bipolarity to an order with two great powers or blocs of states (e.g. the Cold War), and multipolarity refers to the presence of three or more great powers.

== Concepts of political power ==
Michael Barnett and Raymond Duvall define power as "the production, in and through social relations, of effects that shape the capacities of actors to determine their circumstances and fate". They reject definitions of power that conflate power as any and all effects because doing so makes power synonymous with causality. They also reject persuasion as part of the definition of power, as it revolves around actors freely and voluntarily changing their minds once presented with new information.

Political scientists, historians, and practitioners of international relations (diplomats) have viewed power in reference to status, which some states or actors possess and others do not.

=== Power as a goal ===
The view that hegemony is a goal in international relations has long been discussed by political theorists. Philosophers such as Thucydides, Niccolò Machiavelli, Thomas Hobbes and Hans Morgenthau are thought to have provided a realistic portrait of this political aim. Especially among Classical Realist thinkers, political dominance is the aim of nation states. The German military thinker Carl von Clausewitz is considered to be the quintessential projection of European growth across the continent. In more modern times, Claus Moser has elucidated theories of the distribution of power in Europe after the Holocaust, and the power of universal learning as its counterpoint. Jean Monnet was a French left-wing social theorist, stimulating expansive Eurocommunism, who followed on the creator of modern European community, the diplomat and statesman Robert Schuman.

=== Power as influence ===
NATO accounts for 55% of global military expenditure, with the United States alone accounting for 37% of global military expenditure in 2023.

Under certain circumstances, states can organize a sphere of influence or a bloc within which they exercise predominant influence. Historical examples include the spheres of influence recognized under the Concert of Europe, or the recognition of spheres during the Cold War following the Yalta Conference. The Eastern Bloc, the Western Bloc, and the Non-Aligned Movement were the blocs that arose out of the Cold War contest. Military alliances like NATO and the Warsaw Pact are another forum through which influence is exercised. However, "realist" theory attempted to maintain the balance of power from the development of meaningful diplomatic relations that can create a hegemony within the region. British foreign policy, for example, dominated Europe through the Congress of Vienna after the defeat of France. They continued the balancing act with the Congress of Berlin in 1878, to appease Russia and Germany from attacking Turkey. Britain has sided against the aggressors on the European continent—i.e. the German Empire, Nazi Germany, Napoleonic France or the Austrian Empire, known during World War I as the Central Powers and, in World War II as the Axis powers.

International orders have both a material and social component. Martha Finnemore argues that unipolarity does not just entail a material superiority by the unipole, but also a social structure whereby the unipole maintains its status through legitimation, and institutionalization. In trying to obtain legitimacy from the other actors in the international system, the unipole necessarily gives those actors a degree of power. The unipole also obtains legitimacy and wards off challenges to its power through the creation of institutions, but these institutions also entail a diffusion of power away from the unipole. David Lake has argued along similar lines that legitimacy and authority are key components of international order.

Susan Strange made a key contribution to International Political Economy on the issue of power, which she considered essential to the character and dynamics of the global economy. Strange was skeptical of static indicators of power, arguing that it was structural power that mattered. In particular, interactions between states and markets mattered. She pointed to the superiority of the American technology sector, dominance in services, and the position of the U.S. dollar as the top international currency as real indicators of lasting power. She distinguished between relational power (the power to compel A to get B to do something B does not want to do) and structural power (the power to shape and determine the structure of the global political economy). Political scientists Henry Farrell and Abraham L. Newman argue that state power is in part derived from control over important nodes in global networks of informational and financial exchange, which means that states can "weaponize interdependence" by fighting over control of these nodes.

=== Power as capability ===
American author Charles W. Freeman, Jr. described power as the following:

Power is the capacity to direct the decisions and actions of others. Power derives from strength and will. Strength comes from the transformation of resources into capabilities. Will infuses objectives with resolve. Strategy marshals capabilities and brings them to bear with precision. Statecraft seeks through strategy to magnify the mass, relevance, impact, and irresistibility of power. It guides the ways the state deploys and applies its power abroad. These ways embrace the arts of war, espionage, and diplomacy. The practitioners of these three arts are the paladins of statecraft.

Power is also used to describe the resources and capabilities of a state. This definition is quantitative and is most often used by geopoliticians and the military. Capabilities are thought of in tangible terms—they are measurable, weighable, quantifiable assets. A good example for this kind of measurement is the Composite Indicator on Aggregate Power, which involves 54 indicators and covers the capabilities of 44 states in Asia-Pacific from 1992 to 2012.

Chinese strategists have such a concept of national power that can be measured quantitatively using an index known as Comprehensive National Power.

Michael Beckley argues that gross domestic product and military spending are imprecise indicators of power. He argues that better measurements of power should take into account "net" indicators of powers: "[Gross] indicators systematically exaggerate the wealth and military capabilities of poor, populous countries, because they tally countries' resources without deducting the costs countries pay to police, protect, and serve their people. A country with a big population might produce vast output and field a large army, but it also may bear massive welfare and security burdens that drain its wealth and bog down its military, leaving it with few resources for power projection abroad."

== Power as status ==
=== Definitions ===
Much effort in academic and popular writing is devoted to deciding which countries have the status of "power", and how this can be measured. If a country has "power" (as influence) in military, diplomatic, cultural, and economic spheres, it might be called a "power" (as status). There are several and inclusion of a state in one category or another is fraught with difficulty and controversy. In his famous 1987 work, The Rise and Fall of the Great Powers, British historian Paul Kennedy charts the relative status of the various powers from AD 1500 to 2000. He does not begin the book with a theoretical definition of "great power"; however, he lists them, separately, for many different eras. Moreover, he uses different working definitions of "great power" for different eras. For example:

France was not strong enough to oppose Germany in a one-to-one struggle ... If the mark of a Great Power is a country which is willing to take on any other, then France (like Austria-Hungary) had slipped to a lower position. But that definition seemed too abstract in 1914 to a nation geared up for war, militarily stronger than ever, wealthy, and, above all, endowed with powerful allies.

Neorealist scholars frequently define power as entailing military capabilities and economic strength. Classical realists recognized that the ability to influence depended on psychological relationships that touched on ethical principles, legitimacy and justice, as well as emotions, leaders' skill and power over opinion.

In the 2020s, status and power on the international stage were increasingly associated with climate leadership among countries.

=== Categories of power ===
In the modern geopolitical landscape, a number of terms are used to describe various types of powers, which include the following:

- Hegemony: A state that has the power to shape the international system and "control the external behavior of all other states." Hegemony can be regional or global. Unlike unipolarity, which is a power preponderance within an anarchic international system of nominally equal states, hegemony assumes a hierarchy where the most powerful can control other states.
- Unipole: A state that enjoys a preponderance of power and faces no competitor states. According to William Wohlforth, "a unipolar system is one in which a counterbalance is impossible. When a counterbalance becomes possible, the system is not unipolar." A unipolar state is not the same as an empire or a hegemon that can control the behavior of all other states.
- Superpower: In 1944, William T. R. Fox defined superpower as "great power plus great mobility of power" and identified three states: the British Empire, the Soviet Union, and the United States. With the decolonisation of the British Empire following World War II, and then the dissolution of the Soviet Union in 1991, the United States has remained to be the sole superpower. China is now considered an emerging global superpower by many scholars.
- Great power: In historical mentions, the term great power refers to the states that have strong political, cultural and economical influence over nations around them and across the world.
- Middle power: A subjective description of influential second-tier states that could not quite be described as great or small powers. A middle power has sufficient strength and authority to stand on its own without the need of help from others (particularly in the realm of security) and takes diplomatic leads in regional and global affairs. Clearly not all middle powers are of equal status; some are members of forums such as the G20 and play important roles in the United Nations and other international organisations such as the WTO.
- Small power: The International System is for the most part made up by small powers. They are instruments of the other powers and may at times be dominated; but they cannot be ignored.

==== Other categories ====
- Emerging power: A transitional category in which a state or union of states is viewed as on a trajectory of increasing global influence.
- Regional power: This term is used to describe a nation that exercises influence and power within a region. Being a regional power is not mutually exclusive with any of the other categories of power. The majority of them exert a strategic degree of influence as minor or secondary regional powers, although primary regional powers (like Australia or Brazil) can also have an important role in international affairs outside of its region too.
- Cultural superpower: Refers to a country whose culture, arts, sports, or entertainment have worldwide appeal, significant international popularity or large influence on much of the world. Among the countries described as such are Brazil, China, France, Greece, India, Italy, Jamaica, Japan, South Korea, Spain, the United Kingdom, and the United States, although the criteria upon which this is determined are sometimes debated. Unlike traditional forms of national power, the term cultural superpower is in reference to a nation's soft power capabilities.
- Energy superpower: Describes a country that supplies large amounts of energy resources (crude oil, natural gas, coal, uranium, etc.) to a significant number of other states, and therefore has the potential to influence world markets to gain a political or economic advantage. Saudi Arabia and Russia are generally acknowledged as the world's current energy superpowers, given their abilities to globally influence or even directly control prices to certain countries. Australia and Canada are potential energy superpowers due to their large natural resources.

== Hard, soft and smart power ==
Some political scientists distinguish between two types of power: Hard and Soft. The former is coercive (example: military invasion) while the latter is attractive (example: broadcast media or cultural invasion).

Joseph Nye was the leading proponent and theorist of soft power.

== See also ==
- Global policeman
- International relations (1814–1919)
- Peace through strength
- Power Politics (Wight book)
- Power transition theory
- Right of conquest
- Responsibility to protect
