= Power transition theory =

Theory regarding international relations and war

Power transition theory is a theory about the nature of war, in relation to the power in international relations. The theory was first published in 1958 by its creator, A. F. K. Organski, in his textbook, World Politics (1958).

== Theory ==
Organski first described power transition theory. According to Organski in his textbook, World Politics (1958):

An even distribution of political, economic, and military capabilities between contending groups of states is likely to increase the probability of war; peace is preserved best when there is an imbalance of national capabilities between disadvantaged and advantaged nations; the aggressor will come from a small group of dissatisfied strong countries; and it is the weaker, rather than the stronger power that is most likely to be the aggressor.

Steve Chan summarizes the theory as "the danger of systemic war is greatest when a rising challenger catches up with or even overtakes a declining hegemon." The underlying logic is that a rising power that is satisfied with the order of the international system has little incentive to challenge the status quo, while a dissatisfied rising power may wish to challenge the status quo.

Power transition theory interprets the international system as a hierarchical pyramid with the dominant power at the apex, then lesser great powers, then other medium and small states and dependences.

While Organski's hierarchy initially referred only to the entire international system, Douglas Lemke later expanded the hierarchy model to include regional hierarchies, arguing that each region contains its own dominant, great, and small powers. Thus regional hierarchies exist embedded into the larger international hierarchy.

Power transition theory, a precursor of the long-cycle theory of hegemony, seeks to explain trends between warring states in the past 500 years. It detects a general trend: a nation achieves hegemonic power and then is challenged by a great power. This leads to a war which, in the past, has resulted a transition between two powers. Eugene R. Wittkopf explores past wars and their relation to power transition theory in his 1997 book World Politics: Trend and Transformation. He explains the interactions using George Modelski's Seapower Concentration Index.

== Historical application ==
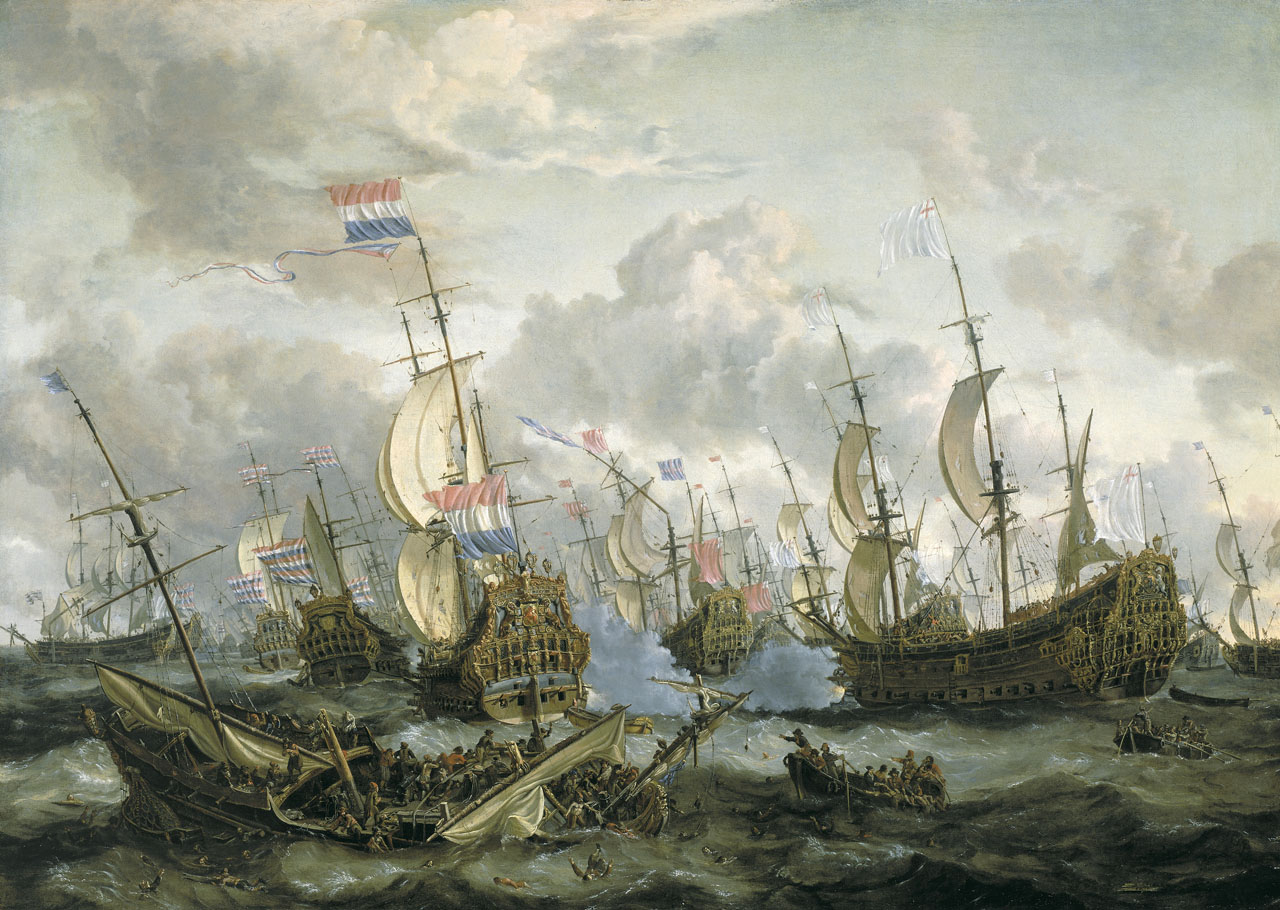
The Royal Prince and other vessels at the Four Days Fight, 11–14 June 1666 by Abraham Storck depicts a battle of the Second Anglo-Dutch War. This period marked the beginning of a significant threat to Dutch hegemony in Europe

Power transition theory often cites the Peloponnesian War between Athens and Sparta and Thucydides' assertions that war was inevitable because of "the growth of the power of Athens, and the alarm which this inspired in Sparta" and "the strong do what they can and the weak suffer what they must."

Power transition theory uses European historical cases as its theoretical basis and for deriving its causal propositions.

In 1518, Portugal assumed a hegemonic position in world politics. However, as the Netherlands rose in power during the Dutch Golden Age of 1588 to 1672, a series of struggles led to the destruction of Portugal's power and a transition to Dutch hegemony. Dutch hegemony came into question from 1688 with the wars of Louis XIV of France, which resulted in what political scientists refer to as the "Britain I Cycle"; the Napoleonic Wars interrupted this cycle and questioned the hegemony Britain possessed. However, ultimately, Allies' victory in 1815 resulted in the maintenance of British power and the "Britain II Cycle". This cycle ended with the World Wars of the first half of the 20th century. Wittkopf portrays the period of 1914–1945 as one of particular turbulence in which no power maintained hegemony, even after the 1919 Treaty of Versailles. After the Second World War (1939–1945) the United States invested in a drastic increase in seapower concentration – and the U.S. and the Soviet Union became the world's first superpowers.

A review by academics Xinru Ma and David C. Kang of articles first-tier journals found that the case most analyzed under power transition theory was the Anglo-German rivalry of the 20th century. No articles within their review discussed an East Asian case from earlier than the late 19th century.

In general, hegemonic periods last approximately 60 to 90 years and conflicts which result in a period stabilization of power-distribution last approximately 20 years. This can be explained through war-weariness and the tendency (although this was broken in the first half of the 20th century) for nations not to engage themselves in another conflict after being involved in a power transition.

Power transitions play an important role in applications of the bargaining model of war where wars are more likely to break out and be severe in situations of uncertainty and of commitment problems. During power transitions, it is harder for actors to credibly commit to abide by any agreement, thus creating major commitment problems.

International relations scholars Randall Schweller and Xiaoyu Pu find that the challenger not only seeks to increase its material power but also to promote its own ideological and normative frameworks as alternatives to those propagated by the hegemon.

Michael Beckley, writing in 2023, states that conflict between great powers can happen even when a power transition does not appear to be likely. He argues that rising powers have historically

"lashed out when they realized that they would not catch their rivals or achieve their grand ambitions—unless they took drastic action. These peaking power dynamics help explain some of the most consequential geopolitical events of the past 150 years, including the surge of U.S. imperialism in the late nineteenth century, the outbreak of World War II, and Russia's 2014 annexation of Crimea and intervention in eastern Ukraine."

Publishing in 2024, Academics Xinru Ma and David C. Kang write that nearly all of the cases analyzed under power transition theory are post-1820s European cases. They write that this approach creates a Eurocentric "blind spot" and overemphasizes the importance and generalizability of the European and Western historical experience. They contend that this "has led to an overexpectation that power transitions are a principal cause for war and that the theory is universally applicable across time and space."

Academics Richard Ned Lebow and Benjamin Valentino write, "Power transition theorists have been surprisingly reluctant to engage historical cases in an effort to show that wars between great powers have actually resulted from the motives described by their theories."

According to Randall Schweller, there are four hegemonic wars (defined as wars "that end in a new phase of substantial capability re-concentration and global military-political and economic leadership"): the Italian Wars (1496–1559), the Thirty Years’ War (1618–1648), the French Revolutionary and Napoleonic Wars (1792–1815), and World War II (1939–1945).

== See also ==
- Thucydides trap
- Kindleberger Trap
