= Powermetrics model =

National power model

The powermetrics model is a model used to evaluate national power developed by Mirosław Sułek. It is described by him as a science that pretends to provide a factual measurement of power, in order to eventually forecast possible movements in the future. Therefore, it is useful in the analysis and statistical predictions concerning power. It can be understood as a subdiscipline of Geopolitical Science dealing with the measure of National Power.

Powermetrics as a methodology is based on different fields of studies, such as international relations, geopolitics and cybernetics. Among those who specialize in this field are Mirosław Sułek, Robert Białoskórski, and Łukasz Kiczma.

== History ==
Powermetrics is described as a quantitative branch of powernomics, which is a tool born in 1991 designed to understand power relations from an economic point of view at the end of the Cold War. This tool was developed to give the United States an explanation of the possible evolution of national power. While powernomics is the understanding political units of power, using economy as a starting point, powermetrics tries to provide an exact model to measure power. Even though powermetric already existed before 1991, it intensified after the end of the Cold War. The use of this tool has been found to influence countries’ policies as well as the economic, security and inner actions.

== W. Fucks's Model ==
Wilhelm Fucks designed a model to understand the power of a nation according to three variables: population, steel, and energy. With this in mind he attempted to predict the position of power countries (namely the United States and the Soviet Union) would be positioned with in during future decades. Fucks's work centered on understanding the possible changes within the balance of power.

== Sułek’s Model of Powermetrics ==
This tool develops an understanding of military, economic and geopolitical national power. Here, economic power is understood as the result of GDP, demographic, and spatial factors. Meanwhile, military power takes into account the military expenditures that are included in the GDP of a nation as well as demographic factors. Finally, the geopolitical power is calculated, according to the 2019 National Power Ranking of 2019 as the “arithmetic mean of economic power and double military power”. Population is among the most important variables for the method. Sułek is considered as a pioneer among Polish scholars on the field of powermetrics.

== The Powermentrics Research Network ==
Founded in 2017, the Powermetrics Research Network is a group concerned in the accumulation of statistics of national power, as well as the spread of knowledge of powermetrics as a forecasting tool . It has published three National Power Rankings, taking data existing from 1992 to present years.
