= List of countries by GDP (blended) =

GDP (blended) is an official, but not specifically organized dataset used by the IMF in calculating 50% of each member state's quota. Quotas reflect the relative size of an economy and is denominated by special drawing rights (SDRs). The other 50% of the Quota is made up by: "openness (30 percent), economic variability (15 percent) and international reserves (5 percent)."

Blended GDP is calculated by taking a weighted average of 60% Market Exchange Rate GDP and 40% Purchasing Power Parity GDP.

== Table ==
GDP forecast or estimate (million $) by country, IMF 2025
Country	No.	Nominal	PPP	Blended	% Sum
United States	1	30,615,743	30,615,743	30,615,743	19.88%
China	2	19,398,577	41,015,824	28,045,476	18.21%
India	3	4,125,213	17,714,186	9,560,802	6.21%
Germany	4	5,013,574	6,153,741	5,469,641	3.55%
Japan	5	4,279,828	6,758,231	5,271,189	3.42%
Russia	6	2,540,656	7,143,093	4,381,631	2.85%
United Kingdom	7	3,958,780	4,454,716	4,157,154	2.70%
France	8	3,361,557	4,533,633	3,830,387	2.49%
Brazil	9	2,256,910	4,973,385	3,343,500	2.17%
Italy	10	2,543,677	3,720,271	3,014,315	1.96%
Indonesia	11	1,443,256	5,015,762	2,872,258	1.86%
Mexico	12	1,862,740	3,436,930	2,492,416	1.62%
South Korea	13	1,858,572	3,363,419	2,460,511	1.60%
Canada	14	2,283,599	2,722,795	2,459,277	1.60%
Turkey	15	1,565,471	3,766,766	2,445,989	1.59%
Spain	16	1,891,371	2,828,510	2,266,227	1.47%
Australia	17	1,829,508	1,981,672	1,890,374	1.23%
Saudi Arabia	18	1,268,535	2,688,520	1,836,529	1.19%
Poland	19	1,039,619	2,019,780	1,431,683	0.93%
Netherlands	20	1,320,635	1,516,663	1,399,046	0.91%
Taiwan	21	884,387	1,990,268	1,326,739	0.86%
Egypt	22	349,264	2,381,507	1,162,161	0.75%
Thailand	23	558,573	1,853,771	1,076,652	0.70%
Nigeria	24	285,003	2,254,167	1,072,669	0.70%
Vietnam	25	484,726	1,807,050	1,013,656	0.66%
Argentina	26	683,371	1,490,164	1,006,088	0.65%
Bangladesh	27	475,011	1,782,105	997,849	0.65%
Iran	28	356,513	1,878,892	965,465	0.63%
Switzerland	29	1,002,666	881,787	954,314	0.62%
Pakistan	30	410,495	1,671,381	914,849	0.59%
Philippines	31	494,158	1,477,711	887,579	0.58%
Malaysia	32	470,572	1,478,139	873,599	0.57%
Belgium	33	716,980	900,497	790,387	0.51%
Ireland	34	708,771	811,665	749,929	0.49%
Colombia	35	438,121	1,189,465	738,659	0.48%
Singapore	36	574,185	953,943	726,088	0.47%
United Arab Emirates	37	569,097	935,449	715,638	0.46%
Sweden	38	662,318	780,115	709,437	0.46%
South Africa	39	426,383	1,026,500	666,430	0.43%
Romania	40	422,508	919,881	621,457	0.40%
Austria	41	566,456	687,271	614,782	0.40%
Israel	42	610,752	567,573	593,480	0.39%
Norway	43	517,102	600,452	550,442	0.36%
Kazakhstan	44	300,052	912,589	545,067	0.35%
Algeria	45	288,013	874,599	522,647	0.34%
Hong Kong	46	428,233	594,533	494,753	0.32%
Chile	47	347,174	713,032	493,517	0.32%
Czech Republic	48	383,384	652,610	491,074	0.32%
Denmark	49	459,612	508,718	479,254	0.31%
Peru	50	318,480	653,089	452,324	0.29%
Iraq	51	265,455	700,586	439,507	0.29%
Portugal	52	337,936	535,210	416,846	0.27%
Ukraine	53	209,713	686,940	400,604	0.26%
Greece	54	282,019	466,945	355,989	0.23%
Finland	55	314,724	373,246	338,133	0.22%
Hungary	56	247,759	460,378	332,807	0.22%
Qatar	57	222,119	380,191	285,348	0.19%
Morocco	58	179,612	431,318	280,294	0.18%
New Zealand	59	262,909	296,970	276,533	0.18%
Uzbekistan	60	137,480	473,486	271,882	0.18%
Ethiopia	61	109,492	486,830	260,427	0.17%
Kenya	62	136,014	403,146	242,867	0.16%
Angola	63	115,167	401,480	229,692	0.15%
Dominican Republic	64	129,748	332,415	210,815	0.14%
Kuwait	65	157,469	270,239	202,577	0.13%
Ecuador	66	130,529	304,232	200,010	0.13%
Sri Lanka	67	98,964	343,101	196,619	0.13%
Slovakia	68	154,587	257,947	195,931	0.13%
Guatemala	69	120,850	281,690	185,186	0.12%
Ghana	70	111,963	294,901	185,138	0.12%
Bulgaria	71	127,924	266,031	183,167	0.12%
Belarus	72	85,739	309,585	175,277	0.11%
Tanzania	73	87,444	293,631	169,919	0.11%
Ivory Coast	74	99,207	266,886	166,279	0.11%
Oman	75	105,190	232,242	156,011	0.10%
Azerbaijan	76	76,390	270,503	154,035	0.10%
Myanmar	77	60,561	273,200	145,617	0.09%
Serbia	78	100,048	213,791	145,545	0.09%
Venezuela	79	82,767	234,340	143,396	0.09%
Croatia	80	103,901	198,312	141,665	0.09%
Puerto Rico	81	126,546	163,491	141,324	0.09%
Panama	82	90,408	199,293	133,962	0.09%
Democratic Republic of the Congo	83	82,262	210,388	133,512	0.09%
Costa Rica	84	102,637	169,154	129,244	0.08%
Lithuania	85	95,274	165,234	123,258	0.08%
Uganda	86	64,993	187,489	113,991	0.07%
Tunisia	87	59,069	186,259	109,945	0.07%
Cameroon	88	60,577	173,034	105,560	0.07%
Turkmenistan	89	72,119	152,608	104,315	0.07%
Uruguay	90	84,986	129,642	102,848	0.07%
Luxembourg	91	100,642	104,465	102,171	0.07%
Nepal	92	45,513	182,016	100,114	0.07%
Slovenia	93	79,221	122,985	96,727	0.06%
Bolivia	94	57,086	142,416	91,218	0.06%
Syria	95	60,043	136,379	90,577	0.06%
Cambodia	96	48,802	151,100	89,721	0.06%
Zimbabwe	97	53,310	136,151	86,446	0.06%
Jordan	98	56,157	131,708	86,377	0.06%
Paraguay	99	47,398	137,459	83,422	0.05%
Libya	100	47,941	125,195	78,843	0.05%
Bahrain	101	47,391	112,221	73,323	0.05%
Sudan	102	35,897	121,942	70,315	0.05%
Macau	103	52,379	92,738	68,523	0.04%
Georgia	104	37,403	114,839	68,377	0.04%
Senegal	105	36,839	102,666	63,170	0.04%
Latvia	106	47,880	82,395	61,686	0.04%
Honduras	107	39,445	86,292	58,184	0.04%
El Salvador	108	36,587	88,394	57,310	0.04%
Zambia	109	29,369	97,756	56,724	0.04%
Estonia	110	46,763	67,433	55,031	0.04%
Bosnia and Herzegovina	111	33,237	78,652	51,403	0.03%
Afghanistan	112	18,080	95,253	48,949	0.03%
Cyprus	113	39,943	61,501	48,566	0.03%
Guinea	114	27,515	75,081	46,541	0.03%
Armenia	115	27,859	74,407	46,478	0.03%
Burkina Faso	116	26,866	72,743	45,217	0.03%
Guyana	117	25,064	75,238	45,134	0.03%
Mali	118	25,591	72,963	44,540	0.03%
Mongolia	119	25,105	73,028	44,274	0.03%
Albania	120	29,939	62,871	43,112	0.03%
Benin	121	24,402	70,423	42,810	0.03%
Lebanon	122	28,280	63,260	42,272	0.03%
Laos	123	16,934	79,531	41,973	0.03%
Mozambique	124	24,726	62,087	39,670	0.03%
Papua New Guinea	125	32,714	48,164	38,894	0.03%
Yemen	126	17,352	69,918	38,378	0.02%
Niger	127	22,969	61,025	38,191	0.02%
Nicaragua	128	20,689	63,636	37,868	0.02%
Kyrgyzstan	129	20,160	64,105	37,738	0.02%
Madagascar	130	19,377	64,138	37,281	0.02%
Chad	131	21,592	59,822	36,884	0.02%
Trinidad and Tobago	132	26,002	51,513	36,206	0.02%
Gabon	133	21,455	57,054	35,695	0.02%
Iceland	134	38,386	31,470	35,620	0.02%
Tajikistan	135	17,032	63,083	35,452	0.02%
Malta	136	27,745	44,317	34,374	0.02%
Haiti	137	30,908	37,372	33,494	0.02%
North Macedonia	138	18,783	53,409	32,633	0.02%
Botswana	139	19,186	52,650	32,572	0.02%
Rwanda	140	14,771	58,074	32,092	0.02%
Moldova	141	19,620	46,651	30,432	0.02%
Jamaica	142	23,137	38,331	29,215	0.02%
Brunei	143	15,565	43,429	26,711	0.02%
Republic of the Congo	144	15,695	42,259	26,321	0.02%
Mauritius	145	15,730	41,493	26,035	0.02%
Malawi	146	14,975	42,285	25,899	0.02%
Namibia	147	14,686	37,632	23,864	0.02%
Mauritania	148	11,953	40,620	23,420	0.02%
Equatorial Guinea	149	13,467	33,541	21,497	0.01%
Somalia	150	12,944	32,190	20,642	0.01%
Kosovo	151	12,672	32,169	20,471	0.01%
Togo	152	10,951	32,991	19,767	0.01%
Sierra Leone	153	8,639	32,629	18,235	0.01%
Palestine	154	13,711	23,153	17,488	0.01%
Bahamas	155	16,393	17,332	16,769	0.01%
Montenegro	156	9,353	21,476	14,202	0.01%
Maldives	157	7,676	14,816	10,532	0.01%
Burundi	158	7,025	14,314	9,941	0.01%
Fiji	159	6,336	15,192	9,878	0.01%
Eswatini	160	5,201	15,699	9,400	0.01%
South Sudan	161	4,979	15,160	9,051	0.01%
Liechtenstein	162	9,424	8,179	8,926	0.01%
Suriname	163	4,496	14,654	8,559	0.01%
Bhutan	164	3,408	14,096	7,683	0.00%
Liberia	165	5,182	11,238	7,604	0.00%
Barbados	166	7,559	6,760	7,239	0.00%
Djibouti	167	4,613	9,935	6,742	0.00%
The Gambia	168	2,497	10,324	5,628	0.00%
Andorra	169	4,408	6,450	5,225	0.00%
Central African Republic	170	3,300	7,549	5,000	0.00%
Aruba	171	4,319	5,393	4,749	0.00%
Belize	172	3,297	6,229	4,470	0.00%
Lesotho	173	2,390	7,375	4,384	0.00%
Cape Verde	174	2,915	6,340	4,285	0.00%
Guinea-Bissau	175	2,474	6,622	4,133	0.00%
East Timor	176	2,125	7,074	4,105	0.00%
Eritrea	177	1,982	6,369	3,737	0.00%
Saint Lucia	178	2,659	5,312	3,720	0.00%
Seychelles	179	2,230	4,278	3,049	0.00%
Antigua and Barbuda	180	2,340	3,291	2,720	0.00%
San Marino	181	2,241	2,846	2,483	0.00%
Comoros	182	1,613	3,652	2,429	0.00%
Solomon Islands	183	1,904	2,164	2,008	0.00%
Grenada	184	1,458	2,490	1,871	0.00%
Saint Vincent and the Grenadines	185	1,238	2,362	1,688	0.00%
Samoa	186	1,248	1,750	1,449	0.00%
Saint Kitts and Nevis	187	1,141	1,756	1,387	0.00%
São Tomé and Príncipe	188	976	1,552	1,206	0.00%
Vanuatu	189	1,119	1,070	1,099	0.00%
Dominica	190	748	1,458	1,032	0.00%
Tonga	191	587	802	673	0.00%
Federated States of Micronesia	192	495	450	477	0.00%
Kiribati	193	321	479	384	0.00%
Palau	194	341	333	338	0.00%
Marshall Islands	195	302	281	294	0.00%
Nauru	196	172	148	162	0.00%
Tuvalu	197	58	61	59	0.00%

== Importance ==
The United States Government has argued to remove China as a developing nation and common evidence used in that argument is that China is the world's largest economy under the metric PPP. China on the other hand has argued that PPP is a "flawed" metric, useful in Economics, but not a good representation of China's comprehensive national power.

Blended GDP serves as a compromise between nominal and PPP GDP and is used to affect real world economics. The higher a country's blended GDP is, the larger a country's voting power in the IMF is and as a result, international responsibility.

Blended GDP is also referenced by multiple institutions such as the World Bank, who uses Blended GDP as an example of PPP use in policy making.

== Proposals ==
Blended GDP has gone through several attempts at reform:

- Think 20 has suggested to increase the share of PPP to 50% to better represent developing nations.
- PIIE has looked at the theoretical from 50% of the Quota formula to 90%.
- The Boston University GDP Center references scholarly debates such as once that suggest removing the "openness" metric in favor of Blended GDP.
- A paper from the European Central Bank has analyzed alternative quota formulas and explicitly discusses scenarios using a “blended GDP variable” with specific weights on PPP and market-rate GDP.
