= National power =

Sum of all resources available to a nation in the pursuit of national objectives

National power is defined as the sum of all resources available to a nation in the pursuit of national objectives. Assessing the national power of political entities was already a matter of relevance during the classical antiquity, the Middle Ages and the Renaissance and today. Classics Shang Yang, Guan Zhong and Chanakya, widely discussed the power of state. Many other classics, such as Mozi, Appian, Pliny the Elder, also concerned the subject. Herodotes described whence derives the power of Babylon. The considerations of Hannibal on the matter is found in Titus Livy.

== Elements of national power ==
National power stems from various elements, also called instruments or attributes; these may be put into two groups based on their applicability and origin - "natural" and "social".

- Natural:
  - Geography
  - Resources
  - Population
- Social:
  - Economic
  - Political
  - Military
  - Psychological (National morale)
  - Informational

=== Geography ===
Important facets of geography such as location, climate, topography, size and resources play major roles in the ability of a nation to gain national power. The relation between foreign policy and geographic space gave rise to the discipline of geopolitics including the concepts of lebensraum and "grossraum". The latter is a region with natural resources sufficient for autarky.

Space has a strategic value. Russia's size permitted it to trade space for time during the Great Patriotic War. To a less extent, the same is true for China in the war against Japan.

Location has an important bearing on foreign policy of a nation. The presence of a water obstacle provided protection to states such as Ancient Rome, Great Britain, Japan, and the United States. The geographic protection allowed Rome, Japan, and the United States to follow isolationist policies, and Britain the policy of non-involvement in Europe. The presence of large accessible seaboards also permitted these nations to build strong navies and expand their territories peacefully or by conquest. In contrast, Poland, with no obstacle for its powerful neighbours, lost its independence from 1795 to 1918 and again from 1939 to 1989.

Since Antiquity, the importance of climate was stressed, with the temperate zone being regarded as favoring great powers. Aristotle in Politics argued that the Greeks, placed in the temperate zone, qualify for world domination. Pliny the Elder observed that in the temperate zone, there are governments, which the outer races never have possessed.

The temperate zone as power factor remained widely stressed in the modern research. In fact, all modern great powers have been located in the temperate zone. A.F.K. Organski criticized this hypothesis as "an accident of history." The Industrial Revolution happened, by accident, in the temperate zone and so far, also by accident, there are no major industrial nations outside this zone. But the world will become industrial, "now that the industrial revolution is galloping triumphant throughout the world."

Organski abandoned the theory of temperate zone as untenable. By contrast, Max Ostrovsky developed it further. He doubted historical accidents. Writing half-a-century after Organski, he noted that the Industrial Revolution is still not "galloping triumphant throughout the world" but remains bound to the temperate zone. Moreover, vast temperate zones of Turkestan and Mongolia do not generate great powers. It appeared that besides the mild temperature, a right amount of rain was necessary, as only humid temperate areas have been sources of great power.

This observation challenged a dominant element of the temperate theory. Most of its proponents believed that temperate climate develops industrious mind. None inquired what rain has to do with mind. Instead of climate developing mind, Ostrovsky replaced mind with cereal agriculture. Rains, he argued, favor cereals rather than human mind, while the productive cereal agriculture favors industry. The more productive is the cereal agriculture, the more manpower is available to industry and other non-agricultural sectors. For this reason, and not "by accident," the Industrial Revolution followed the modern Agricultural Revolution in time and space and is not "galloping triumphant" anywhere in the world beyond the humid temperate areas. In size, Russia is larger than the United States, but its temperate zone with optimum rainfall is smaller, as most of the territory is in latitudes well north. All things being equal, Ostrovsky concluded, who rules the largest rainy temperate zone, rules the world. But all things are seldom equal. For this reason, he avoided geographic determinism and formulized an indicator of national power which combines climatic conditions and organizational level (see "National power indicator" below).

== Measurements ==
Depending on the interaction of the individual elements of national power, attempts can be made to classify states and assign them a status in the international order of states. Globally important states with dominant positions in all or almost all elements of national power are called superpowers. This term was applied to the Soviet Union and the United States during the Cold War. In the 21st century, it is also increasingly applied to the People's Republic of China. Other status classification terms for states include, in descending hierarchy, world powers, great powers, regional powers, middle powers, and small powers. For states or alliances with almost absolute power, the term hyperpower is used.

Despite the difficulty of the task and the multidimensional nature of power, several attempts have been made to express the power of states in objective rankings and indexes based on statistical indicators.

=== Composite Index of National Capability ===
Comparison of CINC values of USA, UK, China and Russia since the 19th century.

The Composite Index of National Capability (CINC) was conceived by J. David Singer in 1963. It includes the six factors of total population, urban population, iron and steel production, primary energy consumption, military expenditure and number of soldiers and calculates an index from them. His methodology is considered outdated, however, as he only takes into account "hard" power factors and indicators such as steel production no longer have the same significance as in the early 20th century.

Top 10 powers (2007)
Rank	Country
1	China
2	United States
3	India
4	Japan
5	Russia
6	South Korea
7	Germany
8	Brazil
9	United Kingdom
10	France

Criticism: CINC suggests, “nonsensically,” that Israel is, and has always been, one of the weakest countries in the Middle East; Russia dominated Europe throughout the 1990s, with more power than Germany, France, and the United Kingdom combined; and China has dominated the world since 1996 and by 2018 twice exceeded the power of the United States.

=== National Power Ranking of Countries ===
The National Power Ranking of Countries was published in a paper by the University of Warsaw and the University of Wroclaw. It divides countries into the categories of economic, military and geopolitical power, which is derived from statistical indicators. The report also analyzes the evolution of the distribution of power in the world since 1992 and makes a forecast for 2050, noting an increasing shift of power from the Western world to the Asia-Pacific region.

Top 10 powers (2018)
Economic power		Military power		Geopolitical power	
Rank	Country	Rank	Country	Rank	Country
1	China	1	United States	1	United States
2	United States	2	China	2	China
3	India	3	India	3	India
4	Japan	4	Russia	4	Russia
5	Brazil	5	Saudi Arabia	5	Saudi Arabia
6	Germany	6	France	6	Japan
7	Russia	7	Brazil	7	Brazil
8	France	8	Japan	8	France
9	United Kingdom	9	United Kingdom	9	Germany
10	Canada	10	South Korea	10	United Kingdom

=== State Power Index ===
The State Power Index was developed by Piotr Arak and Grzegorz Lewicki and takes into account the factors of economy, military, land area, population, cultural influence, natural resources and diplomacy, which is combined into an overall index.

Top 10 powers (2017)
Rank	Country
1	United States
2	China
3	Russia
4	India
5	Germany
6	United Kingdom
7	France
8	Japan
9	Brazil
10	Canada

=== World Power Index ===
The World Power Index (WPI) is a numerical expression that refers the accumulation of national capacities that a State possesses for the exercise of its power in the international system.

The WPI is the result of adding 18 indicators, which are organized through three composite indices:

- Material Capacities Index (MCI),
- Semimaterial Capacities Index (SCI),
- Immaterial Capabilities Index (ICI).

The WPI is presented as an analysis technique that, being quantitative, seeks to help overcome the hermeneutics that underlies the subjective interpretation of national power. In this way, the WPI contributes to the accurate comparison of the national capacities of States and the study of their position in the international structure.

Top 10 powers (2022)
Rank	Country
1	United States
2	China
3	Germany
4	Japan
5	France
6	United Kingdom
7	Canada
8	Italy
9	Australia
10	South Korea

=== National power indicator ===
This indicator was developed by Max Ostrovsky. He reduced numerous indexes to one basic indicator—cereal tonnage produced by one percent of national manpower. He argues that this indicator is defined by environmental conditions and organizational level and in its turn defines the percentage of manpower available to non-agricultural activities.

Top 10 powers (2007)
Rank	Country	Thousand tons
1	United States	134,441
2	France	42,909
3	Argentina	33,435
4	Germany	17,741
5	Canada	15,365
6	United Kingdom	14,697
7	China	7,610
8	Australia	6,223
9	Russia	4,677
10	India	3,820

== See also ==
- Geopolitics
- Power projection
- Power in international relations
- Composite Index of National Capability
- Comprehensive National Power
- Most powerful countries
