= Center for Global Initiatives =

Research center at the University of North Carolina

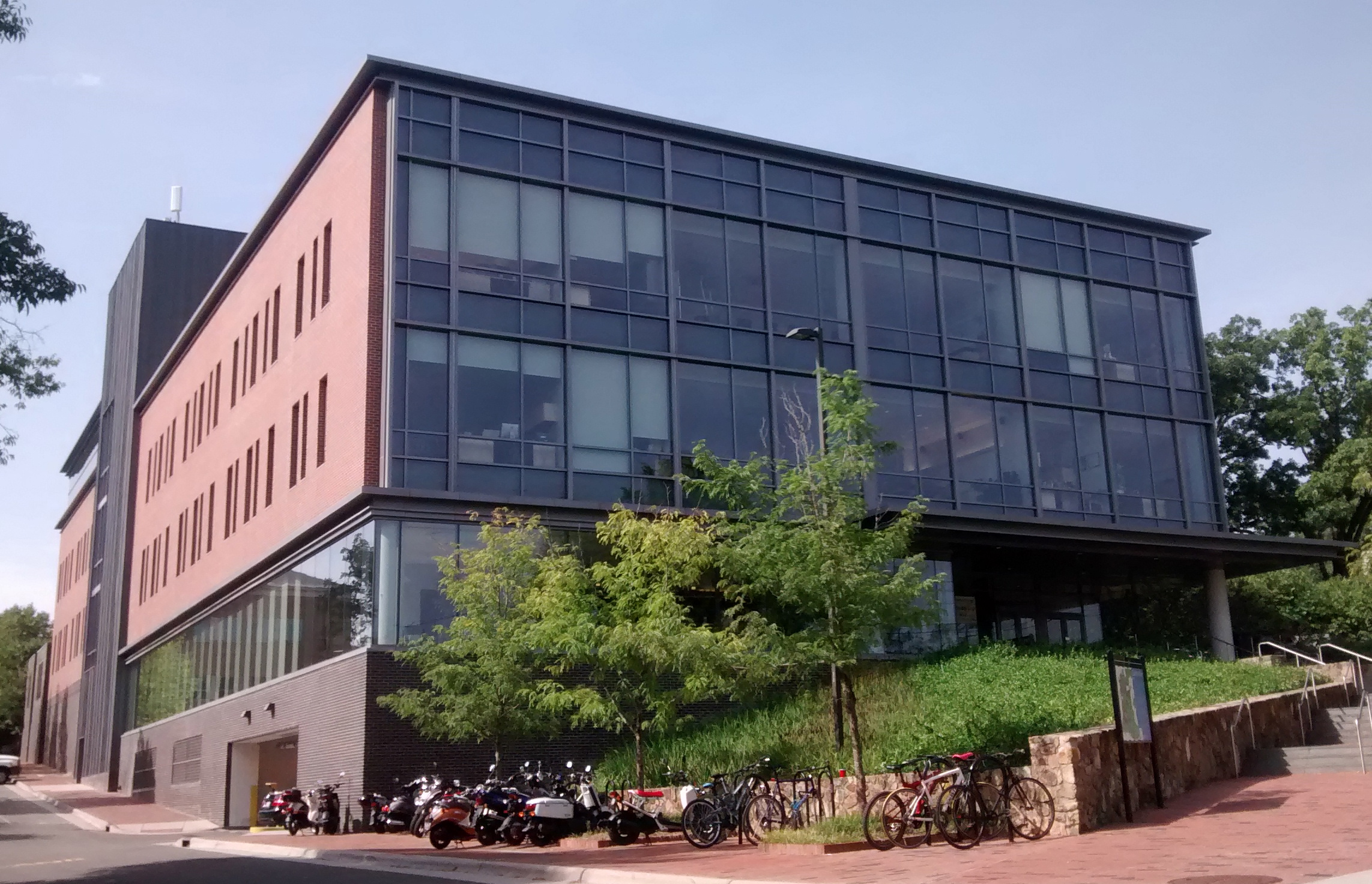
- FedEx Global Education Center
- Established: 1993
- Location: Pittsboro Street; University of North Carolina; Chapel Hill, North Carolina
- Website: cgi.unc.edu

The Center for Global Initiatives (CGI) is a research center at the University of North Carolina at Chapel Hill. It is part of the National Resource Center program of the U.S. Department of Education. CGI offers grants and scholarships to students and faculty to travel abroad, complete internships, and develop internationally focused courses. CGI also serves as the home to the Fulbright Program at UNC-Chapel Hill.

== History ==
CGI was founded as the "University Center for International Studies" in 1993. The name was changed in 2007 to Center for Global Initiatives.

== Programs ==
CGI is the institutional home to the following programs:

- Carolina for Kibera (CFK) - A participatory development NGO operating in the Kibera slum of Nairobi, Kenya.
- Carolina Navigators - A K-12 International Outreach program that serves high schools in North Carolina
- Duke-UNC Rotary Center for International Studies - A joint program with Duke University, the center offers 2-year fellowships for international students to study at either school.
- Scholars Latino Initiative (SLI) - A mentoring program that pairs UNC-Chapel Hill students with Latino high school students with the goal of increasing college access.

== Fellowships and scholarships ==
CGI offers a variety of funding opportunities to undergraduate and graduate students, faculty, and staff.

=== FLAS ===
The Foreign Language and Area Studies (FLAS) fellowships are federally funded academic scholarships designed to provide support and funding to graduate students studying the languages and cultures of specific foreign countries, in particular those in the strategic interest of the United States.

=== Fulbright Program ===
This program provides a 9–12-month fully funded international research/study opportunity or an English Teaching Assistantship for recent BA/BS graduates, Master's and doctoral candidates, young professionals, or artists and musicians.

=== Carolina Global Initiative ===
These awards are intended to support undergraduate and masters-level, as well as international PhD candidates gain global experience. Especially those with little to no prior experience.

=== C.V. Starr Scholarship ===
These scholarships support UNC students who demonstrate financial need to undertake an independent internationally oriented experience. They were established at UNC in 2004 by a donation from The Starr Foundation.
