= The Paradox of American Power =

2002 book by Joseph Nye

The Paradox of American Power is a book written by political scientist Joseph Nye and published in 2002.

According to Nye, a nation has never had as much cultural, economic, and military power as currently wields the United States of America. Yet, at the same time, a nation has never been so interdependent with the rest of the world. Nye describes "hard" and "soft" power and asserts that maintaining and maximizing soft power is fundamental to keeping the US in a privileged position, due to soft power being an effective and inexpensive tool of influence in the international arena.

Nye asserts that China, Japan, India, Russia, and the European Union have the pre-conditions necessary to be superpowers, although none can match the combination of soft power and hard power that the United States projects. As a result, Nye suggests that America should preserve and expand its multilateral engagements, as opposed to conducting a tactless unilateral foreign policy, which according to Nye will reduce global goodwill towards the United States and undermine the policy goals that rely on the engagement of foreign partners for their achievement.
