= Moon Chung-in =

South Korean diplomat (born 1951)

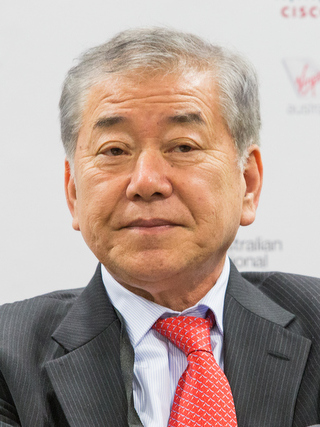
- Picture of Moon Chung-in at the CogitAsia conference on 29 June 2015
- Born: 25 March 1951 (age 75); Cheju, South Korea
- Education: Yonsei University (BA); University of Maryland, College Park (MA, PhD)
- Known for: Expertise in international relations and East Asian security issues. President Moon Jae-in's special advisor for unification, diplomacy and national security affairs. Sunshine Policy
- Scientific career
- Fields: Political science International relations Korean politics and political economy International politics of East Asia
- Workplaces: Yonsei University; University of California, San Diego; Duke University

Moon Chung-in (Korean: 문정인; Hanja: 文正仁; born 25 March 1951, in Jeju Province, South Korea) is the former Special Advisor to former President Moon Jae-in of South Korea for Foreign Affairs and National Security. He is also a Distinguished University Professor of Yonsei University, Krause Distinguished Fellow, School of Policy and Global Strategy, University of California, San Diego, and co-Convener of the Asia-Pacific Leadership Network for Nuclear Non-Proliferation and Disarmament (APLN). He is currently serving as the editor-in-chief of Global Asia. On 21 May 2017, Moon Chung-in was nominated by President Moon Jae-in as a special advisor on unification, diplomacy and national security affairs.

== Life ==
Dr. Moon majored in philosophy at Yonsei University and went to the United States in 1978 to study international relations at the University of Maryland where he received his master's and doctor's degrees. He got his first teaching job at Williams College in 1984. He moved to the University of Kentucky, Lexington in 1985 and taught there until 1994. He returned to Yonsei University, his alma mater, in 1994, and taught there until his retirement in 2016.

Moon was dean of the Graduate School of International Studies, Yonsei University. He has published over 60 books and 300 articles in edited volumes and scholarly journals. He also served as president of the Korea Peace Studies Association and Vice President of the International Studies Association (ISA) of North America. He was a recipient of the Public Policy Award (Woodrow Wilson International Center), the Lixian Scholarship (Beijing University), and the Pacific Leadership Fellowship (University of California, San Diego).

== Career ==
Moon has had a number of varied roles. He was an advisor to various agencies of the South Korean government, including the National Security Council, the Ministry of Foreign Affairs and Trade, the Ministry of Defense, the Ministry of Unification, and the National Intelligence Service. He served as Chairman of the Presidential Committee on National Intelligence Reform and a member of the Presidential Commission on Defense Reform during the Roh Moo-hyun administration. Dr. Moon was a special delegate to the first (2000) and second (2007) Korean summits, both of which were held in Pyongyang. He is currently a board member of the Pacific Century Institute, the Asia Research Fund, and the Korea Peace Forum. He was also chairman of the World Economic Forum’s Global Agenda Council on the Future of Korea.

Moon served as adviser to Kim Dae-jung, South Korea’s president from 1998 until 2003, and to Roh Moo-hyun, who held the presidency from 2003 until 2008. During the Roh Moo-hyun administration, he served as Ambassador for International Security Affairs of the Korean Ministry of Foreign Affairs and Trade (MOFAT) and Chairman of the Presidential Committee on Northeast Asian Cooperation Initiative, a cabinet-level post.

== Sunshine Policy ==
Moon was one of the architects of the Sunshine Policy, and advocates, and calls for, the revival of the engagement policy, which seeks the thawing of relations with North Korea and the Government of North Korea. Moon believes that every other option including sanctions and pressures, military actions, containment, and waiting for the regime in Pyongyang to collapse has failed. Moon has blamed US administrations, particularly that of former President George W. Bush, for disrupting the effects of the Sunshine Policy, which had some initial successes before the policy was cancelled in 2008.

In a contribution to Foreign Affairs in April 2018, Moon argues it would be difficult to justify the ongoing presence of U.S. forces in South Korea after the adoption of a North-South peace accord. In a 2018 interview, Moon stated it would be in the best interest of South Korea to abolish the U.S.-South Korea alliance in the long run. At an international conference held by the National Diplomatic Academy's Institute of Foreign Affairs and National Security in April 2019, Moon posed a hypothetical to China “If U.S. Forces Korea withdraws its troops from South Korea without North Korea's denuclearization, what would it be like for China to provide a nuclear umbrella for South Korea and negotiate with North Korea in that state?” In a column written in The Hankyoreh, Moon believes that South Korea should focus more attention on their economic relationship with North Korea than on their alliance with the United States.

== Selected publications ==
- Chung-in Moon (1988). The Korean economy in transition: political consequences of neoconservative reforms. Asian/Pacific Studies Institute, Duke University.
- CHUNG IN MOON (1996). Arms Control on the Korean Peninsula: Domestic Perceptions, Regional Dynamics, International Penetrations. 연세대학교출판부. ISBN 978-89-7141-412-5.
- Chung-in Moon (8 August 1999). Air power dynamics and Korean security. Yonsei University Press. ISBN 978-89-7141-474-3.
- Chung-in Moon (2012). The Sunshine Policy. Yonsei University Press. ISBN 978-89-7141-479-8.
- Chung-in Moon. Exploring the Future of China (in Korean 2010 in Korean and 2012 in Chinese).

=== With Collaborators ===
- Chung-in Moon (1984). Political Economy of the Third World Bilateralism: The Saudi Arabian-Korean Connection, 1973-1983. University of Maryland.
- Ronald De McLaurin; Chung-In Moon (1989). The United States and the Defense of the Pacific. Westview Press. ISBN 978-0-8133-7917-3.
- Azar, Edward E.; Moon, Chung-in (1988). National security in the third world: the management of internal and external threats. Edward Elgar. ISBN 9781852780791.
- Haggard, Stephan; Byung-Kook, Kim; Moon, Chung-in (1990). The Transition to Export-led Growth in South Korea, 1954-66. World Bank Publications. GGKEY:14R769N4PYL.
- Moon, Chung-In; Steinberg, David I. Steinberg (1999). Kim Dae-Jung Government and Sunshine Policy: Promises and Challenges. 연세대학교출판부. ISBN 978-89-7141-493-4.
- Kil, Sŭng-hŭm; Moon, Chung-in (14 June 2001). Understanding Korean Politics: An Introduction. SUNY Press. ISBN 978-0-7914-4889-2.
- Chung-in Moon; Masao Okonogi; Mitchell Reiss (2000). The Perry report, the missile quagmire, and the North Korean question. Yonsei University Press. ISBN 978-89-7141-508-5.
- G. John Ikenberry and Chung-in Moon, The U.S. and Northeast Asia (Rowman & Littlefield, 2008) ISBN 9780742556386
- Masao Okonogi and Chung-in Moon, East Asia Community: Ideas and Debates (Keio University Press, 2010 in Japanese and Korean).
- Chung-in Moon and Seung-won Suh, What Does Japan Think Now? (in Korean 2013, in Chinese 2017).
- Peter Hayes and Chung-in Moon (eds.) The Future of East Asia (Palgrave-Macmillan, 2017).
