= Correlates of War =

Academic study of the history of warfare

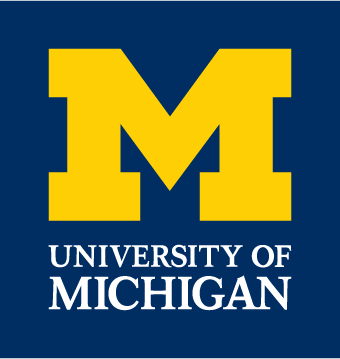
University of Michigan logo

The Correlates of War project is an academic study of the history of warfare. It was started in 1963 at the University of Michigan by political scientist J. David Singer. Concerned with collecting data about the history of wars and conflict among states, the project has driven forward quantitative research into the causes of warfare. The Correlates of War project seeks to facilitate the collection, dissemination, and use of accurate and reliable quantitative data in international relations. Key principles of the project include a commitment to standard scientific principles of replication, data reliability, documentation, review, and the transparency of data collection procedures.

The project has collected data on many attributes of international politics and national capabilities over time. Available data collected by the Correlates of War project start in 1816. The most widely used databases developed by the project include an identification of independent states since 1816, a list of interstate and civil wars since 1816, a list of "militarized disputes" (militarized crises that end short of war), and national capabilities measured annually for all countries since 1816 (including the size of countries' military, their energy consumption as a proxy for industrialization, population size, urbanized population, and raw material production of iron and steel). Other databases include an identification of all alliances since 1816, territorial relationships and changes over time, and membership in intergovernmental organizations. All Correlates of War databases are available free for public and academic use with proper citation.

In addition to generating these several data sets and constructing quantitative indicators of key variables that might turn out to be correlates of war, the project has completed and published a variety of statistical analyses and hypotheses. The data has also been used by researchers examining such relationships and seeking to explain when countries go to war or avoid it, when they trade, when they form alliances (and the effect of such alliances), and so on.

The project was transferred to Penn State University in March 2001. The co-directors since 2022 are Jeff Carter and Scott Wolford professors at Appalachian State University and the University of Texas, respectively.

== Country codes ==
Singer's group used a three-digit identification code for states (per the system since the Congress of Vienna) in their dataset correlated loosely with geography. The code was published in 1968 and 1980 to ease interoperability between researchers' datasets, and it became an important part of historical data science.

The main criteria to be identified as a state for the purpose of CoW are membership in the League of Nations or the United Nations, or a population of at least 500,000 and diplomatic recognition by two major powers. For membership to change, the status of a state must be changed for at least one month. Other criteria may include territorial occupation, and having an independent foreign policy and sovereign authority so that satellite states are excluded.

Researchers have modified CoW's encodings for their specific needs, or have offered improved systems.

== Categories of wars ==
The Correlates of War web site provides separate data sets (in different formats) for four different categories of wars:

- Non-State Wars: Between or among non-state entities.
- Intra-State Wars: Predominantly take place within the recognized territory of a state.
- Inter-State Wars: Occur between or among recognized states.
- Extra-State Wars: Between one or more states and a non-state entity outside the borders of the state.

The COW data includes a "WarType" variable assuming integer values 1-9. Interstate wars all have WarType 1. Extra-state wars are either "colonial" (WarType 2) to maintain control of a particular colony or "imperial" (WarType 3) to extend an empire. Intra-state wars are classified as either a civil war for central control (WarType 4), a civil war over local issues (WarType 5) a regional internal war (WarType 6), or an intercommunal war (WarType 7). Non-state wars are classified by whether they take place in non-state territory (WarType 8) or across state borders (WarType 9).

In each of these cases, a "war must involve sustained combat, involving organized armed forces, resulting in a minimum of 1,000 battle-related combatant fatalities within a twelve month period."

== Sources ==
- "The Correlates of War Project". 2022.
- Miller, Steven V. (2021-12-24). "A Discussion of the Two State Systems (CoW, G-W)". {peacesciencer}: An R Package for Quantitative Peace Science Research Conflict Management and Peace Science.
- Sarkees, Meredith Reid; Wayman, Frank (February 2010). Resort to War: 1816–2007. SAGE Publications. ISBN 9780872894341.
- Russett, Bruce; Singer, J. David; Small, Melvin (1968). "National Political Units in the Twentieth Century". American Political Science Review. 62 (3): 932–951. doi:10.2307/1953441. JSTOR 1953441. S2CID 146843307.
- Gleditsch, Kristian S.; Ward, Michael D. (1999). "A revised list of independent states since the congress of Vienna". Empirical and Theoretical Research in International Relations. 25 (4): 393–413. doi:10.1080/03050629908434958.
