= Global Asia =

Quarterly English-language magazine

- Editor-in-chief: Chung-in Moon
- Categories: International relations
- Frequency: Quarterly
- Founded: 2006
- Country: South Korea
- Based in: Seoul
- Website: www.globalasia.org
- ISSN: 1976-068X

Global Asia is a quarterly magazine published by the East Asia Foundation. Similar in concept to Foreign Policy and Foreign Affairs, Global Asia deals with global issues, but with a special focus on Asia. The editor-in-chief is Chung-in Moon of Yonsei University.

Previous issues have covered topics such as: North Korea and weapons of mass destruction, the 2012 Nuclear Security Summit, China's peaceful rise, economic development in India, the 2008 financial crisis, and green growth.

Some of Global Asia's notable contributors include:

- Vinod Aggarwal
- Charles K. Armstrong
- Ban Ki-moon, Walden Bello
- Walter Clemens, Jr.
- Gerald Curtis
- Barry Eichengreen
- G. John Ikenberry
- Boris Johnson
- Kim Dae-jung
- Lee Myung-bak
- Barry Naughton
- Gary Samore
- David Shambaugh
- Heizō Takenaka
- Shashi Tharoor
- Yun Byung-se
