= Composite Index of National Capability =

Statistical measure of national power

The Composite Index of National Capability (CINC) is a statistical measure of national power created by J. David Singer for the Correlates of War project in 1963. It uses an average of percentages of world totals in six different components. The components represent demographic, economic, and military strength. More recent studies tend to use the (CINC) score, which “focuses on measures that are more salient to the perception of true state power” beyond GDP. It is still “among the best-known and most accepted methods for measuring national capabilities.” The CINC only measures hard powers and may not represent total national power.

== Methodology ==
Each component is a dimensionless percentage of the world's total.

RATIO=$\frac{Country}{World}$

CINC = $\frac{TPR + UPR + ISPR + ECR + MER + MPR} {6}$

Where

TPR = total population of country ratio

UPR = urban population of country ratio

ISPR = iron and steel production of country ratio

ECR = primary energy consumption ratio

MER = military expenditure ratio

MPR = military personnel ratio

== List of countries by CINC ==
Countries listed by and CINC, data is from 2007.

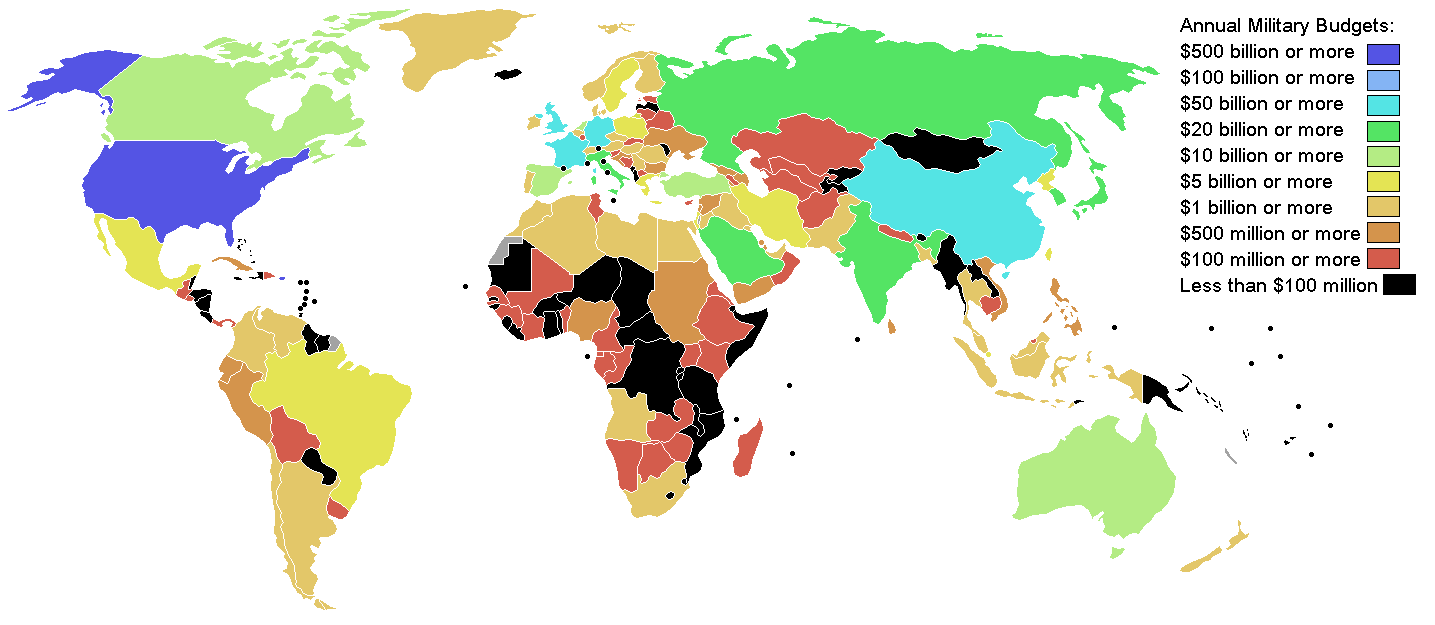
Military expenditure of every world country 2023

Number	Country	CINC
1	China	.198566
2	United States	.142149
3	India	.073444
4	Japan	.042675
5	Russia	.039274
6	Brazil	.024545
7	Germany	.024082
8	South Korea	.023878
9	United Kingdom	.021158
10	France	.018924
11	Italy	.017420
12	Turkey	.014317
13	Pakistan	.013772
14	Indonesia	.013708
15	Iran	.013450
16	North Korea	.012925
17	Mexico	.012269
18	Ukraine	.011835
19	Spain	.011389
20	Saudi Arabia	.010883
21	Canada	.010683
22	Egypt	.009713
23	Bangladesh	.008060
24	Taiwan	.008010
25	Thailand	.007973
26	Nigeria	.007792
27	Australia	.007612
28	Vietnam	.007113
29	Poland	.006939
30	Myanmar	.006395
31	South Africa	.006316
32	Colombia	.006174
33	Philippines	.005722
34	Netherlands	.005646
35	Algeria	.005290
36	Iraq	.005222
37	Argentina	.004721
38	Venezuela	.004559
39	Morocco	.004471
40	Syria	.004454
41	Malaysia	.004403
42	Democratic Republic of the Congo	.004175
43	Ethiopia	.003895
44	Belgium	.003858
45	Greece	.003813
46	Israel	.003638
47	Kazakhstan	.003233
48	Singapore	.003226
49	Romania	.003213
50	Sudan	.003107
51	Chile	.003076
52	Peru	.002986
53	United Arab Emirates	.002980
54	Austria	.002979
55	Angola	.002572
56	Sweden	.002557
57	Belarus	.002483
58	Czech Republic	.002353
59	Uzbekistan	.002256
60	Eritrea	.002157
61	Finland	.002144
62	Tanzania	.002078
63	Sri Lanka	.001932
64	Portugal	.001841
65	Kenya	.001777
66	Libya	.001763
67	Norway	.001640
68	Cambodia	.001608
69	Hungary	.001556
70	Ecuador	.001556
71	Yemen	.001518
72	Denmark	.001493
73	Jordan	.001448
74	Nepal	.001437
75	Afghanistan	.001433
76	Bulgaria	.001422
77	Slovakia	.001420
78	Kuwait	.001352
79	Cuba	.001334
80	Uganda	.001320
81	Azerbaijan	.001279
82	Oman	.001217
83	Ivory Coast	.001173
84	Ghana	.001109
85	Switzerland	.001083
86	Bolivia	.001050
87	Zimbabwe	.001032
88	Mozambique	.000994
89	Dominican Republic	.000974
90	Cameroon	.000969
91	Serbia	.000951
92	Qatar	.000884
93	Lebanon	.000844
94	Tunisia	.000822
95	Guatemala	.000789
96	New Zealand	.000771
97	Zambia	.000749
98	Turkmenistan	.000711
99	Madagascar	.000697
100	Burkina Faso	.000659
101	Senegal	.000645
102	Ireland	.000635
103	Armenia	.000614
104	Rwanda	.000581
105	Croatia	.000580
106	El Salvador	.000575
107	Chad	.000568
108	Burundi	.000562
109	Haiti	.000542
110	Somalia	.000531
111	Malawi	.000527
112	Mali	.000516
113	Niger	.000505
114	Georgia	.000504
115	Uruguay	.000474
116	Laos	.000471
117	Guinea	.000458
118	Honduras	.000454
119	Paraguay	.000450
120	Lithuania	.000442
121	Luxembourg	.000428
122	Bosnia and Herzegovina	.000400
123	Sierra Leone	.000393
124	Bahrain	.000390
125	Nicaragua	.000388
126	Benin	.000370
127	Congo	.000361
128	Kyrgyzstan	.000357
129	Trinidad and Tobago	.000354
130	Tajikistan	.000352
131	Slovenia	.000346
132	Moldova	.000346
133	Latvia	.000345
134	Togo	.000297
135	Mauritania	.000290
136	Albania	.000276
137	North Macedonia	.000270
138	Estonia	.000253
139	Mongolia	.000249
140	Costa Rica	.000240
141	Papua New Guinea	.000237
142	Liberia	.000223
143	Central African Republic	.000206
144	Cyprus	.000202
145	Panama	.000196
146	Jamaica	.000192
147	Botswana	.000187
148	Namibia	.000179
149	Gabon	.000153
150	Brunei	.000150
151	Djibouti	.000145
152	Montenegro	.000133
153	Guinea-Bissau	.000132
154	Timor-Leste	.000113
155	Equatorial Guinea	.000109
156	Lesotho	.000098
157	Fiji	.000081
158	Mauritius	.000062
159	Suriname	.000058
160	Swaziland	.000057
161	Gambia	.000051
162	Guyana	.000049
163	Bhutan	.000046
164	Bahamas	.000044
165	Iceland	.000043
166	Maldives	.000035
167	Malta	.000029
168	Comoros	.000024
169	Cape Verde	.000022
170	Belize	.000021
171	Barbados	.000020
172	Solomon Islands	.000013
173	Sao Tome and Principe	.000006
174	Vanuatu	.000006
175	Samoa	.000005
176	Saint Lucia	.000005
177	Seychelles	.000004
178	San Marino	.000003
179	Monaco	.000003
180	Antigua and Barbuda	.000003
181	Federated States of Micronesia	.000003
182	Grenada	.000003
183	Saint Vincent and the Grenadines	.000003
184	Tonga	.000003
185	Andorra	.000003
186	Kiribati	.000002
187	Dominica	.000002
188	Liechtenstein	.000002
189	Saint Kitts and Nevis	.000002
190	Marshall Islands	.000001
191	Palau	.000001
192	Nauru	.000000
193	Tuvalu	.000000

== Reference works ==
- Singer, Joel David: The Correlates of War. Testing some Realpolitik Models. New York: The Free Press, 1980.
