= Nye Initiative =

1995 American security report

The Nye Initiative (or "Nye Report" or "East Asia Strategic Report"), named after former Assistant Secretary of Defense for International Security Affairs Joseph S. Nye, Jr., more officially known as the United States Security Strategy for the East Asia Pacific Region, published in February 1995, is a report on the United States security strategy toward East Asia and the Pacific area, emphasizing the importance of the U.S. forward presence in Asia and its alliance with Japan.

The aim of this plan was to reassure Japan and other states in the region of U.S. commitments to the alliance after a series of security crises in the early 1990s. It argued that U.S. military presence in the region had important consequences for the stability of the region, and for the success of America's political, economic, and security goals. Specifically, Nye advocated that the United States should maintain a total of 100,000 troops in East Asia, emphasizing the importance of the U.S. Marine Corps and other military forces in Okinawa. While maintaining the U.S.-Japan alliance, it also aimed to check the structural forces, such as the rise of China and development of nuclear weapons capability by North Korea.

The Nye Initiative had defined U.S.-Japan relations as the most important bilateral relationship and the Japanese security as the linchpin of the U.S. security policy in the region, helping Japan gain greater military autonomy and power projection capability in the future. Such process of re-strengthening the U.S.-Japan security tie was not forced or imposed by any of the two, but rather a product of the mutual recognition of each other's needs and interests.
