= Jacek Kugler =

American political scientist

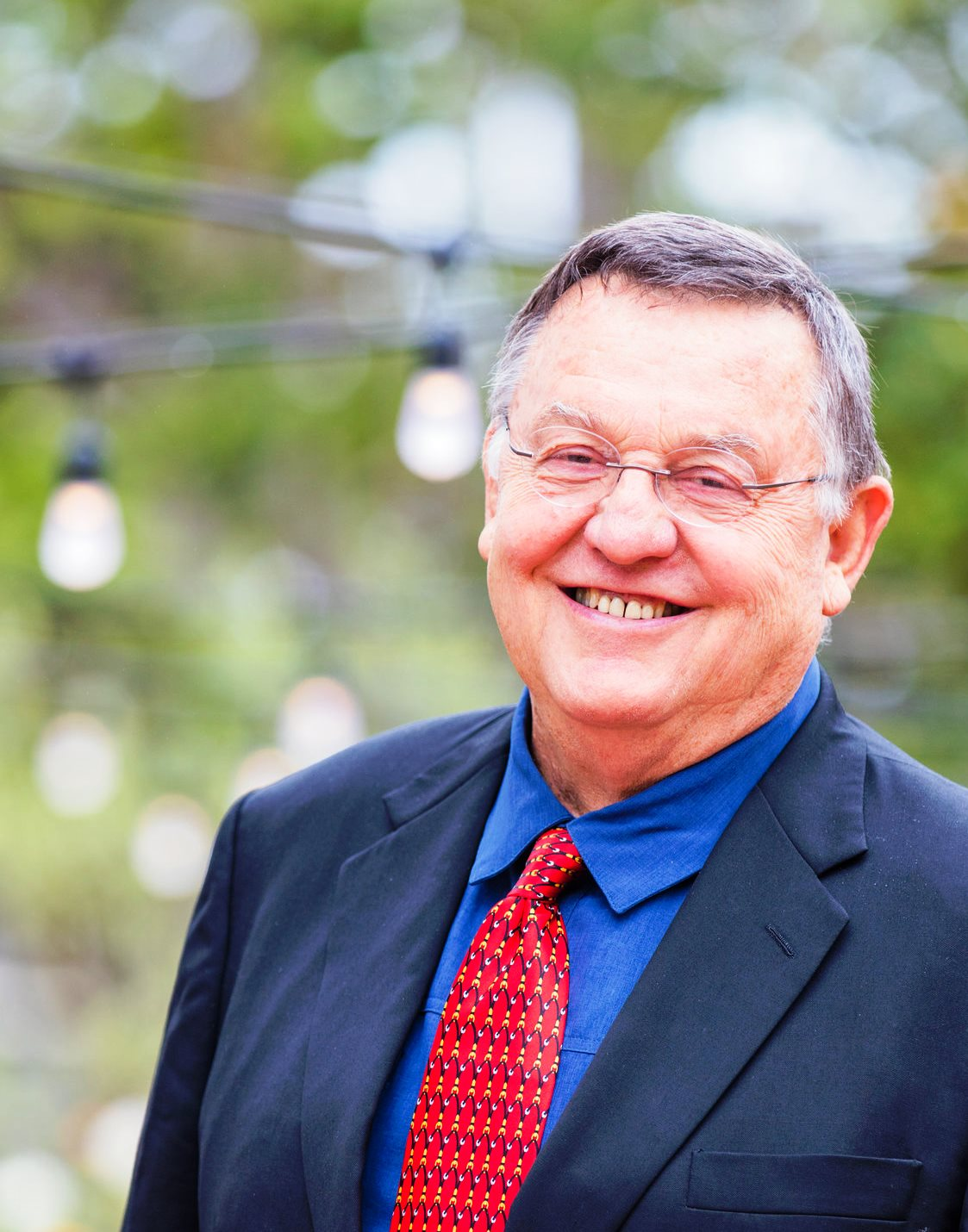
- Born: March 19, 1942 (age 84); Mstyczów, Poland
- Education: University of California, Los Angeles, University of Michigan
- Known for: Power transition theory
- Scientific career
- Fields: Political Science
- Workplaces: Claremont Graduate University, Vanderbilt University, Boston University

Jacek Kugler (born March 19, 1942) is an American political scientist and scholar of International Relations. He is the former chair of the Department of Politics and Policy at Claremont Graduate University in Claremont, California.

Kugler is one of the founders of Power Transition Theory in International Relations Theory. His work on economic consequences of war, long term power transitions and political performance of nations have been widely debated within the field of international relations. He is a student of A.F.K Organski.

He is currently the Elisabeth Helm Rosecrans Professor of International Relations and Political Economy in the Department of International Studies, School of Politics and Economics. Kugler is former Fulbright scholar and research fellow at the Nobel Peace Prize Institute. He was President of International Studies Association (2004-5) and Peace Science Society (1995-6). He was also editor of International Interactions, and editor for special issue of Journal of Conflict Resolution and International Studies Review. He is also a founding member of the TransResearch Consortium.

== Education ==
Kugler received B.A. and M.A. from University of California, Los Angeles, and Ph.D. in political science from University of Michigan (1973) where he studied and worked with A.F.K. Organski.

== Career ==
Before joining CGU, he taught at Vanderbilt University and Boston University. He was also visiting professor at UCLA, California Institute of Technology, and National Defense University. In addition, he was research scholar at the Center for International Affairs, Harvard University, and Project co-director at the Center for Political Studies, University of Michigan.

Kugler is an expert on war, peace, deterrence, power transition theory, formal decision making, political economy, economic development, and political demography. Through extensive publications on the causes and consequences of war, he has forged a reputation for innovative formal modeling and empirical analysis. His extensions of the theory of power transition explain the initiation of World War I and II and account for peaceful relations among major powers during the Cold War. Professor Kugler is pioneering a new perspective on world politics that logically and empirically challenges well-established formulations of the realist school. His formal work on policy advances agent based models that can anticipate the outcome of complex negotiations and provides systematic aid to policy makers involved in day-to-day decisions.

Kugler's research was funded by National Science Foundation, Defense Advanced Research Projects Agency (DARPA), and the Ford Foundation, etc. He has been a consultant to the International Monetary Fund, the World Bank, Department of State, Department of Defense and a number of U.S agencies and private businesses. He founded the Sentia Group Inc. with Mark Abdollahian for the formal study of decision making, policy analysis and advice.

== Bibliography ==
- Power Transitions: Strategies for the 21st Century (with A.F.K. Organski, Ronald L. Tammen, Douglas Lemke, Carole Alsharabati, Brian Efird), CSQ press, 2000.
- Birth, Death and Taxes: Political and Demographic Transition (with A.F.K. Organski, T. Johnson, and Y. Cohen), The University of Chicago Press, 1984.
- The War Ledger (with A. F. K. Organski), The University of Chicago Press, 1980.
- Foundations of Power Transition Theory (with Tammen, Ronald, Jacek Kugler and Douglas Lemke), Oxford Encyclopedia of Empirical Relations theory, William Thompson, editor, 2017.
- The Asian Ascent, International Studies Perspectives, 2006, 7, 36–42.

== ISA Student Paper Award ==
Jacek Kugler Political Demography and Geography Student Paper Award was established in 2014 to recognize the best paper with a political demography and geography theme presented at the International Studies Association (ISA) Annual Convention. Graduate students presenting at ISA are allowed to apply for the award which is screened by a committee that conduct a blind review of all nominated papers and is responsible for choosing the winner and two runners-up for the award.
