= Hal Brands =

American historian (born 1983)

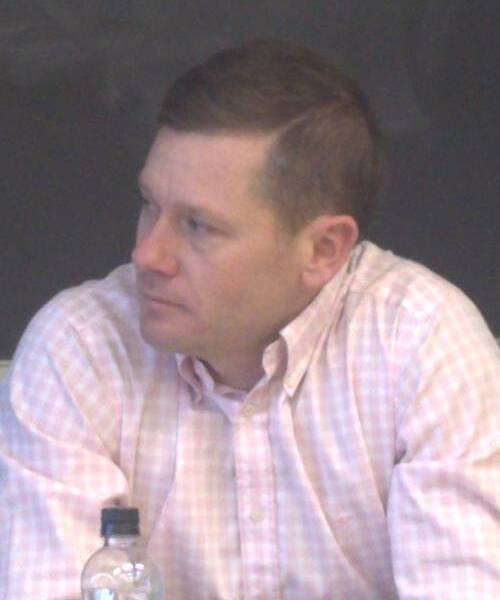
- Brands in 2026
- Born: 1983 (age 42–43)
- Relatives: H. W. Brands (father)

Academic background
- Education: Stanford University (BA); Yale University (MA, MPhil, PhD)

Academic work
- Discipline: Political science, history
- Main interests: United States foreign policy
- Website: Official website

Hal Brands (born 1983) is an American columnist and scholar of US foreign policy. He is the Henry A. Kissinger Distinguished Professor of Global Affairs at the School of Advanced International Studies (SAIS) at Johns Hopkins University, as well as a resident scholar at the American Enterprise Institute.

== Education ==
Brands holds a BA in history and political science from Stanford University and an MA, MPhil, and PhD in history from Yale University.

== Personal life ==
Brands' father is the historian H. W. Brands.

== Publications ==
=== Books ===
- From Berlin to Baghdad : America's Search for Purpose in the Post-Cold War World (2008)
- Latin America's Cold War (2010)
- What Good is Grand Strategy? Power and Purpose in American Statecraft from Harry S. Truman to George W. Bush (2014)
- Making the Unipolar Moment: U.S. Foreign Policy and the Rise of the Post-Cold War Order (2016)
- American Grand Strategy in the Age of Trump (2018)
- The Lessons of Tragedy (2019) (co-authored with Charles Edel)
- The Twilight Struggle: What the Cold War Teaches Us about Great-Power Rivalry Today (2022)
- Danger Zone: The Coming Conflict with China (2022) (co-authored with Michael Beckley)
- The New Makers of Modern Strategy. From the Ancient World to the Digital Age (2023)
- The Eurasian Century: Hot Wars, Cold Wars, and the Making of the Modern World (2025)

=== Articles ===
- "An 'America First' World", Foreign Affairs, May 27, 2024
- "Putting ‘Asia First’ Could Cost America the World", Bloomberg, August 26, 2024
- "How Primed for War Is China?", Foreign Policy, February 4, 2024 (co-authored with Michael Beckley)
- Critical Assumptions and American Grand Strategy by Hal Brands, Peter Feaver, William Inboden & Paul D. Miller
- The case for Bush revisionism: Reevaluating the legacy of America’s 43rd President by Hal Brands & Peter Feaver
