= Joseph Nye =

American political scientist (1937–2025)

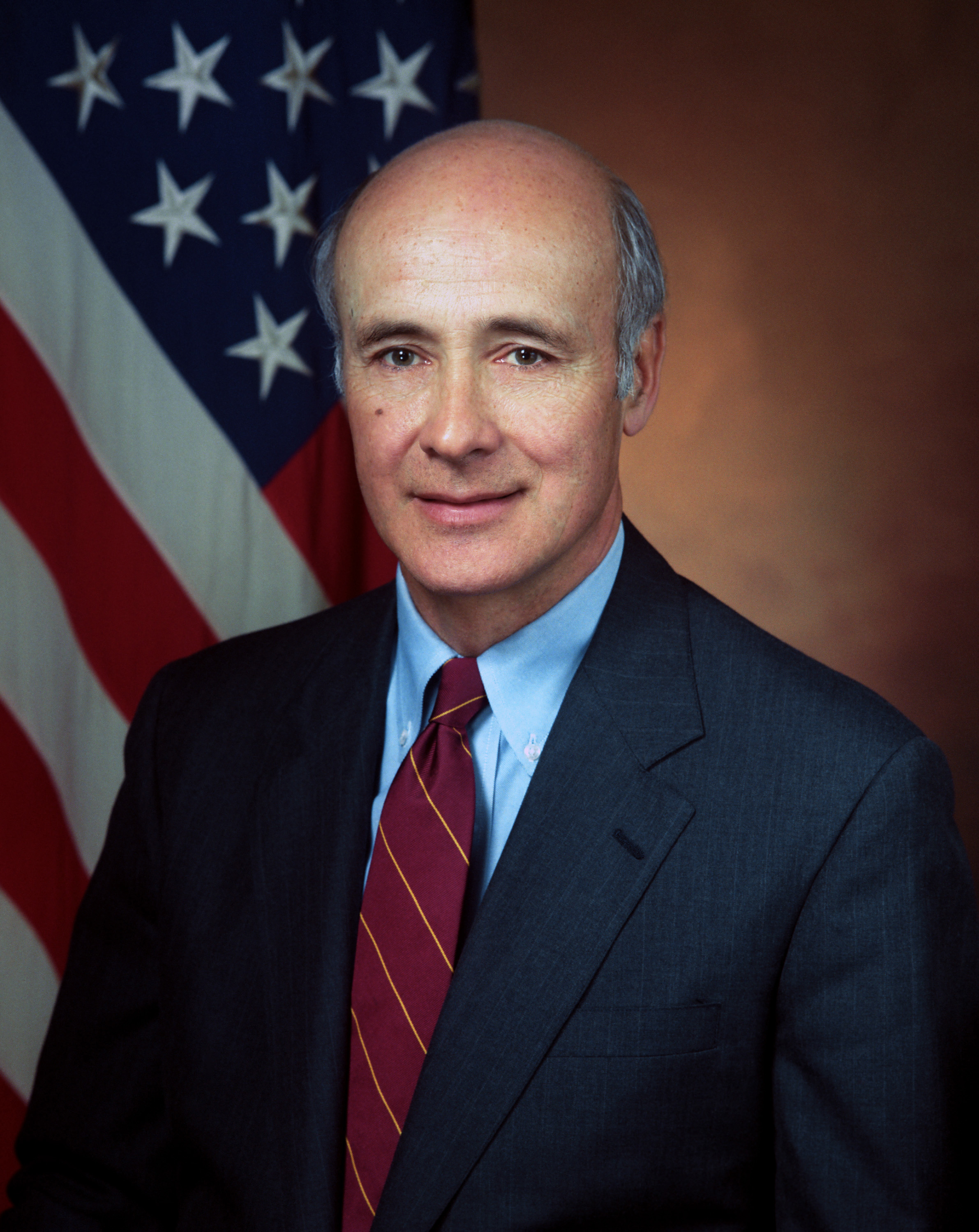
- Official portrait, 1994

Assistant Secretary of Defense for International Security Affairs
- In office September 15, 1994 – December 16, 1995
- President: Bill Clinton
- Preceded by: Chas Freeman
- Succeeded by: Franklin Kramer

Chair of the National Intelligence Council
- In office February 20, 1993 – September 15, 1994
- President: Bill Clinton
- Preceded by: Fritz Ermarth
- Succeeded by: Christine Williams

Personal details
- Born: Joseph Samuel Nye Jr. January 19, 1937 South Orange, New Jersey, U.S.
- Died: May 6, 2025 (aged 88) Cambridge, Massachusetts, U.S.
- Education: Princeton University (BA); Exeter College, Oxford (MA); Harvard University (PhD)

Joseph Samuel Nye Jr. (January 19, 1937 – May 6, 2025) was an American political scientist and historian. He and Robert Keohane co-founded the international relations theory of neoliberalism, which they developed in their 1977 book Power and Interdependence. Together with Keohane, he developed the concepts of asymmetrical and complex interdependence. They also explored transnational relations and world politics in an edited volume in the 1970s. More recently, he pioneered the theory of soft power. His notion of "smart power" ("the ability to combine hard and soft power into a successful strategy") became popular with the use of this phrase by members of the Clinton Administration and the Obama Administration.

Nye was the Dean of the John F. Kennedy School of Government at Harvard University, where he later held the position of University Distinguished Service Professor, emeritus. In October 2014, US Secretary of State John Kerry appointed Nye to the Foreign Affairs Policy Board. He was also a member of the Defense Policy Board. He was a Harvard faculty member since 1964. He was a fellow of the American Academy of Arts & Sciences, a foreign fellow of the British Academy, and a member of the American Academy of Diplomacy.

The 2011 Teaching, Research, and International Policy (TRIP) survey of over 1,700 international relations scholars ranked Nye as the sixth most influential scholar in the field of international relations in the past 20 years. He was also ranked as one of the most influential figures in American foreign policy. In 2011, Foreign Policy magazine included him on its list of top global thinkers. In September 2014, Foreign Policy reported that international relations scholars and policymakers ranked Nye as one of the field's most influential scholars.

== Early life, family and education ==
Nye was born in South Orange, New Jersey, the third of four children born to Joseph, a bond trader and equities firm lead; and Else Ashwell Nye. Joseph Sr. did not graduate high school or college, but Else was a college graduate. Joseph Jr. had two older sisters and a younger sister. For most of his youth, the family resided on a 100-acre (40 ha) farm in New Vernon, New Jersey.

He attended Morristown Prep (later the Morristown–Beard School) in Morristown, New Jersey, graduating in 1954. He then attended Princeton University, also in New Jersey, where he was vice president of the Colonial Club, a columnist for The Daily Princetonian, and a member of the American Whig–Cliosophic Society's Debate Panel. He graduated summa cum laude with a B.A. in history in 1958. His senior thesis was Death of a Family Firm: An Entrepreneurial History of the American Preserve Company. Nye was a member of Phi Beta Kappa and won the Myron T. Herrick Thesis Prize. He was among 32 students selected as a Rhodes Scholar and chose to attend Oxford University's Exeter College, where he studied Philosophy, Politics and Economics (PPE).

In 1964, he obtained his PhD in political science from Harvard University, studying under Henry Kissinger and J. K. Galbraith. Nye's doctoral dissertation was on regional integration in East Africa.

== Career ==
In 1964, the same year Nye received his doctorate, he joined the Harvard faculty. He was Director of the Center for Science and International Affairs at John F. Kennedy School of Government from 1985 to 1990 and was Associate Dean for International Affairs at Harvard from 1989 to 1992. In 1968, he became the Carnegie Endowment International Peace Scholar and taught at the Geneva Graduate Institute. Nye also was Director of the Center for International Affairs at Harvard from 1989 to 1993 and Dean of John F. Kennedy School of Government from 1995 to 2004. Nye was a University Distinguished Service Professor, emeritus.

Nye and his colleague Keohane have been characterized as key figures in the development of a discipline of international political economy, largely as a result of their authorship of Power and Interdependence. Nye's influences include Karl Deutsch and Ernst Hass.

From 1977 to 1979, Nye was Deputy to the Undersecretary of State for Security Assistance, Science, and Technology and chaired the National Security Council Group on Nonproliferation of Nuclear Weapons. In recognition of his service, he was awarded the State Department's Distinguished Honor Award in 1979. In 1993 and 1994, he was Chairman of the National Intelligence Council, which coordinates intelligence estimates for the President, and was awarded the Intelligence Community's Distinguished Service Medal. In the Clinton Administration from 1994 to 1995, Nye served as Assistant Secretary of Defense for International Security Affairs, and was awarded the Department's Distinguished Service Medal with Oak Leaf Cluster. He was responsible for the Nye Initiative and co-wrote a series of reports on the Japan-US alliance with his friend Richard Armitage. In 1999, during a visit to Singapore, Nye suggested to Lee Kuan Yew that Singapore should set up a version of London's Speaker's Corner at Hyde Park to allow public speaking, which Singapore then created its own Speaker's Corner at Hong Lim Park in 2000. Nye was considered by many to be the preferred choice for National Security Advisor in the 2004 presidential campaign of John Kerry.

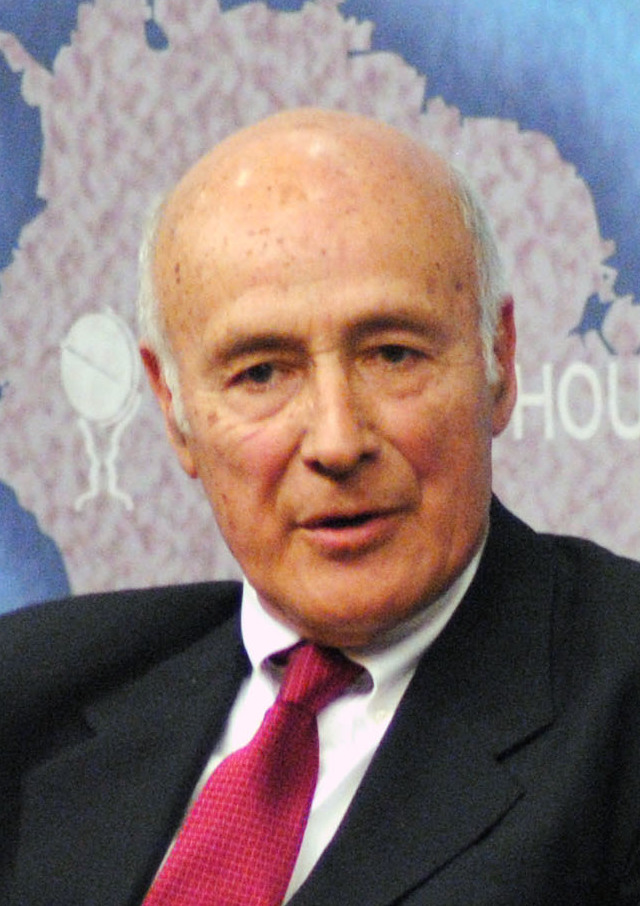
Nye in 2013

He was the chairman of the North American branch of the Trilateral Commission and the co-chair of the Aspen Strategy Group. He was also a member of the Atlantic Council's Board of Directors. Nye also served as a trustee of Radcliffe College and Wells College. He was on the board of directors of the Council on Foreign Relations, the Guiding Coalition of the Project on National Security Reform, the advisory board of Carolina for Kibera, and the Board of the Center for Strategic and International Studies. He was awarded the Woodrow Wilson Prize by Princeton University and the Charles E. Merriman Prize by the American Political Science Association. In 2005, he was awarded the Honorary Patronage of the University Philosophical Society of Trinity College Dublin and was awarded honorary degrees by ten colleges and universities. In 2010, Nye won the Foreign Policy Distinguished Scholar Award from the International Studies Association. In 2009, he was made a Theodore Roosevelt Fellow of the American Academy of Political and Social Science.

In October 2014, US Secretary of State John Kerry appointed Nye to the Foreign Affairs Policy Board, a group that meets periodically to discuss strategic questions and to provide the Secretary and other senior department officials with independent informed perspectives and ideas. In November 2014, Nye was awarded the Order of the Rising Sun, Gold and Silver Star in recognition of his "contribution to the development of studies on Japan-U.S. security and to the promotion of the mutual understanding between Japan and the United States."

Nye served as a Commissioner for the Global Commission on Internet Governance, and served on the Global Commission on the Stability of Cyberspace from 2017 until its conclusion in 2019. He served on the global Advisory Council for CFK Africa, a leading NGO working in Kenyan informal settlements.

Nye coined the term soft power in the late 1980s, and it first came into widespread usage following a piece he wrote in Foreign Policy in 1990. Nye consistently wrote for Project Syndicate since 2002.

== Significant views ==
Nye was a neo-liberal.

In Nye's view, analysis of collective security systems requires consideration of economic matters. Matters of collective economic security include common goods, the presence or absence of trade restrictions, and distribution of profits between countries.

== Personal life ==
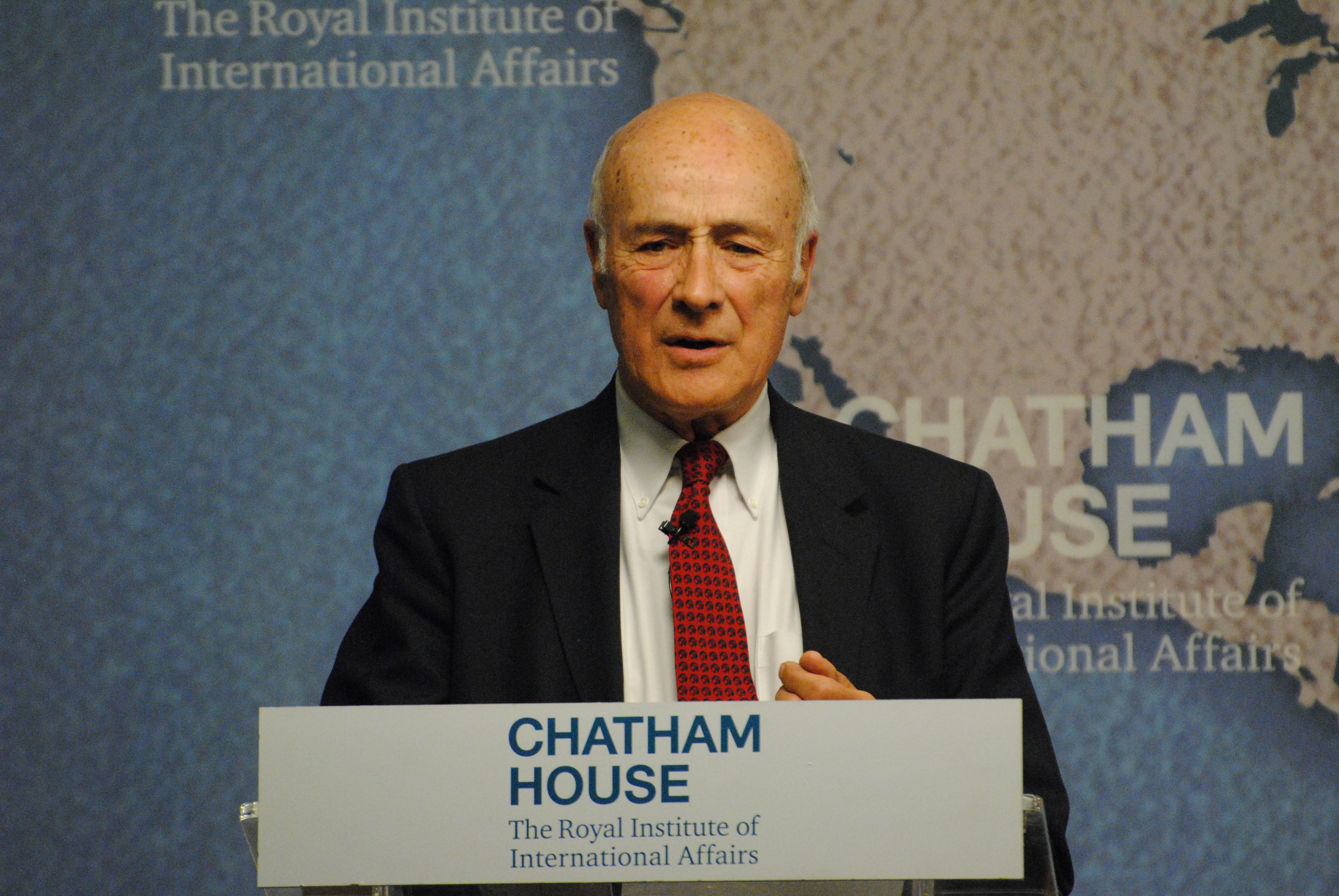
Nye in 2015

Nye married Molly (Mary) Harding in 1961. They had three sons: John, Benjamin and Daniel. Nye was a member of a Unitarian Universalist Association church. Molly was a ceramics artist, art gallery leader and art consultant. She died about five months before her husband.

Nye resided in Lexington, Massachusetts, as well as in Europe, East Africa, and Central America, and he traveled to over 90 countries. His hobbies commonly involved the outdoors; he enjoyed camping, fly fishing, hiking, gardening (including horticultural activities at his 900-acre (360 ha) New Hampshire tree farm). He played squash and was an avid skier.

Nye's last residence was at Brookhaven, a retirement community in Lexington. He died at Mount Auburn Hospital in Cambridge, Massachusetts, on May 6, 2025, at the age of 88.

== Bibliography ==
=== Books ===
- Pan-Africanism and East African Integration. Harvard University Press. 1965. ISBN 978-0-674-42138-7.
- Peace in Parts: Integration and Conflict in Regional Organization. Little, Brown. 1971.
- Keohane, Robert O.; Nye, Joseph S. (1972). Transnational Relations and World Politics. Harvard University Press. ISBN 978-0-674-59315-2.
- Keohane, Robert O.; Nye, Joseph S. (1977). Power and Interdependence. World Politics in Transition. Little, Brown. ISBN 978-0-316-48936-2.
- Carnesale, Albert (1983). Living with nuclear weapons. Internet Archive. Cambridge, Massachusetts: Harvard Nuclear Study Group, Harvard University Press. ISBN 978-0-674-53665-4.
- Allison, Graham T.; Carnesale, Albert; Nye, Joseph (October 1, 1985). "Hawks, doves and owls: a new perspective on avoiding nuclear war". International Affairs. 61 (4): 581–589. doi:10.2307/2617704. ISSN 0020-5850. JSTOR 2617704.
- Nuclear ethics. New York: Free Pr. 1988. ISBN 978-0-02-923091-6.
- Bound to lead: the changing nature of American power (5. [pr.] ed.). New York: Basic Books. 1992. ISBN 978-0-465-00744-8.
- Understanding International Conflicts, 6/E. Pearson Education. September 2007. ISBN 978-81-317-1632-8.
- The Paradox of American Power: Why the World's Only Superpower Can't Go It Alone. Oxford University Press. 2002. ISBN 978-0-19-983963-6.
- Soft Power: The Means To Success In World Politics. Public Affairs. 2004.
- Power in the Global Information Age. Routledge. April 28, 2004. ISBN 978-1-135-99653-6.
- The Power Game. PublicAffairs. November 9, 2004. ISBN 978-1-58648-226-8.
- The Powers to Lead. Oxford University Press. March 3, 2008. ISBN 978-0-19-975853-1.
- The Future of Power. New York: PublicAffairs. February 1, 2011. ISBN 978-1-58648-892-5.
- Presidential Leadership and the Creation of the American Era. Princeton (N.J.): Princeton University Press. 2013. ISBN 978-0-691-15836-5.
- Is the American Century Over?. John Wiley & Sons. March 5, 2015. ISBN 978-0-7456-9651-5.
- Do Morals Matter?. New York, NY: Oxford University Press. 2020. ISBN 978-0-19-093596-2.
- Soft Power and Great-Power Competition: Shifting Sands in the Balance of Power Between the United States and China. China and Globalization. Singapore: Springer Nature Singapore. 2023. doi:10.1007/978-981-99-0714-4. ISBN 978-981-99-0713-7.
- A Life in the American Century. John Wiley & Sons. December 19, 2023. ISBN 978-1-5095-6069-1.

=== Selected articles and essays ===
- Nye, Joseph S. (1967). "Corruption and Political Development: A Cost-Benefit Analysis". American Political Science Review. 61 (2). Cambridge University Press: 417–427. doi:10.2307/1953254. JSTOR 1953254.
- Nye, Joseph S.; Keohane, Robert O. (1973). "Power and interdependence". Survival. Global Politics and Strategy. 15 (4). International Institute for Strategic Studies: 158–165. doi:10.1080/00396337308441409.
- Nye, Joseph S. (1990). "Soft power: The means to success in world politics". Foreign Policy (80): 153–171. doi:10.2307/1148580. JSTOR 1148580.
- Nye, Joseph S.; Keohane, Robert O. (1998). "Power and interdependence in the information age". Foreign Affairs. 77 (5): 81–94. doi:10.2307/20049052. JSTOR 20049052.
- Nye, Joseph S. (2008). "Public diplomacy and soft power". The Annals of the American Academy of Political and Social Science. 616 (1). American Academy of Political and Social Science: 94–109. doi:10.1177/0002716207311699.

== See also ==
- Globalism
- Kindleberger Trap

Government offices
Preceded by Fritz Ermarth	Chair of the National Intelligence Council; 1993–1994	Succeeded by Christine Williams
Political offices
Preceded by Chas Freeman	Assistant Secretary of Defense for International Security Affairs; 1994–1995	Succeeded by Franklin Kramer
