= ICS Africa =

ICS SP
- Founded: 1980
- Type: Civil Society Organization
- Purpose: African Children, Families and Parenting.
- Location: Westlands between Park Inn by Radisson and KESRA Building, Nairobi
- Region served: Kenya, Tanzania, Uganda (Via Partners), Ethiopia (Via Partners), Malawi (Via Partners), South Africa (Via Partners), Zimbabwe (Via Partners), Africa, Asia
- Key people: Beatrice Ogutu (Regional Program Manager Child Protection, Africa), Polycarp Musonye (Logistic Officer, Africa), Christine Omitto (Project Officer Child Protection Program, Africa), Isaiah Muthui (Communication Assistant, Africa), Caroline Opondo (Project Assistant Child Protection, Africa); Jared Ogeda (Research and Monitoring Officer at Parenting in Africa Network (PAN), ICS Africa)
- Employees: 15
- Website: www.icsafrica.org
- Formerly called: International Christian Support fund (1980–2003); International Child Support (2004–2010)

ICS SP is a civil society organization. ICS Africa was founded in 1980 and aimed to ensure the safety and wellbeing of all children in Africa. They moved their headquarters to Nunspeet in 2004, while renaming from "International Christian Support Fund" to "International Child Support". The word 'Christian' implied that ICS only supported Christians, conflicting with ICS' goal of supporting underprivileged people regardless of belief. They changed their logo and name to "Investing in Children and their Societies" (ICS SP) in 2011.

== Projects ==
1. Nafics - Nafics Ltd is a maize trading company in Kenya. It aims to turn a profit while supporting the Western Kenyan maize supply chain, specifically in Busia and Kakamega.
2. Skillful Parenting Project (Africa) - ICS SP works with parents with the aim of preventing child abuse, neglect, and family disintegration.
3. Agribusiness (Kenya) - ICS SP provides farm inputs on the condition of reforms to ensure timely planting, use of modern farming technologies, and increased harvest. The agribusiness project is part of the ISEC (Investing in Social and Economic Change) program in Western Kenya, which aims to improve income and food security for households.
4. Agribusiness (Tanzania) - ICS implements a similar agribusiness program in Meatu, Tanzania to boost cereal and sunflower production.
5. Young Entrepreneurs Program (Y.E.P.) - ICS SP intends promotes self-employment in Meatu, Tanzania through an ICS Academy, training youth in agriculture, ICT, or mechanics, as well as providing entrepreneurship development programs.
6. Water Project - ICS SP aims to combat severe water scarcity in Meatu, Tanzania.

== ICS SP Nairobi ==
The ICS SP Headquarters are located at Westland, between Park Inn by Radisson and KESRA Building in Nairobi, Kenya.
