= Kindleberger trap =

Theory of superpower behavior

The Kindleberger trap foresees the danger that a predominant superpower begins to lose the power to exercise overwhelming control over lesser, if nominally independent sovereign states.

- The trap opens as a rival superpower seeks to deploy military, political and economic tactics to secure strategic advantage by offering incentives or outright coercion.
- The trap closes when the challenged authority reacts quickly with tactical violence that is expensive and tends only to accelerates the demise rather than joining in just combat with its own long-term strategy to combat the strategy of the challenger.

The mechanism of the trap lies in the short-term nature of political power versus the strategic planning, and preparation necessary to maintain the credibility of overwhelming military force, enduring political ideology or a unique selling proposition that balances the client's desired quality against price and availability. Thus allowing a potential superpower an opportunity to offer a credible alternative in one or more such areas.

== Background ==
The American economist Charles P. Kindleberger helped devise the Marshall Plan which proposed that the United States could create an American Century after World War II by promoting representative democracy to replace the preceding century of dominance by European colonial powers. The Kindleberger trap was first enunciated about 2017 in a synopsis by soft power professor Joseph Nye which summarized the life works of two prolific Cold War writers Charles P. Kindleburger (1910–2003, professor at MIT) and former President of the United States Dwight D. Eisenhower (1890–1961), each of whom authored some 30 books most of which broadly addressed financial and political ethics.

Eisenhower made several notable speeches on the topic (17 January 1961, reiterated 1962) in which he appears to have been aware of the Kindleberger trap when he noted that the basic purposes of politics was to keep the peace and foster progress in enhancing the liberty and dignity required to secure peaceful international coexistence. The post World War II goals mentioned were probably first enunciated in the Atlantic Charter of 1941 by Franklin Roosevelt and Winston Churchill, later confirmed at Declaration of the Four Nations in Moscow in 1943. These principles were eventually embodied in the establishment of the United Nations as an international organization (San Francisco, 1945).
