= A. F. K. Organski =

Italian and American political scientist

A.F.K. Organski
- Born: 12 May 1923; Rome, Italy
- Died: 6 March 1998 (aged 74)
- Education: New York University
- Known for: Power transition theory
- Scientific career
- Fields: Political Science
- Workplaces: Brooklyn College, University of Michigan
- Notable students: Bruce Bueno de Mesquita, Jacek Kugler, Adam Ruskin

Abramo Fimo Kenneth Organski (12 May 1923 – 6 March 1998) was an Italian and American professor of political science at the University of Michigan, the founder of power transition theory and a co-founder of Decision Insights, Inc. His pioneering work spanned several decades, and focused on specific aspects of world politics, including: political demography; political development; and grand strategy. He was the author of World Politics, The Stages of Political Development, The War Ledger, Birth, Death and Taxes, and The $36 Billion Bargain. Other publications are available in scholarly journals.

A.F.K. Organski was born in Rome, Italy. As a youth, he attended the Ginnasio Liceo Torquato Tasso. He went to the United States, fleeing the anti-Jewish laws of Benito Mussolini's regime, and served with the American armed forces in the Pacific theater from 1943 to 1945. He became an American citizen in 1944. After World War II, he settled in New York City, and earned his B.A. (1947), M.A. (1948), and Ph.D. (1951) degrees from New York University. In 1952, he started teaching at Brooklyn College, moving in 1964 to the University of Michigan, where he became professor of political science and a senior research scientist in the Institute for Social Research. He co-founded Decision Insights, a consulting firm that introduced scientific rigor to the development and execution of policy- and decision-making in government and in business.

He introduced power transition theory in 1958.

Political scientist Bruce Bueno de Mesquita, one of Organski's students, credits Organski's work as the primary inspiration for selectorate theory.
