= Michael Beckley (political scientist) =

American political scientist

- Education: Emory University (BA); Columbia University (PhD)
- Occupation: Political scientist
- Employer(s): Tufts University; Foreign Policy Research Institute; American Enterprise Institute
- Website: www.michaelbeckley.org

Michael Beckley is an American political scientist currently serving as Director of the Asia Program at the Foreign Policy Research Institute, associate professor of political science at Tufts University, and a non-resident senior fellow at the American Enterprise Institute. His research focuses on great-power competition, US-China relations, alliance building, and US defense policy in East Asia.

== Education ==
Beckley received a B.A. in international studies from Emory University and a Ph.D. in political science from Columbia University.

== Publications ==
=== Books ===
- Unrivaled: Why America Will Remain the World’s Sole Superpower (2018)
- Danger Zone: The Coming Conflict with China (2023) (co-authored with Hal Brands)

=== Articles ===
- The Stagnant Order And the End of Rising Powers, Foreign Policy, October 21, 2025
- China's Turn to Fascist Rule, The Globalist, December 6, 2024
- How Primed for War Is China? Foreign Policy, February 4, 2024 (co-authored with Hal Brands)
- Delusions of Détente, Foreign Affairs (August 2023)
- No One Should Want to See a Dictator Get Old, New York Times (August 2023)
