= J. David Singer =

American political scientist (1925–2009)

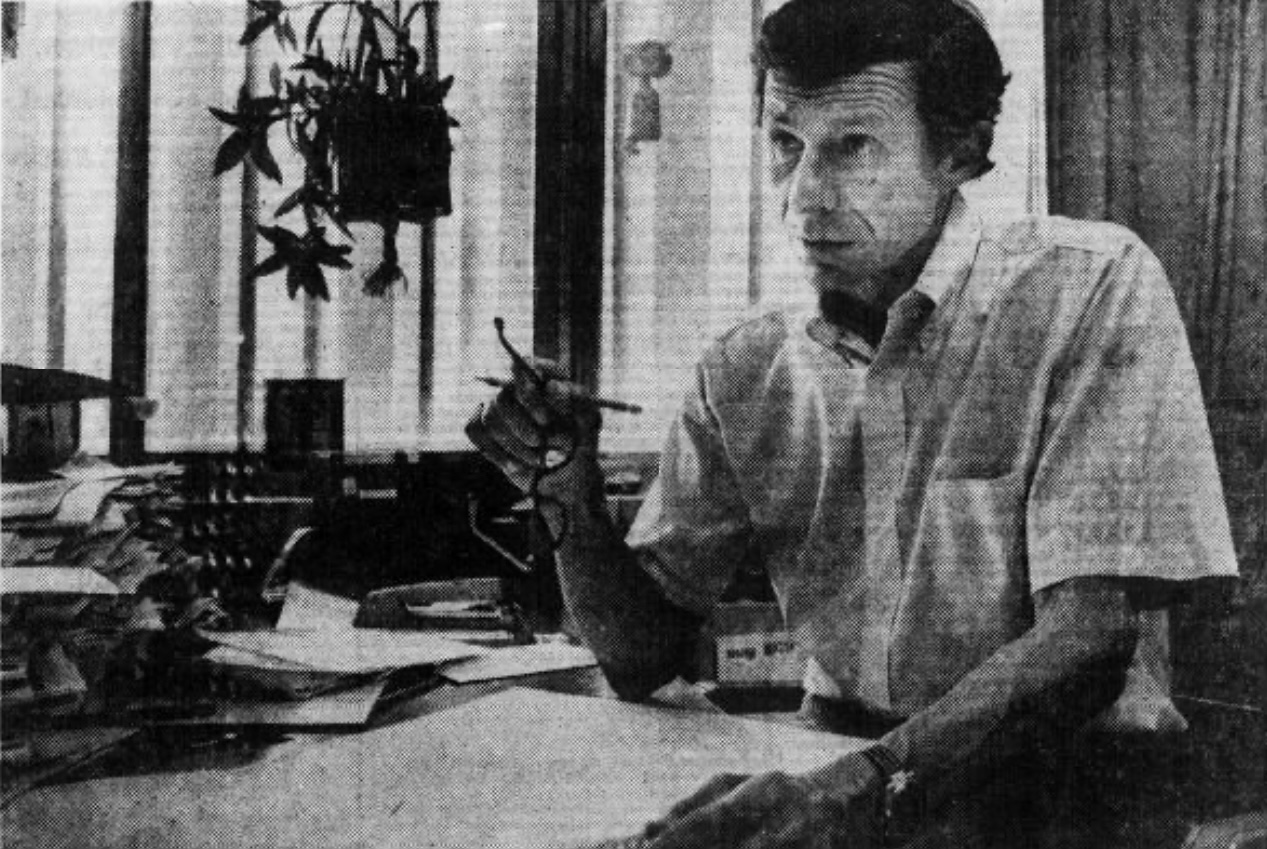
Singer in May 1979

J. David Singer (December 7, 1925, New York City – December 28, 2009, Ann Arbor, Michigan) was an American professor of political science at the University of Michigan. Singer was a pioneer in the application of quantitative methods to hypothesis testing and theory development in the field of international relations. His major contribution was the Correlates of War project, which he began in 1964 at the University of Michigan. It is a major database of statistics relating to war and its causes.

He was born in Brooklyn on December 7, 1925. He served in the U.S. Navy during World War II. He held a bachelor's degree from Duke University and obtained a doctoral degree from New York University in 1956. He was an outspoken opponent of the Vietnam War. He joined the faculty at the University of Michigan in 1958.
