= Peace and Democracy =

Peace and Democracy may refer to:

- Peace and Democracy Party (Turkey), a Turkish political party
- Peace and Democracy Movement, a political party in Northern Cyprus

== See also ==
- Alliance for Peace and Democracy (disambiguation)
- Party for Democracy and Peace, a South Korean political party
- Democratic peace theory, a political theory
- Territorial peace theory, a theory that peace brings democracy
