= Abshir Aden Ferro =

Somalian politician

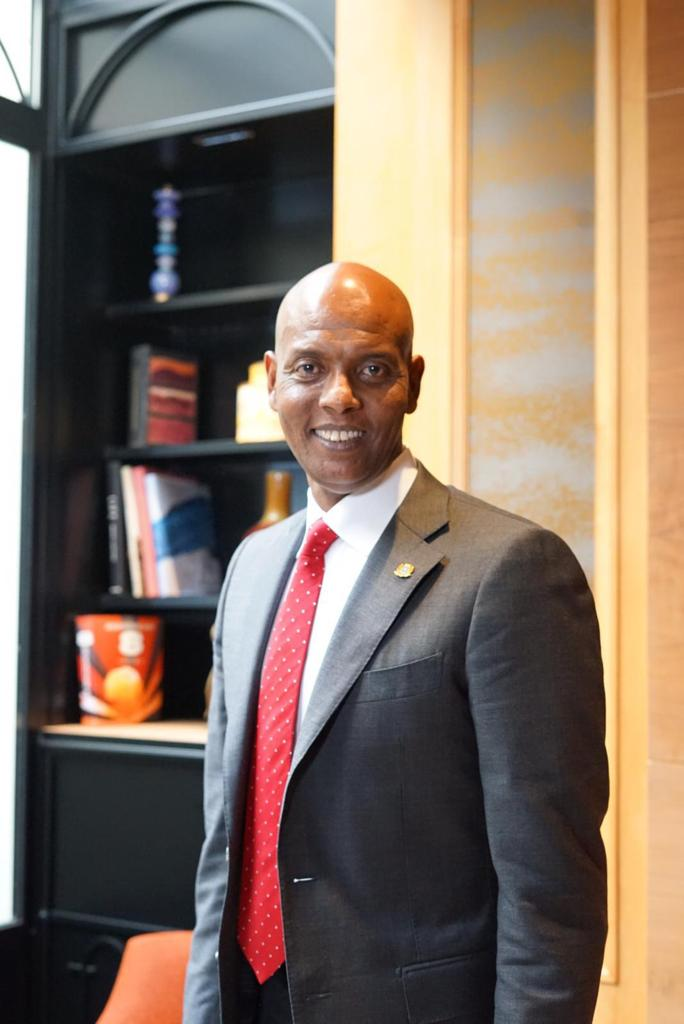
- Born: 1968 (age 57–58); Somalia
- Citizenship: French and Somali
- Occupations: Businessperson and politician
- Known for: Running for President of Somalia
- Political party: Alliance for the Future Party
- Opponent: Al-Shabaab
- Website: https://www.xim.so/

Abshir Aden Ferro is a candidate for the presidential race in Somalia since 2021 and is currently campaigning for the 2026 elections. His political platform is largely focused on establishing democratic elections and preventing the Al-Shabaab militant group from controlling the Somali government. Ferro was born in Somalia in 1968. He moved to France at age twelve, where he became an entrepreneur and started several businesses.

== Early life and education ==
Ferro was born in 1968 in Somalia. His father was a former Somali deputy. Ferro is also related to former president Mohammed Siad Barre, model Iman Bowie, and other politicians. As a child, he attended school in Mogadishu and was taught from the Quran. He also studied with nuns from Italy, until he moved to France at age twelve to be with his father and stepmother. He spent a year back in Somali in language studies, before settling in London around age 21 for about 30 years.

== Business and politics ==
While in London, Ferro married and founded an international security company called Fort Roche. He also owns the companies Abshir Advisors and Somsec. At first, he got involved in international politics by collaborating with the British Ministry of Foreign Affairs, the United Nations' anti-piracy efforts, and others. He created the Somalian Alliance for the Future Party in 2019 and ran for the presidency of Somalia under that party in 2021, despite multiple attempts to assassinate him.

Ferro's presidential campaign focuses on universal suffrage, removing the militant group, Al-Shabaab, and reducing corruption in Somalia in the use of international aid and donors. In Somalia, tribal leaders appoint deputies that vote for government appointees. The country has not had universal suffrage since 1969. In 2024, Ferro has been shortlisted amongst the 100 most reputable Africans. In March 2024, Abshir Aden Ferro has been a speaker during Africa Political Outlook, a summit bringing together committed African, European and international experts, diplomats, political and economic decision-makers, with a view to discussing the major governance issues of the African continent. In June 2024, Ferro was amongst the panelists at the third international conference presented by the Centrist Democrat International (CDI) on the theme of democracy in Africa. Abshir has also been vocal against the actions of the Ethiopian Prime Minister Abiy Ahmed, called for unity and patriotism to overcome the challenges faced the people of Somalia., and campaigned for the development of safe migration pathways and stronger international laws to prevent Somalis being exploited by smugglers and militias.

== Personal life ==
Ferro travels frequently between London, Dubai and Mogadishu. He is a dual French and Somali citizen.
