= Democracy in Africa =

Democracy in Africa is measured according to various definitions of democracy by a variety of indexes, such as V-Dem Democracy indices, and Democracy Index by The Economist.

Map of 2026 V-Dem Electoral Democracy Index for Africa: 0.90–1.00 0.80–0.89 0.70–0.79 0.60–0.69 / 0.50–0.59 0.40–0.49 0.30–0.39 0.20–0.29 / 0.10–0.19 0.00–0.09 No data

The top 3 African countries ranked by V-Dem Democracy indices Electoral Democracy metric in 2024 were Cape Verde (not shown on the map), Seychelles (not shown on the map) and South Africa. The Freedom Index ranks states based on the protection of 'political and civil liberties and freedoms' that individuals receive including the freedom to participate in elections. In 2018, the index found that the majority of sub-Saharan African states including but not limited to Sudan, Cameroon and Ethiopia were 'not-free', while several states including but not limited to Namibia, Botswana and Ghana were pronounced 'free'.

== Historical overview ==
Modern studies have identified elements of deliberative democracy in ancient African societies, such as among the Baganda in Uganda, the amaZulu in South Africa, and the Chewa in Malawi, and it has been argued democracy was present among many other societies in the precolonial era.

The integration of democracy in Africa is a topic some academic scholars place to have occurred in fairly recent history, as a result of historical processes like decolonization and the collapse of communism. Doorenspleet and Nijzink (2014) discuss the democratisation processes in African states like Ghana, when governments were democratically elected through party systems, which they present to be a hallmark of gauging democracy. There is a variety of explanations throughout the scholarly discourse on what prompted democratisation in Africa. Adejumobi (2015) articulates that one key indicator of democracy being introduced to Africa was "the introduction of multiparty elections in most African countries during the 1990s", which will be discussed later in this article in the title 'Measures of Democracy'.

Adejumobi is a proponent of the idea that, before the advent of democracy, most post-colonial states were authoritarian due to "internal and external factors" including volatile circumstances socially and economically. According to his account, stark divisions of "ethnicity, religion, class, and region" across African states were a key impediment to the democratic management of a state's affairs, which has since been overcome to an extent, with numerous states being identified as 'free' by Freedom House (2018).

In 2013, Gylfason noted that the fall of communist regimes in Europe led to substantial increases in democratic systems of government, which had the knock on effect of increasing the number of democracies across the African continent. He states that "the number of democracies in Africa rose from four to 17 while the number of autocracies fell down to single digits". The advantages of incorporating a democratic system of government over autocratic regimes include reducing the likelihood of corruption according to Gylfason, who states "democracy tends to hinder corruption and help growth" by promoting education and governance in the public interest.

=== Colonialism ===
According to scholars such as J. R. Hellibrun, colonialism was an important historical factor in shaping the current political landscape of Africa. He suggests that decolonisation and its coercive 'legacy' which involved subjugation "was critical to suppress dissent among colonial subjects". He argues that the often violent nature of colonial states in Africa had the legacy of prompting the use of force by authoritarian states in the continent, or fragmented the possibilities of an organised, democratic state.

Judith Van Allen (2001) is an additional scholar who suggests that colonialism had an important influence in the contemporary political circumstances in Southern Africa. Van Allen states that "countries in the Southern African cone share a colonial history as a labour reserve, an anti-colonial, anti-minority rule history as Frontline States", which she attributes as a fundamental force in regional cooperation and multilateralism, in the establishment of intergovernmental organisations such as the African Union (AU), and the Southern African Development Community (SADC).

== Measures of democracy ==
There are a variety of indices used to measure democracy in the world. The Democracy Index by the Economist categorizes countries into full democracies, flawed democracies, hybrid regimes, or authoritarian regimes. The V-Dem Democracy indices by V-Dem Institute in Sweden distinguishes between electoral, liberal, participatory, deliberative, and egalitarian democracy metrics. The 2026 V-Dem Democracy indices for African countries are shown below:

Country	Democracy Indices		Democracy Component Indices			
Country	Electoral	Liberal	Liberal	Egalitarian	Participatory	Deliberative
Seychelles	0.76	0.68	0.91	0.83	0.32	0.95
Cape Verde	0.74	0.63	0.84	0.72	0.54	0.69
South Africa	0.74	0.63	0.86	0.65	0.56	0.9
Mauritius	0.74	0.64	0.87	0.76	0.59	0.92
Ghana	0.71	0.61	0.86	0.64	0.4	0.82
Botswana	0.66	0.52	0.76	0.69	0.47	0.43
Lesotho	0.66	0.51	0.76	0.72	0.55	0.71
The Gambia	0.64	0.52	0.81	0.67	0.58	0.74
Namibia	0.63	0.52	0.82	0.46	0.47	0.7
Senegal	0.63	0.48	0.74	0.69	0.58	0.89
São Tomé and Príncipe	0.63	0.52	0.82	0.67	0.55	0.6
Liberia	0.6	0.42	0.65	0.59	0.46	0.81
Kenya	0.56	0.45	0.77	0.55	0.52	0.79
Malawi	0.56	0.46	0.82	0.49	0.6	0.84
Nigeria	0.5	0.31	0.54	0.56	0.57	0.63
Zambia	0.5	0.38	0.71	0.44	0.65	0.81
Benin	0.49	0.32	0.59	0.74	0.49	0.53
Sierra Leone	0.47	0.35	0.67	0.65	0.58	0.9
Tunisia	0.4	0.26	0.57	0.73	0.51	0.75
Ivory Coast	0.39	0.23	0.47	0.49	0.57	0.5
Tanzania	0.36	0.3	0.7	0.76	0.56	0.68
Madagascar	0.36	0.19	0.39	0.34	0.47	0.36
Togo	0.35	0.16	0.32	0.56	0.54	0.71
Angola	0.34	0.16	0.34	0.24	0.16	0.37
Mauritania	0.33	0.13	0.25	0.29	0.53	0.56
Democratic Republic of the Congo	0.31	0.12	0.23	0.36	0.49	0.54
Gabon	0.3	0.18	0.43	0.64	0.62	0.58
Comoros	0.29	0.13	0.3	0.58	0.51	0.28
Central African Republic	0.29	0.1	0.21	0.24	0.29	0.29
Mozambique	0.28	0.18	0.45	0.49	0.53	0.44
Zimbabwe	0.27	0.15	0.37	0.33	0.55	0.6
Algeria	0.26	0.13	0.3	0.57	0.2	0.48
Cameroon	0.26	0.11	0.27	0.48	0.2	0.22
Morocco	0.26	0.25	0.72	0.56	0.39	0.81
Ethiopia	0.26	0.1	0.23	0.43	0.32	0.52
Uganda	0.25	0.16	0.44	0.36	0.41	0.65
Guinea-Bissau	0.25	0.1	0.22	0.47	0.33	0.32
Djibouti	0.25	0.12	0.29	0.54	0.37	0.38
Republic of the Congo	0.24	0.12	0.29	0.26	0.53	0.45
Chad	0.24	0.06	0.11	0.18	0.34	0.32
Niger	0.23	0.18	0.51	0.64	0.56	0.77
Libya	0.19	0.1	0.28	0.36	0.24	0.84
Rwanda	0.19	0.09	0.25	0.51	0.39	0.57
Guinea	0.19	0.1	0.27	0.46	0.36	0.27
Egypt	0.19	0.12	0.34	0.31	0.21	0.36
Burundi	0.18	0.06	0.15	0.28	0.44	0.17
Equatorial Guinea	0.17	0.05	0.11	0.33	0.09	0.11
Somalia	0.16	0.13	0.41	0.3	0.29	0.63
Mali	0.16	0.15	0.49	0.56	0.54	0.7
Burkina Faso	0.13	0.1	0.34	0.54	0.34	0.14
South Sudan	0.13	0.06	0.2	0.08	0.14	0.1
Sudan	0.13	0.03	0.09	0.25	0.15	0.04
Eswatini	0.13	0.1	0.32	0.25	0.37	0.2
Eritrea	0.07	0.01	0.02	0.41	0.02	0.08

Freedom House's Freedom of the World index provides a framework that assesses the degree of liberty, which includes freedom to participate in elections, and as stated on the NGO's website, is established upon the moral principles of articles of international law, namely the United Nations Declaration on Human Rights (UDHR) of 1948. The Freedom Index generates a numerical rating for states between 1 and 7, and the "status designation of Free, Partly Free, or Not Free" is reached through evaluating the extent to which "political rights and civil liberties" are enjoyed by citizens and upheld by the state.

Freedom House wrote in 2018, that the state of democracy in the contemporary international system is in a state of "dramatic decline", and states that "dramatic declines in freedom have been observed in every region of the world". Only eleven African states are listed as 'free' under the Freedom Index; Botswana, Mauritius, Cape Verde, Senegal, Tunisia, Ghana, Nigeria, São Tomé and Príncipe, Namibia, South Africa, and Benin.

The NGO's website discusses that the world faces a "crisis of democracy", with 37 per cent of the global population living in circumstances that it finds to be categorically not free. Freedom House marked 2017 as the year that saw the most rapid decline, with "the basic tenets of democracy including guarantees of free and fair elections, the rights of minorities, freedom of the press, and the rule of law" to face serious threats, all of which occurred in African states that are listed as 'partially-free' or 'not free'.

The Fraser Institute and Freedom House both provide a numerical measure of how democracy is implemented in African states. Judith Van Allen (2001) provides an additional measure of democracy, that focuses on the role of social movements and social equality as an indicator of the extent to which liberal democratic freedoms and rights are protected or prevalent in a state. Van Allen articulates this through her case study on women's rights movements in Botswana, a state listed as 'free' by Freedom House. Her discussion of democracy in Africa begins with a statement of the relevance of utilizing such measures, when she posits that academic discourse on democracy in Africa tends to "focus on conflicts between male elites". She suggests that the importance of women's rights movements to the stability of democracy in Botswana is an interconnection under-addressed throughout the academic scholarship and political discourse, and states that it bears a fundamental "significance for Botswana's present and potential future democratic political life of these successes and the resulting position of women in society and policy".

Van Allen presents that women's rights movements in Botswana were coincided by similar efforts in states like "Mozambique, Angola, Zimbabwe, Namibia, and South Africa", where many Marxist oriented activism "recruited women on the basis of their commitment to women's emancipation". She states that such developments, particularly in Botswana, have been central yet often un-identified aspects that have facilitated its liberalized economy and robust public service network.

== Democratisation in Africa ==
The correlation between democratisation and globalisation has been discussed extensively by scholars like Nicola Pratt, who present the argument that the relationship between globalisation and African states democratising is complex, as it bears both advantages and disadvantages. As outlined by Pratt, the discourse surrounding the link between democratisation and globalisation typically aligns with a 'pro-globalisation' or 'anti-globalisation' stance. Proponents of a pro-globalisation stance are often advocates for free trade and market liberalisation, who suggest such economic processes advance prospects of economic freedom, and thus democracy in a broader context. Yet, anti-globalisation theorists often denounce these defining features of economic globalisation according to Pratt, and instead suggest that aiming to incorporate such economic processes into newly democratised states in continents like Africa is premature, and increases circumstances of volatility.

== Current systems of governance ==
The contemporary systems of governance across the African continent are diverse. Therefore, when discussing a topic as broad as democracy in Africa, it is important to consider individual states as the key unit of analysis, which indices of Freedom in the world have modelled. The NGO Freedom House classifies the systems of governance in Africa to encompass democratic, autocratic, and 'hybrid regimes'. Through imploring the various indices used to measure democracy, political commentators, NGOs and academics suggest it to be evident that the current systems of governance incorporate elements of democracy, however may need to commit further systematic and institutional change to be classified 'democratic', hence the category of 'hybrid regimes'. 'Hybrid regimes' is a term in the Democracy Index from the Economist Intelligence Unit (EIU) in the UK to examine states that have both authoritarian and democratic institutions and patterns of governing and organising its central political and economic processes.

Nyeck discusses systems of governance in Africa, and emphasises Public Procurement Reform as a means of understanding current trends in central governance. He cites Schapper and Malta (2012:1) who state that "procurement is a vital component of a country's public administration that links the financial systems with economic and social outcomes. This makes public procurement systems a critical element to good governance". In other words, how a state uses its budget across public services is an important element in measuring the rights and entitlements of its citizens, which Nyeck discusses in relation to Botswana. He suggests that health and education are supported adequately by the state, although there are certain challenges in relation to the dispensary of medicines.

The V-Dem Democracy Report identified for the year 2023 stand-alone democratization in The Gambia and Seychelles and U-Turn democratization in Zambia, Benin, and Lesotho.

== By country ==
- Democracy in Senegal
- Sudanese transition to democracy (2019–2021)

== See also ==
- Democratic peace theory
- Territorial peace theory
- Democracy in the Americas
- Democracy in Asia
- Democracy in Europe
- Democracy in the Middle East and North Africa
