= Dean Babst =

American sociologist

Dean Voris Babst (1921 – 3 September 2006) was an American sociologist, who wrote the first academic paper arguing that democracies do not fight among themselves. He also became staff scientist for the New York State Narcotic Addiction Control Commission, and wrote several books on the subject.

== Democratic peace theory ==
Babst published the first scholarly paper in the present field of democratic peace theory in Wisconsin Sociologist in 1964. He also published a slightly popularized version in an industrial trade journal ("A Force for Peace", Industrial Research, April 1972). In the article, Babst suggests that the existence of independent nations with elective governments greatly increases the chance for the maintenance of peace. As an example, he uses France and Great Britain, which fought multiple wars before acquiring a freely elected government.
