= Alliance for Peace and Democracy =

Alliance for Peace and Democracy may refer to:

- Alliance for Peace and Democracy (Hong Kong), a political group in Hong Kong
- Alliance for Peace and Democracy (Liberia), between the Liberian People's Party and United People's Party
