= Democratic peace theory =

International relations theory

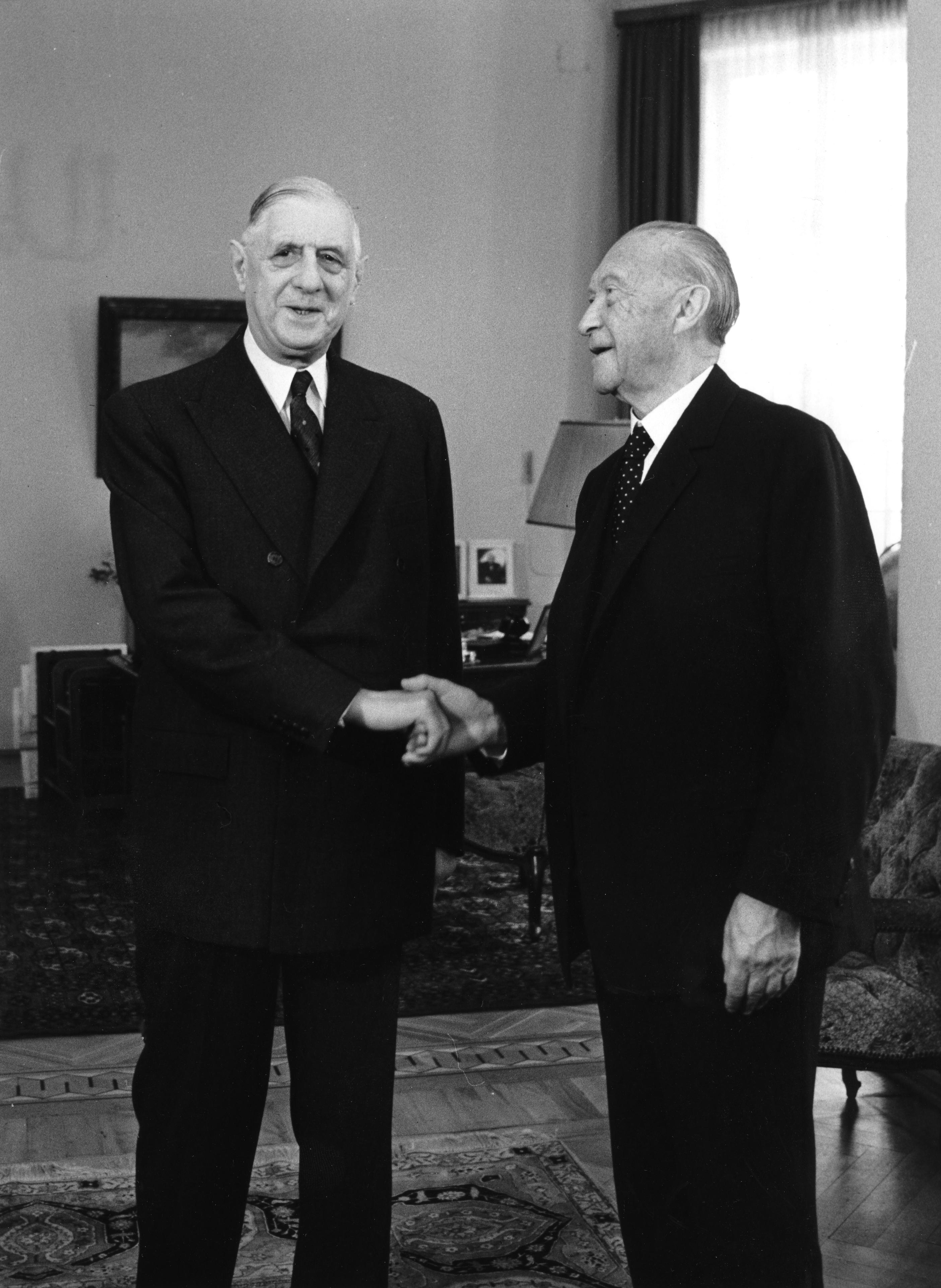
French President Charles de Gaulle shaking hands with West German Chancellor Konrad Adenauer in Bonn, in 1963

Proponents of democratic peace theory argue that electoral democracies are hesitant to engage in armed conflict with other identified democracies. Different advocates of this theory suggest that several factors are responsible for motivating peace between democratic states. Individual theorists maintain "monadic" forms of this theory (democracies are in general more peaceful in their international relations); "dyadic" forms of this theory (democracies do not go to war with other democracies); and "systemic" forms of this theory (more democratic states in the international system makes the international system more peaceful).

In terms of norms and identities, it is hypothesized that democracies are more dovish in their interactions with other democracies, and that democratically elected leaders are more likely to resort to peaceful resolution in disputes (both in domestic politics and international politics). In terms of structural or institutional constraints, it is hypothesized that institutional checks and balances, accountability of leaders to the public, and larger winning coalitions make it harder for democratic leaders to go to war unless there are clearly favorable ratio of benefits to costs.

These structural constraints, along with the transparent nature of democratic politics, make it harder for democratic leaders to mobilize for war and initiate surprise attacks, which reduces fear and inadvertent escalation to war. The transparent nature of democratic political systems, as well as deliberative debates (involving opposition parties, the media, experts, and bureaucrats), make it easier for democratic states to credibly signal their intentions. The concept of audience costs entails that threats issued by democratic leaders are taken more seriously because democratic leaders will be electorally punished by their citizens from backing down from threats, which reduces the risk of misperception and miscalculation by states.

The connection between peace and democracy has long been recognized, but theorists disagree about the direction of causality. The democratic peace theory posits that democracy causes peace, while the territorial peace theory makes the opposite claim that peace causes democracy. Other theories argue that omitted variables explain the correlation better than democratic peace theory. Alternative explanations for the correlation of peace among democracies include arguments revolving around institutions, commerce, interdependence, alliances, US world dominance and political stability. There are instances in the historical record that serve as exceptions to the democratic peace theory.

== History ==
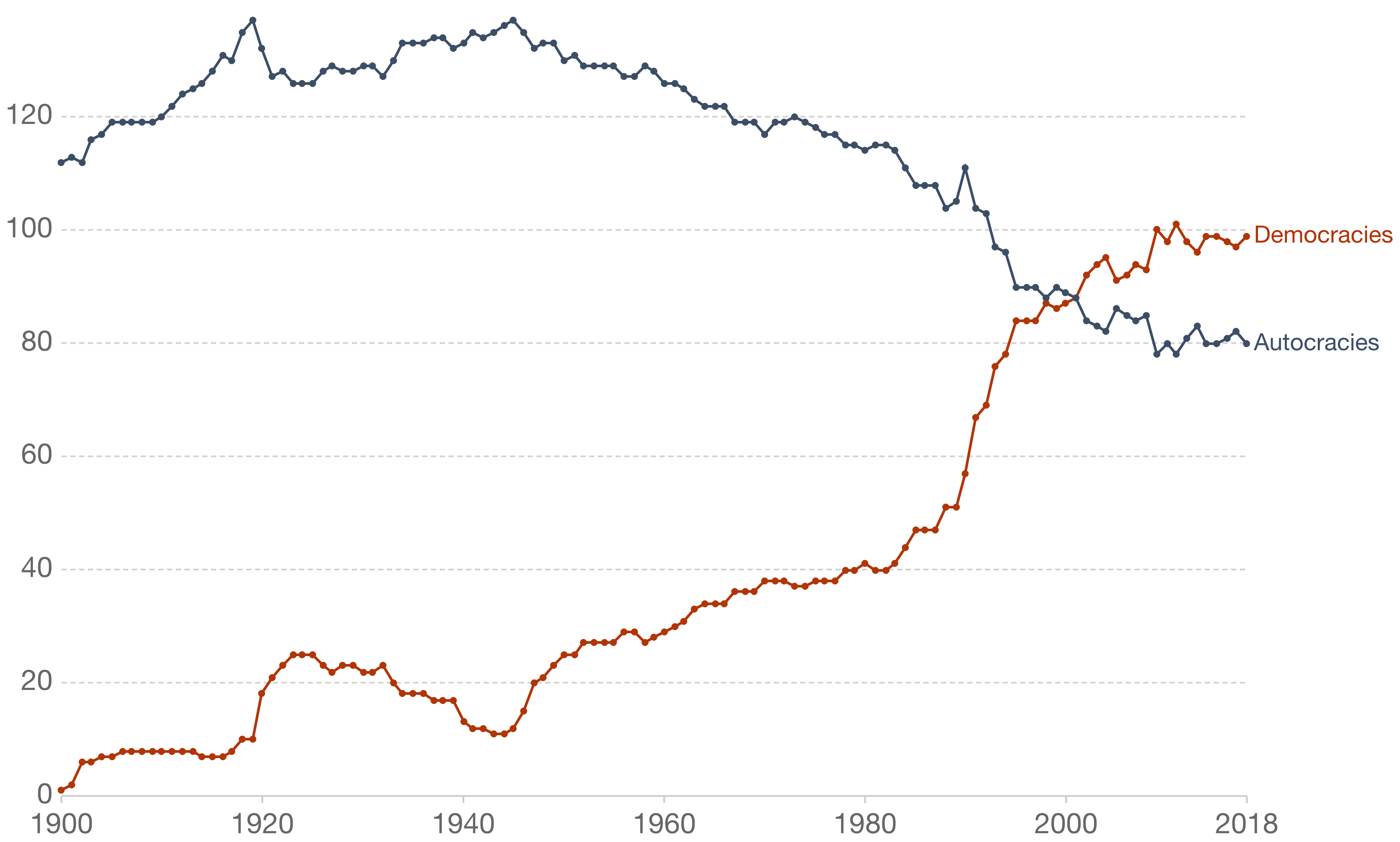
Democracies Autocracies

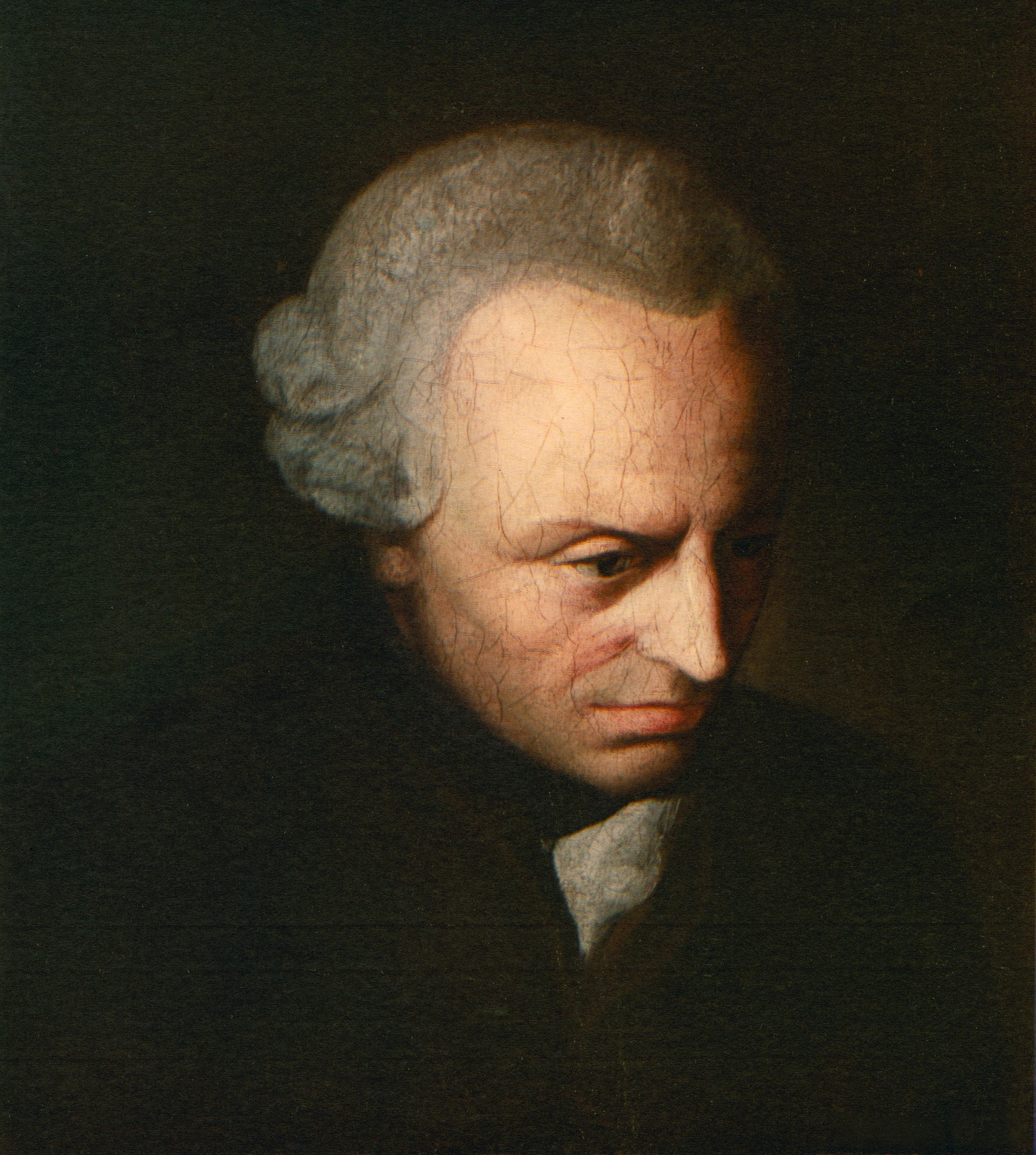
German philosopher Immanuel Kant, c. 1790

Though the democratic peace theory was not rigorously or scientifically studied until the 1960s, the basic principles of the concept had been argued as early as the 18th century in the works of philosopher Immanuel Kant and political theorist Thomas Paine. Kant foreshadowed the theory in his essay Perpetual Peace: A Philosophical Sketch written in 1795, although he thought that a world with only constitutional republics was only one of several necessary conditions for a perpetual peace. In earlier but less cited works, Thomas Paine made similar or stronger claims about the peaceful nature of republics. Paine wrote in "Common Sense" in 1776: "The Republics of Europe are all (and we may say always) in peace." Paine argued that kings would go to war out of pride in situations where republics would not. French historian and social scientist Alexis de Tocqueville also argued, in Democracy in America (1835–1840), that democratic nations were less likely to wage war. (Note: "When the principle of equality spreads, as in Europe now, not only within one nation, but at the same time among several neighboring peoples, the inhabitants of these various countries, despite different languages, customs, and laws, always resemble each other in an equal fear of war and love of peace. In vain do ambitious or angry princes arm for war; in spite of themselves, they are calmed down by some sort of general apathy and goodwill which makes the sword fall from their hands. Wars become rarer.") Herbert Spencer also argued for a relationship between democracy and peace. At the Geneva Congress of the League of Peace and Freedom in 1867, Giuseppe Garibaldi declared that "democracy alone can provide a guarantee against the evils of war".

Dean Babst, a criminologist, was the first to do statistical research on this topic. His academic paper supporting the theory was published in 1964 in Wisconsin Sociologist; he published a slightly more popularized version, in 1972, in the trade journal Industrial Research. Both versions initially received little attention.

Melvin Small and J. David Singer responded; they found an absence of wars between democratic states with two "marginal exceptions", but denied that this pattern had statistical significance. This paper was published in the Jerusalem Journal of International Relations which finally brought more widespread attention to the theory, and started the academic debate. A 1983 paper by political scientist Michael W. Doyle contributed further to popularizing the theory.

Maoz and Abdolali extended the research to lesser conflicts than wars. Bremer, Maoz and Russett found the correlation between democracy and peacefulness remained significant after controlling for many possible confounding variables. This moved the theory into the mainstream of social science. Supporters of realism in international relations and others responded by raising many new objections. Other researchers attempted more systematic explanations of how democracy might cause peace, and of how democracy might also affect other aspects of foreign relations such as alliances and collaboration.

There have been numerous further studies in the field since these pioneering works. (Note: See Rummel, who is partisan, and the bibliography lacks some recent papers, but is nonetheless one of the better introductions to the subject.) Most studies have found some form of democratic peace exists, although neither methodological disputes nor doubtful cases are entirely resolved.

== Definitions ==
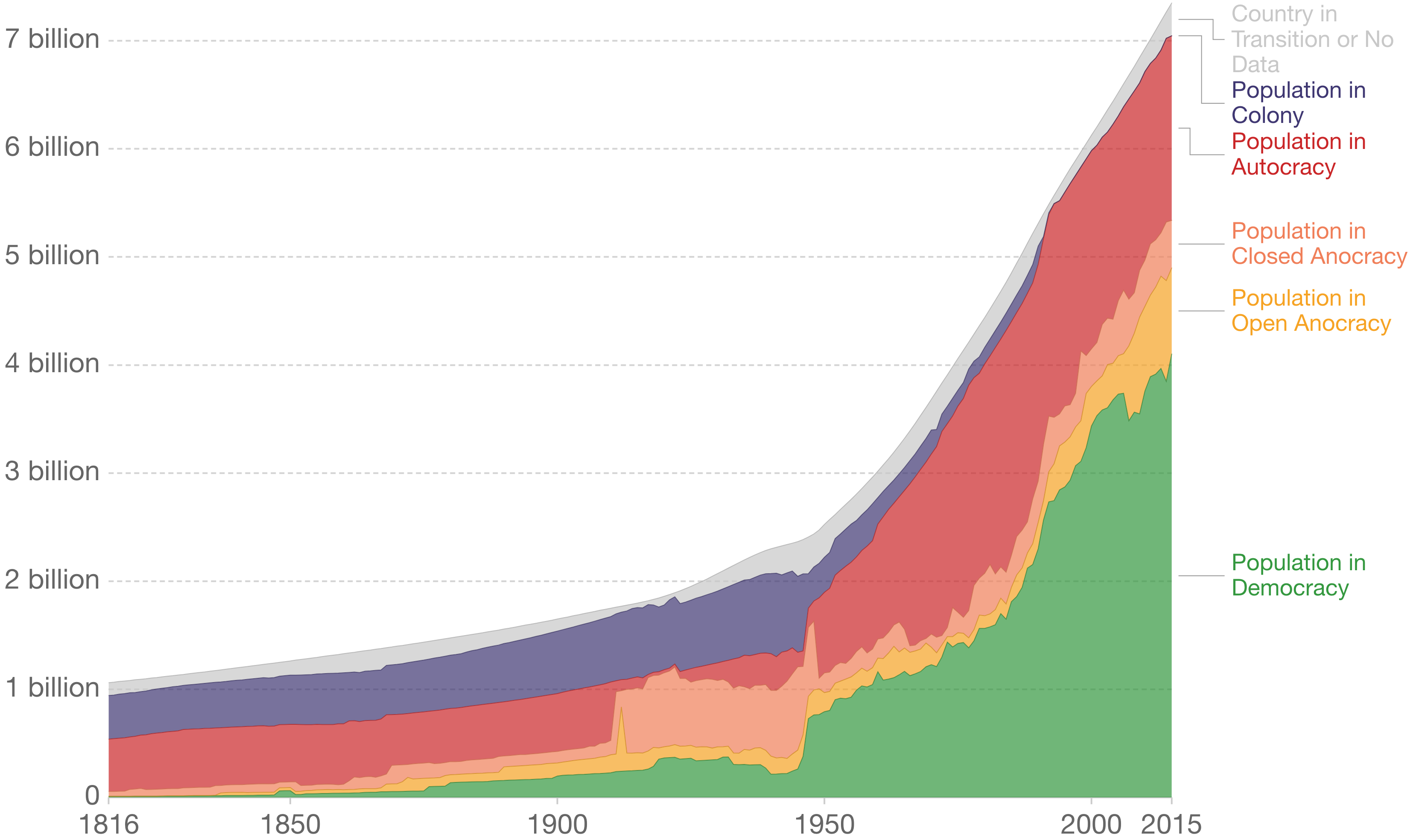
World population by political regime type

Research on the democratic peace theory has to define "democracy" and "peace" (or, more often, "war").

=== Defining democracy ===
Democracies have been defined differently by different theorists and researchers; this accounts for some of the variations in their findings. Some examples:

Small and Singer define democracy as a nation that (1) holds periodic elections in which the opposition parties are as free to run as government parties, (2) allows at least 10% of the adult population to vote, and (3) has a parliament that either controls or enjoys parity with the executive branch of the government.

Doyle requires (1) that "liberal regimes" have market or private property economics, (2) they have policies that are internally sovereign, (3) they have citizens with juridical rights, and (4) they have representative governments. Either 30% of the adult males were able to vote or it was possible for every man to acquire voting rights as by attaining enough property. He allows greater power to hereditary monarchs than other researchers; for example, he counts the rule of Louis-Philippe of France as a liberal regime.

Ray requires that at least 50% of the adult population is allowed to vote and that there has been at least one peaceful, constitutional transfer of executive power from one independent political party to another by means of an election. This definition excludes long periods often viewed as democratic. For example, the United States until 1800, India from independence until 1979, and Japan until 1993 were all under a dominant-party system, and thus would not be counted under this definition.

Rummel states that "By democracy is meant liberal democracy, where those who hold power are elected in competitive elections with a secret ballot and wide franchise (loosely understood as including at least 2/3 of adult males); where there is freedom of speech, religion, and organization; and a constitutional framework of law to which the government is subordinate and that guarantees equal rights."

==== Non-binary classifications ====
The above definitions are binary, classifying nations into either democracies or non-democracies. Many researchers have instead used more finely grained scales. One example is the Polity data series which scores each state on two scales, one for democracy and one for autocracy, for each year since 1800; as well as several others. (Note: Other such rankings have made by Steve Chan and by Ze'ev Maoz. See also SIPRI and Peter D. Watson Center for Conflict and Cooperation.) The use of the Polity Data has varied. Some researchers have done correlations between the democracy scale and belligerence; others have treated it as a binary classification by (as its maker does) calling all states with a high democracy score and a low autocracy score democracies; yet others have used the difference of the two scores, sometimes again making this into a binary classification.

==== Young democracies ====
Several researchers have observed that many of the possible exceptions to the democratic peace have occurred when at least one of the involved democracies was very young. Many of them have therefore added a qualifier, typically stating that the peacefulness apply to democracies older than three years. Rummel argues that this is enough time for "democratic procedures to be accepted, and democratic culture to settle in." Additionally, this may allow for other states to actually come to the recognition of the state as a democracy.

Mansfield and Snyder, while agreeing that there have been no wars between mature liberal democracies, state that countries in transition to democracy are especially likely to be involved in wars. They find that democratizing countries are even more warlike than stable democracies, stable autocracies or even countries in transition towards autocracy. So, they suggest caution in eliminating these wars from the analysis, because this might hide a negative aspect of the process of democratization. A reanalysis of the earlier study's statistical results emphasizes that the above relationship between democratization and war can only be said to hold for those democratizing countries where the executive lacks sufficient power, independence, and institutional strength. A review cites several other studies finding that the increase in the risk of war in democratizing countries happens only if many or most of the surrounding nations are undemocratic. If wars between young democracies are included in the analysis, several studies and reviews still find enough evidence supporting the stronger claim that all democracies, whether young or established, go into war with one another less frequently; while some do not.

=== Defining war ===
Quantitative research on international wars usually defines war as a military conflict with more than 1000 killed in battle in one year. This is the definition used in the Correlates of War Project which has also supplied the data for many studies on war. It turns out that most of the military conflicts in question fall clearly above or below this threshold.

Some researchers have used different definitions. For example, Weart defines war as more than 200 battle deaths. Russett, when looking at Ancient Greece, only requires some real battle engagement, involving on both sides forces under state authorization.

Militarized Interstate Disputes (MIDs), in the Correlates of War Project classification, are lesser conflicts than wars. Such a conflict may be no more than military display of force with no battle deaths. MIDs and wars together are "militarized interstate conflicts" or MICs. MIDs include the conflicts that precede a war; the difference between MIDs and MICs may thus be less than it appears, though this remains an area of investigation.

Statistical analysis and concerns about degrees of freedom are the primary reasons for using MID's instead of actual wars. Wars are relatively rare. An average ratio of 30 MIDs to one war provides a richer statistical environment for analysis.

=== Monadic vs. dyadic peace ===
Most research is regarding the dyadic peace, that democracies do not fight one another. Very few researchers have supported the monadic peace, that democracies are more peaceful in general. There are some recent papers that find a slight monadic effect. Müller and Wolff, in listing them, agree "that democracies on average might be slightly, but not strongly, less warlike than other states," but general "monadic explanations are neither necessary nor convincing." They note that democracies have varied greatly in their belligerence against non-democracies.

== Exceptions ==
Some scholars support the democratic peace on probabilistic grounds: since many wars have been fought since democracies first arose, we might expect a proportionate number of wars to have occurred between democracies, if democracies fought each other as freely as other pairs of states; but proponents of democratic peace theory claim that the number is much less than might be expected. However, opponents of the theory argue this is mistaken and claim there are numerous examples of wars between democracies.

Historically, troublesome cases for the democratic peace theory include the Sicilian Expedition, the War of 1812, the Mexican-American War, the U.S. Civil War, the Fashoda Crisis, conflicts between Ecuador and Peru, the Cod Wars, the Spanish–American War, and the Kargil War. Not all scholars agree on specific exceptions to the democratic peace theory, if any. Doyle cites the Paquisha War and the Lebanese air force's intervention in the Six-Day War. The total number of cases suggested in the literature is at least 50. The data set Bremer was using showed one exception, the French-Thai War of 1940; Gleditsch sees the state of war between Finland and United Kingdom during World War II, as a special case, which should probably be treated separately: an incidental state of war between democracies during large and complex war with hundreds of belligerents and the constant shifting of geopolitical and diplomatic boundaries. However, the British did conduct a few military actions of minor scope against the Finns, more to demonstrate their alliance with the Soviets than to actually engage in war with Finland. Page Fortna discusses the 1974 Turkish invasion of Cyprus and the Kargil War as exceptions, finding the latter to be the most significant.

== Conflict initiation ==
According to a 2017 review study, "there is enough evidence to conclude that democracy does cause peace at least between democracies, that the observed correlation between democracy and peace is not spurious".

Most studies have looked only at who is involved in the conflicts and ignored the question of who initiated the conflict. In many conflicts both sides argue that the other side was the initiator. Several researchers have argued that studying conflict initiation is of limited value, because existing data about conflict initiation may be especially unreliable. Even so, several studies have examined this. Reitner and Stam argue that autocracies initiate conflicts against democracies more frequently than democracies do against autocracies. Quackenbush and Rudy, while confirming Reiter and Stam's results, find that democracies initiate wars against non-democracies more frequently than non-democracies do to each other. Several following studies have studied how different types of autocracies with different institutions vary regarding conflict initiation. Personalistic and military dictatorships may be particularly prone to conflict initiation, as compared to other types of autocracy such as one-party states, but also more likely to be targeted in a war having other initiators.

One 2017 study found that democracies are no more likely to settle border disputes peacefully than non-democracies.

== Internal violence and genocide ==
As well as improved releations between states, there is also evidence that democracies have less internal systematic violence. For instance, one study finds that the most democratic and the most authoritarian states have few civil wars, and intermediate regimes the most. The probability for a civil war is also increased by political change, regardless whether toward greater democracy or greater autocracy. Intermediate regimes continue to be the most prone to civil war, regardless of the time since the political change. In the long run, since intermediate regimes are less stable than autocracies, which in turn are less stable than democracies, durable democracy is the most probable end-point of the process of democratization. Abadie's study finds that the most democratic nations have the least terrorism. Harff finds that genocide and politicide are rare in democracies. Rummel finds that the more democratic a regime, the less its democide. He finds that democide has killed six times as many people as battles.

Davenport and Armstrong II list several other studies and states: "Repeatedly, democratic political systems have been found to decrease political bans, censorship, torture, disappearances and mass killing, doing so in a linear fashion across diverse measurements, methodologies, time periods, countries, and contexts." It concludes: "Across measures and methodological techniques, it is found that below a certain level, democracy has no impact on human rights violations, but above this level democracy influences repression in a negative and roughly linear manner." They also state that thirty years worth of statistical research has revealed that only two variables decrease human rights violations: political democracy and economic development.

Abulof and Goldman add a caveat, focusing on the contemporary Middle East and North Africa (MENA). Statistically, a MENA democracy makes a country more prone to both the onset and incidence of civil war, and the more democratic a MENA state is, the more likely it is to experience violent intrastate strife. Moreover, anocracies do not seem to be predisposed to civil war, either worldwide or in MENA. Looking for causality beyond correlation, they suggest that democracy's pacifying effect is partly mediated through societal subscription to self-determination and popular sovereignty. This may turn "democratizing nationalism" to a long-term prerequisite, not just an immediate hindrance, to peace and democracy.

== Explanations ==
These theories have traditionally been categorized into two groups: explanations that focus on democratic norms and explanations that focus on democratic political structures. They usually are meant to be explanations for little violence between democracies, not for a low level of internal violence in democracies.

Several of these mechanisms may also apply to countries of similar systems. The book Never at War finds evidence that the oligarchic republics common in ancient Greece and medieval and early modern Europe hardly ever made war on one another. One example is the Polish–Lithuanian Commonwealth, in which the Sejm resisted and vetoed most royal proposals for war, like those of Władysław IV Vasa.

A study by V-Dem Institute found both interbranch constraint on the executive and civil society activism as the mechanism for democratic peace but found accountability provided directly by elections not as crucial.

=== Democratic norms ===
One example from the first group is that liberal democratic culture may make the leaders accustomed to negotiation and compromise. Policy makers who have built their careers within a political culture of non-violent accommodations with domestic rivals, unlike autocrats who typically hold power through the threat of coercion, will be inclined toward non-violent methods abroad. Another that a belief in human rights may make people in democracies reluctant to go to war, especially against other democracies. The decline in colonialism, also by democracies, may be related to a change in perception of non-European peoples and their rights.

Bruce Russett also argues that the democratic culture affects the way leaders resolve conflicts. In addition, he holds that a social norm emerged toward the end of the nineteenth century; that democracies should not fight each other, which strengthened when the democratic culture and the degree of democracy increased, for example by widening the franchise. Increasing democratic stability allowed partners in foreign affairs to perceive a nation as reliably democratic. The alliances between democracies during the two World Wars and the Cold War also strengthened the norms. He sees less effective traces of this norm in Greek antiquity.

Hans Köchler relates the question of transnational democracy to empowering the individual citizen by involving him, through procedures of direct democracy, in a country's international affairs, and he calls for the restructuring of the United Nations Organization according to democratic norms. He refers in particular to the Swiss practice of participatory democracy.

Mousseau argues that it is market-oriented development that creates the norms and values that explain both democracy and the peace. In less developed countries individuals often depend on social networks that impose conformity to in-group norms and beliefs, and loyalty to group leaders. When jobs are plentiful on the market, in contrast, as in market-oriented developed countries, individuals depend on a strong state that enforces contracts equally. Cognitive routines emerge of abiding by state law rather than group leaders, and, as in contracts, tolerating differences among individuals. Voters in marketplace democracies thus accept only impartial 'liberal' governments, and constrain leaders to pursue their interests in securing equal access to global markets and in resisting those who distort such access with force. Marketplace democracies thus share common foreign policy interests in the supremacy—and predictability—of international law over brute power politics, and equal and open global trade over closed trade and imperial preferences. When disputes do originate between marketplace democracies, they are less likely than others to escalate to violence because both states, even the stronger one, perceive greater long-term interests in the supremacy of law over power politics.

Braumoeller argues that liberal norms of conflict resolution vary because liberalism takes many forms. By examining survey results from the newly independent states of the former Soviet Union, the author demonstrates that liberalism in that region bears a stronger resemblance to 19th-century liberal nationalism than to the sort of universalist, Wilsonian liberalism described by democratic peace theorists, and that, as a result, liberals in the region are more, not less, aggressive than non-liberals.

A 2013 study by Jessica Weeks and Michael Tomz found through survey experiments that the public was less supportive of war in cases involving fellow democracies.

=== Democratic political structures ===
The case for institutional constraints goes back to Immanuel Kant, who wrote:

[I]f the consent of the citizens is required in order to decide that war should be declared (and in this constitution it cannot but be the case), nothing is more natural than that they would be very cautious in commencing such a poor game, decreeing for themselves all the calamities of war. Among the latter would be: having to fight, having to pay the costs of war from their own resources, having painfully to repair the devastation war leaves behind, and, to fill up the measure of evils, load themselves with a heavy national debt that would embitter peace itself and that can never be liquidated on account of constant wars in the future.

Democracy thus gives influence to those most likely to be killed or wounded in wars, and their relatives and friends (and to those who pay the bulk of the war taxes.) This monadic theory must, however, explain why democracies do attack non-democratic states. One explanation is that these democracies were threatened or otherwise were provoked by the non-democratic states. Doyle argued that the absence of a monadic peace is only to be expected: the same ideologies that cause liberal states to be at peace with each other inspire idealistic wars with the illiberal, whether to defend oppressed foreign minorities or avenge countrymen settled abroad. Doyle also notes liberal states do conduct covert operations against each other; the covert nature of the operation, however, prevents the publicity otherwise characteristic of a free state from applying to the question.

Charles Lipson argues that four factors common in democracies give them a "contracting advantage" that leads to a dyadic democratic peace: (1) Greater transparency, (2) Greater continuity, (3) Electoral incentives for leaders to keep promises, and (4) Constitutional governance.

Studies show that democratic states are more likely than autocratic states to win the wars that they start. One explanation is that democracies, for internal political and economic reasons, have greater resources. This might mean that democratic leaders are unlikely to select other democratic states as targets because they perceive them to be particularly formidable opponents. One study finds that interstate wars have important impacts on the fate of political regimes, and that the probability that a political leader will fall from power in the wake of a lost war is particularly high in democratic states.

As described by Gelpi and Griesdorf, several studies have argued that liberal leaders face institutionalized constraints that impede their capacity to mobilize the state's resources for war without the consent of a broad spectrum of interests. Survey results that compare the attitudes of citizens and elites in the Soviet successor states are consistent with this argument. Moreover, these constraints are readily apparent to other states and cannot be manipulated by leaders. Thus, democracies send credible signals to other states of an aversion to using force. These signals allow democratic states to avoid conflicts with one another, but they may attract aggression from non-democratic states. Democracies may be pressured to respond to such aggression—perhaps even preemptively—through the use of force. Also as described by Gelpi and Griesdorf, studies have argued that when democratic leaders do choose to escalate international crises, their threats are taken as highly credible, since there must be a relatively large public opinion for these actions. In disputes between liberal states, the credibility of their bargaining signals allows them to negotiate a peaceful settlement before mobilization. A 2017 study by Jeff Carter found evidence that democratic states are slower to mobilize for war.

An explanation based on game theory similar to the last two above is that the participation of the public and the open debate send clear and reliable information regarding the intentions of democracies to other states. In contrast, it is difficult to know the intentions of non-democratic leaders, what effect concessions will have, and if promises will be kept. Thus there will be mistrust and unwillingness to make concessions if at least one of the parties in a dispute is a non-democracy.

The risk factors for certain types of state have, however, changed since Kant's time. In the quote above, Kant points to the lack of popular support for war – first that the populace will directly or indirectly suffer in the event of war – as a reason why republics will not tend to go to war. The number of American troops killed or maimed versus the number of Iraqi soldiers and civilians maimed and killed in the American-Iraqi conflict is indicative. This may explain the relatively great willingness of democratic states to attack weak opponents: the Iraq war was, initially at least, highly popular in the United States. The case of the Vietnam War might, nonetheless, indicate a tipping point where publics may no longer accept continuing attrition of their soldiers (even while remaining relatively indifferent to the much higher loss of life on the part of the populations attacked).

Coleman uses economic cost-benefit analysis to reach conclusions similar to Kant's. Coleman examines the polar cases of autocracy and liberal democracy. In both cases, the costs of war are assumed to be borne by the people. In autocracy, the autocrat receives the entire benefits of war, while in a liberal democracy the benefits are dispersed among the people. Since the net benefit to an autocrat exceeds the net benefit to a citizen of a liberal democracy, the autocrat is more likely to go to war. The disparity of benefits and costs can be so high that an autocrat can launch a welfare-destroying war when his net benefit exceeds the total cost of war. Contrarily, the net benefit of the same war to an individual in a liberal democracy can be negative so that he would not choose to go to war. This disincentive to war is increased between liberal democracies through their establishment of linkages, political and economic, that further raise the costs of war between them. Therefore, liberal democracies are less likely to go war, especially against each other. Coleman further distinguishes between offensive and defensive wars and finds that liberal democracies are less likely to fight defensive wars that may have already begun due to excessive discounting of future costs.

Brad LeVeck and Neil Narang argue that democratic states are less likely to produce decision-making errors in crises due to a larger and more diverse set of actors who are involved in the foreign policy decision-making process.

Using selectorate theory, Bruce Bueno de Mesquita, James D. Morrow, Randolph M. Siverson and Alastair Smith argue that the democratic peace stems in part from the fact that democratic leaders sustain their power through large winning coalitions, which means that democratic leaders devote more resources to war, have an advantage in war, and choose wars that they are highly likely to win. Median citizens of two countries tend to prefer nonviolent conflict resolution.

=== Audience costs ===
A prominent rational choice argument for the democratic peace is that democracies carry greater audience costs than authoritarian states, which makes them better at signaling their intentions in interstate disputes. Arguments regarding the credibility of democratic states in disputes has been subject to debate among international relations scholars. Two studies from 2001, using the MID and ICB datasets, provided empirical support for the notion that democracies were more likely to issue effective threats. However, a 2012 study by Alexander B. Downes and Todd S. Sechser found that existing datasets were not suitable to draw any conclusions as to whether democratic states issued more effective threats. They constructed their own dataset specifically for interstate military threats and outcomes, which found no relationship between regime type and effective threats. A 2017 study which recoded flaws in the MID dataset ultimately conclude, "that there are no regime-based differences in dispute reciprocation, and prior findings may be based largely on poorly coded data." Other scholars have disputed the democratic credibility argument, questioning its causal logic and empirical validity. Research by Jessica Weeks argued that some authoritarian regime types have similar audience costs as in democratic states.

A 2021 study found that Americans perceived democracies to be more likely to back down in crises, which contradicts the expectations of the audience costs literature.

=== Democracy differences ===
One general criticism motivating research of different explanations is that actually the theory cannot claim that "democracy causes peace", because the evidence for democracies being, in general, more peaceful is very slight or nonexistent; it only can support the claim that "joint democracy causes peace". According to Rosato, this casts doubts on whether democracy is actually the cause because, if so, a monadic effect would be expected.

Perhaps the simplest explanation to such perceived anomaly (but not the one the Realist Rosato prefers, see the section on Realist explanations below) is that democracies are not peaceful to each other because they are democratic, but rather because they are similar in democratic scores. This line of thought started with several independent observations of an "Autocratic Peace" effect, a reduced probability of war (obviously no author claims its absence) between states which are both non-democratic, or both highly so. This has led to the hypothesis that democratic peace emerges as a particular case when analyzing a subset of states which are, in fact, similar. Or, that similarity in general does not solely affect the probability of war, but only coherence of strong political regimes such as full democracies and stark autocracies.

Autocratic peace and the explanation based on democratic similarity is a relatively recent development, and opinions about its value are varied. Henderson builds a model considering political similarity, geographic distance and economic interdependence as its main variables, and concludes that democratic peace is a statistical artifact which disappears when the above variables are taken into account. Werner finds a conflict reducing effect from political similarity in general, but with democratic dyads being particularly peaceful, and noting some differences in behavior between democratic and autocratic dyads with respect to alliances and power evaluation. Beck, King, and Zeng use neural networks to show two distinct low probability zones, corresponding to high democracy and high autocracy. (Note: Although not discussed in the text, the figure they show (Figure 2) suggests that the democratic peace is stronger.) Petersen uses a different statistical model and finds that autocratic peace is not statistically significant, and that the effect attributed to similarity is mostly driven by the pacifying effect of joint democracy. Ray similarly disputes the weight of the argument on logical grounds, claiming that statistical analysis on "political similarity" uses a main variable which is an extension of "joint democracy" by linguistic redefinition, and so it is expected that the war reducing effects are carried on in the new analysis. Bennett builds a direct statistical model based on a triadic classification of states into "democratic", "autocratic" and "mixed". He finds that autocratic dyads have a 35% reduced chance of going into any type of armed conflict with respect to a reference mixed dyad. Democratic dyads have a 55% reduced chance. This effect gets stronger when looking at more severe conflicts; for wars (more than 1000 battle deaths), he estimates democratic dyads to have an 82% lower risk than autocratic dyads. He concludes that autocratic peace exists, but democratic peace is clearly stronger. However, he finds no relevant pacifying effect of political similarity, except at the extremes of the scale.

To summarize a rather complex picture, there are no less than four possible stances on the value of this criticism:

1. Political similarity, plus some complementary variables, explains everything. Democratic peace is a statistical artifact. Henderson subscribes to this view.
2. Political similarity has a pacifying effect, but democracy makes it stronger. Werner would probably subscribe to this view.
3. Political similarity in general has little or no effect, except at the extremes of the democracy-autocracy scale: a democratic peace and an autocratic peace exist separately, with the first one being stronger, and may have different explanations. Bennett holds this view, and Kinsella mentions this as a possibility
4. Political similarity has little or no effect and there is no evidence for autocratic peace. Petersen and Ray are among defendants of this view.

==== Interactive model of democratic peace ====
The interactive model of democratic peace is a combination of democratic similarity with the traditional model of democratic peace theory demonstrated on V-Dem Democracy Indices.

== Criticism ==
There are several logically distinguishable classes of criticism. They usually apply to no wars or few MIDs between democracies, not to little systematic violence in established democracies. In addition, there have been a number of wars between democracies. The 1987–1989 JVP insurrection in Sri Lanka is an example in which politicide was committed by a democratic regime, resulting in the deaths of at least 13,000 and 30,000 suspected JVP members or alleged supporters.

=== Statistical significance ===
One study has argued that there have been as many wars between democracies as one would expect between any other couple of states. Its authors conclude that the argument for democratic peace "rests in an ambiguity", since empirical evidence not confirm neither deny democratic pacifism, and strongly relies upon what degree of democracy makes a government democratic; according to them "because perfect democracy is infeasible, one can always sidestep counter-evidence by raising the bar of democracy".

Others state that, although there may be some evidence for democratic peace, the data sample or the time span may be too small to assess any definitive conclusions. For example, Gowa finds evidence for democratic peace to be insignificant before 1939, because of the too small number of democracies, and offers an alternate realist explanation for the following period. Gowa's use of statistics has been criticized, with several other studies and reviews finding different or opposing results. However, this can be seen as the longest-lasting criticism to the theory; as noted earlier, also some supporters agree that the statistical sample for assessing its validity is limited or scarce, at least if only full-scale wars are considered.

According to one study, which uses a rather restrictive definition of democracy and war, there were no wars between jointly democratic couples of states in the period from 1816 to 1992. Assuming a purely random distribution of wars between states, regardless of their democratic character, the predicted number of conflicts between democracies would be around ten. So, Ray argues that the evidence is statistically significant, but that it is still conceivable that, in the future, even a small number of inter-democratic wars would cancel out such evidence. (Note: The 1999 Kargil War, subsequent to the period considered, does satisfy the objective requirements for democracy and war set in Ray's study.)

=== Peace comes before democracy ===
The territorial peace theory argues that peace leads to democracy more than democracy leads to peace. This argument is supported by historical studies showing that peace almost always comes before democracy and that states do not develop democracy until all border disputes have been settled. These studies indicate that there is strong evidence that peace causes democracy but little evidence that democracy causes peace.

The hypothesis that peace causes democracy is supported by psychological and cultural theories. Christian Welzel's human empowerment theory posits that existential security leads to emancipative cultural values and support for a democratic political organization. This also follows from the so-called regality theory based on evolutionary psychology.

The territorial peace theory explains why countries in conflict with their neighbor countries are unlikely to develop democracy. The democratic peace theory is more relevant for peace between non-neighbor countries and for relations between countries that are already at peace with each other.

=== Third factors causing both democracy and peace ===
Several other theories argue that omitted variables explain both peace and democracy. Variables that may explain both democracy and peace include institutions, commerce, interdependence, alliances, US world dominance and political stability.

These theories are further explained under Other explanations.

=== Wars against non-democracies ===
Critics of Democratic Peace theory note that liberal states often engage in conflicts with non-liberal states they deem "rogue," "failed," or "evil." Several studies fail to confirm that democracies are less likely to wage war than autocracies if wars against non-democracies are included.

Edward Gibbon stressed that the principal conquests of the Romans were achieved under the republic; and the emperors, for the most part, were satisfied with preserving those dominions which had been acquired by the policy of the Senate, the active emulation of the consuls, and the martial enthusiasm of the people.

=== Signalling ===
The notion that democracies can signal intentions more credibly has been disputed.

=== Criticism of definitions, methodology and data ===
Some authors criticize the definition of democracy by arguing that states continually reinterpret other states' regime types as a consequence of their own objective interests and motives, such as economic and security concerns. For example, one study reports that Germany was considered a democratic state by Western opinion leaders at the end of the 19th century; yet in the years preceding World War I, when its relations with the United States, France and Britain started deteriorating, Germany was gradually reinterpreted as an autocratic state, in absence of any actual regime change. Shimmin moves a similar criticism regarding the western perception of Milosevic's Serbia between 1989 and 1999. Rummel replies to this criticism by stating that, in general, studies on democratic peace do not focus on other countries' perceptions of democracy; and in the specific case of Serbia, by arguing that the limited credit accorded by western democracies to Milosevic in the early 1990s did not amount to a recognition of democracy, but only to the perception that possible alternative leaders could be even worse.

Some democratic peace researchers have been criticized for post hoc reclassifying some specific conflicts as non-wars or political systems as non-democracies without checking and correcting the whole data set used similarly. Supporters and opponents of the democratic peace agree that this is bad use of statistics, even if a plausible case can be made for the correction. A military affairs columnist of the newspaper Asia Times has summarized the above criticism in a journalist's fashion describing the theory as subject to the no true Scotsman problem: exceptions are explained away as not being between "real" democracies or "real" wars.

Some democratic peace researchers require that the executive result from a substantively contested election. This may be a restrictive definition: For example, the National Archives of the United States notes that "For all intents and purposes, George Washington was unopposed for election as President, both in 1789 and 1792". (Under the original provisions for the Electoral College, there was no distinction between votes for president and Vice-president: each elector was required to vote for two distinct candidates, with the runner-up to be vice-president. Every elector cast one of his votes for Washington, John Adams received a majority of the other votes; there were several other candidates: so the election for vice president was contested.)

Spiro made several other criticisms of the statistical methods used. Russett and a series of papers described by Ray responded to this, for example with different methodology.

Sometimes the datasets used have also been criticized. For example, some authors have criticized the Correlates of War data for not including civilian deaths in the battle deaths count, especially in civil wars. Cohen and Weeks argue that most fishing disputes, which include no deaths and generally very limited threats of violence, should be excluded even from the list of military disputes. Gleditsch made several criticisms to the Correlates of War data set, and produced a revised set of data. Maoz and Russett made several criticisms to the Polity I and II data sets, which have mostly been addressed in later versions.

The most comprehensive critique points out that "democracy" is rarely defined, never refers to substantive democracy, is unclear about causation, has been refuted in more than 100 studies, fails to account for some 200 deviant cases, and has been promoted ideologically to justify one country seeking to expand democracy abroad. Most studies treat the complex concept of "democracy" as a bivariate variable rather than attempting to dimensionalize the concept. Studies also fail to take into account the fact that there are dozens of types of democracy, so the results are meaningless unless articulated to a particular type of democracy or claimed to be true for all types, such as consociational or economic democracy, with disparate datasets.

=== Microfoundations ===
Recent work into the democratic norms explanations shows that the microfoundations on which this explanation rest do not find empirical support. Within most earlier studies, the presence of liberal norms in democratic societies and their subsequent influence on the willingness to wage war was merely assumed, never measured. Moreover, it was never investigated whether or not these norms are absent within other regime-types. Two recent studies measured the presence of liberal norms and investigated the assumed effect of these norms on the willingness to wage war. The results of both studies show that liberal democratic norms are not only present within liberal democracies, but also within other regime-types. Moreover, these norms are not of influence on the willingness to attack another state during an interstate conflict at the brink of war.

Sebastian Rosato argues that democratic peace theory makes several false assumptions. Firstly, it assumes that democratic populaces will react negatively to the costs of war upon them. However, in modern wars casualties tend to be fairly low and soldiers are largely volunteers, meaning they accept the risks of fighting, so their families and friends, whom the cost of their death falls on heaviest, are less likely to criticise the government than the families and friends of conscripted soldiers. Secondly, democratic peace theory ignores the role of nationalism; democratic populaces are just as likely to be influenced by nationalist sentiment as anyone else and if a democratic populace believes that a war is necessary for their nation, the populace will support it. Lastly, democratic leaders are as likely to guide public opinion as they are to follow it. Democratic leaders are often aware of the power of nationalist sentiment and thus seek to encourage it when it comes to war, arguing that war is necessary to defend or spread the nation's way of life. Democratic leaders may even have an advatange over authoritarians in this regard, as they can be seen as more legitimately representative. Rosato argues that this does not just apply to wars of defence but also aggression; democratic populaces can be roused by nationalist feelings to support aggressive wars if they are seen as in the national interest.

Rosato also argues that authoritarian leaders have a reduced incentive to go to war because civilian control over the military is less guaranteed in autocracies; there is always the risk the military could subvert civilian leadership and a war which results in defeat could swiftly result in a coup. Even military dictators run the risk of internal dissent within the armed forces. Autocratic leaders in general also risk unleashing political and social turmoil that could destroy them if they go to war. Conversely, bellicose democratic leaders can rely on the acknowledgement of the legitimacy of the democratic process, as pacifist actors in democracies will need to respect the legitimacy of a democratically elected government. If pro-war groups can capture the organs of the state in a democracy legitimately, then anti-war groups will have little means of opposing them outside of extra-constitutional means, which would likely backfire and cause the anti-war groups to lose legitimacy.

A 2017 study found that public opinion in China showed the same reluctance in going to war as publics in democratic states, which suggests that publics in democratic states are not generally more opposed to war than publics in authoritarian states.

=== Limited consequences ===
The peacefulness may have various limitations and qualifiers and may not actually mean very much in the real world.

Democratic peace researchers do in general not count as wars conflicts which do not kill a thousand on the battlefield; thus they exclude for example the bloodless Cod Wars. However, research has also found a peacefulness between democracies when looking at lesser conflicts.

Liberal democracies have less of these wars than other states after 1945. This might be related to changes in the perception of non-European peoples, as embodied in the Universal Declaration of Human Rights.

Related to this is the human rights violations committed against native people, sometimes by liberal democracies. One response is that many of the worst crimes were committed by non-democracies, like in the European colonies before the nineteenth century, in King Leopold II of Belgium's privately owned Congo Free State, and in Joseph Stalin's Soviet Union. The United Kingdom abolished slavery in British territory in 1833, immediately after the Reform Act 1832 had significantly enlarged the franchise. (Of course, the abolition of the slave trade had been enacted in 1807; and many DPT supporters would deny that the UK was a liberal democracy in 1833 when examining interstate wars.)

Hermann and Kegley Jr. argue that interventions between democracies are more likely to happen than projected by an expected model. They further argue that democracies are more likely to intervene in other liberal states than against countries that are non-democracies. Finally, they argue that these interventions between democracies have been increasing over time and that the world can expect more of these interventions in the future. The methodology used has been criticized and more recent studies have found opposing results.

Rummel argues that the continuing increase in democracy worldwide will soon lead to an end to wars and democide, possibly around or even before the middle of this century. The fall of Communism and the increase in the number of democratic states were accompanied by a sudden and dramatic decline in total warfare, interstate wars, ethnic wars, revolutionary wars, and the number of refugees and displaced persons. One report claims that the two main causes of this decline in warfare are the end of the Cold War itself and decolonization; but also claims that the three Kantian factors have contributed materially.

=== Historical periods ===
Economic historians Joel Mokyr and Hans-Joachim Voth argue that democratic states may have been more vulnerable to conquest because the rulers in those states were too heavily constrained. Absolutist rulers in other states could, however, operate more freely.

Adamson et al (2025) finds evidence against democratic peace theory in the ancient world, with evidence instead indicating more intense conflicts between two polities when both were democratic in ancient Greece (Athens-Syracuse) and the Mediterranean (Roman Republic-Carthage) and that ancient democracies were also more belligerent in general. They argue this suggests that democracy's relationship with peace is contingent rather than inherent. Eric Robinson makes a similar proposition, arguing that Greek democracies fought each other even outside of the Athens-Syracuse rivalry (such as in Greek Sicily) and thus democratic peace in the modern day may be due to contextual or structural differences between ancient and modern democracies.

=== Covert operations and proxy wars ===
Critics of the democratic peace theory have pointed to covert operations and military interventions between democracies, and argued that these interventions indicate that democracies do not necessarily trust and respect each other. Alexander B. Downes and Lary Lauren Lilley argue that covert operations conducted by democratic states has different implications depending on which version of democratic peace theory one adheres to. They argue that covert operations are inconsistent with variants of democratic peace theory that emphasize norms and checks-and-balances, but that covert operations may be more consistent with versions of democratic peace theory that rely on selectorate theory's notion of large versus small winning coalitions.

A 2015 study by Michael Poznansky reconciles findings that democracies engage in covert interventions against one another by arguing that democracies do so when they expect another state's democratic character to break down or decay.

A 2022 study found that democracies rarely wage proxy wars against fellow democracies: "strong democratic institutions prevent elected leaders from engaging in proxy war against sister regimes, and embargo violations tend to occur when democratic institutions are weak."

=== Information manipulation ===
Chaim Kaufmann argues that the lead-up to the Iraq War demonstrates that constraints on war in democracies may hinge on whether democratic governments can control and manipulate information, and suppress intelligence findings that run counter to administration rhetoric, as well as whether there is a strong opposition party and powerful media.

=== Coup by provoking a war ===
Many democracies become non-democratic by war, as being aggressed or as aggressor (quickly after a coup), sometimes the coup leader worked to provoke that war.

Carl Schmitt wrote on how to overrule a Constitution: "Sovereign is he who decides on the exception." Schmitt, again on the need for internal (and foreign) enemies because they are useful to persuade the people not to trust anyone more than the Leader: "As long as the state is a political entity this requirement for internal peace compels it in critical situations to decide also upon the domestic enemy. Every state provides, therefore, some kind of formula for the declaration of an internal enemy." Whatever opposition will be pictured and intended as the actual foreign enemy's puppet.

== Other explanations ==
=== Economic factors ===
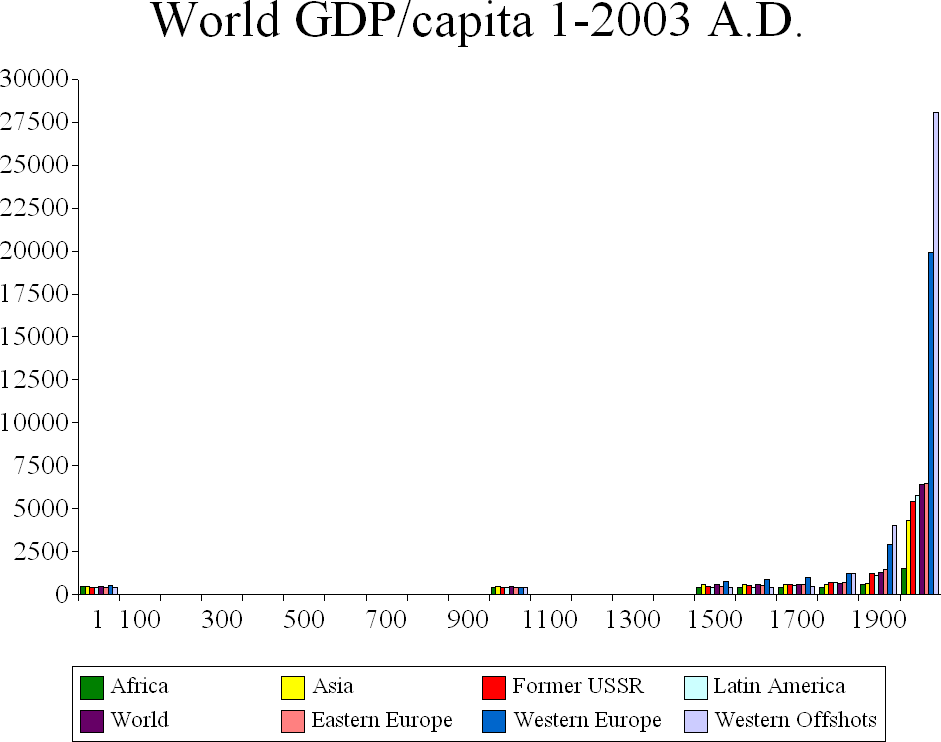
World GDP/capita 1–2003 AD. The increase in the number of democratic nations has occurred at the same time as the increase in economic wealth.

The capitalist peace, or capitalist peace theory, posits that according to given criteria for economic development (capitalism), developed economies have not engaged in war with each other, and rarely enter into low-level disputes. These theories have been proposed as an explanation for democratic peace by accounting for both democracy and the peace among democratic nations. The exact nature of the causality depends upon both the proposed variable and the measure of the indicator for the concept used.

A majority of researchers on the determinants of democracy agree that economic development is a primary factor which allows the formation of a stable and healthy democracy. Thus, some researchers have argued that economic development also plays a factor in the establishment of peace.

Mousseau argues that a culture of contracting in advanced market-oriented economies may cause both democracy and peace. These studies indicate that democracy, alone, is an unlikely cause of the democratic peace. A low level of market-oriented economic development may hinder development of liberal institutions and values. Hegre and Souva confirmed these expectations. Mousseau finds that democracy is a significant factor only when both democracies have levels of economic development well above the global median. In fact, the poorest 21% of the democracies studied, and the poorest 4–5% of current democracies, are significantly more likely than other kinds of countries to fight each other. Mousseau, Hegre, and Oneal confirm that if at least one of the democracies involved has a very low level of economic development, democracy is ineffective in preventing war; however, they find that when also controlling for trade, 91% of all the democratic pairs had high enough development for the pacifying effect of democracy to be important during the 1885–1992 period and all in 1992. The difference in results of these two studies may be due to sampling: Mousseau's 2005 study observed only neighboring states where poor countries actually can fight each other. In fact, fully 89% of militarized conflicts between less developed countries from 1920 and 2000 were among directly contiguous neighbors. He argues that it is not likely that the results can be explained by trade: Because developed states have large economies, they do not have high levels of trade interdependence. In fact, the correlation of developed democracy with trade interdependence is a scant 0.06 (Pearson's r – considered substantively no correlation by statisticians.)

Both World Wars were fought between countries which can be considered economically developed. Mousseau argues that both Germany and Japan – like the USSR during the Cold War and Saudi Arabia today – had state-managed economies and thus lacked his market norms. Hegre finds that democracy is correlated with civil peace only for developed countries, and for countries with high levels of literacy. Conversely, the risk of civil war decreases with development only for democratic countries.

Gartzke argues that economic freedom (a quite different concept from Mousseau's market norms) or financial dependence explains the developed democratic peace, and these countries may be weak on these dimensions too. Rummel criticizes Gartzke's methodology and argues that his results are invalid.

Allan Dafoe, John R. Oneal, and Bruce Russett have challenged Gartzke and Mousseau's research.

Several studies find that democracy, more trade causing greater economic interdependence, and membership in more intergovernmental organizations reduce the risk of war. This is often called the Kantian peace theory since it is similar to Kant's earlier theory about a perpetual peace; it is often also called "liberal peace" theory, especially when one focuses on the effects of trade and democracy. (The theory that free trade can cause peace is quite old and referred to as Cobdenism.) Many researchers agree that these variables positively affect each other but each has a separate pacifying effect. For example, in countries exchanging a substantial amount of trade, economic interest groups may exist that oppose a reciprocal disruptive war, but in democracy such groups may have more power, and the political leaders be more likely to accept their requests. Weede argues that the pacifying effect of free trade and economic interdependence may be more important than that of democracy, because the former affects peace both directly and indirectly, by producing economic development and ultimately, democracy. Weede also lists some other authors supporting this view. However, some recent studies find no effect from trade but only from democracy.

None of the authors listed argues that free trade alone causes peace. Even so, the issue of whether free trade or democracy is more important in maintaining peace may have potentially significant practical consequences, for example on evaluating the effectiveness of applying economic sanctions and restrictions to autocratic countries.

It was Michael Doyle who reintroduced Kant's three articles into democratic peace theory. He argued that a pacific union of liberal states has been growing for the past two centuries. He denies that a pair of states will be peaceful simply because they are both liberal democracies; if that were enough, liberal states would not be aggressive towards weak non-liberal states (as the history of American relations with Mexico shows they are). Rather, liberal democracy is a necessary condition for international organization and hospitality (which are Kant's other two articles)—and all three are sufficient to produce peace. Other Kantians have not repeated Doyle's argument that all three in the triad must be present, instead stating that all three reduce the risk of war.

Immanuel Wallerstein has argued that it is the global capitalist system that creates shared interests among the dominant parties, thus inhibiting potentially harmful belligerence.

Toni Negri and Michael Hardt take a similar stance, arguing that the intertwined network of interests in the global capitalism leads to the decline of individual nation states, and the rise of a global Empire which has no outside, and no external enemies. As a result, they write, "The era of imperialist, interimperialist, and anti-imperialist wars is over. (...) we have entered the era of minor and internal conflicts. Every imperial war is a civil war, a police action".

=== Other explanations ===
Many studies supporting the theory have controlled for many possible alternative causes of the peace. Examples of factors controlled for are geographic distance, geographic contiguity, power status, alliance ties, militarization, economic wealth and economic growth, power ratio, and political stability. These studies have often found very different results depending on methodology and included variables, which has caused criticism. DPT does not state democracy is the only thing affecting the risk of military conflict. Many of the mentioned studies have found that other factors are also important.

Several studies have also controlled for the possibility of reverse causality from peace to democracy. For example, one study supports the theory of simultaneous causation, finding that dyads involved in wars are likely to experience a decrease in joint democracy, which in turn increases the probability of further war. So they argue that disputes between democratizing or democratic states should be resolved externally at a very early stage, in order to stabilize the system. Another study finds that peace does not spread democracy, but spreading democracy is likely to spread peace. A different kind of reverse causation lies in the suggestion that impending war could destroy or decrease democracy, because the preparation for war might include political restrictions, which may be the cause for the findings of democratic peace. However, this hypothesis has been statistically tested in a study whose authors find, depending on the definition of the pre-war period, no such effect or a very slight one. So, they find this explanation unlikely. This explanation would predict a monadic effect, although weaker than the dyadic one.

Weart argues that the peacefulness appears and disappears rapidly when democracy appears and disappears. This in his view makes it unlikely that variables that change more slowly are the explanation. Weart, however, has been criticized for not offering any quantitative analysis supporting his claims.

Wars tend very strongly to be between neighboring states. Gleditsch showed that the average distance between democracies is about 8000 miles, the same as the average distance between all states. He believes that the effect of distance in preventing war, modified by the democratic peace, explains the incidence of war as fully as it can be explained.

A 2020 study in International Organization found that it was not democracy per se that reduces the prospects for conflict, but whether women's suffrage was ensured. The study argued, "women's more pacific preferences generate a dyadic democratic peace (i.e., between democracies), as well as a monadic peace."

According to Azar Gat's War in Human Civilization, there are several related and independent factors that contribute to democratic societies being more peaceful than other forms of governments:

1. Wealth and comfort: Increased prosperity in democratic societies has been associated with peace because civilians are less willing to endure hardship of war and military service due to a more luxurious life at home than in pre-modern times. Increased wealth has worked to decrease war through comfort.
2. Metropolitan service society: The majority of army recruits come from the countryside or factory workers. Many believe that these types of people are suited for war. But as technology progressed the army turned more towards advanced services in information that rely more on computerized data which urbanized people are recruited more for this service.
3. Sexual revolution: The availability of sex due to the pill and women joining the labor market could be another factor that has led to less enthusiasm for men to go to war. Young men are more reluctant leave behind the pleasures of life for the rigors and chastity of the army.
4. Fewer young males: There is greater life expectancy which leads to fewer young males. Young males are the most aggressive and the ones that join the army the most. With fewer younger males in developed societies could help explain more pacificity.
5. Fewer children per family (lower fertility rate): During pre modern times it was always hard for families to lose a child but in modern times it has become more difficult due to more families having only one or two children. It has become even harder for parents to risk the loss of a child in war. However, Gat recognizes that this argument is a difficult one because during pre modern times the life expectancy was not high for children and bigger families were necessary.
6. Women's franchise: Women are less overtly aggressive than men. Therefore, women are less inclined to serious violence and do not support it as much as men do. In liberal democracies women have been able to influence the government by getting elected. Electing more women could have an effect on whether liberal democracies take a more aggressive approach on certain issues.
7. Nuclear weapons: Nuclear weapons could be the reason for not having a great power war. Many believe that a nuclear war would result in mutually assured destruction (MAD) which means that both countries involved in a nuclear war have the ability to strike the other until both sides are wiped out. This results in countries not wanting to strike the other for fear of being wiped out.

=== Realist explanations ===
Supporters of realism in international relations in general argue that not democracy or its absence, but considerations and evaluations of power, cause peace or war. Specifically, many realist critics claim that the effect ascribed to democratic, or liberal, peace, is in fact due to alliance ties between democratic states which in turn are caused, one way or another, by realist factors.

For example, Farber and Gowa find evidence for peace between democracies to be statistically significant only in the period from 1945 on, and consider such peace an artifact of the Cold War, when the threat from the communist states forced democracies to ally with one another. Mearsheimer offers a similar analysis of the Anglo-American peace before 1945, caused by the German threat. Spiro finds several instances of wars between democracies, arguing that evidence in favor of the theory might be not so vast as other authors report, and claims that the remaining evidence consists of peace between allied states with shared objectives. He acknowledges that democratic states might have a somewhat greater tendency to ally with one another, and regards this as the only real effect of democratic peace. Rosato argues that most of the significant evidence for democratic peace has been observed after World War II; and that it has happened within a broad alliance, which can be identified with NATO and its satellite nations, imposed and maintained by American dominance as part of Pax Americana. One of the main points in Rosato's argument is that, although never engaged in open war with another liberal democracy during the Cold War, the United States intervened openly or covertly in the political affairs of democratic states several times, for example in the Chilean coup of 1973, the Operation Ajax (1953 coup in Iran) and Operation PBSuccess (1954 coup in Guatemala); in Rosato's view, these interventions show the United States' determination to maintain an "imperial peace".

The most direct counter arguments to such criticisms have been studies finding peace between democracies to be significant even when controlling for "common interests" as reflected in alliance ties. Regarding specific issues, Ray objects that explanations based on the Cold War should predict that the Communist bloc would be at peace within itself also, but exceptions include the Soviet Invasion of Afghanistan, the Cambodian-Vietnamese War, and the Sino-Vietnamese War. Ray also argues that the external threat did not prevent conflicts in the Western bloc when at least one of the involved states was a non-democracy, such as the Turkish Invasion of Cyprus (against Greek Junta supported Cypriot Greeks), the Falklands War, and the Football War. Also, one study notes that the explanation "goes increasingly stale as the post-Cold War world accumulates an increasing number of peaceful dyad-years between democracies". Rosato's argument about American dominance has also been criticized for not giving supporting statistical evidence.

Some realist authors also criticize in detail the explanations first by supporters of democratic peace, pointing to supposed inconsistencies or weaknesses.

Rosato criticizes most explanations to how democracy might cause peace. Arguments based on normative constraints, he argues, are not consistent with the fact that democracies do go to war no less than other states, thus violating norms preventing war; for the same reason he refutes arguments based on the importance of public opinion. Regarding explanations based on greater accountability of leaders, he finds that historically autocratic leaders have been removed or punished more often than democratic leaders when they get involved in costly wars. Finally, he also criticizes the arguments that democracies treat each other with trust and respect even during crises; and that democracy might be slow to mobilize its composite and diverse groups and opinions, hindering the start of a war, drawing support from other authors. Another realist, Layne, analyzes the crises and brinkmanship that took place between non-allied democratic great powers, during the relatively brief period when such existed. He finds no evidence either of institutional or cultural constraints against war; indeed, there was popular sentiment in favor of war on both sides. Instead, in all cases, one side concluded that it could not afford to risk that war at that time, and made the necessary concessions.

Rosato's objections have been criticized for claimed logical and methodological errors, and for being contradicted by existing statistical research. Russett replies to Layne by re-examining some of the crises studied in his article, and reaching different conclusions; Russett argues that perceptions of democracy prevented escalation, or played a major role in doing so. Also, a recent study finds that, while in general the outcome of international disputes is highly influenced by the contenders' relative military strength, this is not true if both contenders are democratic states; in this case the authors find the outcome of the crisis to be independent of the military capabilities of contenders, which is contrary to realist expectations. Finally, both the realist criticisms here described ignore new possible explanations, like the game-theoretic one discussed below.

=== Nuclear deterrent ===
A different kind of realist criticism stresses the role of nuclear weapons in maintaining peace. In realist terms, this means that, in the case of disputes between nuclear powers, respective evaluation of power might be irrelevant because of Mutual assured destruction preventing both sides from foreseeing what could be reasonably called a "victory". The 1999 Kargil War between India and Pakistan has been cited as a counterexample to this argument, though this was a small, regional conflict and the threat of WMDs being used contributed to its de-escalation.

Some supporters of the democratic peace do not deny that realist factors are also important. Research supporting the theory has also shown that factors such as alliance ties and major power status influence interstate conflict behavior.

== Statistical difficulties due to newness of democracy ==
Number of nations 1800–2018 scoring 8 or higher on Polity5 scale. There have been no wars and in Wayman's listing of interliberal MIDs no conflict causing any battle deaths between these nations.

One problem with the research on wars is that, as the Realist John Mearsheimer put it, "democracies have been few in number over the past two centuries, and thus there have been few opportunities where democracies were in a position to fight one another". Democracies have been very rare until recently. Even looser definitions of democracy, such as Doyle's, find only a dozen democracies before the late nineteenth century, and many of them short-lived or with limited franchise. Freedom House finds no independent state with universal suffrage in 1900.

Wayman, a supporter of the theory, states that "If we rely solely on whether there has been an inter-democratic war, it is going to take many more decades of peace to build our confidence in the stability of the democratic peace".

=== Studying lesser conflicts ===
Many researchers have reacted to this limitation by studying lesser conflicts instead, since they have been far more common. There have been many more MIDs than wars; the Correlates of War Project counts several thousand during the last two centuries. A review lists many studies that have reported that democratic pairs of states are less likely to be involved in MIDs than other pairs of states.

Another study finds that after both states have become democratic, there is a decreasing probability for MIDs within a year and this decreases almost to zero within five years.

When examining the inter-liberal MIDs in more detail, one study finds that they are less likely to involve third parties, and that the target of the hostility is less likely to reciprocate, if the target reciprocates the response is usually proportional to the provocation, and the disputes are less likely to cause any loss of life. The most common action was "Seizure of Material or Personnel".

Studies find that the probability that disputes between states will be resolved peacefully is positively affected by the degree of democracy exhibited by the lesser democratic state involved in that dispute. Disputes between democratic states are significantly shorter than disputes involving at least one undemocratic state. Democratic states are more likely to be amenable to third party mediation when they are involved in disputes with each other.

In international crises that include the threat or use of military force, one study finds that if the parties are democracies, then relative military strength has no effect on who wins. This is different from when non-democracies are involved. These results are the same also if the conflicting parties are formal allies. Similarly, a study of the behavior of states that joined ongoing militarized disputes reports that power is important only to autocracies: democracies do not seem to base their alignment on the power of the sides in the dispute.

== Academic relevance and derived studies ==
Democratic peace theory is a well established research field with more than a hundred authors having published articles about it. Several peer-reviewed studies mention in their introduction that most researchers accept the theory as an empirical fact. According to a 2021 study by Kosuke Imai and James Lo, "overturning the negative association between democracy and conflict would require a confounder that is forty-seven times more prevalent in democratic dyads than in other dyads. To put this number in context, the relationship between democracy and peace is at least five times as robust as that between smoking and lung cancer. To explain away the democratic peace, therefore, scholars would have to find far more powerful confounders than those already identified in the literature."

Imre Lakatos suggested that what he called a "progressive research program" is better than a "degenerative" one when it can explain the same phenomena as the "degenerative" one, but is also characterized by growth of its research field and the discovery of important novel facts. In contrast, the supporters of the "degenerative" program do not make important new empirical discoveries, but instead mostly apply adjustments to their theory in order to defend it from competitors. Some researchers argue that democratic peace theory is now the "progressive" program in international relations. According to these authors, the theory can explain the empirical phenomena previously explained by the earlier dominant research program, realism in international relations; in addition, the initial statement that democracies do not, or rarely, wage war on one another, has been followed by a rapidly growing literature on novel empirical regularities.

Other examples are several studies finding that democracies are more likely to ally with one another than with other states, forming alliances which are likely to last longer than alliances involving non-democracies; several studies showing that democracies conduct diplomacy differently and in a more conciliatory way compared to non-democracies; one study finding that democracies with proportional representation are in general more peaceful regardless of the nature of the other party involved in a relationship; and another study reporting that proportional representation system and decentralized territorial autonomy is positively associated with lasting peace in postconflict societies.

== Influence ==
The democratic peace theory has been extremely divisive among political scientists. It is rooted in the idealist and classical liberalist traditions and is opposed to the dominant theory of realism.

In the United States, presidents from both major parties have expressed support for the theory. In his 1994 State of the Union address, then-President Bill Clinton, a member of the Democratic Party, said: "Ultimately, the best strategy to ensure our security and to build a durable peace is to support the advance of democracy elsewhere. Democracies don't attack each other". In a 2004 press conference, then-President George W. Bush, a member of the Republican Party, said: "And the reason why I'm so strong on democracy is democracies don't go to war with each other. And the reason why is the people of most societies don't like war, and they understand what war means.... I've got great faith in democracies to promote peace. And that's why I'm such a strong believer that the way forward in the Middle East, the broader Middle East, is to promote democracy." (Note: "History has taught us democracies don't war. Democracies – you don't run for office in a democracy and say, please vote for me, I promise you war. (Laughter.) You run for office in democracies, and say, vote for me, I'll represent your interests; vote for me, I'll help your young girls go to school, or the health care you get improved.")

In a 1999 speech, Chris Patten, the then-European Commissioner for External Relations, said: "Inevitable because the EU was formed partly to protect liberal values, so it is hardly surprising that we should think it appropriate to speak out. But it is also sensible for strategic reasons. Free societies tend not to fight one another or to be bad neighbours". The A Secure Europe in a Better World, European Security Strategy states: "The best protection for our security is a world of well-governed democratic states." Tony Blair has also claimed the theory is correct.

=== As justification for initiating war ===
Some fear that the democratic peace theory may be used to justify wars against non-democracies in order to bring lasting peace, in a democratic crusade. Woodrow Wilson in 1917 asked Congress to declare war against Imperial Germany, citing Germany's sinking of American ships due to unrestricted submarine warfare and the Zimmermann telegram, but also stating that "A steadfast concert for peace can never be maintained except by a partnership of democratic nations" and "The world must be made safe for democracy." (Note: Wilson's vision for the world after World War I, his Fourteen Points (1918), did not mention democracy, but in other aspects "sound almost as though Kant were guiding Wilson's writing hand." They included both Kant's cosmopolitan law and pacific union. The third of the Fourteen Points specified the removal of economic barriers between peaceful nations; the fourteenth provided for the League of Nations.) R. J. Rummel was a notable proponent of war for the purpose of spreading democracy, based on this theory.

Some point out that the democratic peace theory has been used to justify the 2003 Iraq War, others argue that this justification was used only after the war had already started. Furthermore, Weede has argued that the justification is extremely weak, because forcibly democratizing a country completely surrounded by non-democracies, most of which are full autocracies, as Iraq was, is at least as likely to increase the risk of war as it is to decrease it (some studies show that dyads formed by one democracy and one autocracy are the most warlike, and several find that the risk of war is greatly increased in democratizing countries surrounded by non-democracies). According to Weede, if the United States and its allies wanted to adopt a rationale strategy of forced democratization based on democratic peace, which he still does not recommend, it would be best to start intervening in countries which border with at least one or two stable democracies, and expand gradually. Also, research shows that attempts to create democracies by using external force has often failed. Gleditsch, Christiansen, and Hegre argue that forced democratization by interventionism may initially have partial success, but often create an unstable democratizing country, which can have dangerous consequences in the long run. Those attempts which had a permanent and stable success, like democratization in Austria, West Germany and Japan after World War II, mostly involved countries which had an advanced economic and social structure already, and implied a drastic change of the whole political culture. Supporting internal democratic movements and using diplomacy may be far more successful and less costly. Thus, the theory and related research, if they were correctly understood, may actually be an argument against a democratic crusade.

Michael Haas has written perhaps the most trenchant critique of a hidden normative agenda. Among the points raised: Due to sampling manipulation, the research creates the impression that democracies can justifiably fight non-democracies, snuff out budding democracies, or even impose democracy. And due to sloppy definitions, there is no concern that democracies continue undemocratic practices yet remain in the sample as if pristine democracies.

This criticism is confirmed by David Keen who finds that almost all historical attempts to impose democracy by violent means have failed.

== Related theories ==
=== Republican liberalism ===
Republican liberalism is a variation of Democratic Peace Theory which claims that liberal and republican democracies will rarely go to war with each other. It argues that these governments are more peaceful than non-democracies and will avoid conflict when possible. According to Micheal Doyle, there are three main reasons for this: Democracies tend to have similar domestic political cultures, they share common morals, and their economic systems are interdependent. Liberal democracies (republics) that trade with each other, are economically dependent on one another and therefore, will always attempt to maintain diplomatic relations as to not disrupt their economies.

Liberalism, as an overarching theory, holds that diplomacy and cooperation is the most effective way to avoid war and maintain peace. This is contrasting to the theory of realism, which states that conflict will always be recurrent in the international system, whether due to human nature or the anarchic international system.

The concept of Republican liberalism is thought to have initially originated from Immanuel Kant's book "Perpetual Peace: A Philosophical Sketch" (1795). The term "Perpetual Peace" refers to the permanent establishment of peace, and was made notorious by the book. Democratic peace, commercial peace and institutional peace were all advanced in the book as well. It takes a rather utopian view, that humanities' desire for peace will out compete humanities' desire for war.

=== Kantian liberalism ===
Kant and the liberal school of thought view international co-operation as a more rational option for states than resorting to war. However, the neo-liberal approach concedes to the realist school of thought, that when states cooperate it is simply because it is in their best interest. Kant insisted that a world with only peace was possible, and he offered three definitive articles that would create the pathway for it. Each went on to become a dominant strain of post–World War II liberal international relations theory.

I: "The Civil Constitution of Every State should be Republican"

Kant believed that every state should have Republican style form of government. As in, a state where "supreme power is held by the people and their elected representatives." Kant saw this in Ancient Rome, where they began to move away from Athenian democracy (direct democracy) and towards a representative democracy. Kant believed giving the citizens the right to vote and decide for themselves would lead to shorter wars and less wars. He also thought it was important to "check the power of monarchs", to establish a system of checks and balances where no one person holds absolute power. Peace is always dependent on the internal character of governments. Republics, with a legislative body that will be able to hold the executive leader in check and maintain the peace.

II: "The Law of Nations shall be founded on a Federation of Free States"

Kant argues nations, like individuals can be tempted to harm each other at any given moment. So, rule of law should be established internationally. Without international laws and courts of judgement, then force would be the only way to settle disputes. States ought to instead develop international organisations and rules that facilitate cooperation. In any case, some kind of federation is necessary in order to maintain peace between nations. Contemporary examples include the United Nations and the European Union, which try to maintain peace and encourage cooperation among nations.

III: "The Law of World Citizenship shall be Limited to Conditions of Universal Hospitality"

Kant is referring to "the right of the stranger not to be treated as an enemy when he arrives in the land of another.". So long "stranger" is peaceful, he should not be treated with hostility. However, this is not the right to be a "permanent visitor", simply as a temporary stay. This is applicable in the contemporary world when a country is receiving a world leader. The host country usually holds a state welcoming ceremony which strengthens diplomatic relations.

=== European peace ===
There is significant debate over whether the lack of any major European general wars since 1945 is due to cooperation and integration of liberal-democratic European states themselves (as in the European Union or Franco-German cooperation), an enforced peace due to the intervention of the Soviet Union and the United States until 1989 and the United States alone thereafter, or a combination of both. The debate over this theory was thrust in the public eye when the 2012 Nobel Peace Prize was awarded to the European Union for its role in creating peace in Europe. Notable major wars in Europe after 1945 are Yugoslav Wars and Russian invasion of Ukraine, which follows the prediction of the interactive model of democratic peace.

== See also ==
- Global Peace Index
- Peace and conflict studies

== Bibliography ==
- Abadie, Alberto (2004). "Poverty, Political Freedom, and the Roots of Terrorism" (PDF). NBER Working Paper Series. Archived from the original (PDF) on September 6, 2005.
- Abulof, Uriel; Goldman, Ogen (2015). "The Domestic Democratic Peace in the Middle East" (PDF). International Journal of Conflict and Violence. 9 (5). Archived (PDF) from the original on October 19, 2015.
- Babst, Dean V. (1964). "Elective Governments—A Force For Peace". The Wisconsin Sociologist. 3 (1): 9–14.
- Babst, Dean V. (April 1972). "A Force For Peace". Industrial Research: 55–58.
- Bakker, Femke E. (2017). "Do liberal norms matter? A cross-regime experimental investigation of the normative explanation of the democratic peace thesis in China and The Netherlands" (PDF). Acta Politica. 52 (4): 521–543. doi:10.1057/s41269-016-0002-4. hdl:1887/74424. ISSN 0001-6810. S2CID 148403388.
- Bakker, Femke E. (May 15, 2018). Hawks and Doves. Democratic Pace Theory Revisited (Thesis). Leiden University.
- Barnhart, Joslyn N.; Trager, Robert F.; Saunders, Elizabeth N.; Dafoe, Allan (2020). "The Suffragist Peace". International Organization. 74 (4): 633–670. doi:10.1017/S0020818320000508. ISSN 0020-8183. S2CID 221130902.
- Beck, Nathaniel; King, Gary; Zeng, Langche (2004). "Theory and Evidence in International Conflict: A Response to de Marchi, Gelpi, and Grynaviski" (PDF). American Political Science Review. 98 (2): 379–389. doi:10.1017/s0003055404001212. S2CID 16772841.
- Beck, Nathaniel; Jackman, Simon (1998). "Beyond Linearity by Default: Generalized Additive Models". American Journal of Political Science. 42 (2): 596–627. doi:10.2307/2991772. JSTOR 2991772.
- Bell, Mark S.; Quek, Kai (2017). "Authoritarian Public Opinion and the Democratic Peace". International Organization. 72 (1): 227–242. doi:10.1017/S002081831700042X. ISSN 0020-8183. S2CID 158756298.
- Bennett, Scott D. (2006). "Toward a Continuous Specification of the Democracy-Autocracy Connection". International Studies Quarterly. 50 (2): 313–338. doi:10.1111/j.1468-2478.2006.00404.x.
- Binningsbø, Helga Malmin (2005). "Consociational Democracy and Postconflict Peace. Will Power-Sharing Institutions Increase the Probability of Lasting Peace after Civil War?" (PDF). Paper Prepared for Presentation at the 13th Annual National Political Science Conference, Hurdalsjøen, Norway, 5–7 January 2005. Archived from the original (PDF) on December 18, 2008.
- Braumoeller, Bear F (1997). "Deadly Doves: Liberal Nationalism and the Democratic Peace in the Soviet Successor States". International Studies Quarterly. 41 (3): 375–402. doi:10.1111/0020-8833.00049. hdl:2027.42/146804. JSTOR 2600789.
- Braumoeller, Bear F (2004). "Hypothesis Testing and Multiplicative Interaction Terms" (PDF). International Organization. 58 (4): 807–820. doi:10.1017/s0020818304040251 (inactive January 25, 2026). S2CID 56361860.
- Bremer, Stuart A. (June 1992). "Dangerous Dyads: Conditions Affecting the Likelihood of Interstate War, 1816–1965". The Journal of Conflict Resolution. 36 (2): 309–341. doi:10.1177/0022002792036002005. JSTOR 174478. S2CID 144107474.
- Bremer, Stuart A. (1993). "Democracy and Militarized Interstate Conflict, 1816–1965". International Interactions. 18 (3): 231–249. doi:10.1080/03050629308434806.
- Carter, Jeff (2017). "The Political Cost of War Mobilization in Democracies and Dictatorships". Journal of Conflict Resolution. 61 (8): 1768–1794. doi:10.1177/0022002715620469. ISSN 0022-0027. S2CID 150763546.
- Cashman, Greg (2013). What Causes War?: An Introduction to Theories of International Conflict (2nd ed.). Rowman & Littlefield.
- Chan, Steve (1997). "In Search of Democratic Peace: Problems and Promise". Mershon International Studies Review. 41 (1): 59–91. doi:10.2307/222803. JSTOR 222803.
- Chernoff, Fred (2004). "The Study of Democratic Peace and Progress in International Relations". International Studies Review. 6 (1): 1079–1760. doi:10.1111/j.1079-1760.2004.00372.x.
- Clemens, Walter C. Jr. (2002). "Complexity Theory as a Tool for Understanding and Coping with Ethnic Conflict and Development Issues in Post-Soviet Eurasia". The International Journal of Peace Studies. 7 (2): 1–15.
- Clinton, Bill (January 28, 2000). "1994 State Of The Union Address". The Washington Post. Archived from the original on August 16, 2000.
- Cohen, Dara K.; Weeks, Jessica (2006). "Red Herings? Fishing Disputes, Regime Type, and Interstate Conflict" (PDF). Presented at the Stanford International Relations Workshop. Archived from the original (PDF) on March 21, 2006.
- Coleman, Charles D. (2002). "Why Don't Democracies Go to War?" (PDF). Tullock Festschrift..
- Dafoe, Allan; Oneal, John R.; Russett, Bruce (2013). "The Democratic Peace: Weighing the Evidence and Cautious Inference". International Studies Quarterly. 57 (1): 201–214. doi:10.1111/isqu.12055. ISSN 0020-8833.
- Davenport, Christian; Armstrong II, David A (2003). "Peace by Piece: Towards an Understanding of Exactly How Democracy Reduces State Repression" (PDF). Presented at the Midwest Political Science Association, 61st Annual Meeting, Chicago. April 3–6, 2003. Archived from the original (PDF) on October 25, 2005.
- Davenport, Christian; Armstrong II, David A (2004). "Democracy and the Violation of Human Rights: A Statistical Analysis from 1976 to 1996" (PDF). American Journal of Political Science. 48 (3): 538–554. doi:10.1111/j.0092-5853.2004.00086.x. Archived from the original (PDF) on September 4, 2006.
- de Mesquita, Bruce Bueno; Morrow, James D.; Siverson, Randolph M.; Smith, Alastair (1999). "An Institutional Explanation of the Democratic Peace". The American Political Science Review. 93 (4): 791–807. doi:10.2307/2586113. ISSN 0003-0554. JSTOR 2586113. S2CID 54953575.
- Deudney, Daniel H. (2007). Bounding Power: Republican Security Theory from the Polis to the Global Village. Princeton University Press. ISBN 978-1-4008-3727-4.
- Democracy's Century: A Survey of Global Political Change in the 20th Century. Freedom House. 1999.
- "Democratic Peace Clock". n.d. Archived from the original on February 8, 2006.
- Doyle, Michael W. (Summer 1983a). "Kant, Liberal Legacies, and Foreign Affairs". Philosophy and Public Affairs. 12 (3): 205–235. JSTOR 2265298.
- Doyle, Michael W. (Autumn 1983b). "Kant, Liberal Legacies, and Foreign Affairs, Part 2". Philosophy and Public Affairs. 12 (4): 323–353. JSTOR 2265377.
- Doyle, Michael W. (1997). Ways of War and Peace. New York: W.W. Norton. ISBN 978-0-393-96947-4.
- Doyle, Michael W. (2017). "Kant, Liberal Legacies, and Foreign Affairs". Immanuel Kant. Routledge. pp. 503–533. doi:10.4324/9781315252629-22. ISBN 978-1-315-25262-9.
- A Secure Europe in a Better World: European Security Strategy. Brussels: EEAS Strategic Planning. December 12, 2003. Archived from the original on October 15, 2015.
- Farber, Henry S.; Gowa, Joanne (Fall 1995). "Polities and Peace". International Security. 20 (2): 123. doi:10.2307/2539231. JSTOR 2539231. S2CID 154556138.
- Fearon, James D. (September 1994). "Domestic Political Audiences and the Escalation of International Dispute". American Political Science Review. 88 (3): 577–592. doi:10.2307/2944796. JSTOR 2944796. S2CID 36315471.
- Frost, Robert I. (2000). The northern wars: war, state and society in northeastern Europe, 1558–1721. Harlow, England; New York: Longman's. ISBN 978-0-582-06429-4.
- Gartzke, Erik. "Economic Freedom and Peace". In Gwartney, Lawson & Gartzke (2005).
- Gartzke, Erik (2007). "The Capitalist Peace". American Journal of Political Science. 51 (1): 166–191. doi:10.1111/j.1540-5907.2007.00244.x.
- Gat, Azar (2006). War in Human Civilization. New York: Oxford University Press.
- Gat, Azar (2017). The Causes of War and the Spread of Peace: Will War Rebound?. Oxford University Press.
- Gelpi, Christopher F.; Griesdorf, Michael (2001). "Winners or Losers? Democracies in International Crisis, 1918–94" (PDF). American Political Science Review. 95 (3): 633–647. doi:10.1017/s0003055401003148. S2CID 146346368. Archived from the original (PDF) on February 13, 2005.
- George, Alexander L.; Bennett, Andrew (2005). Case Studies and Theory Development in the Social Sciences. MIT Press. ISBN 978-0-262-30307-1. OCLC 944521872.
- Gibler, Douglas M.; Miller, Steven V. (2021). "The Territorial Peace: Current and Future Research". In McLaughlin, Sara; Vasquez, John A. (eds.). What do we know about War? (3 ed.). Rowman & Littlefield. pp. 158–170.
- Gibler, Douglas M.; Owsiak, Andrew (2017). "Democracy and the Settlement of International Borders, 1919–2001". Journal of Conflict Resolution. 62 (9): 1847–1875. doi:10.1177/0022002717708599. S2CID 158036471.
- Downes, Alexander B.; Lilley, Mary Lauren (2010). "Overt Peace, Covert War?: Covert Intervention and the Democratic Peace". Security Studies. 19 (2): 266–306. doi:10.1080/09636411003795756. ISSN 0963-6412. S2CID 153379252.
- Downes, Alexander B.; Sechser, Todd S. (2012). "The Illusion of Democratic Credibility". International Organization. 66 (3): 457–489. doi:10.1017/S0020818312000161. ISSN 0020-8183. JSTOR 23279964. S2CID 154325372.
- Gleditsch, Nils P. (1992). "Democracy and Peace". Journal of Peace Research. 29 (4): 369–376. doi:10.1177/0022343392029004001. JSTOR 425538. S2CID 110790206.
- Gleditsch, Nils P (1995). "Geography, democracy and peace". International Interactions. 20 (4): 297–314. doi:10.1080/03050629508434853.
- Gleditsch, Nils Petter; Christiansen, Lene Siljeholm; Hegre, Håvard (2004). "Democratic Jihad? Military Intervention and Democracy" (PDF). Paper Prepared for the 45th Annual Convention of the International Studies Association, 17–20 March 2004. Archived from the original (PDF) on September 27, 2007.
- Goenner, Cullen F (2004). "Uncertainty of the Liberal Peace" (PDF). Journal of Peace Research. 41 (5): 589–605. doi:10.1177/0022343304045977. S2CID 5270352. Archived from the original (PDF) on June 25, 2006.
- Gowa, Joanne (1999). Ballots and Bullets: The Elusive Democratic Peace. Princeton: Princeton University Press. ISBN 978-0-691-07022-3.
- Grauer, Ryan; Tierney, Dominic (2022). "The democratic embargo: regime type and proxy war". European Journal of International Relations. 28 (2): 444–470. doi:10.1177/13540661221089489. ISSN 1354-0661. S2CID 248196369.
- Gwartney, James; Lawson, Robert; Gartzke, Erik (2005). Economic Freedom of the World: Annual Report 2015. Fraser Institute. ISBN 978-0-88975-222-1. Archived from the original on September 4, 2006.
- Haas, Michael (1997). "Deconstructing the Democratic Peace". In Haas, Michael (ed.). Deconstructing International Relations Theory. New York: Norton. pp. 127–148.
- Haas, Michael (2014). Deconstructing the 'Democratic Peace': How a Research Agenda Boomeranged. Los Angeles, CA: Publishinghouse for Scholars.
- Hardt, Michael; Negri, Antonio (2000). Empire. Cambridge (MA): Harvard University Press. ISBN 978-0-674-00671-3.
- Harff, Barbara (2003). "No Lessons Learned from the Holocaust? Assessing Risks of Genocide and Political Mass Murder since 1955" (PDF). American Political Science Review. 97 (1): 57–73. doi:10.1017/S0003055403000522. S2CID 54804182. Archived from the original (PDF) on March 22, 2006.
- Harff, Barbara (2017). "The Comparative Analysis of Mass Atrocities and Genocide" (PDF). In Gleditish, N. P. (ed.). R.J. Rummel: An Assessment of His Many Contributions. SpringerBriefs on Pioneers in Science and Practice. Vol. 37. New York City, New York: Springer. pp. 111–129. doi:10.1007/978-3-319-54463-2_12. ISBN 978-3-319-54463-2.
- Harrison, Ewan (2010). "The Democratic Peace Research Program and System Level Analysis". Journal of Peace Research. 47 (2): 155–165. doi:10.1177/0022343309356490. S2CID 143880244.
- Hegre, Havard (2000). "Development and the Liberal Peace: What does it Take to Be a Trading State?". Journal of Peace Research. 37: 5–30. doi:10.1177/0022343300037001001. S2CID 110399907.
- Hegre, Håvard (2004). The Limits of the Liberal Peace (PDF) (Ph.D. Thesis). University of Oslo. Archived from the original (PDF) on July 20, 2007.
- Hegre, Håvard (2014). "Democracy and armed conflict". Journal of Peace Research. 51 (2): 159–172. doi:10.1177/0022343313512852. ISSN 0022-3433. S2CID 146428562.
- Hegre, Håvard; Ellington, Tanja; Gates, Scott; Gleditsch, Nils Petter (2001). "Towards A Democratic Civil Peace? Opportunity, Grievance, and Civil War 1816–1992". American Political Science Review. 95 (1): 33–48. doi:10.1017/S0003055401000119. S2CID 7521813. Archived from the original on April 6, 2004.
- Hegre, Håvard (2003). "Disentangling Democracy and Development as Determinants of Armed Conflict (required)" (PDF). Presented at the Annual Meeting of the International Studies Association. Archived from the original (PDF) on September 27, 2007.
- Hellmann, Gunther; Herborth, Benjamin (2008). "Fishing in the mild West: democratic peace and militarised interstate disputes in the transatlantic community". Review of International Studies. 34 (3): 481–506. doi:10.1017/S0260210508008139. ISSN 1469-9044. S2CID 144997884.
- Henderson, Errol (2002). Democracy and War, the End of an Illusion?. Boulder: Lynne Reiner.
- Hensel, Paul R.; Goertz, Gary; Diehl, Paul F. (2000). "The Democratice Peace and Rivalries" (PDF). Journal of Politics. 64 (4): 1173–88. doi:10.1111/0022-3816.00052. S2CID 154641833. Archived from the original (PDF) on May 13, 2005.
- Hermann, Margaret G.; Kegley, Jr., Charles W. (1995). "Military Intervention and The Democratic Peace". International Interactions. 21 (1): 1–21. doi:10.1080/03050629508434857.
- Hermann, Margaret G.; Kegley, Jr., Charles W. (1996). "How Democracies Use Intervention: A Neglected Dimension in Studies of the Democratic Peace". Journal of Peace Research. 33 (3): 309–322. doi:10.1177/0022343396033003005. S2CID 145500606.
- Hermann, Margaret G.; Kegley, Jr., Charles W. (February 1997). "Putting Military Intervention into the Democratic Peace: A Research Note". Comparative Political Studies. 30 (1): 78–107. doi:10.1177/0010414097030001004. S2CID 154775077.
- Hermann, Margaret G.; Kegley, Jr., Charles W. (June 1998). "The U.S. Use of Military Intervention to Promote Democracy: Evaluating the Record". International Interactions. 24 (2): 91–114. doi:10.1080/03050629808434922.
- Hobson, Christopher (2017). "Democratic Peace: Progress and Crisis". Perspectives on Politics. 15 (3): 697–710. doi:10.1017/S1537592717000913. ISSN 1537-5927. S2CID 149278000.
- Human Security Report 2005: War and Peace in the 21st Century. New York: Oxford University Press. 2005. ISBN 978-0-19-530739-9. Archived from the original on January 19, 2006.
- Imai, Kosuke; Lo, James (2021). "Robustness of Empirical Evidence for the Democratic Peace: A Nonparametric Sensitivity Analysis". International Organization. 75 (3): 901–919. doi:10.1017/S0020818321000126. ISSN 0020-8183.
- Jervis, Robert (2002). "Theories of War in an Era of Leading-Power Peace" (PDF). American Political Science Review. 96 (1): 1–14. doi:10.1017/s0003055402004197. S2CID 154839252. Archived from the original (PDF) on March 19, 2005.
- Joas, Hans; Knöbl, Wolfgang (2013). War in social thought: Hobbes to the present. Princeton University Press.
- Joyner, James (2012). "Why NATO Should Have Won the Nobel". Archived from the original on October 17, 2012.
- Kim, Hyung Min; Rousseau, David L. (2005). "The Classical Liberals Were Half Right (or Half Wrong): New Tests of the 'Liberal Peace', 1960–88" (PDF). Journal of Peace Research. 42 (5): 523–543. doi:10.1177/0022343305056225. S2CID 145441516. Archived from the original (PDF) on September 27, 2007.
- Kant, Immanuel (1795). "Perpetual Peace: A Philosophical Sketch". Archived from the original on May 14, 2008.
- Kaufmann, Chaim (2004). "Threat Inflation and the Failure of the Marketplace of Ideas: The Selling of the Iraq War". International Security. 29 (1): 5–48. doi:10.1162/0162288041762940. ISSN 0162-2889. JSTOR 4137546. S2CID 57571584.
- Keen, David (2006). Endless War? Hidden Functions of the War on Terror. London: Pluto Press.
- Kegley, Jr., Charles W.; Raymond, Gregory A.; Hermann, Margaret G. (Winter–Spring 1998). "The Rise and Fall of the Nonintervention Norm: Some Correlates and Potential Consequences". The Fletcher Forum of World Affairs. 22 (1): 81–101.
- Kertzer, Joshua D.; Renshon, Jonathan; Yarhi-Milo, Keren (2021). "How Do Observers Assess Resolve?". British Journal of Political Science. 51 (1): 308–330. doi:10.1017/S0007123418000595. ISSN 0007-1234. S2CID 197463343.
- Kinsella, David (2005). "No Rest for the Democratic Peace" (PDF). American Political Science Review. 99 (3): 453–457. doi:10.1017/s0003055405051774. S2CID 146639676.
- Köchler, Hans (1995). Democracy and the International Rule of Law: Propositions for an Alternative World Order. Springer. ISBN 978-3-211-82764-2.
- Lagazio, Monica; Russett, Bruce (2004). "A Neural Network Analysis of Militarized Disputes, 1885–1992: Temporal Stability and Causal Complexity" (PDF). In Diehl, Paul (ed.). The Scourge of War: New Extensions on an Old Problem. University of Michigan Press. ISBN 978-0-472-11395-8.
- Lai, Brian; Slater, Dan (2006). "Institutions of the Offensive: Domestic Sources of Dispute Initiation in Authoritarian Regimes, 1950–1992". American Journal of Political Science. 50 (1): 113–126. doi:10.1111/j.1540-5907.2006.00173.x.
- Layne, Christopher (Autumn 1994). "Kant or Cant: The Myth of the Democratic Peace". International Security. 19 (2): 5–49. doi:10.2307/2539195. JSTOR 2539195. S2CID 60168646.
- Leblang, David; Chan, Steve (2003). "Explaining Wars Fought by Established Democracies: Do Institutional Constraints Matter?". Political Research Quarterly. 56 (4): 385–400. doi:10.1177/106591290305600401. S2CID 153829754. Archived from the original on February 12, 2006.
- LeVeck, Brad L; Narang, Neil (2017). "The Democratic Peace and the Wisdom of Crowds". International Studies Quarterly. 61 (4): 867–880. doi:10.1093/isq/sqx040. ISSN 0020-8833.
- Levy, Gilat; Razin, Ronny (2004). "It Takes Two: An Explanation for the Democratic Peace" (PDF). Journal of the European Economic Association. 2 (1): 1–29. doi:10.1162/154247604323015463. ISSN 1542-4766. S2CID 12114936. Archived from the original (PDF) on January 18, 2005.
- Levy, Jack S.; Thompson, William R. (2011). Causes of War. John Wiley & Sons.
- Lipson, Charles (2003). Reliable Partners: How Democracies Have Made a Separate Peace. Princeton University Press. ISBN 978-0-691-11390-6.
- Lucarelli, Sonia (n.d.). Final Report: Peace and Democracy: The Rediscovered Link: The EU, NATO and the European System Ofliberal-Democratic Security Communities (PDF). NATO. Archived (PDF) from the original on June 26, 2011.
- Mansfield, Edward D.; Snyder, Jack (2002). "Democratic Transitions, Institutional Strength, and War" (PDF). International Organization. 56 (2): 297–337. doi:10.1162/002081802320005496. S2CID 55323505. Archived from the original (PDF) on September 13, 2006.
- Mansfield, Edward D.; Snyder, Jack (2005). Electing to Fight: Why Emerging Democracies Go to War. MIT Press. ISBN 978-0-262-13449-1.
- Maoz, Zeev (Summer 1997). "The Controversy over the Democratic Peace: Rearguard Action or Cracks in the Wall?". International Security. 22 (1): 162–198. doi:10.2307/2539333. JSTOR 2539333.
- Maoz, Zeev; Abdolali, Nasrin (March 1989). "Regime Types and International Conflict, 1816-1976". Journal of Conflict Resolution. 33 (1): 3–35. doi:10.1177/0022002789033001001. S2CID 145537899.
- Maoz, Zeev; Russett, Bruce (September 1993). "Normative and Structural Causes of Democratic Peace, 1946–1986". American Political Science Review. 87 (3): 624–638. doi:10.2307/2938740. JSTOR 2938740. S2CID 144695529.
- Mearsheimer, John J. (Summer 1990). "Back to the Future: Instability in Europe after the Cold War". International Security. 15 (1): 5–56. doi:10.2307/2538981. JSTOR 2538981. S2CID 153793930.
- Mearsheimer, John J (2010). "Why is Europe Peaceful Today?". European Political Science. 9 (3): 387–397. doi:10.1057/eps.2010.24. ISSN 1680-4333. S2CID 141256617.
- Mokyr, Joel; Voth, Hans-Joachim (2010). "Understanding Growth in Europe, 1700–1870: Theory and Evidence" (PDF). In Broadberry, Stephen; ORourke, Kevin H. (eds.). The Cambridge Economic History of Modern Europe: 1700–1870. Vol. 1. pp. 7–42. doi:10.1017/CBO9780511794834.003. ISBN 978-0-511-79483-4. Archived from the original (PDF) on May 20, 2020.
- Mousseau, Michael (2000). "Market Prosperity, Democratic Consolidation, and Democratic Peace". Journal of Conflict Resolution. 44 (4): 472–507. doi:10.1177/0022002700044004004. S2CID 154558655.
- Mousseau, Michael (2002). "An Economic Limitation to the Zone of Democratic Peace and Cooperation". International Interactions. 28 (April): 137–164. doi:10.1080/03050620212100. S2CID 6235007.
- Mousseau, Michael (2002–2003). "Market Civilization and its Clash with Terror". International Security. 27 (3 (Winter)): 5–29. doi:10.1162/01622880260553615. S2CID 26190384.
- Mousseau, Michael (2003). "The Nexus of Market Society, Liberal Preferences, and Democratic Peace: Interdisciplinary Theory and Evidence". International Studies Quarterly. 47 (4): 483–510. doi:10.1046/j.0020-8833.2003.00276.x. S2CID 18258407.
- Mousseau, Michael (2005). "Comparing New Theory with Prior Beliefs: Market Civilization and the Democratic Peace". Conflict Management and Peace Science. 22 (1): 63–77. doi:10.1080/07388940590915327. S2CID 31307288.
- Mousseau, Michael; Shi, Yuhang (1999). "A Test for Reverse Causality in the Democratic Peace Relationship" (PDF). Journal of Peace Research. 36 (6): 639–663. doi:10.1177/0022343399036006003. ISSN 0022-3433. S2CID 36381997. Archived from the original (PDF) on July 17, 2012.
- Mousseau, Michael; Hegre, Håvard; Oneal, John R. (2003). "How the Wealth of Nations Conditions the Liberal Peace". European Journal of International Relations. 9 (4): 277–314. doi:10.1177/1354066103009002005. S2CID 143411095.
- Müller, Harald; Wolff, Jonas (2004). "Dyadic Democratic Peace Strikes Back" (PDF). Paper Prepared for Presentation at the 5th Pan-European International Relations Conference the Hague, September 9–11, 2004. Archived from the original (PDF) on June 25, 2006.
- "Musharraf Moved Nuclear Weapons in Kargil War". The Nation. July 2006. Archived from the original on December 23, 2007.
- Oneal, John R.; Russett, Bruce (1999). "The Kantian Peace: The Pacific Benefits of Democracy, Interdependence, and International Organizations" (PDF). World Politics. 52 (1): 1–37. doi:10.1017/S0043887100020013. S2CID 153557783. Archived from the original (PDF) on October 28, 2005.
- Oneal, John R.; Russett, Bruce (2001). "Causes of Peace: Democracy, Interdependence, and International Organizations, 1885–1992" (PDF). Paper Presented at the 2001 Annual Meeting of the American Political Science Association, San Francisco, CA. Archived from the original (PDF) on September 11, 2006.
- Oneal, John R.; Russett, Bruce (2004). "Rule of Three, Let it Be? When More Really Is Better" (PDF). Revised Version of Paper Presented at the Annual Meeting of the Peace Science Society.
- Oren, Ido (1995). "The Subjectivity Of The 'Democratic' Peace: Changing U.S. Perceptions Of Imperial Germany". International Security. 20 (2): 147–184. doi:10.2307/2539232. JSTOR 2539232. S2CID 153795727. Archived from the original on August 18, 2006.
- Owen, John M (2004). "Democratic Peace Research: Whence and Whither?". International Politics. 41 (4): 605–617. doi:10.1057/palgrave.ip.8800096. ISSN 1384-5748. S2CID 144053631.
- Owen, John M. IV (November–December 2005). "Iraq and the Democratic Peace". Foreign Affairs. doi:10.2307/20031781. JSTOR 20031781. Archived from the original on December 21, 2005.
- Owsiak, Andrew P. (2019). "Foundations for integrating the democratic and territorial peace arguments". Conflict Management and Peace Science. 36 (1): 63–87. doi:10.1177/0738894216650635. S2CID 156163897.
- Page Fortna, Virginia (2004). Peacetime: cease-fire agreements and the durability of peace. Princeton, NJ: Princeton University Press.
- Patten, Chris (1999). "Human Rights Discussion Forum; Speech by The Rt Hon Chris Patten, CH. Plenary Session Brussels – Charlemagne building – 30 November 1999 – SPEECH/99/193".
- Paine, Thomas (1945). Foner, Philip S. (ed.). The Complete Writings of Thomas Paine. New York: The Citadel Press.
- Peceny, Mark; Butler, Christopher K. (2004). "The Conflict Behavior of Authoritarian Regimes". International Politics. 41 (4): 565–581. doi:10.1057/palgrave.ip.8800093. S2CID 144243106.
- Peceny, Mark; Beer, Caroline C.; Sanchez-Terry, Shannon (2002). "Dictatorial Peace?". The American Political Science Review. 96 (1): 15–26. doi:10.1017/S0003055402004203. ISSN 0003-0554. JSTOR 3117807. S2CID 229169370.
- Peceny, Mark; Beer, Carolne C. (2003). "Peaceful Parties and Puzzling Personalists". American Political Science Review. 97 (2): 339–342. doi:10.1017/S0003055403000716. S2CID 145169371.
- Petersen, Karen K. (2004). Laying to Rest the Autocratic Peace. Journeys in World Politics. University of Iowa.
- Poznansky, Michael (2015). "Stasis or Decay? Reconciling Covert War and the Democratic Peace". International Studies Quarterly: n/a. doi:10.1111/isqu.12193. ISSN 0020-8833.
- Pugh, Jeffrey (April 2005). "Democratic Peace Theory: A Review and Evaluation". CEMPROC Working Paper Series. Archived from the original on February 15, 2018.
- Quackenbush, Stephen L.; Rudy, Michael (2006). "Evaluating the Monadic Democratic Peace" (PDF). Paper Prepared for Presentation at the Annual Meeting of the Midwest Political Science Association, Chicago, Illinois, April 20–23, 2006. Archived from the original (PDF) on September 5, 2006.
- Raknerud, Arvid; Hegre, Havard (1997). "The Hazard of War: Reassessing the Evidence for the Democratic Peace". Journal of Peace Research. 34 (4): 385–404. doi:10.1177/0022343397034004002. S2CID 145495178.
- Ravlo, Hilde; Gleditsch, Nils Peter (2000). "Colonial War and Globalization of Democratic Values" (PDF). Paper Presented to the Workshop on 'Globalization and Armed Conflict' at the Joint Session of Workshops, European Consortium for Political Research Copenhagen, 15–19 April 2000. Archived from the original (PDF) on June 25, 2006.
- Ray, James Lee (1995). Democracy and International Conflict. University of South Carolina Press. ISBN 978-1-57003-041-3.
- Ray, James Lee (1998). "Does Democracy Cause Peace?". Annual Review of Political Science. 1: 27–46. doi:10.1146/annurev.polisci.1.1.27.
- Ray, James Lee (2000). Democracy and Peace Through the Ages: According to Spencer Weart. Prepared for delivery at the annual meeting of the American Political Science Association, Washington DC, August 30 – September 3, 2000.
- Ray, James Lee (2003). "A Lakatosian View of the Democratic Peace Research Program" (PDF). In Colin and Miriam Fendius Elman (ed.). Progress in International Relations Theory. MIT Press. Archived from the original (PDF) on June 25, 2006.
- Ray, James Lee (2005). "Constructing Multivariate Analyses (of Dangerous Dyads)" (PDF). Conflict Management and Peace Science. 22 (4): 277–292. doi:10.1080/07388940500339175. Archived from the original (PDF) on April 8, 2006.
- Reiter, D. (2001). "Does Peace Nature Democracy?". Journal of Politics. 63 (3): 935–948. doi:10.1111/0022-3816.00095. S2CID 154824443.
- Reiter, Dan (October 25, 2012), "Democratic Peace Theory", Political Science, Oxford University Press, doi:10.1093/obo/9780199756223-0014, ISBN 978-0-19-975622-3
- Reiter, Dan (January 25, 2017). "Is Democracy a Cause of Peace?". Oxford Research Encyclopedia of Politics. doi:10.1093/acrefore/9780190228637.013.287. ISBN 978-0-19-022863-7. Archived from the original on June 15, 2017.
- Reiter, Dan; Stam, Allan C. (2003). "Identifying the Culprit: Democracy, Dictatorship, and Dispute Initiation". American Political Science Review. 97 (2): 333–337. doi:10.1017/S0003055403000704. S2CID 144246979.
- Reuveny, Rafael; Li, Quan (2003). "The Joint Democracy – Dyadic Conflict Nexus: A Simultaneous Equations Model". Journal of Politics. 47 (3): 325–346. doi:10.1111/1468-2478.4703002.
- Risse, Thomas (n.d.). "Democratic Peace – Warlike Democracies? A Social Constructivist Interpretation of the Liberal Argument" (PDF). vub.ac.be. Archived (PDF) from the original on October 13, 2017.
- Rosato, Sebastian (2003). "The Flawed Logic of Democratic Peace Theory". American Political Science Review. 97 (4): 585–602. doi:10.1017/s0003055403000893. S2CID 17654114.
- Roser, Max (March 15, 2013). "Democracy". Our World in Data.
- Rummel, R. J (n.d.). "Democratic Peace Bibliography Version 3.0". Freedom, Democracy, Peace; Power, Democide, and War. Archived from the original on November 24, 2005.
- Rummel, Rudolph J. (1983). "Libertarianism and international violence". Journal of Conflict Resolution. 27: 27–72. doi:10.1177/0022002783027001002. S2CID 145801545.
- Rummel, Rudolph J. (1997). Power Kills: Democracy as a Method of Nonviolence. Transaction Publishers. ISBN 978-1-56000-297-0.
- Rummel, Rudolph J. (1999). "A Reply to Shimmin". Peace Magazine. 15 (5): 8.
- Rummel, R.J. (October 19, 2005). "CATO and Gartzke Are At It Again". freedomspeace. Archived from the original on September 19, 2008.
- Russett, Bruce (1993). Grasping the Democratic Peace: Principles for a Post-Cold War World. Princeton University Press. ISBN 978-0-691-03346-4.
- Russett, Bruce (1994). Grasping the Democratic Peace: Principles for a Post-Cold War World. Princeton University Press. ISBN 978-1-4008-2102-0 – via Google Books.
- Russett, Bruce (2006). "Thucydides, Ancient Greece, and the Democratic Peace". Journal of Military Ethics. 5 (4): 254–269. doi:10.1080/15027570601037798. ISSN 1502-7570. S2CID 144838597.
- Russett, Bruce; Layne, C.; Spiro, D. E.; Doyle, M. W. (October 1995). "The Democratic Peace: And Yet It Moves". International Security. 19 (4): 164–75. doi:10.2307/2539124. JSTOR 2539124.
- Russett, B.; Oneal, J.R.; David, D. R. (1998). "The Third Leg of the Kantian Tripod for Peace: International Organizations and Militarized Disputes, 1950–85". International Organization. 52 (3): 441–467. doi:10.1162/002081898550626. S2CID 153665709.
- Russett, Bruce; Oneal, John R. (2001). Triangulating Peace: Democracy, Interdependence, and International Organizations. W. W. Norton & Company. ISBN 978-0-393-97684-7.
- Russett, Bruce (2005). "Bushwhacking the Democratic Peace". International Studies Perspectives. 6 (4): 395–408. doi:10.1111/j.1528-3577.2005.00217.x.
- Satana, Nil S. (2010). "Causes and Prevention of Armed Conflicts". In P.Bilgin; P.D. Williams; M. Sekiguchi; J. K. Galbraith; S. T. Inayatullah; J. Wiener; R. A. Schrire; I.L. Murphy (eds.). Global Security and International Political Economy. Vol. 1. United Kingdom: EOLSS Publications. ISBN 978-1-84826-338-3.
- Schmitt, Carl (1985) [1922]. Political Theology: Four Chapters on the Concept of Sovereignty. Translated by Schwab, George. Cambridge: MIT Press.
- Schmitt, Carl (2008) [1927]. The Concept of the Political. 1927. Translated by Schwab, George (Expanded ed.). Chicago: University of Chicago Press. ISBN 978-0-226-73884-0.
- Schultz, Kenneth A. (2001). Democracy and Coercive Diplomacy. Cambridge Studies in International Relations. Cambridge: Cambridge University Press. doi:10.1017/cbo9780511491658. ISBN 978-0-521-79227-1.
- Schwartz, Thomas; Skinner, Kiron K. (2002). "The Myth of the Democratic Peace". Orbis. 46 (1): 159–172. doi:10.1016/s0030-4387(01)00113-2.
- Shimmin, Kevin (1999). "Critique of R. J. Rummel's "Democratic Peace" Thesis". Peace Magazine. 15 (5): 6.
- Slantchev, Branislav L.; Alexandrova, Anna; Gartzke, Erik (2005). "Probabilistic Causality, Selection Bias, and the Logic of the Democratic Peace" (PDF). American Political Science Review. 99 (3): 459–462. doi:10.1017/s0003055405051786. S2CID 11320585. Archived from the original (PDF) on December 25, 2005.
- Small, Melvin; Singer, David J. (1976). "The War Proneness of Democratic Regimes, 1816–1965". Jerusalem Journal of International Relations. 1: 50–69.
- Snyder, Jack; Borghard, Erica D. (2011). "The Cost of Empty Threats: A Penny, Not a Pound". American Political Science Review. 105 (3): 437–456. doi:10.1017/s000305541100027x. ISSN 0003-0554. S2CID 144584619.
- Souva, Mark (2004). "Institutional Similarity and Interstate Conflict". International Interactions. 30 (3): 263–281. doi:10.1080/03050620490492213. S2CID 155016152.
- Spiro, David E. (Autumn 1994). "Give Democratic Peace a Chance? The Insignificance of the Liberal Peace". International Security. 19 (2): 50–86. doi:10.2307/2539196. JSTOR 2539196. S2CID 59478839. SSRN 1398047.
- Steinsson, Sverrir (2018). "Do liberal ties pacify? A study of the Cod Wars". Cooperation and Conflict. 53 (3): 339–355. doi:10.1177/0010836717712293. ISSN 0010-8367. S2CID 157673952.
- Tocqueville, Alexis de (1988). Mayer, J. P. (ed.). Democracy in America. New York: Harper Perennial.
- Tomz, Michael (2007). "Domestic Audience Costs in International Relations: An Experimental Approach". International Organization. 61 (4): 821–40. doi:10.1017/S0020818307070282. ISSN 0020-8183. S2CID 154895678.
- Tomz, Michael R.; Weeks, Jessica L. P. (2013). "Public Opinion and the Democratic Peace". The American Political Science Review. 107 (4): 849–865. doi:10.1017/S0003055413000488. ISSN 0003-0554. JSTOR 43654037. S2CID 8593119.
- Wayman, Frank (2002). "Incidence of Militarized Disputes Between Liberal States, 1816–1992". Paper Presented at the Annual Meeting of the International Studies Association, New Orleans, La., Mar. 23–27, 2002. Archived from the original on April 5, 2008.
- Weede, Erich (2004). "The Diffusion of Prosperity and Peace by Globalization" (PDF). The Independent Review. 9 (2).
- Weart, Spencer R. (1998). Never at War. Yale University Press. ISBN 978-0-300-07017-0.
- Weeks, Jessica L. (2008). "Autocratic Audience Costs: Regime Type and Signaling Resolve". International Organization. 62 (1): 35–64. doi:10.1017/S0020818308080028. ISSN 0020-8183. JSTOR 40071874. S2CID 154432066.
- Weeks, Jessica L. P. (2014). Dictators at War and Peace. Cornell University Press. ISBN 978-0-8014-5296-3. JSTOR 10.7591/j.ctt1287f18.
- Welzel, Christian (2013). Freedom Rising: Human Empowerment and the Quest for Emancipation. Cambridge University Press.
- Werner, Suzanne; Lemke, Douglas (1997). "Opposites Do Not Attract: The Impact of Domestic Institutions, Power, and Prior Commitments on Alignment Choicesl". International Studies Quarterly. 41 (3): 529–546. doi:10.1111/0020-8833.00055. hdl:2027.42/146950.
- Werner, Suzanne (2000). "The Effect of Political similarity on the Onset of Militarized Disputes, 1816–1985". Political Science Quarterly. 53 (2): 343–374. doi:10.1177/106591290005300207. S2CID 154817029.
- White, Matthew (2005). "Democracies Do Not Make War on One Another. ...or Do They?". Archived from the original on December 30, 2005.
- Wilson, T. Woodrow (April 2, 1917). "Message to Congress". Archived from the original on February 22, 2006.
- "Conflict Data Set". Stockholm International Peace Research Institute (SIPRI). n.d. Archived from the original on January 17, 2005.
- "Data". Peter D. Watson Center for Conflict and Cooperation. n.d. Archived from the original on August 27, 2005.
- "No True Scotsman Fights a War". Asia Times. January 31, 2006. Archived from the original on January 5, 2019.
- "U. S. Electoral College: Historical Election Results 1789-1996". www.archives.gov. National Archives and Records Administration. n.d. Archived from the original on July 20, 2017.
- "Global Conflict Trends". Center for Systematic Peace. April 4, 2006. Archived from the original on June 16, 2006.
- "President and Prime Minister Blair Discussed Iraq, Middle East". Office of the Press Secretary, the White House. November 12, 2004. Archived from the original on April 23, 2011.
- "President Thanks U.S. and Coalition Troops in Afghanistan". Office of the Press Secretary, the White House. March 1, 2006. Archived from the original on April 23, 2011.
- "Interview". The Daily Show with Jon Stewart. September 18, 2008.
