= Territorial peace theory =

International relations theory

Proponents of territorial peace theory argue that the stability of a country's borders has a large influence on the political climate of the country. According to them, peace and stable borders foster a democratic and tolerant climate, while territorial conflicts with neighbor countries have far-reaching consequences for both individual-level attitudes, government policies, conflict escalation, arms races, and war.

In particular, the territorial peace theory seeks to explain why countries with stable borders are likely to develop democracy while countries with insecure borders tend to be autocratic.

The connection between peace and democracy has long been recognized, but theorists disagree about the direction of causality. The democratic peace theory posits that democracy causes peace, while the territorial peace theory makes the opposite claim that peace causes democracy.

Since the early 2000s, there has been increasing scientific support for the territorial peace theory and criticism of the democratic peace theory. The territorial peace theory is addressing several weaknesses of the democratic peace theory. In particular, the democratic peace theory is contradicted by the historical observation that countries generally become democratic only after they have established peace with their neighbor countries.

== Direction of causality ==
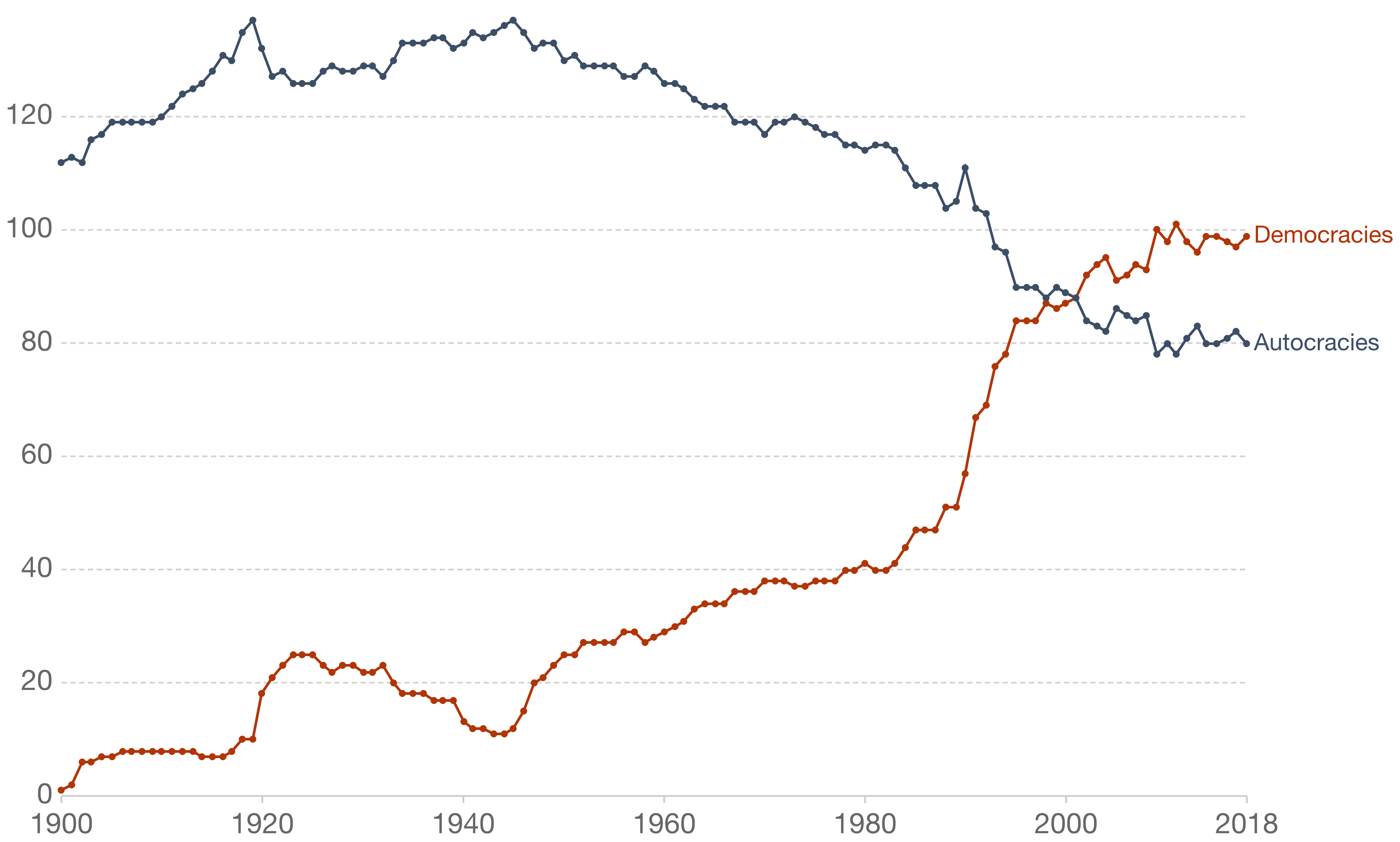
Democracies Autocracies

The causal connection between peace and democracy is a subject of continued debate. It is an open question whether peace causes democracy or whether democracy causes peace. There are also the possibilities that the causality goes both ways in a self-amplifying cycle, or that some third factor causes both peace and democracy.

Historical studies show that countries become democratic only after their borders have been settled. It is very rare that democracy is established before territorial borders have been stabilized, and the few historical cases of democracy before peace have not been stable. This is strong evidence that a causal arrow goes from peace to democracy. In fact, statistical studies show that democracy cannot account for peace between neighbor countries, but peace can account for joint democracy.

Territorial conflicts have a remarkable effect on the attitudes and values of the population. Threats against the territorial borders of a country are observed to provoke a rallying effect in support of the leader and to foster a range of attitudes and behaviors that are antithetical to key democratic values, such as nationalism, authoritarianism, intolerance, and decreased political trust. Such reactions are likely to prevent democratization in countries with unstable borders.

Another indication that the direction of causality goes from peace to democracy is obtained by the use of environment features as an instrumental variable. A rugged terrain is known to increase the likelihood of civil conflict. An observed positive correlation between rugged terrain, intolerance, and lack of democratic values is interpreted as an indication that conflict impedes democracy because the reverse causation from autocracy to rugged terrain can be excluded.

One reason why democratic countries handle disputes with their neighbors more peacefully than non-democratic countries is that they have dispensed with the disputes most likely to involve the use of military force prior to becoming democratic, rather than because of their institutions or norms as the democratic peace theory supposes. In 75% of the country dyads examined in a study, border settlement occurred at least 35 years before that dyad became jointly democratic for the first time.

A possible causality in the opposite direction, from democracy to peace, can be established if we make a distinction between negative peace and positive peace. Negative peace is the absence of war between neighbor countries. Positive peace is an active mutual recognition and cooperation and absence of threats. Positive peace results from high-quality democracy. Transitions from negative peace to positive peace often occur when new governments come to power, and more commonly in democratic states.

Some theorists argue that the correlation between peace and democracy can be explained by a third factor causing both peace and democracy. The capitalist peace theory argues that economic development and markets and interdependence are the true causes of peace, and that democracy is uncorrelated with peace when these factors are accounted for. Another factor during the Cold War was the dominance of the US that fostered peace between democracies in the so-called Pax Americana.

Another possibility is a circular causation so that peace, economic interdependence, democracy, and international organization all mutually reinforce each other in a positive feedback loop. Peace and democracy tend to spread regionally so that clusters of democracies at peace with each other form in areas where borders have been settled and where countries have no reason to threaten each other's borders.

== Theoretical explanations ==
There are several theories seeking to explain why peace comes before democracy. These theories may all supplement each other.

Military explanation. A country with unstable borders needs to build up a large military capability in order to defend its territory against possible attacks from neighbor countries. A large standing army can not only be used for defense against external enemies but also for suppressing internal dissidents. This will enable the leaders to augment their position and repress any rebellion or demands for redistribution of wealth and democratization.

Defense explanation. Individuals in a country with unstable borders will fear displacement from their territory. They depend on a strong state leadership to provide for their protection and security. This creates a rallying effect and support for a strong and authoritarian leader. It has been observed that the citizens in this situation often pay lip service to the ideology of democracy while in fact they support an authoritarian leader.

Psychological explanation. Several psychological studies show that territorial conflicts lead to increased nationalism and intolerance of outgroups, while other kinds of threats have little or no such effect. This intolerance is connected with a less democratic attitude, less support for negotiated compromise with the enemy, less concern about government corruption, and also less tolerance towards other outgroups unrelated to the conflict. This effect is increasing with the degree of attachment to the contested territory.

Evolutionary explanation. The psychological effects of territorial threats have an evolutionary explanation according to regality theory. Humans have evolved a psychological flexibility that make them desire a strong leader, strict discipline, intolerance, xenophobia, and a hierarchical social organization if their social group is threatened by conflict with another group. The opposite tendencies are seen in case of peace and collective security where people desire an egalitarian, democratic, and tolerant society. The construction of a hierarchical society with a strong leader in case of conflicts with neighbor groups benefits the citizens by increasing the social cohesion, suppressing free riding, and improving the capacity for collective action in war and violent conflict. This evolved response pattern explains why territorial conflicts, war, and terror have stronger psychological effects than other kinds of conflict, and why such conflicts lead to authoritarian attitudes and disregard for democracy.

== Reversal to autocracy ==
While the late 20th century has seen large waves of democratization in many parts of the world, we have also seen trends of backlash and decrease in democratic freedoms, especially in the early 2000s. Historical studies of countries that have become less democratic show that these countries are often led by popular leaders who consolidate their power with general support by the population. While the population still supported democracy in principle, they actually desired a more powerful leader and voted for an authoritarian populist. This situation is typically preceded by some external threat – real or imagined – against the country. This observation fits with the theories, explained above, that territorial threats lead to increased authoritarianism and decreased support for democracy.

The threat that makes the population accept a centralization of power and a less democratic system is sometimes deliberately fabricated. There are many historical examples of political leaders who engage in psychological manipulation of their own population through fearmongering, exaggeration of dangers, or even creation of false flag attacks in order to augment their own power. In other cases, the threats are fabricated by foreign powers who engage in psychological warfare and a strategy of tension in order to facilitate an authoritarian coup.

== Criticism ==
Proponents of the democratic peace theory – the theory that democracy causes peace – argue that democracies are likely to use mediation or binding arbitration rather than military force to resolve interstate disputes. Democracies are less likely than autocracies to initiate wars that they are not certain of winning. Studies show that the popularity of the government is decreasing if war casualties are high, as the democratic peace theory predicts. Another study found that the risk of violent conflicts is decreasing when the degree of accountability of a government is increasing. Furthermore, citizens of democracies are significantly less likely to support the use of force against democracies than against autocracies.

Critics further argue that if the territorial peace theory assumes that leaders suppress democracy because they believe that democracy impedes the ability of their state to fight wars, then this in fact confirms that democracies are more peaceful.

Some researchers have even argued that war may lead to a regime change which may pave the way for democratization.

Democratic peace researchers have found that the statistical correlation between peace and democracy remains significant when the correlation is controlled for the effect of border stability, while a rebuttal argues that this applies to non-neighbor states, while the statistics still supports the territorial peace theory for states with shared borders.

Time series analyses show that rivalizing states which are both democratic are less likely to escalate a rivalry to violent conflict. The pacifying effect of joint democracy is increasing over time after both states have transitioned to democracy. These effects of democracy extend beyond war. Democratic dyads are also less likely than non-democratic dyads to threaten, display, or use force against one another.

The territorial peace theory does not explain the observations by the interactive model of democratic peace, which finds influences in the data from both political similarity and democracy.

== Synthesis of democratic peace and territorial peace theories ==
The territorial peace peace theory refers to neighbor countries because they have a shared border that they may fight over. Statistical studies support territorial peace rather than democratic peace when studying only country pairs with shared borders. Joint democracy does not significantly increase peace between neighbor countries until after they have settled their borders.

The situation is different for countries with no shared border. Borders will rarely be an issue between non-neighbor countries. But democracy may improve peaceful relations between countries even if they have no shared border. Democratic countries are more likely to engage in peaceful negotiations and less likely to use threats or force against each other because of shared norms and because voters will often replace warmaking politicians.

This effect of democracy works also for neighbor countries after they have settled their borders. Joint democracy for countries that are already at peace with each other decreases the likelihood of new conflicts, and reduces the severity of militarized disputes and crises if they occur. Therefore, the democratic peace theory is useful for conflicts between countries with no shared border and for countries that are already at peace with each other, while the territorial peace theory is the most relevant theory for neighbor countries with unstable borders. The appearance of joint democracy has no significant pacifying effect in the absence of settled borders.

Democratic leaders are less likely than autocrats to initiate a violent conflict, but after a military confrontation has started, there is little difference between the actions of democratic and autocratic leaders. The peaceful effect of democracy is to some extent offset by the observation that democratic leaders are less likely to retreat in case of military crisis because their popularity will decrease when they lose face.

== Political applications ==
The territorial peace theory has important implications for international relations, global politics, and peace building. If peace and stable borders are preconditions for democracy, then any interventionist peace policy should focus first and foremost on the settlement of territorial conflicts rather than trying to impose democracy on conflict-filled countries.

There have been many attempts to impose democracy on troubled countries with explicit reference to the democratic peace theory. The stated purpose of such interventions was to create peace through democracy. For example, the involvement of the US in World War I, World War II, as well as the Iraq War, were all based on the belief that democracy causes peace.

Interventionist attempts to install democracy by military means have almost invariably failed. The territorial peace theory predicts that military interventions are likely to lead to less democracy, not more, even if the interventions aim at establishing democracy.

In several cases, the democratic peace theory has been used as a justification for initiating a war, rather than the true motive. See the chapter on justification for initiating war under democratic peace theory.

While UN mandates that call for democratic elections after a civil war may be normatively appealing, they are unlikely to be successful. In fact, it has been argued that early elections after civil wars are increasing the likelihood of future conflict because they may lead to suppression of the interests of minority groups.

== See also ==
- Capitalist peace
- Correlates of War
- Democratic peace theory
- Democracy promotion
- Deterrence theory
- Peace and conflict studies
- Peace § Theories
- Peacekeeping
- Steps to war
