= Peter Dinklage on screen and stage =

Filmography

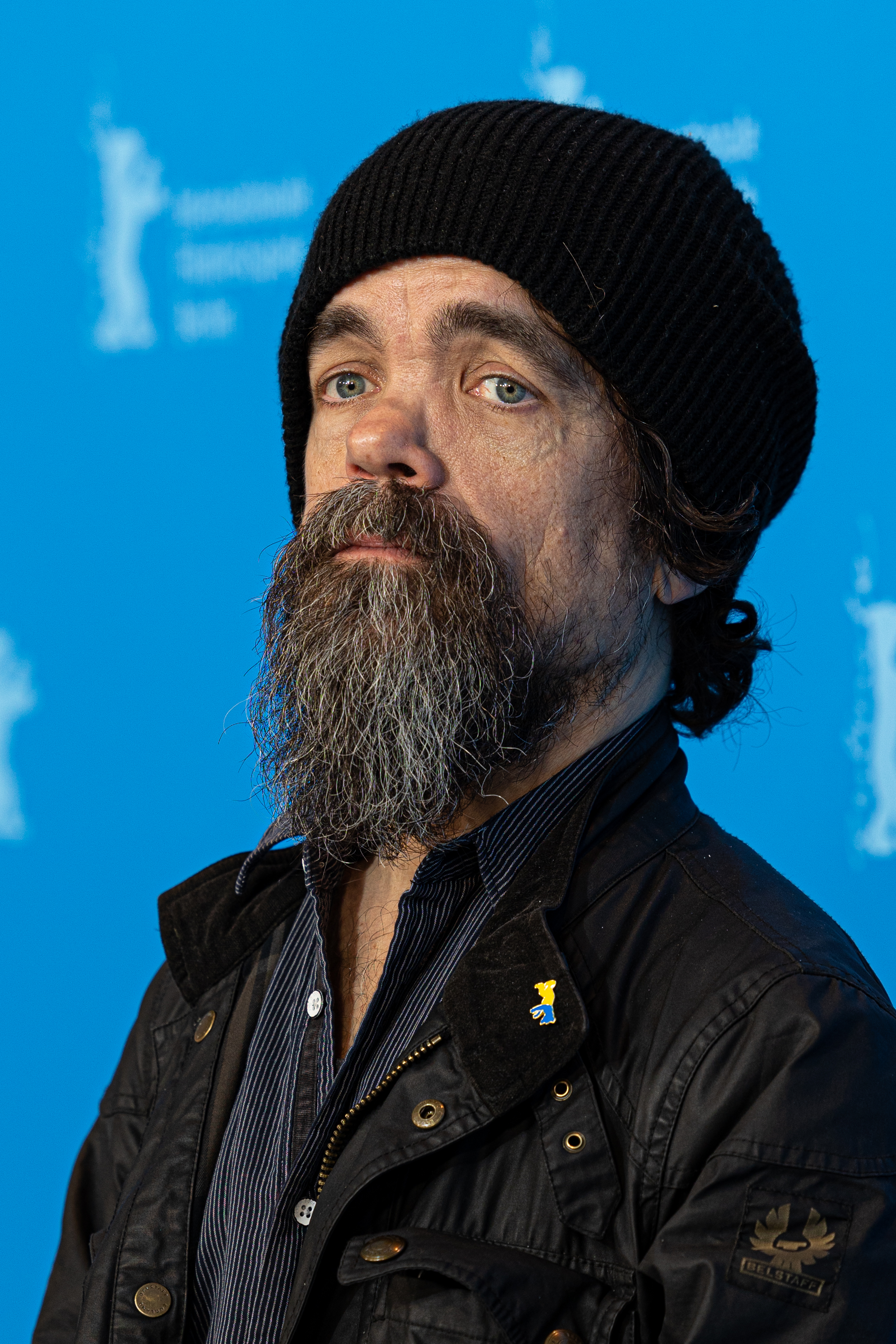
Dinklage attending the 73rd Berlin International Film Festival in 2023

Peter Dinklage is an American actor and producer. He studied acting at the Bennington College where he starred in a number of amateur stage productions. He made his film debut in the 1995 comedy-drama Living in Oblivion. After appearing in a series of supporting parts in much of the 1990s and early 2000s, he made his breakthrough by starring in the Tom McCarthy-directed comedy-drama The Station Agent (2003), which had him play a railroad-obsessed introvert who inherits an abandoned train depot. He was cast in the role by director Tom McCarthy who recalled fondly his appearance in McCarthy's play The Killing Act (1995). For his performance, he received a Screen Actors Guild Award nomination for Best Actor and an Independent Spirit Awards nomination for Best Male Lead. In the same year, Dinklage played the title role in the play Richard III at The Public Theater. He also played a children's book author in the comedy Elf. In 2006, he appeared in the Sidney Lumet-directed crime film Find Me Guilty. He followed with roles in the films Underdog (2007), the British film Death at a Funeral (2007), with its American remake of the same name (2010) and Trumpkin in the high fantasy film The Chronicles of Narnia: Prince Caspian (2008).

He gained international recognition in 2011 with the HBO fantasy drama series Game of Thrones for his portrayal of Tyrion Lannister. As of 2019, Dinklage has received consecutive Primetime Emmy nominations from 2011 to 2019 including four wins for the role as well as one Golden Globe Award. In 2017, Dinklage became one of the highest paid actors on television and earned £2 million per episode of Game of Thrones.

Dinklage provided the voice of Captain Gutt in the 2012 animated comedy Ice Age: Continental Drift, which earned over $877 million—his highest grossing release until Avengers: Infinity War (2018) which grossed over $2 billion. In 2014, he played supervillain Bolivar Trask in the superhero film X-Men: Days of Future Past. The same year, he voiced Ghost in the video game Destiny, but was later replaced by Nolan North. He then starred in the comedy Pixels (2015), The Boss (2016) and the animated comedy The Angry Birds Movie (2016).

== Film ==
Year	Title	Role	Director(s)	Notes	Ref(s)
1995	Living in Oblivion	Tito	Tom DiCillo		
1996	Bullet	Building Manager	Julien Temple	Uncredited	
1998	Safe Men	Leflore	John Hamburg		
1999	Pigeonholed	Roy	Michael Swanhaus		
2001	Never Again	Harry Appleton	Eric Schaeffer		
2001	Human Nature	Dr. Frank Edelstein	Michel Gondry		
2002	13 Moons	Binky	Alexandre Rockwell		
2002	Just a Kiss	Dink	Fisher Stevens		
2003	The Station Agent	Finbar McBride	Tom McCarthy		
2003	Tiptoes	Maurice	Matthew Bright		
2003	Elf	Miles Finch	Jon Favreau		
2004	89 Seconds at Alcázar	Mari Babola	Eve Sussman	Short film	
2004	Jail Bait	Lindo	Ben Sainsbury	Short film	
2004	Surviving Eden	Sterno	Greg Pritikin		
2005	The Baxter	Benson Hedges	Michael Showalter		
2005	Escape Artists	Mr. Duff	Michael Laurence		
2005	Lassie	Rowlie	Charles Sturridge		
2005	Fortunes	Mike Kirkwood	Parker Cross		
2006	The Limbo Room	Dusty Spitz	Debra Eisenstadt		
2006	Find Me Guilty	Ben Klandis	Sidney Lumet		
2006	Little Fugitive	Sam Norton	Joanna Lipper		
2006	Penelope	Lemon	Mark Palansky		
2007	Ascension Day	Brantly	Akosua Busia		
2007	Death at a Funeral	Peter	Frank Oz		
2007	Underdog	Simon Bar Sinister	Frederik Du Chau		
2008	The Chronicles of Narnia: Prince Caspian	Trumpkin	Andrew Adamson		
2009	Saint John of Las Vegas	Mr. Townsend	Hue Rhodes		
2010	Death at a Funeral	Frank	Neil LaBute		
2010	I Love You Too	Charlie	Daina Reid		
2010	The Last Rites of Ransom Pride	Dwarf	Tiller Russell		
2010	Pete Smalls Is Dead	K.C. Munk	Alexandre Rockwell	Also producer	
2011	A Little Bit of Heaven	Vinnie	Nicole Kassell		
2012	Ice Age: Continental Drift	Captain Gutt	Steve Martino & Mike Thurmeier	Voice	
2013	A Case of You	Gerard	Kat Coiro		
2013	Knights of Badassdom	Hung	Joe Lynch	Also executive producer	
2014	Low Down	Alain	Jeff Preiss		
2014	X-Men: Days of Future Past	Bolivar Trask	Bryan Singer		
2014	The Angriest Man in Brooklyn	Aaron Altmann	Phil Alden Robinson		
2015	Taxi	Marc	Kerstin Ahlrichs		
2015	Pixels	Eddie Plant	Chris Columbus		
2016	The Boss	Renault	Ben Falcone		
2016	The Angry Birds Movie	Mighty Eagle	Clay Kaytis & Fergal Reilly	Voice	
2017	Rememory	Sam Bloom	Mark Palansky		
2017	La Vida Nuestra	Chad Johnson	Raúl Arévalo	Short film	
2017	Three Billboards Outside Ebbing, Missouri	James	Martin McDonagh		
2017	Three Christs	Joseph	Jon Avnet		
2018	I Think We're Alone Now	Del	Reed Morano	Also producer	
2018	Avengers: Infinity War	Eitri	Anthony and Joe Russo		
2019	The Angry Birds Movie 2	Mighty Eagle	Thurop Van Orman	Voice	
2019	Between Two Ferns: The Movie	Himself	Scott Aukerman	Cameo	
2020	I Care a Lot	Roman Lynov	J Blakeson		
2020	The Croods: A New Age	Phil Betterman	Joel Crawford	Voice	
2021	Cyrano	Cyrano de Bergerac	Joe Wright		
2022	American Dreamer	Dr. Phil Loder	Paul Dektor	Also producer	
2022	Thor: Love and Thunder	Eitri	Taika Waititi	Deleted scenes	
2023	She Came to Me	Steven Lauddem	Rebecca Miller		
2023	Transformers: Rise of the Beasts	Scourge	Steven Caple Jr.	Voice	
2023	The Toxic Avenger	Winston Gooze / The Toxic Avenger	Macon Blair		
2023	The Hunger Games: The Ballad of Songbirds & Snakes	Casca Highbottom	Francis Lawrence		
2024	Unfrosted	Harry Friendly	Jerry Seinfeld	Cameo	
2024	The Thicket	Reginald Jones	Elliott Lester	Also producer	
2024	Brothers	Jady Munger	Max Barbakow	Also producer	
2024	Wicked	Doctor Dillamond	Jon M. Chu	Voice	
2025	Roofman	Mitch	Derek Cianfrance		
2026	Idiots	Koko	Macon Blair		
2026	Wicker	The Basket Weaver	Alex Huston Fischer & Eleanor Wilson		
2026	Steps †	Roderick	Alyce Tzue & John Ripa	Voice; post-production	
2027	Naughty †	Santa Claus	Olivia Wilde	Filming	
TBA	Lear Rex †	The Fool	Bernard Rose	Post-production	
TBA	Lincoln in the Bardo †	Hans Vollman	Duke Johnson	Voice; post-production	

Key
†	Denotes films that have not yet been released

== Television ==
Year	Title	Role	Notes	Ref.
2001	Oz	Murder Victim	Episode: "Even the Score" (Uncredited)	
2001	The $treet	Little Person	Episode: "Junk Bonds"	
2002	Third Watch	Drug Dealer	Episode: "The Long Guns"	
2004	I'm with Her	Elliot Rosen	3 episodes	
2004	P.O.V.	Narrator	Voice, documentary; Episode: "Freedom Machines"	
2005	Life as We Know It	Dr. Belber	2 episodes	
2005	Entourage	Himself	Episode: "The Sundance Kids"	
2005	Testing Bob	Robinson "Bob" Hart	Pilot	
2005	Celebrity Poker Showdown	Himself	Sixth tournament	
2005–2006	Threshold	Arthur Ramsey	13 episodes	
2006	Ultra	—	Pilot	
2006	P.O.V.	Himself	Episode: "No Bigger than a Minute"	
2006	Nip/Tuck	Marlowe Sawyer	7 episodes	
2009	30 Rock	Stewart LaGrange	Episode: "Señor Macho Solo"	
2011–2019	Game of Thrones	Tyrion Lannister	67 episodes	
2013	Saturday Night Live	Peter Drunklage	Episode: "Melissa McCarthy/Phoenix"	
2013	Sesame Street	Simon	Episode: "Simon Says"	
2014	Mini Monsters	Narrator	Television special	
2016	Saturday Night Live	Himself (host)	Episode: "Peter Dinklage/Gwen Stefani"	
2017	The David S. Pumpkins Animated Halloween Special	Narrator / Adult Kevin	Voice, television special	
2018	My Dinner with Hervé	Hervé Villechaize	Television film; also executive producer	
2021	How to Become a Tyrant	Narrator	Voice, 6 episodes; also executive producer	
2022	Rick and Morty	Chans	Voice, episode: "Rick: A Mort Well Lived"	
2023	How to Become a Cult Leader	Narrator	Voice, 6 episodes; also executive producer	
2023	How to Become a Mob Boss	Narrator	Voice, 6 episodes; also executive producer	
2025	Dexter: Resurrection	Leon Prater	7 episodes	
2025	The Lowdown	Wendell	Episode: "This Land?"	

Key
†	Denotes shows that have not yet been released

== Theater ==
Year	Title	Role	Venue	Ref.
1995	The Killing Act	Tom Thumb	Access Theatre	
2000	Imperfect Love	The Beppo	New York Performance Works	
2002	Evolution	Rex	Bleecker Street Theatre	
2003	Richard III	Richard III	The Public Theater	
2005	Hope Leaves the Theatre	Various roles	St. Ann's Warehouse	
2007	Things We Want	Sty	Acorn Theater	
2015	A Month in the Country	Rakitin	Classic Stage Company	
2018	Cyrano	Cyrano	Terris Theatre	
2019	Cyrano	Cyrano	Daryl Roth Theatre	
2025	Twelfth Night	Malvolio	Delacorte Theater	

== Audio plays ==
Year	Title	Role	Notes
2019	Heads Will Roll	Prince Albert	Audible original
2024	The Mysterious Affair at Styles	Hercule Poirot	Audible original
2025	The ABC Murders	Hercule Poirot	Audible original

== Video games ==
Year	Title	Voice role	Notes	Ref.
2012	Ice Age: Continental Drift – Arctic Games	Captain Gutt		
2014	Destiny	Ghost		
2014	Game of Thrones	Tyrion Lannister		

== See also ==
- List of awards and nominations received by Peter Dinklage
