= List of awards and nominations received by Peter Dinklage =

Peter Dinklage awards and nominations
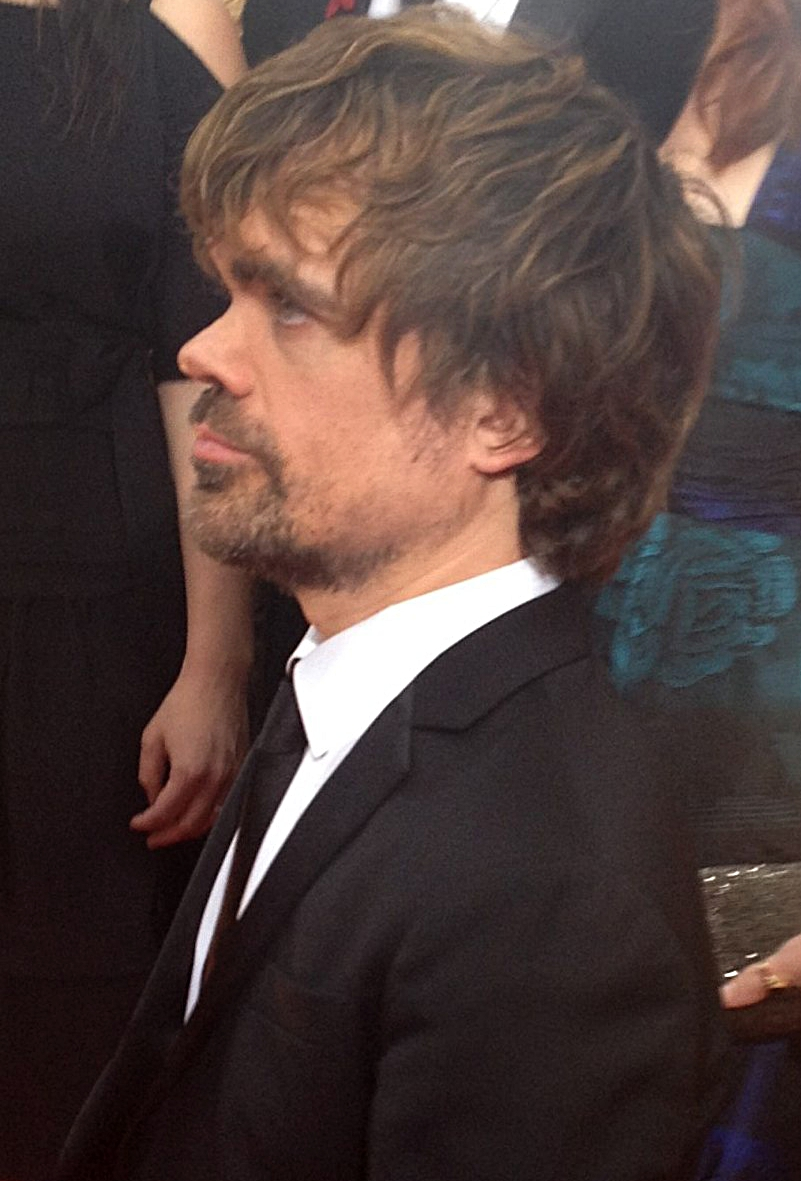
- Dinklage attending the 69th Annual Golden Globes Awards in 2012
Awards and nominations
Award	Wins	Nominations
Capri Hollywood International Film Festival	1	0
Chicago Film Critics Association Awards	0	1
Critic's Choice Awards	1	4
Detroit Film Critics Society	1	2
Empire Awards	1	1
Georgia Film Critics Association	1	1
Golden Globe Awards	1	2
Independent Spirit Awards	0	1
IGN Awards	0	1
IGN People's Choice Awards	0	1
Monte-Carlo Television Festival	0	1
MTV Movie Awards	0	1
Online Film Critics Society	1	2
Portal Awards	0	2
Primetime Emmy Awards	4	9
Television Critics Association Awards	0	2
Seattle Film Critics Society	0	1
Satellite Awards	2	5
San Diego Film Critics Society	0	1
Scream Awards	1	2
Screen Actors Guild (SAG) Awards	2	14
SFX Awards	0	3
Washington D.C. Area Film Critics Association	1	1

Totals (Note: Certain award groups do not simply award one winner. They acknowledge several different recipients, have runners-up, and have third place. Since this is a specific recognition and is different from losing an award, runner-up mentions are considered wins in this award tally. For simplification and to avoid errors, each award in this list has been presumed to have had a prior nomination.)
- Wins: 33
- Nominations: 83

Peter Dinklage is an American actor known for his roles on stage and screen. Over his career he has received several accolades (Note: As of 1995, the year of his very first nomination, American actor Peter Dinklage has won 33 awards from 83 nominations.) including a Critics' Choice Award, four Primetime Emmy Awards, a Golden Globe Award, and two Screen Actors Guild Awards.

Dinklage began his acting career with a role in the 1995 low-budget independent comedy-drama Living in Oblivion. For starring as a quiet, withdrawn unmarried man in the critically acclaimed comedy drama The Station Agent (2003), Dinklage received nominations for the Screen Actors Guild Award for Best Actor and Best Ensemble. The role also earned him nominations for the Chicago Film Critics Association Award and Online Film Critics Society Award for the film. In 2004, Dinklage won his first Satellite Award for Outstanding Talent.

In 2011 Dinklage gained international recognition playing the character Tyrion Lannister in the HBO TV series Game of Thrones. He won a Primetime Emmy and a Golden Globe Award for Supporting Actor in 2011, and garnered consecutive Emmy nominations for the role from 2011 to 2016, with another Emmy win in 2015; he secured a seventh nomination and third win in 2018 and an eighth nomination and fourth win in 2019. The latter nomination made him the only Game of Thrones cast member to receive a Primetime Emmy nomination for each season. He and the rest of the cast were nominated for the Screen Actors Guild Award for Outstanding Performance by an Ensemble in a Drama Series in 2011 and again from 2013 to 2017. Dinklage was also nominated for the Screen Actors Guild Award for Outstanding Performance by a Male Actor each year from 2013 to 2017. He was nominated for the Critics' Choice Television Award for Best Supporting Actor in 2012, 2016 and 2017.

Dinklage played the character Bolivar Trask, a military scientist who creates a range of robots designed to find and destroy mutants, in the 2014 superhero film X-Men: Days of Future Past, for which he was nominated for an MTV Movie Award for Best Villain.

== Major associations ==
=== Critics' Choice Awards ===
Year	Category	Nominated work	Result	Ref.
Critics' Choice Television Awards
2012	Best Supporting Actor in a Television Drama Series	Game of Thrones	Nominated	
2016	Best Supporting Actor in a Television Drama Series	Game of Thrones	Nominated	
2017	Best Supporting Actor in a Television Drama Series	Game of Thrones	Nominated	
2017	Best Acting by an Ensemble in a Movie (Note: Shared with the cast.)	Three Billboards Outside Ebbing, Missouri	Won	
2021	Best Actor	Cyrano	Nominated	

=== Emmy Awards ===
Year	Category	Nominated work	Result	Ref.
Primetime Emmy Awards
2011	Outstanding Supporting Actor in a Drama Series	Game of Thrones (episode: "Baelor")	Won	
2012	Outstanding Supporting Actor in a Drama Series	Game of Thrones (episode: "Blackwater")	Nominated	
2013	Outstanding Supporting Actor in a Drama Series	Game of Thrones (episode: "Second Sons")	Nominated	
2014	Outstanding Supporting Actor in a Drama Series	Game of Thrones (episode: "The Laws of Gods and Men")	Nominated	
2015	Outstanding Supporting Actor in a Drama Series	Game of Thrones (episode: "Hardhome")	Won	
2016	Outstanding Supporting Actor in a Drama Series	Game of Thrones (episode: "No One")	Nominated	
2018	Outstanding Supporting Actor in a Drama Series	Game of Thrones (episode: "The Dragon and the Wolf")	Won	
2019	Outstanding Supporting Actor in a Drama Series	Game of Thrones (episode: "The Iron Throne")	Won	
2019	Outstanding Television Movie (Note: As executive producer)	My Dinner with Hervé	Nominated	

=== Golden Globe Awards ===
Year	Category	Nominated work	Result	Ref.
2011	Best Supporting Actor – Television	Game of Thrones	Won	
2021	Best Actor in a Motion Picture – Musical or Comedy	Cyrano	Nominated	

=== Screen Actors Guild Awards ===
Year	Category	Nominated work	Result	Ref.
2003	Outstanding Male Actor in a Leading Role	The Station Agent	Nominated	
2003	Outstanding Cast in a Motion Picture	The Station Agent	Nominated	
2011	Outstanding Ensemble in a Drama Series	Game of Thrones	Nominated	
2013	Outstanding Ensemble in a Drama Series	Game of Thrones	Nominated	
2013	Outstanding Male Actor in a Drama Series	Game of Thrones	Nominated	
2014	Outstanding Ensemble in a Drama Series	Game of Thrones	Nominated	
2014	Outstanding Male Actor in a Drama Series	Game of Thrones	Nominated	
2015	Outstanding Ensemble in a Drama Series	Game of Thrones	Nominated	
2015	Outstanding Male Actor in a Drama Series	Game of Thrones	Nominated	
2016	Outstanding Ensemble in a Drama Series	Game of Thrones	Nominated	
2016	Outstanding Male Actor in a Drama Series	Game of Thrones	Nominated	
2017	Outstanding Ensemble in a Drama Series	Game of Thrones	Nominated	
2017	Outstanding Male Actor in a Drama Series	Game of Thrones	Nominated	
2017	Outstanding Cast in a Motion Picture	Three Billboards Outside Ebbing, Missouri	Won	
2018	Outstanding Ensemble in a Drama Series	Game of Thrones	Nominated	
2018	Outstanding Male Actor in a Drama Series	Game of Thrones	Won	

== Miscellaneous awards ==
Organizations	Year	Category	Work	Result	Ref.
Capri Hollywood International Film Festival	2021	Best Actor	Cyrano	Won	
Chicago Film Critics Association	2004	Most Promising Performer	The Station Agent	Nominated	
Detroit Film Critics Society	2017	Best Ensemble	Three Billboards Outside Ebbing, Missouri	Nominated	
Detroit Film Critics Society	2022	Best Actor	Cyrano	Won	
Empire Awards	2015	Empire Hero Award	Game of Thrones	Won	
Georgia Film Critics Association	2017	Best Ensemble	Three Billboards Outside Ebbing, Missouri	Won	
Independent Spirit Awards	2003	Best Male Lead	The Station Agent	Nominated	
IGN Awards	2011	Best TV Actor	Game of Thrones	Nominated	
IGN People's Choice Awards	2011	Best TV Actor	Game of Thrones	Nominated	
Monte-Carlo Television Festival	2012	Outstanding Actor in a Drama Series	Game of Thrones	Nominated	
MTV Movie & TV Awards	2015	Best Villain	X-Men: Days of Future Past	Nominated	
Online Film Critics Society	2003	Best Breakthrough Performance	The Station Agent	Nominated	
Online Film Critics Society	2017	Best Ensemble	Three Billboards Outside Ebbing, Missouri	Won	
Portal Awards	2011	Best Supporting Actor	Game of Thrones	Nominated	
Portal Awards	2012	Best Actor	Game of Thrones	Nominated	
Television Critics Association Awards	2011	Individual Achievement in Drama	Game of Thrones	Nominated	
Television Critics Association Awards	2012	Individual Achievement in Drama	Game of Thrones	Nominated	
Seattle Film Critics Society	2017	Best Ensemble	Three Billboards Outside Ebbing, Missouri	Nominated	
Satellite Awards	2004	Special Achievement Award For Outstanding Talent	Peter Dinklage	Won	
Satellite Awards	2011	Best Supporting Actor – Series, Miniseries or Television Film	Game of Thrones	Won	
Satellite Awards	2012	Best Supporting Actor – Series, Miniseries or Television Film	Game of Thrones	Nominated	
Satellite Awards	2014	Best Supporting Actor – Series, Miniseries or Television Film	Game of Thrones	Nominated	
Satellite Awards	2015	Best Supporting Actor – Series, Miniseries or Television Film	Game of Thrones	Nominated	
Satellite Awards	2022	Best Actor in a Motion Picture – Drama	Cyrano	Nominated	
San Diego Film Critics Society	2017	Best Performance by an Ensemble	Three Billboards Outside Ebbing, Missouri	Nominated	
Scream Awards	2011	Scream Award for Best Supporting Actor	Game of Thrones	Won	
Scream Awards	2011	Scream Award for Best Ensemble	Game of Thrones	Nominated	
SFX Awards	2011	Best Actor	Game of Thrones	Nominated	
SFX Awards	2012	Best Actor	Game of Thrones	Nominated	
SFX Awards	2014	Best Actor	Game of Thrones	Nominated	
Washington D.C. Area Film Critics Association	2017	Best Acting Ensemble	Three Billboards Outside Ebbing, Missouri	Won	

== See also ==
- Peter Dinklage on screen and stage
