= James D. Morrow =

American political scientist

- Born: April 12, 1957 (age 68)
- Occupation: professor

James D. Morrow (born April 12, 1957) is the A.F.K. Organski Collegiate Professor of World Politics at the University of Michigan and a member of the American Academy of Arts and Sciences, best known for his pioneering work in noncooperative game theory and selectorate theory.

== Biography ==
Morrow has been a professor of political science at the University of Michigan since 2000. He graduated from the California Institute of Technology with a Bachelor of Science in Mathematics in 1978 and from the University of Rochester with a Ph.D. in Political Science in 1982.

He has had appointments at the Graduate Institute of International Studies in Geneva (as a visiting professor from 2006 to 2007), at the Hoover Institution (as a visiting fellow from 2001 to 2004 and as a senior research fellow from 1989 to 2000), at Stanford University (as a professor from 1996 to 2000), and at the University of Rochester (as a visiting associate professor from 1992 to 1993).

Morrow's research focus on international norms, crisis bargaining, the causes of war, military alliances, power transition theory, links between international trade and conflict, and the role of international institutions in the creation of international law.

In 2014, Morrow was elected to the American Academy of Arts and Sciences. In 1994, he received the Karl Deutsch Award from the International Studies Association. He is a member of the editorial boards of American Political Science Review, International Organization, the Journal of Conflict Resolution, the Journal of Politics, and International Studies Quarterly. He served on the National Science Foundation Advisory Panel for Political Science from 1995 to 1997.

== Publications ==
Morrow has published dozens of articles and essays in peer-reviewed academic journals and edited volumes, and has authored three books.

=== Books ===
Morrow is the author of three books and is a contributor to the International Studies Encyclopedia.

In 1994 he wrote "Game Theory for Political Scientists," published by Princeton University Press which is frequently used as an introductory text for graduate level study of game theory. The book discusses classical utility theory, repeated games and games with incomplete information, focusing specifically on noncooperative game theory and its application in political science.

In 2003 he received the Best Book Award for 2002-2003 from Conflict Processes Section of the American Political Science Association for The Logic of Political Survival co-authored with Bruce Bueno de Mesquita, Alastair Smith, and Randolph M. Siverson. This book was also selected as a CHOICE Outstanding Academic Title for 2004.

Morrow's most recent book, Order within Anarchy: The Laws of War as an International Institution, was published by Cambridge University Press in 2014.

=== Peer-Reviewed Journal Articles ===
- “Retesting Selectorate Theory: Separating the Effects of W from Other Elements of Democracy,” American Political Science Review, 102(2008):393-400; coauthored with Bruce Bueno de Mesquita, Randolph M. Siverson, and Alastair Smith.
- “When Do States Follow the Laws of War?,” American Political Science Review, 101(2007):559-572.
- “Officers King and Zeng and the Case of the Unsupported Counterfactual,” International Studies Quarterly, 50(2007):227-229.
- “Compliance with the Laws of War: Dataset and Coding Rules,” Conflict Management and Peace Science, 23(2006):91-113; coauthored with Hyeran Jo.
- “Selection Institutions and War Aims,” Economics of Governance, 7(2006):31-52; coauthored with Bruce Bueno de Mesquita, Randolph M. Siverson, and Alastair Smith.
- “Testing Novel Implications from the Selectorate Theory of War,” World Politics, 56(2004): 363-388; coauthored with Bruce Bueno de Mesquita, Randolph Siverson, and Alastair Smith.
- “The Laws of War, Common Conjectures and Legal Systems in International Politics,” Journal of Legal Studies, 31(2002): S41-S60. Reprinted in Beth A. Simmons, International Law: Sage Library of International Relations, Vol. 5. Los Angeles: Sage Publications, 2007, 249-266
- “Political Institutions, Policy Choice and the Survival of Leaders,” British Journal of Political Science, 32(2002): 559-590; coauthored with Bruce Bueno de Mesquita, Randolph Siverson, and Alastair Smith.
- "The Institutional Features of the Prisoners of War Treaties," International Organization, 55(2001): 973-993.
- "An Institutional Explanation of the Democratic Peace," American Political Science Review, 93(1999):791-807, coauthored with Bruce Bueno de Mesquita, Randolph M. Siverson, and Alastair Smith.
- "Sorting Through the Wealth of Notions," International Security, 24,2(1999):56-73, coauthored with Bruce Bueno de Mesquita.
- "How Could Trade Affect Conflict?," Journal of Peace Research, 36(1999):481-489.
- "Policy Failure and Political Survival: the Contribution of Political Institutions," Journal of Conflict Resolution, 43(1999): 147-161, coauthored with Bruce Bueno de Mesquita, Randolph M. Siverson, and Alastair Smith.
- "The Political Determinants of International Trade: the Major Powers, 1907-1990," American Political Science Review, 92(1998): 649-661, coauthored with Randolph M. Siverson and Tressa Tabares. Also see "Correction to 'The Political Determinants of International Trade'," American Political Science Review, 93(1999): 931-933, coauthored with Randolph M. Siverson and Tressa Tabares.
- "Capabilities, Perception and Escalation," American Political Science Review, 91(1997): 15-27, coauthored with Bruce Bueno de Mesquita and Ethan R. Zorick. Also see "Reply to 'Military Capabilities and Escalation: A Correction to Bueno de Mesquita, Morrow, and Zorick'," American Political Science Review, 94(2000): 429, coauthored with Bruce Bueno de Mesquita and Ethan R. Zorick.
- "When Do 'Relative Gains' Impede Trade?," Journal of Conflict Resolution, 41(1997): 12-37. Reprinted in a modified version in Gerald Schneider, Katherine Barbieri, and Nils Petter Gleditsch, eds., Globalization and Armed Conflict. London: Rowman & Littlefield, 2003, 49-75.
- "The Struggle for Mastery in Europe, 1985-1993," International Interactions, 22(1996): 41-66, coauthored with Joseph Lepgold and Bruce Bueno de Mesquita.
- "Modelling the Forms of International Cooperation: Distribution Versus Information," International Organization, 48(1994): 387-423.
- "Alliances, Credibility, and Peacetime Costs," Journal of Conflict Resolution, 38(1994): 270-297.
- "Forecasting the Risks of Nuclear Proliferation: Taiwan as an Illustration of the Method," Security Studies, 2(1993): 311-331, coauthored with Bruce Bueno de Mesquita and Samuel S. G. Wu.
- "Arms versus Allies: Tradeoffs in the Search for Security," International Organization, 47(1993): 207-233.
- "When do Power Shifts Lead to War?," American Journal of Political Science, 36(1992): 896-922, coauthored with Woosang Kim.
- "Signaling Difficulties with Linkage in Crisis Bargaining," International Studies Quarterly, 36(1992): 153-172. Reprinted in Michael D. Intriligator and Urs Luterbacher, eds., Cooperative Models in International Relations Research. Norwell, MA: Kluwer Academic Publishers, 245-274.
- "Alliances and Asymmetry: An Alternative to the Capability Aggregation Model of Alliances," American Journal of Political Science, 35(1991): 904-933.
- "Electoral and Congressional Incentives and Arms Control," Journal of Conflict Resolution, 35(1991): 243-263.
- "Capabilities, Uncertainty, and Resolve: A Limited Information Model of Crisis Bargaining," American Journal of Political Science, 33(1989): 941-972.
- "A Twist of Truth: A Re-Examination of the Effects of Arms Races on the Occurrence of War," Journal of Conflict Resolution, 33(1989): 500-529.
- "Social Choice and System Structure in World Politics," World Politics, 41(1988):75-97.
- "On the Theoretical Basis of a Measure of National Risk Attitudes," International Studies Quarterly, 31(1987): 423-438.
- "A Spatial Model of International Conflict," American Political Science Review, 80(1986): 1131-1150.
- "A Continuous-Outcome Expected Utility Theory of War," Journal of Conflict Resolution, 29(1985): 473-502.

=== Other publications ===
- “Security Challenges Facing the United States,” International Connections, 1,2 (Spring 2009): 2-5, Center for International and Comparative Studies, University of Michigan.
- “The US-ROK Alliance: An Asymmetric Alliance over Time,” Korean Journal of Security Affairs, 11(2006):103-121.
- Article on “Game Theory” in The Routledge Encyclopedia of International Relations and Global Politics. London: Routledge, 2005.
- “Diversity through Specialization,” Political Science, 36(2003): 391-393.
- Review of Competition and Cooperation: Conversations with Nobelists about Economics and Political Science, edited by James E. Alt, Margaret Levi, and Elinor Ostrom, Journal of Economic Literature, 39(2001):567-569.
- Articles on “Game Theory” and “Prisoners’ Dilemma” in Routledge Encyclopedia of International Political Economy. London: Routledge, 2001.
- “Political Competition and Economic Growth,” Journal of Democracy, 12(2001):58-72, coauthored with Bruce Bueno de Mesquita, Randolph M. Siverson, and Alastair Smith.
- "IMF Loans Must Be Linked to Reform," Los Angeles Times, April 9, 1999, coauthored with Bruce Bueno de Mesquita and Hilton Root.
- "Measuring Theoretical Progress with a Warped Ruler," American Political Science Review, 85(1991): 923-929.
- Review of The Balance of Power by Emerson M. S. Niou, Peter C. Ordeshook, and Gregory F. Rose, Public Choice, 72(1991): 93-95.
- “Section Introduction: Scientific Study of International Processes,” Vol. 1, pp. clxxvi-clxxviii, in Robert A. Denemark, ed., The International Studies Encyclopedia, coauthored with Paul F. Diehl.
- “Understanding International Conflict: Assessing the Democratic Peace and Offense-Defense Theory,” pp. 170–94, in Ira Katznelson and Helen Milner, eds., Political Science: State of the Discipline. New York: Norton, 2002.
- “The Selectorate Model: A Theory of Political Institutions,” in Joseph Berger and Morris Zelditch, eds., New Directions in Sociological Theory: The Growth of Contemporary Theory. Lanham, MD: Rowman and Littlefield, 2001, coauthored with Bruce Bueno de Mesquita, Randolph M. Siverson and Alastair Smith.
- "Political Survival and International Conflict," pp. 183–206, in Zeev Maoz and Azar Gat, eds, War in the Changing World. Ann Arbor, MI: University of Michigan Press, 2001, coauthored with Bruce Bueno de Mesquita, Randolph M. Siverson and Alastair Smith.
- "The Ongoing Game-Theoretic Revolution," pp. 164–192 in Manus I. Midlarsky, ed., Handbook of War Studies II. Ann Arbor, MI: University of Michigan Press, 2000.
- "Political Institutions, Political Survival and Policy Success," pp. 59–84 in Bruce Bueno de Mesquita and Hilton L. Root, eds., Governing for Prosperity, New Haven, CT: Yale University Press, 2000, coauthored with Bruce Bueno de Mesquita, Randolph M. Siverson, and Alastair Smith.
- "Alliances: Why Write Them Down?," pp. 63–83 in Nelson W. Polsby, ed., Annual Review of Political Science, Vol. 3. Palo Alto, CA: Annual Reviews, 2000.
- "The Strategic Setting of Choices: Signaling, Commitment, and Negotiation in International Politics," pp. 77–114 in David A. Lake and Robert Powell, eds., Strategic Choice and International Relations. Princeton, NJ: Princeton University Press, 1999.
- “The Wages of Peace: Trade, Democracy, Interests and International Conflict Among the Major Powers,” pp. 131–149 in Gustaaf Geeraerts and Patrick Stouthuysen, eds., Democratic Peace in Europe: Myth or Reality? Brussels: Free University of Brussels Press, 1998, coauthored with Randolph M. Siverson and Tressa E. Tabares.
- "A Rational Choice Approach to International Conflict," pp. 11–31 in Alex Mintz and Nehemia Geva, eds., Decision-Making on War and Peace: The Cognitive-Rational Debate. Boulder, CO: Lynne Rienner Publishers, 1997.
- "Leaders, States, and International Politics," pp. 79–101 in Eun Ho Lee and Woosang Kim, eds., Recasting International Relations Paradigms: Statism, Pluralism, Globalism. Seoul: The Korean Association of International Studies, 1996.
- "The Logic of Overtaking," pp. 313–330 in Jacek Kugler and Douglas Lemke, eds., Parity and War: Evaluations and Extensions of The War Ledger. Ann Arbor, MI: The University of Michigan Press, 1996.
- "Bargaining in Repeated Crises: A Limited Information Model," pp. 207–228 in Peter C. Ordeshook, ed., Models of Strategic Choice in Politics. Ann Arbor, MI: The University of Michigan Press, 1989.
- "Moving Forward in Time: Paths Towards a Dynamic Utility Theory of Crisis Decisions," pp. 112–130, in Urs Luterbacher and Michael D. Ward, eds., Dynamic Models of International Conflict. Boulder, CO: Lynne Rienner, 1985.
