= Erica Schmidt =

American theatre director and writer (born 1975)

- Born: 1975 (age 50–51); United States
- Occupations: Theatre director; playwright; screenwriter
- Years active: 1998–present
- Notable work: Cyrano (screenplay)
- Spouse: Peter Dinklage (m. 2005)
- Children: 2

Erica Schmidt (born 1975) is an American theatre director, playwright, and screenwriter best known for writing the BAFTA- and Academy Award-nominated 2021 film Cyrano, based on her 2018 stage musical of the same name. The musical premiered at the Goodspeed. She was nominated for the Las Vegas Film Critics Society Award for Best Adapted Screenplay and the Sunset Film Circle Award for Best Screenplay.

Schmidt has created and directed a number of off-Broadway plays, including Humor Abuse, The Play Company, Lucy, A Month in the Country, Mac Beth (her all-female adaptation of Macbeth) and The Disappear.

In 2001, Schmidt received a Robert and Gloria Hausman Theater Honor from the Princess Grace Foundation.

In 2020, Schmidt received nominations for the Drama Desk Award for Outstanding Director of a Play and Outstanding Revival of a Play for Mac Beth.

== Personal life ==
In 2005, Schmidt married actor Peter Dinklage. Together, they have two children, a daughter born in 2011 and a son born in 2017.
