= Bruce Bueno de Mesquita =

Political scientist (born 1946)

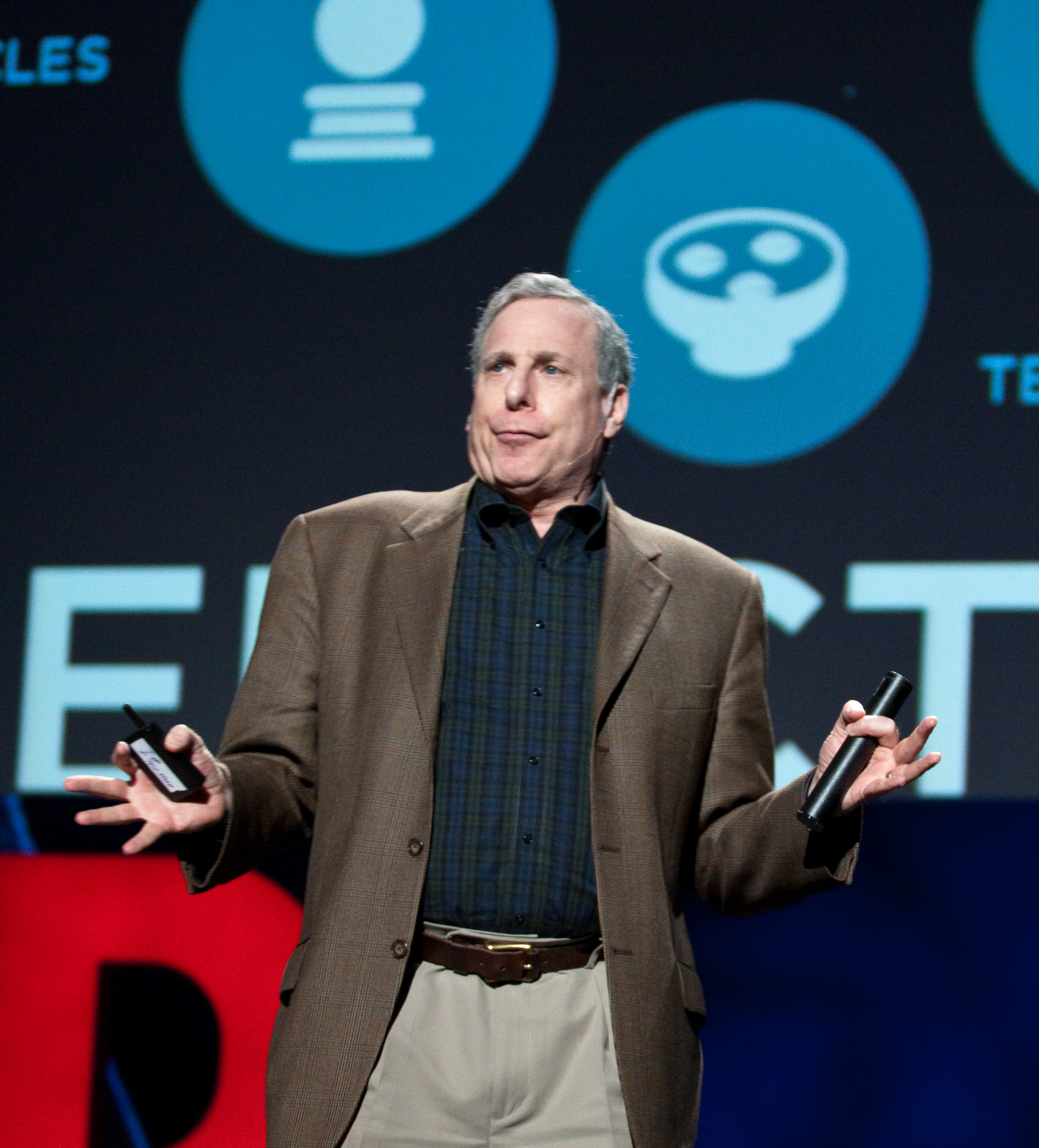
- Born: November 24, 1946 (age 79)
- Citizenship: American

Academic background
- Education: Queens College, New York; University of Michigan

Academic work
- Discipline: Political science
- Institutions: New York University, Hoover Institution
- Notable ideas: Selectorate theory
- Website: https://as.nyu.edu/content/nyu-as/as/faculty/bruce-bueno-de-mesquita.html

Bruce Bueno de Mesquita (/məˈskiːtə/; born November 24, 1946) is a political scientist, professor at New York University, and senior fellow at Stanford University's Hoover Institution.

== Biography ==
Bueno de Mesquita graduated from Stuyvesant High School in 1963, (along with Richard Axel and Alexander Rosenberg), earned his BA degree from Queens College, New York in 1967, and then his MA and PhD from the University of Michigan. He specializes in international relations, foreign policy, and nation building. He is one of the originators of selectorate theory, and was also the director of New York University's Alexander Hamilton Center for Political Economy from 2006 to 2016.

He was a founding partner at Mesquita & Roundell, until that company merged with his other company, Selectors, LLC, that used the selectorate model for macro-level policy analysis. Now, the company is called Selectors, LLC and uses both the forecasting model and the selectorate approach in consulting.

Bueno de Mesquita is discussed in an August 16, 2009 Sunday New York Times Magazine article entitled "Can Game Theory Predict When Iran Will Get the Bomb?" In December 2008 he was also the subject of a History Channel two-hour special entitled "The Next Nostradamus" and has been featured on the 2021 Netflix series How to Become a Tyrant.

He is the author of many books, including The Dictator's Handbook, co-authored with Alastair Smith, and the book The Invention of Power (January 2022).

== Work in forecasting ==
Into the early 2000s, Bueno de Mesquita was known for his development of an expected utility model (EUM), an operationalized application of the expected utility hypothesis from mathematical economics. The model has been successful in predicting the outcome of many political events over a unidimensional policy space. His EUM used Duncan Black's median voter theorem to calculate the median voter position of an N-player bargaining game and solved for the median voter position as the outcome of several bargaining rounds using other ad-hoc components in the process.

The first implementation of the EUM was used to successfully predict the successor of Indian Prime Minister Y. B. Chavan after his government collapsed (this was additionally the first known time the model was tested). Bueno de Mesquita's model not only correctly predicted that Charan Singh would become prime minister (a prediction that few experts in Indian politics at the time predicted) but also that Y. B. Chavan would be in Singh's cabinet, that Indira Gandhi would briefly support Chavan's government, and that the government would soon collapse (all events that did occur). From the early success of his model, Bueno de Mesquita began a long and continuing career of consulting using refined implementations of his forecasting model. A declassified assessment by the Central Intelligence Agency rated his model as being 90 percent accurate.

Since 2005 or so, Bueno de Mesquita developed a superior model, now known as the Predictioneer's Game or PG that forecasts in a multi-dimensional space, uses the Schofield mean voter theorem, and solves for Perfect Bayesian Equilibrium in an N-player bargaining game that includes the possibility of coercion, essentially a greatly generalized version of the two-player game in War and Reason. This model predicts significantly more accurately and does a substantially better job of identifying opportunities that players have to improve the outcome by exploiting uncertainties. The model is documented in A New Model for Predicting Policy Choices: Preliminary Tests, and discussed and applied to examples in The Predictioneer's Game.

Bueno de Mesquita's forecasting model have greatly contributed to the study of political events using forecasting methods, especially through his numerous papers that document elements of his models and predictions. Bueno de Mesquita has published dozens of forecasts in academic journals. The entirety of his models have never been released to the general public.

== Publications ==
- The War Trap. New Haven: Yale University Press. 1981. ISBN 0-300-03091-6.
- Forecasting Political Events: The Future of Hong Kong (with David Newman and Alvin Rabushka). New Haven: Yale University Press, 1985. ISBN 9780300042795. OCLC 11970890.
- War and Reason (with David Lalman). Yale University Press, 1994. ISBN 9780300059229.
- Predicting Politics. Columbus, OH: Ohio State University Press, 2002. ISBN 9780814259849. OCLC 804351067.
- The Logic of Political Survival. Cambridge, Massachusetts: MIT Press. 2003. p. 480. ISBN 0-262-52440-6. (with Alastair Smith, Randolph M. Siverson, James D. Morrow)
- The Strategy of Campaigning: Lessons from Ronald Reagan and Boris Yeltsin. Ann Arbor: University of Michigan Press. 2007. p. 356. ISBN 978-0-472-03319-5. Archived from the original on September 14, 2012. (with Kiron K. Skinner, Serhiy Kudelia, Condoleezza Rice)
- Bueno de Mesquita, Bruce (2009). The Predictioneer's Game: Using the Logic of Brazen Self-Interest to See and Shape the Future. Random House. pp. 272. ISBN 978-1-4000-6787-9. OCLC 290470064.
- The Dictator's Handbook: Why Bad Behavior is Almost Always Good Politics. Random House. 2011. ISBN 9781610390446. OCLC 701015473.
- Principles of International Politics. 2013.
- The Spoils of War: Greed, Power, and the Conflicts That Made Our Greatest Presidents. PublicAffairs. 2016. ISBN 9781610396622.
- The Invention of Power: Popes, Kings, and the Birth of the West. PublicAffairs. 2022. ISBN 9781541768758.

== Family ==
Bueno de Mesquita has three children and six grandchildren. His son, Ethan Bueno de Mesquita, is a political scientist currently serving as dean of the Harris School of Public Policy at the University of Chicago.

== See also ==
- List of Queens College people
