= The Logic of Political Survival =

2003 political science book

- First edition cover
- Author: Bruce Bueno de Mesquita, Alastair Smith, Randolph M. Siverson, James D. Morrow
- Language: English
- Genre: Political Science
- Published: 2003
- Publisher: MIT Press
- Publication place: United States
- ISBN: 9780262025461

The Logic of Political Survival is a 2003 non-fiction book co-written by Bruce Bueno de Mesquita, Alastair Smith, Randolph M. Siverson, and James D. Morrow, published by MIT Press. It formally introduces and develops the selectorate theory of politics.

Paul Warwick of Simon Fraser University wrote that the book is "an extraordinary attempt to answer some very big questions" and "much more than its title suggests" due to its incorporation of other elements related to war, economics, and nation-building. Harvey Starr of the University of South Carolina wrote that due to the copious amounts of material analyzed and presented regarding comparative politics and international relations, it is "Not a quick or easy read". Stephen Knack of the World Bank described it as an "ambitious work", with the concepts of the selectorate and "winning coalition" being the work's "novel contribution".

== Background ==
Each author is in the political science profession, and all have collaborated on several academic papers that introduced the main findings of the book, especially in the years prior to its publication. Bruce Bueno de Mesquita is a political scientist at New York University who is known for his research into conflict theory, his work on political science forecasting models, his consultant work with such forecasting models, and his publications on medieval European history, especially the history of the Catholic Church and Protestant Europe's institutional impact upon the development of the nation state. Alastair Smith is a political scientist at New York University who has written about the effect of institutional incentives on leadership activity, especially in the United Kingdom, and has coauthored a number of articles since the book's publication with Bueno de Mesquita that elaborate on the selectorate theory. Randolph M. Siverson is a political scientist at U.C. Davis, who primarily researches conflict and political institutions. James D. Morrow is a political scientist at the University of Michigan, who primarily studies noncooperative game theory.

== Contents ==
The text is known as the principal document describing the selectorate theory, the first iterations of which were introduced by the book's principal authors in a number of academic papers they collaborated on together in the years leading up to the book's publication. The book proceeds in three parts. Each part is divided into a number of chapters and contains an appendix that elaborates upon the findings of the text. The book describes the means by which incumbent leaders stave off threats to their rule from potential challengers and the effects of incumbents' strategies upon domestic economies and civil liberties. Bueno de Mesquita has described the book's proofs as primarily composed of "calculus."

Part One

Part one introduces the main instrumental variables of the selectorate theory. The selectorate theory posits that each society's nominal population can be decomposed into political institutions that are subpopulations, namely a winning coalition, a selectorate, and the total population, each of which is a subset of the latter. The authors introduce mechanisms by which a leader ascends to power or falls out of power as a consequence of both her performance and her constraints derived from by the institutions previously described. The chapters in this part further detail the effect of institutions on the performance of a country's macroeconomy and, subsequently, the effect of the nation's economy on the international macroeconomy. The authors also contend that the poorest autocracies and the richest democracies are the most stable forms of government. For poor autocracies, the logic is that the vanishingly small odds of being in a challenger's winning coalition encourages members of the winning coalition to remain highly loyal to incumbents. In this institutional arrangement, bribery and kleptocracy flourish while the general economy collapses. For rich democracies, members of the winning coalition have a very high chance of being in a challenger's coalition and discourage loyalty to poorly-performing incumbents. In this institutional arrangement, the health of the economy rapidly improves. Furthermore, the wealth of the economy in rich democracies is abundant in proportion to the total resources of the government, thus eliminating the incentive of either societal elites or the poor to prefer autocracy to democracy.

Part Two

Part two elaborates on the economic implications of the selectorate theory while also elaborating on the effect of domestic institutions on the likelihood of conflict. Regarding conflict, the authors introduce logic describing the attractiveness of war as derivative of the institutional constraints placed on leaders. All leaders are incentivized to reward their backers and may take whatever means needed to retain the loyalty of their necessary backers. The authors describe autocrat's tendency to begin wars that are largely driven by a desire for riches and extractable wealth, while democrats tend to fight wars for policy. The authors also reason that democracies are less likely to fight one another when the two are more equal in capabilities, but find that rich democracies are likely to fight very poor democracies and autocracies. The authors notably find evidence that contradicts the conventional belief that democratic leaders are inherently more pacifistic. The author's findings on the democratic peace are largely derived from their findings in a paper they published three years prior to the publication of their book.

Part Three

Part three describes the effect of a leader's effect on the institutions in her nation. The authors introduce several hypotheses on the effect of leadership activities on population migration, disenfranchisement, purges and coup d'états, as well as detail the means by which regimes can transition from autocracy to democracy. The authors introduce through a number of examples the various ways by which leaders can be deposed. The book concludes with arguments on how peace and prosperity might best be secured given the constraints imposed in the selectorate theory.

The authors additionally discuss Hume's Discourses from Essays, Moral, Political, and Literary and Leviathan and decide that the philosophy in Discourses results in better governance.

== Reception ==
Dale S. Mineshima of the University of Limerick concluded that the book is "well-written", and "poses some interesting points to be further developed". In regards to the latter, due to the potential further research questions posed, Mineshima described it as a "work still in progress". He stated that the usage of mathematical models may intimidate people not with a background in that topic, and that references to other chapters may reducing "clarity" while also "providing continuity"; he argued the latter was therefore "both a strength and a weakness".

Starr stated that the book is "a worthwhile enterprise indeed."

Warwick wrote that " scholars and leaders alike would do well to consider" the "agenda" in the book's last chapter. Warwick stated that some of the experimentation in the book "seems quite perverse" although "it is only to be expected that occasionally fails to convince" due to the "massiveness" of how the book analyzes its information.

Knack wrote that "Cross-country regressions can be informative when carefully designed and interpreted. Given the comparative advantages of the authors, however, this book would have benefited from more Sparta and less statistics."

Choice Reviews concluded that the work is "Pathbreaking and required reading."

== See also ==
- The Dictator's Handbook – Popular press book about the theory written by Mesquita and Smith.
