= Buddhafield (religious movement) =

American religious movement

- Type: New religious movement, cult
- Region: United States
- Founder: Jaime Gomez (also known as Michel Rostan)
- Origin: 1980s West Hollywood, California
- Other name: Aloha Yoga Kula

Buddhafield is a religious movement in the United States. It began in the 1980s in Hollywood, and continues in Hawaii today, often recruiting through yoga studios. The group has been described as a cult by some former members.

== About ==
The leader of Buddhafield is a man previously known as Michel, Andreas, The Teacher, or Reyji, born Jaime Gomez. He was once known to wear nothing but swim briefs and eyeliner. He is featured in the documentary film Holy Hell directed by Will Allen. He is also featured on the Netflix series How to Become a Cult Leader (season 1 episode 3 entitled "Reform Their Minds").

=== Beliefs ===
Buddhafield largely espouses New Age ideas. Jaime Gomez thinks of himself as God, and encourages his followers to think of themselves as God as well. Buddhafield uses the Sanskrit word shakti (meaning "power") for Gomez's alleged power transference to his followers using his finger. Gomez also cites the Bhagavad Gita as a source. Gomez demanded his followers remain celibate despite himself allegedly having sexual intercourse with various followers. Drugs and alcohol were also banned from use while in the group.

Buddhafield followers change names while in the group. Holy Hell director Will Allen explained that "A lot of the principles of the East vs. West that we were doing—surrendering to the guru, dropping your ego, taking your shoes off before you walk into a room and leave the world behind—we didn't think of it as giving our power, we thought of it as empowering." Three to five hour ballet practices two to three days each week were often a part of the group's activities, with members even missing their jobs for practice. The resulting performance was never shown to anyone outside of Buddhafield.

=== Post-Waco changes ===
Gomez voiced his anxieties to his then-follower Will Allen after the Waco siege. Allen pinpoints this as the moment when Gomez's paranoia began. Gomez left his followers for six months to find a new location for the group. Gomez also began to undergo increasing amounts of plastic surgery around this time, as well as recommending his female followers undergo similar procedures. Gomez also attempted to get followers to report on each others' perceived transgressions. He kept one follower from seeing her father before he died, and encouraged another to get an abortion, claiming religious reasons.

== Allegations ==
Many allegations have been made against Jaime Gomez, most notably sexual abuse of his male followers. His victims have said that they had their confessions in their weekly hypnotherapy sessions used against them. Gomez also used the AIDS crisis to instill fear in his gay male followers to frighten them into staying. The group has been described as a cult by some former members.

Former members such as Chris Johnston, Julian Goldstein, Radhia Gleis, and Alessandra Burenin claim they were brainwashed by Jaime Gomez. Allen and other former Buddhafield members claim that they were not allowed to obtain information from outside sources, with Gomez bristling at one member purchasing a television.

Gomez shunned such ex-followers and denied the allegations.

== Reaction to film ==
Jaime Gomez has allegedly sent followers to Holy Hell's Sundance Film Festival debut screenings to "physically threaten" ex-followers featured in the film. One of Gomez's bodyguards allegedly threatened a cast member after Sundance.

Gomez's official statement is as follows:

It is heartbreaking to see how history has been rewritten. Holy Hell is not a documentary, rather, it is a work of fiction designed to create drama, fear and persecution; that is what sells. I am saddened by this attempt to obscure the message of universal love and spiritual awakening. It is devastating to see these friends, who were once so filled with love for the world, become so angry. I wish them only the best, and hold each one close to my heart. If any of my actions were a catalyst for their disharmony, I am truly sorry. May all beings find peace, Michel.
