= The Dictator's Handbook =

2011 non-fiction book by Bruce Bueno de Mesquita and Alastair Smith

- Author: Bruce Bueno de Mesquita; Alastair Smith
- Cover artist: Brent Wilcox
- Language: English
- Subject: Political science, Social theory
- Publisher: PublicAffairs
- Publication date: September 1, 2011
- Publication place: United States
- Media type: Print (hardcover)
- Pages: 319
- ISBN: 978-1-61039-044-6; 978-1-61039-045-3 (eBook)
- Dewey Decimal: 303.3/4
- LC Class: JC330.3 .B84 2011

The Dictator's Handbook: Why Bad Behavior is Almost Always Good Politics is a 2011 non-fiction book by Bruce Bueno de Mesquita and Alastair Smith, published by the company PublicAffairs. It discusses how politicians gain and retain political power.

Bueno de Mesquita is a fellow at the Hoover Institution. His co-writer is also an academic, and both are political scientists.

Michael C. Moynihan reviewing the book for The Wall Street Journal stated that the writing style is similar to that of Freakonomics. Moynihan added that the conclusions the book makes originate from the fields of economics, history, and political science, leading him to call the authors "polymathic".

Mesquita and Smith, with other authors, previously wrote about the "selectorate" theory in the academic book The Logic of Political Survival.

The Netflix series How to Become a Tyrant is partly based on this book.

== Contents ==
Bueno de Mesquita and Smith argue that politicians, regardless of whether they are in authoritarian dictatorships or in democracies, must stay in power by pleasing a core inner circle of power brokers, and that politicians must engage in self-interested behavior in order to stay in power. They argued that the motives of politicians are "To come to power, to stay in power and, to the extent that they can, to keep control over money." The main difference between the scenarios of democratic and authoritarian politicians is that democratic politicians have to please a large number of power brokers and/or the public at large while authoritarian ones please relatively small circles. These are referred to as large coalition governments and small coalition governments. These differences are illustrated in the infrastructure developed in authoritarian and democratic societies. In addition, authoritarian rulers, due to their smaller circles of power brokers, tend to have longer periods of power. The authors also stated that politicians usually do beneficial acts when these acts benefit them or when they must do the acts. The book also argues that aid to third-world countries benefits authoritarian governments, though it can be reformed to help those who need it.

Occasionally terminologies differ in sections of the book. Samuel Brittan of the Financial Times argued that this is sometimes confusing.

== Reception ==
Martin Patriquin of Maclean's wrote that the authors "make a frightfully good argument by turning an old cliché on its ear. Power doesn’t corrupt. Rather, power inevitably attracts the corrupted."

Ed Howker of The Guardian stated that the book assumes all politicians act rationally, and that its attitude was so cynical "that it made me flinch on more than one occasion." He added that "it's good to read the evidence" of how authoritarian governments and systems operate.

Moynihan wrote that the book "contains many points that are common-sensical". Moynihan added that there are some minor errors in fact in the book due to its large scope.

Brittan wrote that it is "most illuminating in the cases of dictatorships in the developing world or highly imperfect democracies such as Russia or Iran."

Theodore McLauchlin of the University of Montreal concluded that it is a "serviceable introduction" and "bracing book that does indeed connect the dots across a wide array of political phenomena." McLauchlin criticized what he perceived were the book's failure to define what a "winning coalition" and "selectorate" are and other issues in the analysis.

== Publication history ==
- The Dictator's Handbook (1st ed.). PublicAffairs. September 1, 2011. ISBN 978-1-61039-044-6.
- The Dictator's Handbook (2nd ed.). PublicAffairs. April 26, 2022. ISBN 9781541701366.
