= Selectorate theory =

Political theory that examines coalitions, political survival and economy in democracy

The selectorate theory is a theory of government that studies the interactive relationships between political survival strategies and economic realities. It is first detailed in The Logic of Political Survival, authored by Bruce Bueno de Mesquita of New York University (NYU), Alastair Smith of NYU, Randolph M. Siverson of UC Davis, and James D. Morrow of the University of Michigan. In subsequent years the authors, especially Bueno de Mesquita and Smith, have extended the selectorate theory in various other policy areas through subsequent academic publishings and books. The theory is applicable to all types of organizations with leadership, including (among others) private corporations and non-state actors.

The theory is known for its use of continuous variables to classify regimes by describing the ratios of coalitions within the total population. Regimes are classified on a spectrum of coalition size, as opposed to conventional, categorical labels (for example, the authors define conventional democracy as a large coalition regime and autocracy as a small coalition regime). The theory has been applied to a large range of topics including foreign aid, the choice of tax rates by incumbent political leaders, as well as medieval European history.

== Postulates ==
Bueno de Mesquita makes several assumptions in his theory:

- Leaders want to hold on to power for as long as they can.
- Leaders require a sufficient number of supporters to have power. Laws, titles, and family lineage mean nothing if the leader doesn't have sufficient support.
- Supporters expect some sort of reward for their support and will abandon the leader if not satisfied.

== Overview ==
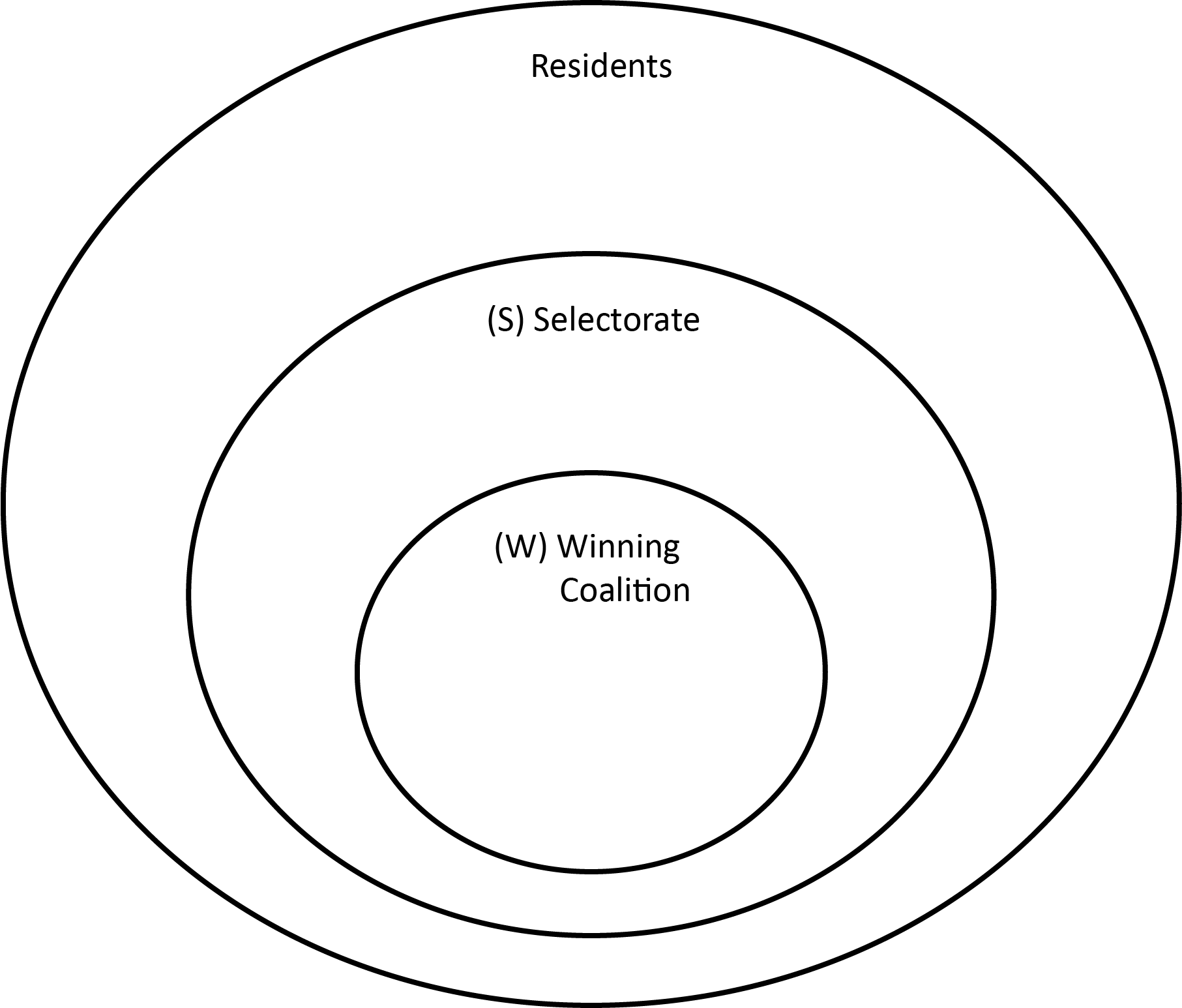
A simple Euler diagram of the basic model of Selectorate Theory. Note that the area within residents and outside selectorate are the "disenfranchised"

In selectorate theory, three groups of people constrain leaders. These groups are the nominal selectorate, the real selectorate, and the winning coalition. The nominal selectorate, also referred to as the interchangeables, includes every person who has some say in choosing the leader (for example, in an American presidential election, this is all registered voters). The real selectorate, also referred to as the influentials, are those who really choose the leaders (for example, in an American presidential election, the people who cast a vote for one of the candidates). The winning coalition, also referred to as the essentials, are those whose support translates into victory (for example, in an American presidential election, those voters that get a candidate to 270 Electoral College votes). In other countries, leaders may stay in power with the support of much smaller numbers of people, such as senior figures in the security forces, and business oligarchs, in contemporary Russia.

The fundamental premise in selectorate theory is that the primary goal of a leader - regardless of secondary policy concerns - is to remain in power. To remain in power, leaders must retain support from every member essential to the success of their winning coalition. When the winning coalition is small, as in autocracies, the leader will tend to use private goods to satisfy the coalition. When the winning coalition is large, as in democracies, the leader will tend to use public goods to satisfy the coalition.

In The Dictator's Handbook, Bueno de Mesquita and Smith state five rules that leaders should use to stay in power:

1. The smaller the winning coalition, the fewer people to satisfy to remain in control.
2. The larger the selectorate, the easier it is to replace dissenters in the winning coalition.
3. Extract as much wealth as you can from the population without provoking a rebellion or an economic recession.
4. Give your essential supporters just enough rewards to keep them loyal.
5. The remaining funds are yours to spend at your discretion, but do not give your essential supporters extra rewards or they will grow too independent and become a threat.

== Distribution of goods ==
In the selectorate theory, incumbents retain the loyalty of their winning coalition provided they can outcompete any challenger. Incumbents induce this loyalty by offering the members of their winning coalition a mix of public and private goods. A public good is a non-excludable good such as national defense or clean water. A private good is an excludable good, such as luxury items but especially currency. Because public goods are non-excludable, they are enjoyed by all members of the nominal population while private goods are enjoyed only by the members of the winning coalition.

Selectorate theory predicts that the ratio of the winning coalition (W) to the selectorate (S) influences leaders' spending habits, particularly their optimal expenditures of both private and public goods. A leader's loyalty norm is the ratio of W/S and measures the chance any member of the selectorate has of being in the winning coalition of the next regime. Loyalty norms closer to 0 indicate higher loyalty of the winning coalition to the leader since members of the winning coalition have a higher probability (modeled as 1-W/S) to be excluded from a future coalition and hence lose their private goods. Loyalty norms closer to 1 incentivize leaders to spend more on public goods and less on private goods, while loyalty norms closer to 0 incentivize leaders to spend less on public goods and more on private goods. Loyalty norms between 1 and 0 offer incentives to mix spending on public goods and private goods. The reason for such allocations is that public goods are a cheaper way to satisfy large winning coalitions (per member of the winning coalition), while private goods are a cheaper way to satisfy small winning coalitions. In all cases, goods expenditures are subject to a budget constraint provided by total revenue (R) and any revenue left over goes to the leader.

Selectorate theory can be used to derive the spending habits of organizations, including nations and private organizations. Virtually all organizations spend money on both public and private goods. For countries with large winning coalitions, meaning democracies, leaders spend more on public goods such as infrastructure, education, and regulatory agencies while in countries with small winning coalitions, meaning dictatorships, leaders spend more on private goods such as money transfers and luxury items. However, democracies still provide private goods, such as free healthcare, while dictatorships still provide public goods, such as national defense.

Calculating the amount of revenue the leader needs to spend to keep any member of the winning coalition loyal is done with the following formula:

${\rm Payout}=(W/S)\times(R/W) + (1-W/S)\times(0)$

This formula is in an expanded form for better illustration. Each member of the winning coalition can expect to earn a proportional share of the revenue, illustrated by the (R/W) term, if they are successfully in the next winning coalition. The chances of this are effectively the loyalty norm, illustrated by the (W/S) term. If they fail to be in the winning coalition they will receive none of the revenue. The chances of this are illustrated with the (1-W/S) term. Leaders therefore only have to spend any amount above the expected payout to keep the members loyal. The amount a leader can keep is ${\rm Leader}=R-W\times{\rm Payout}$.

As the loyalty norm becomes weaker, the payout needed for each member of the winning coalition becomes higher. At some point the payout becomes so high that a leader is better off providing public goods which can be used by any member of the winning coalition as opposed to private goods such as direct payouts or corruption. Following this, governments should perform better when they have weak loyalty norms visible through higher levels of economic growth, lower levels of state predation, but much shorter lifespans. In democracies, which have incredibly weak loyalty norms, leaders last incredibly briefly, sometimes changing each election cycle. This mechanism is used to explain why even well performing leaders in democracies spend less time in office than dictators with horrible performance.

== Government types, leaders, and challenger threats ==
According to the selectorate theory, a leader has the greatest chance of political survival when the selectorate is large and the winning coalition is small, which occurs in an autocracy. This is because those who are in a winning coalition can easily be replaced by other members of the selectorate who are not in the winning coalition. Thus, the costs of defection for those members of the winning coalition can be potentially large, namely the loss of all private goods. The chances of a challenger in replacing the leader are smallest in such an autocratic system since those in the winning coalition are unlikely to defect. The ratio of private to public goods as payoff to the winning coalition is the highest in such a system.

A monarchy, where the selectorate is small and the winning coalition is even smaller, provides a challenger with a greater opportunity to overthrow the current leader. This is because the proportion of selectorate members who are also in the winning coalition is relatively large. That is, if a new leader comes to power, chances are a given member of the winning coalition will remain within the coalition. The incentive for defection to attain a greater amount of goods offered by a challenger is not, in this case, outweighed by the risk of not being included in the new winning coalition. Here, the proportion of private goods in relation to public goods is seen declining.

A scenario in which both the winning coalition is large and the selectorate is even larger provides the least amount of stability to a leader’s occupancy of power; such a system is a democracy. Here, the proportion of public goods outweighs private goods simply because of the sheer size of the winning coalition; it would be far too costly to provide private goods to every individual member of the winning coalition when the benefits of public goods would be enjoyed by all. Because of this fact—that the leader cannot convince winning coalition members to remain loyal through private good incentives, which are in turn cost-restrictive—the challenger poses the greatest threat to the incumbent. This degree of loyalty to the incumbent leader, whatever the government structure may be, is called the loyalty norm.

=== Case study: Russia ===
Joseph Stalin held more power over the Russian people than the tsars before him because the Soviet Union was a large-selectorate system. Under the tsar, only aristocrats could serve in senior government positions, but the communists abolished the aristocracy and made all Russians equal in principle. This allowed Stalin to appoint anyone he pleased to positions of influence. Nikita Khrushchev, for example, came from a peasant background. Stalin's subordinates were therefore very submissive because they knew he could easily replace any of them.

=== Case study: Iran ===
Dena Motevalian implemented the selectorate theory on the power structure of the Iranian regime. Motevalian analyzes how Iran's ruling coalitions have functioned since the 1979 revolution. She argues that he Iranian factions interact under the leadership of the Supreme Leader by balancing competing groups, has helped the Islamic Republic to remain stable despite internal divisions and external pressures. The Supreme Leader manages the "winning coalition", a coalition that is essential to secure the regime preservation.

After the Iranian Revolution, the regime developed several coalitions, each with its own base of support:

The pragmatists focus on governance, economic development, and moderate policies.

The radicals emphasize strict revolutionary values and resistance to western influence.

The conservatives uphold traditional religious values and social norms.

Each coalition has slightly different ideological priorities but remains part of the broader ruling system. This division reduces the chance of a unified opposition takeover.

The Supreme Leader mediates between these coalitions and control them, thus preventing any one faction from becoming too dominant or too weak. This balancing act helps the regime absorb internal differences and to channel competition within the system rather than letting it to develop into rebellion.

== Implications of the selectorate theory ==
=== Foreign Aid ===
Bueno de Mesquita and Smith further applied the selectorate theory to the field of foreign aid. They propose that foreign aid is given to improve the survival of political leaders in both donor and recipient states, but not to help the people of recipient states. Bueno de Mesquita and Smith argue that the size of leader's winning coalition and government revenues affect leader's decision making on policy concession and aid. By analyzing the bilateral aid transfers by Organisation for Economic Co-operation and Development (OECD) nations between 1960 and 2001, they discovered that leaders in aid recipient countries are more likely to grant policy concession for donors when the winning coalition is small because leaders with small winning coalitions can easily reimburse supporters for their concession (such as dictatorial Egypt’s domestically unpopular but internationally desirable normalisation of relations with Israel). As a result, relatively poor, small coalition systems are most likely to get aid, and large coalition systems are least likely to get aid but will get larger aid flows when they do get aid. The conclusion of their study shows that interest exchange is the primary reason for foreign aid practice and OECD members have little humanitarian motivation for aid giving. Nancy Qian's study supported this conclusion by arguing that “The literature shows that the primary purpose of aid is often not to alleviate poverty and that out of all of the foreign aid flows, only 1.69% to 5.25% are given to the poorest twenty percent of countries in any given year"

== Criticism ==
US political scientist Jessica L.P. Weeks argues that selectorate theory makes flawed assumptions about authoritarian regimes. First, she writes that selectorate theory is wrong in presuming that members of small winning coalitions stand to lose their power if the ruler loses power (she notes that these elites usually have independent sources of power and derive their status from seniority and/or competence). Second, she argues that selectorate theory is wrong in assuming all actors perceive the world in the same way (she notes that different authoritarian regime types should systematically lead to different perceptions by the leaders which would affect the kinds of predictions that selectorate theory can make).

== In popular culture ==
The Dictator's Handbook was adapted and condensed into a two-part series on YouTube by American creator CGP Grey in 2016.
