= How to Become a Cult Leader =

2023 Netflix docuseries concerning cults

- Genre: Documentary
- Narrated by: Peter Dinklage
- Original language: English
- No. of episodes: 6 episodes

Production
- Executive producer: Peter Dinklage

Original release
- Network: Netflix
- Release: July 28, 2023

Related
- How to Become a Tyrant; How to Become a Mob Boss

How to Become a Cult Leader is a television documentary series released on Netflix which examines how cult leaders recruit followers and control all aspects of their lives.

== Synopsis ==
How to Become a Cult Leader is narrated by Peter Dinklage and looks "inside the cult leader's playbook for achieving unconditional love, endless devotion and the power to control people's minds, bodies and souls."

The series consisted of six episodes of between 30 and 34 minutes, with each episode featuring a different cult, and highlighting the historic use of one of the six rules the series claims is needed to form a successful cult. The episodes are:

1. Build Your Foundation (Charles Manson)
2. Grow Your Flock (Jim Jones)
3. Reform Their Minds (Jaime Gomez)
4. Promise Eternity (Marshall Applewhite)
5. Control Your Image (Shoko Asahara)
6. Become Immortal (Sun Myung Moon)

== Release ==
The series released July 28, 2023.

== Reception ==
Richard Roeper writing for the Chicago Sun-Times said "The series is fascinating in that aspect, of culling together so many common traits of these insane sociopaths" yet he was put off by its style, saying that "No subject matter should be off-limits to satire, but the juxtaposition between the upbeat, tongue-in-cheek narration ... and the straightforward documentary visuals comes across as tone-deaf and snarky." He was disappointed that there was barely mention of "the current-day political and social media climate, where conspiracy theories and cult-like devotion to certain leaders abound." Roeper concluded "Although it didn't work for me, I want to make it clear there was no point when I felt as if the filmmakers were glorifying these horrible ghouls; in the final episode, we see graphics noting that Manson died in jail, Jones committed suicide, Gomez was exiled, Applewhite committed suicide and Asahara was executed. Turns out the cult leader's playbook is a surefire recipe for complete and utter disaster."

Writing for Glamour, former Children Of God 'sex cult' member Bexy Cameron reviewed the series with an insider perspective on the subject, and centered her article on how this subject pertains to women, who she says are "at the most risk of coercive control." She says "Strip it back, and it is coercive control that is what really makes a cult. Without it, it's just beliefs." She writes "The bones of cults are patriarchal, the structure needs someone (usually women) to be vulnerable." Cameron also tackles the question "Do women have what it takes to start a cult?" concluding that "When you look at the psychological makeup of most cult leaders, two things in abundance are: narcissism and megalomania, but only 25% of people with narcissistic personality disorder are women, so already the odds are against you." Cameron concludes "enjoy the show, but burn the Playbook after reading. (Please, We do not need more cult leaders.)"

The Hollywood Reporter wrote that How to Become a Cult Leader is "a follow-up in tone, style and structure to 2021's How to Become a Tyrant" in that it follows the tongue-in-cheek format used in Tyrant of instructing viewers on how to achieve cult leader status. Regarding the final episode's attempt to summarize its thesis, the Reporter says that was disappointing because there was no "call to action", such as including information provided on cult awareness networks or deprogramming organizations. The review also decried the omission of episodes on L. Ron Hubbard or Donald Trump speculating that those would result in lawsuits and outrage on Truth Social," and said the series "makes dark subject matter occasionally fun, but it might owe its audience slightly more.

Decider reported that the series "unveils a morbid guidebook for those who are fascinated by the villainy of famous cult leaders and want to know the nitty-gritty details of how they operate. In the process, the series will challenge everything viewers know about the topic and hook even those most critical of the genre." The review concludes "The true crime genre clearly has plenty more gas in the tank, but, How to Become A Cult Leader stealthily argues, it might be time to get out of the car."

Reason wrote that the series is "a cheeky and comedic step-by-step guide to becoming the next Jim Jones" and that "The comedy is well-executed, but it obscures the darkness in these stories." The review also says that the series "does show how cults prey on vulnerable people and try to scrape away their individuality. But it doesn't pause to acknowledge the very unfunny truth that plenty of people are willing to believe the most outlandish ideas without much in the way of imposed control."
