= How to Become a Tyrant =

2021 documentary television series

- Genre: Docu-series
- Inspired by: The Dictator’s Handbook: Why Bad Behavior is Almost Always Good Politics
- Narrated by: Peter Dinklage
- Original language: English
- No. of seasons: 1
- No. of episodes: 6

Production
- Executive producers: David Ginsberg; Jake Laufer; Jonas Bell Pasht; Peter Dinklage; Jonah Bekhor
- Producers: Kellen Hertz; Brad Saunders; Rachel Elder; Marianna Yarovskaya; Calvin Singh; Alex Wismer; Paul Dektor
- Running time: 25‑30 minutes
- Production companies: Citizen Jones, Estuary Films

Original release
- Network: Netflix
- Release: July 9, 2021

Related
- How to Become a Cult Leader; How to Become a Mob Boss

How to Become a Tyrant is a Netflix docu-series narrated by Peter Dinklage. It is partly based on the 2011 non-fiction book The Dictator’s Handbook: Why Bad Behavior is Almost Always Good Politics.

It was followed by another series using the same format, also narrated by Dinklage, called How to Become a Cult Leader, which was released on 28 July 2023.

On 14 November 2023, How to Become a Mob Boss was released.

== Plot ==
The narrator states that everybody wants absolute power to transform society to their liking and proceeds to explain how such power can be obtained and sustained. The docu-series proceeds to analyze biographies of historical dictators Adolf Hitler, Saddam Hussein, Idi Amin, Joseph Stalin, Muammar Gaddafi and the Kim family.

== Cast ==
- Peter Dinklage as narrator
- Waller Newell as commentator

== Episodes ==
No.	Title	Featured dictator	Runtime	Original release date
1	"Seize Power"	Adolf Hitler	30 min	July 9, 2021
2	"Crush Your Rivals"	Saddam Hussein	27 min	July 9, 2021
3	"Reign Through Terror"	Idi Amin	27 min	July 9, 2021
4	"Control the Truth"	Joseph Stalin	26 min	July 9, 2021
5	"Create a New Society"	Muammar Gaddafi	25 min	July 9, 2021
6	"Rule Forever"	Kim dynasty	29 min	July 9, 2021

== Production ==
The series was executive produced by David Ginsberg, Jake Laufer, Jonas Bell Pasht, Peter Dinklage, and Jonah Bekhor. The British Board of Film Classification issued a '15' certificate for the series.

== Release ==
The series was released on Netflix on 9 July 2021.

== Reception ==
How to Become a Tyrant generally received positive feedback. On Rotten Tomatoes, it has an approval rating of 100% based on 5 reviews, with an average score of 5.5/10. On IMDb, it has an average rating of 7.7/10.

The series was commonly praised for its combined use of archival footage and animation, while also being informative and maintaining a dark tone. Joe Keller of Decider wrote "[d]espite the weirdness of the show's tone, How To Become A Tyrant gives good capsule histories of how various dictators came to and stayed in power." Shreshta Shulka of Digital Mafia Talkies praised the series for its "beautiful blend of creativity achieved by mincing together animation, real-life footage, and anecdotes showcas[ing] various tyrannical tryst with destinies to perfection."

A point of criticism against How to Become a Tyrant was its infrequent references to Mao Zedong, who ruled China as a dictator from 1949 to 1976. Due to Mao's role in the Great Leap Forward and the Cultural Revolution – both of which were attributed to millions of deaths –, it was expected that he would have a more significant role in the series than only a few mentions. Jim Shannon lamented that the show ought to "[give] a prominent place to the horrors meted out against China's citizens" under Mao Zedong. Additionally, reviewers criticized the series for its lacking representation of other 20th century dictators such as Pol Pot, Chiang Kai-shek, Augusto Pinochet, and others.

== See also ==
- The Dictator's Handbook, by Bruce Bueno de Mesquita and Alastair Smith
