= Ben Sainsbury =

Canadian-American film director

- Born: December 17, 1972 (age 53); Toronto, Ontario, Canada
- Education: College of Marin; University of Southern California
- Occupations: filmmaker, actor, and freelance journalist

Ben Sainsbury (born December 17, 1972) is a dual US/Canadian entrepreneur, filmmaker, actor, and freelance journalist.

== Background ==
Sainsbury was born in Toronto, Ontario, Canada, and was raised for eight years in Mayaguez, Puerto Rico after a family move. Upon returning to Canada, he lived with his family in Seguin, Ontario and attended high school in Rosseau. After high school, he lived in California and Arizona for 16 years and studied acting, earning earned a bachelor's degree in film making at College of Marin. In 2005, he received a master's degree in professional writing at the University of Southern California film school, while working as an actor in commercials to help pay for his film projects and schooling.

Sainsbury holds dual Canadian-U.S. citizenship, and did a three-year enlistment term in the U.S. Army in Psychological Operations. While with his unit, he was trained in the staging of mock battlefield productions and the dealing with of enemies through use of loud music, gathering of intelligence, distribution of surrender propaganda leaflets, and the broadcasting of fake tank noises. His animated film Private Snuffy was inspired by the torture and prisoner abuse committed by military interrogators at Abu Ghraib, and based upon an article he wrote about the incidents for Now Magazine in Toronto. He obtained a grant from the Northern Ontario Heritage Fund to complete the project, and sells computer software in Toronto to make a living.

While in Switzerland working on a PhD on media studies, he became a freelance reporter for PeaceReporter (Milan, Italy), for which he wrote articles on his military service. The article he wrote for Now Magazine in Toronto, which inspired his film Private Snuffy, was translated into Italian for PeaceReporter. Private Snuffy premiered on April 12, 2011, at the Tiburon International Film Festival in Tiburon, California.

Co-founded and is the CEO of Marion Surgical - a virtual reality surgical simulation start up.

== Filmography ==
- Jail Bait (2004, short)
- Pharma (2008)
- Into Darkness (2010)
- Private Snuffy (2011)

== Recognition ==
- 2011, Won 'Best Animation Award' at Cinefest Sudbury for Private Sunffy
