= Cyrano (film) =

2021 film by Joe Wright

- Theatrical release poster
- Directed by: Joe Wright
- Screenplay by: Erica Schmidt
- Based on: Cyrano de Bergerac; 1897 play by: Edmond Rostand Cyrano 2018 musical; Erica Schmidt Aaron Dessner Bryce Dessner Matt Berninger Carin Besser
- Produced by: Tim Bevan; Eric Fellner; Guy Heeley
- Starring: Peter Dinklage; Haley Bennett; Kelvin Harrison Jr.; Ben Mendelsohn
- Cinematography: Seamus McGarvey
- Edited by: Valerio Bonelli
- Music by: Aaron Dessner (score and songs); Bryce Dessner (score and songs); Matt Berninger (songs); Carin Besser (songs)
- Production companies: Metro-Goldwyn-Mayer Pictures; Bron Creative; Working Title Films
- Distributed by: United Artists Releasing (United States); Universal Pictures (international)
- Release dates: 2 September 2021 (Telluride); 25 February 2022 (United States and United Kingdom)
- Running time: 124 minutes
- Countries: United States; Canada; United Kingdom
- Language: English
- Budget: $30 million
- Box office: $6.4 million

Cyrano is a 2021 romantic drama musical film directed by Joe Wright and produced by Tim Bevan, Eric Fellner, and Guy Heeley, from a screenplay written by Erica Schmidt, based on the 2018 stage musical by Schmidt, Aaron Dessner, Bryce Dessner, Matt Berninger, and Carin Besser, itself based on the 1897 Edmond Rostand play Cyrano de Bergerac. The film stars Peter Dinklage, Haley Bennett, Kelvin Harrison Jr., and Ben Mendelsohn.

Cyrano premiered at the 48th Telluride Film Festival on 2 September 2021, and was released in the US and the UK on 25 February 2022. The film was a box office bomb, grossing $6.4 million on a $30 million budget, but received generally positive reviews from critics, who praised Dinklage's and Bennett's performances and the soundtrack. It was nominated for several awards, including a Best Motion Picture and Best Actor (Dinklage) at the 79th Golden Globe Awards, four nominations at the 75th British Academy Film Awards and a Best Costume Design nod at the 94th Academy Awards.

== Plot ==
The beautiful orphan Roxanne attends the theater with the old, vain and showy Duke De Guiche, who is determined to marry her. Roxanne wishes to marry for love, even though she does not have much money and would benefit greatly from marriage to a duke. While taking her seat, she and newly recruited soldier, Christian de Neuvillette, see each other and are instantly infatuated. As the play begins, Roxanne's childhood friend, the dwarven, highborn cadet Cyrano de Bergerac, objects to the lead actor and chases him off the stage with rhyming insults, then duels a man who mocks Cyrano's physical condition (the famous 'nose monologue' in Rostand's original work is replaced by another text).

Roxanne fails to realize that Cyrano is desperately in love with her. She tells Cyrano she has fallen for Christian and asks him to arrange a meeting. Though heartbroken, Cyrano meets Christian and discovers he is inarticulate and incapable of expressing his feelings. Not wanting to disappoint Roxanne, he writes countless letters expressing his own deep feelings for her, which Christian delivers as his own writing.

When Christian and Roxanne meet in person, he is unable to match Cyrano's powerful words that caused her to fall in love with Christian. Roxanne declares she needs more than simple platitudes and storms off. Later, Cyrano helps Christian make amends by hiding in the shadows and whispering what to say to Roxanne. She forgives Christian as a priest delivers a letter from De Guiche, declaring that he will either marry her or have his way with her. Roxanne and Christian hastily marry, infuriating De Guiche, who arranges for Christian and Cyrano's unit to be sent to the war front.

While at war, Cyrano sends Roxanne a letter from Christian every day and risks his own life to keep Christian alive. De Guiche eventually sends their unit on a suicide mission, and Cyrano reveals he has already written a final letter to Roxanne. Christian sees the letter is stained with tears and realizes Cyrano loves Roxanne, and that the man Roxanne really loves is Cyrano. He asks Cyrano to tell Roxanne everything. He then runs out to meet the enemy's guns and is killed.

Three years later, Cyrano is impoverished and in ill-health from war wounds that never fully healed. Roxanne remains his close friend. Sensing he is about to die, Cyrano meets with Roxanne and asks for Christian's final letter. He recites it from memory, revealing he wrote all of Christian's letters. Cyrano and Roxanne declare their love for each other just before he dies in her arms.

== Cast ==
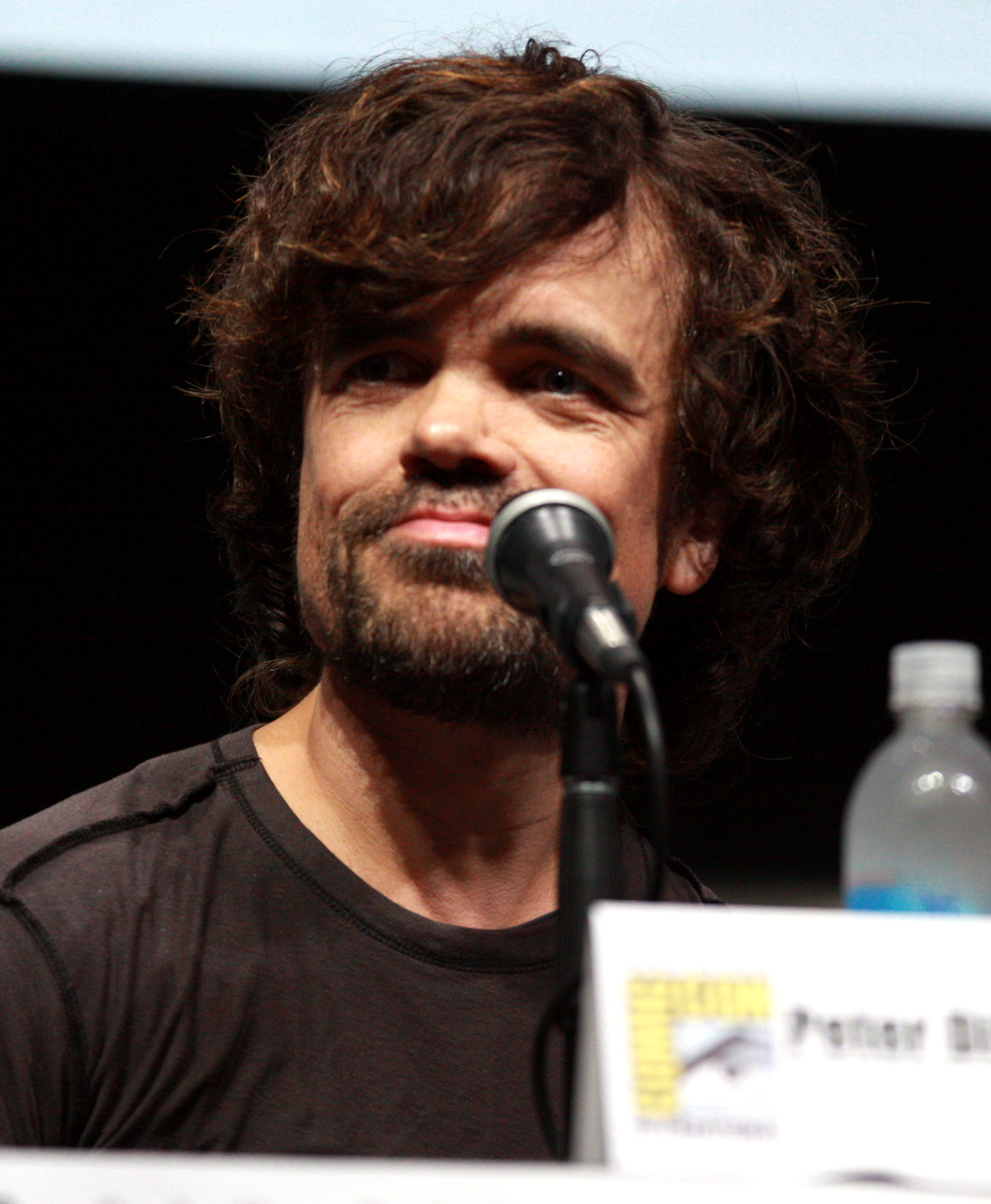
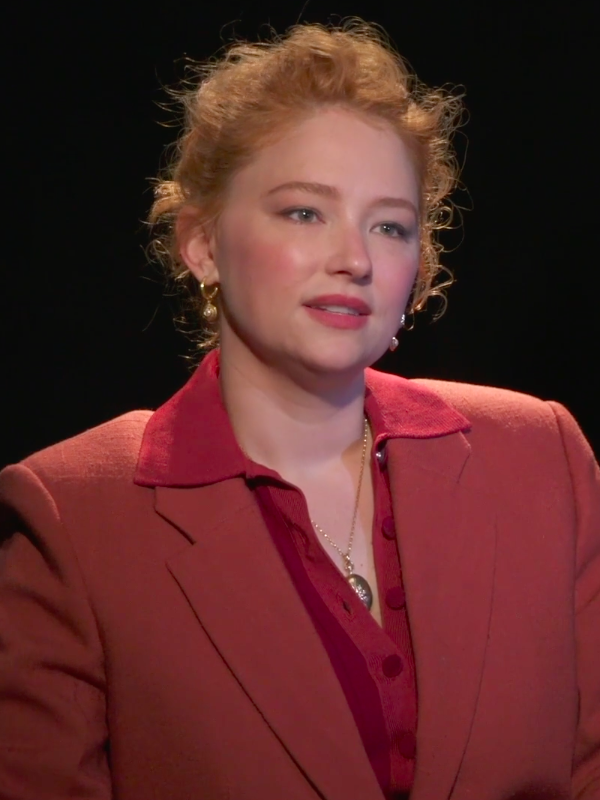
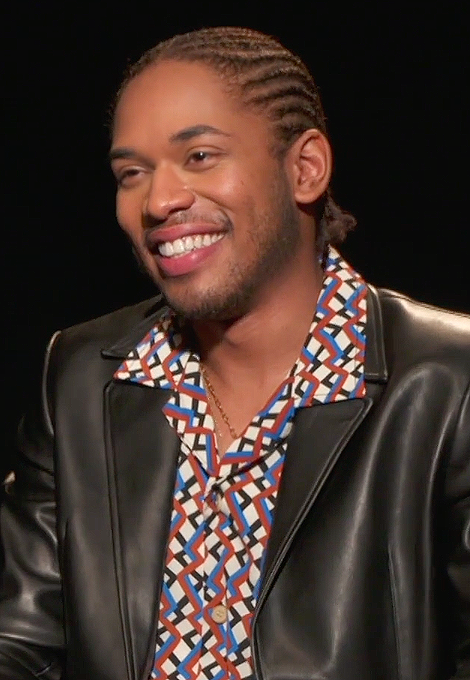
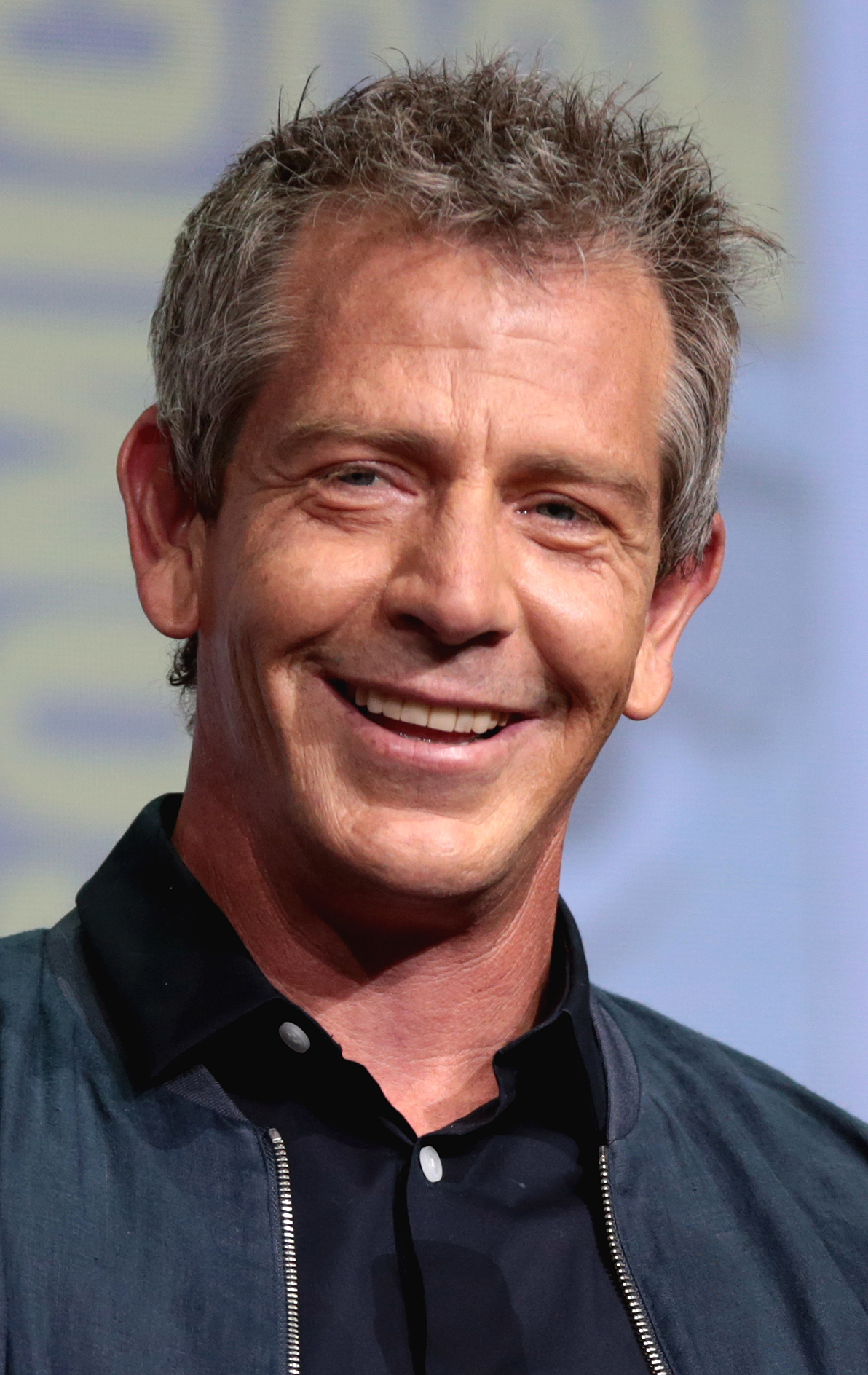
The film's cast includes Peter Dinklage, Haley Bennett, Kelvin Harrison Jr., and Ben Mendelsohn.
- Peter Dinklage as Cyrano de Bergerac
- Haley Bennett as Roxanne
- Kelvin Harrison Jr. as Christian de Neuvillette
- Ben Mendelsohn as De Guiche
- Monica Dolan as Marie, Roxanne's attendant
- Bashir Salahuddin as Le Bret
- Joshua James as Valvert
- Anjana Vasan as Sister Claire
- Ruth Sheen as Mother Marthe
- Glen Hansard, Sam Amidon, and Scott Folan appear as a singing trio of guards, credited respectively as guard #1, guard #2, and guard #3.
- Mark Benton as Montfleury
- Richard McCabe as Priest
- Peter Wight as Ragueneau
- Tim McMullan as Jodelet
- Celeste Dodwell as theatre lady

== Production ==
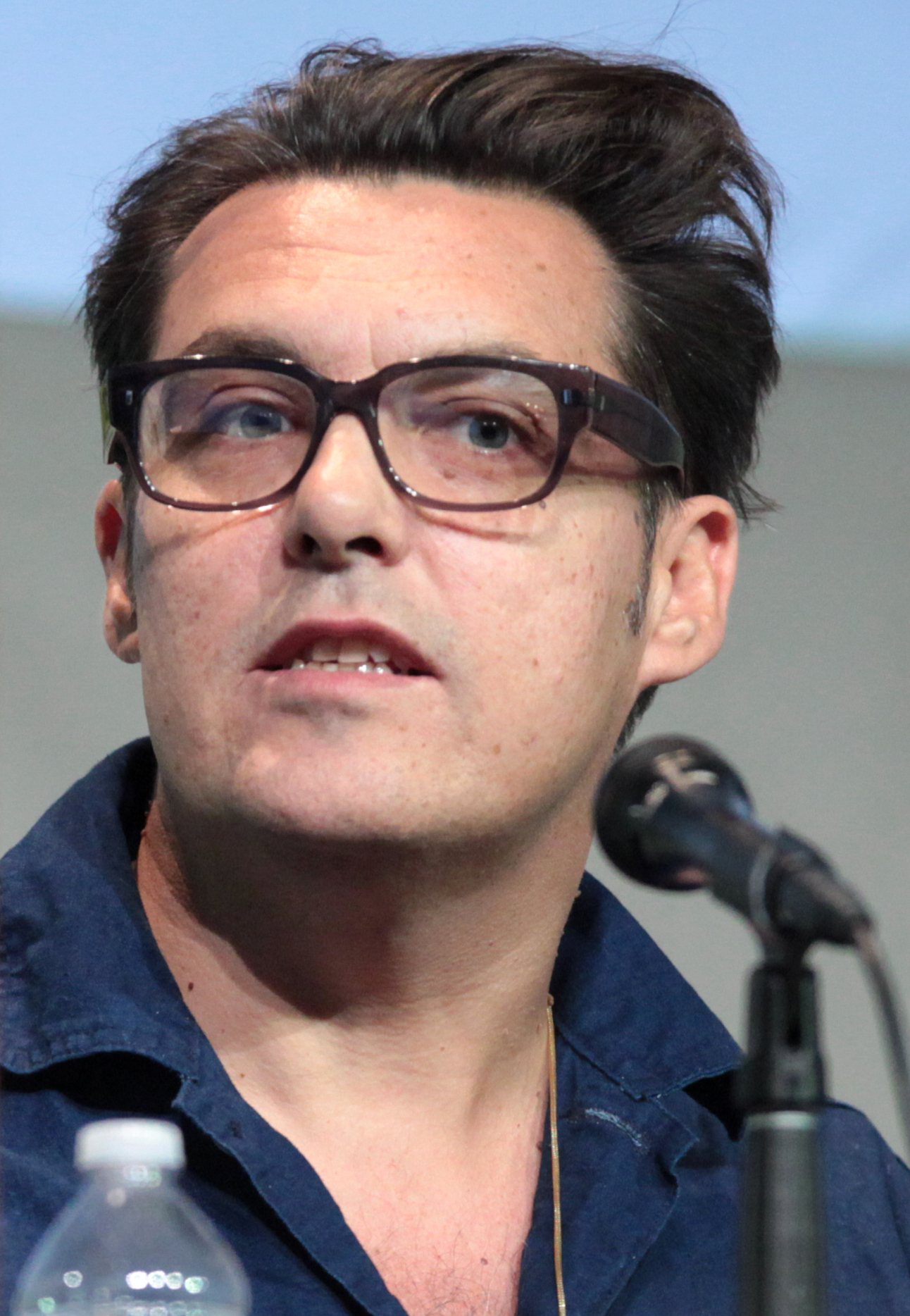
Cyrano director Joe Wright

It was announced in August 2020 that Metro-Goldwyn-Mayer had acquired the rights to the film, which was written by Erica Schmidt, based on her stage musical Cyrano. The film was produced by Working Title Films, and Joe Wright was set to direct. Peter Dinklage and Haley Bennett reprised their roles from the stage musical, with Ben Mendelsohn and Brian Tyree Henry also cast. Kelvin Harrison Jr. joined the cast in September 2020. Bashir Salahuddin later joined the cast to replace Henry. Music for the film was written by members of the National, who also wrote the music and lyrics for the stage musical.

Principal photography began in Sicily (Noto, Syracuse, Scicli) in October 2020, during the COVID-19 pandemic in Italy. All of the vocal performances for the musical numbers were recorded live on set.

== Music ==
The film's opening number, "Someone to Say," was released as a single on October 8, 2021, followed by "Somebody Desperate" on December 3, 2021. The latter song was written exclusively for the film and plays during the end credits. The soundtrack was released on Decca Records on December 10, 2021.

== Release ==
The film had its world premiere at the Telluride Film Festival on September 2, 2021. By the end of its festival run, it screened at the Hamptons, Mill Valley, Rome, and Savannah.

The film was widely theatrically released in the United States and the United Kingdom on February 25, 2022. The film was originally scheduled for a limited theatrical release in the United States on December 25, 2021, but the release date was then moved to December 31. In November 2021, the film's release plans were changed by United Artists Releasing in an effort to better position itself for Academy Awards qualification and contention: it had an exclusive one-week theatrical run in Los Angeles on December 17, prior to a planned limited theatrical release on January 21, 2022, before expanding in subsequent weeks. The release date in the US was shifted to a limited release on January 28, before opening wide on February 11. It was shifted again to a solely wide release on February 25, without a limited release, on the same date as its release in the UK. The UK release was originally scheduled for release on January 14, but was postponed by Universal Pictures as a result of the COVID-19 pandemic response.

The film was released on streaming on March 9, 2022, and on Blu-ray and DVD on April 19, 2022, by Universal Pictures Home Entertainment.

It is also the last MGM title to be released before the studio was acquired by Amazon on March 17, 2022.

== Reception ==
=== Box office ===
Cyrano grossed $3.9 million in the United States and Canada, and $2.5 million in other territories, for a worldwide total of $6.4 million.

In the United States and Canada, Cyrano was released alongside Studio 666, and was projected to gross $2–5 million from 797 theaters in its opening weekend. The film earned $1.4 million in its opening weekend, finishing ninth at the box office. It made $678,783 in its second weekend, finishing eighth. The film dropped out of the box office top ten in its third weekend, finishing eleventh with $398,932.

Outside the U.S. and Canada, the film earned $1.04 million from 10 international markets in its opening weekend.

=== Critical response ===
On the review aggregator website Rotten Tomatoes, 85% of 248 critics' reviews are positive, with an average rating of 7.3/10. The website's consensus reads: "Uneven yet ultimately hard to resist, Joe Wright's Cyrano puts a well-acted musical spin on the oft-adapted classic tale." Metacritic, which uses a weighted average, assigned the film a score of 66 out of 100, based on 46 critics, indicating "generally favorable" reviews.

=== Accolades ===
Accolades received by House of Gucci
Award	Date of ceremony	Category	Recipient(s)	Result	Ref.
Detroit Film Critics Society	December 6, 2021	Best Film	Cyrano	Won	
Detroit Film Critics Society	December 6, 2021	Best Actor	Peter Dinklage	Won	
Detroit Film Critics Society	December 6, 2021	Best Use of Music	Cyrano	Nominated	
Washington D.C. Area Film Critics Association	December 6, 2021	Best Score	Aaron and Bryce Dessner	Nominated	
Golden Globe Awards	January 9, 2022	Best Motion Picture – Musical or Comedy	Cyrano	Nominated	
Golden Globe Awards	January 9, 2022	Best Actor – Motion Picture Comedy or Musical	Peter Dinklage	Nominated	
Hollywood Critics Association	February 28, 2022	Best Comedy/Musical Film	Cyrano	Nominated	
Hollywood Critics Association	February 28, 2022	Best Actor	Peter Dinklage	Nominated	
Hollywood Critics Association	February 28, 2022	Best Original Song	Peter Dinklage, Haley Bennett, and Kelvin Harrison Jr. (for "Every Letter")	Nominated	
Costume Designers Guild Awards	March 9, 2022	Excellence in Period Film	Massimo Cantini Parrini and Jacqueline Durran	Nominated	
Critics' Choice Awards	March 13, 2022	Best Actor	Peter Dinklage	Nominated	
British Academy Film Awards	March 13, 2022	Outstanding British Film	Joe Wright, Tim Bevan, Eric Fellner, Guy Heely, and Erica Schmidt	Nominated	
British Academy Film Awards	March 13, 2022	Best Costume Design	Massimo Cantini Parrini	Nominated	
British Academy Film Awards	March 13, 2022	Best Makeup and Hair	Alessandro Bertolazzi and Siân Miller	Nominated	
British Academy Film Awards	March 13, 2022	Best Production Design	Sarah Greenwood and Katie Spencer	Nominated	
Academy Awards	March 27, 2022	Best Costume Design	Massimo Cantini Parrini and Jacqueline Durran	Nominated	
Satellite Awards	April 2, 2022	Best Motion Picture – Musical or Comedy	Cyrano	Nominated	
Satellite Awards	April 2, 2022	Best Actor	Peter Dinklage	Nominated	
Satellite Awards	April 2, 2022	Best Costume Design	Massimo Cantini Parrini	Won	
