= Peter Dinklage =

American actor (born 1969)

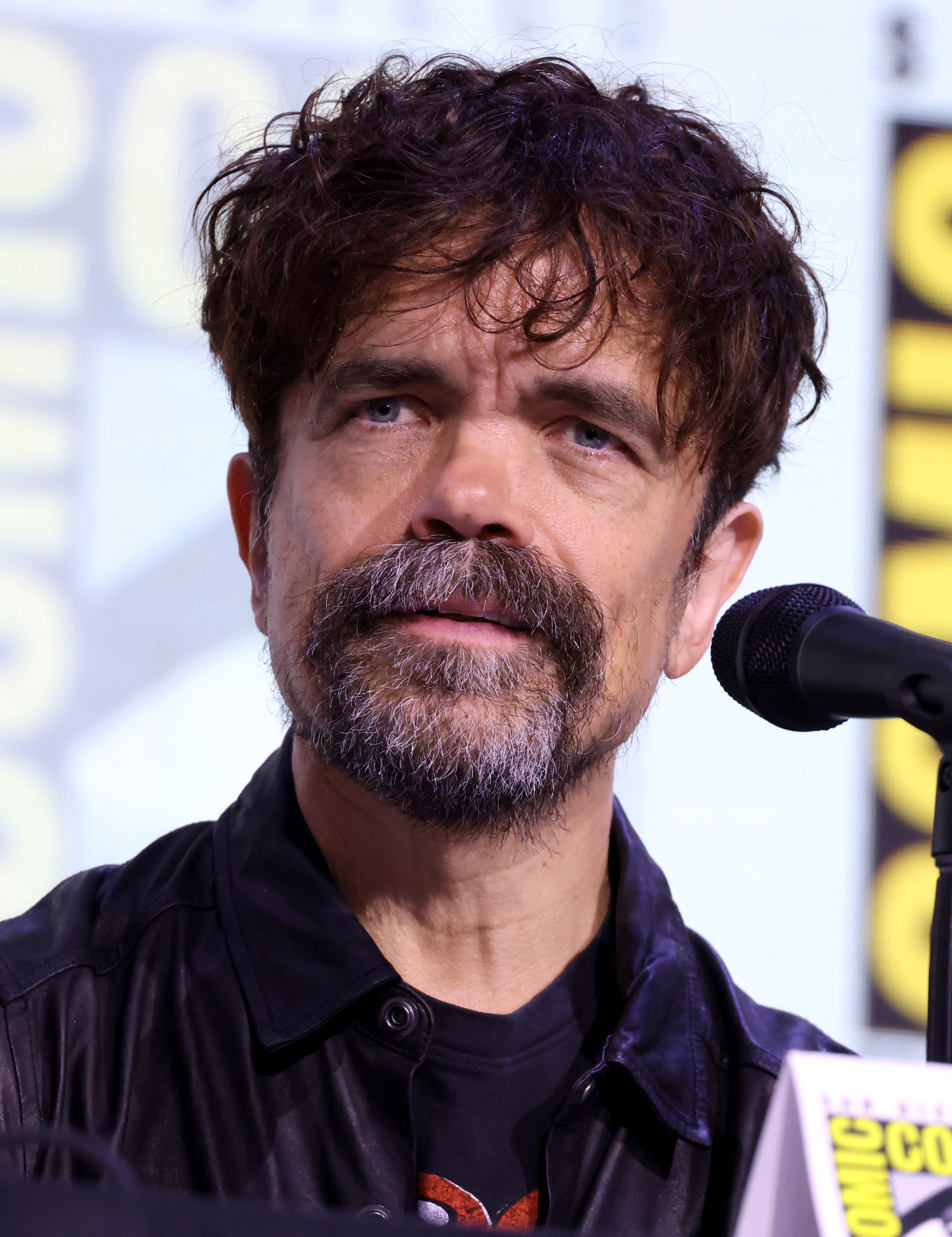
- Dinklage in 2025
- Born: Peter Hayden Dinklage; June 11, 1969 (age 57); Morristown, New Jersey, U.S.
- Education: Bennington College
- Occupation: Actor
- Years active: 1993–present
- Works: Full list
- Height: 4 ft 5 in (1.35 m)
- Spouse: Erica Schmidt (m. 2005)
- Children: 2
- Awards: Full list

Peter Hayden Dinklage (/ˈdɪnklɪdʒ/; born June 11, 1969) is an American actor. Portraying Tyrion Lannister on the HBO television series Game of Thrones (2011–2019), he won the Primetime Emmy Award for Outstanding Supporting Actor in a Drama Series a record four times. Dinklage also received a Golden Globe Award in 2011 and an Actor Award in 2020 for the role.

Born in the North Jersey region of New Jersey, Dinklage studied acting at Bennington College, performing in a number of amateur stage productions. He made his film debut in the black comedy film Living in Oblivion (1995), and had his breakthrough with a starring role in the 2003 comedy-drama The Station Agent. Dinklage's other films include Elf (2003), Lassie and The Baxter (both in 2005), Find Me Guilty (2006), Penelope (2006), Death at a Funeral (2007), The Chronicles of Narnia: Prince Caspian (2008), Death at a Funeral (2010), X-Men: Days of Future Past (2014), Three Billboards Outside Ebbing, Missouri (2017), The Hunger Games: The Ballad of Songbirds & Snakes (2023), The Thicket (2024), and Wicked (2024). In 2018, he appeared as Eitri in the Marvel film Avengers: Infinity War, and as Hervé Villechaize in the biopic film My Dinner with Hervé. Dinklage also provided voice-acting for the video game Destiny, and in 2023, he voiced Scourge in Transformers: Rise of the Beasts. On television, Dinklage also starred in the series Dexter: Resurrection in 2025.

Dinklage has also performed in theater, with roles including the title character in Richard III (2003) at the Public Theatre, Rakitin in A Month in the Country (2015) at Classic Stage Company, and Cyrano de Bergerac in Cyrano at the Daryl Roth Theatre in 2019.

== Early life ==
Dinklage was born on June 11, 1969, in the North Jersey region of New Jersey, to John Carl Dinklage, an insurance salesman, and Diane Dinklage, an elementary school music teacher of German and Irish descent. He grew up in the historic Brookside section of Mendham Township, with his parents and older brother Jonathan. Dinklage is the only member of his family with achondroplasia. He was raised Catholic.

As a child, Dinklage and his brother Jonathan performed puppet musicals for people in their neighborhood. Dinklage has described his brother as "the real performer of the family", saying that Jonathan's passion for the violin was the only thing that kept him from pursuing acting. Jonathan graduated from the Mason Gross School of the Arts at Rutgers University-New Brunswick and served as violinist and concertmaster for the musical Hamilton.

Dinklage had his first theatrical success in a fifth-grade production of The Velveteen Rabbit. Playing the lead, Dinklage was delighted by the audience's response to the show. He attended Delbarton School, a Catholic preparatory school for boys, where he developed his acting skills. In 1984, Dinklage was inspired to pursue an acting career by a production of Sam Shepard's play True West.

Dinklage attended Bennington College, where he studied for a drama degree and appeared in numerous productions before graduating in 1991. Dinklage moved to New York City with his friend Ian Bell to build a theater company; failing to pay the rent, they had to move out of their apartment. He subsequently lived in New York for 20 years in Williamsburg and the West Village, then worked six years for a data-processing company before again pursuing a full-time acting career.

== Career ==
=== Early career (1995–2002) ===
Dinklage initially struggled to find acting work, partially because he refused to take the roles typically offered to actors with his condition, such as "elves or leprechauns". He had a credited film debut in the low-budget independent comedy-drama Living in Oblivion (1995), where he starred alongside Steve Buscemi. It tells the story of a director, crew, and cast filming a low-budget independent film in New York City. Dinklage's role was that of a frustrated actor with dwarfism who complains about his clichéd roles. The next year, he appeared as a building manager in the crime drama Bullet starring rapper Tupac Shakur. Even after his well-received performance in Living in Oblivion, Dinklage could not find someone willing to be his agent. After a recommendation from Buscemi to director Alexandre Rockwell, Dinklage was cast in the comedy 13 Moons (2002). When later interviewed for a theater website, he was asked what his ideal role was, and he replied "to play the romantic lead and get the girl".

=== Breakthrough (2003–2010) ===
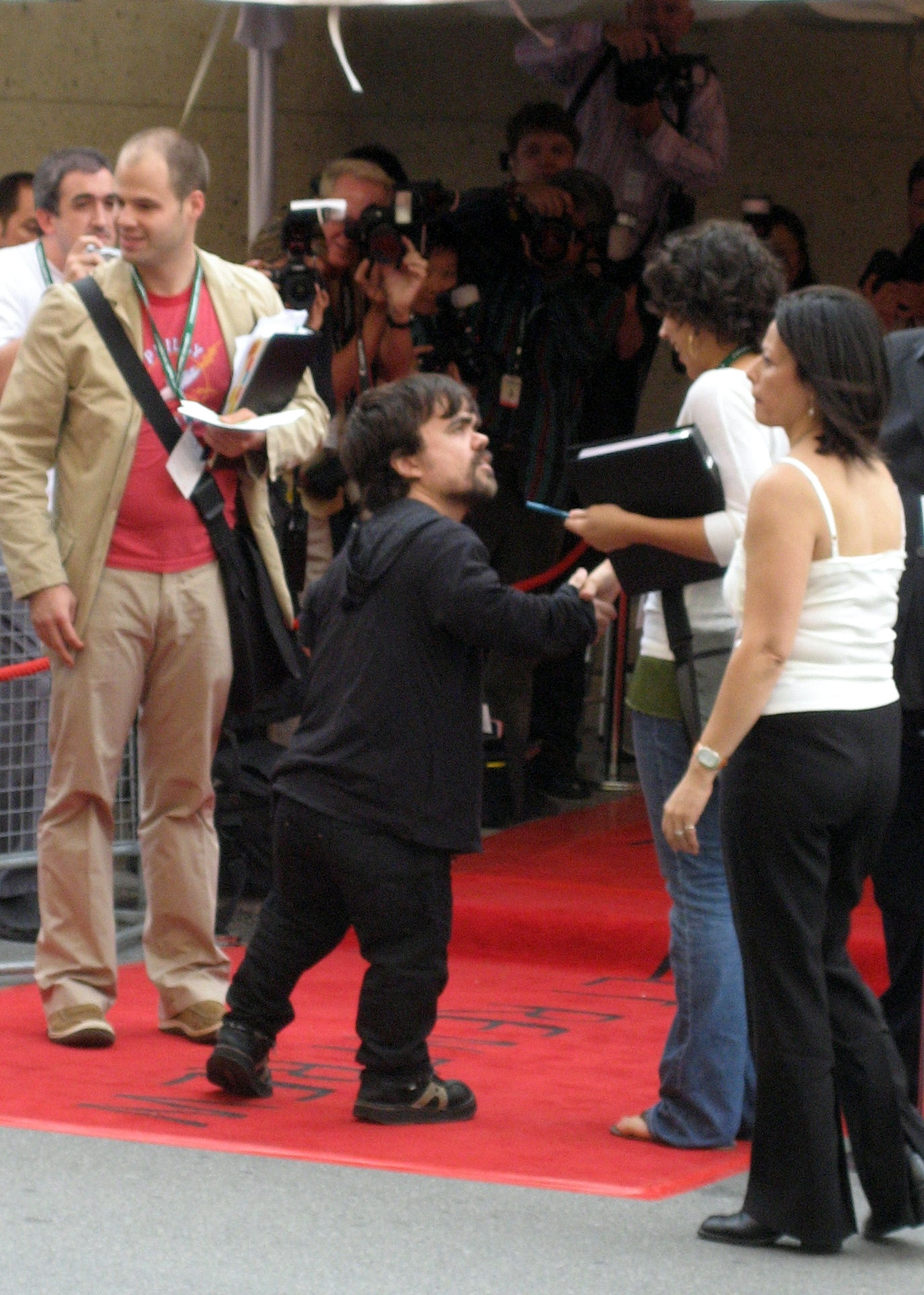
Dinklage at the Toronto Film Festival in 2006, for the premiere of Penelope

Dinklage found his breakthrough playing Finbar McBride, who is a quiet, withdrawn, unmarried man in the 2003 Tom McCarthy-directed film The Station Agent. According to co-star Bobby Cannavale, the film took three years to make and was not at first written with Dinklage in mind. Cannavale said that McCarthy "set out to tell a story about a guy who was a train enthusiast who had chosen to isolate himself from the world", but when McCarthy actually started "putting pen to paper" for the screenplay, he decided to write the role for Dinklage. Speaking about the role, Dinklage noted that usually "roles written for someone my size are a little flat"—often either comical or "sort of Lord of the Rings" type characters filled with wisdom; further: "They're not sexual, they're not romantic" and "they're not flawed." What attracted him to the character McCarthy had written was that it was not one of the stereotypical roles people with dwarfism play; rather, McBride has "romantic feelings" as well as "anger and ... flaws". The role earned him the Independent Spirit Award and Screen Actors Guild Award for Best Actor nominations. In the New York Observer, reviewer Andrew Sarris wrote, "Dinklage projects both size and intelligence in the fascinating reticence of his face." Besides being Dinklage's highest-rated film on the review aggregator Rotten Tomatoes, The Station Agent was modestly successful at the box office, earning over $8 million against its small budget.

Dinklage later appeared in the direct-to-DVD film Tiptoes (2003) with Gary Oldman and Matthew McConaughey. The film met with negative reviews, particularly Oldman's role as a person with dwarfism. According to Dinklage, the original cut of the film was "gorgeous", but the director was fired shortly after turning it in, and the film was re-cut into a "rom-com with dwarfs". Speaking on the Oldman controversy, Dinklage said, "There was some flak: 'Why would you put Gary Oldman on his knees? That's almost like blackface.' And I have my own opinions about political correctness, but I was just like, 'It's Gary Oldman. He can do whatever he wants, and I'm so happy to be here.'"

That year, Dinklage also starred in several off-Broadway productions, such as Richard III. Dinklage appeared in the Christmas comedy film Elf as Miles Finch, an irritable children's author who beats up Buddy Hobbs (Will Ferrell) after he mistakes Finch for an elf. In 2005, he starred in the short-lived CBS science fiction series Threshold and appeared as a wedding planner in the comedy film The Baxter. He also made an appearance in the adventure comedy-drama Lassie as a traveling circus performer.

In 2006, Dinklage co-starred with Vin Diesel in Find Me Guilty, a courtroom drama directed by Sidney Lumet. The film tells the true story of the longest Mafia trial in American history; Dinklage played Ben Klandis, the lead defense attorney. Critical reaction to the film was mostly positive, though it was a commercial failure. Writing for Chicago Sun-Times, film critic Roger Ebert praised Dinklage's performance, saying that the character he plays stands apart as "concise, articulate and professional". The same year, he portrayed the character Marlowe Sawyer in episodes of Nip/Tuck. He played a fictionalized version of himself in an episode of the HBO series Entourage and appeared in NBC's 30 Rock as Stewart. The same year, Dinklage appeared in the British romantic comedy Penelope playing Lemon, a tabloid reporter. The film received mixed reviews from critics.

Dinklage appeared in the 2007 British comedy film Death at a Funeral, reprising the role in the 2010 American remake. Later in 2007, he played the villainous Simon Bar Sinister in Underdog, which was poorly received, but had some commercial success.

Dinklage played Trumpkin in the 2008 film The Chronicles of Narnia: Prince Caspian. The film was considered a box office disappointment compared to the first installment, with global revenues of $419.7 million, and film critic Bill Gibron described Dinklage's role as a "cutesy stereotype he has tried to avoid". Later that year, he played the title role in Uncle Vanya (directed by his wife, Erica Schmidt) in Bard College's annual Bard SummerScape, the Upstate New York summer stage on the Annandale-on-Hudson campus. In 2010, he appeared in the Australian movie I Love You Too alongside Brendan Cowell and Peter Helliar.

=== Mainstream and critical success (2011–present) ===
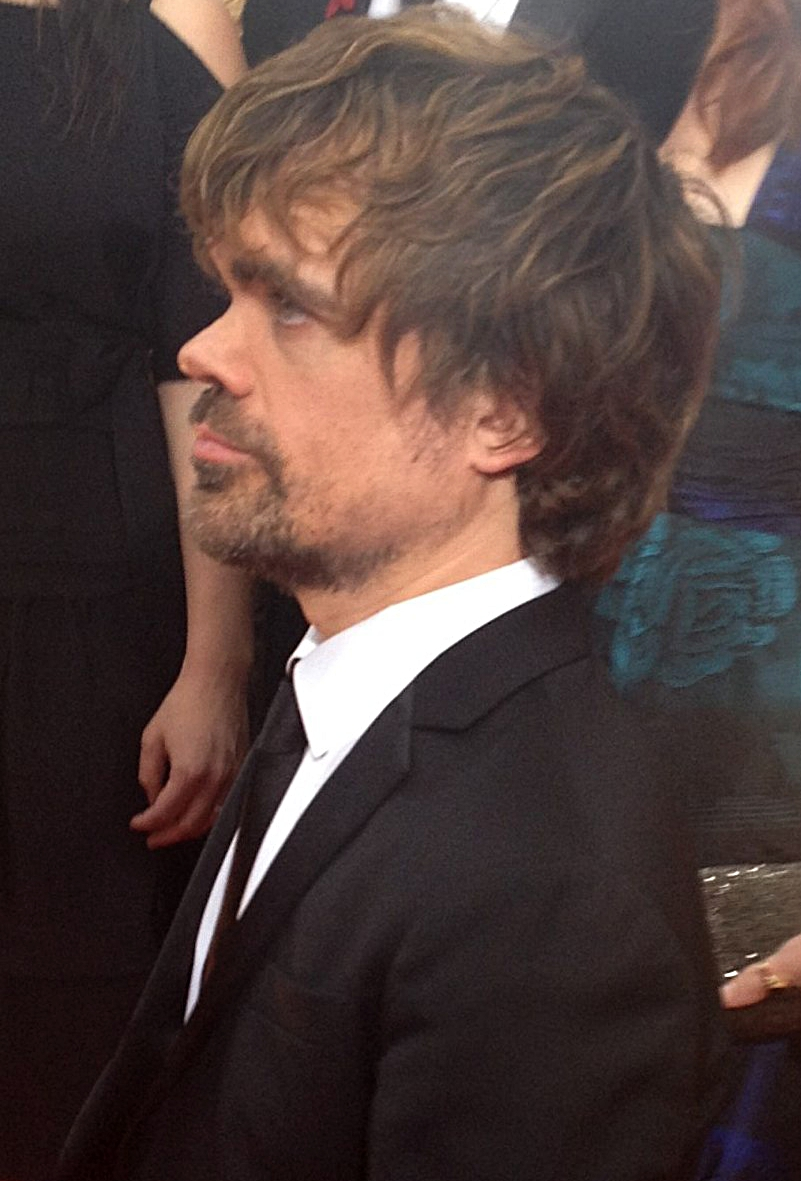
Dinklage attending the 69th Annual Golden Globes Awards in 2012

==== Game of Thrones ====
Between 2011 and 2019, Dinklage portrayed Tyrion Lannister in HBO's fantasy drama Game of Thrones, an adaptation of author George R. R. Martin's A Song of Ice and Fire novels. Game of Thrones takes place on the fictional continents of Westeros and Essos and chronicles the power struggles among noble families as they fight for control of the Iron Throne of the Seven Kingdoms. Tyrion is a member of House Lannister, one of the wealthiest and most powerful families in Westeros, and uses his status as a Lannister to mitigate the impact of the marginalization and derision he has received all of his life.

In May 2009, he was the first actor to be cast. Showrunners David Benioff and D. B. Weiss noted that Dinklage, whom they described as funny, smart and witty, was their first choice for the role, as the actor's "core of humanity, covered by a shell of sardonic dry wit, is pretty well in keeping with the character".

Unfamiliar with the source material, Dinklage was cautious in his first meeting with the producers; as a dwarf, "he wouldn't play elves or leprechauns" and was choosy about genre roles. Benioff and Weiss told Dinklage that the character was "a different kind of fantasy little person", or in the actor's words, "No beard, no pointy shoes, a romantic, real human being." Dinklage signed on to play Tyrion before the meeting was half over, in part because, he said, "They told me how popular he was." Martin said of Dinklage's casting, "If he hadn't accepted the part, oh, boy, I don't know what we would have done." The series proved to be a commercial success; it was renewed for multiple seasons and concluded with its eighth season in May 2019.

Dinklage received widespread critical praise for his performance. Matthew Gilbert from The Boston Globe said that Dinklage "gives a winning performance that is charming, morally ambiguous, and self-aware". Dan Kois of The New York Times noted that Dinklage's performance has made the character "all the more popular". The Los Angeles Times wrote "In many ways, Game of Thrones belongs to Dinklage." HuffPost called Tyrion the "most quotable" character and "one of the most beloved characters" of the series.

For his performance, he went on to win the Emmy Award for Outstanding Supporting Actor in a Drama Series in 2011, 2015, 2018, and 2019, as well as the 2012 Golden Globe Award for Best Supporting Actor. As a result of his performance and increased screen time, Dinklage was given top billing starting in the series' second season. In 2014, he said on The Late Show with David Letterman that he had once tried to read the books the show is based upon, but had found them confusing. He joked, "George Martin, our author, is probably going to kill my character soon because I mentioned that." In 2014, Dinklage and four of his Game of Thrones co-stars became some of the highest paid actors on television, although sources differ on the actors' per-episode salaries. (Note: The Hollywood Reporter gives a $1.1 million figure, while The Daily Telegraph gives £2 million.) In 2015, Dinklage lent his voice for the role of Tyrion in Game of Thrones: A Telltale Games Series, a video game based on the show.

==== Other performances ====
In 2011, Dinklage appeared opposite Kate Hudson in Nicole Kassell's A Little Bit of Heaven. The following year, Dinklage voiced Captain Gutt in Ice Age: Continental Drift. Dinklage said he prepared himself by making sure to rest his voice before the recording sessions as it was his first voice acting role, and that he prefers doing roles he has not done before. After appearing in an episode of NBC's late-night sketch comedy Saturday Night Live in 2013, Dinklage hosted an episode of the show in April 2016; his appearances included a sketch of him and Gwen Stefani singing a new song called "Space Pants". He received praise for his performance.

In 2014, Dinklage starred in the comedy horror film Knights of Badassdom opposite Ryan Kwanten and Steve Zahn. The film is about three best friends that go to the woods and reenact a live action Dungeons & Dragons role play, when they mistakenly conjure up a demon from Hell. The same year, he played the villain Bolivar Trask in the superhero film X-Men: Days of Future Past. In preparation for his role, Dinklage stated that he did not want to approach the character necessarily as a villain, saying that Trask "actually sees what he's doing as a good thing". He also voiced the AI Ghost in the 2014 video game Destiny, but was replaced by Nolan North in August 2015. Executive producer Mark Noseworthy said that it was due to scheduling difficulties caused by Dinklage's other acting commitments.

In 2015, Dinklage starred in the science fiction comedy film Pixels as a former arcade champion named Eddie Plant. According to director Chris Columbus, Plant was partially inspired by Billy Mitchell. The film was critically panned. The Guardian praised Dinklage's performance in an otherwise "dreary romp".

In 2016, Dinklage provided the voice of The Mighty Eagle in The Angry Birds Movie, and recorded a song for the musical's soundtrack.

His next release, the independent film Rememory (2017), failed to impress reviewers, but his role of Sam Bloom was praised. Freelance film critic Yasmin Kleinbart stated that "Dinklage deserves better than this film" and John DeFore in The Hollywood Reporter said that he "delivers a soulful lead performance that will attract fans' attention". Also in 2017, Dinklage had a supporting role in the drama-dark comedy film Three Billboards Outside Ebbing, Missouri, from director Martin McDonagh, and the drama Three Christs, both of which played at the Toronto International Film Festival, with the former receiving widespread critical success. In 2018, Dinklage produced and starred in I Think We're Alone Now, a post-apocalyptic drama based on the companionship between Del, played by Dinklage, and Grace, played by Elle Fanning. The film premiered at the 2018 Sundance Film Festival, and was later released to theaters on September 14, 2018.

In 2016, Dinklage and his longtime manager David Ginsburg founded their joint-venture production company, Estuary Films. I Think We're Alone Now is the first film under Estuary.

Dinklage appeared in the 2018 Marvel Studios film Avengers: Infinity War as the character Eitri, a giant dwarf.

Dinklage and writer-director Sacha Gervasi spent several years writing and producing a film based on the final days of actor Hervé Villechaize, who died by suicide shortly after his 1993 interview with Gervasi. In 2018, Dinklage starred and played the title role in My Dinner with Hervé. The movie was approved by HBO, with Dinklage co-starring alongside Jamie Dornan.

In August and September 2018, he starred in the title role of Cyrano, a stage musical adaptation of Cyrano de Bergerac written by his wife Erica Schmidt, with songs by the band The National. He reprised the role in a 2021 film adaptation of the musical, for which he was nominated for the Golden Globe Award for Best Actor in a Musical or Comedy.

In 2019, Dinklage was announced he would co-star in the comedy film Brothers, alongside Josh Brolin. The film, directed by Max Barbakow with a screenplay by Macon Blair from a story by Etan Cohen, was released in October 2024.

In 2020, Dinklage portrayed the pirate Fannybaws in the music video of the same name from Scottish power metal band Alestorm.

In 2020, Dinklage portrayed mobster Roman Lunyov in the crime thriller I Care a Lot. His performance was praised, with Tony Sokol favorably comparing his character to Russian mobsters in other media, including Training Day and Orange is the New Black.

In 2023, Dinklage voiced Terrorcon Scourge, the main antagonist in Transformers: Rise of the Beasts. He also starred in the romantic comedy-drama film She Came to Me, and played Casca Highbottom in the film The Hunger Games: The Ballad of Songbirds and Snakes. In 2024, Dinklage was announced to voice Dr. Dillamond in the two-part film adaptation of the musical, Wicked, alongside a cast including Cynthia Erivo and Ariana Grande. In 2024, Dinklage had a cameo in Jerry Seinfeld's Unfrosted, which premiered on Netflix.

On October 5, 2017, Dinklage purchased the rights to the film adaptation of Joe R. Lansdale's novel The Thicket. The film, The Thicket, which stars Dinklage alongside Juliette Lewis and Esme Creed-Miles, was released in September 2024.

In 2024, Dinklage voiced Hercule Poirot in an Audible adaptation of Agatha Christie's The Mysterious Affair at Styles, reprising the role in 2025's The A.B.C. Murders.

In 2023, Dinklage starred as the titular character in The Toxic Avenger, which was released on August 29, 2025.

In 2025, Dinklage starred as main antagonist Leon Prater in the first season of Dexter: Resurrection.

== Personal life ==
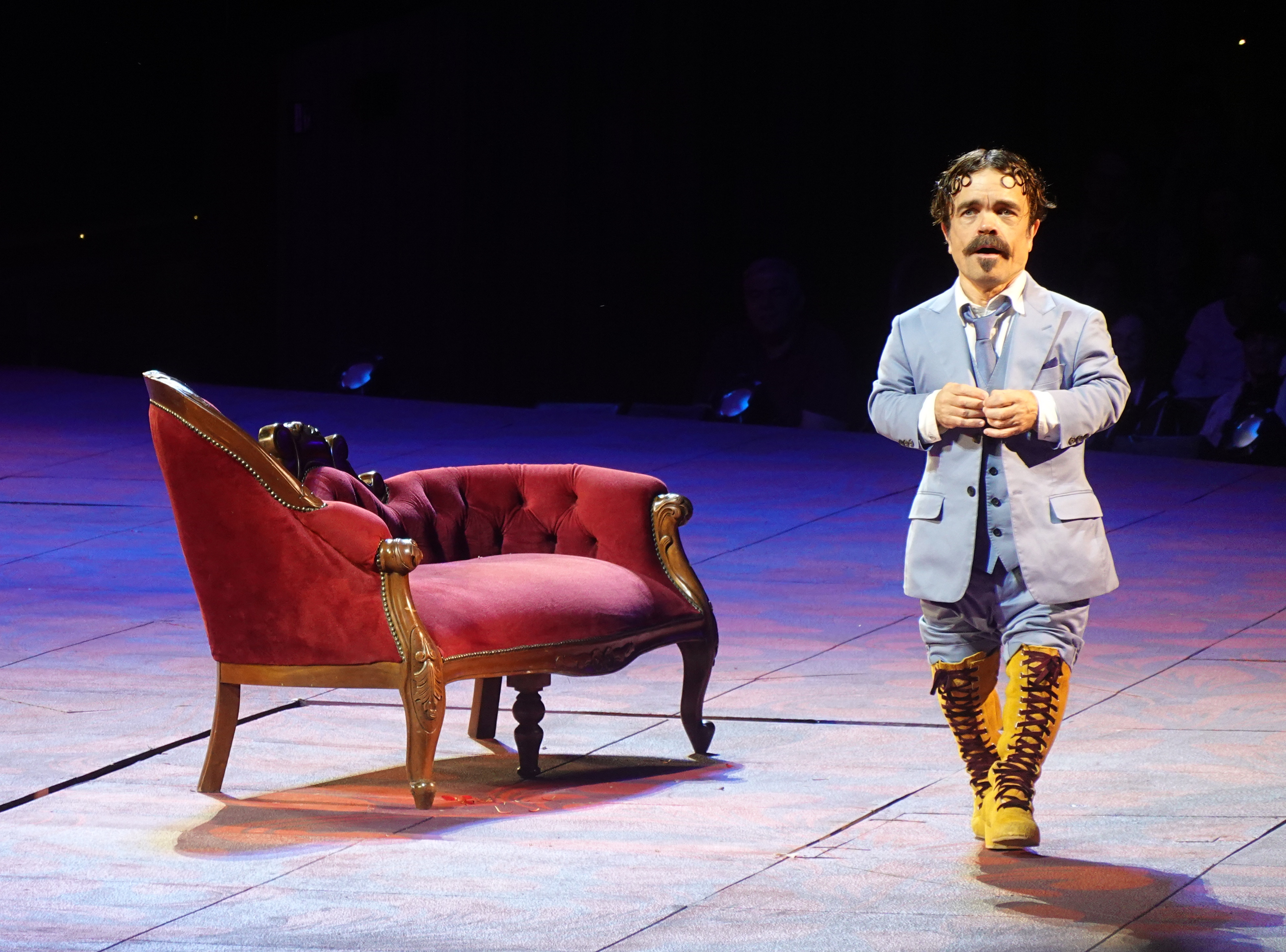
Peter Dinklage in 2025 Shakespeare in the Park performance of Twelfth Night

In 2005, Dinklage married Erica Schmidt, a theater director. They have two children: a daughter born in 2011 and a son born in 2017. They primarily reside in Greenwich Village, Manhattan and have a property in Ulster County, New York.

Dinklage's face was injured in the early 1990s when he was in a "punk-funk-rap" band called Whizzy. He was playing at the nightclub CBGB in New York City, when he was accidentally kneed in the face and started bleeding on the stage. It gave him a scar that runs from his neck to his eyebrow.

In 2008, Dinklage described himself as a lapsed Catholic.

Dinklage became a vegetarian at the age of 16. In a 2024 episode of the podcast Flagrant he stated he started eating fish and chicken again while filming Game of Thrones in Croatia as he became fatigued on set, although he does not eat red meat. He supports Farm Sanctuary and has been the group's spokesperson for its Walk for Farm Animals. He appeared in a PETA campaign, asking Game of Thrones fans to adopt pets from shelters rather than buying huskies that might look like direwolves.

In 2017, Dinklage attended the Women's March demonstration in Park City, Utah to advocate legislation and policies regarding human rights and other issues.

=== Dwarfism ===
Dinklage has achondroplasia, a genetic disorder that affects bone growth. As a result, he is 4 feet 5 inches (1.35 m) tall, with an average-sized head and torso but shorter than average limbs. He has come to accept his condition, but sometimes found it challenging when growing up. In 2003, he said that when he was younger, he was often angry and bitter, but that as he got older, he realized he "just [has] to have a sense of humor" to know "that it's not your problem. It's theirs."

When asked in 2012 whether he saw himself as "a spokesman for the rights of little people", Dinklage said: "I don't know what I would say. Everyone's different. Every person my size has a different life, a different history. Different ways of dealing with it. Just because I'm seemingly okay with it, I can't preach how to be okay with it." He has nonetheless been viewed as a role model for people sharing his condition.

At the 2012 Golden Globe ceremony, when Dinklage won the award for Best Supporting Actor – Series, Miniseries or Television Film, he told the audience that he had been thinking about "a gentleman, his name is Martin Henderson", and suggested that they Google his name. Henderson was a man with dwarfism from Somerset, England, who was badly injured after being tossed by a rugby fan in a bar. Dinklage's words brought media and public attention to the act of dwarf-tossing, with Henderson's name being trended worldwide on social media. Henderson eventually died of his injuries in 2016, five years after the incident. Dinklage turned down offers from talk shows to discuss the topic. He later explained that 20 years earlier, he might have accepted the offers, but that he was "a little bit more at peace with things now", and "I said what I wanted to say... I have a friend who says the world doesn't need another angry dwarf."

In January 2022, Dinklage appeared on an episode of the WTF with Marc Maron podcast, where he criticized Disney's portrayal of the Seven Dwarfs in the then-upcoming live-action remake of the 1937 animated film Snow White and the Seven Dwarfs. He said that although Disney tried to be progressive by casting a Latina actress as Snow White, they had retained the damaging stereotype of the Seven Dwarfs. Disney responded: "We are taking a different approach with these seven characters and have been consulting with members of the dwarfism community. We look forward to sharing more as the film heads into production after a lengthy development period".

== Acting credits and accolades ==
According to the review aggregator site Rotten Tomatoes, Dinklage's most critically acclaimed films are Living in Oblivion (1995), The Station Agent (2003), Lassie (2005), X-Men: Days of Future Past (2014), and Three Billboards Outside Ebbing, Missouri (2017).

Dinklage won a Golden Globe Award and a Screen Actors Guild Award for his performance in Game of Thrones. He has also won four Primetime Emmy Awards: Outstanding Supporting Actor in a Drama Series for the same role. He is also the only member of the cast to receive a Primetime Emmy. Dinklage has been nominated for the Screen Actors Guild Award for Outstanding Performance by a Male Actor each year from 2014 to 2017. He has also been nominated for Critics' Choice Television Award for Best Supporting Actor three times, in 2012, 2016 and 2017. As of 2024, Dinklage has won thirty-two awards from seventy-six nominations. He has been nominated for nine Primetime Emmy Awards and sixteen Screen Actors Guild Awards, winning four Primetime Emmy Awards, two Screen Actors Guild Awards and a Golden Globe Award.

== Discography ==
| Year | Title | Album |
|---|---|---|
| 2024 | "Something Bad" (featuring Cynthia Erivo) | Wicked: The Soundtrack |
