= Alex Mintz =

- אלכס מינץ
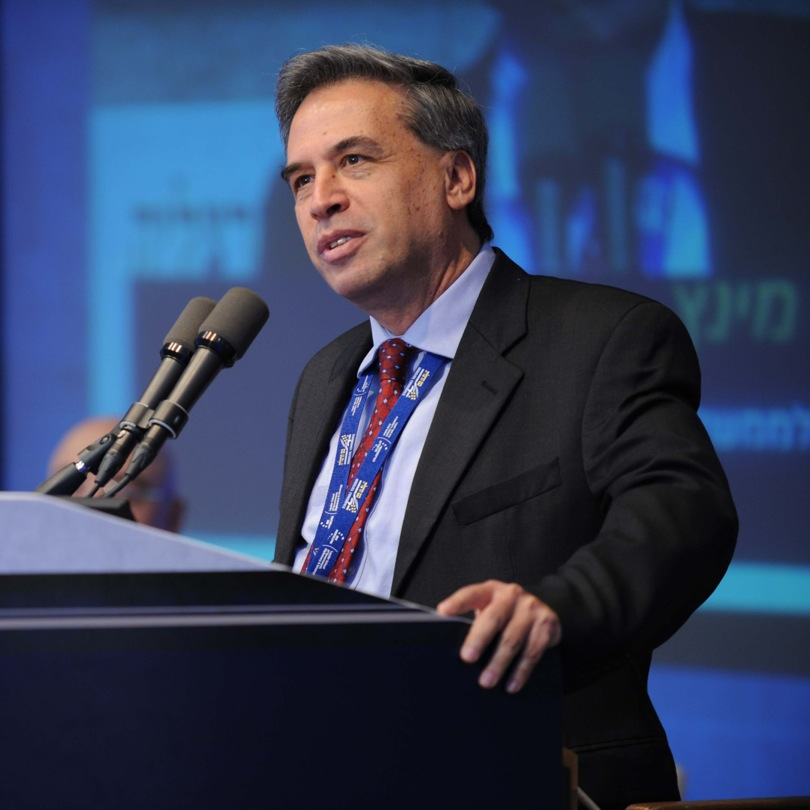
- Alex Mintz at IDC Herzliya
- Born: April 2, 1953 (age 73)
- Education: Tel Aviv University; Northwestern University
- Occupations: Director, Computerized Decision Making Lab; Former Provost of the IDC

Professor Alex Mintz (Hebrew: אלכס מינץ; born April 2, 1953), Director of the Computerized Decision Making Lab, and former Provost of IDC Herzliya, is a professor for decision-making in government, and former President of the Israeli Political Science Association.

Recipient of the Lifetime Achievement Award of the Israeli Political Science Association, the Distinguished Scholar Award of the Foreign-Policy section of the International Studies Association, and the Karl Deutsch Award of the International Studies Association for most significant contribution to the field of international relations by a scholar younger than 40. His book on decision-making in the American government (with C. Wayne) was published in 2016 by the prestigious Stanford University Press and received the 2017 Alexander George Best Book Award of the International Society for Political Psychology (ISPP).

Mintz has served on the editorial boards of 11 international journals, including the American Political Science Review, International Studies Quarterly, Foreign Policy Analysis, International Studies Perspective, Open Political Science Journal, Advances in Political Psychology, and Research and Politics. He served as editor-in-chief of the international journal Political Psychology (2010-2015), as associate editor of the Yale-based Journal of Conflict Resolution (2004-2009), and as editor of the University of Chicago Press book series in Leadership and Decision Making in the International Arena (until 2012).

Mintz is also the director of the Program in Political Psychology and Decision Making (POPDM) at the IDC. He served as a co-chair of the steering committee for the project "Israeli Hope: Toward a New Israeli Order", with the blessings of the President of Israel. He served as Chair of the Herzliya Conference series and as Director of the Institute for Policy and Strategy from 2013 to 2016 and as Dean of the Lauder School of Government, Diplomacy and Strategy at IDC from 2008 to 2014.

== Education ==
Mintz received his B.A. from Tel Aviv University in political science with a minor in mathematics. He then went on to receive an M.A. from Northwestern University in political science before pursuing his PhD, also at Northwestern. His research interests focus on political decision making, political marketing, behavioral political science (BPS), political psychology, strategy, and research methods.

== Career ==
Mintz was an instructor at Northwestern University and a lecturer and then senior lecturer with tenure at the Hebrew University of Jerusalem. He taught at Texas A&M University from 1986 to 2005. In 1993, he became the founding director of the Program in Foreign Policy Decision Making at Texas A&M University and remained there as the Cullen-McFadden Professor of Political Science until 2005. He was a visiting professor at Yale, Columbia University, the Lyndon Johnson School at the University of Texas at Austin, the University of Haifa, and Tel Aviv University. He moved to IDC Herzliya in Israel in 2006 as a professor, before becoming the dean of the Lauder School of Government, Diplomacy and Strategy in 2008. In 2017, Mintz was appointed as Provost of IDC Herzliya.

Mintz is the developer of the Decision Board, a decision-making simulator leveraging process tracing and decision science algorithms to uncover biases, decision codes, and information acquisition patterns. The platform has been used for training decision makers in both public and private organizations.

== Awards and honors ==
- 2019- Recipient of the Lifetime Achievement Award of the Israeli Political Science Association.
- 2017- Recipient of the Alexander George Best Book Award of the ISPP.
- 2015 - Elected as chairman of the Israeli Political Science Association.
- 2005 – Recipient of the Distinguished Scholar Award of the Foreign Policy section of the International Studies Association.
- 2005 – Named to the advisory board of the Center for Conflict Prevention and Management in Sydney, Australia.
- 1993 – Recipient of the Karl Deutsch Award of the International Studies Association.

== Published works ==
=== Books ===
- The Polythink Syndrome: U.S. Foreign Policy Decisions on 9/11, Afghanistan, Iraq, Iran, Syria and ISIS . 2016. (with Carly Wayne). Stanford University Press.
- Terrorist Decision Making: A Leader-Centric Approach (with J.T. Chatagnier and Y. Samban), Routledge, 2019
- The Oxford Handbook of Behavioral Political Science (with L. Terris), Oxford University Press, forthcoming.
- Beyond Rationality (with Nicholas Valentino and Carly Wayne). Cambridge University Press, forthcoming
- Understanding Foreign Policy Decision Making. Cambridge University Press, 2010 (with Karl DeRouen Jr.)
- New Directions for International Relations: Confronting the Method-of-Analysis Problem (co-editor, with Bruce Russett), Lexington Books, February 2005
- Multiple Paths to Knowledge: Methodology In Conflict Management and Conflict Resolution (co-editor with Zeev Maoz, T. Clifton Morgan, Glenn Palmer, Richard J. Stoll), Lexington, 2004
- Integrating Cognitive and Rational Theories of Decision Making (editor and contributor), Palgrave Macmillan, 2002.
- Decision Making on War and Peace: The Cognitive–Rational Debate (co-editor and contributor with N. Geva). Boulder, Colorado: Lynne Rienner Publishers, 1997.
- The Political Economy of Military Spending in the United States (editor and contributor) London: Routledge, 1992.
- Defense, Welfare and Growth (co-editor and contributor, with Steve Chan) London: Routledge, 1992.
- The Politics of Resource Allocation in the U.S. Department of Defense: International Crises and Domestic Constraints. Boulder, Colorado: Westview Press, 1988.
