= Karl Deutsch Award (international relations) =

Award in international relations

The Karl Deutsch Award is an award in the field of international relations to prominent scholars under 40 or within ten years of defending their doctoral dissertation. It was named after Karl Deutsch and was established in 1981 by the International Studies Association (ISA). The award is presented annually to a scholar who is judged to have made the most significant contribution to the study of International Relations and Peace Research by the means of publication.

== Criteria of recipients ==
Recipients must be a current member of ISA and under age 40, or within ten years of defending their doctoral dissertation.

== Award ==
A $500.00 (USD) cash prize is awarded to the recipient. Previous nominees are eligible for the award so long as they meet the merit and age requirements.

== Past recipients ==
Here is a list of the past recipients.

- 1985 Bruce Bueno de Mesquita / Richard K. Ashley
- 1986 Michael Wallace
- 1987 Michael D. Ward
- 1988 Steve Chan
- 1989 Zeev Maoz
- 1990 Joshua Goldstein
- 1991 Jack Snyder
- 1992 Duncan Snidal
- 1993 Alex Mintz
- 1994 James D. Morrow
- 1995 T. Clifton Morgan
- 1996 Robert Powell
- 1997 Paul Huth
- 1998 Paul Diehl
- 1999 James Fearon
- 2000 Edward D. Mansfield
- 2001 Beth A. Simmons
- 2002 Dan Reiter
- 2003 Kenneth A. Schultz
- 2004 Allan C. Stam
- 2005 Alastair Smith
- 2006 Christopher Gelpi
- 2007 Kristian Skrede Gleditsch
- 2008 Ashley Leeds
- 2009 Jon Pevehouse
- 2010 Virginia Page Fortna
- 2011 Michael Tomz
- 2012 Emilie Hafner-Burton
- 2013 Jeremy M. Weinstein
- 2014 Erica Chenoweth
- 2015 Halvard Buhaug
- 2016 Jacob Shapiro
- 2017 Michael C. Horowitz
- 2018 Jessica L.P. Weeks
- 2019 Susan Hyde
- 2020 Nils B. Weidmann
- 2021 Joshua D. Kertzer
- 2022 Paul Staniland
- 2023 Amanda Murdie
- 2024 Aila M. Matanock

== See also ==
- List of social sciences awards
