= Bruce Russett =

American political scientist

Bruce Martin Russett
- Born: January 26, 1935; North Adams, Massachusetts, U.S.
- Died: September 23, 2023 (aged 88)
- Occupation: Academic

Bruce Martin Russett (26 January 1935 – September 22, 2023) was an American political scientist who was most well-known for his work on the democratic peace. He was Dean Acheson Professor of Political Science and Professor in International and Area Studies, MacMillan Center, Yale University, and edited the Journal of Conflict Resolution from 1972 to 2009.

== Academic career ==
Russett received his B.A. in Political Economy from Williams College in 1956, a Diploma in Economics from King's College, Cambridge in 1957, and a Ph.D. in Political Science from Yale in 1961. His first academic appointment was at MIT in 1961. He has taught at Yale since 1962 and has been Dean Acheson Professor since 1985. He has held visiting appointments at Columbia University (1965), Mental Health Research Institute, University of Michigan (1965–66), Institut d'Etudes Europeennes, Université libre de Bruxelles (1969–70), Richardson Institute for Peace & Conflict Research, London (1973–74), Institute for Research in Social Science, University of North Carolina (1979–80), Netherlands Institute for Advanced Study (1974), University of Tel Aviv (1989), Professor of International Capital Markets Law, Tokyo University Law School (1996), and Harvard University (2001).

== Selected awards and activities ==
He has been president of the Peace Science Society (International) (1977–79) and the International Studies Association (1983–84). He is a Fellow of the American Academy of Arts and Sciences, and in 2002 he received an honorary doctorate from Uppsala University. He was principal advisor to the U.S. Catholic Conference in writing their 1983 pastoral letter, The Challenge of Peace, and with Paul Kennedy staffed the Ford Foundation's 1995 report, The United Nations in Its Second Half-Century. His grants and fellowships include multiple awards from the National Science Foundation (11), the Carnegie Corporation (4), the Ford Foundation (3), the MacArthur Foundation (3), the Rockefeller Brothers Foundation (3), the World Society Foundation of Switzerland (3), Fulbright-Hays (2), Guggenheim Fellowships (2), and the U.S. Institute of Peace (2).

== Bibliography ==
=== Books ===
- Community and Contention: Britain and America in the Twentieth Century (1963).
- World Handbook of Political and Social Indicators (with Karl Deutsch, Harold Lasswell, and Hayward Alker, 1964, Spanish edition 1969).
- Trends in World Politics (1965).
- World Politics in the General Assembly (with Hayward Alker, 1965).
- International Regions and the International System (1967).
- Economic Theories of International Politics (editor and contributor; Chicago, IL: Markham, 1968).
- What Price Vigilance? The Burdens of National Defense (1970). Gladys Kammerer Award from APSA for best book on U.S. public policy, 1971.
- No Clear and Present Danger: A Skeptical View of the United States Entry into World War II (1972; 25th anniversary edition, 1997).
- Peace, War, and Numbers (editor and contributor; 1972).
- Military Force and American Society (editor and contributor, with Alfred Stepan, 1973).
- Power and Community in World Politics (1974).
- Interest and Ideology: The Foreign Policy Beliefs of American Businessmen (with Elizabeth Hanson, 1975).
- Progress in Arms Control? Readings from SCIENTIFIC AMERICAN (editor and contributor, with Bruce Blair, 1979).
- From National Development to Global Community (editor and contributor, with Richard Merritt, 1981).
- World Politics: The Menu for Choice (with Harvey Starr, 1981; later editions 1985; 1989, 1992, 1996; also 2000, 2003, 2006 with David Kinsella as third author). Also Indian, Italian, Chinese, Russian, and Japanese versions of various editions.
- The Prisoners of Insecurity: Nuclear Deterrence, the Arms Race, and Arms Control. 1983. Archived from the original on 2008-06-01 – via Questia.
- Arms Control and the Arms Race: Readings from SCIENTIFIC AMERICAN (editor and contributor, with Fred Chernoff; 1985).
- Choices in World Politics: Sovereignty and Interdependence (editor and contributor, with Harvey Starr and Richard Stoll, 1989).
- Controlling the Sword: The Democratic Governance of National Security (1990).
- Grasping the Democratic Peace: Principles for a Post-Cold War World. 1993. ISBN 0-691-03346-3. Archived from the original on 2012-10-21 – via Questia.
- The Once and Future Security Council (editor and contributor, 1997).
- The Kantian Peace: The Pacific Benefits of Democracy, Interdependence, and International Organizations, 1885-1992 (with John R. Oneal, 1999).
- Triangulating Peace: Democracy, Interdependence, and International Organizations (with John R. Oneal, 2001).
- Governance, Accountability, and the Future of the Catholic Church (editor and contributor, with Francis Oakley, 2004).
- New Directions for International Relations: Confronting the Method of Analysis Problem (editor and contributor, with Alex Mintz, 2005).
- Purpose and Policy in the Global Community (2006).
- International Security and Conflict (editor, forthcoming 2008).

=== Articles ===
Russett, Bruce (November 1993). "Peace among Democracies". Scientific American. 269 (5): 92. Bibcode:1993SciAm.269e.120R. doi:10.1038/scientificamerican1193-120.
