= National Territorial Commanders Committee =

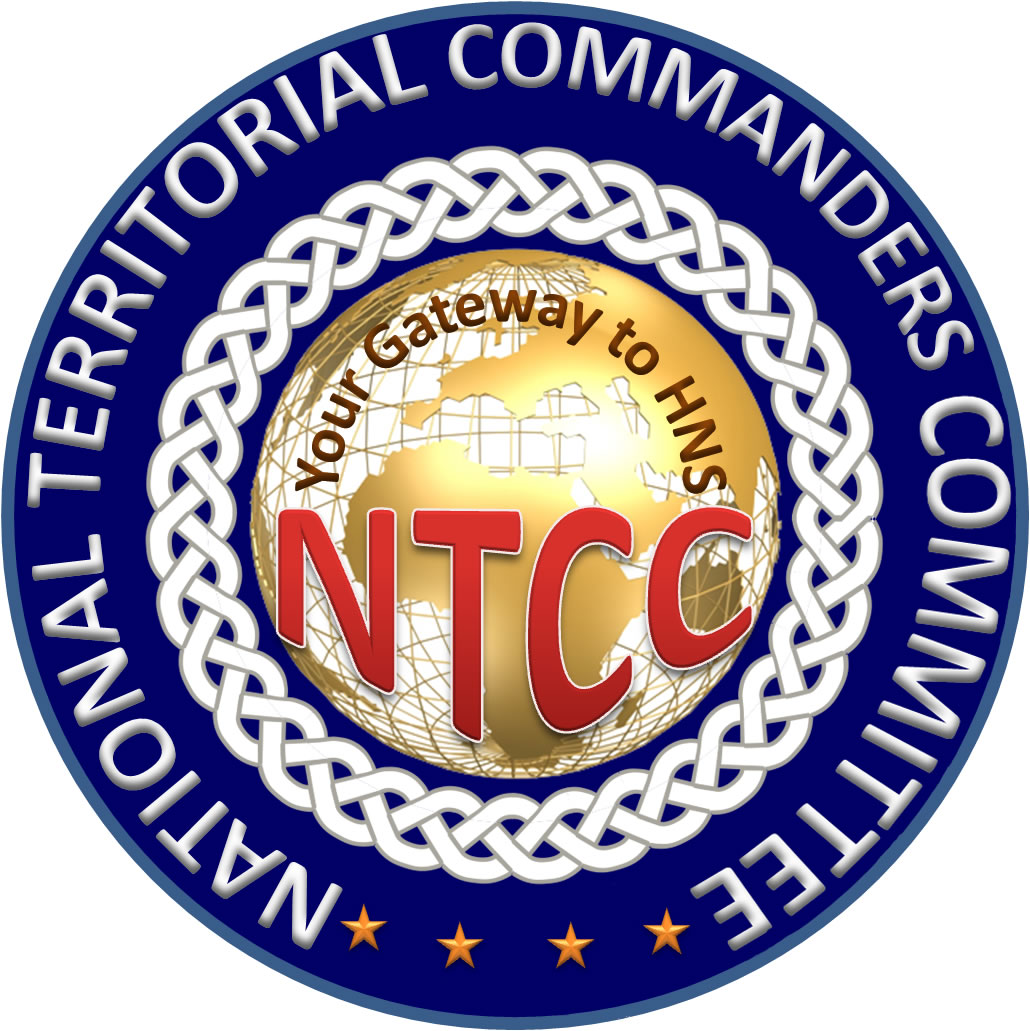
NTCC Logo

The National Territorial Commanders Committee, or NTCC, is an informal forum for the exchange of information and for the consultation on multinational issues of mutual (military) interest. The NTCC coordinates host nation support and establishes guidelines to facilitate reception, staging and onward movement (RSOM) of transiting or operating allied and partner nation forces; coordinates operational access to national lines of communication; and coordinates delivery of defense and intergovernmental resources for operations, exercises and contingencies of sending nations.

The NTCC was first established in 1986 by six nations, and today it is composed of senior logistical military commanders and representatives from more than 20 allied and partner nations. The NTCC is staffed with observers from the North Atlantic Treaty Organization (NATO), Supreme Headquarters Allied Powers Europe(SHAPE), the European Union(EU) military staff and the United States European Command (EUCOM). The organization seeks to improve host nation cooperation and enhance NTCC member capabilities to responsively meet allied and partner sending nation support requirements for exercises, contingencies or operations.

== Mission and Vision ==
The NTCC mission is to streamline host nation support (HNS) coordination between member nations. The organization's vision is to be the leading multinational network for host nation support.

== Focus Areas ==
Through information sharing and capturing lessons learned, the members of the NTCC seek to transform operational processes to create a system of best practices to govern host nation support procedures and capabilities.

The primary NTCC focus areas are:

- Enhance North Atlantic Treaty Organization (NATO) integration with allies and partner forces
- Facilitate logistics change initiatives
- Enable knowledge/information sharing
- Improve host nation support capabilities, capacity, and activity
- Assist partner nations in planning, managing and executing logistics support

== Role ==
The NTCC does not replace bilateral or joint agreements between nations, nor does its capabilities supersede those of NATO or other formal documents/organizations.

Members seek to exchange and share information on issues of common concern, with the end goal of streamlining processes and procedures to ensure rapid response of host nation support during military operations, exercises, crises and in times of peace. The experts of the NTCC facilitate the development and acceptance of bilateral and multilateral logistics arrangements/agreements and liaise with organizations across the spectrum on matters related/adjacent to host nation support matters.

Through participation in multinational logistics planning conferences, NATO Schools and in allied and joint exercises, the NTCC helps bolster regional and partner confidence in planning, managing and implementing host nation logistics support.

== Organization ==
The Commanders of the NTCC meet annually for the National Territorial Commanders Committee Meeting. During this meeting, the Commanders vote on issues of importance to the organization and affirm/execute the guidance and tasks brought forward by the NTCC Steering Committee.

The NTCC Steering Committee meets twice annually and is composed of national single points of contact (SPOCs) who liaise on behalf of their commanders/nations on the day-to-day business of host nation support logistics. The steering committee is chaired by a permanent secretary (PERMSEC) who coordinates the issues of the NTCC and SPOCs in accordance with the official NTCC Terms of Reference.

There are three levels of participation in the NTCC Forum:

- Members: Belong to the signing nations and have full voting status in the NTCC. Members must be unanimously voted in by the member nations of the forum
- Observers: Organizations, agencies or commands who can observe and contribute to the NTCC but possess no voting rights
- Invitees: Invited to observe the activities and procedures of the NTCC, with the option of seeking full membership through official vote by NTCC Members
