= Compellence =

Form of coercion

Compellence is a form of coercion that attempts to get an actor (such as a state) to change its behavior through threats to use force or the actual use of limited force. Compellence can be more clearly described as "a political-diplomatic strategy that aims to influence an adversary's will or incentive structure. It is a strategy that combines threats of force, and, if necessary, the limited and selective use of force in discrete and controlled increments, in a bargaining strategy that includes positive inducements. The aim is to induce an adversary to comply with one's demands, or to negotiate the most favorable compromise possible, while simultaneously managing the crisis to prevent unwanted military escalation."

As distinguished from deterrence theory, which is a strategy aimed at maintaining the status quo (dissuading adversaries from undertaking an action), compellence entails efforts to change the status quo (persuading an opponent to change their behavior). Compellence has been characterized as harder to successfully implement than deterrence. Compellence can entail strategies to punish an adversary, raise the risk for an adversary, or deny the adversary from achieving their objectives. Successful instances of compellence in one case may have a deterrent effect on other states, whereas a reputation for a lack of resolve may undermine general deterrence and future compellence.

== Background ==
Compellence is one form of coercion. Some scholars conflate coercion and compellence.

Compellence typically entails efforts to change the decision calculus of an adversary by manipulating the costs and benefits of certain actions. Daniel Byman and Matthew Waxman define compellence as "getting the adversary to act a certain way via anything short of brute force; the adversary must still have the capacity of organized violence but choose not to exercise it". Coercion strategy "relies on the threat of future military force to influence an adversary's decision making but may also include limited uses of actual force". Joseph Nye emphasizes that compellence depends upon the credibility and the cost of the threat. "If a threat is not credible, it may fail to produce acceptance and it may lead to costs to the reputation of the coercing state. In general, threats are costly when they fail, not only in encouraging resistance in the target, but also in negatively influencing third parties observing the outcome."

The term deterrence is differentiated from compellence. In his influential work, Arms and Influence, Thomas Schelling puts forth a general concept of coercion theory as it emerges beyond deterrence. According to Schelling, deterrence is merely a passive threat aimed at keeping an adversary from acting. It is only a threat. "Initiative is placed on the opponent to take the first action triggering a response from the coercer." Schelling believes that deterrence does not present "a comprehensive picture of coercion, leading Schelling to introduce the concept of compellence".

'Compellence', in contrast to 'deterrence', shifts the initiative for the first action to the coercer. While deterrence means waiting passively in hope of not seeing a response, compellence is active, thereby, "inducing his withdrawal, or his acquiescence, or his collaboration by an action that threatens to hurt". When differentiating between deterrence and compellence, deterrence can be described as "drawing a line in the sand" and acting only if the adversary crosses it; in contrast, compellence "requires that the punishment be administered until the other acts rather than if he acts" as in deterrence. "Coercion composed of both compellence and deterrence is about action and inaction." Alexander L. George, a scholar of international relations and former professor of political science at Stanford University, was a pioneer in the field of political psychology. Like Schelling before him, Alexander George worked to create a diplomatic strategy of coercion; his was the theory of compellence. Unlike Schelling, George's theory of 'compellence' is different than Schelling's 'coercive warfare', in that he believed that compellence was "a subset of coercion and compellence". He viewed it as encompassing "defensive" compellent actions only: to force a target to stop or reverse action already taken, rather than an offensive goal of forcing them to do something ... Compellence essentially is the embodiment of a "carrot and stick" philosophy: motivation is used to induce a target to submit to your wishes, while appearing threatening at the same time".

== Types of coercive strategy ==
=== Alexander George's types ===
According to Alexander George, compellence seeks to achieve three objectives. First, it attempts to persuade an adversary to turn away from its goal. Second, it seeks to convince an adversary to reverse an action already taken. Third, it may persuade an adversary to make "fundamental changes in its government". When constructing a compellence strategy, policymakers must consider certain variables or "empty boxes" that must be filled. They must decide "what to demand of the opponent; whether and how to create a sense of urgency for compliance with demand; whether and what kind of punishment to threaten for noncompliance; and whether to rely solely on the threat of punishment or also to offer conditional inducements of a positive character to secure acceptance of the demand".

Alexander George developed a framework in which a number of "variants" or methods of using compellence could be deployed to achieve these objectives. These variants include the following:

1. Ultimatum
2. Tacit ultimatum
3. Try-and-see
4. Gradual turning of the screw

The first variant of the 'compellence' strategy is the classic 'ultimatum'. An ultimatum itself has three distinct components: "a demand on the opponent; a time limit or sense of urgency for compliance with the demand; and a threat of punishment for noncompliance that is both credible to the opponent and sufficiently potent to impress upon him that compliance is preferable".

The second variant of compellence, 'tacit ultimatum', is similar to 'ultimatum' except that it doesn't set forth an explicit time limit.

The third variant of compellence, the 'try-and-see', addresses strictly the first component of the 'ultimatum' variant, "a demand on the opponent". There is no time limit set, no sense of urgency conveyed, instead the coercer makes a single threat or takes a single action "to persuade the opponent before threatening or taking another step".

Finally, the 'gradual turning of the screw' approach is similar to the 'try-and-see' method in that it makes a threat but then "relies the threat of a gradual, incremental increase of coercive pressure rather than threatening large escalation to strong, decisive military action if the opponent does not comply".

=== Other types ===
Thomas Schelling and Robert Pape distinguished between coercive strategies that sought to:

1. Punish: Raise the costs for the adversary
2. Risk: Raise the probability of future costs for the adversary
3. Deny: Prevent the adversary from obtaining their objectives.

Pape also added the strategy of decapitation, which typically entails targeting leaders. Alexander Downes and Kathryn McNabb Cochran distinguish between two punishment strategies: (i) Coercive victimization (which raises the costs of war for a government by targeting its civilians) and (ii) Eliminationist victimization (which removes civilians from territory).

=== Intrawar compellence ===
Intrawar compellence refers to compellence within the context of a war: a war has broken out but the actors are still seeking to coerce the adversary to take a certain action. According to Thomas Schelling, "War is always a bargaining process" where actors engage in threats and counter-threats, as well as proposals and counter-proposals. According to Schelling, the bargaining process appears most prominently in the context of "limited wars" where actors hold the full use of force in reserve so as to threaten the adversary to make concessions.

== Requirements for success ==
Among the numerous theories on compellence, Peter Viggo Jakobsen's (1998) ideal policy succinctly identifies the four key conditions the coercer must meet to maximize the chance of success to stop or undo acts of aggression:

1. A threat of force to defeat the opponent or deny him his objectives quickly with little cost.
2. A deadline for compliance.
3. An assurance to the adversary against future demands.
4. An offer of inducements for compliance.

The first requirement in Jakobsen's 'ideal policy' is to make the threat so great that non-compliance will be too costly for the resisting actors. The second requirement demands that after maximizing the credibility of the threat, the coercer must set a specific deadline, as failure to set a deadline for compliance "is likely to be interpreted as evidence that the coercer lacks the will to implement the threat". Assurance against new demands must also be carried out for greater chance of success. Jakobsen points out that the incentive to comply with the coercer's demands will be significantly downgraded if the resisting actor fears compliance will merely invite more demands. The last requirement for successful coercion is the effective use of inducements, which are important facilitators used to give more credibility and assurance.

According to Richard Ned Lebow, a credible threat entails:

1. A formulated commitment
2. A communication of that commitment to the other side
3. The capability to back up the commitment
4. The will to back up the commitment

According to Robert Art, the perquisites for compellence success are:

1. Clear objectives
2. Strong motivation
3. Domestic and international support
4. Strong leadership
5. Clearly stated demands
6. Creation of a sense of urgency in the other state's mind
7. Making the target fear unacceptable escalation
8. Asymmetry in motivation

=== Credibility ===
Much of the scholarship on compellence focuses on the credibility of coercive threats as a key component of the success of compellence. According to Anne Sartori, states rarely seek to obtain goals through bluffing, because doing so undermines their reputation in future crises. Survey experiment data from Barbara Walter and Dustin Tingley confirm the findings of Sartori's study, as they find that people "invest more heavily in reputation building if they believe a game will be repeated many times."

Credibility (or reputation) refers to the degree to which an actor is expected to uphold their commitments based on past behavior. In terms of credible compellence, credibility entails that defiance will be met with punishment, and that compliance will be met with restraint. One of the main problems in compellence is that it is hard to credibly signal that compliance will not lead to punishment. Scholars have argued that when great powers increase their power, their credibility to engage in restraint decreases.

To enhance the credibility of threats, some scholars argue that audience costs are effective in doing so. Other scholars dispute that audience costs enhance credibility. Military mobilizations during a crisis may bolster compellent threats, but scholars dispute whether it is because it "ties the hands of the leader" or because it alters the local military balance of power.

Some scholars question whether credibility or reputation matters in international disputes.

=== Nuclear weapons ===
Scholars have debated whether nuclear weapons provide states with an advantage in compelling other states. Matthew Kroenig has argued that nuclear superiority enhances the probability of success in a bargaining dispute. Todd Sechser and Matthew Fuhrmann dispute that nuclear weapons have compellence utility, as they find no evidence in their dataset on compellent threats that nuclear weapons increase compellence success. A 2023 study found that a state with nuclear weapons is less likely to be targeted by non-nuclear states, but that a state with nuclear weapons is not less likely to target other nuclear states in low-level conflict.

== Case studies ==
=== Success ===
Scholars have found that compellence is less likely to be successful than deterrence. Studies have indicated that "punishment" strategies that target civilians tend to be ineffective.

President John F. Kennedy used compellence successfully in 1962 when he was able to bring about a peaceful resolution to the Cuban Missile Crisis and avert possible warfare between the United States and the Soviet Union. When Kennedy learned of the Soviet Union's attempt to deploy forty-two medium-range and twenty-four intermediate-range ballistic missiles into Cuba, he established a naval blockade and threatened an invasion of Cuba with force to remove the missiles already there.

Instead of resorting to a strictly military strategy to forcibly remove the missiles, Kennedy decided to use compellence. He initiated this strategy by first using the 'Try-and-See' approach. The giant naval blockade, along with a massive buildup of U.S. military forces, was a message to Nikita Khrushchev to persuade him that the U.S. was able and willing to use force if needed to remove this missile threat from Cuba. The blockade limited the showdown to Kennedy and Khrushchev rather than develop into all-out war. Because of Kennedy's tough naval blockade, Khrushchev "directed all Soviet vessels carrying missiles and other military equipment to Cuba to immediately turn back".

To intensify the compellence strategy, Kennedy shifted from the 'Try-and-See' approach to a hybrid of a virtual 'ultimatum' and a carrot-and-the stick approach. Kennedy addressed the sense of urgency about the growing hostile situation by standing firm and tightening the naval blockade as well as conveying to Khrushchev the continued threat of a possible invasion of Cuba. As a result of Kennedy's successful use of compellence added to negotiated concessions, Khrushchev agreed to remove missiles in place and to discontinue the deployment of new missiles into Cuba while the U.S. agreed to remove its Jupiter missiles stationed in Turkey and to call off any invasion of Cuba.

=== Failure ===
During the 1990–91 Gulf War, compellence failed to persuade Saddam Hussein to exit Kuwait and move his military forces back to Iraq; though the use of deterrence effectively convinced the Iraqi president that he could not invade further south into Saudi Arabia, it did little to expel him from Kuwait. Initially, the Bush administration along with the United Nations issued sanctions to pressure Iraq to withdraw troops inside Kuwait. The UN Security Council placed economic sanctions by imposing an embargo on Iraq's imports and exports. This initial stage of the crisis was the United States' attempt to use the coercive diplomatic variant, 'Gradual Turning of the Screw' to apply pressure on Saddam Hussein to comply to the demands to leave Kuwait.

Then the Bush administration, along with the UN Security Council, used the variant 'ultimatum' by setting a deadline of January 15, 1991, for the withdrawal of Iraqi troops from Kuwait. When this deadline came and passed, without Saddam Hussein's compliance, Operation Desert Storm commenced and military force was used to remove Iraq's forces from Kuwait. Despite the massive build-up of U.S. forces along the Saudi Arabia/Kuwait border, economic sanctions, and a declared deadline for withdrawal, Saddam Hussein failed to remove his forces. In this instance, compellence failed, leading to the Gulf War, which concluded with the United States and coalition forces succeeding in removing Saddam Hussein's troops from Kuwait. Thus, when implementing compellence not only the benefits but also the aftermath must be considered. Especially in the 21st century, every nation is interdependent so other forces by state actors may affect a nation's diplomacy.

Some have suggested that the 2021–2022 Russo-Ukrainian crisis was an attempt at compellence, which resulted in the 2022 Russian Invasion of Ukraine when Ukraine failed to accede to Russia's demands. The invasion was also widely regarded as a failure to achieve Putin's goals though many questions remain as to what those goals were.

== See also ==
- Gunboat diplomacy
- Monopoly on violence – the domestic equivalent of compellence directed against citizens rather than states or non-governmental organizations
