= Emilie M. Hafner-Burton =

American academic and author

Emilie M Hafner-Burton
- Born: 18 May 1973
- Education: Seattle University; University of Wisconsin—Madison
- Occupations: Academic, author
- Spouse: David Victor

Emilie M. Hafner-Burton (born May 18, 1973) is a professor at the UC San Diego School of Global Policy and Strategy (formerly the Graduate School of International Relations and Pacific Studies or IR/PS) and director of the school’s laboratory on international law and regulation. She is co-director of the Future of Democracy Initiative at the University of California's Institute for Global Conflict and Cooperation (IGCC).

She is the author of Making Human Rights a Reality (2013).

== Education ==
Hafner-Burton received a B.A. in political science and philosophy from Seattle University in 1995, when she was also awarded the Story Award for the highest student achievement in Women’s Studies and the Kennedy Award for the highest student achievement in Political Science. She was a recipient of a National Education Achievement Foundation Scholarship Award in 1994.

After graduation she apprenticed as a blacksmith before winning a scholarship which involved travelling to Geneva, Switzerland where she worked for an "international nongovernmental organization dedicated to the promotion of human rights and disarmament." This involved spending time at the United Nations, which in turn led her towards a career in political science.

She earned an M.A. in political science from University of Wisconsin—Madison in 1999 and a Ph.D. in political science from the University of Wisconsin—Madison in 2003. During her Ph.D. studies she was a recipient of the following fellowships, grants and prizes:

- European Union Center fellowship, University of Wisconsin—Madison (2000)
- MacArthur Consortium, global studies scholarship, University of Wisconsin (2000 to 2001)
- Center for International Security and Cooperation, MacArthur fellow, Stanford University (2001 to 2003)
- Graduate Student Council, Vilas travel grant, University of Wisconsin—Madison (2002)
- Scott Kloeck-Jenson International pre-dissertation grant, University of Wisconsin (2002)
- National Science Foundation, dissertation improvement grant in political science (2002)
- University Dissertator fellowship, University of Wisconsin—Madison (2002 to 2003)
- American Political Science Association Prize for best dissertation in human rights (2004)
- American Political Science Association Helen Dwight Reid Award for best dissertation in international relations, law, and politics (2005)

She was awarded an honorary M.A. from Oxford University in 2003.

== Grants, fellowships, awards and gifts ==
Hafner-Burton has been recipient of the following:

- Women’s International League for Peace and Freedom (WILPF) International Fellowship in Disarmament and Development (1997 to 1998)
- Women in International Security: Graduate symposium on international security. Washington D.C. (1999)
- European Networking Series, British Council (1999)
- Postdoctoral Research Prize, Oxford University, Nuffield College (2003 to 2006)
- International Studies Association Workshop Grant, for “Preventing Human Rights Abuse” (2006)
- Princeton University:
  - Center for Globalization and Governance for Intergovernmental organizations in action (2006)
  - Dean of Faculty book grant (2007)
  - Woodrow Wilson School for Public and International Affairs grant (2008)
  - Bobst Center for Peace and Justice project grant (2008)
  - Dean of Faculty project grant (2008)
  - Class of 1934 University Preceptor, Woodrow Wilson School (2009 to 2012)
- Karl Deutsch Award which is presented annually to a scholar under the age of 40 who is judged to have made, through a body of publications, the most significant contribution to the study of international relations and peace research by the International Studies Association (2012)
- International Studies Association, best book award (2015)

== Books ==
- Hafner-Burton, Emilie M. (2005). Trading Human Rights: How Preferential Trade Agreements Influence Government Repression. New York, USA: Routledge. ISBN 9781315254234.
- Hafner-Burton, Emilie M. (2009). Forced to Be Good: Why Trade Agreements Boost Human Rights. Cornell, USA: Cornell University Press. ISBN 9780801457463.
- Hafner-Burton, Emilie M. (2013). Making Human Rights a Reality. Princeton, USA: Princeton University Press. ISBN 9780691155364.
- Burton, Howard (2020). Improving Human Rights: A Conversation with Emilie Hafner-Burton. Open Agenda Publishing Inc.

== Articles ==
Hafner-Burton has contributed to journals including:

- American Journal of International Law
- American Journal of Sociology
- British Journal of Political Science
- Comparative European Politics
- Conflict Management and Peace Science
- European Journal of International Relations
- Feminist Legal Studies
- International Organization
- International Sociology
- Journal of Conflict Resolution
- Journal of European Public Policy
- Journal of Peace Research
- Perspectives on Politics
- PS – Political Science & Politics
- World Politics

She contributed to Networked Politics: Agency, Power, and Government edited by Miles Kahler, pub. Cornell University Press, 2009.
