= Jessica L.P. Weeks =

American political scientist

- Title: Professor and H. Douglas Weaver Chair in Diplomacy and International Relations

Academic background
- Education: Ph.D. political science, Stanford University, 2009; M.A. International History and Politics, Graduate Institute of International and Development Studies, 2003; B.A. political science, Ohio State University, 2001
- Thesis: Leaders, Foreign Policy, and Accountability in Non-Democracies (2009)
- Doctoral advisor: Kenneth Schultz

Academic work
- Discipline: political science
- Sub-discipline: intersection of domestic politics and international relations
- Institutions: University of Wisconsin-Madison; Cornell University
- Notable works: Dictators at War and Peace
- Website: http://www.jessicalpweeks.com

Jessica L.P. Weeks is an American political scientist. She is Professor and H. Douglas Weaver Chair in Diplomacy and International Relations in the Department of Political Science at the University of Wisconsin-Madison.

== Areas of research ==
She is known for her work on the intersection of domestic politics and international relations. Her work on audience costs in authoritarian regimes is among the most assigned work in international relations graduate training in United States universities.

== Education ==
She has a PhD in political science from Stanford University (2009), a Master’s degree in international history from the Graduate Institute of International and Development Studies (2003), and a B.A. in political science from Ohio State University (2001). Her doctoral dissertation was titled "Leaders, Foreign Policy, and Accountability in Non-Democracies" and advised by Kenneth Schultz.

== Select publications ==
- Dictators at War and Peace. 2014. Cornell Studies in Security Affairs, Cornell University Press.
- A number of articles and book chapters — list available on WorldCat

== Awards ==
- Karl Deutsch Award (2018) — for prominent scholars in international relations under age 40 or within ten years of defending their doctoral dissertation
