= Deterrence theory =

Military strategy during the Cold War with regard to the use of nuclear weapons

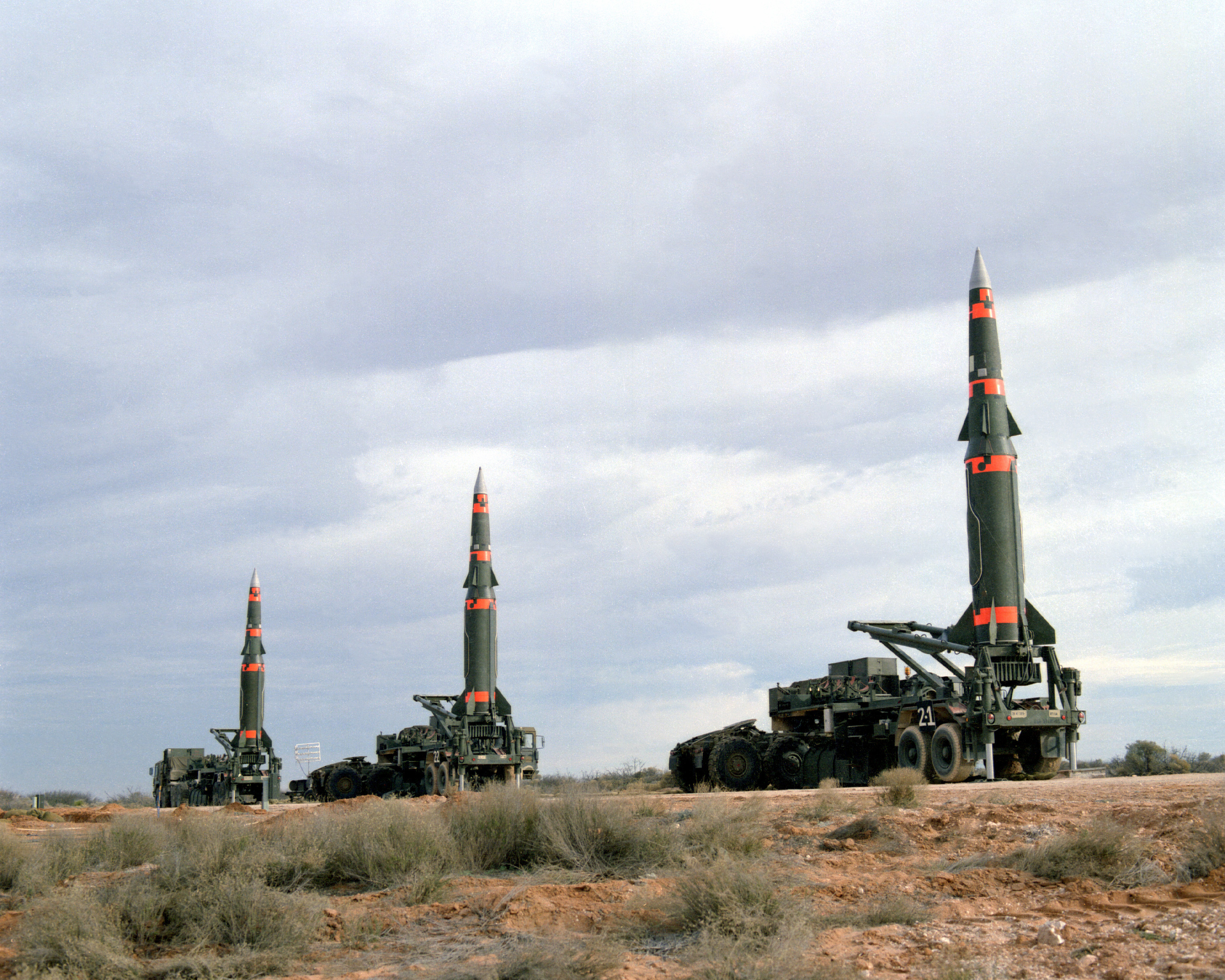
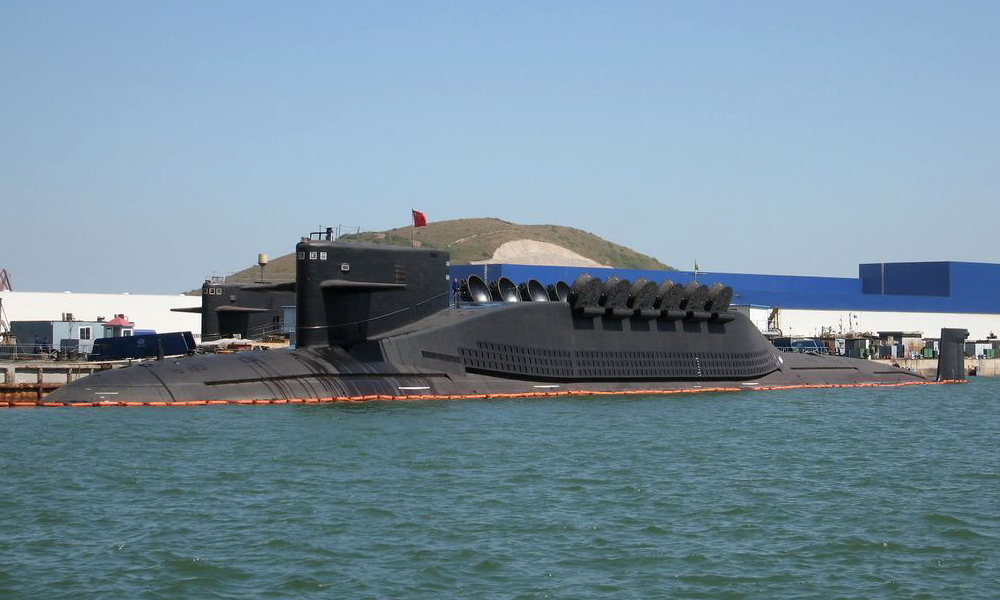
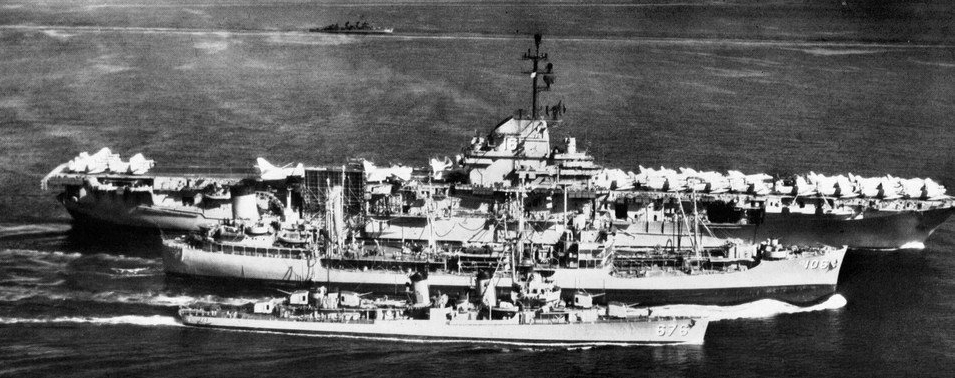
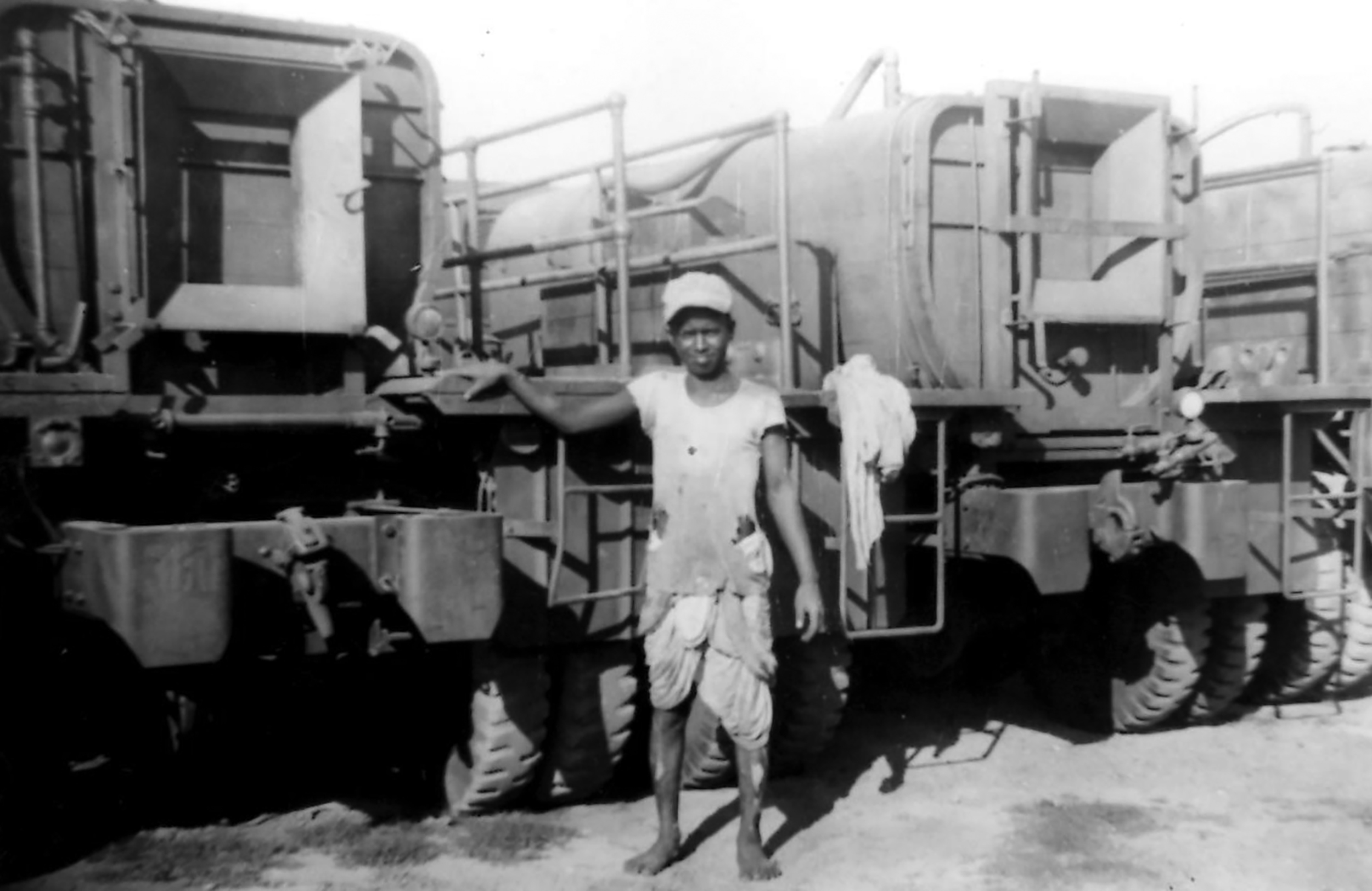
From top, left to right
1. Pershing II IRBMs, deployed to Europe as a form of nuclear deterrence
2. The Type 094, one of ballistic missile submarines, are among the most credible forms of nuclear deterrence
3. The USS Lexington carrier group provided conventional deterrence during the Second Taiwan Strait Crisis
4. US chemical weapons storage during World War II, which deterred its use by Axis forces

Deterrence theory is the scholarship and practice of how threats of using force by one party can convince another party to refrain from initiating some other course of action. The central problem of deterrence revolves around how to credibly threaten military action or nuclear punishment on the adversary despite its costs to the deterrer. Deterrence in an international relations context is the application of deterrence theory to avoid conflict.

Deterrence is widely defined as any use of threats (implicit or explicit) or limited force intended to dissuade an actor from taking an action (i.e. maintain the status quo). Deterrence is unlike compellence, which is the attempt to drive an actor (such as a state) to take an action (i.e. alter the status quo). Both are forms of coercion. Compellence has been characterized as harder to successfully implement than deterrence. Deterrence also tends to be distinguished from defense or the use of full force in wartime.

Deterrence is most likely to be successful when a prospective attacker believes that the probability of success is low and the costs of attack are high. Central problems of deterrence include the credible communication of threats and assurance. Deterrence does not necessarily require military superiority.

The topic gained increased prominence as a military strategy during the Cold War with regard to the use of nuclear weapons. It is related to but distinct from the concept of mutual assured destruction, according to which a full-scale nuclear attack on a power with second-strike capability would devastate both parties. The internationalization of deterrence, including via nuclear sharing and nuclear umbrellas, became a key strategy for states seeking to project power while mitigating direct conflict. Examples include the Cuban Missile Crisis and NATO Double-Track Decision.

"General deterrence" is considered successful when an actor who might otherwise take an action refrains from doing so due to the consequences that the deterrer is perceived likely to take. "Immediate deterrence" is considered successful when an actor seriously contemplating immediate military force or action refrains from doing so. Scholars distinguish between "extended deterrence" (the protection of allies) and "direct deterrence" (protection of oneself). Rational deterrence theory holds that an attacker will be deterred if they believe that:

(Probability of deterrer carrying out deterrent threat × Costs if threat carried out) > (Probability of the attacker accomplishing the action × Benefits of the action)

This model is frequently simplified in game-theoretic terms as:

Costs × P(Costs) > Benefits × P(Benefits)

== History ==
=== World War II ===
During World War II, some historians have argued that deterrence prevented the Western Allies and Axis from extensive and direct chemical warfare with each other, as had been used in World War I. Nonetheless, Nazi Germany used chemical weapons during the Siege of Sevastopol, Siege of Odessa, and Battle of the Kerch Peninsula, while Imperial Japan frequently used chemical weapons against Chinese troops. Conversely, during the Nuremberg trials, Hermann Göring stated that initiating an exchange of chemical weapons during the Operation Overlord would have immobilized the Wehrmacht, which widely relied on horse-drawn transport, and a suitable gas mask for horses had not been designed.

=== Cold War ===
==== Concept ====
While the concept of deterrence precedes the Cold War, it was during the Cold War that the concept evolved into a clearly articulated objective in strategic planning and diplomacy, with considerable analysis by scholars.

Most of the innovative work on deterrence theory occurred from the late 1940s to mid-1960s. Historically, scholarship on deterrence has tended to focus on nuclear deterrence. Since the end of the Cold War, there has been an extension of deterrence scholarship to areas that are not specifically about nuclear weapons.

NATO was founded in 1949 with deterring aggression as one of its goals.

A distinction is sometimes made between nuclear deterrence and "conventional deterrence."

The two most prominent deterrent strategies are "denial" (denying the attacker the benefits of attack) and "punishment" (inflicting costs on the attacker).

The lesson of Munich, where appeasement failed, has contributed to deterrence theory. In the words of scholars Fredrik Logevall and Kenneth Osgood, "Munich and appeasement have become among the dirtiest words in American politics, synonymous with naivete and weakness, and signifying a craven willingness to barter away the nation's vital interests for empty promises." They claimed that the success of U.S. foreign policy often depends upon a president withstanding "the inevitable charges of appeasement that accompany any decision to negotiate with hostile powers.

==== Examples ====
In November 1945, General Curtis LeMay, who led American air raids on Japan during World War II, said in a speech to the Ohio Society of New York that since "No air attack, once it is launched, can be completely stopped", his country needed an air force that could immediately retaliate: "If we are prepared it may never come. It is not immediately conceivable that any nation will dare to attack us if we are prepared".

In pursuit of nuclear deterrence, the superpowers of the USSR and U.S. engaged in a nuclear arms race. Warheads themselves evolved from fission weapons to thermonuclear weapons, and were extensively miniaturized for both strategic and tactical use. Nuclear weapons delivery was equally important, such as the perceived bomber gap and missile gap. Deterrence was a primary factor in the ultimate proliferation of nuclear weapons to ten nations in total. Generally, this was the form of the threat perceived from a nearby recently nuclear-armed neighbor. In the case of the nuclear programs of Israel and South Africa, deterrence was against the threat of conventional attack.

Additionally, chemical weapons were a component of deterrence for both sides of the Cold War, and large stockpiles were maintained until their destruction began following the 1993 Chemical Weapons Convention. Offensive biological weapons programs were pursued by both countries in the first two decades of the Cold War, but the United States program was ended by president Richard Nixon in 1969.

== Concept ==
The concept of deterrence can be defined as the use of threats in limited force by one party to convince another party to refrain from initiating some course of action. In Arms and Influence (1966), Schelling offers a broader definition of deterrence, as he defines it as "to prevent from action by fear of consequences." Glenn Snyder also offers a broad definition of deterrence, as he argues that deterrence involves both the threat of sanction and the promise of reward.

A threat serves as a deterrent to the extent that it convinces its target not to carry out the intended action because of the costs and losses that target would incur. In international security, a policy of deterrence generally refers to threats of military retaliation directed by the leaders of one state to the leaders of another in an attempt to prevent the other state from resorting to the use of military force in pursuit of its foreign policy goals.

As outlined by Huth, a policy of deterrence can fit into two broad categories: preventing an armed attack against a state's own territory (known as direct deterrence) or preventing an armed attack against another state (known as extended deterrence). Situations of direct deterrence often occur if there is a territorial dispute between neighboring states in which major powers like the United States do not directly intervene. On the other hand, situations of extended deterrence often occur when a great power becomes involved. The latter case has generated most interest in academic literature. Building on the two broad categories, Huth goes on to outline that deterrence policies may be implemented in response to a pressing short-term threat (known as immediate deterrence) or as strategy to prevent a military conflict or short-term threat from arising (known as general deterrence).

A successful deterrence policy must be considered in military terms but also political terms: International relations, foreign policy and diplomacy. In military terms, deterrence success refers to preventing state leaders from issuing military threats and actions that escalate peacetime diplomatic and military co-operation into a crisis or militarized confrontation that threatens armed conflict and possibly war.The prevention of crises of wars, however, is not the only aim of deterrence. In addition, defending states must be able to resist the political and the military demands of a potential attacking nation. If armed conflict is avoided at the price of diplomatic concessions to the maximum demands of the potential attacking nation under the threat of war, it cannot be claimed that deterrence has succeeded.

Furthermore, as Jentleson et al. argue, two key sets of factors for successful deterrence are important: a defending state strategy that balances credible coercion and deft diplomacy consistent with the three criteria of proportionality, reciprocity, and coercive credibility and minimizes international and domestic constraints and the extent of an attacking state's vulnerability as shaped by its domestic political and economic conditions. In broad terms, a state wishing to implement a strategy of deterrence is most likely to succeed if the costs of noncompliance that it can impose on and the benefits of compliance it can offer to another state are greater than the benefits of noncompliance and the costs of compliance.

Deterrence theory holds that nuclear weapons are intended to deter other states from attacking with their nuclear weapons, through the promise of retaliation and possibly mutually assured destruction. Nuclear deterrence can also be applied to an attack by conventional forces. For example, the doctrine of massive retaliation threatened to launch US nuclear weapons in response to Soviet attacks.

A successful nuclear deterrent requires a country to preserve its ability to retaliate by responding before its own weapons are destroyed or ensuring a second-strike capability. A nuclear deterrent is sometimes composed of a nuclear triad, as in the case of the nuclear weapons owned by the United States, Russia, China and India. Other countries, such as the United Kingdom and France, have only sea-based and air-based nuclear weapons.

=== Proportionality ===
Jentleson et al. provides further detail in relation to those factors. Proportionality refers to the relationship between the defending state's scope and nature of the objectives being pursued and the instruments available for use to pursue them. The more the defending state demands of another state, the higher that state's costs of compliance and the greater need for the defending state's strategy to increase the costs of noncompliance and the benefits of compliance. That is a challenge, as deterrence is by definition a strategy of limited means. George (1991) goes on to explain that deterrence sometimes goes beyond threats to the actual use of military force, but if force is actually used, it must be limited and fall short of full-scale use to succeed.

The main source of disproportionality is an objective that goes beyond policy change to regime change, which has been seen in Libya, Iraq, and North Korea. There, defending states have sought to change the leadership of a state and to policy changes relating primarily to their nuclear weapons programs.

=== Reciprocity ===
Secondly, Jentleson et al. outlines that reciprocity involves an explicit understanding of linkage between the defending state's carrots and the attacking state's concessions. The balance lies in not offering too little, too late or for too much in return and not offering too much, too soon, or for too little return.

=== Coercive credibility ===
Finally, coercive credibility requires that in addition to calculations about costs and benefits of co-operation, the defending state convincingly conveys to the attacking state that failure to co-operate has consequences. Threats, uses of force, and other coercive instruments such as economic sanctions must be sufficiently credible to raise the attacking state's perceived costs of noncompliance. A defending state having a superior military capability or economic strength in itself is not enough to ensure credibility. Indeed, all three elements of a balanced deterrence strategy are more likely to be achieved if other major international actors like the UN or NATO are supportive, and opposition within the defending state's domestic politics is limited.

The other important considerations outlined by Jentleson et al. that must be taken into consideration is the domestic political and economic conditions in the attacking state affecting its vulnerability to deterrence policies and the attacking state's ability to compensate unfavourable power balances. The first factor is whether internal political support and regime security are better served by defiance, or there are domestic political gains to be made from improving relations with the defending state. The second factor is an economic calculation of the costs that military force, sanctions, and other coercive instruments can impose and the benefits that trade and other economic incentives may carry. That is partly a function of the strength and flexibility of the attacking state's domestic economy and its capacity to absorb or counter the costs being imposed. The third factor is the role of elites and other key domestic political figures within the attacking state. To the extent that such actors' interests are threatened with the defending state's demands, they act to prevent or block the defending state's demands.

== Rational deterrence theory ==
One approach to theorizing about deterrence has entailed the use of rational choice and game-theoretic models of decision making (see game theory). Rational deterrence theory entails:

1. Rationality: actors are rational
2. Unitary actor assumption: actors are understood as unitary
3. Dyads: interactions tend to be between dyads (or triads) of states
4. Strategic interactions: actors consider the choices of other actors
5. Cost-benefit calculations: outcomes reflect actors' cost-benefit calculations

Deterrence theorists have consistently argued that deterrence success is more likely if a defending state's deterrent threat is credible to an attacking state. Huth outlines that a threat is considered credible if the defending state possesses both the military capabilities to inflict substantial costs on an attacking state in an armed conflict, and the attacking state believes that the defending state is resolved to use its available military forces. Huth goes on to explain the four key factors for consideration under rational deterrence theory: the military balance, signaling and bargaining power, reputations for resolve, interests at stake.

The American economist Thomas Schelling brought his background in game theory to the subject of studying international deterrence. Schelling's (1966) classic work on deterrence presents the concept that military strategy can no longer be defined as the science of military victory. Instead, it is argued that military strategy was now equally, if not more, the art of coercion, intimidation and deterrence. Schelling says the capacity to harm another state is now used as a motivating factor for other states to avoid it and influence another state's behavior. To be coercive or deter another state, violence must be anticipated and avoidable by accommodation. It can therefore be summarized that the use of the power to hurt as bargaining power is the foundation of deterrence theory and is most successful when it is held in reserve.

In an article celebrating Schelling's Nobel Memorial Prize for Economics, Michael Kinsley, Washington Post op‑ed columnist and one of Schelling's former students, anecdotally summarizes Schelling's reorientation of game theory thus: "[Y]ou're standing at the edge of a cliff, chained by the ankle to someone else. You'll be released, and one of you will get a large prize, as soon as the other gives in. How do you persuade the other guy to give in, when the only method at your disposal—threatening to push him off the cliff—would doom you both? Answer: You start dancing, closer and closer to the edge. That way, you don't have to convince him that you would do something totally irrational: plunge him and yourself off the cliff. You just have to convince him that you are prepared to take a higher risk than he is of accidentally falling off the cliff. If you can do that, you win."

=== Military balance ===
Deterrence is often directed against state leaders who have specific territorial goals that they seek to attain either by seizing disputed territory in a limited military attack or by occupying disputed territory after the decisive defeat of the adversary's armed forces. In either case, the strategic orientation of potential attacking states generally is for the short term and is driven by concerns about military cost and effectiveness. For successful deterrence, defending states need the military capacity to respond quickly and strongly to a range of contingencies. Deterrence often fails if either a defending state or an attacking state underestimates or overestimates the other's ability to undertake a particular course of action.

=== Signaling and bargaining power ===
The central problem for a state that seeks to communicate a credible deterrent threat by diplomatic or military actions is that all defending states have an incentive to act as if they are determined to resist an attack in the hope that the attacking state will back away from military conflict with a seemingly resolved adversary. If all defending states have such incentives, potential attacking states may discount statements made by defending states along with any movement of military forces as merely bluffs. In that regard, rational deterrence theorists have argued that costly signals are required to communicate the credibility of a defending state's resolve. Those are actions and statements that clearly increase the risk of a military conflict and also increase the costs of backing down from a deterrent threat. States that bluff are unwilling to cross a certain threshold of threat and military action for fear of committing themselves to an armed conflict.

=== Reputations for resolve ===
There are three different arguments that have been developed in relation to the role of reputations in influencing deterrence outcomes. The first argument focuses on a defending state's past behavior in international disputes and crises, which creates strong beliefs in a potential attacking state about the defending state's expected behaviour in future conflicts. The credibilities of a defending state's policies are arguably linked over time, and reputations for resolve have a powerful causal impact on an attacking state's decision whether to challenge either general or immediate deterrence. The second approach argues that reputations have a limited impact on deterrence outcomes because the credibility of deterrence is heavily determined by the specific configuration of military capabilities, interests at stake, and political constraints faced by a defending state in a given situation of attempted deterrence. The argument of that school of thought is that potential attacking states are not likely to draw strong inferences about a defending states resolve from prior conflicts because potential attacking states do not believe that a defending state's past behaviour is a reliable predictor of future behavior. The third approach is a middle ground between the first two approaches and argues that potential attacking states are likely to draw reputational inferences about resolve from the past behaviour of defending states only under certain conditions. The insight is the expectation that decisionmakers use only certain types of information when drawing inferences about reputations, and an attacking state updates and revises its beliefs when a defending state's unanticipated behavior cannot be explained by case-specific variables.

An example shows that the problem extends to the perception of the third parties as well as main adversaries and underlies the way in which attempts at deterrence can fail and even backfire if the assumptions about the others' perceptions are incorrect.

=== Interests at stake ===
Although costly signaling and bargaining power are more well established arguments in rational deterrence theory, the interests of defending states are not as well known. Attacking states may look beyond the short-term bargaining tactics of a defending state and seek to determine what interests are at stake for the defending state that would justify the risks of a military conflict. The argument is that defending states that have greater interests at stake in a dispute are more resolved to use force and more willing to endure military losses to secure those interests. Even less well-established arguments are the specific interests that are more salient to state leaders such as military interests and economic interests.

Furthermore, Huth argues that both supporters and critics of rational deterrence theory agree that an unfavorable assessment of the domestic and international status quo by state leaders can undermine or severely test the success of deterrence. In a rational choice approach, if the expected utility of not using force is reduced by a declining status quo position, deterrence failure is more likely since the alternative option of using force becomes relatively more attractive.

=== Tripwires ===
Tripwires entail that small forces are deployed abroad with the assumption that an attack on them will trigger a greater deployment of forces. Dan Reiter and Paul Poast have argued that tripwires do not deter aggression. Dan Altman has argued that tripwires do work to deter aggression, citing the Western deployment of forces to Berlin in 1948–1949 to deter Soviet aggression as a successful example.

A 2022 study by Brian Blankenship and Erik Lin-Greenberg found that high-resolve, low-capability signals (such as tripwires) were not viewed as more reassuring to allies than low-resolve, high-capability alternatives (such as forces stationed offshore). Their study cast doubt on the reassuring value of tripwires.

== Nuclear deterrence theory ==
In 1966, Schelling is prescriptive in outlining the impact of the development of nuclear weapons in the analysis of military power and deterrence. In his analysis, before the widespread use of assured second strike capability, or immediate reprisal, in the form of SSBN submarines, Schelling argues that nuclear weapons give nations the potential to destroy their enemies but also the rest of humanity without drawing immediate reprisal because of the lack of a conceivable defense system and the speed with which nuclear weapons can be deployed. A nation's credible threat of such severe damage empowers their deterrence policies and fuels political coercion and military deadlock, which can produce proxy warfare.

According to Kenneth Waltz, there are three requirements for successful nuclear deterrence:

1. Part of a state's nuclear arsenal must appear to be able to survive an attack by the adversary and be used for a retaliatory second strike
2. The state must not respond to false alarms of a strike by the adversary
3. The state must maintain command and control

The stability–instability paradox is a key concept in rational deterrence theory. It states that when two countries each have nuclear weapons, the probability of a direct war between them greatly decreases, but the probability of minor or indirect conflicts between them increases. This occurs because rational actors want to avoid nuclear wars, and thus they neither start major conflicts nor allow minor conflicts to escalate into major conflicts—thus making it safe to engage in minor conflicts. For instance, during the Cold War the United States and the Soviet Union never engaged each other in warfare, but fought proxy wars in Korea, Vietnam, Angola, the Middle East, Nicaragua and Afghanistan and spent substantial amounts of money and manpower on gaining relative influence over the third world.

Bernard Brodie wrote in 1959 that a credible nuclear deterrent must be always ready. (Note: Definition of deterrence from the Dictionary of Modern Strategy and Tactics by Michael Keane: "The prevention or inhibition of action brought about by fear of the consequences. Deterrence is a state of mind brought about by the existence of a credible threat of unacceptable counteraction. It assumes and requires rational decision makers.") An extended nuclear deterrence guarantee is also called a nuclear umbrella.

Scholars have debated whether having a superior nuclear arsenal provides a deterrent against other nuclear-armed states with smaller arsenals. Matthew Kroenig has argued that states with nuclear superiority are more likely to win nuclear crises, whereas Todd Sechser, Matthew Fuhrmann and David C. Logan have challenged this assertion. A 2023 study found that a state with nuclear weapons is less likely to be targeted by non-nuclear states, but that a state with nuclear weapons is not less likely to target other nuclear states in low-level conflict. A 2022 study by Kyungwon Suh suggests that nuclear superiority may not reduce the likelihood that nuclear opponents will initiate nuclear crises.

Proponents of nuclear deterrence theory argue that newly nuclear-armed states may pose a short- or medium-term risk, but that "nuclear learning" occurs over time as states learn to live with new nuclear-armed states. Mark S. Bell and Nicholas L. Miller have however argued that there is a weak theoretical and empirical basis for notions of "nuclear learning."

=== Stages of US policy of deterrence ===
The US policy of deterrence during the Cold War underwent significant variations.

==== Containment ====
The early stages of the Cold War were generally characterized by the containment of communism, an aggressive stance on behalf of the US especially on developing nations under its sphere of influence. The period was characterized by numerous proxy wars throughout most of the globe, particularly Africa, Asia, Central America, and South America. One notable conflict was the Korean War. George F. Kennan, who is taken to be the founder of this policy in his Long Telegram, asserted that he never advocated military intervention, merely economic support, and that his ideas were misinterpreted as espoused by the general public.

==== Détente ====
With the US drawdown from Vietnam, the normalization of US relations with China, and the Sino-Soviet Split, the policy of containment was abandoned and a new policy of détente was established, with peaceful co-existence sought between the United States and the Soviet Union. Although all of those factors contributed to this shift, the most important factor was probably the rough parity achieved in stockpiling nuclear weapons with the clear capability of mutual assured destruction (MAD). Therefore, the period of détente was characterized by a general reduction in the tension between the Soviet Union and the United States and a thawing of the Cold War, which lasted from the late 1960s until the start of the 1980s. The doctrine of mutual nuclear deterrence then characterized relations between the United States and the Soviet Union and relations with Russia until the onset of the New Cold War in the early 2010s. Since then, relations have been less clear.

==== Reagan era ====
A third shift occurred with US President Ronald Reagan's arms build-up during the 1980s. Reagan attempted to justify the policy by concerns of growing Soviet influence in Latin America and the post-1979 revolutionary government of Iran. Similar to the old policy of containment, the US funded several proxy wars, including support for Saddam Hussein of Iraq during the Iran–Iraq War, support for the mujahideen in Afghanistan, who were fighting for independence from the Soviet Union, and several anticommunist movements in Latin America such as the overthrow of the Sandinista government in Nicaragua. The funding of the Contras in Nicaragua led to the Iran-Contra Affair, while overt support led to a ruling from the International Court of Justice against the United States in Nicaragua v. United States.

The final expression of the full impact of deterrence during the cold war can be seen in the agreement between Reagan and Mikhail Gorbachev in 1985. They "agreed that a nuclear war cannot be won and must never be fought. Recognizing that any conflict between the USSR and the U.S. could have catastrophic consequences, they emphasized the importance of preventing any war between them, whether nuclear or conventional. They will not seek to achieve military superiority."

While the army was dealing with the breakup of the Soviet Union and the spread of nuclear technology to other nations beyond the United States and Russia, the concept of deterrence took on a broader multinational dimension. The US policy on deterrence after the Cold War was outlined in 1995 in the document called "Essentials of Post–Cold War Deterrence". It explains that while relations with Russia continue to follow the traditional characteristics of MAD, but the US policy of deterrence towards nations with minor nuclear capabilities should ensure by threats of immense retaliation (or even pre-emptive action) not to threaten the United States, its interests, or allies. The document explains that such threats must also be used to ensure that nations without nuclear technology refrain from developing nuclear weapons and that a universal ban precludes any nation from maintaining chemical or biological weapons. The current tensions with Iran and North Korea over their nuclear programs are caused partly by the continuation of the policy of deterrence.

=== Post-Cold War period ===
In January 2022, the five recognized nuclear-weapon states joined for the first time in affirming the Reagan-Gorbachev formula "that a nuclear war cannot be won and must never be fought" and stating that nuclear weapons "should serve defensive purposes, deter aggression, and prevent war."

By the beginning of the 2022 Russian invasion of Ukraine, many western hawks expressed the view that deterrence worked in that war but only in one way – in favor of Russia. Former US security advisor, John Bolton, said: Deterrence is working in the Ukraine crisis, just not for the right side. The United States and its allies failed to deter Russia from invading. The purpose of deterrence strategy is to prevent the conflict entirely, and there Washington failed badly. On the other hand, Russian deterrence is enjoying spectacular success. Russia has convinced the West that even a whisper of NATO military action in Ukraine would bring disastrous consequences. Putin threatens, blusters, uses the word "nuclear," and the West wilts.

When Elon Musk prevented Ukraine from carrying drone attacks on the Russian Black Sea fleet by denying to enable needed Starlink communications in Crimea, Anne Applebaum argued Musk had been deterred by Russia after the country's ambassador warned him an attack on Crimea would be met with a nuclear response. Later Ukrainian attacks on the same fleet using a different communications system also caused deterrence, this time to the Russian Navy.

Timo S. Koster who served at NATO as Director of Defence Policy & Capabilities similarly argued: A massacre is taking place in Europe and the strongest military alliance in the world is staying out of it. We are deterred and Russia is not. Philip Breedlove, a retired four-star U.S. Air Force general and a former SACEUR, said that Western fears about nuclear weapons and World War III have left it "fully deterred" and Putin "completely undeterred." The West have "ceded the initiative to the enemy." No attempt was made by NATO to deter Moscow with the threat of military force, wondered another expert. To the contrary, it was Russia's deterrence that proved to be successful.

== Cyber deterrence ==
Since the early 2000s, there has been an increased focus on cyber deterrence. Cyber deterrence has two meanings:

1. The use of cyber actions to deter other states
2. The deterrence of an adversary's cyber operations

Scholars have debated how cyber capabilities alter traditional understandings of deterrence, given that it may be harder to attribute responsibility for cyber attacks, the barriers to entry may be lower, the risks and costs may be lower for actors who conduct cyber attacks, it may be harder to signal and interpret intentions, the advantage of offense over defense, and weak actors and non-state actors can develop considerable cyber capabilities. Scholars have also debated the feasibility of launching highly damaging cyber attacks and engaging in destructive cyber warfare, with most scholars expressing skepticism that cyber capabilities have enhanced the ability of states to launch highly destructive attacks. The most prominent cyber attack to date is the Stuxnet attack on Iran's nuclear program. By 2019, the only publicly acknowledged case of a cyber attack causing a power outage was the 2015 Ukraine power grid hack.

There are various ways to engage in cyber deterrence:

- Denial: preventing adversaries from achieving military objectives by defending against them
- Punishment: the imposition of costs on the adversary
- Norms: the establishment and maintenance of norms that establish appropriate standards of behavior
- Escalation: raising the probability that costs will be imposed on the adversary
- Entanglement and interdependence: interdependence between actors can have a deterrent effect

There is a risk of unintended escalation in cyberspace due to difficulties in discerning the intent of attackers, and complexities in state-hacker relationships. According to political scientists Joseph Brown and Tanisha Fazal, states frequently neither confirm nor deny responsibility for cyber operations so that they can avoid the escalatory risks (that come with public credit) while also signaling that they have cyber capabilities and resolve (which can be achieved if intelligence agencies and governments believe they were responsible).

According to Lennart Maschmeyer, cyber weapons have limited coercive effectiveness due to a trilemma "whereby speed, intensity, and control are negatively correlated. These constraints pose a trilemma for actors because a gain in one variable tends to produce losses across the other two variables."

== Intrawar deterrence ==
Intrawar deterrence is deterrence within a war context. It means that war has broken out but actors still seek to deter certain forms of behavior. In the words of Caitlin Talmadge, "intra-war deterrence failures... can be thought of as causing wars to get worse in some way." Examples of intrawar deterrence include deterring adversaries from resorting to nuclear, chemical and biological weapons attacks or attacking civilian populations indiscriminately. Broadly, it involves any prevention of escalation.

== Latent nuclear deterrence ==
Matthew Fuhrmann refers to the ability of some states to rapidly develop or gain nuclear weapons as "latent nuclear deterrence". These states do not necessarily aim to go all the way in building nuclear weapons, but they may develop the civilian nuclear technology that would rapidly enable them to build a nuclear weapon. They can use this nuclear latency status for coercive purposes, as they can deter adversaries who do not wish to see the state develop nuclear weapons or potentially use those nuclear weapons.

== Criticism ==
=== Deterrence failures ===
Deterrence theory has been criticized by numerous scholars for various reasons, the most basic being skepticism that decision makers are rational. A prominent strain of criticism argues that rational deterrence theory is contradicted by frequent deterrence failures, which may be attributed to misperceptions. Here it's argued that misestimations of perceived costs and benefits by analysts contribute to deterrence failures, as exemplified in case of Russian invasion of Ukraine. Frozen conflicts can be seen as rewarding aggression.

=== Misprediction of behavior ===
Scholars have also argued that leaders do not behave in ways that are consistent with the predictions of nuclear deterrence theory. Scholars have also argued that rational deterrence theory does not grapple sufficiently with emotions and psychological biases that make accidents, loss of self-control, and loss of control over others likely. Frank C. Zagare has argued that deterrence theory is logically inconsistent and empirically inaccurate. In place of classical deterrence, rational choice scholars have argued for perfect deterrence, which assumes that states may vary in their internal characteristics and especially in the credibility of their threats of retaliation.

=== Reliance on luck ===
Deterrence theory relies on the idea that nuclear war is to some degree controllable, especially during crises. Retrospective accounts of historical participants in nuclear crises have frequently emphasized, however, the role of "luck" in the avoidance of nuclear war. For example, Robert McNamara remarked in a retrospective analysis of the Cuban Missile Crisis that "it was luck that prevented nuclear war", and Dean Acheson attributed its peaceful resolution to "plain dumb luck." "Luck," in this context, signifies a lack of control: an acknowledgment that whether nuclear war happened or not was not something that was within the strict capabilities of the leaders of these countries to manage, and that the history of nuclear close-calls reveals that the lack of purposeful or accidental nuclear war can be at times variously attributed to disobedience, technical failures, the presence or lack of normal accidents, or other factors beyond strict human control; that "'lucky' nuclear close calls can be defined as instances in which unwanted nuclear explosions were avoided either 'independently' of control practices, 'despite' control practices, or 'because of the failure of' control practices." General George Lee Butler, commander of the US Strategic Air Command (1991–1992), argued in 1999 that "we escaped the Cold War without a nuclear holocaust by some combination of skill, luck, and divine intervention, and I suspect the latter in greatest proportion."

=== Suicide attacks ===
Advocates for nuclear disarmament, such as Global Zero, have criticized nuclear deterrence theory. Sam Nunn, William Perry, Henry Kissinger, and George Shultz have all called upon governments to embrace the vision of a world free of nuclear weapons, and created the Nuclear Security Project to advance that agenda. In 2010, the four were featured in a documentary film entitled Nuclear Tipping Point where proposed steps to achieve nuclear disarmament. Kissinger has argued, "The classical notion of deterrence was that there was some consequences before which aggressors and evildoers would recoil. In a world of suicide bombers, that calculation doesn't operate in any comparable way." Shultz said, "If you think of the people who are doing suicide attacks, and people like that get a nuclear weapon, they are almost by definition not deterrable."

=== Stronger deterrent ===
Paul Nitze argued in 1994 that nuclear weapons were obsolete in the "new world disorder" after the dissolution of the Soviet Union, and he advocated reliance on precision guided munitions to secure a permanent military advantage over future adversaries.

=== Minimum deterrence ===
As opposed to the extreme mutually assured destruction form of deterrence, the concept of minimum deterrence in which a state possesses no more nuclear weapons than is necessary to deter an adversary from attacking is presently the most common form of deterrence practiced by nuclear weapon states, such as China, India, Pakistan, Britain, and France. Pursuing minimal deterrence during arms negotiations between the United States and Russia allows each state to make nuclear stockpile reductions without the state becoming vulnerable, but it has been noted that there comes a point that further reductions may be undesirable, once minimal deterrence is reached, as further reductions beyond that point increase a state's vulnerability and provide an incentive for an adversary to expand its nuclear arsenal secretly.

France has developed and maintained its own nuclear deterrent under the belief that the United States will refuse to risk its own cities by assisting Western Europe in a nuclear war.

== See also ==
- Balance of terror – Cold War policy of tenuous peace
- Chainstore paradox – Game theory paradox
- Confidence-building measures – Actions taken to reduce fear of conflict
- Decapitation strike – Military strategy
- Democratic peace theory – International relations theory
- International relations – Study of relationships between states
- Launch on warning – Nuclear strategy
- Long Peace – Absence of major wars following World War II
- Madman theory – Feature of U.S. president Richard Nixon's foreign policy
- N-deterrence – Military doctrine of Pakistan
- Nuclear blackmail – Military strategy
- Nuclear ethics – Academic and policy-relevant field on problems in the nuclear weapons and energy complex
- Nuclear peace – Peace due to nuclear deterrence
- Nuclear strategy – Doctrines and plans for production and use of atomic weapons
- Nuclear terrorism – Terrorism involving nuclear material or weapons
- Nuclear warfare – Military conflict that deploys nuclear weaponry
- Peace through strength – Phrase that suggests that military power can help preserve peace
- Prisoner's dilemma – Standard example in game theory
- Reagan Doctrine – 1980s U.S. strategy to counter Soviet influence
- Security dilemma – Unwanted escalation of interstate tensions
- Tripwire force – Strategic approach in military deterrence theory
- Wargaming – Strategy game that realistically simulates war
