= Virginia Page Fortna =

American political scientist

Academic background
- Education: Wesleyan University (BA); Harvard University (PhD)

Academic work
- Discipline: Political science
- Institutions: Columbia University

Virginia Page Fortna is an American political scientist, a specialist in the study of peace negotiations. She is currently the Harold Brown Professor of U.S. Foreign and Security Policy at Columbia University. She is the recipient of the 2010 Karl Deutsch Award from the International Studies Association.

== Biography ==
Fortna received her B.A. from Wesleyan University in 1990 and her Ph.D. from Harvard University in 1998. Her research has focused on terrorism, the durability of peace, and conflict termination. Her research on peacekeeping has shown that interventions involving peacekeeping is capable of reinforcing peace agreements and reducing the likelihood of wars being re-ignited. Her research on terrorism reveals that terrorism usually fails, as non-terrorist movements are far more likely to win a settlement or a victory during civil conflicts, while groups that resort to systematic and indiscriminate violence are less likely to win or hold territory.

In 2010, the International Studies Association awarded Fortna the Karl Deutsch Award. She chaired the Columbia University political science department from 2013 to 2016, and she currently serves as the director of the Salzman Institute for War and Peace Studies. She was elected to the American Academy of Arts and Sciences in 2021.
