= Entente (alliance) =

Type of treaty or military alliance

An entente (/ɑːnˈtɑːnt/) is a type of treaty or military alliance in which the signatories promise to consult each other or to cooperate in the event of a crisis or military action. Examples include the Entente Cordiale between France and the United Kingdom and the Triple Entente between France, Russia and the United Kingdom.

It has been found that during wars, signatories of ententes are less likely to assist each other than signatories of defense pacts but more likely than signatories of non-aggression pacts. It has also been found that great powers are less likely to start wars against their partners in ententes than against their partners in nonaggression and defensive pacts or states with no alliance with them.
