= Coercion (international relations) =

Action by a state to compel international entities to do (or not) something

In international relations, coercion refers to the imposition of costs by a state on other states and non-state actors to prevent them from taking an action (deterrence) or to compel them to take an action (compellence). Coercion frequently takes the form of threats or the use of limited military force. It is commonly seen as analytically distinct from persuasion (which may not necessarily involve the imposition of costs), brute force (which may not be intended to shape the adversary's behavior), or full-on war (which involves the use of full military force).

Coercion takes the form of either deterrence or compellence. Compellence has been characterized as harder to successfully implement than deterrence because of difficulties in getting actors to withdraw actions. One influential typology of coercion distinguishes between strategies to punish an adversary, raise the risk for an adversary, or deny the adversary from achieving their objectives. Successful instances of coercive diplomacy in one case may have a deterrent effect on other states, whereas a reputation for a lack of resolve may undermine general deterrence and future compellence.

Successful coercive diplomacy entails clearly communicated threats, a cost-benefit calculus, credibility, and reassurance. It frequently revolves around a demonstration of capabilities and resolve, both of which enhance the credibility of attempts to coerce others. Scholars have identified several factors as contributing to successful coercion, such as power, interests, reputation, credibility, resolve, and ability to signal.

== Definition ==
Daniel Byman and Matthew Waxman define coercion as "getting the adversary to act a certain way via anything short of brute force; the adversary must still have the capacity of organized violence but choose not to exercise it". Coercion strategy "relies on the threat of future military force to influence an adversary's decision making but may also include limited uses of actual force".

Robert Pape uses the term coercion as a synonym for compellence.

== Coercion ==
Thomas Schelling and Robert Pape distinguished between coercive strategies that sought to:

1. Punish: Raise the costs for the adversary
2. Risk: Raise the probability of future costs for the adversary
3. Deny: Prevent the adversary from obtaining their objectives.

Pape also added the strategy of decapitation, which typically entails targeting leaders. Alexander Downes and Kathryn McNabb Cochran distinguish between two punishment strategies: (i) Coercive victimization (which raises the costs of war for a government by targeting its civilians) and (ii) Eliminationist victimization (which removes civilians from territory).

According to Richard Ned Lebow, successful coercion tends to involve:

1. A formulated commitment
2. A communication of that commitment to the other side
3. The capability to back up the commitment
4. The will to back up the commitment

According to Robert Art, the perquisites for coercion success are:

1. Clear objectives
2. Strong motivation
3. Domestic and international support
4. Strong leadership
5. Clearly stated demands
6. Creation of a sense of urgency in the other state's mind
7. Making the target fear unacceptable escalation
8. Asymmetry in motivation

=== Deterrence ===
Deterrence is widely defined as any use of threats (implicit or explicit) or limited force intended to dissuade an actor from taking an action (i.e. maintain the status quo).

Most of the innovative work on deterrence theory occurred from the late 1940s to mid-1960s. Historically, scholarship on deterrence has tended to focus on nuclear deterrence. Since the end of the Cold War, there has been an extension of deterrence scholarship to areas that are not specifically about nuclear weapons.

=== Compellence ===
Compellence is the attempt to get an actor to change its behavior through threats to use of force or the actual use of limited force. As distinguished from deterrence theory, which is a strategy aimed at maintaining the status quo (dissuading adversaries from undertaking an action), compellence entails efforts to change the status quo (persuading an opponent to change their behavior).

=== Credibility ===
Credibility in international relations refers to the perceived likelihood that a leader or a state follows through on threats and promises that have been made. Credibility is a key component of coercive diplomacy and deterrence, as well as the functioning of military alliances. Credibility is related to concepts such as reputation (how past behavior shapes perceptions of an actor's tendencies) and resolve (the willingness to stand firm while incurring costs).

Credibility may be determined through assessments of past reputation, current interests, and signaling. Misperception and miscommunication can lead to erroneous assessments of credibility. Assessments of reputation may be linked to specific leaders, as well as states. Some scholars question whether credibility or reputation matters in international disputes.

Credibility entails that defiance will be met with punishment, and that compliance will be met with restraint. One of the main problems in coercive diplomacy is that it is hard to credibly signal that compliance will not lead to punishment. If the coerced state perceives that it will be punished regardless of whether it complies or not, then that might increase the likelihood of non-compliance.

Some scholarship suggests that the credibility of threats is enhanced by costly signaling, which means that the threats themselves incur costs, which signify that the threats are genuine. Other scholars argue that sunk-cost signaling is exceedingly rare in practice, as states prefer to signal credibility and resolve in other ways.

Some scholars argue that incurring audience costs effectively enhance the credibility of threats. Other scholars dispute that audience costs enhance credibility.
