= Richardson Institute =

UK research institute

- Formation: 1959
- Type: Research institute
- Purpose: Researching and educating on the theme of peace studies
- Headquarters: Lancaster University, Bailrigg, Lancaster, LA1 4YL, United Kingdom
- Director: Simon Mabon
- Parent organization: Department of Politics, Philosophy, and Religion
- Website: www.lancaster.ac.uk/fass/centres/richinst

The Richardson Institute for Peace Studies was the first peace and conflict research centre in the UK and one of the first in the world. It is part of the Department of Politics, Philosophy, and Religion at Lancaster University, where its members publish research, hold lectures and workshops, and run academic outreach programmes.

== History ==
The Richardson Institute began as an independent organisation, the Lancaster Peace Research Centre, in the North of England in 1959. The centre was incorporated first into the Politics Department at Lancaster University, and then in 1969 into a branch of the Conflict Research Society at the University of Kent. There the centre was renamed the Richardson Institute for Conflict and Peace Research in honour of the polymath and pacifist Lewis Fry Richardson, and was moved to 158 North Gower St, London, which it shared with the Women’s Research and Resources Centre. During this time the Institute not only published academic papers, but also released an animated film about the nature of human communication in the United States.

On 1 October 1978, with funding from the Joseph Rowntree Foundation, the institute returned to Lancaster University as an autonomous body of the Politics Department. There its activities diversified into undergraduate and postgraduate teaching, ultimately leading to the creation of a studentship in 2006. Its early minor course in conflict & peace research proved particularly popular, and the institute became renowned for lecturing in "unashamedly behavioural" models of social science. In 1990 the members of the institute consolidated their work by publishing A Reader in Peace Studies, a basic text that became set reading for many introductory peace studies courses. As a result of this new activity, the institute was given the more general trade name of the Richardson Institute for Peace Studies.

As the institute shared more of the Politics Department’s day-to-day teaching responsibilities, its other activities declined. With funding from the Arts and Humanities Research Council, the institute was re-launched in September 2012. In 2013 it began the Richardson Institute Internship Programme, a year-long, multidisciplinary research placement with such partners as the Institute for Strategic Dialogue and the Ministry of Defence, and in 2016 it opened a course in the political theology of peace as the first in a number of distance learning modules on positive politics. The institute also hosts an annual peace lecture series and runs a film club. Its present aim is to become an international partner of choice for universities and to improve the public understanding of peace. Since 2012 the institute has published on such diverse topics as Indo-Pak relations, sexuality in the Anglican Church, and maritime cyber operations, and the ESRC has rated its research as outstanding.

== See also ==
- Peace and conflict studies
