= Audience cost =

An audience cost, in international relations theory, is the domestic political cost that leaders incur from their constituency if they escalate a foreign policy crisis and are then seen as backing down. It is considered to be one of the potential mechanisms for democratic peace theory. It is associated with rational choice scholarship in international relations.

The implication of audience costs is that threats issued by leaders, who incur audience costs, against other states are more likely to be seen as credible and thus lead those states to meet the demands of the leader who makes threats.

== Democratic peace theory ==
The term was popularized in a 1994 academic article by James Fearon in which he argued that democracies carry greater audience costs than authoritarian states, which makes them better at signaling their intentions in interstate disputes. It is one of the mechanisms for democratic peace theory.

Fearon's argument regarding the credibility of democratic states in disputes has been subject to debate among international relations scholars. Two studies 2001, using the MID and ICB datasets, provided empirical support for the notion that democracies were more likely to issue effective threats. Survey experiment data substantiate that specified threats induce audience costs, but other data have mixed findings and nuanced findings. A 2019 study found that audiences across the partisan divide had punished Trump, Obama, and "The President" for backing down after issuing threats, but it also found that presidents could reduce the audience costs by justifying the backing down as being in the national interest of the United States. Erik Gartzke and Yonatan Lupu argue that the nature of audience costs (they are a mechanism, not an effect) makes them hard to detect empirically. Kenneth Schultz has also remarked on the methodological difficulties in empirically assessing audience costs. A major problem in assessing audience costs is the fact that leaders typically make threats that are ambiguous in terms of time, place, specific action that trigger the threat, and nature of response. A smoking gun case for audience costs would be a case of the public opposing military action but subsequently punishing a leader for not going through with a threat to engage in military action.

Branislav Slantchev, Matthew Baum and Philip Potter have argued that the presence of the free media is a key component of audience costs. According to Matthew S. Levendusky, and Michael C. Horowitz, leaders can provide justifications to their audiences for why they backed down from a threat, thus reducing the audience costs.

Roseanne McManus finds support for the existence of audience costs but argues that the credibility of a threat necessarily also relies on the threatener's military strength, hawkishness of domestic veto players, and leaders' security in office.

=== Criticisms ===
However, a 2012 study by Alexander B. Downes and Todd S. Sechser found that existing datasets were not suitable to draw any conclusions as to whether democratic states issued more effective threats. They constructed their own dataset specifically for interstate military threats and outcomes, which found no relationship between regime type and effective threats. A 2017 study that recoded flaws in the MID dataset ultimately concluded " that there are no regime-based differences in dispute reciprocation, and prior findings may be based largely on poorly coded data." Other scholars have disputed the democratic credibility argument and questioned its causal logic and empirical validity. Jack Snyder and Erica Borghard argue that there is no evidence of audience costs in any post-1945 crises, leaders rarely make unambiguous threats, publics care about policy substance (not leader consistency in rhetoric and action), and publics care about the country's honor (not whether the leader issued an explicit threat). They add that in cases of audience costs being observed, it is frequently when the public is hawkish and pushes leaders to adopt hardline stances and actions. It is unclear whether the domestic costs in those cases is because leaders fear getting caught bluffing, or they just do not want to defy a hawkish public.

A 2021 study found that Americans perceived democracies to be more likely to back down in crises, which contradicts the expectations of the audience costs literature. A 2011 study argued that domestic audiences in democratic states were less capable of punishing leaders for backing down because democratic leaders have larger "winning coalitions." A 2012 study by Marc Trachtenberg, which analyzed a dozen great power crises, found no evidence of the presence of audience costs in these crises.

A 2005 study, which used a formal bargaining model, found that in situations of both sides issuing public threats, a "prisoner's dilemma is created in which both sides make high public demands which cannot be satisfied, and both negotiators would be better off if they could commit to not making public demands."

According to a 2021 study by Jayme R. Schlesinger and Jack S. Levy, leaders may be unaware of audience costs. To the extent that audience costs work, that may be a learned practice, rather than a consistent and timeless feature of international politics.

Research by Jessica Weeks argued that some authoritarian regime types have similar audience costs as in democratic states. Research by Jessica Chen Weiss argued that the Chinese regime fomented or clamped down on nationalist (or anti-foreign) protests in China to signal resolve. Fomenting or permitting nationalist protests entail audience costs, as they make it harder for the Chinese regime to back down in a foreign policy crisis out of fear of the protestors turning against the regime.

== Secret negotiations ==
Some scholars have grappled with the relationship between secret negotiations and audience costs. Shuhei Kurizaki, Austin Carson, Keren Yarhi-Milo, and Levenotoglu and Tarar have argued that secret operations, threats, and agreements can reduce inadvertent escalation to war by insulating leaders from the domestic backlash that would have occurred if the diplomacy had been conducted in public. Austin Carson argues that covert operations allow states to pursue their foreign policy interests without risking escalation to war. By keeping the operation covert, states avoid pressure by domestic audiences to escalate the operation beyond their original intent and communicate to their adversary their intent to keep the operation limited. Keren Yarhi-Milo argues that secret agreements between adversaries can lead to lasting peace if their initiator faces domestic opposition to the terms of the agreement. The ability of the other state to publicly disclose the terms means that it is a form of costly signaling of intentions by the initiator.

== In other contexts ==
States may be more likely to honor alliance commitments because of audience costs.

According to a 2020 study by Joshua A. Schwartz and Christopher W. Blair, gender stereotypes about leaders lead to audience costs, as women leaders are punished more severely for backing down after issuing threats.

A 2006 study by Todd Allee and Paul Huth found that leaders try to avoid audience costs for voluntary-negotiated settlements by instead using rulings by an international court or arbitration body, which the leaders can blame for adverse outcomes.

A 2020 study by John Harden explored some links between narcissistic leaders and audience cost theory. Narcissistic leaders can, in some cases, exploit audience costs to force uncooperative branches of government into action by swinging public opinion.

== See also ==
- Command responsibility
- Cost of conflict
- Indiscriminate attack
- Restraint (military)
