= Military alliance =

Alliance between different states with the purpose to cooperate militarily

European military alliances prior to World War I Triple Entente Triple Alliance

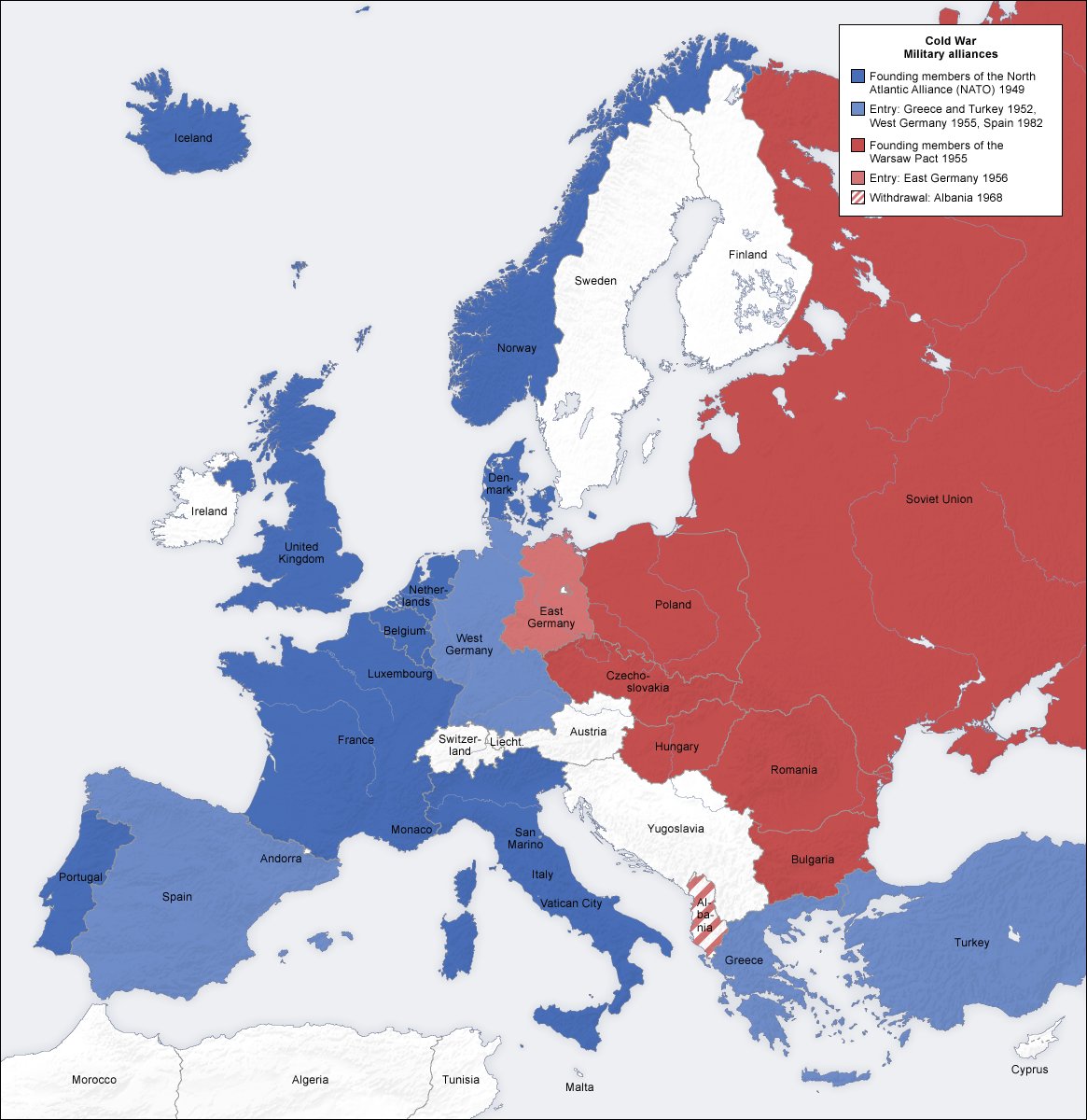
Two military alliances (The North Atlantic Treaty Organization and the Warsaw Pact) in Europe during the Cold War

A military alliance is a formal agreement between nations that specifies mutual obligations regarding national security. In the event a nation is attacked, members of the alliance are often obligated to come to their defense regardless if attacked directly. Military alliances can be classified into defense pacts, non-aggression pacts, and ententes. Alliances may be covert (as was common from 1870 to 1916) or public.

According to a 2002 dataset of military alliances, there have been 538 alliance treaties from 1815 to 2003. The vast majority of the alliances involve commitments to come to the military support of one ally involved in war. The vast majority are defensive in nature. Since the end of the Second World War, military alliances have usually behaved less aggressively and act more as a deterrent. A 2025 analysis of alliances across the 19th and 20th century found that alliances overall tend to deter war.

== Characteristics ==
Military alliances are related to collective security systems but can differ in nature. An early 1950s memorandum from the United States Department of State explained the difference by noting that historically, alliances "were designed to advance the respective nationalistic interests of the parties, and provided for joint military action if one of the parties in pursuit of such objectives became involved in war." A collective security arrangement "is directed against no one; it is directed solely against aggression. It seeks not to influence any shifting 'balance of power' but to strengthen the 'balance of principle'."

The obvious motivation in states engaging in military alliances is to protect themselves against threats from other countries. However, states have also entered into alliances to improve ties with a particular nation or to manage conflict with a particular nation.

The nature of alliances, including their formation and cohesiveness (or lack thereof), is a subject of much academic study past and present. Influential works include those by Glenn Snyder, Stephen Walt, and Kenneth Waltz. Kenneth Waltz outlined in his 1979 book Theory of International Politics a neorealist theory of international politics where he argued that balances of power tend to form in world politics.

During peace-time, according to a 2019 study, almost all alliances from 1870 to 1916 may have been covert or implied. In other time periods, covert alliances have been rare. The study argues that from 1870 to 1916, the unusual amount of covert alliances was incentivized by other covert alliances. The creation of public alliances would signal to the covert ally that the public alliance was more valuable. According to Ronald Krebs, pre-WWII alliances were generally "relatively simple, short-lived affairs."

According to a network study by Jackson and Nei (2015), the history of interstate alliances since the early nineteenth century can be divided roughly into a thin and unstable pre-1950 era and a more than four-times denser and more stable network after 1950. That later period with a denser and more stable network of alliances coincides with a sharp decline in interstate wars and an increase in trading relationships. The same analysis reports that a larger number of allies correlates with being attacked less frequently, and that greater bilateral trade correlates with less conflict.

Common problems for alliances revolve around free-riding and burden-sharing. Members of an alliance have incentives not to contribute to the alliance while simultaneously benefiting on the public goods provided by the alliance. According to Mancur Olson and Richard Zeckhauser's classic study of alliances, small states frequently free-ride on the large state's contributions to an alliance. Small allies that are militarily vulnerable are less likely to free-ride, whereas strategically important small allies are most likely to free-ride. Alliances may also lead to moral hazard whereby allies behave more aggressively and recklessly if they believe that the alliance will aid them in any conflict. On the whole, alliances do deter aggression on net.

Military alliances can incentivize the kinds of military capabilities that member states develop. Rather than duplicate similar capabilities across allies, alliances can incentivize member states to specialize in certain capabilities that they have an advantage in and under-produce other capabilities that they have a disadvantage in producing. This can enhance the capabilities of the alliance as a whole.

Within alliances, actors may fear entrapment or abandonment. Entrapment (or entanglement) means that allies get dragged into a conflict over one ally's interests that the other allies do not share. Scholars have disputed the prevalence of entrapment, with Stephen Brooks and William Wohlforth writing "it is nearly impossible to find a clear case of entrapment actually occurring." Abandonment means that allies do not come to the rescue of a fellow ally. Strong commitments to an alliance can reduce the bargaining power of that ally vis-a-vis the other allies. However, an ally whose commitment to the alliance is in doubt has greater bargaining leverage. Weak alliance commitments can make it easier for the ally to realign the alliance if a fellow ally is considered unsatisfactory. Strong alliance commitments may strengthen the adversary's alliance, as the adversary may face a greater threat.

The failure of a strong ally to come to the rescue of a weaker ally (abandonment) may jeopardize the strong ally's other alliances. However, it may also strengthen the other alliances, as the other allies may sometimes prefer that the strong ally abandons a weak ally if it is likely to raise the risks of military escalation for the other allies.

Great powers may engage in coercive actions, in particular covert action, against allies when there are doubts about allies' future alignment.

== European historiography ==
In the European historical context, a military alliance can be viewed as a league between independent states, defined by treaty, for the purpose of combined action, defensive or offensive, or both. The oldest such alliance in the world today is the Anglo-Portuguese Alliance, dating back to 1373 where the then Kingdoms of England and Portugal pledged to "perpetual friendship" between the two countries. This remains in action today between the current United Kingdom and Portugal, and the two have never fought against each other in any military campaign. Alliances have often been directed to specific objects carefully defined in the treaties. Thus the Triple Alliance of 1668 between Great Britain, Sweden and the Netherlands, and the Grand Alliance of 1689 between the Holy Roman Empire, Holland, England, Spain and Saxony, were both directed against the power of Louis XIV of France. The Quadruple or Grand Alliance of 1814, defined in the Treaty of Chaumont, between Great Britain, Austria, Russia and Prussia, had for its object the overthrow of Napoleon and his dynasty, and the confining of France within her traditional boundaries. The Triple Alliance of 1882 between Germany, Austria and Italy was ostensibly directed to the preservation of European peace against any possible aggressive action of France or Russia; and this led in turn, some ten years later, to the Dual Alliance between Russia and France, for mutual support in case of any hostile action of the other powers.

Occasionally, however, attempts have been made to give alliances a more general character. Thus the Holy Alliance of 26 September 1815 was an attempt, inspired by the religious idealism of the Emperor Alexander I of Russia, to find in the "sacred precepts of the Gospel", a common basis for a general league of the European governments, its object being, primarily, the preservation of peace. So, too, by Article VI of the Quadruple Treaty signed at Paris on 20 November 1815 – which renewed that of Chaumont and was again renewed, in 1818, at Aix-la-Chapelle – the scope of the Grand Alliance was extended to objects of common interest not specifically stated in the treaties. The article runs: "In order to consolidate the intimate tie which unites the four sovereigns for the happiness of the world, the High Contracting Powers have agreed to renew at fixed intervals, either under their own auspices or by their respective ministers, meetings consecrated to great common objects and to the examination of such measures as at each one of these epochs shall be judged most salutary for the peace and prosperity of the nations and the maintenance of the tranquility of Europe".

It was this article of the treaty of the 20 November 1815, rather than the Holy Alliance, that formed the basis of the serious effort made by the great powers, between 1815 and 1822, to govern Europe in concert. In general it proved that an alliance, to be effective, must be clearly defined as to its objects, and that in the long run the treaty in which these objects are defined must – to quote Otto von Bismarck's somewhat cynical dictum – "be reinforced by the interests" of the parties concerned. Yet the "moral alliance" of Europe, as Count Karl Nesselrode called it, though it failed to secure the permanent harmony of the powers, was an effective instrument for peace during the years immediately following the downfall of Napoleon; and it set the precedent for those periodical meetings of the representatives of the powers, for the discussion and settlement of questions of international importance, which, though cumbrous and inefficient for constructive work, contributed much to the preservation of the general peace during much of the nineteenth century.

== See also ==
- List of military alliances
- Multinational force
- Coercion (international relations)
- Confederation
- List of confederations
