= Joshua D. Kertzer =

Canadian political scientist

Joshua David Kertzer is a Canadian political scientist who is the John Zwaanstra Professor of International Studies and Government at the Department of Government at Harvard University.

== Early life and education ==
Kertzer was born in Canada. He earned a B.A. in Political Studies from Queen's University and Master’s degrees in Political Science from the University of Toronto and The Ohio State University. Subsequently, he obtained a Ph.D. in Political Science from The Ohio State University.

== Career ==
After a postdoctoral fellowship at Dartmouth College, Kertzer became an assistant professor at Harvard University's Department of Government. He received tenure in 2020.

He serves on the editorial boards of the American Journal of Political Science, Global Studies Quarterly, and International Organization.

== Research ==
Kertzer is an expert in international security, foreign policy, political psychology, and quantitative and experimental methods. His first book, Resolve in International Politics, was published in 2016 by Princeton University Press.

== Awards ==
- Alexander L. George Award, International Society of Political Psychology (ISPP)
- Merze Tate Award, American Political Science Association (APSA)
- Kenneth N. Waltz Dissertation Prize, American Political Science Association (APSA)
- Walter Isard Award, Peace Science Society (PSS)
- Jim Sidanius Early Career Award, International Society of Political Psychology (ISPP)
- Karl Deutsch Award, International Studies Association (ISA)
