= Tanisha Fazal =

American political scientist

Tanisha Fazal is an American political scientist. She is Professor of Political Science at the University of Minnesota, Minneapolis, where she joined the faculty in 2017. She was previously a professor at the University of Notre Dame and Columbia University. She is the author of the books State Death: The Politics and Geography of Conquest, Occupation, and Annexation and Wars of Law: Unintended Consequences in the Regulation of Armed Conflict. Some of her notable research findings include that violent state death has been exceedingly rare since the end of World War II, states rarely declare war, and that improvements in battlefield medicine have led to dramatic reductions in battlefield deaths. She was awarded a prestigious Andrew Carnegie Fellowship for 2021-2023.

In 2001, she was awarded her PhD in Political Science from Stanford University. Her dissertation advisors included Scott Sagan and Stephen Krasner. She has an undergraduate degree from Harvard University. She was influenced by Louise Richardson. She was a Postdoc at the John M. Olin Institute for Strategic Studies, Cambridge, MA.
