= Fred Chernoff =

Fred Chernoff is an American academic and scholar of international relations, security studies, and the philosophy of social science. He is the Harvey Picker Professor of International Relations in the Department of Political Science at Colgate University in Hamilton, New York. Chernoff is known for his contributions to international relations theory, metatheory, and the study of scientific progress in the social sciences.

== Early life and education ==
Fred Chernoff was born in Los Angeles, California and attended Hollywood High School. He earned his A.B. (Bachelor of Arts) in philosophy from Rutgers University – Camden, followed by advanced degrees from Yale University and The Johns Hopkins University. Chernoff holds two doctoral degrees: a Ph.D. in philosophy from Johns Hopkins and a Ph.D. in political science from Yale University.

== Academic Career ==
Chernoff joined the faculty at Colgate University, where he has served as Harvey Picker Professor of International Relations and a senior member of the Political Science Department. He has also chaired the political science department and directed the International Relations program.

Chernoff has held visiting faculty positions at Yale University, Brown University, and Wesleyan University. He has also held research posts at the International Institute for Strategic Studies in London, the Norwegian Institute of International Affairs in Oslo, and the Rand Corporation in the United States.

== Research ==
Chernoff’s early research focused on alliance politics and post–Cold War security dynamics, particularly the evolution of transatlantic cooperation and the transformation of NATO following the collapse of bipolar rivalry. In After Bipolarity: Theories of Cooperation, the Vanishing Threat, and the Future of the Atlantic Alliance, he analyzed competing theoretical explanations for continued cooperation among Western allies after the disappearance of the Soviet threat, contributing to debates on institutional persistence and strategic adaptation.

In The Power of International Theory: Re‑forging the Link to Policy‑making Through Scientific Enquiry, he argued that rigorous scientific inquiry can strengthen the practical relevance of international relations scholarship. He examined how different theoretical traditions, such as realism, liberalism, and constructivism, generate distinct forms of explanation and policy guidance.

His work in Theory and Metatheory in International Relations: Concepts and Contending Accounts further developed this line of inquiry by analyzing competing philosophical assumptions underlying international relations theories.

== Selected publications ==
=== Books ===
- Chernoff, Fred. After Bipolarity: Theories of Cooperation, the Vanishing Threat, and the Future of the Atlantic Alliance (1995).
- The Power of International Theory (2005).
- Theory and Metatheory in International Relations (2007).
- Explanation and Progress in Security Studies (2014).

=== Journal Articles and Chapters ===
- Chernoff, Fred. “International Relations, Social Theory, and Scientific Reductionism .” International Studies Review (2026).
- Chernoff, Fred. “Scientific Realism as a Meta‑Theory of International Politics.” International Studies Quarterly (2002).
- Chernoff, Fred. “‘Truth,’ ‘Justice,’ and the American Wave Function: Comments on Alexander Wendt’s Quantum Mind.” International Theory (2022).
- Chernoff, Fred; Cornut, Jérémie; James, Patrick. “Analytic eclecticism and International Relations: Promises and pitfalls” (2020).
