= Michael C. Horowitz =

American international relations scholar

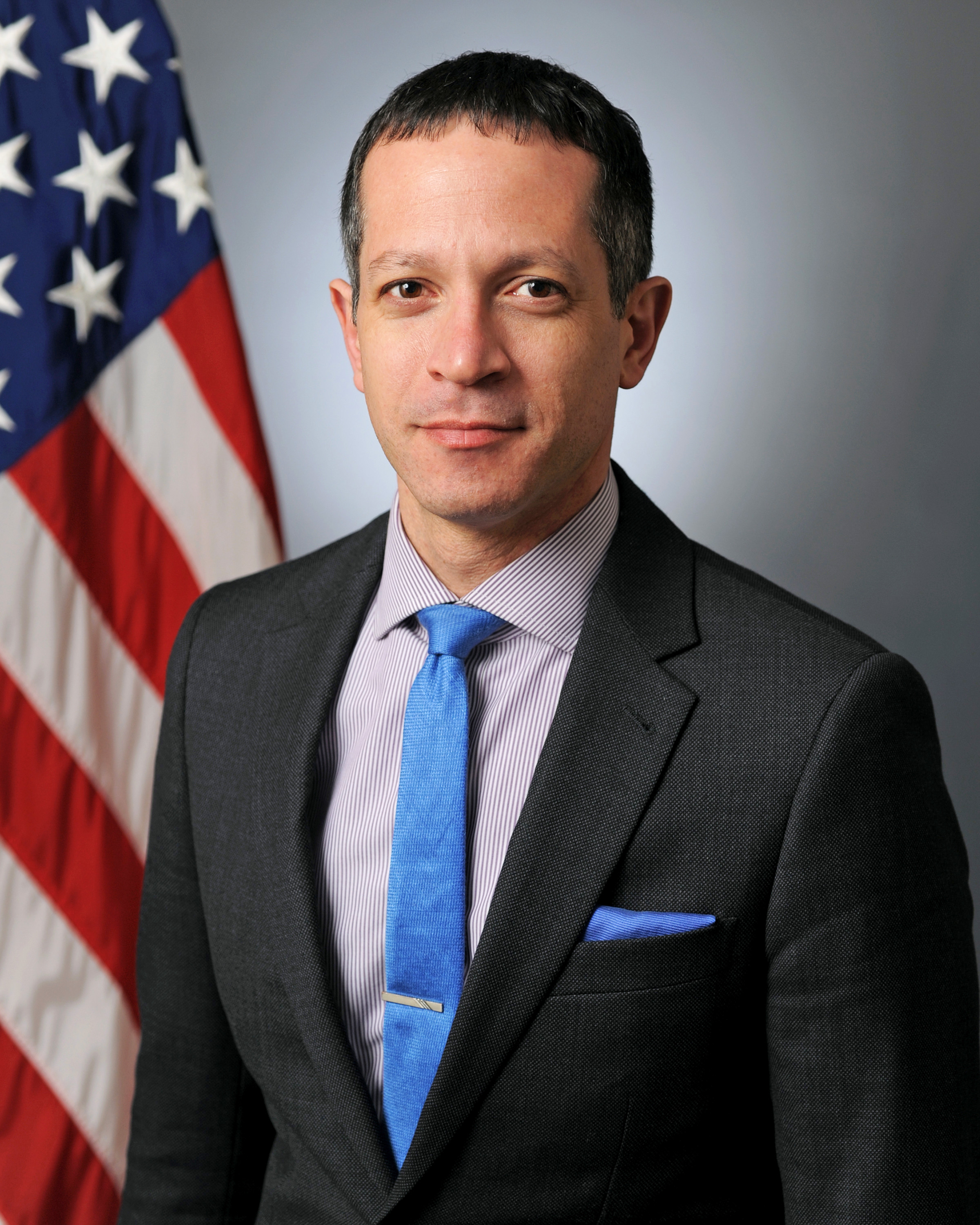

Deputy Assistant Secretary of Defense for Force Development and Emerging Capabilities
- In office July 2023 – August 2024
- President: Joe Biden

Personal details
- Education: Emory University (BA); Harvard University (PhD)

Michael C. Horowitz (born 1978) is an American international relations scholar who formerly served as U.S. Deputy Assistant Secretary of Defense for Force Development and Emerging Capabilities in the Office of the Under Secretary of Defense for Policy in the Biden administration. Prior to joining the Defense Department in April 2022, he was a professor of political science at the University of Pennsylvania.

== Early life and education ==
Horowitz grew up in Lexington, MA. He attended Emory University, where he was a member of a team that won the 2000 National Debate Tournament. He graduated from Emory in 2000 with a BA in political science, then earned a PhD in Government from Harvard University.

== Career ==
In addition to having a faculty position at the University of Pennsylvania, Horowitz is an investigator for the Good Judgment Project. In 2013 he served as an International Affairs Fellow, funded by the Council on Foreign Relations, in the Office of the Undersecretary of Defense for Policy. He is author of the book The Diffusion of Military Power: Causes and Consequences for International Politics, which "examines how the financial and organizational challenges of adopting new methods of fighting wars can influence the international balance of power." The book won the 2010 Edgar S. Furniss Book Award given by the Mershon Center for International Security Studies, as well as the 2011 Best Book Award from the International Security Studies section of the International Studies Association and the 2011 Harold D. Lasswell Prize, Society of Policy Scientists.

In 2017, Horowitz received the Karl Deutsch Award from the International Studies Association. This award is given annually to an individual under the age of 40 who is judged to have made the most significant contribution to the study of international relations and peace research.

On February 25, 2020, Horowitz was appointed director of Perry World House, the University of Pennsylvania's Think Tank for Global Affairs. He previously served as the think tank's Associate Director from 2015 to 2019.

Horowitz is a life member of the Council on Foreign Relations.

== Publications ==
=== Articles ===
- "Battles of Precise Mass", Foreign Affairs, October 22, 2024
- "A Force for the Future", Foreign Affairs, April 19, 2022 (co-authored with Lauren Kahn and Laura Resnick Samotin)
- "War by Timeframe: Responding to China's Pacing Challenge", War On the Rocks, November 19, 2021
- "The Perils of Overhyping Artificial Intelligence", Foreign Affairs, April 6, 2021 (co-authored with Julia Ciocca and Lauren Kahn)
- "China Has Made Drone Warfare Global", Foreign Affairs, November 20, 2020 (co-authored with Joshua A. Schwartz and Matthew Fuhrmann)
- "The Death and Life of Terrorist Networks", Foreign Affairs, October 5, 2020 (co-authored with Christopher Blair, Erica Chenoweth, Evan Perkoski, and Philip B. K. Potter)
