= Zeev Maoz =

Israeli-American political scientist

Ze'ev Maoz (born 28 June 1951) is a Professor of Political Science and Director of the Correlates of War Project at the University of California, Davis, as well as Distinguished Fellow at the Interdisciplinary Center, Herzliya, Israel. He is the President of the Peace Science Society (International) during 2007-08. Before coming to UC-Davis he was head of the Graduate School of Government and Policy at Tel-Aviv University. He also served as the Head of the Jaffee Center for Strategic Studies (1994–1997), as the Academic Director of the M.A. program of the National Defense College of the IDF (1990–1994), and as Chairman of the Department of Political Science at the University of Haifa (1991–1994) and is a former IDF Chief that served in three wars and in the Israeli occupation of Southern Lebanon. Maoz received his Ph.D. from the University of Michigan. He also held visiting appointments at Carnegie Mellon University, New York University, Rice University, and the University of Michigan.

== Books ==
- Zeev Maoz 2010. Networks of Nations: The Evolution, Structure, and Impact of International Networks, 1816-2001. New York: Cambridge University Press (448pp).
- Zeev Maoz 2006. Defending the Holy Land: A Critical Analysis of Israel’s National Security and Foreign Policy. Ann Arbor: University of Michigan Press (728pp).
- Zeev Maoz, Alex Mintz, T. Clifton Morgan, Glenn Palmer, and Richard J. Stoll (eds.) 2004. Multiple Paths to Knowledge in International Relations: Methodology in the Study of Conflict Management and Conflict Resolution. Lexington, MA: Lexington Books.
- Zeev Maoz, Emily Landau, and Tamar Maltz (Eds.). Regional Security Regimes. Special Issue of the Journal of Strategic Studies (November 2003).
- Zeev Maoz and Ben D. Mor 2002. Bound By Struggle: The Strategic Evolution of Enduring International Rivalries. Ann Arbor, MI: University of Michigan Press (356pp).
- Zeev Maoz and Azar Gat (eds). 2001. War in A Changing World. Ann Arbor, MI: University of Michigan Press (268pp).
- Zeev Maoz 1997 (ed). Regional Security in the Middle East: Past, Present, and Future. Special Issue of the Journal of Strategic Studies, Vol. 17, No. 1 (March). Published as a book by the same title. London: Frank Cass, 1997 (208 pp).
- Zeev Maoz 1996. Domestic Sources of Global Change. Ann Arbor, MI: University of Michigan Press (280 pp).
- Zeev Maoz 1990. National Choices and International Processes. Cambridge: Cambridge University Press, (609 pp).
- Zeev Maoz 1990. Paradoxes of War: On the Art of National Self-Entrapment. Boston, MA: Unwin Hymann, (365 pp).
- Zeev Maoz 1982. Paths to Conflict: Interstate Dispute Initiation, 1816-1976. Boulder, CO: Westview Press (276 pp).
