= Journal of Conflict Resolution =

- Discipline: Peace and conflict studies
- Language: English
- Edited by: Paul Huth

Publication details
- History: 1957–present
- Publisher: SAGE Publications
- Frequency: 8 times per year
- Impact factor: 3.1 (2022)

Standard abbreviations
- ISO 4: J. Confl. Resolut.

Indexing
- ISSN: 0022-0027 (print); 1552-8766 (web)
- LCCN: 59062807
- JSTOR: 00220027
- OCLC no.: 615542569

Links
- Journal homepage; Online access; Online archive

The Journal of Conflict Resolution is a bimonthly peer-reviewed academic journal covering research on international conflict and conflict resolution. It was established in 1957 and is published by SAGE Publications. The editor-in-chief is Paul Huth (University of Maryland, College Park).

== History ==
The journal was established in 1957. In 1959, the journal was run by the Center for Research on Conflict Resolution at the University of Michigan in Ann Arbor. When the Center closed in 1971 due to lack of funding, the journal was run by a team at Yale University. Since 2009, the journal has been run by a team at the University of Maryland. Bruce Russett was a long-time editor-in-chief of the journal prior to Paul Huth's appointment as editor-in-chief in 2009. The journal is published under the auspices of the Peace Science Society.

== Abstracting and indexing ==
The journal is abstracted and indexed in Scopus, RePEc, and the Social Sciences Citation Index. According to the Journal Citation Reports, the journal has a 2012 impact factor of 3.1, ranking it 45th out of 187 journals in the category "Political Science" and 19th out of 96 journals in the category "International Relations".
