= Dustin Tingley =

American political scientist

Dustin Tingley is an American political scientist who is the Thomas D. Cabot Professor of Public Policy at the Department of Government at Harvard University.

== Education ==
Tingley received a B.A. in Political Science and Mathematics from the University of Rochester and an M.A. and Ph.D. in Politics from Princeton University.

== Career ==
After an Assistant Professorship at the Department of Government at Harvard University, Tingley took up the posts of Paul Sack Associate Professor of Political Economy and Thomas D. Cabot Professor of Public Policy.

He serves on the editorial boards of the Annual Review of Political Science, the Harvard Data Science Review, and International Organization, among others.

== Research ==
Tingley specializes in international political economy, climate change, causal inference, data science, machine learning, and digital education.

His first book, Sailing the Water’s Edge: Domestic Politics and American Foreign Policy (co-authored with Helen V. Milner), was published in 2015 by Princeton University Press.

== Awards ==
- Don K. Price Award, Science, Technology, and Environmental Politics Section, American Political Science Association (APSA)
- Statistical Software Award, Society for Political Methodology
- Gladys M. Kammerer Award (with Helen Milner), American Political Science Association
