= Postcolonial international relations =

Critical theory approach to international relations

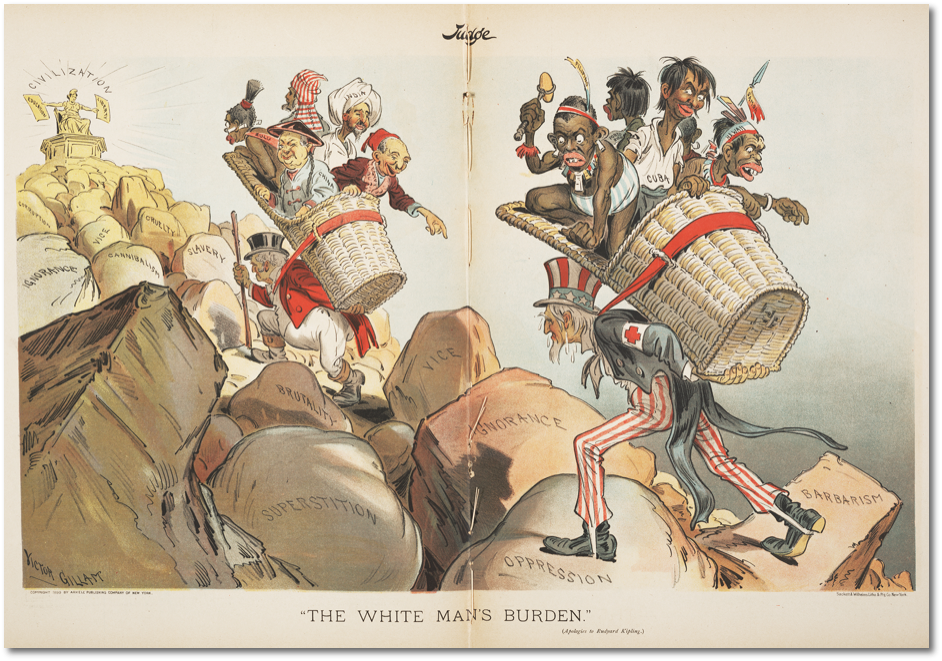
Political cartoon titled "The White Man's Burden" by Victor Gillam

Postcolonial international relations (postcolonial IR) is a branch of scholarship that approaches the study of international relations (IR) using the critical lens of postcolonialism. This critique of IR theory suggests that mainstream IR scholarship does not adequately address the impacts of colonialism and imperialism on current day world politics. Despite using the language of post-, scholars of postcolonial IR argue that the legacies of colonialism are ongoing, and that critiquing international relations with this lens allows scholars to contextualize global events. By bridging postcolonialism and international relations, scholars point to the process of globalization as a crucial point in both fields, due to the increases in global interactions and integration. Postcolonial IR focuses on the re-narrativization of global politics to create a balanced transnational understanding of colonial histories, and attempts to tie non-Western sources of thought into political praxis.

Postcolonial IR developed through the study of postcolonialism as a rejection of colonialism, and parallels postmodernism or poststructuralism in the skepticism towards and departure from the dominant ideologies of modernism and structuralism, respectively. Postcolonial IR is critically introspective into the study of International Relations, often in attempts to disturb dominant models of theorization to relocate IR temporally and spatially. Some scholars of postcolonial IR critique postcolonialism as well for taking too much of a cultural and civilizational approach, rather than connecting colonialism to political and economic structures of the modern world. Many scholars have attempted to bridge the studies of postcolonialism and international relations, and have often taken interdisciplinary approaches that consider various social aspects such as race, gender, and class. Additionally, scholars of postcolonial IR have also critically analyzed systems such as capitalism, patriarchy, and militarism as modes in which colonization has impacted political issues such as governance and sovereignty. Some prominent scholars that have informed the approach of postcolonialism include Edward Said, Frantz Fanon, and Gayatri Chakravorty Spivak, amongst many others.

Postcolonial IR's critique of mainstream IR studies of capitalism claims that the legacies of the exploitation of labour through colonization and imperialism are not acknowledged enough as current global economy. Aimé Césaire's essay Discourse on Colonialism rejects the claim that capitalism is simply the pursuit of wealth and power, and emphasizes the European colonial empire's desire to "civilize" pre-colonial societies. This concept is also highlighted by Rudyard Kipling in their conceptualization of "The White Man's Burden" to bring Western ideologies in order to enlighten morally "primitive" colonized peoples. Postcolonial IR therefore traces the modern global economy from exploitation in the forms of transatlantic slavery, such as through the British East India Company, Royal African Company, and the Dutch East India Company, as well as conquest and genocide of indigenous peoples, in order to create conditions suitable for European colonial expansion.

As such, the labeling of the "Third World" in the economic and political sense during the Cold War can be viewed from a postcolonial IR perspective to embody racialized and colonial meanings instead. Postcolonial scholars have pointed to the historicism inherent in much of traditional political thinking, particularly embedded in liberal justifications of colonial expansion, and critiqued the way Western canon has often framed development and modernity in fixed-trajectory, linear terms. Dipesh Chakrabarty, in Provicializing Europe (2000), argues that the experience of political modernity outside the West, with his focus on India, exposes problems in the supposedly universal European blueprint. There is thus a profound inadequacy in trying to place non-European societies on a developmental timeline derived from Europe's own history, exposing the Eurocentrism of development labels.

Some scholars of Postcolonial IR have further argued that the institution of development aid has only reinforced these inferiority narratives by creating systems in which Western countries, through agencies such as the IMF, benevolently bring modernization to "Third World" countries. Other scholars emphasize how even these supposed acts of charity are embedded in deeply predatory power structures, particularly that of debt. In contrast to liberal theory's "complex interdependence", Meera Sabaratnam and Mark Laffey have introduced "complex indebtedness" as a model for explaining the hierarchical and asymmetric relations between former imperial and postcolonial nations today.

== History ==
The study of postcolonial international relations has emerged only recently as a subfield in the discipline of international relations, but there have been previous postcolonial approaches to international relations that were not systematically recognized as such, or were excluded from dominant narratives.

For instance, a group of scholars at Howard University including Ralph Bunche, Alain Locke, and Merze Tate among others, considered race, empire, and decolonization in the context of global colonial dynamics. These scholars, active in the first half of the 20th century, challenged dominant theoretical assumptions about global racial hierarchies that informed the early mainstream developments of International Relations. They were focused on systemic factors that disadvantaged Black people globally, such as the Jim Crow laws in the United States and global colonial exploitation by Europeans. This school of thought developed parallel to and in response to early mainstream international relations in North America that evolved based on perceived threats to the white supremacist system through the increased spatial concentration of Black people, culture, and intellectualism. The work of these scholars can be considered postcolonial because they stressed global solidarity of liberation movements, questioned racial hierarchies that placed Black people at the bottom, and explored the relationship of race and empire in shaping global power dynamics. Influential in postcolonial IR theory, scholars like W. E. B. Du Bois and Alain Locke have considered the impact of national imperialism on modern war and international affairs. They have also formulated cultural theses about diasporas, cultural self-determination, and cosmopolitanism.

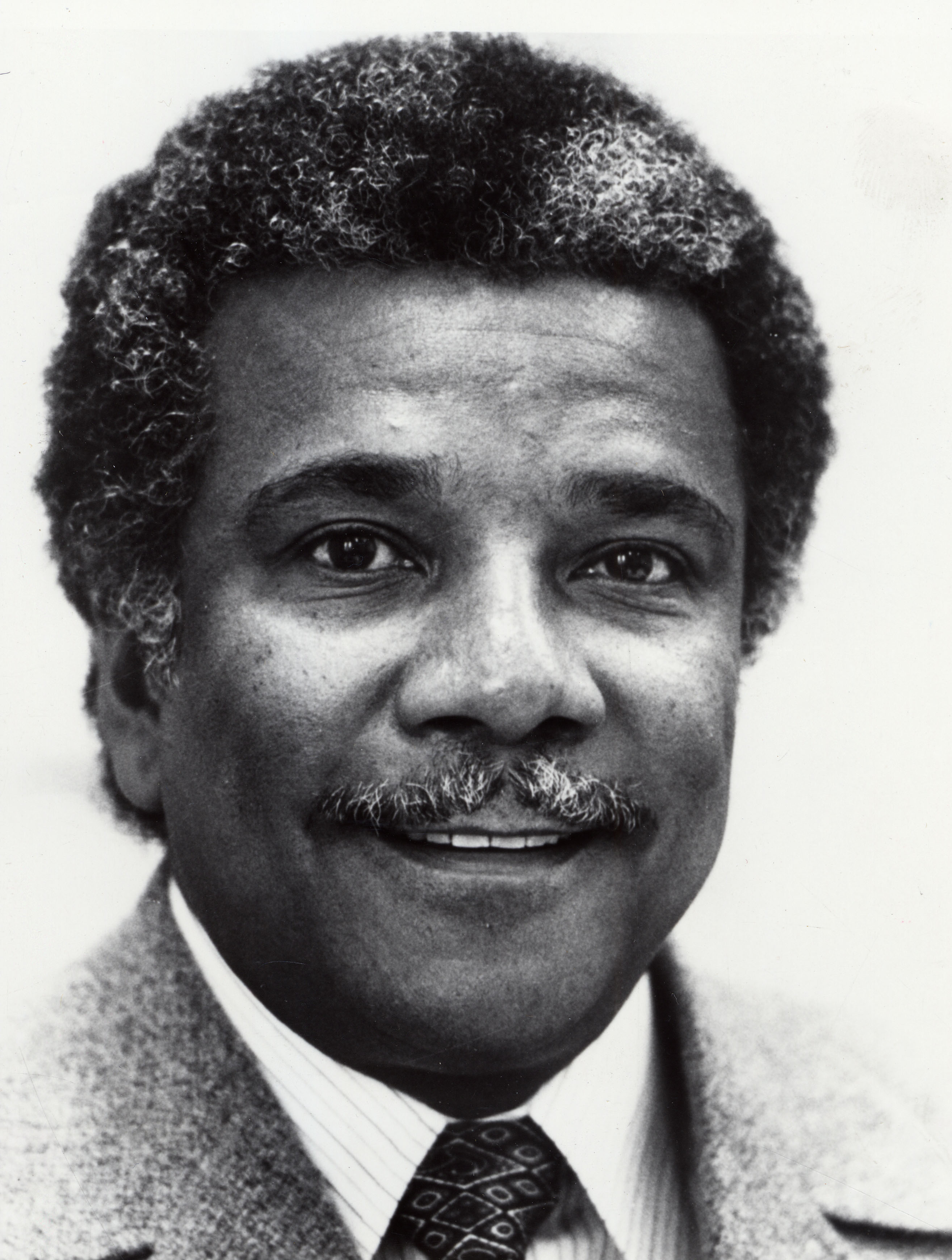
Ali A. Mazrui

It can be argued that the discipline of international relations has become less open over the years, becoming less receptive to cultural perspectives other than the dominant Western narrative. In 1968, postcolonial African scholar Ali Mazrui published an article on issues of the Global North and South relations in World Politics, one of the leading journals of international relations. In the 1960s and 1970s, the discipline was more engaged with the so-called "Third World", a stance that reflected a general political interest of the West in the decolonization movements of the former European colonies. Through scholars like Mazrui, whose origins and perspective situated them outside the western mainstream of the discipline, for a few years, scholars within mainstream international relations were influenced to ask questions about the "Third World" in a more postcolonial context. One example of this is Australian scholar Hedley Bull, who is said to have been influenced by Mazrui through a close professional adversarial relationship. Shortly after, however, international relations scholars turned away from this development. In the 1970s and 1980s, international relations became more westernized, dubbed the "American Social Science", and excluded postcolonial scholars like Mazrui that would challenge some of the foundational theories of international relations. This time period also gave rise to positivism in international relations, which centers empiricist observation and a more scientific approach, as many academic contributions to the discussion are overlooked when they are not explicitly labeled IR by their authors or other academics later on. Political scientist Mae C. King is among the Black female scholars who wrote on race and foreign and military policy in the 1980s and 1990s but have gotten little recognition within postcolonial IR. Notably, since the 1990s, there have been a number of scholars publishing on the relationship between International Relations and race, including Neta Crawford and Shirin M. Rai.

== Approach ==
Postcolonial IR is an evolving academic approach that has diverse methodologies, usually addressing the hierarchies and structures of power between (post-) colonial states and colonized regions, sometimes described as the North–South divide. Postcolonial studies are traditionally situated in the humanities, which has had two main consequences in the context of their connection to international relations. Firstly, they have been marginalized in the disciplines of political science and international relations due to their unscientific character. This has made the utilization of a postcolonial lens on International Relations more difficult, since there is barely any practical academic overlap between the two disciplines at universities. Secondly, postcolonial thought is frequently understood to not be political enough. This is a critique often echoed in relation to postmodernist thought, for example Edward Said's critique of Foucault for the lack of space for materialist thinking and active resistance in his works.

Postcolonial approaches in political science are also present in other subfields such as postpositivism and critical political theory that overlap with postcolonial IR. This proliferation of specialized subfields, combined with its own uncertainty about its identity and positionality, complicates engagement with postcolonial IR.

=== Confronting Eurocentrism ===
Much of initial postcolonial IR critiqued mainstream international relations as overlooking European imperialism as to create a Eurocentric narrative of global politics, with postcolonial scholars aiming to expand knowledge production to the contributions of non-Western perspectives. Eurocentrism is often also accompanied by the term "Orientalism", coined by Edward Said in their 1978 book, which describes the ways in which the "East" has been depicted by Western society as being underdeveloped and inferior. Postcolonial IR compares global colonial power dynamics to critique the subjectivity of the cultural and ideological "Other" of international relations, which is embodied by the portrayal of colonized countries and their people as subordinate to European nations. Spivak uses the concept of the subaltern to describe those that are excluded from cultural hegemonic discourse, and have very little or no agency to speak on their oppression. Said argues that taking a political stance of those experiencing ongoing victimization from colonial, capitalist, and patriarchal world order is essential to disrupt European hegemonic power.

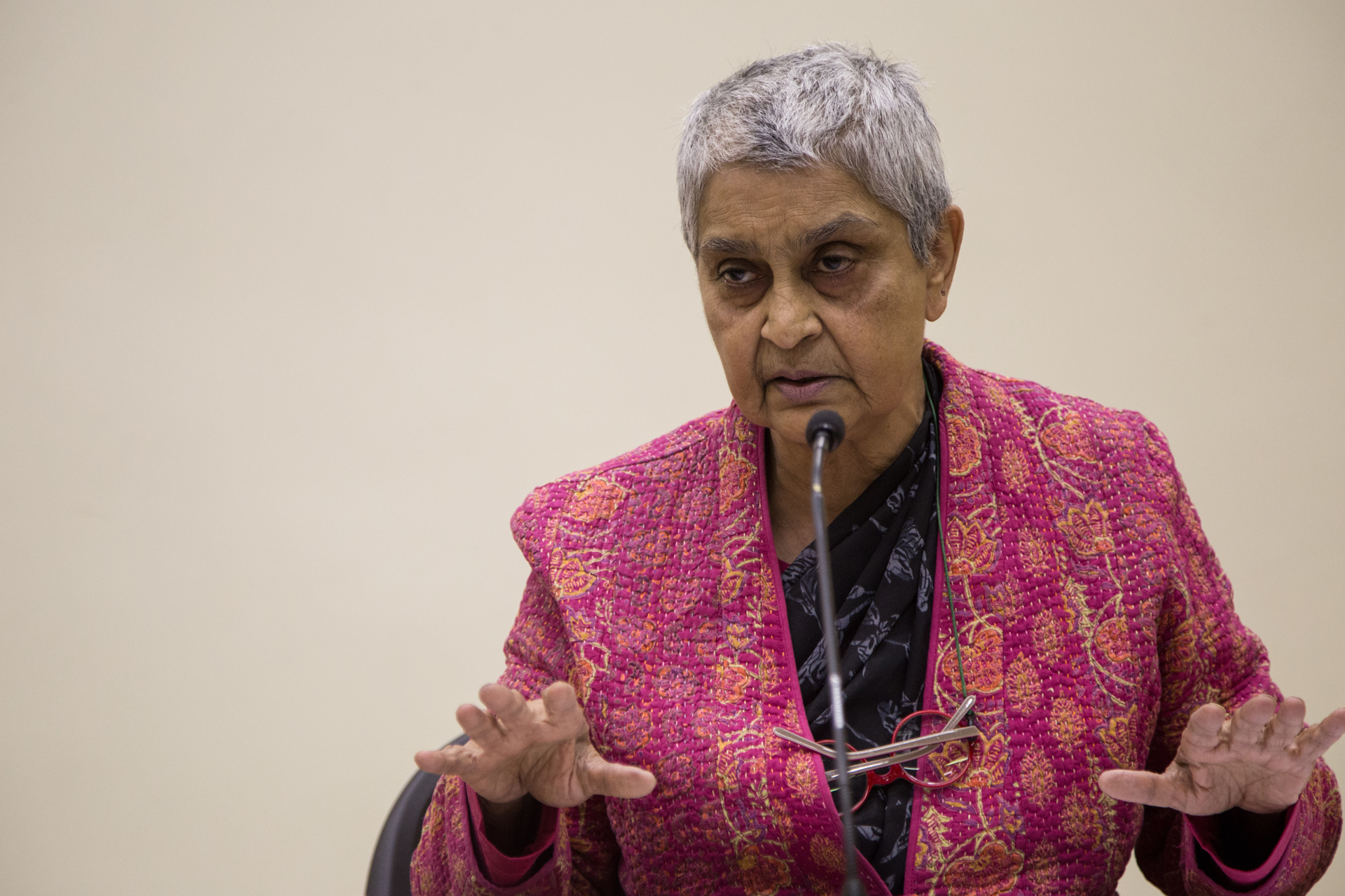
Gayatri Chakravorty Spivak

Postcolonialism in international relations provides the opportunity to give agency to the Third World, pluralizing the subaltern voices heard in the discipline. In mainstream IR, efforts to naturalize historical discourses and accounts of knowledge further emboldens the discipline's Eurocentric roots and in turn, accounts of history. It is through Europe's 18th century international scientific exploration and planetary consciousness that modern Eurocentrism has found itself at the core of mainstream knowledge production. If the concept of a modern state has been exported from Europe to the rest of the planet, one has to look to Europe and its history to understand modern state politics. Therefore, IR's Eurocentrism has been justified, locking in its political interests and obstructing the space for an understanding of past international political systems and the possibility of non-Eurocentric knowledge structures.

Although a postcolonial lens of international relations is becoming increasingly established, it is still marginalized in the wider field of international relations, and there is no consensus among scholars on how to combine postcolonial studies with international relations. Some scholars advocate for the establishment of a postcolonial international relations study that employs reflectivist and interdisciplinary thinking and considers how non-Western thought might transform international relations theory. Some others argue for an alternative outside of the field of international relations because an integration of the two disciplines might limit postcolonial studies and reduce its challenging position in relation to the larger discipline. A middle-ground approach to the question suggests to keep an intellectual distance without completely disengaging from critique of international relations. Proponents of this approach argue that a marginal disciplinary position for postcolonial thought provides advantages to pointing out academic and cultural erasure in knowledge production and the field of international relations. They further insist that there is a need for a continued postcolonial critique of international relations, since the field plays a significant role in the understanding and management of international affairs on the political stage. A revisionist approach to international relations has historically been met with resistance because it would mean a confrontation with the Eurocentric understanding of the discipline.

Through IR's discourse on the proliferation of an international society, the discipline does not depart from its logocentric tendencies. Logocentrism "assumes the priority of the first term and conceives the second in relation to it, as a complication, a negation, a manifestation, a disruption of the first."

=== Coloniality ===
Scholars in postcolonialism address colonial and racial dynamics of coloniality arguing that the structures of power have produced systems and hierarchical orders that have outlived formal colonialism. Cultures have been subsumed into these structures of power structure, making it critical for postcolonialism in international relations to consider theories that have been undervalued as a result of the systematization and prioritization of particular knowledge. In the discipline of International Relations, there are several critiques on the limits of international relations theory made from different lenses – feminist, constructivist, postmodernist, etc. A lens of postcolonialism challenges what Sanjay Seth calls a "centrality accorded to Europe as the historical source and origin of the international order". The postcolonial critique requires scholars to investigate and confront the IR scientific knowledge structures that reflect and replicate the power dynamics that characterize the colonial experience. The critiques calls into question the epistemic privileges granted to specific understandings of knowledge and the standards created from them.

Postcolonialism re-reads colonization as part of an essentially transnational and transcultural "global" process – and it produces a de-centered, diasporic, or "global" rewriting of earlier, nation-centered imperial grand narratives. Postcolonialism can bridges subject areas that are deemed unscientific, subjective, and historically do not meet the standard of this Eurocentric discipline.

=== Impact on culture ===
Postcolonialism is important to international relations because largely absent from strands of scholarship like realism and neorealism are the accounts of cultural theory. In mainstream IR, variables like culture are argued have little to do with how states govern and interact. There are schools in IR like the English School, that do find cultural theory important international relations theory. Robert H. Jackson, Canadian author and academic, is a pluralist in the English School and in his book, The Global Covenant: Human Conduct in a World of States, he established a way to organize international politics that appreciates cultural diversity:

That widespread human proclivity creates a fundamental political problem: the mutual accommodation and orderly coexistence of those assorted political groups that share the finite territory of the planet and cannot usually retreat into splendid isolation. How can their relations be arranged and managed so that they can live side by side in an orderly and peaceful way and enjoy an opportunity to flourish domestically in their own distinctive ways? The international society of locally sovereign states based on the principles of equal sovereignty, territorial integrity, and non‐intervention can be understood as a practical institutional response to that problem. Understood in that way, international society is an arrangement to uphold human equality and human freedom around the world.

== Capitalism in postcolonial IR ==
The postcolonial approach to international relations advances the centrality of colonialism in the making of the modern world. Postcolonial IR scholars argue that colonialism and its processes were necessary to the historic development of global capitalism, which largely defines our economic and political world today.

The field of international political economy, in studying the relationship between politics and the global economy, has largely excluded the significance of colonialism, slavery, and race in explaining global capitalism. Despite classical political economy gaining importance as a field at the height of transatlantic slavery, there is an absence of its importance in economic theory. The omission of colonial processes in the history that is told by IPE is reflective of the Western, liberal-modern worldview in which this scholarship is oriented. Historically, the very idea of the economy, as advanced by the likes of Adam Smith, was conceived of based on a national economy, which ignored the colonial processes taking place at the time. The social sciences in general have based explanations of capitalism in a historical context that does not consider colonialism as central to the development of the capitalist structure.

=== Transatlantic economy ===
Despite insufficient attention in the social sciences, there is a body of critical scholarship written by African American, Caribbean, and African scholars, who center the transatlantic slave trade in the historical development of Europe and of modern capitalism. Unfortunately, this work is sidelined from the mainstream international political economy literature, and is most often relegated to history departments or slavery studies. In 1938, Trinidadian scholar C. L. R. James's book, The Black Jacobins, studied the centrality of the transatlantic slave system to Europe's economy. His work would influence Eric Williams in his book, Capitalism and Slavery in 1944. W. E. B. Du Bois would later build on Williams' argument in an analysis that considers the central role of Africa in world history. Contemporary historian and professor at the University of Rochester, Joseph Inikori, argues that there is a direct relationship between slave-based economies and economic development in Britain. Central to Inikori's argument is how the origins of finance, a defining feature of the global capitalism we recognize today, are found in transatlantic slave-based trade. The major role of financial institutions in global capitalism can be traced to this period, where the development of banking, the stock exchange, insurance companies, and some of the first joint stock companies were created in the context of the transatlantic economy.

Critical scholars of postcolonial IR argue that even within the field, insufficient attention has been paid to how colonialism is part of the global proliferation of capitalism. For instance, Edward Said in his book, Culture and Imperialism, refers to the abstraction of the West, rather than naming capitalism in processes of imperialism. These scholars argue that the abstraction of the West that is used in postcolonial studies understates the central role of capitalism in the world system and the centrality of capitalism in colonialism. They emphasize the forced integration of colonized societies into a hegemonic, capitalist world system, and the destruction of existing ways of life as being central to the story of colonialism. Postcolonial critics problematize the tendency to view capitalism as a historical inevitability, and to equate capitalist development with progress that begins in Europe. When colonialism and transatlantic slavery are acknowledged in the literature, these processes are often placed in the distant past rather than as foundations of our current economic system. The colonization of the Americas by Spain, Portugal, Britain, and the Netherlands in the 16th and 17th centuries created a new Atlantic economic system which rested on the violent capture and transport of over 13 million Africans. This slave-based production fueled the development of industry for Western Europe and directly structured the capitalist present. Between the 16th and 18th centuries, the dispossession of indigenous people from their land and the extraction of their resources was foundational for the economic development of Europe. The development of capitalism was dependent on the simultaneous colonial dispossession in North America and the systematic trade of human beings from Africa. These processes continued beyond the postwar period, with the emergence of welfare states across Europe and in the US. While welfare states were touted as projects for equality under capitalism, the very possibility of them was based on the transfer of resources extracted from colonies. The colonial drain of former colonies resulted in them lagging behind their colonizers, with decolonization offering no reparations for these processes which built European countries and settler colonies.

=== Transnationalism ===
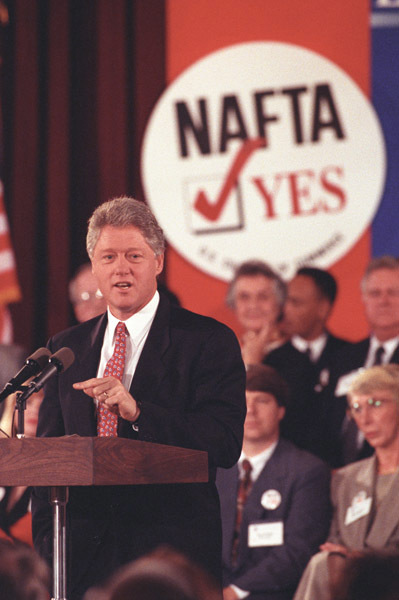
President Bill Clinton at NAFTA Event

Modern global relations are built on the structure of capitalism, which continues patterns of colonialism through domination socially, politically, and culturally. In global capitalism, transnational corporations have de-centered the nation-state as the bearers of economic power (Dirlik, 350). Central to global capitalism as well is an international division of labor and the globalization of the processes of production. This transnationalization of power has resulted in processes both of fragmentation and unity of nations under global capitalism. Despite Europe and the United States experiencing declining power in the world economy as nation-states, they continue to maintain domination through the hegemonic capitalist culture which is based on Eurocentric values. Eurocentrism can be attributed to capitalism, as it was the foundation of Europe's power and the motivating force for their exploits in globalization. On the other hand, fragmentation can be observed in the creation of supranational organizations like the European Economic Community or North American Free Trade Zone, as well as cultural fragmentation seen in multiculturalism. The decline of the nation-state in place of cosmopolitanism and multiculturalism has created a tension between globalization and postcolonialism. Postcolonial critics have labelled the multiculturalism espoused by global capitalism as illusionary, arguing that it is in fact Western cultural hegemony in disguise.

== Notable scholars ==
=== Frantz Fanon ===
Frantz Fanon, also known as Ibrahim Frantz Fanon, was a Martinican-born French West Indian political philosopher and psychiatrist. Having studied under fellow Martinican intellectual, Aimé Césaire, who coined the term, négritude, and likewise was the founder of the Négritude movement, as a young man, Fanon's early intellectual ideas were in large part shaped by those of his mentor. In addition to the intellectual ideas of his mentor, Fanon's work was also in large part shaped by his personal experiences with white European racism under colonialism.

Following the surrender of France to Germany in 1940 during the Second World War and the subsequent establishment of the collaborationist regime of Vichy France, Fanon's native Martinique fell under the occupation of the Vichy French navy. Fanon grew disgusted with the oppressive regime of the occupation, describing the soldiers of the Vichy French occupiers as having shed their masks and behaving like proper, "authentic racists." Upon successfully joining the army of Free France, Fanon was dispatched to the North African theatre war and later Metropolitan France itself. His period of military service led to experience even greater racism, which only further disgusted him. Upon his return to Martinique at the end of the war in 1945, Fanon assisted his former mentor, Césaire, in his bid as a parliamentary delegate of the French Communist Party from Martinique to the National Assembly of French Fourth Republic in Paris. Thereafter, Fanon left for France to study psychiatry and medicine in Lyon.

==== Black Skin, White Masks ====
Initially composed as Fanon's would-be doctoral dissertation concerning negative psychological effects of colonial subjugation on Black people and in large part inspired by Fanon's own personal experiences with racism in France, Fanon's original manuscript was rejected before being published the following year in 1952. Black Skin, White Masks is a historical critique of the construction of Blackness and its origins in the colonisation process. Using psychoanalysis, Fanon dismantles colonial psychological construction of Blackness, giving explanation to the sentiments of inadequacy Black people feel in a White-dominated society or, even dependency on White society for some sense of validation. Fanon expands by asserting that for educated Black people, education and, by extension, assimilation, are tools of escaping their "inferior" status under White colonial regimes. In other words, under colonial regimes, Black people have been severed from their origins and rendered inferior. As a means of upward mobility in White colonial regimes, Black people will attempt to imitate the culture of their White colonisers as a means of being perceived as less inferior.

==== The Wretched of the Earth ====
The Wretched of the Earth (1961) is a psychiatric analysis of the dehumanization of colonial subject peoples under colonialism and is often most well known for its defense of the use of violence by colonized peoples against their colonizers in the struggle to achieve liberation. Presented as an analysis of the impacts of colonialism on personal and societal mental health, The Wretched of the Earth is a sharp criticism of imperialism and nationalism.

Fanon essentializes the indigenous population into three groups: the laborer, valued by the settler for his labor, the "colonized intellectual," valued by the settler for his assimilation into the settler's culture and having become a spokesperson for the settler's culture, and the lumpenproletariat. The third of these groups is borrowed from Marxist theory. While the lumpenproletariat are characterized in Marxist theory as belonging to the lowest, most degraded stratum of the proletariat, those who have so little that they are outside of the system, the population that lacks class consciousness and thus is unable to participate in revolution, Fanon takes a departure from Marxist theory and instead asserts that it is the lumpenproletariat that will first exercise violence on the settler.

=== Edward Said ===
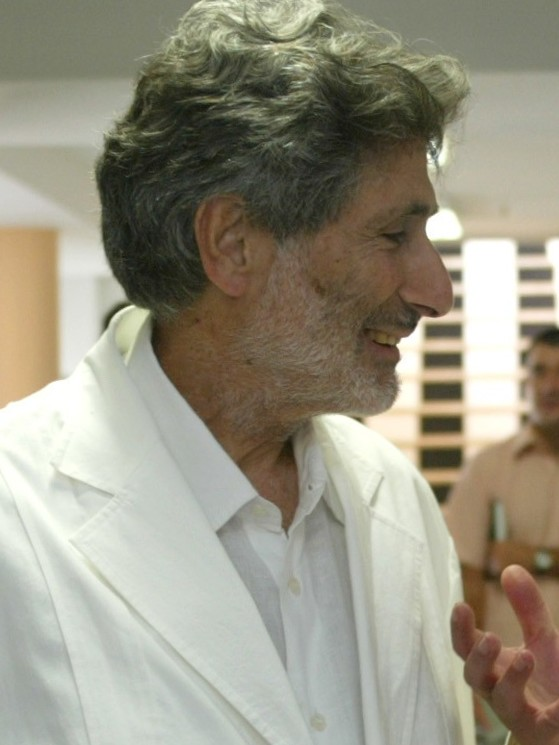
Edward Said and Daniel Barenboim in Sevilla, 2002 (Said)

Edward Said (1935–2003) was a Palestinian American cultural critic who worked as a literature professor at Columbia University. Said was a vocal public intellectual who sought to critique the prevailing representations of the Orient. To Said, literature is neither canonical nor secular; instead, the literary text "is something which has connections with many other aspects of the world—political, social, cultural." Said's writings and ideas laid the foundation for postcolonial studies and would later implicitly transcend postcolonial international relations (IR).

==== Orientalism and the groundwork for postcolonial studies ====
Said established his prominence as a cultural critic through his 1978 magnum opus, Orientalism. In articulating the text's pivotal ideas, he relied upon the influences of Michel Foucault and Antonio Gramsci. Said was informed by Foucault's discourse analysis and power-knowledge to illustrate the power of European culture through its management and production of the Orient. Likewise, Said grounded Orientalism in Gramsci by drawing attention to the overlap between colonial ideology and capital. Orientalism built upon previous scholarship to codify Said's central tenets and help contribute to the emergence of the postcolonial discipline.

==== Connection between postcolonialism and international relations ====
Said's postcolonial discourse exhibited characteristic pertinent to international relations. According to Said, Orientalism is "a considerable dimension of modern political-intellectual culture, and as such has less to do with the Orient than it does with 'our' world." The international dynamic to his literature persisted throughout his 1993 work, Culture and Imperialism. Said explored the lasting implications of British imperialism and the international struggle for decolonization. Literature, like Joseph Conrad's Heart of Darkness, demonstrated a means to convey the global anti-imperialist struggle and the post-imperial reconstruction.

Scholars today argue that Said and his central themes transcend international discourses. To Mark Salter, Said's questions of "power, domination, culture, imperialism, identity and territory" are central to IR and its subsequent criticisms. Moreover, as Bill Ashcroft and Pal Ahluwalia write, Said himself was obsessed with location and fascinated with cultural diversity and heterogeneity. In borrowing from architectural studies, Said located himself within what he called an interstitial space. This "space in between a Palestinian colonial past and an American imperial present" implicitly bridged his ideas within the international context.

==== Neglect in mainstream international relations ====
Said's postcolonial discourse has been largely neglected in canonical IR. Mainstream IR scholarship emphasizes neoliberalism, power politics, and national security. The discipline's longstanding adherence to realist and liberal IR theories limit Said's impact on the field. To Sheila Nair, Said's "marginalization in the IR 'canon' parallels the disenfranchisement, exile, marginality, and oppression he addressed in his work."

Mark Salter writes that while Orientalism's themes pertained to postcolonial IR, its effects on IR discourses were largely silent until the 1990s. It was not until scholars like Phillip Darby, A.J. Paolini, and Sankaran Krishna explicitly bridged postcolonialism with IR that Said's work formally crossed disciplines. In their 1994 article "Bridging International Relations and Postcolonialism", Darby and Paolini write that Orientalism not only failed to "dent the casings of international relations, it received only occasional mention in the literature." Said's emphasis on the "counter-history of the European literary tradition" contributed to the text being ruled out of the mainstream IR.

==== Implicit challenges to mainstream international relations ====
Despite the neglect by mainstream IR, scholars argue that Said's central themes implicitly challenge conventional IR discourses.

===== Power-knowledge =====
In mainstream IR theories such as realism, power derives from the state and its tangible forces. For example, in realism, power relates directly to the high politics of military security and strategic issues. But as Ashcroft and Ahluwalia write, Said articulates that power operates within knowledge: "the processes by which the West 'knows' the Orient have been a way of exerting power on it." Mark Salter claims that mainstream IR theory will benefit from Said's instance on studying power dynamics through imagination and identity. He references terms like the "global war on terror, anti-globalization, [and the] clash of civilizations" as problematic concepts that Said's discourse on power-knowledge can better examine.

===== Traveling theory =====
Said's traveling theory asserts that "theories sometimes 'travel' to other times and situations." Along the way, these theories lose their original power and rebelliousness the farther they travel from the place of their inception. Mark Salter writes that traveling theory "has a particular resonance in IR, where the universalizing claims of 'general theory' are called into question." Mainstream IR, with its emphasis on the "universal, rational and global," assumes theoretical applicability within any time and space. But traveling theory contends that IR's Western-centric theoretical frameworks may not possess the same analytical power within other regions.

===== Contrapuntal reading =====
In borrowing from Western classical music, contrapuntal reading refers to the re-reading of literature from the perspective of the colonized to highlight the submerged voices within canonical texts. According to Said, we begin to read texts "with a simultaneous awareness both of the metropolitan history that is narrated and of those other histories against which the dominating discourse acts." A contrapuntal reading of mainstream IR makes visible the erasures and silences that IR has rendered possible. Academics like Geeta Chowdhry see contrapuntality as a means to "engender the articulation of exiled voices into IR." While mainstream IR is preoccupied with "the state as the unit of analysis"^{31} and the absence of "considerations of gender and ethnicity," "a contrapuntal story about IR narrates a different international relations into existence." Thus, the voices of the colonized emerge as primary agents rather than as passive actors within the colonial story.

==== Beyond Said ====
Edward Said influenced various postcolonial scholars who were later informed by his works to further criticize mainstream IR.

Homi K. Bhabha is an Indian scholar and critical theorist. In a 1995 Artforum interview, Bhabha noted that Said was the writer who most influenced his work. But despite his praise, Bhabha considered Said's interpretation of Orientalism overly unifying; thus, he amended the concept to be "ruptured and hybrid." Bhabha's central idea of hybridity built upon his criticism of Said to assert that cultures are not discrete phenomena; instead, they are always changing and in contact with one another. David Huddart writes that hybridity goes beyond the postcolonial and exhibits implications for discourses of nationalism. Bhabha uses hybridity to "complicate divisions between Western and non-Western identities." While mainstream IR adheres to the common definition of the nation-state, Bhabha built upon Said to reject "the well-defined and stable identity associated with the national form."

Other scholars arrived at their theories irrespective of Said. Nevertheless, some postcolonialists argue that his work combines with other scholars to fill the gaps in postcolonial IR discourse.

V. Y. Mudimbe is a Congolese French philosopher and historian. Ali Mazrui writes that Mudimbe's central thesis is about the invention of Africa whereas Said's is about the invention of the Orient. Despite arising from distinct origins, both scholars challenge the benevolence of Western epistemology while applying it to different global contexts. To Said, Orientalism is "a discipline representing institutionalized Western knowledge of the Orient."^{41} Meanwhile, in The Invention of Africa, Mudimbe states that "Western interpreters [...] have been using categories and conceptual systems which depend on a Western epistemological order." Power dynamics in mainstream IR depend heavily on the state's preferences and capabilities. Mudimbe, like Said, asserts that power is instead situated within knowledge; the latter derives from Western Enlightenment and related modes of inquiry.

=== W.E.B. Du Bois ===
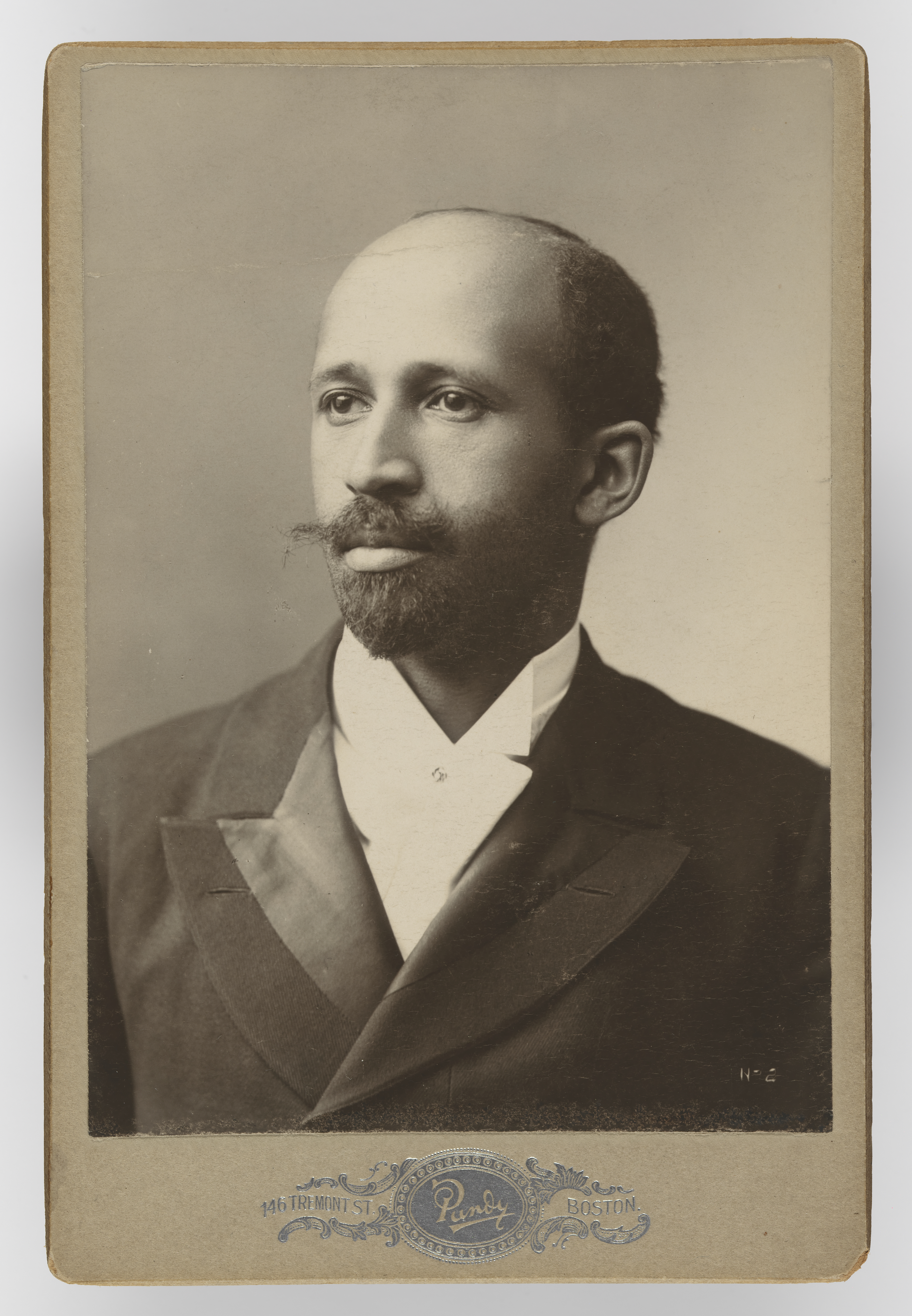
W.E.B. Du Bois

A notable scholar in the study of postcolonial international relations (IR) was W. E. B. Du Bois. Du Bois was a black American man born February 23, 1868, in Great Barrington, Massachusetts, just after the end of the American Civil War. Du Bois died August 22, 1963, in Accra Ghana. Du Bois's scholarship encapsulated how colonial forces work to undermine the black community. Du Bois co-founded a group called the Niagara Movement, a group of neoabolitionists challenging Jim Crow laws, black disenfranchisement, and racial violence. Du Bois co-founded the National Association for the Advancement of Colored People (NAACP) along with other notable African Americans. Du Bois's ideology left an everlasting legacy on postcolonial studies.

Du Bois experienced the dawn of the 20th century, the first century in American history to outlaw slavery. America was still hostile to the idea of respect for the dignity of Black humanity. Black people around America may have been free from the shackles of slavery; nonetheless, the battle was far from over. Black segregation reigned through the United States and brought forth different institutional forms of oppression. As white supremacy persisted, Du Bois's literature and scholarship were centered around the "color line". Racial segregation led to many debates between African American leaders regarding the best course of action for the uplifting of the race. The "colour line" can be described as the division of people according to racial classifications and was rooted in America. Du Bois concluded that one of the ways to combat the oppressive nature of the racial hierarchy was through higher education. Education was crucial for matching the Negro's genius to that of Whites, according to Du Bois. He became a pioneer and advocate for ensuring black people received the highest forms of education. Du Bois's early works such as The Philadelphia Negro showcased his thought process of having a small group of educated, middle-class individuals, the Talented Tenth to be the leaders to lift black people towards success in a White world.

Du Bois was a part of a select group of scholars that author Charisse Burden-Stelly would say are embracing "Radical Black Peace Activism" during the era of the Cold War. Radical Black Peace Activism encompassed the interconnection between the cessation of global conflict, disarmament, non-proliferation, racial equality. Du Bois harnessed the shared principles and was well known for speaking to these points. Du Bois saw a link between the mistreatment of black people through the colonial systems of power and sought a change. Du Bois "argued for the necessity of anti-racism and anti-imperialism alongside antiwar activism." Du Bois helped in pioneering the connection between racism, colonial imperial and a just end to the war. All three of the concepts interworked into the work as a united form of oppression. Du Bois sought to work through colonialism through the means of Radical Black Peace Activism. Du Bois's activism and literature was focused around the effect of antiwar politics enframed the material and political realities of dispossessed persons.

=== Kwame Nkrumah ===
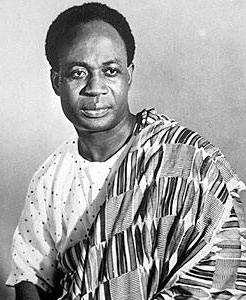
Kwame Nkrumah

Kwame Nkrumah (21 September 1909 – 27 April 1972) was a Ghanaian politician and a revolutionary. Serving as Ghana's first Prime Minister (1957–1960) and President (1960–1966), Nkrumah led the Gold Coast (British colony) independence from the United Kingdom in 1957. Through his devotion to pan-Africanism and socialism, Nkrumah's works and principles substantially contributed to the development of Postcolonialism (international relations) emphasizing the continuation of Neo-colonialism as the 'Last Stage of Imperialism' where the economies of independent states remain directed and exploited by former colonizers. In turn, Nkrumah's prime ministry and presidency saw a commitment to forming a united independent African continent, as seen with his successful forged alliances with African nations, such as Guinea and Mali in aims to create a league of united African states under the Organisation of African Unity.

==== Emphasis of colonial relations in shaping power ====
Postcolonialism centralizes colonial and imperial structures in the formation of academic knowledge and practices, including the dominant theoretical framework of political ideals, such as the liberal nation-state and citizenship. International Relations, as a result, is seen to not 'explain international politics', but rather 'parochially celebrate and defend or promote the West as the proactive subject of 'world politics'. This imbalanced power dynamics, as a result, has left an implicit Euro-centrism in theoretical and empirical literature which postcolonialism critically aims to rid.

Nkrumah's pan-Africanism aimed to explore the theoretical and practical tensions between the non-Western conceptions of citizenship and nation with the dominance of Western modernity. Political pan-Africanism, for Nkrumah, became means to exploring its interactions with the globally pervasive political principles of popular sovereignty and national self-determination, ultimately contributing to postcolonialism IR through attempting to deorientalize and deparochialize IR's liberal conceptions.

==== Re-claiming identity ====
Furthermore, Nkrumah's pan-Africanism noted that the common history of colonialism and enslavement interrupted the expression of the shared heritage of the African people, resulting in a generated cultural confusion which could only be resolved through the 'ethical imposition of the African conscience'. Here, it is clear that such notions contributes to postcolonial IR as it dives deeper into the cultural and psychological effects of colonialism in the mis-shaping of a nation-state identity, left in the hands of former colonisers to complete.

With postcolonialism emerging as a theoretical approach that aimed to provide a discourse for those who had been 'stripped of their authority, culture, and history', its lens on overcoming relations of domination is also evident in Nkrumah's vision of pan-Africanism. In particular, Nkrumah focused upon applying an Afrocentric perspective of history in order to revive an African national consciousness subverted by imperialism. Founding pan-Africanism ideology in the unity and oneness of the African people, Nkrumah believed that the only way to overcome false consciousness of the oppressed was to unite against neocolonialism.

This vision of a "United States of Africa", which required that each African nation forfeited their national autonomy, aimed to combine their economic and industrial development with all of Africa and follow the principle of positive neutralism. Ultimately, the likes of President Ahmed Sékou Touré of Guinea agreed to this vision, leading to the two nations sharing an informal agreement after the Independence of Guinea in 1958. This pledge included creating a union of West African states and solidify their pan-African efforts in the Conakary Agreements. Later on, following a meeting with President Sékou Touré and President Modibo Keïta of Mali in April 1961, all signed a charter which formally established a tripartite Union of African States. This charter envisioned a common diplomatic representation and the creation of committees to draw up arrangements for harmonising economic policies for their countries.

==== Capitalism shaping the colonial world ====
Postcolonial IR scholars intertwine capitalism and colonialism as serving each other, since colonialism is defined as having the "capitalist economic system" which is 'based on the desire for profit through using raw materials and human labor in the colonized countries'. The understandings of capitalism in postcolonialism particularly relies upon Nkrumah's conceptualization of neocolonialism, which demonstrated the ongoing imperialist conditions that former colonized remain subject to, exploitation of their foreign capital.

Developed during the Cold War environment, Nkrumah believed that the major political weapon of the capitalist–imperialist was the false consciousness, his work reflected the ongoing transformations to the traditional structures of imperialism and territorial colonialization in the West. In following the theoretical framework of economic imperialism by Vladimir Lenin, Nkrumah describes imperialist nations as deliberately perpetuating African poverty and structural economic backwards, whilst Western nations enrich themselves at the expense of the African economies and peoples. Since the 'dangers of Communist subversion' became a growing concern in affecting former colonized nations, Nkrumah describes the West's realization of this occurring as 'two-edged', as it brought notice to the possibility of a change in regime to socialism. Nkrumah intended to fend off imperialist influence through a 'scientific socialist' form of unity, acting as a further reaction along with postcolonialism IR against global capitalism's dominance of economic modernity. Whilst Nkrumah's vision of a united African society was 'explicitly consonant with Marxist–Leninist theory', Nkrumah still contributed to postcolonialism IR on capitalism through extended the concept of class to a global scale beyond economics; identifying a global class of oppressed peoples, rather than focusing on the traditional class struggle between the proletariat and the bourgeoisie. Therefore, the acting up of the West, through means such as foreign aid which Nkrumah denounces, meant imperialist nations could maintain their influence and monopolise to dominate African nations and seize their materials.

Ultimately for Nkrumah, the developed countries in the Global North succeeded through 'exporting their internal problems and transferring the conflict between rich and power from the national to the international stage'. Therefore, postcolonialism and his vision of Pan-Africanism aligned in viewing class struggle as the foundations of imperialism, seeing class alliance amongst Africans as the necessary revolution to solve this.

==== Critiques of contribution ====
Professor Ali Mazrui criticized the persona of Nkrumah in 'Nkrumah: The Leninist Czar', as he criticized Nkrumah's efforts to present himself as the 'African Lenin', seen with his belief in the organization of the colonial masses. For Mazuri, the theory of neocolonialism proposed is nothing more than an attempt to resolve the difficulty surrounding his coup d'état by the National Liberation Council in 1966. This theory is seen as a recycling of the works of Lenin's attempts to carry Karl Marx's analysis of capitalism a stage further, as Nkrumah only contributes to this through attempting to carry Lenin's analysis of imperialism a level higher. From here, Mazuri proclaims that this new "phenomenon" of neocolonialism lacked the inner constraint accountability; it was the most irresponsible form of imperialism.

===== Counter-critiques =====
Omafume Onoge and Kinou A. Gaching'a depicted Mazuri's critique as an "excellent illustration" of the misdirected brilliance of African scholarship. They discredit Mazuri's representation of Nkrumah as a puppet of Lenin, as he dismisses non-congruent facts in order to preserve his elegant model. More credit, they argue, needs to be given to the work that Nkrumah has done for the African continent, whilst concluding that Mazuri either did not understand the implications of the centrality of neo-colonialism for Nkrumah's political and action actions.

=== Jalal Al-e Ahmad ===
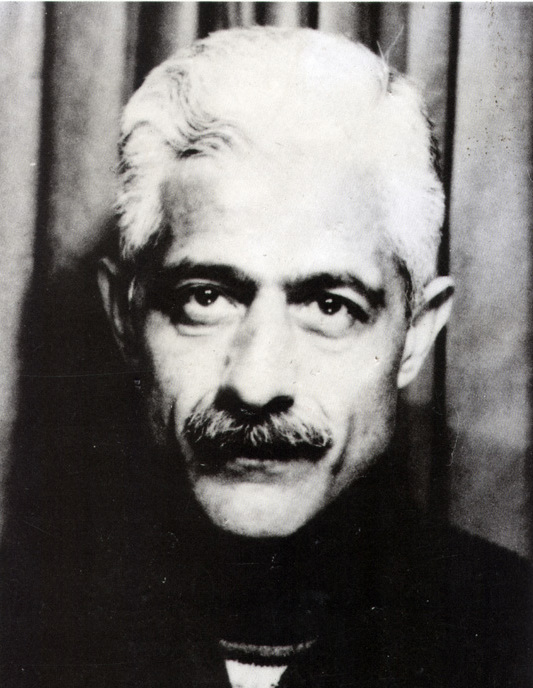
Jalal Al-e-Ahmad

Jalal Al-e Ahmad, an Iranian writer, social critic, and ethnographer, was one of the most prominent critics of Western modernization and cultural influence in the country's history. Though never formally colonized, Iran was a constant target for the imperial British and Russian empires during the Qajar and later the Pahlavi dynasties. After growing up in a devoutly religious family in Tehran, Al-e Ahmad initially rejected the clerical path his family had determined for him and instead joined the Marxist Tudeh Party of Iran, whose ideals of Third World socialism introduced Al-e Ahmad to notable anticolonial thinkers and influenced his later works. Disillusioned by the Party's Soviet allegiances, he turned towards the anticolonial, secular nationalists led by Prime Minister Mohammad Mosaddegh. Though his nationalization of Iran's oil industry in 1951 remains a notable instance of Iranian anticolonial resistance, Mosaddegh was later deposed in a Western-backed coup. The fall of the nationalists from power saw Al-e Ahmad lose interest in organized politics and return to literature, poetry, and anthropology. He would eventually discover a renewed interest in Islam and its role in Iranian culture and history—completing his ideological journey. These political transformations reflected the complexity of Iranian politics at the time and led to him being referred to as "a socialist, an anticolonial nationalist, and a towering Muslim intellectual." It was during this time that he wrote his most seminal work: Gharbzadegi.

Originally coined as a term by Iranian philosopher Ahmad Fardid, gharbzadegi has been variously translated as Occidentosis, West-struck-ness, or Westoxification, and refers to what Al-e Ahmad saw as the malignant influence of Western systems of economics, education, and culture and the transformation of Iran into a dependent consumer of Western goods. Published in 1962 as Occidentosis: A Plague From the West, Al-e Ahmad likens occidentosis to a disease, an "accident from without, spreading in an environment rendered susceptible to it." He delineates two camps: the Occident—the industrialized nations of Europe and North America—and the "hungry nations" of Africa, Asia, Latin America, and the Middle East that provide the raw materials that the Occident transforms into purchasable goods. Occidentosis describes the era in which the East—the hungry nations of the world—have not yet "developed the machine", and instead are subservient to the Western nations that sell their refined products back to them.

However, Al-e Ahmad's analysis goes beyond material concerns, as he also views international organizations such as the United Nations and UNESCO as tools of the West. The days of old were characterized by colonial and imperial contact being made and the first Western emissaries holding great influence over the East through their goods. At the time of writing Gharbzadegi, Al-e Ahmad claims that national liberation movements and the nationalization of resources have forced Western countries to shift their tactics. Now, the Western emissaries arrive in more "acceptable garb" as consultants and advisors for organizations like UNESCO. This change also saw the West desire more than just the raw materials they had been extracting and importing—they began also gathering and studying the "abundant spiritual goods" of the East. The myths, religions, cultures, and anthropologies of the Eastern world became the object of interest of Western academics and intellectuals. Despite this, Al-e Ahmad contends that occidentosis has caused many Iranians to ignore and minimize their own art, music, traditions, and histories. "Why shouldn't the nations of the East wake up to see what treasures they hold?", he asks.^{24}

While critics have accused Jalal Al-e Ahmad of being against modernity, some scholars contend that his criticism was instead focused on coloniality. As one academic stated, Al-e Ahmad "was critical of colonial modernity; he was not antimodern." His critiques of modernization theory place him among the ranks of Third World intellectuals who desired sovereignty and self-determination over imposed "modernization." Al-e Ahmad opposed not all production, but Western production that replaced native industries.

Scholars have compared Al-e Ahmad's work to many key figures in the field of postcolonialism and postcolonial international relations. His criticisms of modernization theory have been compared to the maintenance of the "colour line" that W.E.B. Du Bois spoke of. The "double consciousness" outlined by the American sociologist in The Souls of Black Folk is another parallel that has been drawn with the work of Al-e Ahmad. Du Bois describes this phenomenon as a "sense of always looking at one's self through the eyes of others." Al-e Ahmad claimed that Iranians faced a similar dilemma; their minds were occupied by thoughts of being witnessed by the West. He also saw strains of Western racial dominance reflected in the modernization and reform programs initiated by the Pahlavi regime, particularly in their emphasis on Aryan purity and untainted Persian history.

Al-e Ahmad's contributions to anticolonialism are also displayed through portions of Gharbzadegi where he writes about the solidarity between the "hungry" Eastern nations. Mimicking the language used by the West, he writes, "... we—the Iranians—fall into the category of the backward and developing nations: we have more points in common with them than points of difference." In summarizing his view of international relations, he says, "I speak of solidarity with progressive human societies." Gharbzadegi represented a turning point in Iranian political thought, particularly in regards to Iran's understanding of itself as a postcolonial entity. While many anticolonial and anti-imperial critiques had been written, they were often still created as a product relative to and derivative of Western thought. Jalal Al-e Ahmad's references to Iranian culture, heritage, politics, and history represented a more authentic critique of the international order.

== Criticism ==
Mainstream IR stories are purposefully limited in scope in terms of state-centric modelling, cataloguing and predicting in formal terms; and like other postpositivist theories, they do not attempt to form an overarching theory as after all, postpositivism is defined as incredulity towards metanarratives. This is replaced by a sensitivity and openness to the unintended consequences of metanarratives and their negative impacts on the most marginalised actors in IR. In defence, postpositivists argue that metanarratives have proven unworkable. Approaches such as postcolonial IR theories, although limited in scope, provide for much greater possibilities in the normative work of developing an emancipatory politics, formulating foreign policy, understanding conflict, and making peace, which takes into account gender, ethnicity, other identity issues, culture, methodology and other common issues that have emerged from problem-solving, rationalist, reductive accounts IR.

== See also ==
- International relations theory
