= Green theory =

Environmental theory of international relations

Green theory is a theory of international relations (IR). In contrast to mainstream theories of IR, it posits environmental issues as central to the study of international relations. According to green theory, mainstream theories like neorealism and neoliberalism fail to understand environmental problems through their rationalist and state-centric frameworks of analysis. Green theory focuses on the study of global justice, international development, modernization, and security. But also the management of pool resources such as the atmosphere, oceans, and the major river systems. The Green perspectives in IR emerged in the 1970s as a response to the increase of transnational issues related to the environment. By the end of the 20th century, green theory had established itself within the discipline. Green theory aligns itself with postpositivism that emerged from the so-called third (or fourth) debate of IR. The theory can be divided into an international political economy-oriented wing and a cosmopolitan wing. Initially, the IPE wing, mainly interested in environmental regimes, was stronger, but subsequently many cosmopolitan theorists, like David Held, Andrew Linklater, Henry Shue, and Thomas Pogge, have made contributions related to environmental issues.

== See also ==
- Climate change
- "The Coming Anarchy"
- Critical international relations theory
- Ecofeminism
- Ecocentrism
- Green politics
- The Limits to Growth
- Sustainable development
- Tragedy of the commons
