= Postpositive =

Postpositive may mean:

- in philosophy, related to postpositivism, a development of positivism
- in grammar, following a related word or phrase, as with a postpositive adjective

== See also ==
- Postpositivism (international relations)
- Preposition and postposition
