= Reflectivism =

Aspect of International Relations theory

Reflectivism is an umbrella label used in International Relations theory for a range of theoretical approaches which oppose rational-choice accounts of social phenomena and positivism generally. The label was popularised by Robert Keohane in his presidential address to the International Studies Association in 1988. The address was entitled "International Institutions: Two Approaches", and contrasted two broad approaches to the study of international institutions (and international phenomena more generally). One was "rationalism", the other what Keohane referred to as "reflectivism". Rationalists — including realists, neo-realists, liberals, neo-liberals, and scholars using game-theoretic or expected-utility models — are theorists who adopt the broad theoretical and ontological commitments of rational-choice theory.

== Rationalism vs. reflectivism ==
Keohane characterised rationalism in the following fashion:

[Rationalists accept] what Herbert Simon has referred to a "substantive" conception of rationality, characterizing "behaviour that can be adjudged objectively to be optimally adapted to the situation" (Simon, 1985:294). As Simon has argued, the principle of substantive rationality generates hypotheses about actual human behaviour only when it is combined with certain auxiliary assumptions about the structure of utility functions and the formation of expectations.

Since this research program is rooted in exchange theory, it assumes scarcity and competition as well as rationality on the part of the actors. Rationalistic theories of institutions view institutions as affecting patterns of costs.

Keohane went on to contrast this with the approach of "reflective" scholars:

These authors, of whom the best-known include Hayward Alker, Richard Ashley, Friedrich Kratochwil, and John Ruggie, emphasize the importance of the "intersubjective meanings" of international institutional activity (Kratochwil and Ruggie, 1986:765). In their view, understanding how people think about institutional norms and rules, and the discourse they engage in, is as important in evaluating the significance of these norms as measuring the behavior that changes in response to their invocation.

These writers emphasize that individuals, local organizations, and even states develop within the context of more encompassing institutions. Institutions do not merely reflect the preferences and power of the units constituting them; the institutions themselves shape those preferences and that power. Institutions are therefore constitutive of actors as well as vice versa. It is therefore not sufficient in this view to treat the preferences of individuals as given exogenously: they are affected by institutional arrangements, by prevailing norms, and by historically contingent discourse among people seeking to pursue their purposes and solve their self-defined problems.

[I]t would be fair to refer to them as "interpretive" scholars, since they all emphasize the importance of historical and textual interpretation and the limitations of scientific models in studying world politics. But other approaches also have a right to be considered interpretive. I have therefore coined a phrase for these writers, calling them "reflective", since all of them emphasize the importance of human reflection for the nature of institutions and ultimately for the character of world politics.

Reflectivism and rationalism are typically used as labels applying not just to the study of international institutions, but of international relations more widely, and even the social world as a whole. Sociologies and histories of the International Relations discipline have sometimes used the opposition between these approaches to describe one of the central fault-lines within the discipline.

== Reflexivity ==
There may be another sense, not specifically discussed by Keohane, in which the label is apt. Reflectivist scholars tend to emphasise the inherent reflexivity both of theory and of the social world it studies. Unlike the term reflectivism, the concept of "reflexivity" has wide currency outside of international relations, having come to prominence in social theory in the latter part of the 20th century. Reflexivity refers to the ways in which elements and phenomena in social life have the capacity to "fold in on", or be "directed towards", themselves. That is, they can produce effects on, or have implications for, their own features, dynamics and existence. An example is the "self-fulfilling prophecy" (or "self-disconfirming prophecy") — a situation in which merely describing, predicting, imagining or believing something to be the case may eventually result in its actually coming to be the case. More generally, reflectivists emphasise the significance of human self-awareness: the ways people observe, imagine, describe, predict and theorise about themselves and the social reality around them, and the recursive effect this "self-knowledge" or these "reflections" have on that social reality itself. Some scholars link reflexivity with the broader debate, within International Relations theory and social theory more generally, over the relationship between "agency" and "structure" in the social world. That is, the relationship between people's capacity to "freely" choose their actions and/or to "make a real difference" to the world around them, and the social "structures" in which people are always embedded, and which may powerfully shape – often against their will or in ways they are unaware of – the kinds of things they are able to do.

Reflectivists also often claim that studying and theorising about international relations can be, should be, and are necessarily, reflexive. For one thing, they claim, theories about social reality may affect – might change – social reality itself. Some critics of (neo-)realism have raised the possibility that realist theories, for instance, may act as self-fulfilling prophecies. To the extent that they are taken by theorists and practitioners to be the "common sense" of international politics, diplomacy and policy-making, those theories may encourage precisely the kind of mistrust, ruthless competition and amorality that they posit to be natural and inherent features of the international realm. Familiar methodological examples of the capacity of observation and theorising to affect the object/phenomena of study include the "observer-expectancy effect" and long-running concerns among anthropologists and ethnographers over the possible effect of participant observation on the very people and behaviours being studied.

Furthermore, reflectivists argue, those theories invariably reflect in important ways the social context in which they were produced; so in a sense the social world shapes the theories made of it. There is often a normative or ethical aspect to the emphasis on reflexivity. Reflectivists often argue that theorists should be as self-aware as possible — to reflect as much as possible on the influences (assumptions, biases, normative commitments, etc.) that feed into and shape the theories they produce. In addition, they should be able to hold their own theories to the standards and arguments they set out in those same theories. And finally, they should reflect on the likely and possible effects of their theorising. Some reflectivists (e.g. those of a post-structuralist persuasion) have argued that theorising should itself be understood as a practice, like the human practices that theories study; that it is an act (conscious or unconscious) of intervention into social reality, and that as such it is never "innocent" or "neutral", and there is a degree of responsibility for its consequences that theorists cannot (and should not try to) escape.

== Reflectivism and post-positivism ==
Reflectivist approaches include constructivism, feminism, post-structuralism, post-colonialism and Critical Theory. The challenge launched by these approaches against rationalist approaches, which have largely dominated the IR discipline for the past three decades, was linked to the "Third Debate in International Relations" between positivists and post-positivists/anti-positivists. (The first two disciplinary "Great Debates" are supposed to have pitted (1) realists vs. so-called "idealists", and (2) behaviouralists vs. so-called "traditionalists", the latter favouring historical methods and insights from political philosophy.) Although the large majority of reflectivists oppose positivism, it might be a mistake to equate reflectivism with post-positivism or anti-positivism, as (conventional) constructivists who are positivist in orientation would nevertheless fall under Keohane's description. Confusion may be compounded by the fact that in International Relations theory, rationalism and positivism can often be (erroneously) equated. There are many positivist political scientists who do not adopt rational-choice assumptions.

Some mainstream International Relations scholars, dismissing the importance or value of non-positivist approaches to social science, have reframed the rationalism-reflectivism debate narrowly, as a debate between rationalism and ("conventional") constructivism, construed as the two major social theories (or "ontologies") of (mainstream) International Relations theory. The rationalism-constructivism debate drew considerable attention within the mainstream at the turn of the 21st century, with some rejecting the starkness of the opposition itself and asserting a fundamental compatibility, or possibility of synthesis, between the two approaches.

== Criticism of reflectivist approaches ==
The main criticisms of reflectivist approaches stem from the epistemological differences between reflectivism and what in the social sciences has come to be known as positivism. Since the 1970s, mainstream International Relations theory has become increasingly, and more insistently, positivist in epistemological orientation. The typical reflectivist rejection of positivist assumptions and methods has led to criticism that the approach cannot make reliable statements about the outside world and even that it has repudiated the entire "social science enterprise". Such criticisms are widespread in American political science, and reflectivism is not generally popular in U.S.-based IR scholarship, especially when compared with scholarship originating in Europe and the third world.

== See also ==
- Antipositivism
- Postpositivism
- Self-reflection
- Sensemaking
