= Great Debates (international relations) =

Disagreements between IR scholars

In international relations theory, the Great Debates are a series of disagreements between international relations scholars. Ashworth describes how the discipline of international relations has been heavily influenced by historical narratives and that "no single idea has been more influential" than the notion that there was a debate between utopian and realist thinking.

== First Great Debate ==
The "First Great Debate" also known as the "Realist-Idealist Great Debate" was a dispute between idealists and realists which took place in the 1920s and 1930s and which was fundamentally about how to deal with Nazi Germany. Realist scholars emphasized the anarchical nature of international politics and the need for state survival. Idealists emphasized the possibility of international institutions such as the League of Nations. However, some have argued that defining the debate between realism and idealism in terms of a great debate is a misleading caricature and so described the "great debate" as a myth.

According to revisionist narrative, there was never a single 'great debate' between idealism and realism. Lucian M. Ashworth argues, the persistence of the notion that there was a real debate between idealism and realism says less about the actual discussions of the time, and more about the marginalisation of liberal and normative thinking in international relations in the post-war period. Richard Devetak wrote in his international relations textbook:

The structure of Carr’s masterpiece revolves around the dichotomy between realism and liberalism. In fact, he helped create the impression that the newly established discipline was dominated by a debate between realism and liberalism. This subsequently became known as the ‘first great debate’, although – as Andreas Osiander (1998), Peter Wilson (1998), Lucian Ashworth (1999), and Quirk and Vigneswaran (2005) have shown – no debate actually occurred, if by that we mean a series of exchanges between realists and liberals. Indeed, recent work suggests that the very idea of narrating the discipline’s history as a series of ‘great debates’ is questionable. Even so, it is important for students to learn and appreciate the stories the discipline has told about itself, which is why I persist with the narrative.

== Second Great Debate ==
The "Second Great Debate" was a dispute between "scientific IR" scholars who sought to refine scientific methods of inquiry in international relations theory and those who insisted on a more historicist/interpretative approach to international relations theory. The debate is termed "realists versus behaviourists" or "traditionalism versus scientism". This debate would be resolved when neorealists such as Kenneth Waltz (1959, 1979) adopt a Behaviouralist, and hence positivist scientific approach to their studies.

== Third Great Debate ==
The "Third Great Debate" refers to the interparadigm debate between proponents of liberalist, realist and Marxist international relations theories, as well as the academic debate between proponents of realism, institutionalism and structuralism. This debate was topical during the 1970s and 1980s.

=== Criticism ===
Some scholars have lamented the so-called "paradigm wars", particularly between (neo)realism and (neo)liberalism. Jack S. Levy argues that while the realism-liberalism debate “has imposed some order on a chaotic field,” the distinction ignores diversity within each of the two camps and inhibits attempts at synthesis. Levy suggests instead focusing on making testable predictions and leaving “the question of whether a particular approach fits into a liberal or realist framework to the intellectual historians.” Bear F. Braumoeller likewise proposes that the “temporary theoretical convenience” of separating realism and liberalism “was transformed into ossified ontology” that inhibited attempts at theoretical synthesis. Socialization also leads to a situation where “scholars working primarily within one paradigm who attempt [to combine paradigms] are likely to be chastised for theoretical impurity.”

== Fourth Great Debate ==
The "Fourth Great Debate" was a debate between positivist theories and post-positivist theories of international relations. Confusingly, it is often described in literature as "The Third Great Debate" by those who reject the description of the inter-paradigm debate as a Great Debate. This debate is concerned with the underlying epistemology of international relations scholarship and is also described as a debate between "rationalists" and "reflectivists". The debate was started by Robert Keohane in an International Studies Association debate in 1988 and can be considered an epistemological debate, about how we can know 'things' rather than an ontological one, that is to say, a debate about what we can claim to know. As Balzacq and Baele summarize, this debate is "a discussion which, in the 1980s and 1990s, followed a composite claim for a more diverse, less epistemologically and ontologically naïve, and more critical IR".

== Fifth Great Debate ==
The "Fifth Great Debate" is the most recent debate that emerged in the 2010s and is centered around how to respond to the challenges posed by global inequality, climate change, and other transnational issues that require collective action. On one side of the debate are the globalists, who argue that the solution to these challenges lies in greater cooperation and integration among nations and the development of a more robust system of global governance. Globalists believe that international institutions, such as the United Nations and the International Monetary Fund, should be strengthened and given more authority to address global issues. One of its representatives, Emilian Kavalski, has made significant contributions to the field of complexity theory, particularly in the areas of global governance and the decentralization of international relations theory and practice, which relates to the growing prominence of non-Western (especially Asian) international actors and the noticeable impact of global climate change. In particular, he explores the nascent Asian normative orders, how they confront, complement, and transform established traditions, norms, and institutions, and the encounter of international relations with life in the Anthropocene, especially the conceptualization of and engagement with non-human actors. Kavalski contends that in both these areas, the concept and practices of relationality have essential implications for how global life is approached, explained, and understood.

== See also ==
- Rationalist–constructivist debate
