= Marxist international relations theory =

Marxist and neo-Marxist international relations theories are paradigms which reject the realist/liberal view of state conflict or cooperation, instead focusing on the economic and material aspects. It purports to reveal how the economy trumps other concerns, which allows for the elevation of class as the focus of the study.

== Marxism ==
In the 19th century, Karl Marx and Friedrich Engels wrote that the main source of instability in the international system would be capitalist globalization, more specifically the conflict between two classes: the national bourgeoisie and the cosmopolitan proletariat. Historical materialism was going to be Marxism's guideline in understanding the processes both in domestic and international affairs. Thus, for Marx human history has been a struggle to satisfy material needs and to resist class domination and exploitation. Despite ideological criticism, Marxism has strong empirical advantages on its side. Firstly, by emphasizing injustice and inequality it is very relevant to every period of time as these two failures of the human society have never been absent. Marxism is a structural theory just like neorealism, but it focuses on the economic sector instead of the military-political one. Its analysis reflects the relation between the base (the modes of production) and the superstructure (political institutions). The source of structural effects is not anarchy, but the capitalist mode of production which defines unjust political institutions and state relations.

This economic reductionism is considered also to be a central flaw. As a solution, the neo-Gramscian school proposed a further development. By combining global capitalism, state structure and political-economic institutions, they managed to create a theory of global hegemony (ideological domination). According to this theory, hegemony is maintained through close cooperation between powerful elites inside and outside the core regions of the world system. Global governance is constituted by political and economic institutions that put pressure on the less developed and unstable peripheral countries.

From an epistemological point of view, Marxism created the foundations for critical theory and it is superior in this sense to the dominant approaches of Anglo-American international relations that are problem-solving theories. As any other critical theory, Marxism has a normative interest in identifying possibilities for social transformation and how theory is instrumental to power. This is why Marx wrote about capitalism with an interest in the social forces that would bring about its downfall hoping that humanity would be free from domination and exploitation. Realists in particular see this to be politically motivated and not objective and neutral. The normative disadvantage of Marxism is that it can be seen as Eurocentric by promoting the Enlightenment ideal of cosmopolitanism.

== Dependency theory ==
Linked in with Marxist theories is dependency theory which argues that developed countries in their pursuit of power penetrate developing states through political advisors, missionaries, experts and multi-national corporations (MNCs) to integrate them into the capitalist system in order to appropriate natural resources and foster dependence by developing countries on developed countries.

== Criticisms ==
Realists and liberals criticize Marxist conflict theories for ideological and consequentialist reasons. Postpositivists disagree with Marxists' elevation of class conflict as the most significant aspect of human life and the key to understanding all human history and behavior.

Marxist international relations theories are marginal in United States academia. A 2018 study by Sclofsky and Funk concluded that, of the introductory international relations classes given in the top 10 graduate political science programs in the US, only one made Marx a mandatory reading, and another made it optional.^{,}

== See also ==
- Critical international relations theory
- International relations theory
- Theories of imperialism
- Marxist explanations of warfare
