= Rationalist–constructivist debate =

Ontological debate

The rationalist–constructivist debate is an ontological debate within international relations theory between rationalism and constructivism. In a 1998 article, Christian Reus-Smit and Richard Price suggested that the rationalist–constructivist debate was, or was about to become, the most significant in the discipline of international relations theory. The debate can be seen as to be centered on preference formation, with rationalist theories (such as neorealism) characterising changes in terms of shifts in capabilities, whereas constructivists focus on preference formation.

== Rationalism ==
Rationalists subscribe to positivism, the idea that scientific enquiry must rely upon empirical validation or falsification. Rationalist theories such as neorealism and neoliberalism also have exogeneously given preferences such as can be seen in Kenneth Waltz's Theory of International Politics, where anarchy is a structural constraint on state behavior.

== Constructivism ==
Constructivists have been seen to challenge the assumptions of rationalism in arguing that the social world is constructed. They emphasize the importance of norms and ideas in international relations.

== Bridging the divide ==
Zehfuss argues that it is wrong to characterise the dialogue between the two theories as a debate due to the lack of debate between them in key international relations journals. Leading rationalist James Fearon and leading constructivist Alexander Wendt argued in an article in 2002 that some form of synthesis between the two theories is possible, and that the two perspectives should have been seen primarily as methodological tools rather than diametrically opposed ontologies.

Meanwhile, political economist Robyn Klingler-Vidra further substantiated the debate in her book addressing that contextualism and rationality are often construed as diametric opposites. The phrase contextual rationality means that policymakers are rational in that they have excellent computational ability and that their preferences are rooted in their normative context. Norms and identities – the key arenas for constructivist study – are not rational, and as such, are left out of rationalist models and arguments. Mainstream economic models depicts actors as rational, meaning that actors have “impressively clear and voluminous,” if not absolutely complete, knowledge; the rational actor exhibits a well-organized and stable system of preferences; and possesses a strong computational skill (Herbert Simon 1955, 99). When the rational man learns, makes optimal choices according to a cost-benefit analysis that maximizes utility by minimizing risk.

On the other hand, scholarship that examines context, such as norms, culture, and institutions, as the core analytical object seeks to explain why locales pursue often idiosyncratic actions. Explanations emanating from context as the analytical inroads, reveal variance, diversity, and specificity through qualitative research methods. To illustrate, Context-specific explanations, as one would expect, repudiate the idea that rational actor models could account for the variety of preferences caused by distinct (local) experiences.

Contextual rationality is an alternative depiction of rationality. Psychology and behavioural economics notion of “bounded rationality”posit that rationality is limited or incomplete, as actors’ learning and decision-making processes are abbreviated by their cognitive biases. More than the delimiting of rationality due to incomplete information; cognitive psychology research by scholars such as Danny Kahneman and Amos Tversky, show that actors rely on cognitive shortcuts to learn and to make decisions, and these shortcuts help them to skirt the rational analytical process. Such cognitive heuristics make learning and decision making “easier.” Cognitive biases point actors toward studying and replicating models that are representative and available, and being “anchored” by models. The starting information—the anchor—exerts drag on actors' ability or desire to act in too different in a manner than they observe.

Different than traditional accounts of rationality or bounded rationality, contextual rationality bridges the constructivist-rationalist divide by contending that actors are rational; they are computationally able to process information, they access large swathes of information and their system of preferences is consistent and stable. At the same time, their computations are context-based because preferences are derived from norms that inform how the actors see themselves (their “identity”). Contextually rooted appropriateness, not technical efficiency, underpins the cost-benefit calculations performed in the learning process. Norms do more than constrain behaviors expected by rational actor models, or subvert otherwise robotic decision-making processes; norms are the bedrock for identity, and as such, preferences that inform rationality. With contextual rationality as the basis, we can better learn, and design, policies and systems that can build on local context.

== See also ==
- Great Debates in international relations theory
