= Critical international relations theory =

Global justice theory

Critical international relations theory is a diverse set of schools of thought in international relations (IR) that have criticized the theoretical, meta-theoretical and/or political status quo, both in IR theory and in international politics more broadly – from positivist as well as postpositivist positions. Positivist critiques include Marxist and neo-Marxist approaches and certain ("conventional") strands of social constructivism. Postpositivist critiques include poststructuralist, postcolonial, "critical" constructivist, critical theory (in the strict sense used by the Frankfurt School), neo-Gramscian, most feminist, and some English School approaches, as well as non-Weberian historical sociology, "international political sociology", "critical geopolitics", and the so-called "new materialism" (partly inspired by actor–network theory). All of these latter approaches differ from both realism and liberalism in their epistemological and ontological premises.

== See also ==
- Feminism (international relations)
- Postcolonialism (international relations)
- Postmodernism (international relations)
