= List of European literatures =

This is a list of European literatures.

The literatures of Europe are compiled in many languages; among the most important of the modern written works are those in English, French, Spanish, Dutch, Polish, Portuguese, German, Italian, Modern Greek, Czech, Russian, Macedonian, the Scandinavian languages, Gaelic and Turkish.

Important classical and medieval European literary traditions are those in Latin, Ancient Greek, Old Bulgarian, Macedonian, Old Norse, Medieval French and the Italian Tuscan dialect of the renaissance.

== See also ==
- Western literature
- Medieval literature
- Renaissance literature
- Old English literature
- British literature
- Welsh literature in English
- Scottish literature
- Irish literature
- Francophone literature
- Cypriot literature
- Nordic literature
- Galician-Portuguese lyric
- Ottoman poetry
- Arabic literature in Al-Andalus
- MLN: Modern Language Notes
- African literature
- Asian literature
- Oceanic literature
- Latin American literature
- Esperanto literature
