= Complex interdependence =

Concept in international relations

World Map

Complex interdependence in international relations and international political economy is a concept put forth by Robert Keohane and Joseph Nye in the 1970s to describe the emerging nature of the global political economy. The concept entails that relations between states are becoming increasingly deep and complex. These increasingly complex webs of economic interdependence undermine state power and elevate the influence of transnational non-state actors. These complex relationships can be explored through both the liberalism and realism lenses and can later explain the debate of power from complex interdependence.

== History of the term ==
The term "complex interdependence" was claimed by Raymond Leslie Buell in 1925 to describe the new ordering among economies, cultures, and races. The very concept was popularized through the work of Richard N. Cooper (1968). With the analytical construct of complex interdependence in their critique of political realism, Robert Keohane and Joseph Nye explore how international politics forever changed due to the emerging complex interactions and interdependence among states. The theorists recognized that the various and complex transnational connections and interdependencies between states and societies increased, while Military force and power balancing are decreasing but remain essential. In coining the interdependence concept, Keohane and Nye also notably differentiated between interdependence and dependence in analyzing the role of power in politics and the relations between international actors.

From the analysis, complex interdependence is characterized by three characteristics, involving

1. The use of multiple channels of action between societies in interstate, transgovernmental, and transnational relations,
2. The absence of a hierarchy of issues with changing agendas and linkages between issues prioritized, and
3. The objective of bringing about a decline in military force and coercive power in international relations.

Thus, Keohane and Nye argue that the decline of military force as a policy tool and the increase in economic and other forms of interdependence should increase the probability of cooperation among states. The theorists' work surfaced in the 1970s to become a significant challenge to political realist theory in international politics.It became foundational to current theorists that it be categorized as liberalism (international relations), neoliberalism, and liberal institutionalism. Traditional critiques of liberalism often define alongside critiques of political realism. They both ignore the social nature of relations between states and the social fabric of international society. With the rise of neoliberal economics, debates, and the need to clarify international relations theory, Keohane has most recently described himself as merely an institutionalist. This theory's purpose is to develop sociological perspectives in contemporary International relations theory. Liberal, neoliberal, and liberal institutional theories continue to influence international politics and have become closely intertwined with political realism.

=== Multiple channels ===
Multiple channels that are present in complex interdependence are "connect societies, including informal ties between governmental elites as well as formal foreign office arrangements." The second type is "informal ties among nongovernmental elites where contact usually happens either face-to-face or through telecommunication. The last type is "Transnational organization," including organizations such as multinational banks or corporations. A more straightforward way of thinking of these concepts is by condensing them by calling them interstate, transgovernmental and transnational relations. Therefore, these channels can be a way of communication for states and are a considerable part of complex interdependence.

a. Interstate relations are thought to be "normal channels" by realists. It is also known as "horizontal dimensions of federalism."
b. Transgovernmental relations "applies when we relax the realist assumption that states act coherently as units." Crane Liberals believe that states can work together in order to enhance interdependence.
c. Transnational relations "applies when we relax the assumption that states are the only units." This take is more of the liberal perspective evident throughout international relations because of institutions' beliefs.

=== Absence of Hierarchy among Issues ===
Foreign affairs issues are becoming increasingly crucial regarding complex interdependence. Countries' policies are all interconnected, even if they are merely domestic. Though the policies may appear to address one countries' issues, any laws may have regional and global implications. These implications have encouraged consulting agreements among countries through liberal institutions like the IMF and the European Community. The presence of Anarchy allows for International Politics to align favorably with domestic issues and laws determined by developed, pluralistic domestic countries.

=== Minor Role of Military Force ===
Force has always been emphasized in international politics based upon the idea that (1) states compete for power, and that (2) survival is a state's chief goal under anarchy (security dilemma). However, military power and the role it has played has diminished for a few reasons. The first reason is because a state's fear of being attacked has declined (especially among industrialized, liberal states), because of the current lack of incentive among other countries to invade, as well as mutually beneficial relationships and cooperation (due to complex interdependence). With 20th century goals such as environmental and economic welfare, force is ineffective. The second reason is that we now see force used more as a deterrent (for example, Nuclear weapon). Goals that do relate to a state's security will most likely not use force to be achieved, and if used, could have steep consequences. This, as well as the domestic opposition that follows, are added reasons why states are hesitant to use force. One concern that stems from the diminishing role of military force is that Terrorism may be used more frequently, since most states are less likely to commit troops overseas.

The use of force, according to the author, will depend upon how much a state is affected by actions transpiring elsewhere. For example, if effects on that state are little, the chances of that state using force are also little. It will also depend on whether or not the issue is one of life or death. In this case, the realist theory would prevail and the state could very well end up taking forceful action. The author concludes that in each situation, we must decide which is more applicable, complex interdependence or realism.

=== Liberalism ===
The Liberal perspective encourages the use of institutions, like the International Monetary Fund and the World Bank, to encourage cooperation for similar goals. Liberalism theory expands to include neoliberalism and liberal institutionalism. Neoliberals believe that these institutions provide states with absolute gains from complex interdependence while neglecting the idea of power. Cooperation may be achieved through complex relationships among states, limited to the liberal lens. Such cooperation leads to a peaceful world order among states to provide peace from shared cooperation as long as there are mutual gains. Economic gains through trade and foreign investments negate any power struggles among states, addressed by liberal theorists. Extending the complex interdependence, especially economically, works to better stabilize peace among states. Acting outside the complex relationships in means of isolating domestic economies or wars would, in turn, destabilize peace among states, disrupting world order.

In the concept of weaponized interdependence (see section below), liberal scholars Keohane and Nye suggest that network asymmetries will decrease over time. They also believe that the global network gives way to cybersecurity benefits because of mutual drawbacks, as they focus on Mutualism (economic theory) and collaborative gains. However Henry Farrell and Abraham Newman argue that emerging asymmetrical nodes in the network conceal those collaborative links, as states take advantage of the nodes to fulfill their own self-interests. They came to the conclusion that liberal ideas about a globalized network do not correspond with the examples we have seen of states weaponizing interdependence (for example, SWIFT).

=== Realism ===
Complex interdependence has been labeled "the opposite of realism". The idea often pushes back against classical realist logic, such as the interdependent relationship between Canada and the United States. Neither country feels threatened by each other, given their relationship of shared values and goals. Realist logic would state that the vying of power would have both states always competing for security, but under complex interdependence logic, this is not the case. Keohane and Nye see complex interdependence as often a more accurate representation of reality than classical realism but claim that most situations fall in between the two ideal portraits.

Neorealism and classical realism are separate from complex interdependence but are considered relevant in appropriate situations. Complex interdependence does not apply universally. In third world states where states are trying to maximize their strengths and thus gain power, realism and neorealism remain prominent. Complex interdependence remains prevalent on the other side of the world, where nations are looking to create economic gains and push the conflict to the side. Though Keohane and Nye see complex interdependence as often more realistic than realism, they recognize that realism remains relevant in many current situations.

It is understood that traditional theories cannot explain global regime change when it relates to complex interdependence. One cannot use a realist perspective when explaining a situation born of complex interdependence.

== Political Economy of Complex Interdependence ==
The complex relationships promoted in complex interdependence can be observed in the International Political Economy. As Globalism matures, the political economies of the world grow interdependent. This perspective assumes that the global system is complex, that states' behavior in this system is rational, that global relationships continue to grow in relevance, and that the system of international political economy is not closed. All of this complexity surmises in the uncertain environment of international politics. States that partake in this system hold economic connections with other economies, promoting interdependence between participating states.

=== Economic Coercion ===
The emergence of complex interdependence has created dependency among states, as the liberal theorists described. Yet, the realist take on power can be displayed through the economic imbalance experienced among states to inflict their influence through complex interdependence. Such an example would include how China could use loans to fund a new port in Sri Lanka, knowing that Sri Lanka could not pay due to increasing debt. Later, China collected it for themselves. Through the complex relationships and needs of other states, states may use their own systematical advantage over the states that rely on them more.

Such complex interdependence can be seen as a negative and a positive among states. Often, states may use such relationships for the greater good of themselves or, at times, the greater good of the other. Economic Coercion through complex interdependence can allow the states to ensure a better world order for all states involved and humanity. Jeff D. Colgan discusses the example of Climate change reform emerging from economic ties. He considers how China's economic dependency on the United States creates fertile ground to instill climate change policies using a "climate change club" of the United States and the European Union. Any member not in this club would be subject to tariffs from member states, including China, if they don't join. The United States must then decide whether removing economic ties is valuable for them or if maintaining economic relations with China is of more significant value for all based on the complex interdependence. Such a move displays the ideas of realists in the complex interactions among states.

=== Weaponized interdependence ===
Globalization has shaped the global network in such a way that almost all states depend on it due to its interconnectedness. Farrell and Newman believe that because of this interconnectedness, and because states often compete for power, interdependence can be weaponized in order to gather valuable information, or to deny a state network access for strategic purposes. They also argue that this complex interdependence creates power asymmetries in the global network. This is based upon network theory, where networks are composed of nodes and ties (connections). Unlike Keohane and Nye, they believe that networks are the opposite of fragmented, and they instead produce lasting power inequality, where exchanges only go through a few chief nodes. The more connections a node has, the more influence it will have in the network. Because newer nodes will likely attach to more influential nodes, we end up seeing an unequal distribution as the networks grow, generating a “rich-get-richer effect”, leading to certain nodes becoming more utilized and central than others. Most chief nodes are focused on advanced industrial economies (for example, the U.S). The ability of a state to weaponize interdependence is dependent upon its institutions, the size of its economy, and how much autonomy the state has from that interconnectedness (whether or not it has asymmetrical interdependence). Asymmetrical interdependence allows that state to leverage network structure strategically without feeling the consequences.

They can do this through (1) the chokepoint and/or (2) the panopticon effect (the two forms of weaponized interdependence). In this context, panopticon means that states have information they can use to their advantage in order to predict their opponent's actions, sway negotiations, etc. Chokepoint means that a state is able to limit or prohibit use of a node (often a high degree node), so that another state(s)/private actor(s) cannot go through it. However, only states with the legal or physical jurisdiction over that node can utilize this form of weaponization. They also need strong, centralized legal and regulatory institutions. This can create tensions between states that have the ability to weaponize information, versus states that cannot. So even though the United States has both the legal and physical jurisdiction over chief nodes, its domestic institutions and norms limit certain actions it can take (for example, it cannot cut states out of the network). SWIFT, a U.S dominated network system, vital to the global payment system, is just one example of Farrell and Newman's theory in work. We see the chokepoint effect when the U.S (and European officials) locked Iran out of the global payment system because they felt it was assisting the regime and a contributor to its financial strength. An example of the panopticon effect was the U.S' use of SWIFT, shortly after 9/11, in order to gain information about international terrorism, its networks, and its financing. Despite initial criticism from the EU and the public, they later approved of the U.S’ actions and only required that the U.S share the information it gained. Therefore, just as the theory suggests, because SWIFT was a chief node in the global network system, certain states were able to weaponize it for strategic reasons.
