= High and low politics =

Concepts in political science

In political science (and in the discipline of international relations in particular), the concept high politics covers all matters that are vital to the very survival of the state: namely national and international security concerns. It is often used in opposition to low politics, which often designates economic, cultural, or social affairs.

== History ==
Although the idea of high politics has been present in all cultures and epochs, Thomas Hobbes was the first to enunciate that survival (of trade, the laws, societal order) hinges upon a finite number of ingredients; these ingredients were embodied and provided by the state. Interpreting Hobbes, these ingredients are what one can call "high politics".

The term "high politics" in itself was probably coined during the Cold War, given the stakes of an atomic war. The advent of the atomic bomb made it clear what was ultimately worth fighting for and what was not, hence, made clear what "high politics" meant. In that sense, the United States and the former Soviet Union would have gone to war for a direct atomic threat (Cuban Missile Crisis), but would have never gone to war over "low politics", a boycott of the 1980 Summer Olympics. Trade, for all its importance, is considered by most political scientists as "low politics", as it depends on specific security conditions to come into effect.

Low politics is a concept that covers all matters that are not absolutely vital to the survival of the state as the economics and the social affairs. The low politics are the domain of the state's welfare. It concerns all things about social or human security. Robert Keohane and Joseph Nye describe that previously, the international relations were based on a simple interdependence scheme based on national security (high politics); nowadays the international relations are ruled by a complex interdependence based on domestic issues: low politics.

The classical realist theory of international relations only considers the high politics as relevant and completely rejects the low politics. The complex interdependence of the liberal theory considers the low politics as fundamental without rejecting the high politics.

== Bibliography ==
- Keohane and Joseph S. Nye, Power and. Interdependence: World Politics in Transition (Boston: Little, Brown, 1977)
