= Marianne Marchand =

Dutch political scientist, researcher, feminist, and scholar

Marianne Helena Marchand is a political scientist, researcher, feminist, and scholar whose academic work focuses on the intersections of international relations, globalization, gender studies, and migration. Since the mid-1990s, she has published extensively in academic journals such as Third World Quarterly, Millennium: Journal of International Studies, and International Studies Quarterly, exploring critical and poststructuralist feminist perspectives on global restructuring, development, and transnational mobility. She is recognized for her contributions to feminist international relations theory and the study of gender and borders in global political economy.

== Career ==
=== Education ===
She earned a Bachelor of Arts in History and a Master’s degree in Contemporary and Economic History from Leiden University in the Netherlands. Additional coursework included minors in international public law, economics, and Spanish. Later, she completed a Ph.D. in Political Science with a focus on international relations at Arizona State University, followed by postgraduate studies in France, where she obtained a Diplôme d'Études Approfondies (DEA) in international relations.

=== Academic Positions ===
Throughout her career, Marchand has held academic and research appointments in several countries, including Canada, the United States, Germany, Denmark, Norway, Suriname, and Trinidad and Tobago. For over two decades, she served as a full-time professor at the Universidad de las Américas Puebla (UDLAP), where she also led the Canadian Studies and International Relations programs.

In 2020, she was named Associate Senior Fellow at the Käte Hamburger Kolleg / Centre for Global Cooperation Research at the University of Duisburg-Essen. Since 2023, she has been affiliated as a visiting professor with the Department of Political Science at Carleton University in Ottawa, Canada.

=== Research contributions ===
Her scholarly work integrates feminist theory with global political economy. Key areas of focus include gender and migration, border politics, and critical perspectives on development and regionalism. Marchand has led multiple international research projects supported by institutions such as Mexico’s National Council of Science and Technology (CONACYT), the European Union, and the governments of Canada and the Netherlands.

From 2007 to 2008, she served as Vice President of the International Studies Association (ISA), and in 2017, she received the Eminent Scholar Award from the ISA’s Feminist Theory and Gender Studies Section. She is also a Level III member of Mexico’s National System of Researchers (Sistema Nacional de Investigadores).

=== Notable works ===
Some of Marchand’s most widely cited works include Feminism/Postmodernism/Development, Different Communities/Different Realities/Different Encounters: A Reply to J. Ann Tickner, and Exploding the Canon. Her co-edited volume Gender and Global Restructuring: Sightings, Sites and Resistances is particularly recognized for its post-9/11 feminist critique of the global war on terror and its contribution to feminist international political economy.

== Selected publications ==
- (1995). Feminism/Postmodernism/Development. London: Routledge.
- (1995). "Latin American women speak on development: Are we listening yet?" In Feminism/Postmodernism/Development. London: Routledge.
- (1999). "The political economy of new regionalisms." Third World Quarterly, 20(5), 897–910.
- (1999). "The weave-world: Regionalisms in the South in the new millennium." Third World Quarterly, 20(5), 1061–1070.
- (2000). Gender and Global Restructuring: Sightings, Sites and Resistances. London: Routledge. Second edition, 2011.
- (2000). "Different communities/different realities/different encounters: A reply to J. Ann Tickner." International Studies Quarterly, 44(3), 441–446.
- (2001). "Exploding the canon." In Rethinking Empowerment: Gender and Development in a Global/Local World. Oxford University Press.
