= Postpositivism (international relations) =

Theories of international relations

In international relations theory, post-positivism refers to theories of international relations which epistemologically reject positivism, the idea that the empiricist observation of the natural sciences can be applied to the social sciences.

Post-positivist (or reflectivist) theories of IR attempt to integrate a larger variety of security concerns. Supporters argue that if IR is the study of foreign affairs and relations, it ought to include non-state actors as well as the state. Instead of studying solely high politics of the state, IR ought to study world politics of the everyday world—which involves both high and low politics. Thus, issues such as gender (often in terms of feminism which generally holds salient the subordination of women to men) and ethnicity (such as stateless actors like the Catalans or Rohingya people) can be problematized and made into an international security issue—supplementing (not replacing) the traditional IR concerns of diplomacy and outright war.

The post-positivist approach can be described as incredulity towards metanarratives—in IR, this would involve rejecting all-encompassing stories that claim to explain the international system. It argues that neither realism nor liberalism could be the full story. A post-positivist approach to IR does not claim to provide universal answers but seeks to ask questions instead. A key difference is that while positivist theories such as realism and liberalism highlight how power is exercised, post-positivist theories focus on how power is experienced resulting in a focus on both different subject matters and agents.

Often, post-positivist theories explicitly promote a normative approach to IR, by considering ethics. This is something which has often been ignored under traditional IR as positivist theories make a distinction between positive facts and normative judgement—whereas post-positivist argue that discourse is constitutive of reality; in other words, that it is impossible to be truly independent and factual as power-free knowledge cannot exist.

Postpositivist theories do not attempt to be scientific or a social science. Instead, they attempt in-depth analysis of cases in order to "understand" international political phenomena by asking relevant questions to determine in what ways the status-quo promote certain power relations. In 2009, 21 percent of international relations faculty characterized their scholarship as post-positivist.

== See also ==
- Critical international relations theory
- Postmodernism
