= International relations theory =

Study of international relations from a theoretical perspective

International relations theory is the study of international relations (IR) from a theoretical perspective. It seeks to explain behaviors and outcomes in international politics. The three most prominent schools of thought are realism, liberalism, and constructivism. Whereas realism and liberalism make broad and specific predictions about international relations, constructivism and rational choice are methodological approaches that focus on certain types of social explanation for phenomena.

International relations, as a discipline, is believed to have emerged after World War I with the establishment of a Chair of International Relations, the Woodrow Wilson Chair held by Alfred Eckhard Zimmern at the University of Wales, Aberystwyth. The modern study of international relations, as a theory, has sometimes been traced to realist works such as E. H. Carr's The Twenty Years' Crisis (1939) and Hans Morgenthau's Politics Among Nations (1948).

The most influential IR theory work of the post-World War II era was Kenneth Waltz's Theory of International Politics (1979), which pioneered neorealism. Neoliberalism (or liberal institutionalism) became a prominent competitive framework to neorealism, with prominent proponents such as Robert Keohane and Joseph Nye. During the late 1980s and 1990s, constructivism emerged as a prominent third IR theoretical framework, in addition to existing realist and liberal approaches. IR theorists such as Alexander Wendt, John Ruggie, Martha Finnemore, and Michael N. Barnett helped pioneer constructivism. Rational choice approaches to world politics became increasingly influential in the 1990s, in particular with works by James Fearon, such as the bargaining model of war; and Bruce Bueno de Mesquita, developer of expected utility and selectorate theory models of conflict and war initiation. There are also "post-positivist/reflectivist" IR theories (which stand in contrast to the aforementioned "positivist/rationalist" theories).

== Early history of the field ==
Early international relations scholarship in the interwar years focused on the need for the balance of power system to be replaced with a system of collective security. These thinkers were later described as "Idealists". The leading critique of this school of thinking was the "realist" analysis offered by Carr.

However, a more recent study, by David Long and Brian Schmidt in 2005, offers a revisionist account of the origins of the field of international relations. They claim that the history of the field can be traced back to late 19th century imperialism and internationalism. The fact that the history of the field is presented by "great debates", such as the realist-idealist debate, does not correspond with the historic evidence found in earlier works: "We should once and for all dispense with the outdated anachronistic artifice of the debate between the idealists and realists as the dominant framework for and understanding the history of the field". Their revisionist account claims that, up until 1918, international relations already existed in the form of colonial administration, race science, and race development.

== Realism ==
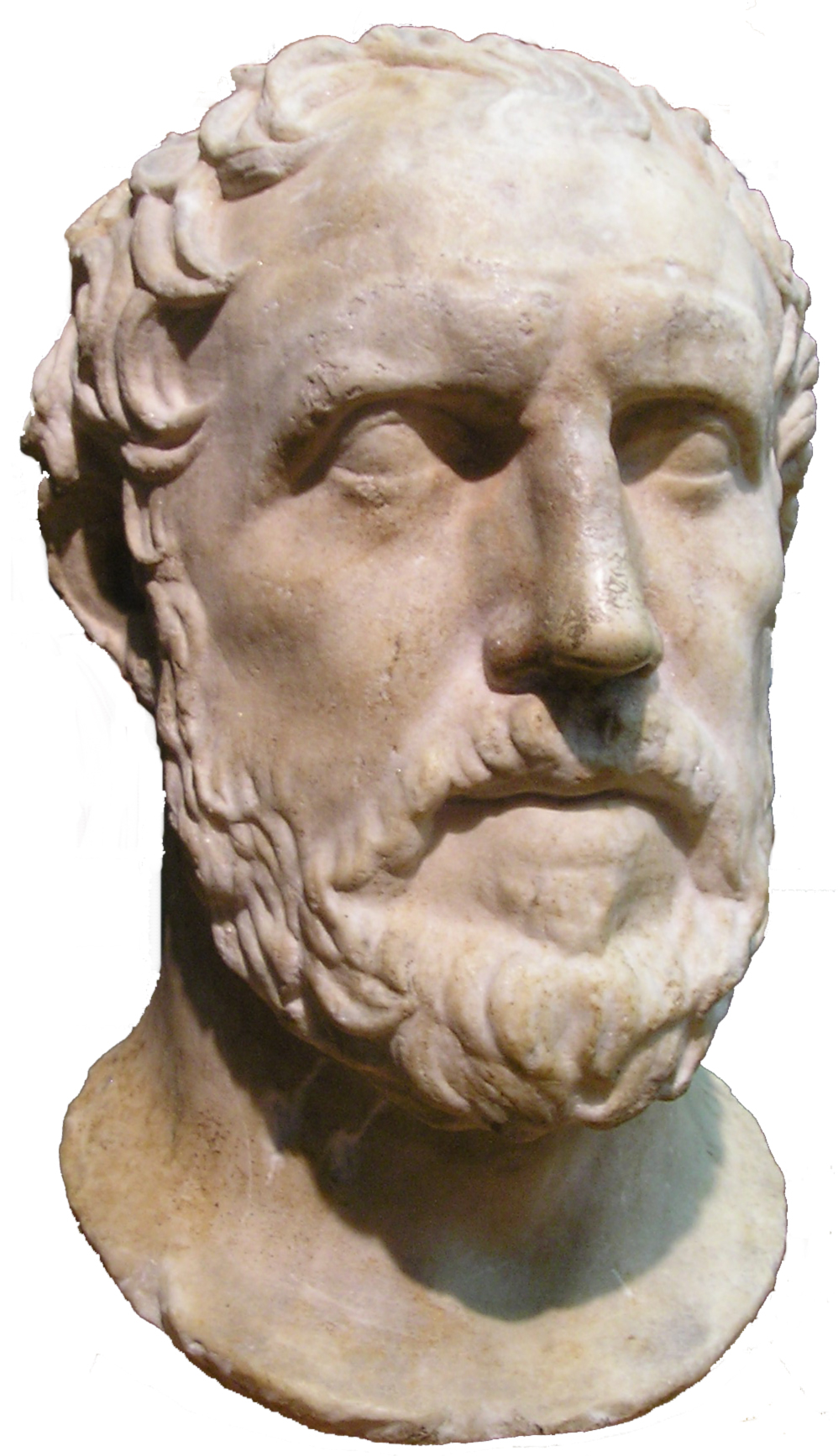
Thucydides, author of History of the Peloponnesian War, is considered one of the earliest "realist" thinkers.

Realism or political realism has been the dominant theory of international relations since the conception of the discipline. The theory claims to rely upon an ancient tradition of thought which includes writers such as Thucydides, Niccolò Machiavelli, and Thomas Hobbes. Early realism can be characterized as a reaction against interwar idealist thinking. The outbreak of World War II was seen by realists as evidence of the deficiencies of idealist thinking. There are various strands of modern-day realist thinking. However, the main tenets of the theory have been identified as statism, survival, and self-help.

- Statism: Realists believe that nation states are the main actors in international politics. As such it is a state-centric theory of international relations. This contrasts with liberal international relations theories which accommodate roles for non-state actors and international institutions. This difference is sometimes expressed by describing a realist world view as one which sees nation states as billiard balls, liberals would consider relationships between states to be more of a cobweb.
- Survival: Realists believe that the international system is governed by anarchy, meaning that there is no central authority. Therefore, international politics is a struggle for power between self-interested states.
- Self-help: Realists believe that no other states can be relied upon to help guarantee the state's survival.

Realism makes several key assumptions. It assumes that nation-states are unitary, geographically based actors in an anarchic international system with no authority above capable of regulating interactions between states as no true authoritative world government exists. Secondly, it assumes that sovereign states, rather than intergovernmental organizations, non-governmental organizations, or multinational corporations, are the primary actors in international affairs. Thus, states, as the highest order, are in competition with one another. As such, a state acts as a rational autonomous actor in pursuit of its own self-interest with a primary goal to maintain and ensure its own security—and thus its sovereignty and survival. Realism holds that in pursuit of their interests, states will attempt to amass resources, and that relations between states are determined by their relative levels of power. That level of power is in turn determined by the state's military, economic, and political capabilities.

Some realists, known as human nature realists or classical realists, believe that states are inherently aggressive, that territorial expansion is constrained only by opposing powers, while others, known as offensive/defensive realists, believe that states are obsessed with the security and continuation of the state's existence. The defensive view can lead to a security dilemma, where increasing one's own security can bring along greater instability as the opponent(s) builds up its own arms, making security a zero-sum game where only relative gains can be made.

=== Neorealism ===
Neorealism or structural realism is a development of realism advanced by Kenneth Waltz in Theory of International Politics. It is, however, only one strand of neorealism. Joseph Grieco has combined neo-realist thinking with more traditional realists. This strand of theory is sometimes called "modern realism".

Waltz's neorealism contends that the effect of structure must be taken into account in explaining state behavior. It shapes all foreign policy choices of states in the international arena. For instance, any disagreement between states derives from lack of a common power (central authority) to enforce rules and maintain them constantly. Thus, there is constant anarchy in the international system that makes it necessary for states to obtain strong weapons to guarantee their survival. Additionally, in an anarchic system, states with greater power have a tendency to increase their influence further. According to neo-realists, structure is considered an extremely important element in IR and is defined in a twofold manner as: 1) the ordering principle of the international system, which is anarchy, and 2) the distribution of capabilities across units. Waltz also challenges traditional realism's emphasis on traditional military power, instead characterizing power in terms of the combined capabilities of the state.

Waltz's version of neorealism has frequently been characterized as "defensive realism", whereas John Mearsheimer is a proponent of a different version of neorealism characterized as "offensive realism."

== Liberalism ==
The precursor to liberal international relations theory was "idealism". Idealism (or utopianism) was viewed critically by those who saw themselves as "realists", for instance E. H. Carr. In international relations, idealism (also called "Wilsonianism" because of its association with Woodrow Wilson) holds that a state should make its internal political philosophy the goal of its foreign policy. For example, an idealist might believe that ending poverty at home should be coupled with tackling poverty abroad. Wilson's idealism was a precursor to liberal international relations theory, which would arise amongst the "institution-builders" after World War I.

Liberalism holds that state preferences, rather than state capabilities, are the primary determinant of state behavior. Unlike realism, where the state is seen as a unitary actor, liberalism allows for plurality in state actions. Thus, preferences will vary from state to state, depending on factors such as culture, economic system or government type. Liberalism also holds that interaction between states is not limited to the political/security ("high politics"), but also economic/cultural ("low politics") whether through commercial firms, organizations or individuals. Thus, instead of an anarchic international system, there are plenty of opportunities for cooperation and broader notions of power, such as cultural capital (for example, the influence of films leading to the popularity of the country's culture and creating a market for its exports worldwide). Another assumption is that absolute gains can be made through co-operation and interdependence—thus peace can be achieved.

=== Neoliberalism ===
Neoliberalism, liberal institutionalism or neo-liberal institutionalism is a more recent branch of liberal international relations theory. Unlike traditional liberal theories of international politics, which focus on individual-level or domestic-level explanations, liberal institutionalism emphasizes the influence of systemic factors. Its proponents focus on the role of international institutions in allowing nations to successfully cooperate in an anarchic international system.

=== Complex interdependence ===
Robert O. Keohane and Joseph S. Nye, in response to neorealism, developed an opposing theory they dubbed "complex interdependence." They explain that "... complex interdependence sometimes comes closer to reality than does realism." In explaining this, they cover the three baseline assumptions in realist thought: first, states are coherent units and are the dominant actors in international relations; second, force is a usable and effective instrument of policy; and third, there is a hierarchy in international politics.

The heart of Keohane and Nye's argument is that, in international politics, there are, in fact, multiple channels that connect societies exceeding the conventional Westphalian system of states. This manifests itself in many forms ranging from informal governmental ties to multinational corporations and organizations. Here they define their terminology: interstate relations are those channels assumed by realists; transgovernmental relations occur when one relaxes the realist assumption that states act coherently as units; transnational applies when one removes the assumption that states are the only units. It is through these channels that political exchange occurs, not through the limited interstate channels that are the focus of realist theory.

Moreover, Keohane and Nye argue that there is not, in fact, a hierarchy among issues, meaning that not only is the martial arm of foreign policy not the supreme tool by which to carry out a state's agenda, but that there are a multitude of different agendas that come to the forefront. The line between domestic and foreign policy becomes blurred in this case, as realistically there is no clear agenda in interstate relations.

Finally, the use of military force is not exercised when complex interdependence prevails. In other words, for countries among which a complex interdependence exists, the role of the military in resolving disputes is negated. However, Keohane and Nye go on to state that the role of the military is in fact important with respect to an "alliance's political and military relations with a rival bloc."

=== Post-liberalism ===
One version of post-liberal theory argues that within the modern, globalized world, states in fact are driven to cooperate in order to ensure security and sovereign interests. The departure from classical liberal theory is most notably felt in the re-interpretation of the concepts of sovereignty and autonomy. Autonomy becomes a problematic concept in shifting away from a notion of freedom, self-determination, and agency to a heavily responsible and duty laden concept. Importantly, autonomy is linked to a capacity for good governance. Similarly, sovereignty also experiences a shift from a right to a duty. In the global economy, international organizations hold sovereign states to account, leading to a situation where sovereignty is co-produced among "sovereign" states. The concept becomes a variable capacity of good governance and can no longer be accepted as an absolute right. One possible way to interpret this theory, is the idea that in order to maintain global stability and security and solve the problem of the anarchic world system in International Relations, no overarching, global, sovereign authority is created. Instead, states collectively abandon some rights for full autonomy and sovereignty. Another version of post-liberalism, drawing on work in political philosophy after the end of the Cold War, as well as on democratic transitions in particular in Latin America, argues that social forces from below are essential in understanding the nature of the state and the international system. Without understanding their contribution to political order and its progressive possibilities, particularly in the area of peace in local and international frameworks, the weaknesses of the state, the failings of the liberal peace, and challenges to global governance cannot be realised or properly understood. Furthermore, the impact of social forces on political and economic power, structures, and institutions, provides some empirical evidence of the complex shifts currently underway in IR.

== Democratic ==
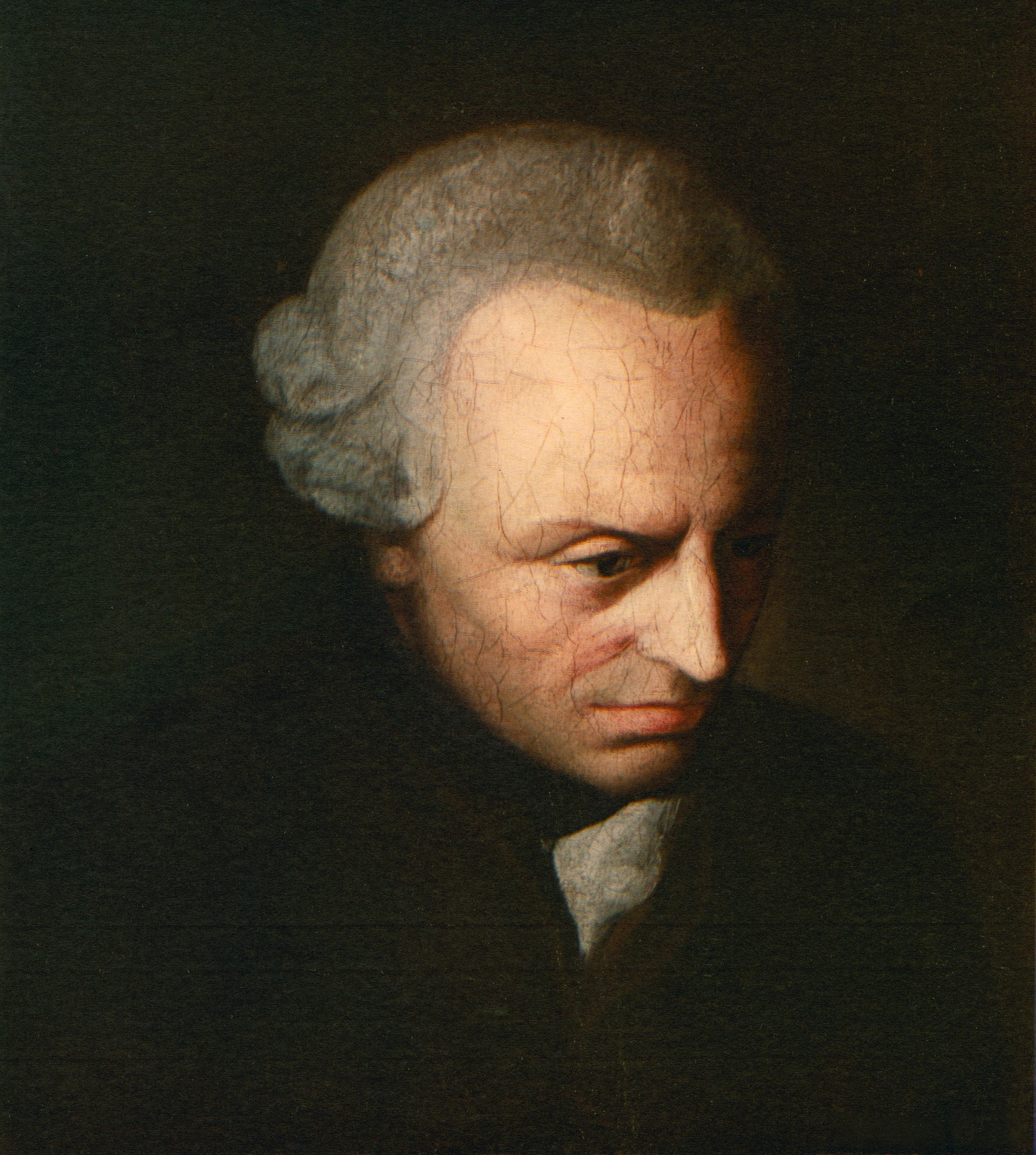
Kant's writings on perpetual peace were an early contribution to democratic peace theory.

The democratic peace theory and interactive model of democratic peace argue that democracies have fewer conflicts among themselves. This is seen as contradicting especially the realist theories and this empirical claim is now one of the great disputes in political science. Numerous explanations have been proposed for the democratic peace. Conflict resolution by nonviolent means tends to be preferred by the median citizens of different countries. It has also been argued, as in the book Never at War, that democracies conduct diplomacy in general very differently from non-democracies. (Neo)realists disagree with Liberals over the theory, often citing structural reasons for the peace, as opposed to the state's government. Sebastian Rosato, a critic of democratic peace theory, points to America's behavior towards left-leaning democracies in Latin America during the Cold War to challenge democratic peace. One argument is that economic interdependence makes war between trading partners less likely. In contrast, realists claim that economic interdependence increases rather than decreases the likelihood of conflict. While the democratic peace theory claims that democracy causes peace, the territorial peace theory claims that the direction of causality is opposite. In other words, peace leads to democracy. The latter theory is supported by the historical observation that peace almost always comes before democracy.

== Constructivism ==
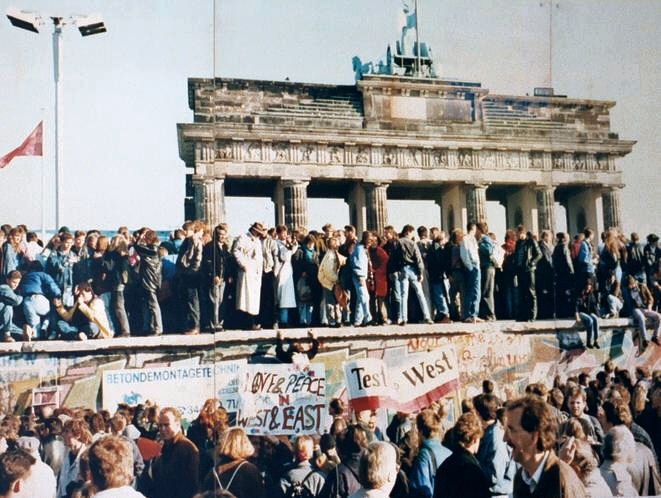
The standing of constructivism as an international relations theory increased after the fall of the Berlin Wall (pictured) and Communism in Eastern Europe as this was something not predicted by the existing mainstream theories.

Constructivism or social constructivism has been described as a challenge to the dominance of neo-liberal and neo-realist international relations theories. Michael Barnett describes constructivist international relations theories as being concerned with how ideas define international structure, how this structure defines the interests and identities of states and how states and non-state actors reproduce this structure. The key element of constructivism is the belief that "International politics is shaped by persuasive ideas, collective values, culture, and social identities." Constructivism argues that international reality is socially constructed by cognitive structures, which give meaning to the material world. Whereas rational choice approaches assume that actors follow a "logic of consequences", constructivist perspectives suggest that they adhere to a "logic of appropriateness". The theory emerged from debates concerning the scientific method of international relations theories and theories role in the production of international power. Emanuel Adler states that constructivism occupies a middle ground between rationalist and interpretative theories of international relations.

Constructivist theory criticises the static assumptions of traditional international relations theory and emphasizes that international relations is a social construction. Constructivism is critical of the ontological basis of rationalist theories of international relations. Whereas realism deals mainly with security and material power, and liberalism looks primarily at economic interdependence and domestic-level factors, constructivism concerns itself primarily with the role of ideas in shaping the international system; indeed it is possible that there is some overlap between constructivism and realism or liberalism, but they remain separate schools of thought. By "ideas" constructivists refer to the goals, threats, fears, identities, and other elements of perceived reality that influence states and non-state actors within the international system. Constructivists believe that these ideational factors can often have far-reaching effects, and that they can trump materialistic power concerns.

For example, constructivists note that an increase in the size of the U.S. military is likely to be viewed with much greater concern in Cuba, a traditional antagonist of the United States, than in Canada, a close U.S. ally. Therefore, there must be perceptions at work in shaping international outcomes. As such, constructivists do not see anarchy as the invariable foundation of the international system, but rather argue, in the words of Alexander Wendt, that "anarchy is what states make of it". Constructivists also believe that social norms shape and change foreign policy over time rather than security which realists cite.

== Marxism ==
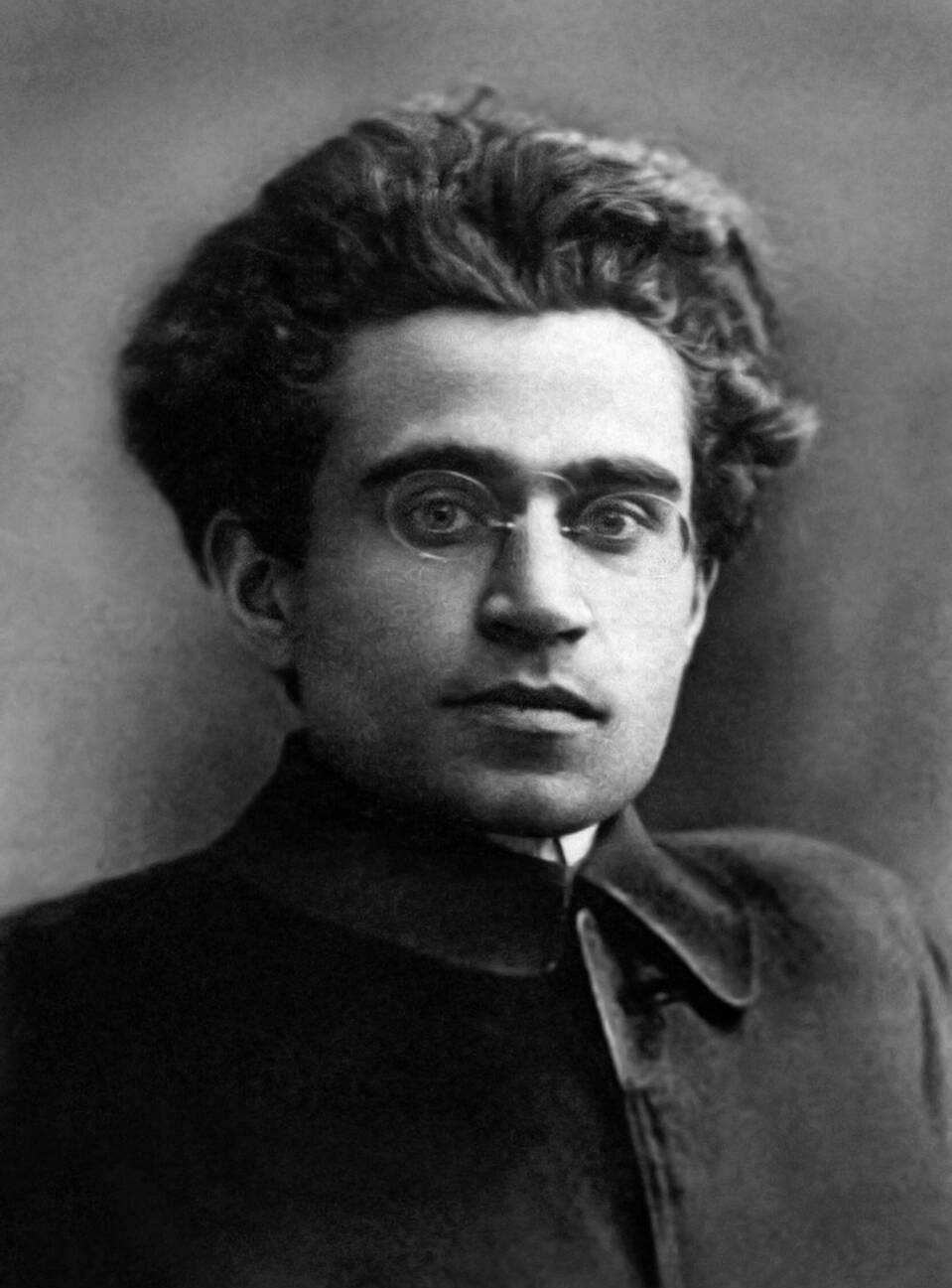
Antonio Gramsci's writings on the hegemony of capitalism have inspired Marxist international relations scholarship.

Marxist and Neo-Marxist international relations theories are structuralist paradigms which reject the realist/liberal view of state conflict or cooperation; instead focusing on the economic and material aspects. Marxist approaches argue the position of historical materialism and make the assumption that the economic concerns transcend others; allowing for the elevation of class as the focus of study. Marxists view the international system as an integrated capitalist system in pursuit of capital accumulation. A sub-discipline of Marxist IR is Critical Security Studies. Gramscian approaches rely on the ideas of Italian Antonio Gramsci whose writings concerned the hegemony that capitalism holds as an ideology. Marxist approaches have also inspired Critical Theorists such as Robert W. Cox who argues that "Theory is always for someone and for some purpose".

One notable Marxist approach to international relations theory is Immanuel Wallerstein's World-system theory which can be traced back to the ideas expressed by Lenin in Imperialism: The Highest Stage of Capitalism. World-system theory argues that globalized capitalism has created a core of modern industrialized countries which exploit a periphery of exploited "Third World" countries. These ideas were developed by the Latin American Dependency School. "Neo-Marxist" or "New Marxist" approaches have returned to the writings of Karl Marx for their inspiration. Key "New Marxists" include Justin Rosenberg and Benno Teschke. Marxist approaches have enjoyed a renaissance since the collapse of communism in Eastern Europe.

Criticisms of Marxists approaches to international relations theory include the narrow focus on material and economic aspects of life, as well as assuming that the interests pursued by actors are derived from class.

== English school ==
The "English school" of international relations theory, also known as international society, liberal realism, rationalism or the British institutionalists, maintains that there is a "society of states" at the international level, despite the condition of "anarchy", i.e., the lack of a ruler or world state. Despite being called the English school, many of the academics from this school were neither English nor from the United Kingdom.

A great deal of the work of the English school concerns the examination of traditions of past international theory, casting it, as Martin Wight did in his 1950s-era lectures at the London School of Economics, into three divisions:

- Realist (or Hobbesian, after Thomas Hobbes), which views states as independent competing units
- Rationalist (or Grotian, after Hugo Grotius), which looks at how states can work together and cooperate for mutual benefit
- Revolutionist (or Kantian, after Immanuel Kant), which looks at human society as transcending borders or national identities

In broad terms, the English school itself has supported the rationalist or Grotian tradition, seeking a middle way (or via media) between the power politics of realism and the "utopianism" of revolutionism. The English school rejects behavioralist approaches to international relations theory.

One way to think about the English school is that, while some theories identify with just one of the three historical traditions (classical realism and neorealism owe a debt to the realist or Hobbesian tradition; Marxism to the revolutionist tradition, for example), English school looks to combine all of them. While there is great diversity within the 'school', much of it involves either examining when and how the different traditions combine or dominate, or focusing on the rationalist tradition, especially the concept of international society (which is the concept most associated with English school thinking). The English school maintains that "the most distinguished theories of international politics can be divided into three basic categories: realism, which emphasises the concept of 'international anarchy'; revolutionism, which concentrates on the aspect of the 'moral unity' of the international society, and rationalism, which is based on the aspect of 'international dialogue and intercourse." Therefore, the English school highlights the assiduous interaction between the main strands of IR theory in the understanding of interstate relations.

In Hedley Bull's The Anarchical Society, a seminal work of the school, he begins by looking at the concept of order, arguing that states across time and space have come together to overcome some of the danger and uncertainty of the Hobbesian international system to create an international society of states that share certain interests and ways of thinking about the world. By doing so, they make the world more ordered, and can eventually change international relations to become significantly more peaceful and beneficial to their shared interests.

== Functionalism ==
Functionalism is a theory of international relations that arose principally from the experience of European integration. Rather than the self-interest that realists see as a motivating factor, functionalists focus on common interests shared by states. Integration develops its own internal dynamic: as states integrate in limited functional or technical areas, they increasingly find that momentum for further rounds of integration in related areas. This "invisible hand" of integration phenomenon is termed "spillover". Although integration can be resisted, it becomes harder to stop integration's reach as it progresses. This usage, and the usage in functionalism in international relations, is the less common meaning of functionalism.

More commonly, however, functionalism is an argument that explains phenomena as functions of a system rather than an actor or actors. Immanuel Wallerstein employed a functionalist theory when he argued that the Westphalian international political system arose to secure and protect the developing international capitalist system. His theory is called "functionalist" because it says that an event was a function of the preferences of a system and not the preferences of an agent. Functionalism is different from structural or realist arguments in that while both look to broader, structural causes, realists (and structuralists more broadly) say that the structure gives incentives to agents, while functionalists attribute causal power to the system itself, bypassing agents entirely.

== Post-structuralism ==
Post-structuralism differs from most other approaches to international politics because it does not see itself as a theory, school or paradigm which produces a single account of the subject matter. Instead, post-structuralism is an approach, attitude, or ethos that pursues critique in particular way. Post-structuralism sees critique as an inherently positive exercise that establishes the conditions of possibility for pursuing alternatives. It states that "Every understanding of international politics depends upon abstraction, representation and interpretation". Scholars associated with post-structuralism in international relations include Richard K. Ashley, James Der Derian, Michael J. Shapiro, R. B. J. Walker, and Lene Hansen.

== Post-modernism ==
Post-modernist approaches to international relations are critical of metanarratives and denounces traditional IR's claims to truth and neutrality.

== Postcolonialism ==
Postcolonial international relations scholarship posits a critical theory approach to international relations (IR), and is a non-mainstream area of international relations scholarship. Postcolonialism focuses on the persistence of colonial forms of power and the continuing existence of racism in world politics.

== Feminist international relations theory ==
Feminist international relations theory applies a gender perspective to topics and themes in international relations such as war, peace, security, and trade. In particular, feminist international relations scholars use gender to analyze how power exists within different international political systems. Historically, feminist international relations theorists have struggled to find a place within international relations theory, either having their work ignored or discredited. Feminist international relations also analyzes how the social and the political interact, often pointing to the ways in which international relations affect individuals and vice versa. Generally, feminist international relations scholars tend to be critical of the realist school of thought for their strong positivist and state-centered approach to international relations, although feminist international scholars who are also realists exist. Feminist International Relations borrows from a number of methodologies and theories such as post-positivism, constructivism, postmodernism, and postcolonialism.

Jean Bethke Elshtain is a key contributor to feminist international relations theory. In her seminal book, Women and War, Elshtain criticizes gender roles inherent in mainstream international relations theory. Particularly, Elshtain decries international relations for perpetuating a tradition of armed civic culture that automatically excludes women/wives. Instead, Elshatin challenges the trope of women as solely passive peacekeepers, using drawing parallels between wartime experiences and her personal experiences from her childhood and later as a mother. Thus, Elshtain has been lauded by some feminist international relations theorists as one of the first theorists to blend personal experience with international relations, thus challenging international relation's traditional preference for positivism.

Cynthia Enloe is another influential scholar in the field of feminist international relations. Her influential feminist international relations text, Bananas, Beaches, and Bases, considers where women fit into the international political system. Similar to Jean Bethke Elshtain, Enloe looks at how the everyday lives of women are influenced by international relations. For example, Enloe uses banana plantations to illustrate how different women are affected by international politics depending on their geographical location, race, or ethnicity. Women, Enloe argues, play a role in international relations whether this work is recognized or not, working as labourers, wives, sex workers, and mothers, sometimes within army bases.

J. Ann Tickner is a prominent feminist international relations theorist with many notable written pieces. For example, her piece "You Just Don't Understand: Troubled Engagements Between Feminists and IR Theorists" examines the misunderstandings that occur between feminist scholars and international relations theorists. Specifically, Tickner argues that feminist international relations theory sometimes works outside of traditional ontological and epistemological international relations structures, instead analyzing international relations from a more humanistic perspective. Thus, Tickner was critical of the ways in which the study of international relations itself excludes women from participating in international relations theorizing. This piece of Tickner's was met with criticism from multiple scholars, such as Robert Keohane, who wrote "Beyond Dichotomy: Conversations Between International Relations and Feminist Theory" and Marianne Marchand, who criticized Tickner's assumption that feminist international relations scholars worked in the same ontological reality and epistemological tradition in her piece "Different Communities/Different Realities/Different Encounters".

== Psychological approaches to international relations ==
Psychological approaches to international relations focus on the impact of cognition and emotion on world politics. Through the analysis of political decision making, scholars have examined a broad spectrum of issues ranging from nuclear strategy and nuclear proliferation to deterrence, reassurance, signaling, and bargaining, as well as conflict management and conflict resolution.

In the 1970s, scholars of world politics started drawing on new research in cognitive psychology to explain decisions to cooperate or compete in international relations. Cognitive psychology had assigned cognition a central role in the explanation of human decision-making. It found that people's behavior often deviates from the expectations of the traditional rational choice model. To explain these deviations, cognitive psychologists developed several concepts and theories. These include theories of misperception, the importance of beliefs and schemas in information processing, and the use of analogies and heuristics in interpreting information, among others.

Scholars of international relations took up these insights and applied them to issues in world politics. For example, Robert Jervis identified patterns of leaders' misperception in historical cases that led to unwanted escalation, failures of deterrence, and the outbreak of war. Deborah Welch Larson and Rose McDermott have referred to belief systems and schemas as central drivers of information processing and foreign policy decision-making. Keren Yarhi-Milo has investigated how policy-makers rely on cognitive shortcuts called "heuristics" when they assess the intentions of their adversaries.

In addition to cognitive psychology, social psychology and psychoanalysis have long inspired research in international relations. Both have identified a fundamental human need for identity – the way in which a person or a group is, or wishes to be known by others. The resulting identity formation dynamics can contribute to conflicts between and among groups. Scholars of international relations have drawn on insights in social psychology and psychoanalysis to explore the dynamics of conflict among and between groups and states as well as processes of conflict management and resolution.

More recently, scholars of international relations have started drawing on emotion research in psychology to shed light on issues in world politics. Research in psychology suggests that affect and emotions are core drivers in decision making and behavior. This has implications for the study of foreign policy, escalation to war, conflict resolution, and other issues in world politics. In this context, C. Nicolai N. L. Gellwitzki and Anne-Marie Houde have introduced the term Gefühlspolitik to describe how international relations are shaped by, and appeal to, emotions. The term Gefühlspolitik draws on the German words Gefühl (“feeling”) and Politik (“politics”), and is positioned as a conceptual counterpoint to Realpolitik, a term associated with Otto von Bismarck, who reportedly warned against Gefühlspolitik as unpredictable and likely to undermine strategic calculation, state interest, and disciplined diplomacy. Numerous scholars have applied emotion-based approaches to empirical research. Rose McDermott and Jonathan Mercer argue that affective experience can have adaptive functions by facilitating quick and effective decision-making. Thomas Dolan has drawn on affective intelligence theory to show that some emotional responses leaders may have to new events during wartime, such as joy or anxiety, tend to bring about change in their approaches to war, while others, like contentment or frustration, are prone to produce resistance to change. Combining insights from experimental psychology and the sociology of emotions, Robin Markwica has developed "emotional choice theory" as an alternative model to rational choice theory and constructivist perspectives.

Evolutionary perspectives, such as from evolutionary psychology, have been argued to help explain many features of international relations. Humans in the ancestral environment did not live in states and likely rarely had interactions with groups outside of a very local area. However, a variety of evolved psychological mechanisms, in particular those for dealing with inter group interactions, are argued to influence current international relations. These include evolved mechanisms for social exchange, cheating and detecting cheating, status conflicts, leadership, ingroup and outgroup distinction and biases, coalitions, and violence.

== Theory in international relations scholarship ==
In a 1955 article, Kenneth W. Thompson characterized IR theory as a recent phenomenon in political science scholarship. Thompson distinguished between "normative" IR theory, "general" IR theory, and IR theory as the "basis of action."

In recent years, several IR scholars have remarked on what they see as a trend away from IR theory in IR scholarship. The September 2013 issue of European Journal of International Relations and the June 2015 issue of Perspectives on Politics debated the state of IR theory. A 2016 study showed that while theoretical innovations and qualitative analyses are a large part of graduate training, journals favor middle-range theory, quantitative hypothesis testing and methodology for publishing.

== Alternative approaches ==
Several alternative approaches have been developed based on foundationalism, anti-foundationalism, behaviouralism, structuralism, and post-structuralism.

Behavioural international relations theory is an approach to international relations theory which believes in the idea that the social sciences can adapt methodologies from the natural sciences. Accordingly, behavioural scholars reject isms (ideological approaches) because their adherents believe the maxims of their isms are self-evidently true. Instead of testing maxims systematically to determine whether they are true, behaviouralists view proponents of ideological isms as spreading propaganda in the guise of scholarship to guide policy-makers.

The latest formulation of the behavioural approach involves macro-theories or paradigms. That is, theories that can be applied at several levels of analysis. Theories previously developed in economics and sociology are applied to international affairs, while the major isms, such as realism, are reconstituted into a form that can be tested systematically with comprehensive databases. The major international relations paradigms are identified as the Marxian (not ideological Marxism), mass society, community building, and rational actor paradigms, each of which are homes to alternative variants. Behavioural scholars seek to retrofit isms identified above into variants of existing paradigms that can be tested empirically, whereupon the future of international relations theory will move beyond untested maxims to a solid foundation of knowledge.

== See also ==
- Diplomatic history
- Foreign policy
- International legal theories
- List of international relations journals
- Philosophy of war
