= Liberal institutionalism =

International relations theory

Liberal institutionalism (or institutional liberalism or neoliberalism) is a theory of international relations that holds that international cooperation between states is feasible and sustainable, and that such cooperation can reduce conflict and competition. Neoliberalism is a revised version of liberalism. Alongside neorealism, liberal institutionalism is one of the two most influential contemporary approaches to international relations.

In contrast to neorealist scholarship (which is skeptical of prospects for sustainable cooperation), liberal institutionalism argues that cooperation is feasible and sustainable. Liberal institutionalists highlight the role of international institutions and regimes in facilitating cooperation between states. Robert Keohane's 1984 book After Hegemony used insights from the new institutional economics to argue that the international system could remain stable in the absence of a hegemon, thus rebutting hegemonic stability theory.

Keohane showed that international cooperation could be sustained through repeated interactions, transparency, and monitoring. According to Keohane and other liberal institutionalists, institutions facilitate cooperation by:

- Reducing transaction costs
- Providing information
- Making commitments more credible
- Establishing focal points for coordination
- Facilitating the principle of reciprocity
- Extending the shadow of the future
- Enabling interlinkages of issues, which raises the cost of noncompliance

== Terminology ==
Some call the school of thought rational functionalism instead of liberal institutionalism. Liberal institutionalism is also close to—but not synonymous with—regime theory and neoliberalism. Robert Keohane, a political scientist largely responsible for the development of liberal institutionalism, considers his ideas part of institutionalism or rational institutionalism, even though those schools disagree with him on certain points. Keohane dislikes using the adjectives "liberal" or "neoliberal" to describe his work because he also draws from realism, a school of thought that is often contrasted with liberalism. Other major influences are the hegemonic stability theory of Stephen Krasner and the work of Charles P. Kindleberger, among others.

Liberal institutionalism differs from other common international relations theories like realism in the fact that it does not ignore internal politics. Furthermore, institutional liberalism follows the idea that democracy and capitalism create systems which not only maintain peace but also create beneficial economic opportunities for those involved. Liberal institutionalists believe that democracies naturally lead to peace because the many govern and not the few, and therefore those who decide to go to war will be the many that serve. This is in stark contrast to monarchies and dictatorships that are more warlike due to the fact that the few that do not serve will go to war. Beyond that liberal institutionalists defend capitalism on an international scale because they believe that if two nations are friendly, democratic, and capitalist the two nations will inevitably negotiate mutually beneficial trade deals.

== Role of institutions ==
According to liberal institutionalists, institutions facilitate cooperation by:

- Reducing transaction costs
- Providing information
- Making commitments more credible
- Establishing focal points for coordination
- Facilitating the principle of reciprocity
- Extending the shadow of the future
- Enabling interlinkages of issues, which raises the cost of noncompliance

Critics of liberal institutionalism argue that institutions do not overcome power politics; rather, institutions reflect power politics. Realist Joseph Grieco argues that liberal institutionalist analyses omit that states pursue relative gains (rather than absolute gains), and that institutionalist analyses that focus on the issue of "cheating" ignore that the relative gains problem is key to why realists believe international cooperation fails. Critics also argue that it is unclear whether institutions have an independent effect on cooperation or whether they reflect that the members are already willing to cooperate and comply. Other critics argue that liberal institutionalists underestimate the enforcement powers of institutions: institutions are often designed to be weak to attract more members, and they tend to be particularly weak on issues related to security rather than economy.

Using logics from historical institutionalism, John Ikenberry argues that institutions may be highly durable because:

- They strengthen expectations about future behavior
- They build coalitions, routines and connections between actors, which creates incentives for continuity
- They lead to spillovers, as other forms of cooperation builds around the existing institutions
- High start-up costs prevent actors from setting up challenger institutions
- Learning effects create incentives for actors to stick with existing institutions.

== Contentions ==
=== Keohane and Nye ===
Robert O. Keohane and Joseph S. Nye, in response to neorealism, develop an opposing theory they dub "Complex interdependence." Robert Keohane and Joseph Nye explain, "... complex interdependence sometimes comes closer to reality than does realism." In explaining this, Keohane and Nye cover the three assumptions in realist thought: First, states are coherent units and are the dominant actors in international relations; second, force is a usable and effective instrument of policy; and finally, the assumption that there is a hierarchy in international politics.

The heart of Keohane and Nye's argument is that in international politics there are, in fact, multiple channels that connect societies exceeding the conventional Westphalian system of states. This manifests itself in many forms ranging from informal governmental ties to multinational corporations and organizations. Here they define their terminology; interstate relations are those channels assumed by realists; transgovernmental relations occur when one relaxes the realist assumption that states act coherently as units; transnational applies when one removes the assumption that states are the only units. It is through these channels that political exchange occurs, not through the limited interstate channel as championed by realists.

Secondly, Keohane and Nye argue that there is not, in fact, a hierarchy among issues, meaning that not only is the martial arm of foreign policy not the supreme tool by which to carry out a state's agenda, but that there is a multitude of different agendas that come to the forefront. The line between domestic and foreign policy becomes blurred in this case, as realistically there is no clear agenda in interstate relations.

Finally, the use of military force is not exercised when complex interdependence prevails. The idea is developed that between countries in which a complex interdependence exists, the role of the military in resolving disputes is negated. However, Keohane and Nye go on to state that the role of the military is in fact important in that "alliance's political and military relations with a rival bloc."

=== Lebow ===
Richard Ned Lebow states that the failure of neorealism lies in its "institutionalist" ontology, whereas the neorealist thinker Kenneth Waltz states, "the creators [of the system] become the creatures of the market that their activity gave rise to." This critical failure, according to Lebow, is due to the realists' inability "to escape from the predicament of anarchy." Or rather, the assumption that states do not adapt and will respond similarly to similar constraints and opportunities.

=== Mearsheimer ===
Norman Angell, a classical London School of Economics liberal, had held: "We cannot ensure the stability of the present system by the political or military preponderance of our nation or alliance by imposing its will on a rival."

Keohane and Lisa L. Martin expound upon these ideas in the mid 1990s as a response to John J. Mearsheimer's "The False Promise of International Institutions", where Mearsheimer purports that, "institutions cannot get states to stop behaving as short-term power maximizers." In fact Mearsheimer's article is a direct response to the liberal-institutionalist movement created in response to neo-realism. The central point in Keohane and Martin's idea is that neo-realism insists that, "institutions have only marginal effects ... [which] leaves [neo-realism] without a plausible account of the investments that states have made in such international institutions as the EU, NATO, GATT, and regional trading organizations." This idea is in keeping with the notion of complex interdependence. Moreover, Keohane and Martin argue that the fact that international institutions are created in response to state interests, that the real empirical question is "knowing how to distinguish the effects of underlying conditions from those of the institutions themselves." The debate between the institutionalists and Mearsheimer is about whether institutions have an independent effect on state behavior, or whether they reflect great power interests that said powers employ to advance their respective interests.

Mearsheimer is concerned with 'inner-directed' institutions, which he states, "seek to cause peace by influencing the behavior of the member states." In doing so he dismisses Keohane and Martin's NATO argument in favor of the example of the European Community and the International Energy Agency. According to Mearsheimer, NATO is an alliance that is interested in "an outside state, or coalition of states, which the alliance aims to deter, coerce, or defeat in war." Mearsheimer reasons that since NATO is an alliance it has special concerns. He concedes this point to Keohane and Martin. However, Mearsheimer reasons, "to the extent that alliances cause peace, they do so by deterrence, which is straightforward realist behavior." In essence, Mearsheimer believes that Keohane and Martin "are shifting the terms of the debate, and making realist claims under the guise of institutionalism.

Mearsheimer criticizes Martin's argument that the European Community (EC) enhances the prospects of cooperation, particularly in the case of Great Britain's sanctioning of Argentina during the Falklands War, where it was able to secure the cooperation of other European states by linking the issues at hand to the EC. Mearsheimer purports that the United States was not a member of the EC and yet the US and Britain managed to cooperate on sanctions, creating an ad hoc alliance which effected change. "... Issue linkage was a commonplace practice in world politics well before institutions came on the scene; moreover, Britain and other European states could have used other diplomatic tactics to solve the problem. After all, Britain and America managed to cooperate on sanctions even though the United States was not a member of the EC."

== See also ==
- European integration
- Foreign interventionism
- Liberal internationalism
- Liberal international order
- Multilateralism
- Liberal international relations theory
- Marxist international relations theory
- Neoconservatism
- Neorealism
- New Left
