= Liberalism (international relations) =

School of thought within international relations theory

Liberalism is a school of thought within international relations theory which revolves around three interrelated principles:

- Rejection of power politics as the only possible outcome of international relations; it questions security/warfare principles of realism;
- Mutual benefits and international cooperation; and
- The role of international organizations and non-governmental actors in shaping state preferences and policy choices.

This school of thought emphasizes three factors that encourage more cooperation and less conflict among states:

- International institutions, such as the United Nations, which provide a forum to resolve disputes in non-violent ways;
- International trade because, when countries' economies are interconnected through trade, they are less likely to go to war with each other; and
- Spread of democracy, as well-established democracies are assumed to not go to war with one another, so if there are more democracies, interstate war will be less frequent.

Liberals believe that international institutions play a key role in cooperation among states via interdependence. There are three main components of interdependence. States interact in various ways, through economic, financial, and cultural means; security tends to not be the primary goal in state-to-state interactions; and military forces are not typically used. Liberals also argue that international diplomacy can be a very effective way to get states to interact with each other honestly and support nonviolent solutions to problems. With the proper institutions and diplomacy, Liberals believe that states can work together to maximize prosperity and minimize conflict.

Liberalism is one of the main schools of international relations theory. Liberalism comes from the Latin liber meaning "free", referring originally to the philosophy of freedom. Its roots lie in the broader liberal thought originating in the Enlightenment. The central issues that it seeks to address are the problems of achieving lasting peace and cooperation in international relations, and the various methods that could contribute to their achievement.

Supporters of liberalism often believe in the spreading of democracy through cooperation.

== Areas of study ==
Broad areas of study within liberal international relations theory include:

- Democratic peace theory, and, more broadly, the effect of domestic political regime types and domestic politics on international relations.
- Commercial peace theory, arguing that free trade has pacifying effects on international relations. Current explorations of globalization and interdependence are a broader continuation of this line of inquiry.
- Institutional peace theory, which attempts to demonstrate how cooperation can be sustained in anarchy, how long-term interests can be pursued over short-term interests, and how actors may realize absolute gains instead of seeking relative gains.
- Related, the effect of international organizations on international politics, both in their role as forums for states to pursue their interests, and in their role as actors in their own right.
- The role of international law in moderating or constraining state behavior.
- The effects of liberal norms on international politics, especially relations between liberal states.
- The role of various types of unions in international politics (relations), such as highly institutionalized alliances (e.g. NATO), confederations, leagues, federations, and evolving entities like the European Union.
- The role, or potential role, of cosmopolitanism in transcending the state and affecting international relations.

== History ==
=== Early beginnings ===
Liberalism originally arose from both deep scholarly and philosophical roots. With the theory's prime principle being international cooperation and peace, early influences are seen in some bigger religious practices sharing the same goal. It was later in the 17th and 18th centuries in which political liberalism began to take a form that challenged nobility and inherited inequality. Followed shortly after was the Enlightenment where liberal ideals began to develop with works by philosophers such as Voltaire, Locke, Smith, and German thinker Immanuel Kant. In part, liberal scholars were influenced by the Thirty Years' War and the Enlightenment. The length and disastrous effects of the Thirty Years' War caused a common disdain for warfare throughout much of Europe. Thinkers, like Locke and Kant, wrote about what they saw in the world around them. They believed that war is fundamentally unpopular and that man is born with certain rights because the end of the Thirty Years' War proved these ideas to them.

John Locke discusses many ideas that are now attributed to Liberalism in Two Treatises of Government, published in 1689. In his second treatise, Locke comments on society and outlines the importance of natural rights and laws. Locke believes that people are born as blank slates without any preordained ideas or notions. This state is known as the State of Nature because it shows people in their most barbaric form. As people grow, their experiences begin to shape their thoughts and actions. They are naturally in the State of Nature until they choose not to be, until something changes their barbaric nature. Locke says that, civil government can remedy this anarchy. When it comes to the Law of Nature, people are more likely to act rationally when there is a government in place because there are laws and consequences to abide by. Locke argues that civil government can help people gain the basic human rights of health, liberty and possession. Governments that grant these rights and enforce laws benefit the world. Many of these ideas have influenced leaders such as the Founding Fathers during the American Revolution and French revolutionaries during the French Revolution.

In Kant's To Perpetual Peace, the philosopher set the way by forming guidelines to create a peace program to be applied by nations. This program would require cooperation between states as well as the mutual pursuit of secure freedom and shared benefits. One such idea was the Democratic Peace Theory. In To Perpetual Peace, Kant put forth the idea that democracies do not fight wars because leaders were too worried about re-election. Because war was naturally unpopular, Kant thought that leaders would avoid burdening voters with its costs. After seeing success in intertwining states through economic coalition, liberal supporters began to believe that warfare was not always an inevitable part of international relations. Support of liberal political theory continued to grow from there.

=== Neoliberalism ===
Kant's democratic peace theory has since been revised by neoliberals like Robert Keohane and Joseph Nye. These theorists have seen that democracies do in fact fight wars. However, democracies do not fight wars with other democracies because of capitalist ties. Democracies are economically dependent and therefore are more likely to resolve issues diplomatically. Furthermore, citizens in democracies are less likely to think of citizens in other democracies as enemies because of shared morals. Kant's original ideas have influenced liberal scholars and have had a large impact on liberal thought.

== See also ==
- Commercial liberalism
- Idealism in international relations
- Liberal international order
