= Richard K. Ashley =

Professor of international relations

- Known for: Postmodernist international relations
- Title: Associate professor
- Awards: Karl Deutsch Award (1985)

Academic background
- Education: PhD
- Alma mater: MIT
- Thesis: Growth, Rivalry, and Balance (1976)
- Doctoral advisor: Nazli Choucri
- Influences: Alker, Derrida, Foucault, Habermas, Spivak

Academic work
- Discipline: International relations
- Institutions: School of Politics and Global Studies, Arizona State
- Doctoral students: Nevzat Soguk
- Main interests: International relations theory
- Notable works: "The Poverty of Neorealism" (1984); "Untying the Sovereign State" (1988); "Living on Border Lines" (1989)
- Website: pgs.clas.asu.edu/content/richard-ashley-1

Richard K. Ashley is a postmodernist scholar of International relations. He is an associate professor at the Arizona State University's School of Politics and Global Studies.

Ashley studied at the University of California, Santa Barbara and at Massachusetts Institute of Technology (MIT). He was research assistant to Hayward Alker. Initially, Ashley's research was on the balance of power in international relations, particularly in his The Political Economy of War and Peace (1980). He soon began to shift his approach to metatheoretical questions and Critical Theory. By the mid-1980s, Ashley had adopted a postmodernist and subversive approach to international relations theory, exemplified by his influences: Jacques Derrida, Michel Foucault, and Gayatri Chakravorty Spivak.

Ashley was one of the first to challenge the position of mainstream realism and liberalism, most notably in "The Poverty of Neorealism" (1984).

== Early life ==
Ashley received his Bachelor of Arts degree from University of California, Santa Barbara in 1970, after which he entered graduate school in Massachusetts Institute of Technology (MIT) studying political science. He received his Doctorate of Philosophy from MIT in 1977, with a dissertation titled Growth, Rivalry, and Balance: The Sino-Soviet-American Triangle of Conflict (1976), supervised by Nazli Choucri.

== Career ==
Ashley studied under Hayward Alker and served as his research assistant. This relationship influenced Ashley's approach to international relations. Other influences include Jacques Derrida, Gayatri Chakravorty Spivak, Foucauldian discourse analysis, and Jürgen Habermas. For some time in the 1970s, Ashley was assistant professor of international relations at the University of Southern California.

Early in his career, with The Political Economy of War and Peace (1980), Ashley focused on conventional analysis of balance of power. He soon began to focus on metatheoretical issues instead. Before turning to postmodernist international relations, Ashley's early work moved to the direction of Critical Theory. He became the first scholar to introduce the thought of Habermas to international relations. All Ashley's major writings from this phase of the first half of the 1980s can be characterized as a critique of technical rationality in the study of international relations and advocacy of emancipatory ways of knowing. This approach is evident in his debates concerning Habermas with John H. Herz. Since the mid-1980s, his critique has become a self-confessed subversive dissidence of the discipline. Ashley has since distanced himself from his early work, considering it too ideological in its epistemology.

Ashley become one of the first to challenge the predominance of mainstream realism and liberalism in the 1980s.

Ashley retired in 2018. Prior he taught at Arizona State University's Department of Political Science (now School of Politics and Global Studies) since 1981, as an associate professor.

Some of Ashley's influential work includes "The Poverty of Neorealism" (1984) where he coined the term "neorealism" to describe the work of Kenneth Waltz and others. Indeed, Ashley's critique of microeconomic analogies employed by neorealists made him a key figure in the inter-paradigm debate in international relations theory. "Untying the Sovereign State: A Double Reading of the Anarchy Problematique" (1988) is a Derridan double reading of the concept of international anarchy in traditional international relations literature. "Living on Border Lines: Man, Poststructuralism, and War" (1989) is influential, too. In 1989, he contributed to the seminal volume International/Intertextual Relations edited by fellow postmodernists James Der Derian and Michael J. Shapiro. In addition, Ashley has contributed many academic articles to journals such as International Organization, Millennium, Alternatives, and International Studies Quarterly. Ashley is an editor of International Studies Quarterly.

According to Darryl S. L. Jarvis, "the undiminished allure of postmodernism [in international relations theory] is plainly attributable to ... Richard Ashley, and to a lesser extent, [R. B. J.] Walker", with whom Ashley has also written.

He received the Karl Deutsch Award of the International Studies Association in 1985.

== Works ==
- Ashley, Richard K. (1976). Growth, rivalry, and balance: the Sino-Soviet-American triangle of conflict (PhD thesis). Massachusetts Institute of Technology. OCLC 4200282.
- — (1980). The political economy of war and peace: the Sino-Soviet-American triangle and the modern security problematique. New York: Nichols Pub Co. ISBN 978-0-89397-087-1.
- — (1981). "Political Realism and Human Interests". International Studies Quarterly. 25 (2): 204–. doi:10.2307/2600353. ISSN 0020-8833. JSTOR 2600353.
- — (1983). "Three Modes of Economism". International Studies Quarterly. 27 (4): 463–. doi:10.2307/2600557. ISSN 0020-8833. JSTOR 2600557.
- — (1983). "[Review:] The Eye of Power: The Politics of World Modeling: [Simulated Worlds: A Computer Model of National Decision-Making by Stuart A. Bremer]". International Organization. 37 (3): 495–535. doi:10.1017/s0020818300032768. JSTOR 2706453. S2CID 154161793.
- — (1984). "The Poverty of Neorealism". International Organization. 38 (2): 225–286. doi:10.1017/s0020818300026709. JSTOR 2706440.
- — (1987). "The Geopolitics of Geopolitical Space: Toward a Critical Social Theory of International Politics". Alternatives: Global, Local, Political. 12 (4): 403–434. doi:10.1177/030437548701200401. ISSN 0304-3754. S2CID 147423943.
- — (1988). "Untying the Sovereign State: A Double Reading of the Anarchy Problematique". Millennium. 17 (2): 227–262. doi:10.1177/03058298880170020901. ISSN 0305-8298. S2CID 145130222.
- — (1989). "Imposing international purpose: notes on a problematic governance". In Czempiel, Ernst Otto; Rosenau, James N. (eds.). Global changes and theoretical challenges: approaches to world politics for the 1990s. Lexington: Lexington Books. pp. 251–290. ISBN 978-0-669-17878-4.
- — (1989). "Living on Border Lines: Man, Poststructuralism, and War". In Der Derian, James; Shapiro, Michael J. (eds.). International/intertextual relations: postmodern readings of world politics. Lexington: Lexington Books. pp. 259–321. ISBN 978-0-669-18956-8.
- — (1991). "The State of the Discipline: Realism Under Challenge?". In Higgott, Richard A.; Richardson, James L. (eds.). International relations: global and Australian perspectives on an evolving discipline. Dept. of International Relations, Research School of Pacific Studies, Australian National University. pp. 37–69. ISBN 978-0-7315-1284-3.
- — (1996). "The Achievements of Poststructuralism". In Smith, Steve; Booth, Ken; Zalewski, Marysia (eds.). International Theory: Positivism and Beyond. Cambridge: Cambridge University Press. pp. 240–253. ISBN 978-0-521-47948-6.
- — (2016). "Critical Spirits/Realist Specters: Some Hypotheses on the Spectro-Poetics of International Relations". In Soguk, Nevzat; Nelson, Scott G (eds.). The Ashgate Research Companion to Modern Theory, Modern Power, World Politics: Critical Investigations. London: Routledge. pp. 105–126. ISBN 978-1-317-19585-6.

=== With R. B. J. Walker ===
- Ashley, Richard K.; Walker, R. B. J. (1990). "Introduction: Speaking the Language of Exile: Dissident Thought in International Studies". International Studies Quarterly. 34 (3): 259–268. doi:10.2307/2600569. ISSN 0020-8833. JSTOR 2600569.
- —; — (1990). "Conclusion: Reading Dissidence/Writing the Discipline: Crisis and the Question of Sovereignty in International Studies". International Studies Quarterly. 34 (3): 367–416. doi:10.2307/2600576. ISSN 0020-8833. JSTOR 2600576.

== See also ==
- Genealogy (philosophy)
- Theory of International Politics
- Man, the State, and War
- Reflectivism
- Postpositivism (international relations)
- Lene Hansen
- Instrumental and value rationality
- Anti-foundationalism
- Relativism
- Deconstruction
- Constructivism (international relations)
- Postmodernism in political science
