= Timeline of Marrakesh =

The following is a timeline of the history of the city of Marrakesh, Morocco.

== Prior to 20th century ==
- 1070 CE - Marrakesh founded by Abu Bakr ibn Umar (or in 1062 according to some sources).
- 1071 - Ben Youssef Mosque built.
- 1117 - Almoravid Koubba built.
- 1127 - Ramparts of Marrakech built.
- 1129 - Battle of al-Buhayra - City besieged by Almohads.
- 1132 - Masjid al-Siqaya (mosque) built (approximate date).
- 1147 - Almohads in power.
- 1147 - Kutubiyya Mosque first built.
- 1157 - Agdal Gardens laid out.
- 1158 - Kutubiyya Mosque re-built.
- 1182 - Scholar Al-Suhayli arrives in Marrakesh (approximate date).
- 1188 - Bab Agnaou (gate) built.
- 1190 - Kasbah Mosque completed.
- 1195 - Kutubiyya Mosque minaret
- 1197 - New Kasbah of Marrakesh built.
- 1248 - Marinids in power.
- 1288 - Abu Yaqub in power.
- 1331 - Sidi Muhammad ibn Salih mosque built.
- 1350 - Traveler Ibn Battuta visits city.
- 1525 - Saadians in power.
- 1554 - Mohammed ash-Sheikh in power.
- 1557 - Zawiya of Sidi Muhammad Ben Sliman al-Jazuli built.
- 1565 - Ben Youssef Madrasa built.
- 1572 - Mouassine Mosque built.
- 1593 - El Badi Palace built.
- 1603 - Saadian Tombs built.
- 1606 - City taken by forces of Abd Allah.
- 1664 - 31 July: City taken by forces of Alaouite Al-Rashid of Morocco.
- 1746 - Mohammed ben Abdallah in power.
- 1900 - Bahia Palace built.

== 20th century ==
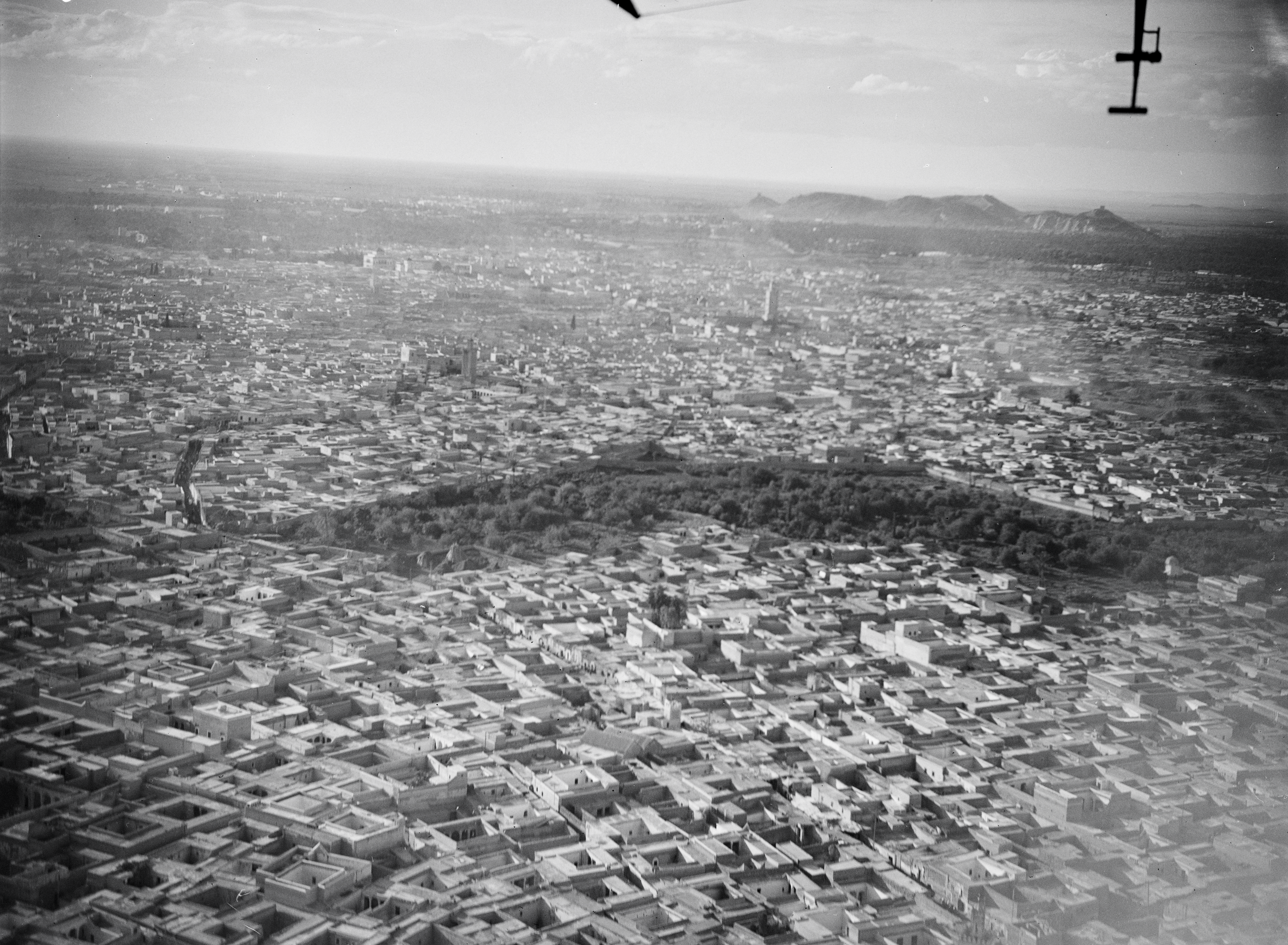
Aerial view of Marrakesh, circa 1931

- 1906 - Population: 50,000 to 60,000. (estimate).
- 1907 - Émile Mauchamp a French doctor, assassinated by a mob.
- 1912
  - Mauritanian Ahmed al-Hiba in power.
  - 6 September: Battle of Sidi Bou Othman occurs near city.
  - September: City occupied by French forces.
  - Fort built.
- 1919 - Guéliz area planned.
- 1923
  - Marrakesh railway station built.
  - La Mamounia hotel in business.
  - Public library opens.
- 1926 - Population: 149,263.
- 1932 - Dar Si Said (museum) opens.
- 1943 - Tower of the Koutoubia Mosque painted by Winston Churchill
- 1947
  - Majorelle Garden opens.
  - Kawkab Marrakech football club formed.
- 1948 - Mouloudia de Marrakech football club formed.
- 1951 - Population: 215,312.
- 1973 - Population: 330,400 city; 436,300 urban agglomeration.
- 1978 - Cadi Ayyad University established.
- 1985 - Medina of Marrakesh UNESCO World Heritage Site established.
- 1987
  - Marrakech Marathon begins.
  - École supérieure de commerce de Marrakech (school) established.
- 1994
  - August: Hotel shooting.
  - Population: 745,541.
- 1996 - Musée Bert-Flint (museum) opens.
- 2000 - École nationale des sciences appliquées de Marrakech established.

== 21st century ==
- 2004 - Population: 823,000.
- 2005 - Marrakech Biennale begins.
- 2009 - Fatima-Zahra Mansouri becomes mayor.
- 2011
  - 28 April: 2011 Marrakesh bombing at Jemaa el-Fnaa.
  - Stade de Marrakech (stadium) opens.
  - TEDx Marrakesh begins.
  - Population: 939,000.
- 2014
  - August: 2014 African Championships in Athletics held in city.
  - Population: 978,045 (estimate).
- 2015 - City becomes part of the Marrakesh-Safi administrative region.
- 2016 - November: 2016 United Nations Climate Change Conference (COP22) held in city.
- 2022 - October: Consulate of Poland established (see also Morocco–Poland relations).
- 2023 - September: A M_{w} 6.9 earthquake strikes Al Haouz Province; over 2,900 die and the city's historic landmarks was destroyed. Eighteen people die in the city.

== See also ==
- History of Marrakesh
- Imperial cities of Morocco
- Timelines of other cities in Morocco: Casablanca, Fez, Meknes, Rabat, Salé, Tangier
- History of Morocco

== Bibliography ==
=== in English ===
- Josiah Conder (1830), "City of Morocco", The Modern Traveller, London: J.Duncan
- Leo Africanus; John Pory (1896), "Citie of Maroco", in Robert Brown (ed.), History and Description of Africa, vol. 2, London: Hakluyt Society, OCLC 2649691 (written in 16th century)
- S. L. Bensusan (1904). Morocco. London: A & C Black. (includes Marrakesh)
- "Marrākesh" . Encyclopædia Britannica. Vol. 17 (11th ed.). 1910. p. 753.
- "Marrakesh". Encyclopaedia of Islam. E.J. Brill. 1927. p. 296+. ISBN 9004097961.
- James A. Miller (2005). "Marrakech". In Kevin Shillington (ed.). Encyclopedia of African History. Fitzroy Dearborn. p. 948. ISBN 978-1-135-45670-2.
- C. Edmund Bosworth, ed. (2007). "Marrakesh". Historic Cities of the Islamic World. Leiden: Koninklijke Brill. pp. 319+. ISBN 978-9004153882.
- "History". Marrakech. Time Out. 2007. p. 12+. ISBN 978-1-84670-019-4.
- Bruce E. Stanley; Michael R.T. Dumper, eds. (2008). "Marrakesh". Cities of the Middle East and North Africa. Santa Barbara, USA: ABC-CLIO. p. 246+.
- "Marrakesh". Grove Encyclopedia of Islamic Art & Architecture. Oxford University Press. 2009. ISBN 978-0-19-530991-1.

=== in French ===
- Paul Lambert (1868). "Notice sur la ville de Maroc". Bulletin de la Société de Géographie (in French). Paris.
- Ch. Brossard, ed. (1906). "Maroc: Description des villes: Merrakech". Colonies françaises. Géographie pittoresque et monumentale de la France (in French). Paris: Flammarion. (+ table of contents)
- Maurice de Périgny (1918). Au Maroc; Marrakech. Collection les pays modernes (in French). P. S. Roger et cie.
- Jean-François Troin (1986). "Marrakech revisitée ou les villes dans la ville". Méditerranée (in French). 59 (4): 13–19. doi:10.3406/medit.1986.2423 – via Persee.fr.
- Jean-François Troin (1995). "Fès et Marrakech: Evolution comparée de deux capitales régionales marocaines". Cahiers de la Méditerranée (in French). 50: 149–169. doi:10.3406/camed.1995.1143 – via Persee.fr.
- "Chronologie". Marrakech (in French). Petit Futé. 2009. ISBN 9782746926042.
- Anne-Claire Kurzac-Souali (2011). "Marrakech, insertion mondiale et dynamiques socio-spatiales locales". Méditerranée (in French). 116 (116): 123–132. doi:10.4000/mediterranee.5441 – via Revues.org.
- Chloé Pellegrini (2016). "Parcours de petits entrepreneurs français à Marrakech" [French Entrepreneurs in Marrakesh]. Cahiers d'Études africaines (in French) (221–222) – via Revues.org.
