= Timeline of Casablanca =

Coordinates: 33°32′N 7°35′W

The following is a timeline of the history of the city of Casablanca, Morocco.

== Prior to 20th century ==
- 1st C. CE - "Anfus" created by Romans as a port
- 11th C. CE - Anfa founded by Zanata Berbers. The word Anfa means the hill in the local amazigh dialect .
- 1468 - Anfa sacked by Portuguese forces.
- 1770 - City walls rebuilt by the Sultan Mohammed ben Abdallah also called Mohammed III (approximate date).
- 1830 - Port re-opens to commerce.
- 1900 - Population: 20,000.

== 20th century ==
- 1906 - Port of Casablanca construction begins.
- 1907
  - 30 July: Anti-European unrest; crackdown by French forces.
  - Casa-Port Railway Terminal opens.
- 1912
  - French protectorate established.
- 1914 - Population: 78,000.
- 1915 - The Franco-Moroccan Fair runs from 5 September to 5 November
- 1918 - Public library opens.
- 1923 - Casa-Voyageurs Railway Station opened.
- 1927 - Population: 120,000.
- 1929 - Casablanca Stock Exchange established.
- 1931 - 1 August: Honorary Consulate of Poland opened.
- 1935 - Vox Cinema opens.
- 1937 - Wydad Club Athletic formed
- 1940
  - Casablanca under control of Vichy France.
  - October: Forced labour camp established by the Germans.
- 1942
  - November: Forced labour camp dissolved.
  - 8–16 November: Naval Battle of Casablanca.
  - 26 November: American fictional movie Casablanca released.
- 1943 - January: Allied Casablanca Conference held.
- 1949 - Raja Club Athletic formed.
- 1951 - Population: 682,388.
- 1952 - December: "Anti-French riots."
- 1959 - Afriquia SMDC oil company headquartered in Casablanca.
- 1960 - Population: 967,000 (urban agglomeration).
- 1965
  - 22 March: "Uprising of students and workers."
  - September: 1965 Arab League summit held.
- 1971 - Maroc Soir newspaper begins publication.
- 1973 - Population: 1,371,330 city; 1,753,400 urban agglomeration.
- 1975 - University of Hassan II Casablanca established.
- 1980s - City "organized into five separate prefectures."
- 1980
  - Planning commission formed.
  - Population: 2,109,000 (urban agglomeration).
- 1981 - 6 June: "Bread riots."
- 1986 - Meeting of the Association Internationale des Maires Francophones held in city.
- 1989 - 1989 Jeux de la Francophonie held in Casablanca.
- 1990 - Population: 2,682,000 (urban agglomeration).
- 1993
  - Hassan II Mosque built.
  - Population: 2,943,000 urban agglomeration (estimate).
- 1999 - l’Boulevard des Jeunes Musicians hip hop festival begins.
- 2000 - Population: 2,937,000 (urban agglomeration).

== 21st century ==
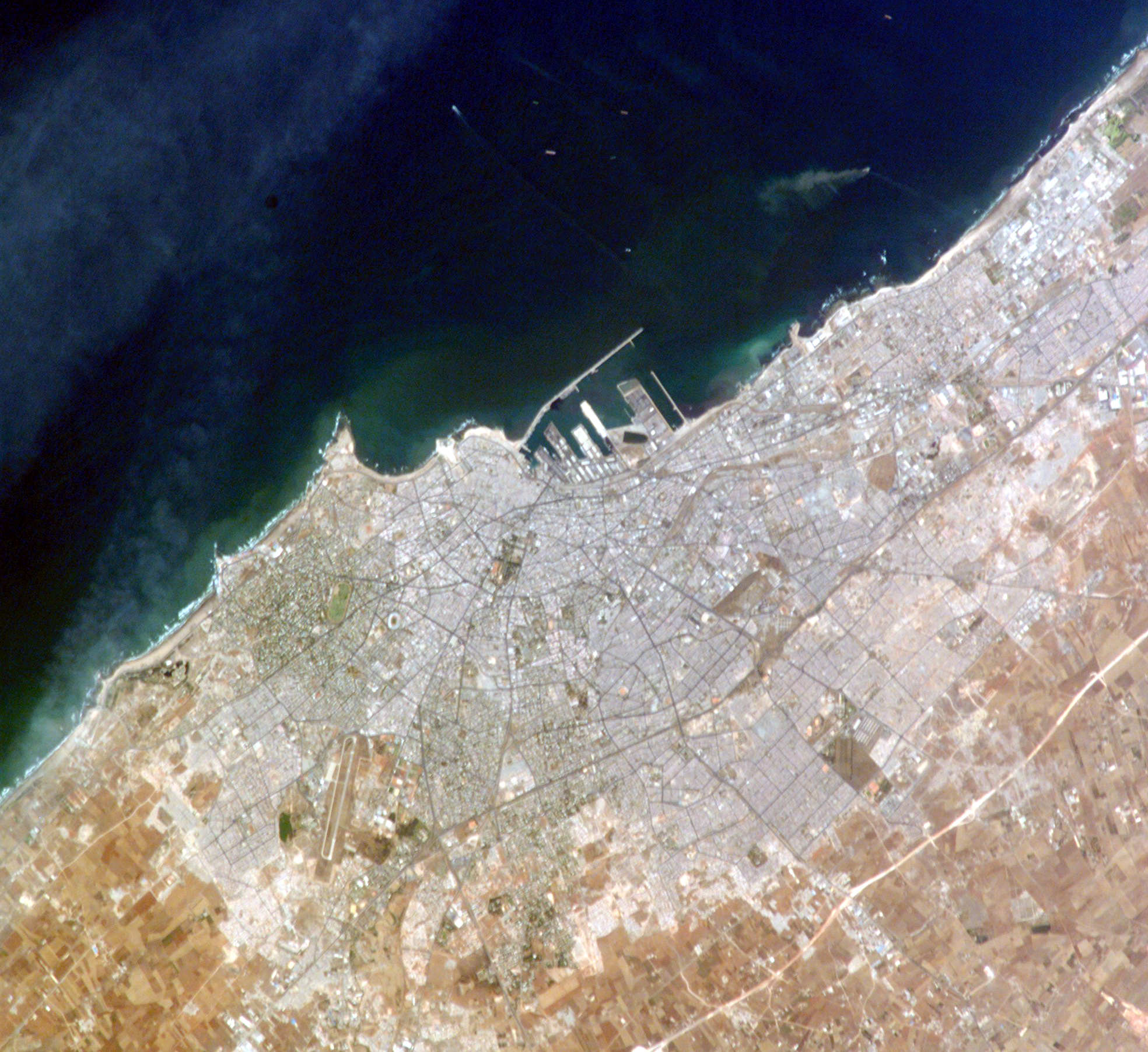
Satellite view of Casablanca, circa 2005

- 2003
  - 16 May: 2003 Casablanca bombings.
  - Mohamed Sajid becomes mayor.
- 2007 - March–April: 2007 Casablanca bombings.
- 2012
  - May: "Trade union rally."
  - Casablanca Tramway begins operating.
- 2014: 3,352,399 inhabitants in the city (estimate) and almost seven million in the metropolitan area according to the official census of 2014.
- 2015 - City becomes part and capital of the Casablanca-Settat administrative region.

== See also ==
- History of Casablanca
- Timelines of other cities in Morocco: Fes, Marrakesh, Meknes, Rabat, Salé, Tangier
- Timeline of Morocco

== Bibliography ==
=== in English ===
- Leo Africanus; John Pory (1896), "Of Anfa a towne in Temesna", in Robert Brown (ed.), History and Description of Africa, vol. 2, London: Hakluyt Society, OCLC 2649691 (written in the 16th century)
- "Casablanca" . Encyclopædia Britannica. Vol. 5 (11th ed.). 1910. p. 440.
- "Al-Dar al-Bayda". Encyclopedia of Islam. Leiden: Brill. 1985.
- Susan Ossman (1994). Picturing Casablanca: Portraits of Power in a Modern City. University of California Press. ISBN 978-0-520-91431-5.
- Mark Ellingham (2001), "Casablanca", Rough Guide to Morocco (6th ed.), London: Rough Guides, p. 299+, OL 24218635M
- Jean-Louis Cohen; Monique Eleb (2003). Casablanca: colonial myths and architectural ventures. Monacelli Press. ISBN 978-1-58093-087-1.
- Paul Tiyambe Zeleza; Dickson Eyoh, eds. (2003). "Casablanca, Morocco". Encyclopedia of Twentieth-Century African History. Routledge. ISBN 0-415-23479-4.
- James A. Miller (2005). "Casablanca". In Kevin Shillington (ed.). Encyclopedia of African History. Fitzroy Dearborn. p. 222. ISBN 978-1-135-45670-2.
- Thomas K. Park; Aomar Boum (2006). "Casablanca". Historical Dictionary of Morocco (2nd ed.). Scarecrow Press. ISBN 978-0-8108-6511-2.
- Jean-Louis Cohen (2008). "Casablanca". The City in the Islamic World. Leiden: Koninklijke Brill. p. 1009+. ISBN 978-90-04-16240-2.
- Michael R.T. Dumper; Bruce E. Stanley, eds. (2008), "Casablanca", Cities of the Middle East and North Africa, Santa Barbara, US: ABC-CLIO, p. 114+

=== in French ===
- Maurice de Périgny [in French] (1919). Au Maroc; Casablanca-Rabat-Meknes (in French). Paris P. Roger.
- Albert Charton (1924). "Casablanca". Annales de géographie (in French). 33 (183): 303–307. doi:10.3406/geo.1924.9684 – via Persee.fr.
- E.B.; J. C. Santucci (1993), "Casablanca", Encyclopédie berbère (in French), 12 (12): 1812–1822, doi:10.4000/encyclopedieberbere.2096 – via Revues.org
- "Histoire". Casablanca (in French). Petit Futé. 2013. p. 31+. ISBN 978-2-7469-6459-4.
