= Timeline of Meknes =

The following is a timeline of the history of the city of Meknes, Morocco.

== Prior to 20th century ==
- 40 CE - Romans in power in Volubilis.
- 217 CE - Caracallas Victory Arch erected (approximate date) in Volubilis.
- 285 CE - Volubilis "abandoned by the Roman military;" Berber Baqates subsequently rise to power.
- 10th century CE - Zenata Berber Miknasa settle in area (approximate date).
- 1140/1141 - Siege of Meknes by forces of Abd al-Mu'min begins (approximate date).
- 1150 - Siege of Meknes ends; Almohads sack town.
- 1170s - Al-Najjarin mosque minaret built.
- 1236/1237 - Marinids occupy Meknes.
- 1245/1246 - Marinid governor killed.
- 13th century: "Aqueduct, several bridges, a kasbah, mosques" and madrasas ('Attaririn, Filala, Jadida) built.
- 1345 - Bou Inania Madrasa (Meknes) (school) built (approximate date).
- 15th century: Maraboutic zawiya established.
- 1526 - Death of religious leader Mohammed al-Hadi ben Issa.
- 1640 - Dila in power.
- 1672 - "Mulay Ismail makes Meknes the capital of the kingdom and starts work on his royal fortress complete with palaces, granaries, lakes and stables."
- 1693 - The Franciscans open a mission and hospital after having provided spiritual care for Christian captives in Meknes since 1672. Moulay Ismail grants them protection under a dahir in 1698.
- 1703 - Mulay Ismail Mausoleum construction begins.
- 1709 - Bab Berdieyinne Mosque completed.
- 1727 - Death of Mulay Ismail.
- 1732/1733 - Madinat al-Riyad demolished.
- 1755 - Earthquake.
- 1832 - French artist Delacroix visits Meknes.
- 1882 - Palais Dar Jamaï (palace) construction begins.
- 1889 - Bab Dar al-Makhzen (gate) built.^{(fr)}

== 20th century ==
- 1902 - Population: 20,000 (estimate).
- 1911 - French military under Moinier take Meknes during the French conquest of Morocco.
- 1913 - Dar El Bachaouate built.
- 1914 - École française de Meknès (school) organized.
- 1918 - Military school founded.
- 1926 - Dar Jamai museum established.
- 1937 - Anti-French unrest.
- 1942 - École nationale d'agriculture de Meknès (school) founded.
- 1947 - Meknes Chamber of Commerce and Industry founded.
- 1951 - Population: 140,380.
- 1960 - Population: 175,943.
- 1962
  - Stade d'Honneur (stadium) opens.
  - COD Meknès (football club) formed.
- 1967 - June: Ethnic unrest.
- 1973 - Population: 244,520.
- 1982 - Faculté des sciences de Meknès (college) established.
- 1989 - Moulay Ismail University founded.
- 1994 - Population: 443,214.
- 1996 - City historic centre designated an UNESCO World Heritage Site.
- 1997 - École nationale supérieure d'arts et métiers (school) established.

== 21st century ==
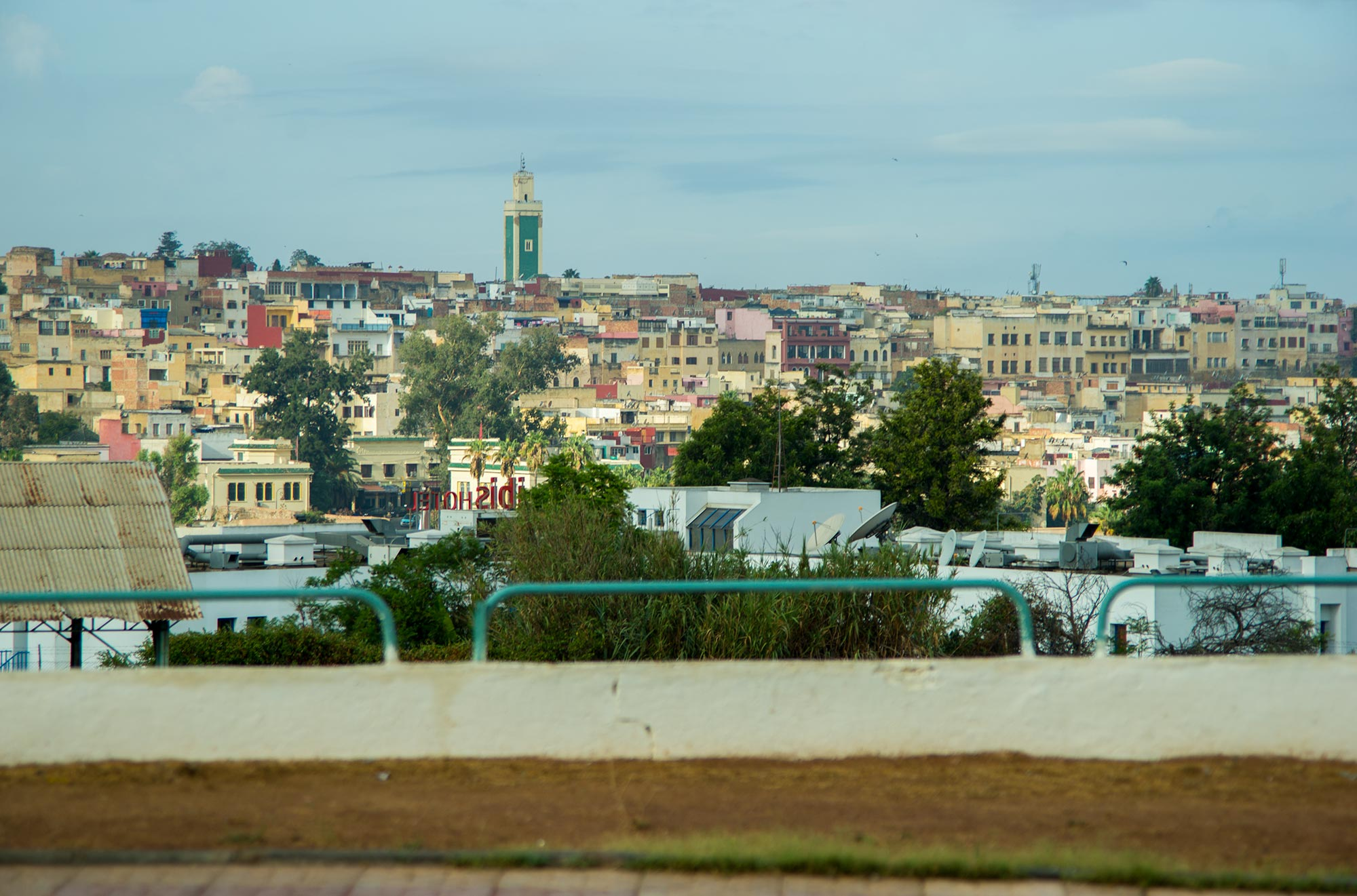
View of Meknes, 2014

- 2003 - Aboubakr Belkora becomes mayor.
- 2004 - Population: 536,322.
- 2005 - Hassan Aourid becomes governor.
- 2007 - Wine festival held.
- 2009 - Ahmed Hilal becomes mayor.
- 2010 - 19 February: Collapse of minaret of Bab Berdieyinne Mosque; dozens of fatalities.
- 2014 - Population: 685,408 (estimate).
- 2015
  - Abdallah Bouanou becomes mayor.
  - City becomes part of the Fès-Meknès administrative region.

== See also ==
- Meknes history (fr)
- Timelines of other cities in Morocco: Casablanca, Fes, Marrakesh, Rabat, Salé, Tangier
- Timeline of Morocco

== Bibliography ==
in English

- John Windus (1725). Journey to Mequinez.
- "Mequinez", Jewish Encyclopedia, vol. 8, New York, 1906, hdl:2027/mdp.49015002282243
- "Mequinez" . Encyclopædia Britannica. Vol. 18 (11th ed.). 1910. pp. 147–148.
- "Miknās", Encyclopaedia of Islam (2nd ed.), 1993
- C. Edmund Bosworth, ed. (2007). "Meknes". Historic Cities of the Islamic World. Leiden: Koninklijke Brill. p. 395+.
- Bruce E. Stanley; Michael R.T. Dumper, eds. (2008), "Meknes", Cities of the Middle East and North Africa, Santa Barbara, US: ABC-CLIO, p. 248+, ISBN 9781576079195
- "Meknès." Grove Encyclopedia of Islamic Art and Architecture. Ed. Jonathan M. Bloom and Sheila S. Blair. Oxford University Press, 2010

in French

- Octave Houdas [in French] (1885). "Monographie de Méquinez". Journal asiatique (in French).
- Maurice de Périgny [in French] (1919). Au Maroc; Casablanca-Rabat-Meknes (in French). Paris P. Roger.
- Laribe; et al. (1922). "Meknès". Maroc pittoresque: Fès-Meknès-et-région: album de photographies (in French). Marseille. pp. 72–98.
- Pierre Champion [in French] (1924). Tanger, Fés et Meknès (in French). Paris. OCLC 470064237.
- Marianne Barrucand (1985). Urbanisme princier en islam: Meknès et les villes royales islamiques post-médiévales (in French). Paris: Librairie orientaliste Paul Geuthner. ISBN 978-2705302375.
- Bibliographie de Meknes (in French), 1988
- Samuel Pickens (1995). Maroc: Les cités impériales: Fès, Marrakech, Meknès, Rabat-Salé (in French). Paris. ISBN 9782867700750.
- Mehdi Nabti [in French] (2010). "Le mussem de Meknès: Le déclin d'une tradition spirituelle". L'Homme (in French). 193 (193): 137–165. doi:10.4000/lhomme.24352 – via Revues.org.
- Élodie Valette; Patrick Dugué (2017). "L'urbanisation, facteur de développement ou d'exclusion de l'agriculture familiale en périphérie des villes: Le cas de la ville de Meknès, Maroc". lt=VertigO |VertigO (journal) (in French). 17. doi:10.4000/vertigo.18413 – via Revues.org.
