= Postmodernism (disambiguation) =

Postmodernism is a philosophical concept.

It may also refer to:

- Postmodernity

or the influence of Postmodernism in various disciplines:

- Postmodern art
- Postmodern feminism
- Postmodern film
- Postmodernism (international relations)
- Postmodern literature
- Postmodernism (music)
- Postmodernism (political science)
- Postmodern philosophy
- Postmodern theatre

or foundational books about the topic:

- Postmodernism, or, the Cultural Logic of Late Capitalism, by Fredric Jameson
- The Postmodern Condition, by Jean-François Lyotard

== See also ==
- Postmodernism Generator, a computer program
