= Timeline of Rabat =

Coordinates: 34.020882°N 6.84165°W

The following is a timeline of the history of the city of Rabat, Morocco.

== Prior to 20th century ==
For the earlier history of the region of Rabat see Chellah

- 1150 CE - Citadel construction begins.
- 1627 - Rabat and Salé form the Republic of Bou Regreg.
- 1864 - Dar al-Makhzen (palace) built.

== 20th century ==
- 1912 - Moroccan capital relocated to Rabat from Fes.
- 1915 - Musée National des Bijoux à Rabat active.
- 1916 - Lycée Moulay Youssef (school) opens.
- 1919 - Stade Marocain football club formed.
- 1923 - Stade de FUS (stadium) opens.
- 1924 - Bibliothèque Nationale du Royaume du Maroc established.
- 1944 - Centre cinématographique marocain headquartered in Rabat.
- 1946 - Fath Union Sport football club formed.
- 1948 - National School of Administration (ENA) established.
- 1951 - Population: 156,209.
- 1955 - Rabat becomes capital of independent Morocco.
- 1957 - Moulay-Hassan Bridge opens.
- 1958 - Association Sportive des Forces Armées Royales football club formed.
- 1959 - Maghreb Arabe Press established.
- 1960 - Population: 233,000.
- 1961 - National Institute of Statistics and Applied Economics established.
- 1962 - Théâtre national Mohammed-V opens.
- 1967 - Association Marocaine de la Recherche et de l'Echange Culturel established.
- 1969 - Organisation of Islamic Cooperation founded in Rabat.
- 1973 - Population: 435,510 city; 596,600 urban agglomeration.
- 1974 - 1974 Arab League summit held.
- 1979 - Islamic Educational, Scientific and Cultural Organization headquartered in city.
- 1980
  - École nationale d'architecture de Rabat (school) established.
  - Population: 808,000.
- 1981 - National Institute for Urban and Territorial Planning headquartered in Rabat.
- 1982 - Meeting of the Association Internationale des Maires Francophones held in city.
- 1983 - Prince Moulay Abdellah Stadium opens.
- 1985 - August: 1985 Pan Arab Games held.
- 1987 - Universite Mohammed V's Centre D'etudes Strategiques established.
- 1989
  - 1989 Jeux de la Francophonie held in Rabat.
  - Arab Maghreb Union headquartered in Rabat.
- 1991 - Casablanca–Rabat expressway built.
- 1993 - Population: 1,220,000 urban agglomeration (estimate).
- 1999 - Rabat–Fes expressway built.
- 2000 - Population: 1,507,000.

== 21st century ==
- 2005 - Rabat–Tangier expressway built.
- 2009 - Fathallah Oualalou becomes mayor.
- 2010
  - Rabat Ringroad construction begins.
  - June–July: African Youth Games held in Rabat
- 2011
  - February: Political demonstration.
  - Rabat-Salé tramway begins operating.
  - Population: 1,843,000.
- 2012 - Rabat–Salé Airport new terminal opens.
- 2013 - Archives du Maroc opens.
- 2014 - Population: 578,644 (estimate).
- 2015 - City becomes part of the Rabat-Salé-Kénitra administrative region.

== See also ==
- Rabat history
- Timelines of other cities in Morocco: Casablanca, Fez, Marrakesh, Meknes, Salé, Tangier
- Timeline of Morocco

== Bibliography ==
in English

- Janet L. Abu-Lughod (1980). Rabat: Urban Apartheid in Morocco. Princeton University Press. ISBN 978-1-4008-5303-8.
- Paul Tiyambe Zeleza; Dickson Eyoh, eds. (2003). "Rabat, Egypt". Encyclopedia of Twentieth-Century African History. Routledge. ISBN 0415234794.
- Jamila Bargach (2008). "Rabat". In Yasser Elsheshtawy (ed.). The Evolving Arab City: Tradition, Modernity and Urban Development. Routledge. ISBN 978-1-134-12821-1.

in French

- Maurice de Périgny [in French] (1919). Au Maroc; Casablanca-Rabat-Meknes (in French). Paris P. Roger.
- Sylviane Munoz (1981). "Les structures démographiques d'une capitale coloniale: la population de Rabat en 1952". Cahiers de la Méditerranée (in French). 23: 23–70. doi:10.3406/camed.1981.928 – via Persee.fr.
- Safaa Monqid (2009). "Les morisques et l'édification de la ville de Rabat" [Moors and the building of the city of Rabat]. Cahiers de la Méditerranée (in French). 79 – via Revues.org.
- Sonia Serhir (2017). "Hay Ryad à Rabat: de la ville nouvelle au quartier?". Cahiers d'EMAM (in French). 29 (29). doi:10.4000/emam.1376 – via Revues.org. (About Hay Ryad quarter)

== Images ==
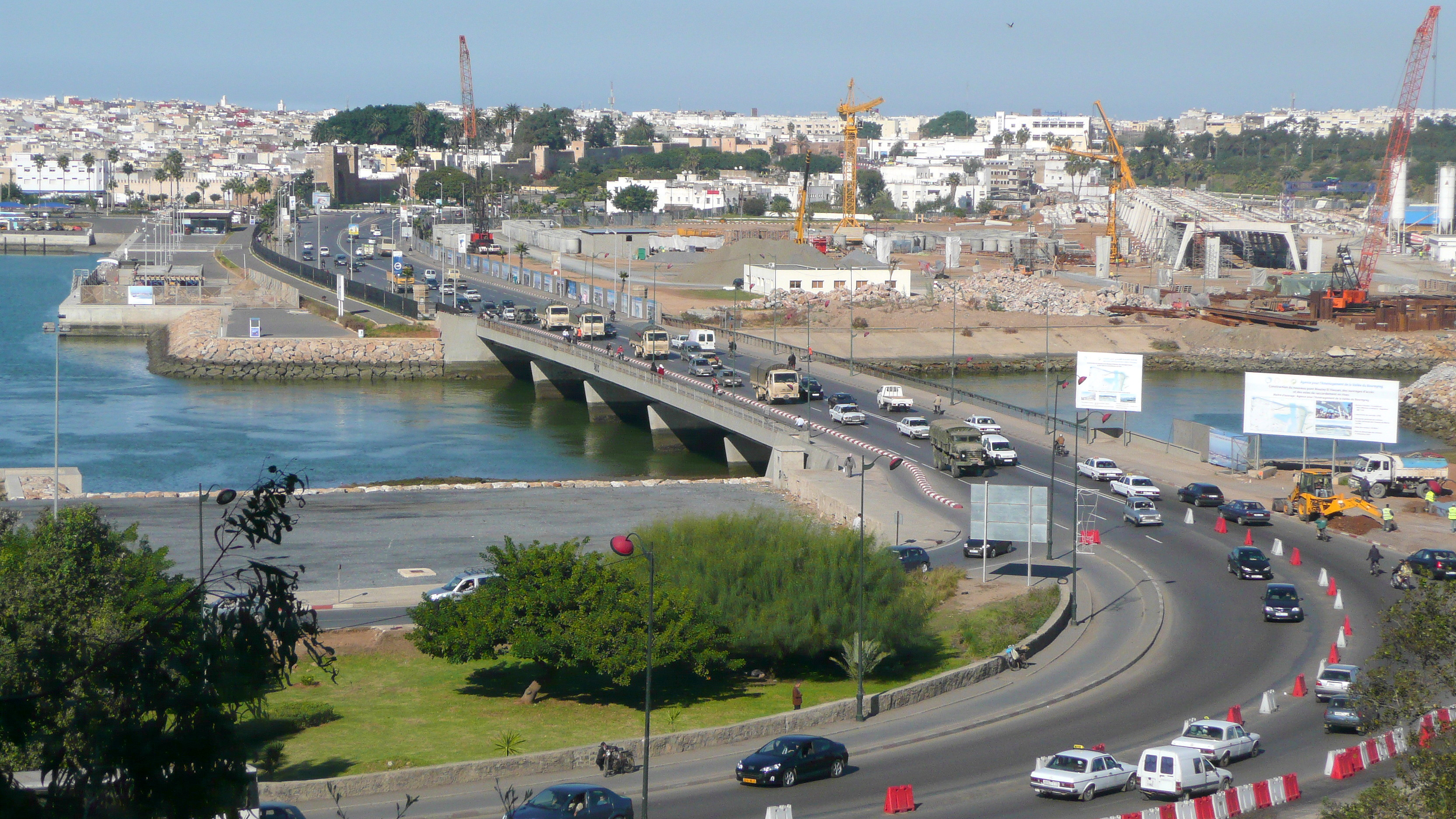
Moulay-Hassan Bridge, Rabat, opened in 1957

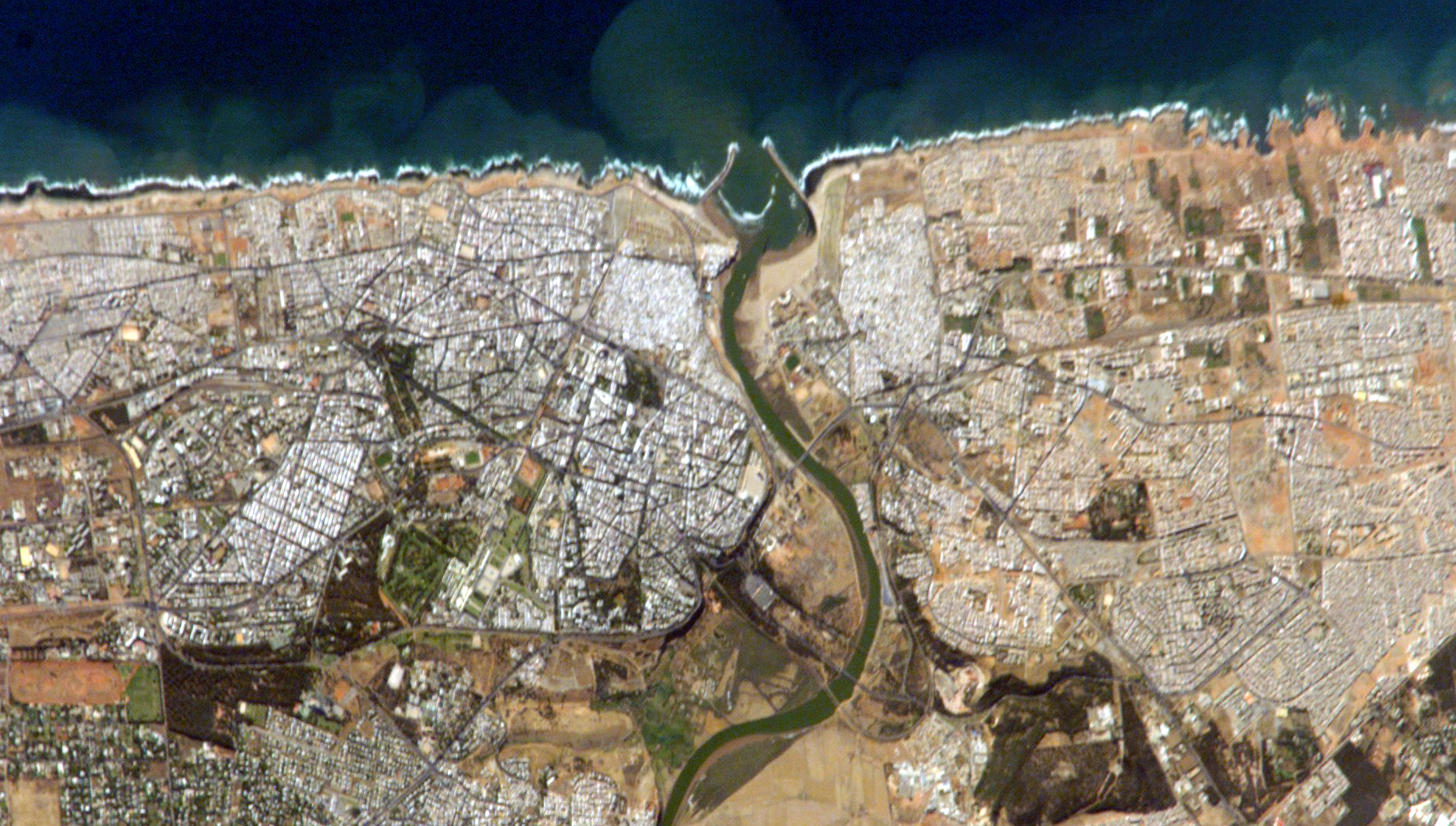
Satellite view of Rabat, 2005

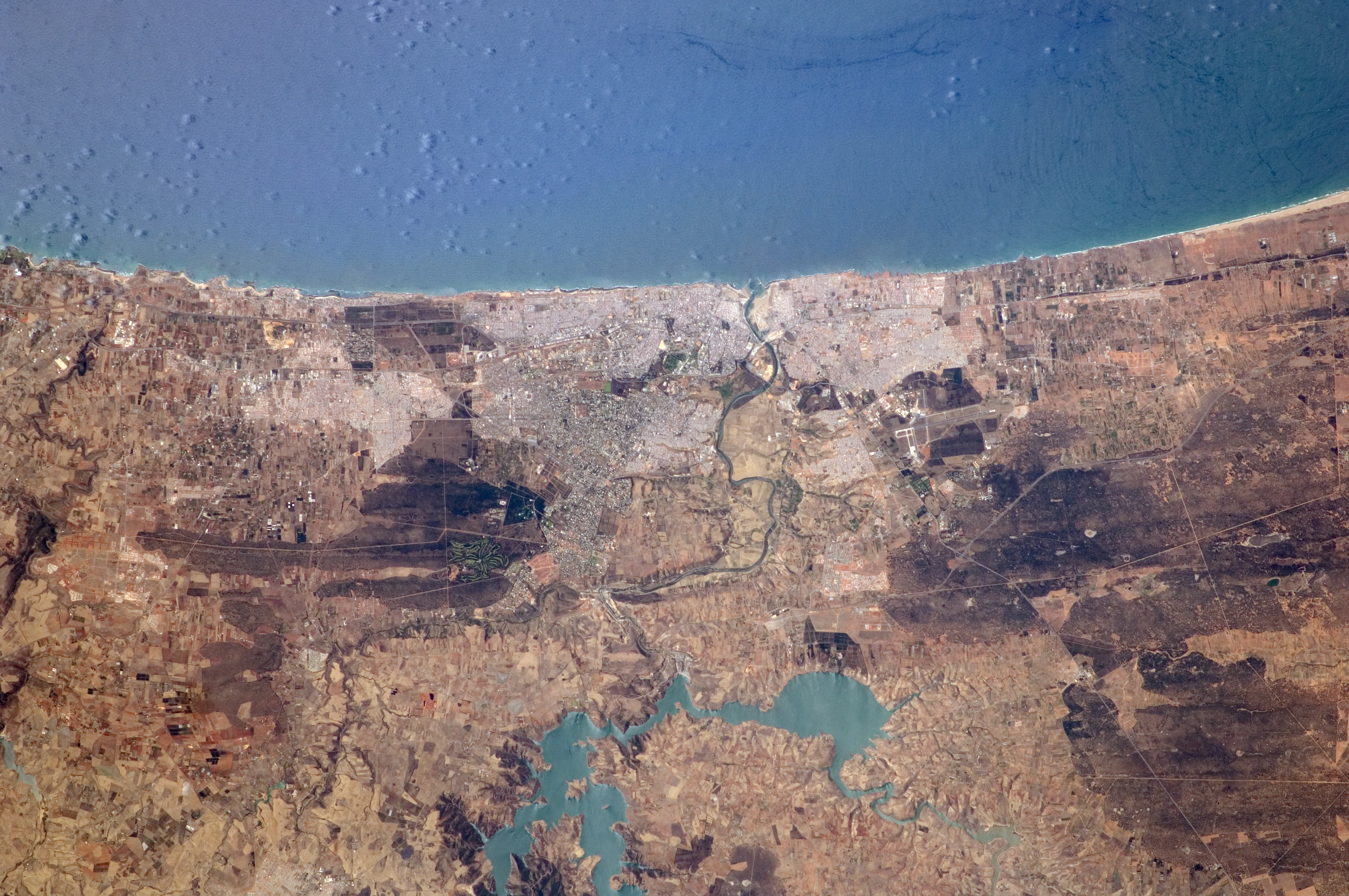
View of Rabat from space, 2010
