= Timeline of Fez =

The following is a timeline of the history of the city of Fez, Morocco.

== Prior to 20th century ==
- 789 – Madinat Fas settlement (later Fes el Andalous) established by Idris I of Morocco.
- 809 – Second settlement (later Fes el Karaouyine) established by Idris II of Morocco.
- 818 – Andalucian Arab refugees arrive (approximate date).
- 825 – Tunisian Kairouan refugees arrive.
- 828 – Idris II of Morocco dies.
- 848 – Yahya ibn Muhammad in power.
- 859 – Al-Qarawiyyin Mosque founded.
- 980 – Maghrawa in power.
- 1033 – 1033 Fez massacre of Jews.
- 1070 – Almoravids in power.
- 1145 – Almohads take city.
- 1204 – the fortifications of Fes el-bali completed.
- 1248 – Marinids in power.
- 1276 – Fes Jdid built.
- 1325 – Al-Attarine Madrasa completed.
- 1355 – Bou Inania Madrasa completed.
- 1357 – Dar al-Magana water clock built.
- 1408 – Lalla Ghariba mosque built at Fes Jdid.
- 1437 – Probable date of the transfer of Jewish population of Fes el-Bali to the Mellah in Fes Jdid.
- 1465 – 1465 Moroccan revolt.
- 1472 – Wattassids in power.
- 1522 – Earthquake.
- 1554 – Capture of Fez by the Ottoman Empire
- 1554 – Recapture of Fez by the Saadian Sultan Mohammed Al-Shaykh.
- 1576 – Capture of Fez by Abu Marwan Abd al-Malik I Saadi and his forces.
- 1670 – Cherratine Madrasa rebuilt.

== 20th century ==
- 1912
  - March: Morocco becomes a French protectorate, per Treaty of Fez.
  - April: 1912 Fez riots.
  - Moroccan capital relocated from Fez to Rabat.
- 1913 – Bab Boujeloud (gate) refurbished.
- 1916 – Ville Nouvelle founded.
- 1917 – Kissariyya market fire.
- 1920 – Public library opens.
- 1931 - Future billionaire Othman Benjelloun born in Fez.
- 1940 - student music association orchestra at fez as now music Institute in fez has founded there. (First called fez youth orchestra)
- 1942 – Cinema Rex opens.
- 1946 – Maghreb Association Sportive de Fez football club formed.
- 1948 – Widad Fez football club formed.
- 1951 - Population: 179,372.
- 1963 – University of al-Qarawiyyin active.
- 1973 - Population: 321,460 city; 426,000 urban agglomeration.
- 1981 – Medina of Fez designated an UNESCO World Heritage Site.
- 1988 - A Trappist community is founded upon invitation of the archbishop of Rabat and is housed in the former Bellevue Hotel. The monks move in 1999 to Midelt.
- 1990 – 14 December: Labour strike.
- 1993 - Population: 564,000 urban agglomeration (estimate).
- 1994 – World Sacred Music Festival begins.
- 1999 – Rabat–Fes expressway built.

== 21st century ==
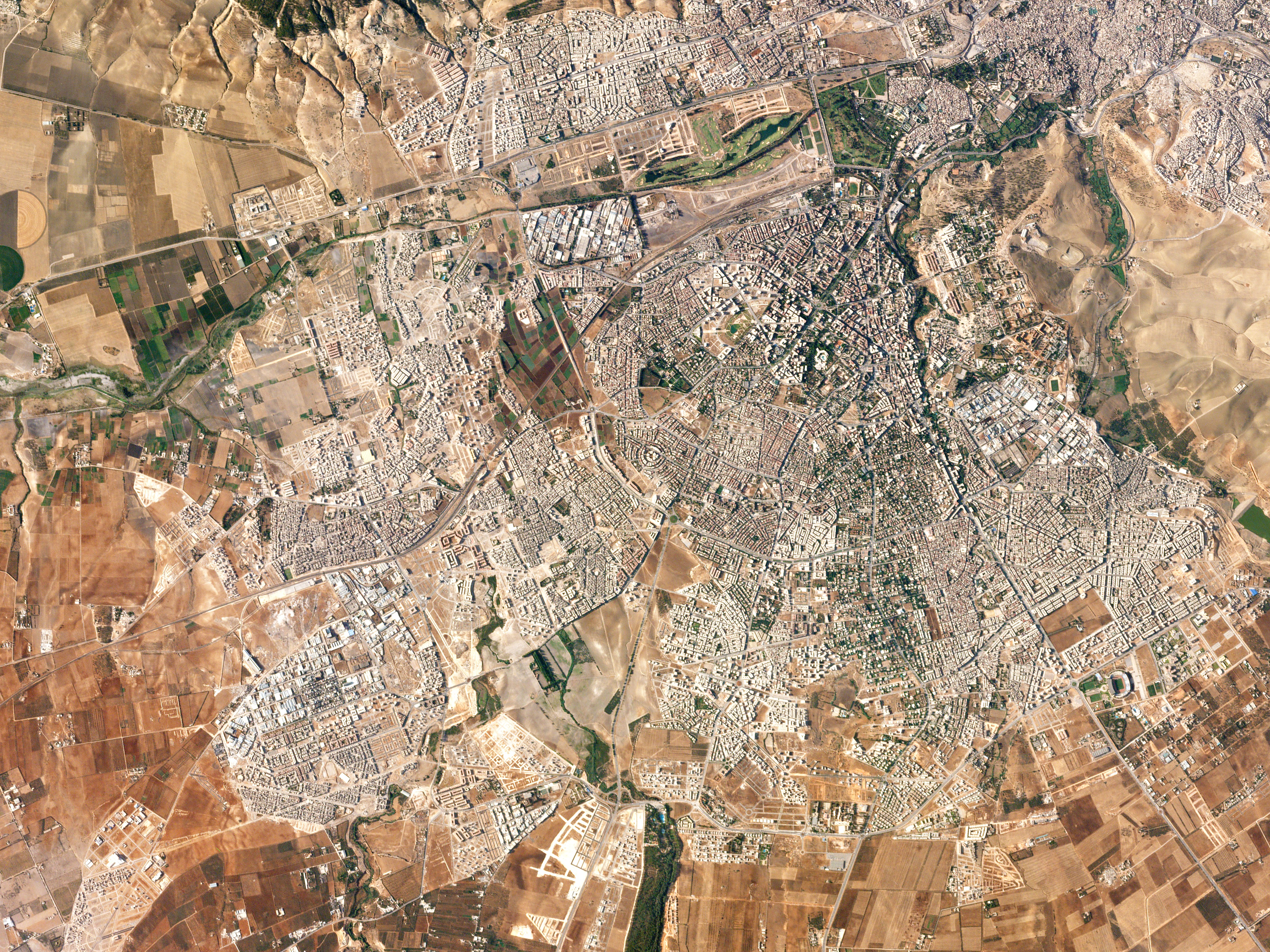
Satellite view of Fez, 2016

- 2003 – Hamid Chabat becomes mayor.
- 2004 – Population: 947,000.
- 2005 – École nationale des sciences appliquées de Fès (school) established.
- 2007 – After a construction period from 1994 to 2003,Fez Stadium opens in 2007.
- 2011 ** International Institute for Languages and Cultures established.
  - Population: 1,088,000.
- 2014 - Population: 1,126,551 (estimate).
- 2015
  - City becomes part of the Fès-Meknès administrative region.
  - Idriss Azami Al Idrissi becomes mayor.

== See also ==
- Fez history
- Timelines of other cities in Morocco: Casablanca, Marrakesh, Meknes, Rabat, Salé, Tangier
- Timeline of Morocco

== Bibliography ==
=== in English ===
Published in 19th century

- Jedidiah Morse; Richard C. Morse (1823), "Fez", A New Universal Gazetteer (4th ed.), New Haven: S. Converse
- Josiah Conder (1830), "City of Fez", The Modern Traveller, London: J.Duncan
- H.M.P. de la Martinière (1889), "(Fez)", Morocco: Journeys in the Kingdom of Fez and to the Court of Mulai Hassan, London: Whittaker & Co., OCLC 4428176
- Leo Africanus; John Pory (1896), "Fez", in Robert Brown (ed.), History and Description of Africa, vol. 2, London: Hakluyt Society, OCLC 2649691 (written in 16th century)

Published in 20th century

- "Fez" . Encyclopædia Britannica. Vol. 10 (11th ed.). 1910. pp. 306–307.
- Edith Wharton (1920), "Fez", In Morocco, New York: Scribner
- "Fez, Heart of Morocco", National Geographic Magazine, vol. 67, Washington DC, 1935
- Arden, Harvey (March 1986). "Morocco's Ancient City of Fez". National Geographic. 169 (3): 330–353. ISSN 0027-9358.
- Noelle Watson, ed. (1996). "Fes". International Dictionary of Historic Places: Middle East and Africa. UK: Routledge. p. 275+. ISBN 978-1884964039.
- M. Laetitia Cairoli (1999). "Garment Factory Workers in the City of Fez". Middle East Journal. 53 (1): 28–43. JSTOR 4329282. PMID 22010309.
- Stefano Bianca (2000), "(Fez)", Urban form in the Arab world, Verlag der Fachvereine Hochschulverlag AG an der ETH Zurich, ISBN 978-3728119728

Published in 21st century

- Mark Ellingham (2001), "Fes", Rough Guide to Morocco (6th ed.), London: Rough Guides, p. 198+, OL 24218635M
- Josef W. Meri, ed. (2006). "Fez". Medieval Islamic Civilization. Routledge. p. 257+. ISBN 978-0-415-96691-7.
- C. Edmund Bosworth, ed. (2007). "Fez". Historic Cities of the Islamic World. Leiden: Koninklijke Brill. pp. 137+. ISBN 978-9004153882.
- Simon O'Meara (2007). "Foundation Legend of Fez". In Amira K. Bennison and Alison L. Gascoigne (ed.). Cities in the Pre-Modern Islamic World. Routledge. p. 27+. ISBN 978-1-134-09650-3.
- Michael R.T. Dumper; Bruce E. Stanley, eds. (2008), "Fez", Cities of the Middle East and North Africa, Santa Barbara, USA: ABC-CLIO, pp. 151–153
- "Fez". Grove Encyclopedia of Islamic Art & Architecture. Oxford University Press. 2009.
- Rachel Newcomb (2009). Women of Fes: Ambiguities of Urban Life in Morocco. University of Pennsylvania Press. ISBN 978-0-8122-4124-2.

=== in French ===
- Histoire des souverains du Maghreb (Espagne et Maroc) et annales de la ville de Fès (in French). 1860.
- Ch. Brossard, ed. (1906). "Maroc: Description des villes: Fes". Colonies françaises. Géographie pittoresque et monumentale de la France (in French). Paris: Flammarion. (+ table of contents)
- Laribe; et al. (1922). Maroc pittoresque: Fès-Meknès-et-région: album de photographies (in French). Marseille.
- Maurice de Périgny (1922). Au Maroc; Fès, la capitale du nord. Pays modernes (in French). P. Roger.
- A. Fejjal (1986). "Industrie et industrialisation à Fès". Méditerranée (in French). 59 (4): 63–74. doi:10.3406/medit.1986.2427.
- Jean-François Troin (1995). "Fès et Marrakech: Evolution comparée de deux capitales régionales marocaines". Cahiers de la Méditerranée (in French). 50: 149–169. doi:10.3406/camed.1995.1143.
- C. Agabi; J. C. Santucci (1997). "Fès. (Fas)". Fès (in French). Vol. 18. Éditions Peeters. pp. 2766–2777. ISBN 978-2-85744-948-5 – via Revues.org.
- Mohamed Métalsi (2002). Fès, la ville essentielle (in French). Paris.
- Brahim Akdim; Mohamed Laaouane (2010). "Patrimoine et développement local à Fès: priorités, acteurs et échelles d'action". Norois (in French). 214 (1): 9–21. doi:10.4000/norois.3083 – via Revues.org.
