= Timeline of Tangier =

Coordinates: 35°46′N 5°48′W

The following is a timeline of the history of the city of Tangier, Morocco.

== Ancient Ages ==
- 42 CE – Tingis becomes capital of the Roman province of Mauretania Tingitana.
- 429 CE – Vandals take Tingis.

== Middle Ages ==
- 534 - Conquered by the Eastern Roman Empire
- 700s – Arab rule begins.
- 790 – Idrissid rule begins
- 927 – Caliphate of Córdoba
- 1026 – Taifa of Málaga
- 1026 – Taifa of Ceuta
- 1078 – Almoravid dynasty rule
- 1147 – Almohad dynasty
- 1244 – Marinid dynasty (1244–1465).
- 1304 – Ibn Battuta is born.
- 1437 – Battle of Tangier, attempt by a Portuguese expeditionary force to seize the citadel of Tangier, and their subsequent defeat by the armies of the Marinid sultanate .
- 1471 – Portuguese of Tangier rule (1471–1661) begins, under Afonso V of Portugal.
- 1580 - Spain in power. (Iberian Union)
- 1656 - Portugal in power again. (Portuguese Restoration War)

== Modern Ages ==
- 1661 – English Tangier (1661–1684), English colonial rule.
- 1677 – The English banished all Jews from Tangiers.
- 1678 – City besieged by forces of Moulay Ismail.
- 1684 – Moroccan rule begins with end of English Tangier.
- 1815 – Grand Mosque of Tangier rebuilt.
- 1821 – American Legation building in use.
- 1844
  - 6 August: Bombardment of Tangiers (by the French).
  - October: Treaty of Tangiers signed in city.
- 1883 – Al-Moghreb al-Aksa newspaper begins publication.

== 20th century ==
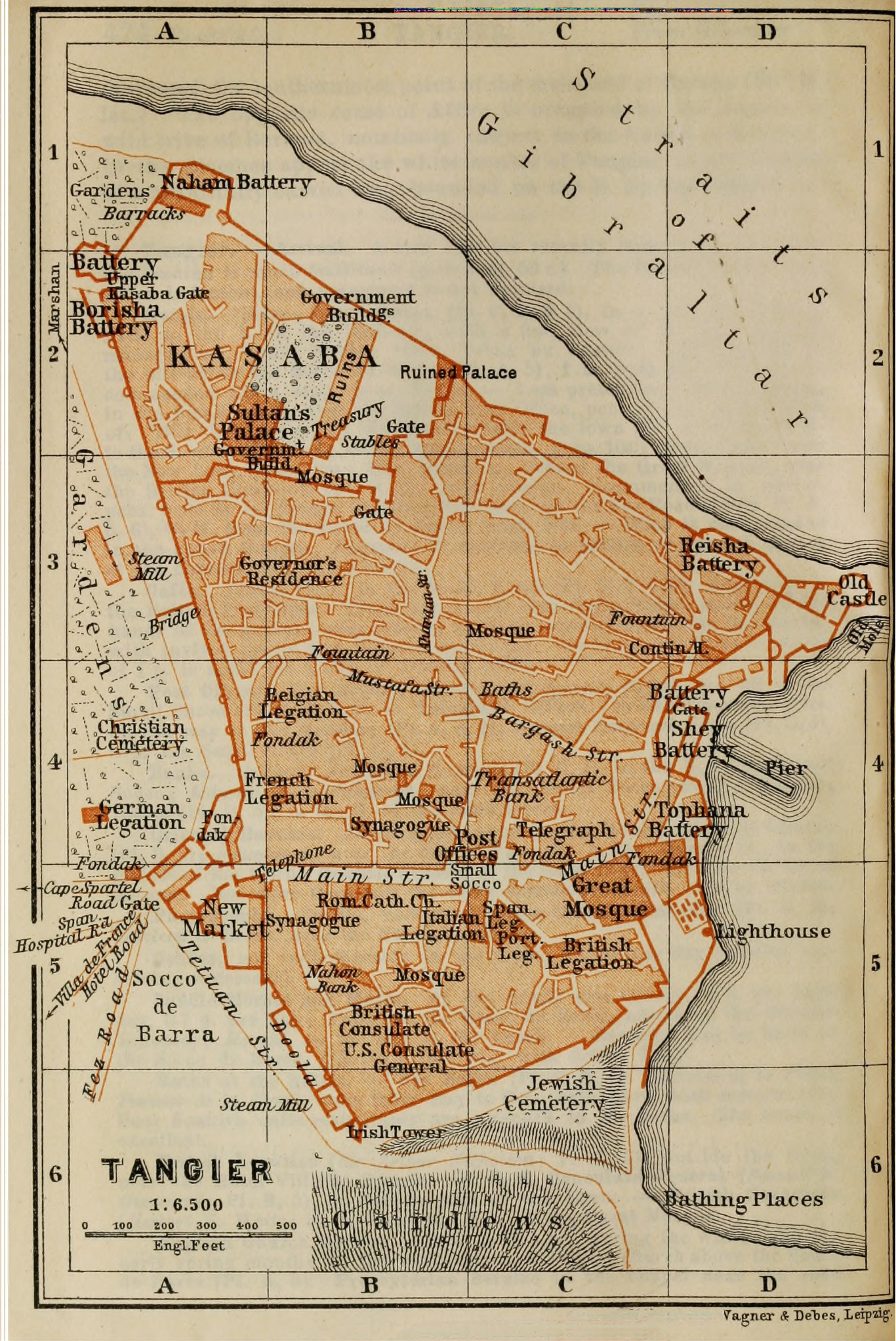
Tangier in 1901

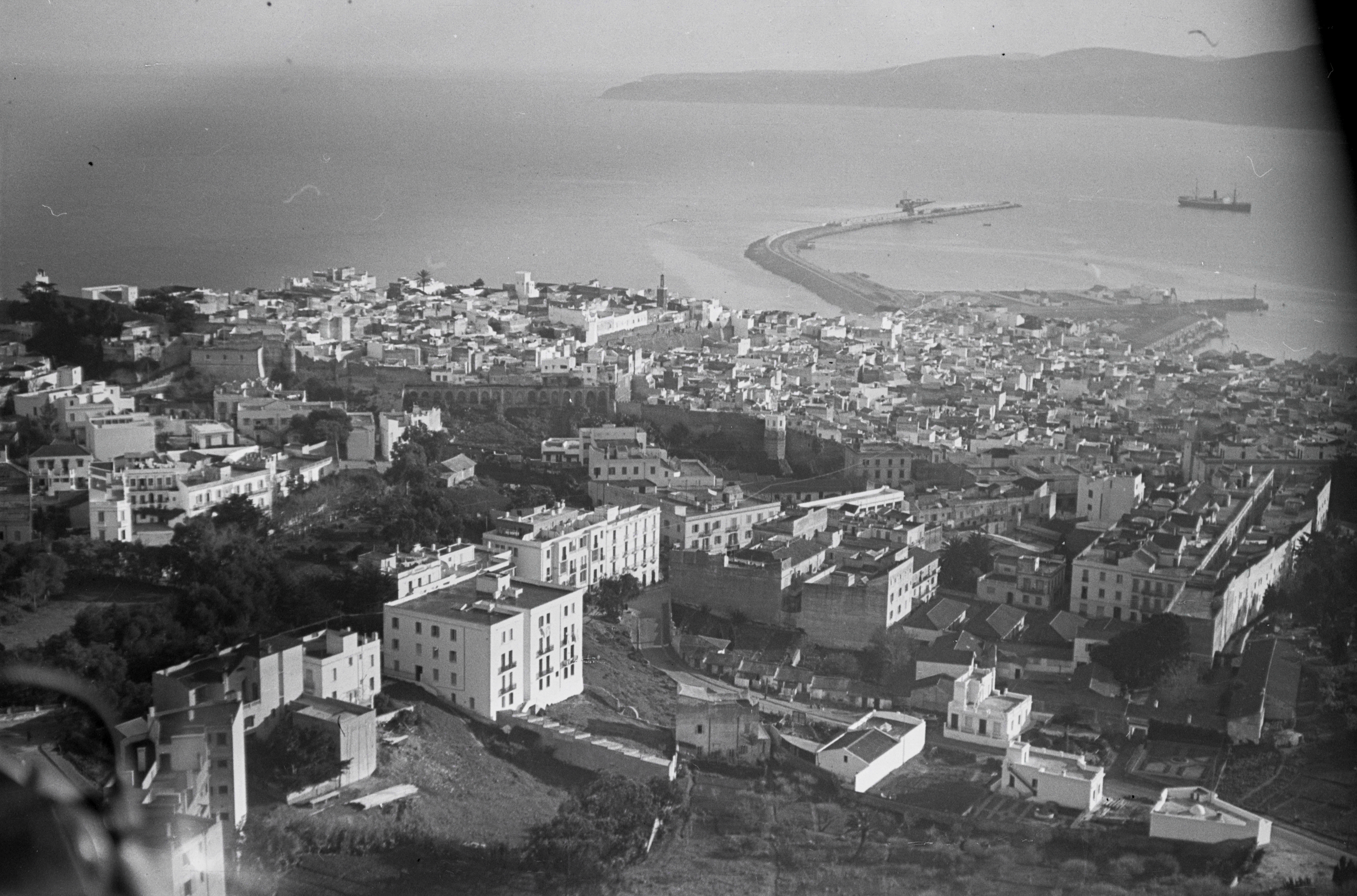
Aerial view of Tangier, 1932

- 1904 – Journal de Tanger newspaper begins publication.
- 1905
  - La Dépêche marocaine newspaper begins publication.
  - Anglican Church of St. Andrew consecrated.
- 1905/06 - First Moroccan Crisis leading to the Algeciras Conference
- 1910 - Population: 40,000 (approximate figure).
- 1911 - Agadir Crisis & Treaty of Fes (1912)
- 1913 – Gran Teatro Cervantes opens.
- 1917 – Sidi Bou Abib Mosque built.
- 1920 – Gran Cafe de Paris in business.
- 1921 – Café Hafa opens.
- 1925 – Tangier International Zone in effect, per Tangier Protocol.
- 1937 – Dean's Bar in business.
- 1939 – Stade de Marchan (stadium) built.
- 1940 – 14 June: City occupied by Spanish forces.
- 1945 – 11 October: City returned to international status.
- 1947
  - Sultan Mohammed V of Morocco gives speech at the Grand Socco.
  - American writer Paul Bowles moves to Tangier.
- 1948 – Cinema Rif opens.
- 1952 – 30 March: Political demonstration.
- 1956
  - 8 October: City becomes part of independent Morocco; Tangier International Zone disestablished.
- 1960 – Population: 141,714.
- 1973 – Population: 185,850.
- 1983 – Ittihad Riadi Tanger football club formed.
- 1993 – Population: 307,000 urban agglomeration (estimate).

== 21st century ==
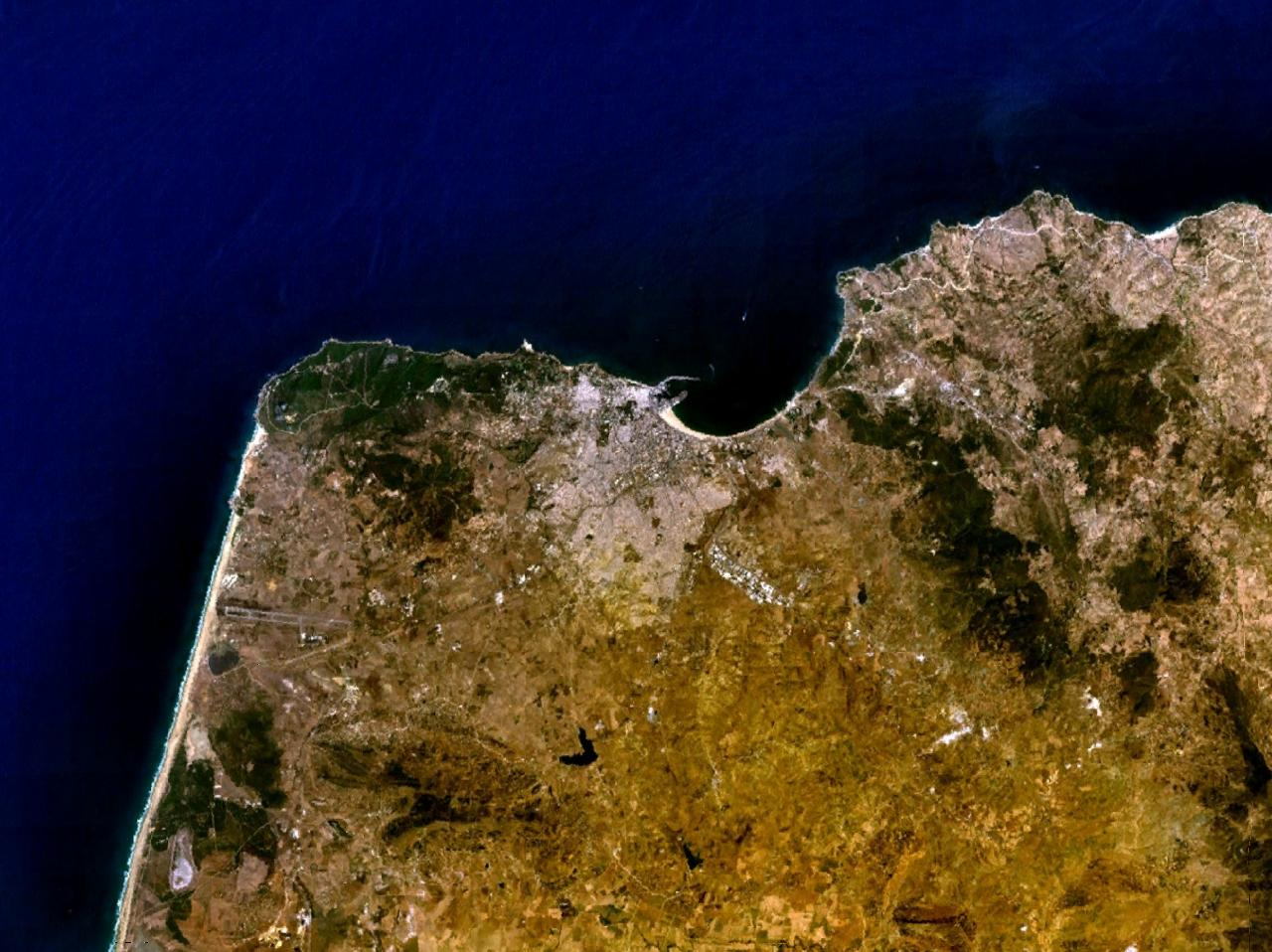
Satellite view of Tangier, circa 2005

- 2005 – Rabat–Tangier expressway constructed.
- 2003 - Tanger-Med (industrial port complex) supervisory board created.
- 2006 – Cinematheque de Tanger opens.
- 2008
  - Tanger-Med port begins operating near city.
  - Tangier Ibn Battouta Airport new terminal building opens.
- 2011
  - Grand Stade de Tanger (stadium) opens.
  - Kenitra–Tangier high-speed rail line construction begins.
- 2014 - Population: 998,972 (estimate).
- 2015 – City becomes part of the Tanger-Tetouan-Al Hoceima administrative region.

== See also ==
- Tangier history
- Chronology of Tangier (in French)
- List of governors of Tangier, 15th to 17th centuries
- Timelines of other cities in Morocco: Casablanca, Fez, Marrakesh, Meknes, Rabat, Salé
- Timeline of Morocco

== Bibliography ==
Published in 19th century

- Ali Bey al-Abbasi (1816), "Chapters 2–4 (Tangier)", Travels of Ali Bey in Morocco, Tripoli, Cyprus, Egypt, Arabia, Syria, and Turkey, Between the Years 1803 and 1807, Philadelphia: John Conrad, OCLC 754174
- Arthur de Capell Brooke (1831). "Tangier". Sketches in Spain and Morocco. London: Henry Colburn and Richard Bentley. OCLC 13783280.
- "Tangiers" . Encyclopædia Britannica. Vol. 23 (9th ed.). 1888. p. 46.
- H.M.P. de la Martinière (1889). "(Tangier)". Morocco: Journeys in the Kingdom of Fez and to the Court of Mulai Hassan. London: Whittaker & Co. OCLC 4428176.

Published in 20th century

- S. L. Bensusan (1904). Morocco. London: A and C Black.
- Ch. Brossard, ed. (1906). "Maroc: Description des villes: Tanger". Colonies françaises. Géographie pittoresque et monumentale de la France (in French). Paris: Flammarion. (+ table of contents)
- "Tangier" . Encyclopædia Britannica. Vol. 26 (11th ed.). 1910. pp. 397–398.
- "Tangier", The Mediterranean, Leipzig: Karl Baedeker, 1911, OCLC 490068
- Noelle Watson, ed. (1996). "Tangier". International Dictionary of Historic Places: Middle East and Africa. UK: Routledge. pp. 665+. ISBN 978-1884964039.

Published in 21st century

- Mark Ellingham (2001), "Tangier", Rough Guide to Morocco (6th ed.), London: Rough Guides, p. 79+, OL 24218635M
- Marian Aguiar (2005). "Tangier". In Kwame Anthony Appiah and Henry Louis Gates (ed.). Africana: The Encyclopedia of the African and African American Experience (2nd ed.). Oxford University Press. p. 120. ISBN 978-0-19-517055-9.
- Kevin Shillington, ed. (2005). "Tangier". Encyclopedia of African History. Fitzroy Dearborn. ISBN 978-1-57958-245-6.
- Michael R.T. Dumper; Bruce E. Stanley, eds. (2008). "Tangier". Cities of the Middle East and North Africa. Santa Barbara, US: ABC-CLIO.
- Zoubir Chattou (2011). "Tanger à la croisée de nouvelles recompositions territoriales et de mobilités transnationales" [Tangier, transnational mobilities and territorial restructuring]. Méditerranée (in French). 116 (116): 133–138. doi:10.4000/mediterranee.5447 – via Revues.org.
- Martin Malcolm Elbl. Portuguese Tangier (1471-1662): Colonial Urban Fabric as Cross-Cultural Skeleton (Baywolf Press: Toronto and Peterborough, 2013) ISBN 978-0-921437-50-5.
- Josh Shoemake (2013). Tangier: A Literary Guide for Travellers. I.B.Tauris. ISBN 978-0-85773-376-4.
