= João Pontes Nogueira =

Brazilian academic

- Born: Brazil

Academic background
- Education: University of Denver
- Doctoral advisor: Jack Donnelly
- Influences: Gilles Deleuze, Henri Lefebvre, R. B. J. Walker.

Academic work
- Discipline: International Relations, International Political Sociology
- Institutions: Pontifical Catholic University of Rio de Janeiro
- Main interests: International relations theory, International Political Sociology, Political Philosophy

João Pontes Nogueira is an academic at the Pontifical Catholic University of Rio de Janeiro. He was an editor for the peer-reviewed English language academic journal, International Political Sociology, from 2012 to 2016. His most influential work is Teoria das Relações Internacionais (Elsevier/Campus, 2005), written with Nizar Messari (Al Akhawayn University).

He is a leading Brazilian scholar of critical international relations theory. He has published on international relations theory, cities, humanitarianism, BRICS, space, and spatiality. His work is influenced by post-structuralism, especially Deleuze and Guattari, and by the Philosophy of Henri Lefebvre.

== Selected bibliography ==
=== Journal articles ===
- Nogueira, João Pontes; Huysmans, Jef (June 2022). "La contribución de la Sociología Política Internacional al pensamiento crítico en Relaciones Internacionales". Relaciones Internacionales], 50, 85-105, doi:10.15366/relacionesinternacionales2022.50.004.
- Nogueira, João Pontes; Huysmans, Jef (December 2016). "Ten years of IPS: fracturing IR". International Political Sociology. 10 (4). Oxford University Press: 299–319. doi:10.1093/ips/olw025.
- Nogueira, João Pontes (February 2017), "From failed states to fragile cities: redefining spaces of humanitarian practice", Third World Quarterly, 38 (7), 1–17, doi:10.1080/01436597.2017.1282814.
- Nogueira, João Pontes (June 2003). "Ética e violência na teoria das relações internacionais: uma reflexão a partir do 11 de Setembro". Contexto Internacional, 25 (1), 81–102, doi:10.1590/S0102-85292003000100003.
