= Open Edition =

Open edition or OpenEdition may refer to:

- Open edition, a printed edition of a publication limited only by the number that can be sold or produced before the plate wears out
- OpenEdition.org, an open access academic publishing portal of the Centre pour l'Édition Électronique Ouverte, France. It focuses on humanities and social sciences publications.
  - OpenEdition Books
  - OpenEdition Journals
- OpenEdition Shell and Utilities Feature for VM/ESA, the original name of z/VM OpenExtensions Shell and Utilities
- OpenEdition MVS, the original name of UNIX System Services.
