= R. B. J. Walker =

British and Canadian political scientist

- Born: 1947 (age 78–79); Reading, Berkshire, UK
- Citizenship: British & Canadian

Academic background
- Education: Queen's University (MA & Ph.D); University of Wales, Swansea (B.A.)

Academic work
- Institutions: University of Victoria & Pontifical Catholic University of Rio de Janeiro
- Main interests: Political theory, global politics, concepts of space/time, principles and practices of sovereignty, and early modern political thought
- Notable works: Inside/Outside: International Relations as Political Theory

R. B. J. "Rob" Walker (born May 1947) is a British-Canadian political theorist and professor emeritus of Political Science at the University of Victoria in British Columbia. His research examines political theory and international relations, with a focus on sovereignty, political subjectivity, boundaries, spatiality, temporality, and the distinction between domestic and international politics.

He was a founding co-editor, with Didier Bigo, of the journal International Political Sociology and was associated for many years with Alternatives: Global, Local, Political.

His books include Inside/Outside: International Relations as Political Theory (1993), After the Globe/Before the World (2009), and Out of Line: Essays on the Politics of Boundaries and the Limits of Modern Politics (2016).

== Biography ==
Walker was born in Reading, England, in May 1947. He studied at the University College of Wales, Swansea, from 1965 to 1968, initially focusing on geography before turning to political studies and political theory. He later pursued graduate studies at Queen's University in Kingston, Ontario, where his research examined the relationship between spatiality, scientific thought, and modern political organization. He completed his doctorate in 1977.

== Academic career ==
Walker held research fellowships at the Killam Foundation, Princeton University, and the Australian National University. He joined the University of Victoria in 1980, where he became Professor of Political Science and served as department chair and in graduate-program leadership roles. He also helped establish the interdisciplinary Graduate Program in Cultural, Social and Political Thought. Walker later held international appointments, including Professor of International Relations at Keele University from 1999 to 2008 and at the Pontifical Catholic University of Rio de Janeiro from 2010 to 2020. He also held visiting positions at universities in Europe, North America, Australia, and Asia.

== Research ==
Walker's research focuses concerning the organization and limits of modern political order. Recurring subjects in his work include sovereignty, political subjectivity, political space, political time, boundaries, borders, security, citizenship, and the relationship between domestic and international politics. A central theme of his work is the distinction between the "inside" and "outside" of political communities. Walker has examined how the division between domestic politics and international relations has been constructed within modern political thought and has questioned the assumption that the two constitute completely separate political domains.

His work also examines the historical relationship between concepts of space and time and political organization. He has drawn on political philosophy, intellectual history, theology, and the history and philosophy of science to examine how political communities are represented and differentiated. Walker is associated with critical and poststructural approaches to international relations. His work has engaged with the writings of philosophers and theorists including Jacques Derrida, Michel Foucault, and Gilles Deleuze.

=== International political theory ===
Walker's early publications addressed the relationship between political theory and international politics. In Political Theory and the Transformation of World Politics (1980), he examined the theoretical foundations of world politics and the possibilities for political change. His paper, World Politics and Western Reason: Universalism, Pluralism, Hegemony (1982), considered the influence of Western political thought on conceptions of international order, particularly the tensions between universalism, pluralism and hegemony.

His 1993 book Inside/Outside: International Relations as Political Theory examined the conceptual distinction between domestic and international politics.

In After the Globe/Before the World (2009), Walker developed his analysis of the conceptual frameworks through which global political order is understood. The book considered relationships among sovereignty, globalization, political boundaries, and conceptions of the world.

=== Sovereignty and boundaries ===
Walker's research also focuses on Questions of sovereignty and political boundaries. He examines sovereignty as a principle through which political authority, territorial divisions and political identities are established. His work also considers how boundaries distinguish political communities and define relations between those included within them and those placed outside them.

Security and political order

Walker's work on security examines its relationship with sovereignty, political authority and territorial boundaries. He has considered how security claims shape the exercise of political authority and influence the definition of political communities. His writings also address the relationship between liberty and security and the implications of exceptional measures for sovereignty and the organization of political order.

=== Research collaborations ===
Walker participated in the World Order Models Project, an international research initiative associated with Richard Falk and Saul Mendlovitz that examined alternative approaches to international political order. His academic work has involved collaborations with scholars and research institutions in India, Europe, Latin America, Australia and North America, including the Centre for the Study of Developing Societies in New Delhi. He has also worked with scholars in political theory, postcolonial studies, international relations and critical theory.

Walker has been associated with critical approaches to international relations developed by scholars including Richard Ashley, Michael Shapiro, James Der Derian and Michael Dillon.

=== Editorial works ===
Walker served as an editor of Alternatives: Global, Local, Political, a journal covering international relations, political theory and global politics. He also co-founded International Political Sociology with Didier Bigo.

== Bibliography ==
- Inside/Outside: International Relations as Political Theory (Cambridge: Cambridge University Press, 1993).
- One World, Many Worlds: Struggles For A Just World Peace (Boulder, CO: Lynne Rienner; London: Zed Books, 1988).
- Out of Line: Boundaries, Borders, Limits (London: Routledge, forthcoming July 2015).
- Europe’s 21st Century Challenge (London: Ashgate, in press for 2010). Coauthored with Didier Bigo, Elspeth Guild and Serge Carerra.
- After the Globe/Before the World (London: Routledge, 2010).
