= Nevzat Soguk =

Professor of political science

Nevzat Soguk is a professor of political science at the University of Hawaiʻi at Mānoa, specializing in the areas of globalization, migration and critical international relations theory.

== Education ==
Soguk graduated from Gazi University in Turkey in 1985. After a 1990 master's degree from Ohio University, he went to Arizona State University for doctoral study. He completed his Ph.D. there in 1995 with the dissertation Refugee Matters: Refugee Regimentations As Practices of Statecraft, supervised by Richard K. Ashley.

== Books ==
Soguk's books include:

- States and Strangers: Refugees and Displacements of Statecraft (University of Minnesota Press, 1999)
- Globalization and Islamism: Beyond Fundamentalism (Rowman & Littlefield, 2011)
- Arab Revolutions and World Transformations (edited with Anna M. Agathangelou, Routledge, 2013)
- The Ashgate Research Companion to Modern Theory, Modern Power, World Politics: Critical Investigations (edited with Scott G. Nelson, Routledge, 2016)
- Global Insurrectional Politics (edited, Routledge, 2018)

== Personal life ==
In 1992, Soguk married Clare Hanusz (1968–2023), an immigration lawyer whom he met when they were both students at Ohio University. They had two children.
