= Anfa =

Anfa Anfa / ⴰⵏⴼⴰ / أنفا
- District of Casablanca
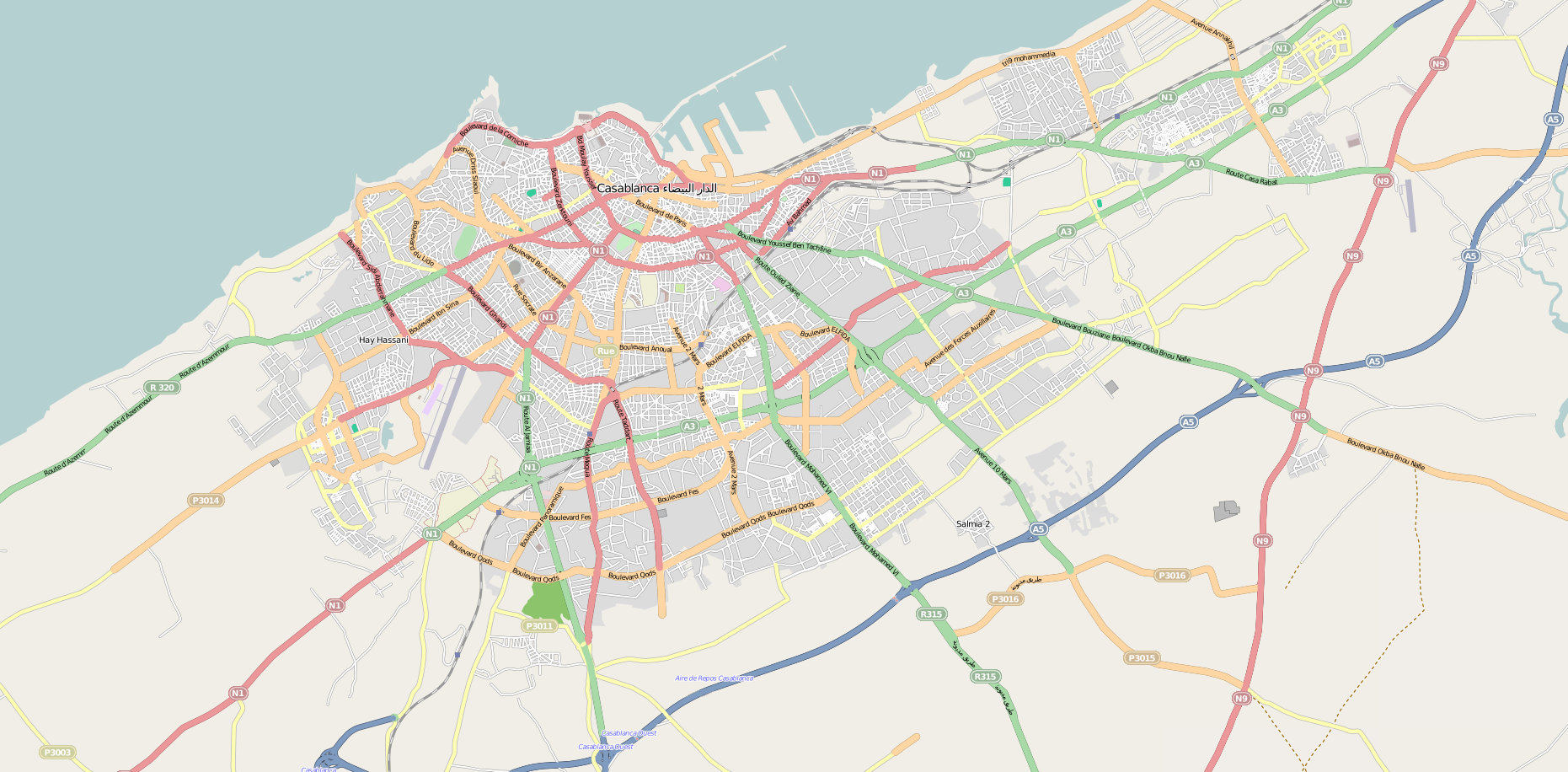
- Location in Greater Casablanca
- Coordinates: 33°35′18″N 7°38′31″W
- Country: Morocco
- Region: Casablanca-Settat

Area
  - Total: 37.5 km^{2} (14.5 sq mi)

Population (2024)
  - Total: 344.000
- Time zone: UTC+0 (WET)
  - Summer (DST): UTC+1 (WEST)

Anfa (Berber language: Anfa or Anaffa, ⴰⵏⴼⴰ; Arabic: أنفا) was the ancient toponym for Casablanca during the classical period. The city was founded by Berbers around the 10th century BC, with the Romans under Augustus later establishing the commercial port of "Anfus" in 15 BC. Anfa is now the name of a district in the oldest part of Casablanca, located in the Casablanca-Settat region of Morocco. The district covers an area of 37.5 square kilometres (14.5 square miles), and as of 2024 has 344.000 inhabitants.

== Roman Anfa ==
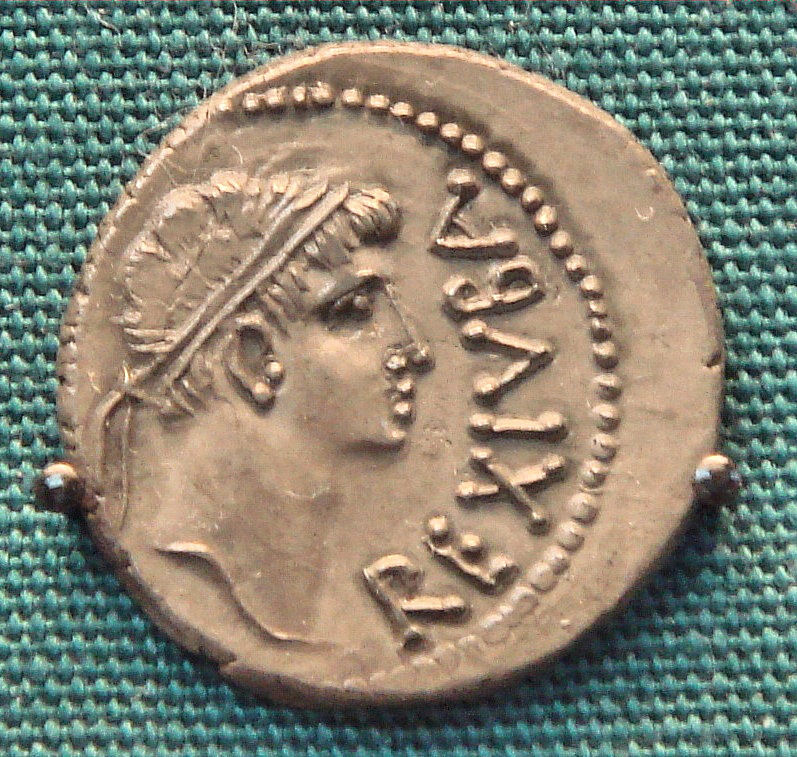
Roman coin of King Juba II similar to those found in the Anfa port

The area which is today Casablanca was founded and settled by the Berbers by about the 10th century BC. It was used as a port by the Phoenicians and later by the Romans.

Romans occupied the area in 15 BC and created a commercial port under Augustus, directly connected to the Mogador island in the Iles Purpuraires of southern Mauritania. From there they obtained a special dye, that colored the purple stripe in Imperial Roman Senatorial togas. The expedition of Juba II to discover the Canary Islands and Madeira probably departed from Anfa.

Anfa est une grande cité, edifiée par les Romans sur le rivage de la mer Oceane... (Leo Africanus: Anfa is a big city, built by the Romans on the ocean shore...)

The Roman port, probably called Anfus, was part of a Berber client state of Rome until Emperor Augustus. When Rome annexed Ptolemy of Mauretania's kingdom, Anfa was incorporated into the Roman Empire by Caligula. But this was done only nominally because the Roman limes was a few dozen kilometers north of the port (the Roman military fortifications of Mauretania Tingitana were just a few kilometers south of the Roman colonia named Sala Colonia). However, Roman Anfa—connected mainly by commerce and by socio-cultural ties to Volubilis (autonomous from Rome since 285 AD)—lasted until the 5th century, when Vandals conquered Roman northwestern Africa.

A Roman wreck of the 2nd century, from which were salvaged 169 silver coins, shows that the Romans appreciated this useful port for commerce. There is even evidence of oil commerce with Roman Volubilis and Tingis in the 3rd century.

Meanwhile, a large Berber tribe, the Berghouata, settled in the area between the rivers Bou Regreg to the north and Oum er-Rbia to the south of the Roman port. Consequently, the independent Berber kingdom called Barghawata, in the area then named Anfa, arose around in 744 AD, and continued until it was conquered by the new Berber kingdom of the Almoravids in 1068 AD.

Abou El Kassem El Ziani refers to ancient Casablanca as "Anfa" and stated that the Zenatiyins (Berber dynasty under Arab rule) were the first people that established Anfa in the period of their settlement in Tamassna.

Leo Africanus defined Anfa as a Roman city in his famous Della descrittione dell’Africa et delle cose notabili che ivi sono (Description of Africa), written in the 16th century.

== Modern history ==
Actual Anfa was originally built and settled by the Berbers in the Middle Ages. Anfa is a Berber name which means "the top". The area became an independent kingdom ruled by Barghawata from 744 CE until it was conquered by the Almoravids in 1068.

From the 14th century, under the Marinids, Anfa rose in importance as a port. In the early 15th century, the town became an independent state once again. It also became a safe harbour for pirates, which led to it being targeted by the Portuguese, who destroyed the town in 1468. It was used by the Portuguese, who called it Casablanca, as a military fortress from 1515.

Anfa is today to the west of central Casablanca, and was the name of one of the city's two airports before being closed in 2007. The region around Casablanca is named Casa-Anfa. The neighborhood of Anfa is the most upper-class and westernized in the city.

== Subdivisions ==
The district is divided into three arrondissements:

- Anfa (أنفا)
- Maârif (المعاريف)
- Sidi Belyout (سيدي بليوط)

== See also ==
- Casablanca
- Timeline of Casablanca
