= International Political Sociology (journal) =

- Discipline: International relations
- Language: English
- Edited by: Debbie Lisle; Roxanne Doty; Vicki Squire; Alex Hall

Publication details
- History: 2007-present
- Publisher: Oxford University Press for the International Studies Association
- Frequency: Quarterly
- Impact factor: 2.438 (2020)

Standard abbreviations
- ISO 4: Int. Polit. Sociol.
- NLM: Int Political Sociol

Indexing
- ISSN: 1749-5679 (print); 1749-5687 (web)
- LCCN: 2007242154
- OCLC no.: 85852647

Links
- Journal homepage; Online access

International Political Sociology is a peer-reviewed academic journal. Its aim is to publish and disseminate world-leading research that critically explores the problems of the modern international. It welcomes analyses of local, global and international transformations that challenge statist understandings of our world, and encourages research that creatively re-works the constitutive dichotomies holding our world together (e.g. state and society, national and international, social and political). It also seeks to develop the already established connections between International Relations (IR), Politics and Sociology by fostering transdisciplinary collaborations between scholars in other disciplines who are critically interrogating the international sphere (e.g. Human Geographers, Anthropologists, and Political Theorists). Finally, it seeks to broaden the community that engages with international studies beyond the usual circuits of North American and European scholarship so as to better reflect the diverse populations constituting the global realm.

It attempts to promote interaction between international relations scholars and disciplines such as sociology. Past editors-in-chief have been Didier Bigo and R.B.J. Walker, Jef Huysmans and João Pontes Nogueira. Since 2017, the Editor-in-Chief is Debbie Lisle with Co-Editors Vicki Squire, Roxanne Doty and Alex Hall.

According to the Journal Citation Reports, the journal has a 2016 impact factor of 1.952, ranking it 37th out of 165 journals in the category "Political Science" and 23rd out of 143 in the category "Sociology".
