= Articulo (journal) =

- Discipline: Social sciences
- Language: English, French
- Edited by: Laurent Matthey

Publication details
- History: 2005–present
- Publisher: Association Journal of Urban Research (France)
- Frequency: Biannually
- Open access: Yes

Standard abbreviations
- ISO 4: Articulo

Indexing
- ISSN: 1661-4941
- OCLC no.: 464691469

Links
- Journal homepage

Articulo – Journal of Urban Research is a peer-reviewed academic journal covering urban issues and publishes both theoretical and empirical articles. It is abstracted and indexed in several online directories, including Scopus, the French Evaluation Agency for Research and Higher Education (AERES), and Intute. Articulo is hosted by Revues.org, a platform for journals in the humanities and social sciences run by the Centre for Open Electronic Publishing and several academic institutions in France. Articulo publishes thematic issues, book reviews and conference proceedings. Papers are published in English or French.

The journal operates under a Creative Commons license, providing open access to all its articles and allowing free distribution with proper attribution. It also publishes special thematic issues that address contemporary urban challenges such as sustainable development, urban inequality, and digital transformation.
