= Cultures et Conflits =

International relations journal

- Type: Scientific journal
- Publisher: L'Harmattan
- Managing editor: Didier Bigo
- Founded: 1990
- Language: French
- City: Paris
- Country: France
- Circulation: Electronic and paper (as of 2007)
- ISSN: 1777-5345
- Website: http://www.conflits.org

Cultures et Conflits is an international relations journal associated with the Paris School of security studies. It is a quarterly international relations journal that addresses various issues, including topics of war, conflict, migration, refugees, and human rights. Submissions to the journal are open to a range of professions, such as sociologists, philosophers, political science theorists, historians, anthropologists, geographers, and those with institutional or NGO affiliation. The journal is led by Didier Bigo and is primarily written in French, but also occasionally has publications written in English and Spanish.

The journal is accessible via their website: www.conflits.org, now redirected to their page on OpenEdition Journals. The site provides access to all of their publications, as well as files and supplements (unpublished articles, iconographic documents, supporting documents, links to other sites, etc.).

Cultures et Confits is available in full text on revues.org, now OpenEdition Journals, without time restrictions. The journal is powered by the free CMS Lodel. Publications are also available on the publisher's website for purchase.
