= Inlac =

Inlac The International Institute for Languages and Cultures
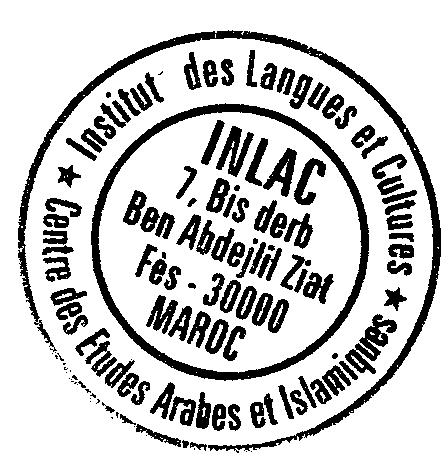
- Inlac Institute
- Motto: Excellence and Professional Development
- Established: September 1, 2011
- Location: Fez medina (Morocco)
- Website: www.inlac-institute.com

The International Institute for Languages and Cultures, Fès, Morocco (INLAC) is a private institute for teaching and learning Arabic, located in the old city (medina) of Fez. It offers undergraduate and graduate credit programs.

INLAC activities focus on Arabic, Islam, gender, history, and cultures of the Middle East and North Africa. It is an interdisciplinary institute accredited by the Moroccan Ministry of Education.

INLAC has developed partnership and exchange programs with Moroccan, European, and US colleges and universities, namely Minnesota University Northeastern, Whittier College, Lewis and Clark, New Haven University, Maryland University, University of Utah.

INLAC adopts an integrative strategy whereby courses, seminars, volunteer work, and university auditing are combined. It organizes workshops, luncheon seminars, and other forums to highlight new perspectives on the Middle East and North Africa. The events showcase research carried out by both established and younger scholars and foster discussion of current events and policy issues relating to the region. Students are expected to participate actively in the learning experience.

== The city of Fez ==
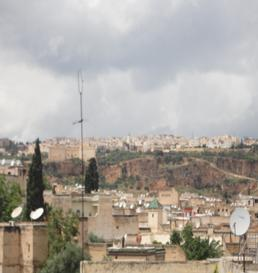
The old medina of Fez

The city of Fez is a historical city, which is home to ancient Islamic monuments, bazaars, gates, gardens, fountains, restaurants, and festivals, all of which inviting inter-cultural and educational exchanges. Fez is a spiritual city, with many ethnicities, religious sites, and Sufi orders.

== INLAC co-founders ==
INLAC was founded in 2011 by Moroccan academics and university professors, Fatimae Sadiqi and Moha Ennaji. They both completed their undergraduate studies in Morocco before accomplishing their Master's and Ph.D. degrees in Great Britain. While teaching at the university of Fez and travelling the world, they realized the urgency of intercultural dialogue and the importance of educating the young generation and of research in the MENA region. They are aware of the need for communication between civilizations and societies, especially the youth of the Islamic World and the United States. INLAC was founded as a structured forum for such a communication through both academic and cultural channels.

== Courses ==
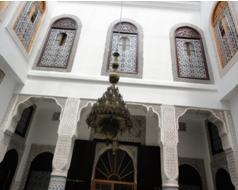
Inside view of Inlac

INLAC hosts study abroad programs (year-long, semester and short-term programs) which include content courses and language courses, namely Arabic, French and Berber. The main components of the programs are: intensive Arabic classes, content courses on Islam, Gender, and Middle Eastern and North African culture, and area studies. INLAC facilitates homestays with Moroccan families to provide students with the opportunity to experience family life in Morocco.

== Admissions ==
INLAC admits students throughout the year. it does not provide financial aid at this time but encourages prospective students to apply for federal and state grants and loans at their university.

== Cultural Activities ==
Cultural activities such as NGO visits and internships, excursions and recreation are part of cross-cultural education. Students are required to do volunteer work with local NGOs and the community at large that focus on local issues, such as youth, sports, development, and women concerns. Allowing students to associate themselves with charities and non-profit causes facilitates their professional routes.
