= World politics =

The terms "world politics" or "global politics" may refer to:

- Geopolitics, the study of the effects of geography on politics and International Relations (IR)
- Global politics, a discipline of political science which focuses on political globalization, away from the dominant state-centric theories of politics and IR
- World Politics, a journal of political science and IR

== See also ==
- Weltpolitik (translates into English as "world politics")
