= Didier Bigo =

French academic

Didier Bigo (born 31 August 1956) is a French academic from Lille and Professor of International Relations at King's College London and at Sciences Po, Paris. He has authored two books, Polices en réseaux. L'expérience européenne (1996) and Pouvoir et obéissance en Centrafrique (1988) and has been the editor for many others.

He co-founded, with R. B. J. Walker, the peer-reviewed academic journal, International Political Sociology and is the director of the French journal, Cultures et Conflits. He is considered one of the leading academics within the Paris School of security studies, and a founding figure of the International Political Sociology research programme.

== Boundaries, Limits, Securities ==
Bigo's work has profoundly impacted the study of borders and boundaries, especially where discussions of the 'field of security' and the security 'ban-opticon' are concerned. Speaking broadly, his work considers the functional and de-localized dimensions of state borders as they are practiced and enforced within and beyond the territorial jurisdictions of states. In assessing the link between security and borders, one author commends Bigo's work for "exploring the increasing intertwinement between internal and external security through an analysis of policing. Whereas formerly the realms of the police and the military had very little in common, Bigo points to the ways in which it is increasingly difficult to differentiate between the two. This does not lead to an erasure of the inside/outside distinction, however, but rather to its reworking."
