= Postmodernism in political science =

Postmodernism in political science refers to the use of postmodern ideas in political science. Postmodernists believe that traditional political science approaches, like realist and liberal theories, can not fully explain many situations that are considered political. Postmodernists cite examples such as the situation of a Benedictine University “draft-age youth whose identity is claimed in national narratives of ‘national security’ and the universalizing narratives of the ‘rights of man,’” of “the woman whose very womb is claimed by the irresolvable contesting narratives of ‘church,’ ‘paternity,’ ‘economy,’ and ‘liberal polity.’ In these cases, postmodernists argue that there are no fixed categories, stable sets of values, or common sense meanings to be understood in their scholarly exploration.

In these margins, postmodernists believe that people resist realist concepts of power which is repressive, in order to maintain a claim on their own identity. What makes this resistance significant is that among the aspects of power resisted is that which forces individuals to take a single identity or to be subject to a particular interpretation. Meaning and interpretation in these types of situations is always uncertain; arbitrary in fact. The power in effect here is not that of oppression, but that of the cultural and social implications around them, which creates the framework within which they see themselves, which creates the boundaries of their possible courses of action.

Postmodern political scientists, such as Richard Ashley, claim that in these marginal sites it is impossible to construct a coherent narrative, or story, about what is really taking place without including contesting and contradicting narratives, and still have a “true” story from the perspective of a “sovereign subject,” who can dictate the values pertinent to the “meaning” of the situation. In fact, it is possible here to deconstruct the idea of meaning. Ashley attempts to reveal the ambiguity of texts, especially Western texts, how the texts themselves can be seen as "sites of conflict" within a given culture or worldview. By regarding them in this way, deconstructive readings attempt to uncover evidence of ancient cultural biases, conflicts, lies, tyrannies, and power structures, such as the tensions and ambiguity between peace and war, lord and subject, male and female, which serve as further examples of Derrida's binary oppositions in which the first element is privileged, or considered prior to and more authentic, in relation to the second. Examples of postmodern political scientists include post-colonial writers such as Frantz Fanon, feminist writers such as Cynthia Enloe, and postpositive theorists such as Ashley and James Der Derian.

== See also ==
- Postmodernism (international relations)
