= Café Hafa =

Moroccan cafe

Coordinates: 35.7915°N 5.8218°W

Café Hafa

Café Hafa (Arabic: مقهى الحافة) is a cafe in Tangier, Morocco, located along the cliff top overlooking the Bay of Tangier. Opened in 1921, the cafe still maintains its original decor with multiple levels of terrace seating, facing the Strait of Gibraltar with Tarifa, Spain visible in the distance.

Famous past visitors have included Paul Bowles, William S. Burroughs, Juan Goytisolo, Sean Connery, The Beatles, and the Rolling Stones.

The Spanish musician Luis Eduardo Aute wrote the song "Hafa Café" about the venue, on his 1992 album Slowly.
