= International political sociology =

Study of country relations and human society

International political sociology (IPS) is an interdisciplinary field and set of approaches at the crossroads of international relations theory and other disciplines such as sociology, geography and anthropology. It is structured around initiatives such as the journal International Political Sociology and the network Doingips, as well as scholars such as Didier Bigo, Anastassia Tsoukala, Ayse Ceyhan or Elspeth Guild.

== Security studies ==
The IPS approach to security studies is often also referred to as Paris School of security studies within the discipline, and is closely associated with the journal Cultures et Conflits. According to Didier Bigo an IPS approach to security argues that both security and insecurity are the result of an (in)securitization process based on a speech act calling for a politics of exception and a general frame linked to the existence of transnational bureaucracies and private agents managing insecurity that compete to frame security issues. Bigo further argues that this (in)securitization process is embedded in the use of technology in every day practices. IPS approaches to security criticize of the characterization of security studies as a sub-discipline of international relations and the association of security with survival. IPS challenges the Copenhagen School's understanding of the securitization process arguing that securitization is not the result of a successful speech act but mundane bureaucratic decisions, use of technologies and Weberian routines of rationalization. The International Political Sociology approach to security is particularly influenced by a Foucaultian reading of policing as a form of governmentality, as well as insights from the work of Pierre Bourdieu.

The "sociology of security" is the scientific study of the relationships between community and security. It addresses the questions what understanding of security does society create and conversely, what society does security establish. In other words, sociology of security is the study of mutual interactions between security and the society that result in developing or production and reproduction of security in the society.

== See also ==
- Critical security studies
