= Imperial cities of Morocco =

Four historical capital cities

The Imperial Cities of Morocco are the four historical capital cities of Morocco:

- Fez
- Marrakesh
- Meknes
- Rabat

Morocco's current capital city is Rabat and has been since 1912.

== Fez ==
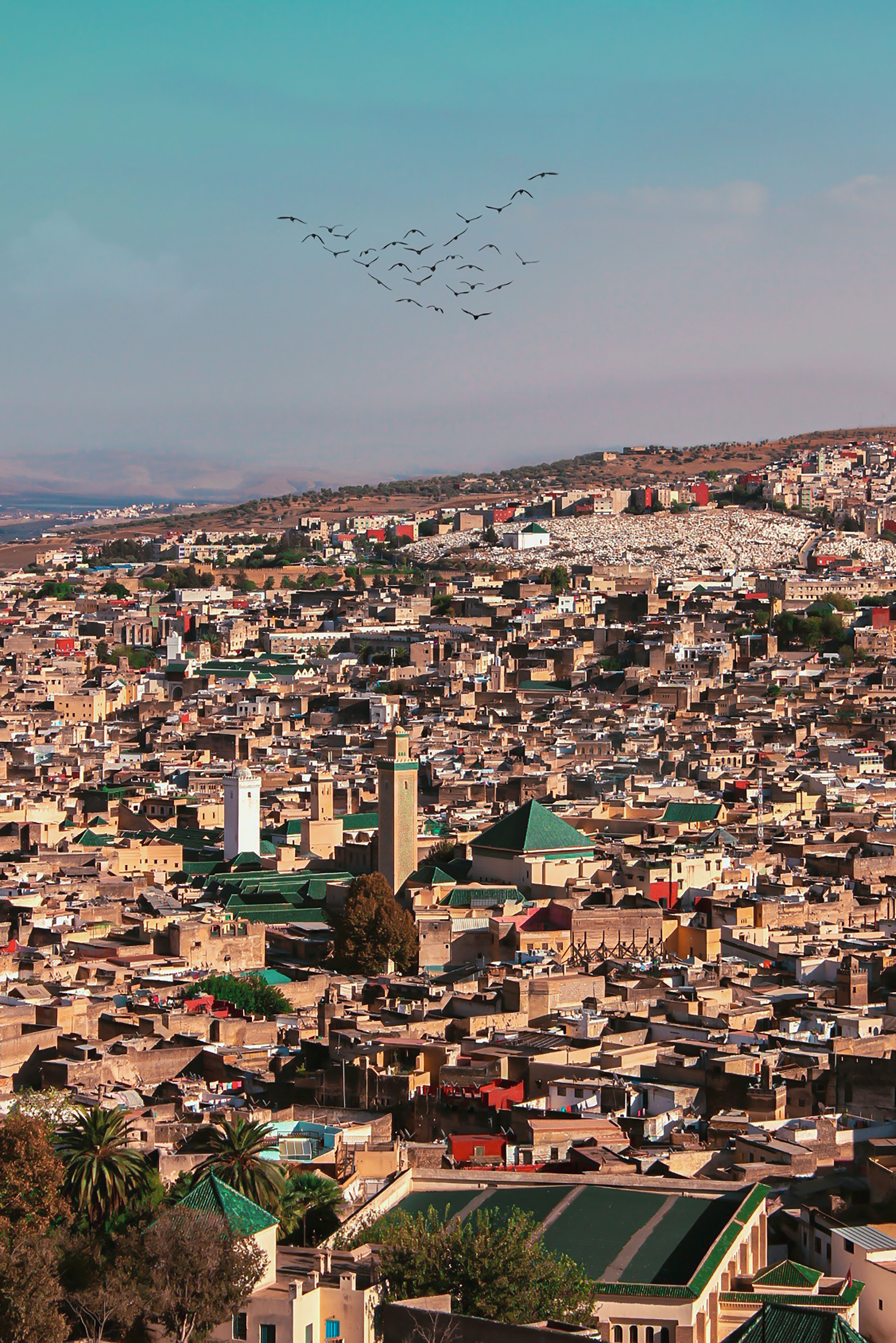
Aerial image of City of Fez in 2020.

Fez was founded and built up from 789 to 808 by both Idris I and Idris II. During Idris I's reign the city mainly existed on the right side of the Oued Fes riverbank, after he [Idris I] passed and Idris II took control and expanded into the left side of the riverbank.

Fez was the capital city several times:

- under the Idrisid dynasty, from the beginning of the 9th century to 974;
- under the Marinid dynasty, from 1244 to 1465;
- during the 15th century Idrisid interlude, from 1465 to 1471;
- under the Wattasid dynasty, from 1471 to 1554;
- under the Saadi dynasty, from 1603 to 1627;
- during the 17th century Dila'ite interlude, from 1659 to 1663;
- under the Alawi dynasty, from 1666 to 1672 and from 1727 to 1912.

== Marrakesh ==
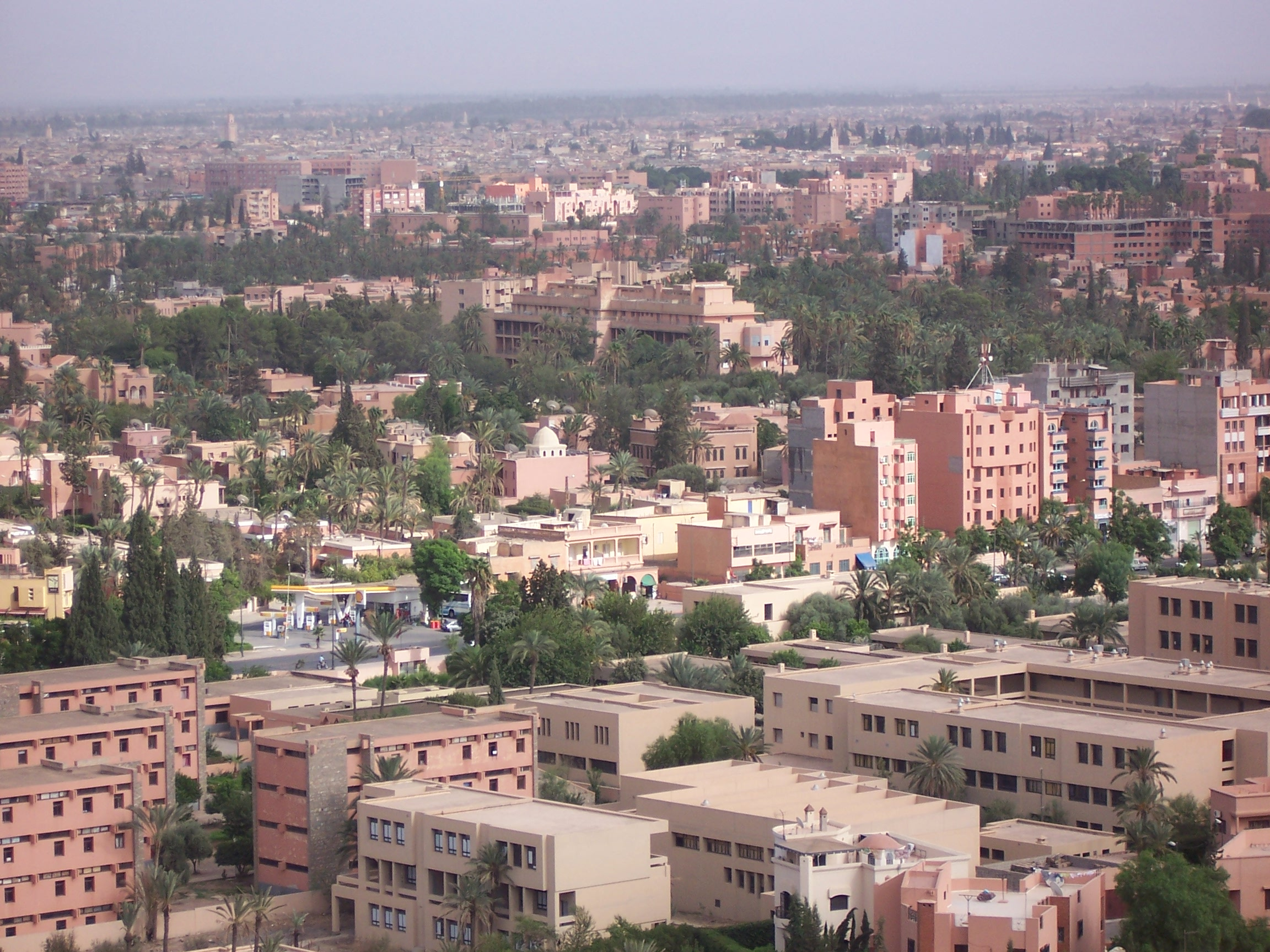
View of Marrakesh in 2004

Marrakesh, the first of the four imperial cities, is considered a symbol of Morocco and the power of the Almoravid and Almohad dynasties. It was founded in 1070/71 by Yusuf ibn Tashufin and became the capital for the two following centuries. In the 16th century Marrakesh was used by the 'Alawites as a military post.

Marrakesh was the capital city for:

- the Almoravid dynasty, from 1071 to 1147;
- the Almohad dynasty, from 1147 to 1244;
- the Saadi dynasty, as princes of Tagmadert from 1511 to 1554 and as sultans of Morocco from 1554 to 1659.

== Meknes ==
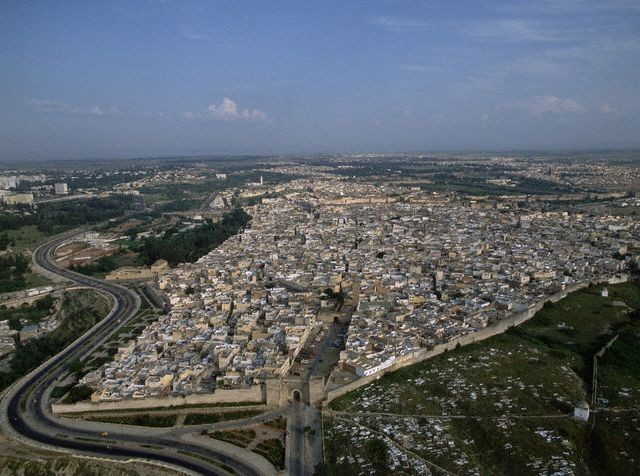
Aerial view of Meknes.

Meknes was founded by the Zanatah tribe, a subgroup of the Meknassa Imazighen Berbers, in the 10th century. Originally named Meknassa al- Zaytun ("Meknes of the Olives"), Meknes was the capital city in 1673 under the rule of Mawlay Isma'il who built several mosques and palaces as well as fortifying the cities walls.

== Rabat ==
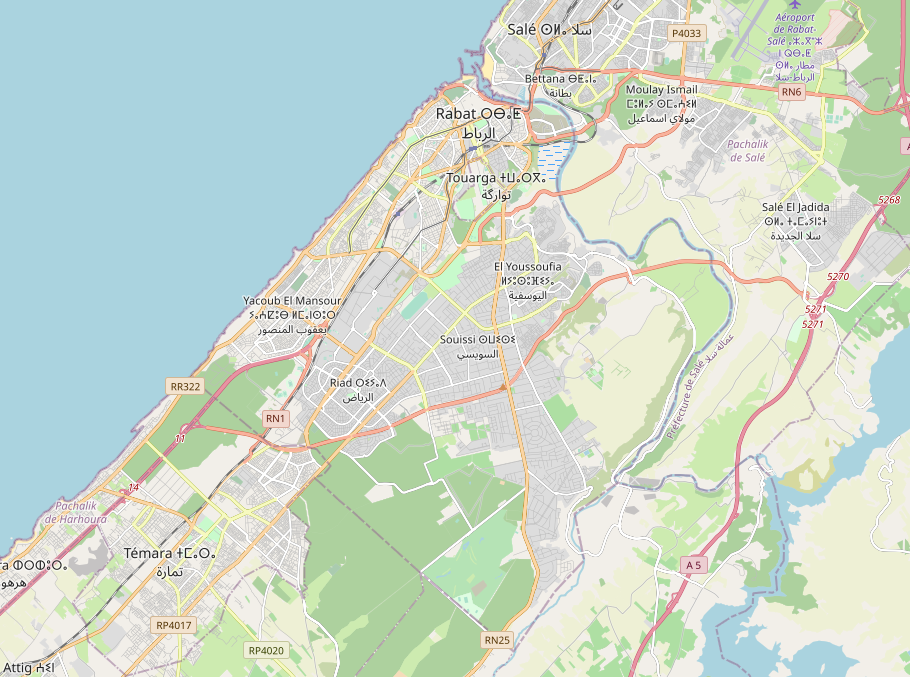
Map of Rabat

Rabat was founded in the 12th century, by the Almohad caliph Yaqub al-Mansur with the aim of serving as his capital, but the project was abandoned after he died and Marrakesh remained the capital city.

In the 18th century, Rabat was designated an imperial city by the Alawi sultan Muhammad ibn Abdallah, who built the Dar al-Makhzen, although he did not designate any city as his capital, moving continually between Rabat, Fez and Marrakech.
