= Association Internationale des Maires Francophones =

The Association Internationale des Maires Francophones (est. 1979) is an international organization of mayors of cities in French-speaking countries, headquartered in Paris.

== Presidents ==
- Jacques Chirac, 1979-1995
- Jean Tiberi, 1995-2001
- Bertrand Delanoë, 2001-2014
- Anne Hidalgo, 2014-present

== Assemblée générale ==
The association holds annual meetings.

Number	Place	Continent	Year
1	Quebec City	North America	1979
2	Rabat and Casablanca	Africa	1982
3	Paris	Europe	1983
4	Quebec City and Montreal	North America	1984
5	Kinshasa	Africa	1985
6	Casablanca	Africa	1986
7	Brazzaville	Africa	1987
8	Lyon	Europe	1988
9	Libreville	Africa	1989
10	Tunis	Africa	1990
11	Bordeaux	Europe	1991
12	Montreal	North America	1992
13	Port-Louis	Africa	1993
14	Casablanca	Africa	1994
15	Aosta	Europe	1995
16	Brazzaville	Africa	1996
17	Brussels	Europe	1997
18	Beirut	Asia	1998
19	Quebec City	North America	1999
20	Paris	Europe	2000
21	Casablanca	Africa	2001
22	Beirut	Asia	2002
23	Dakar	Africa	2003
24	Ouagadougou	Africa	2004
25	Antananarivo	Africa	2005
26	Bucharest	Europe	2006
27	Hué	Asia	2007
28	Quebec City	North America	2008
29	Paris	Europe	2009
30	Lausanne	Europe	2010
31	Yerevan	Asia/Europe	2011
32	Abidjan	Africa	2012
33	Paris	Europe	2013
34	Kinshasa	Africa	2014
35	Tunis	Africa	2015
36	Beirut	Asia	2016

== See also ==
- Organisation internationale de la Francophonie
- United States Conference of Mayors
