= Alternatives: Global, Local, Political =

Alternatives
- Discipline: Political science, international relations
- Language: English
- Edited by: Lacin Idil Oztig

Publication details
- History: 1975–present
- Publisher: SAGE Publications
- Frequency: Quarterly
- Impact factor: 1.095 (2020)

Standard abbreviations
- ISO 4: Alternatives

Indexing
- ISSN: 0304-3754
- LCCN: 76913317
- OCLC no.: 442954314

Links
- Journal homepage; Online access; Online archive

Alternatives: Global, Local, Political is a peer-reviewed academic journal that covers the field of international relations. The journal's editor-in-chief is Lacin Idil Oztig (Yıldız Technical University). It has been in publication since 1975 and is published by SAGE Publications in association with the Centre for the Study of Developing Societies.

== Abstracting and indexing ==
The journal is abstracted and indexed in Scopus and the Social Sciences Citation Index. According to the Journal Citation Reports, its 2020 impact factor is 1.095.

== Controversy ==
In 2020, the journal published a controversial journal article claiming that "International Relations (IR) scholars uncritically accept the official narrative regarding the events of 9/11 and refuse to examine the massive body of evidence generated by the 9/11 truth movement." A number of scholars reacted on social media to criticize the claims made in the abstract, the editor's decision to publish, and the editorial board's silence. In a public statement addressing this controversy, the editor of Alternatives defended the publication of the article and asserted that academic critics offered no substantive rebuttals of any of its points but merely acted as "playground bully" on Twitter in advocating or demanding the article's retraction, censure of the journal's editorial board, or boycotting SAGE Publications, rather than issuing appropriately substantive criticisms about the content of a peer-reviewed article in a legitimate academic manner.
