= Le Petit Futé =

French travel guides

Petit Futé (founded 1976) is a series of French travel guides broadly equivalent to the Lonely Planet series in English or the competing French 'Guides du routard' series. The series also publishes some works in English, such as Petit Futé Best of France. The term petit futé means "little wily one," implying in this case for the wily and cost-conscious traveller, and the imprint's logo is a (wily) fox.
