= Poststructuralism (international relations) =

Poststructuralism in international relations is an approach that has been part of international relations scholarship since the 1980s. Although there are various strands of thinking, a key element to postmodernist theories is a distrust of any account of human life which claims to have direct access to the truth. Postmodern international relations theory critiques theories like Marxism that provide an overarching metanarrative to history. Key postmodern thinkers include Jean-François Lyotard, Michel Foucault, and Jacques Derrida.

== See also ==
- Postmodernism in political science
