= Centre pour l'Édition Électronique Ouverte =

Centre for Open Electronic Publishing

The Centre pour l'Édition Électronique Ouverte (CLEO, Cléo; transl. Centre for Open Electronic Publishing), based in Marseille, France, is overseen by Aix-Marseille University, the Centre National de la Recherche Scientifique, School for Advanced Studies in the Social Sciences, and University of Avignon and the Vaucluse. It produces the open access academic publishing portal OpenEdition.org, which includes platforms Calenda, Hypotheses, OpenEdition Books, and OpenEdition Journals. OpenEdition focuses on publications in the academic fields of humanities and social sciences. The centre also issues a blog about open access.

== OpenEdition Books ==
include:

- Bak-Geller, Sarah (28 July 2022). "Patrimonio alimentario y ciudadanía indígena. El caso coca de Mezcala, Jalisco (México)". In Rebaï, Nasser; Bilhaut, Anne-Gaël; de Suremain, Charles-Édouard; Katz, Esther; Paredes, Myriam (eds.). Patrimonios alimentarios en América Latina : Recursos locales, actores y globalización (in Spanish). IRD Éditions. pp. 191–214. ISBN 978-2-7099-2943-1 – via Centre pour l'Édition Électronique Ouverte. Introducción

== OpenEdition Journals ==
The following list includes some examples of titles in Journals.openedition.org (prior to December 2017 known as Revues.org):

A

- Afriques: Débats, Méthodes et Terrains d'Histoire (ISSN 2108-6796, Centre d'études des mondes africains)
- Agone
- Ambiances
- Amnis: Revue d'études des sociétés et cultures contemporaines Europe-Amérique
- Annales de Bretagne et des pays de l'Ouest
- Annales historiques de la Révolution française
- Annuaire de l'École pratique des hautes études, section des sciences religieuses
- Annuaire de l'École pratique des hautes études. Section des sciences historiques et philologiques
- Annuaire du Collège de France
- Anthropology of food
- Apparence(s)
- Articulo – Journal of Urban Research
- L'Atelier du Centre des recherches historiques

B

- Balkanologie
- Bulletin de l'APAD
- Bulletin de méthodologie sociologique
- Bulletin du Centre de recherche français de Jérusalem

C

- Cahiers d'Études africaines
- Cahiers de la Méditerranée
- Cahiers d'Outre-Mer
- Cahiers de l'URMIS
- Cahiers du centre de recherches historiques
- China Perspectives (Perspectives chinoises)
- Chroniques yéménites
- Clio. Femmes, genre, histoire
- Commonwealth Essays and Studies
- Cultures et Conflits
- Current Psychology Letters
- Cybergeo

D

- Développement durable et territoires
- Diacronie (ISSN 2038-0925)
- Discours

E

- Économie publique
- Éducation relative à l'environnement
- Encyclopédie berbère
- Enquête
- L'Espace politique
- Espace populations sociétés
- Études arméniennes contemporaines (2013–)
- Études de communication
- European Journal of American Studies

F

- Field Actions Science Reports
- Finance-contrôle-stratégie

G

- Genre & Histoire
- Géomorphologie: Relief, Processus, Environnement
- Gradhiva

H

- Histoire de l'éducation
- L'Homme

I

- Insaniyat / إنسانيات (ISSN 2253-0738, Centre de recherche en anthropologie sociale et culturelle, Algeria)

J

- Journal de la Société des Américanistes
- Journal de la Société des océanistes
- Journal des africanistes

L

- Lexis – Journal in English Lexicology

M

- Médiévales
- Méditerranée
- Methodos
- Métropoles

N

- Noesis
- Norois
- Nuevo Mundo, Mundos Nuevos

O

- Oliviana

P

- Paléo
- Physio-Géo
- Pratiques|Pratiques
- Le Portique

Q

- Quaderni (ISSN 2105-2956, Éditions de la Maison des sciences de l’homme)
- Quaternaire
- Questions de communication

R

- Recherches sociologiques et anthropologiques
- Revue française des sciences de l’information et de la communication (ISSN 2263-0856)
- Revue de géographie alpine
- Revue d'histoire du XIXe siècle
- Revue de l'histoire des religions
- Revue des mondes musulmans et de la Méditerranée
- La Revue pour l'histoire du CNRS
- Rives méditerranéennes
- Rives nord-méditerranéennes

S

- S.A.P.I.E.N.S
- Semen
- Sillages critiques
- Sociétés et jeunesses en difficulté
- SociologieS
- Strates

T

- Techniques & Culture
- Terrain
- Transatlantica: Revue d’études américaines (American Studies Journal) ISSN 1765-2766

V

- Variations (revue): Revue internationale de théorie critique
- VertigO (ISSN 1492-8442, Montreal)
- Volume!

== See also ==
- OpenEdition access via Wikipedia Library
- Open access journal
- Open access in France
- List of academic databases and search engines

== Bibliography ==
- Jean-Christophe Peyssard (2011), OpenEdition Freemium: developing a sustainable library-centered economic model for open access (PDF), International Federation of Library Associations and Institutions
- Open Access Rules in France: Persée, érudit, and revues.org. USA: Villanova University. 2012 – via Falvey Library Blogs: History & Political Science.
