= Feminist peace research =

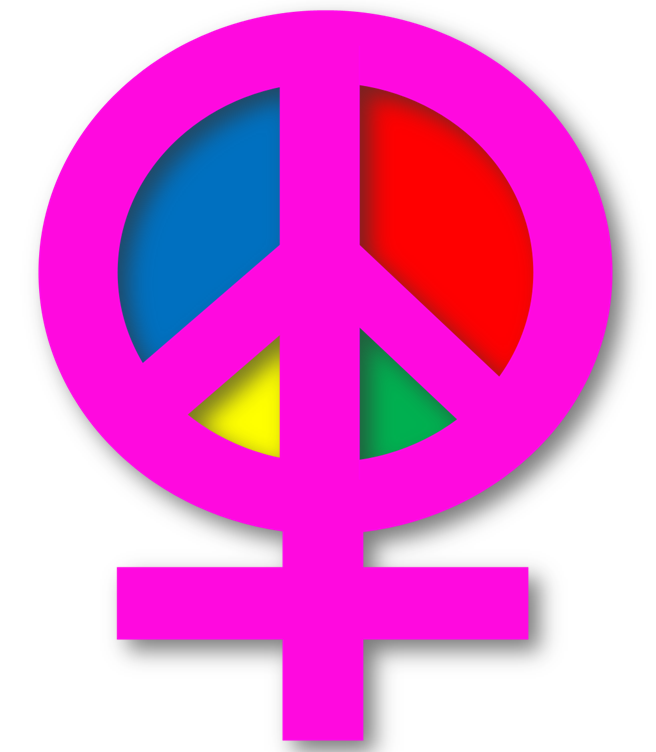
The symbol for feminist peace, a peace sign combined with the female gender symbol.

Feminist peace research uses a feminist framework to expand on conventional peace research practices, examining the roles of gender and other power structures to conceptualize and actively build peace with justice. Feminist peace research understands peace and violence to be interwoven and ongoing processes that occur at many scales, and points to how these scales are interconnected. While gender is the dominant lens through which processes of peace and violence are analyzed, this research seeks to address the ways in which other intersecting systems of power, such as race, class, sexuality, and disability, among many others, further complicate these dynamics.

== Feminist analysis ==
Feminist peace research is rooted in feminist analysis, which examines how dynamics of gender manifest within systems of power, often including as they relate to peace and violence. The ultimate aim of the work done by feminist researchers and scholars is gender justice, in which gender equity is an intrinsic component. In pursuit of this, feminist research is normative, evaluating and critiquing while simultaneously advocating for alternatives for improvement. These goals are complementary to those of peace research more broadly, which likewise takes a normative approach as it seeks to eliminate all kinds of violence.

Within feminist peace research, it is emphasized that peace is a continuous process rather than an end point to be reached. Peace is "constantly in the making," as described by Wibben et al., as it is always underway and materializing uniquely within different contexts. As such, feminist peace research distrusts the idea that there are any universal truths about peacebuilding, and understands that applications of peace cannot be effective when prescribed by a detached, external source. Instead, it stresses, the process of building peace must involve those directly impacted by the violences being addressed. The idea of positive peace is particularly emphasized, whereby the focus is on peace with justice, rather than peace only through the absence of war (known as negative peace). Feminism views violence (as well as peace) as existing and interconnected at many scales, addressing both the day-to-day as well as the larger-scale, "spectacular" experiences of violence.

Feminist peace researchers also make note of the common gendered misperceptions of peace and peacebuilding, which are often labeled as "feminine" and thus discredited in comparison to the positive, masculine associations with war and violence. Efforts toward justice and equality within feminism are not only for women; the examination of the gendered dynamics of peace and violence includes addressing the experiences of all genders.

=== Feminism and peace research ===
Feminist peace research had a notable surge in the mid-1970s, with peace researchers and feminists becoming increasingly aware that the practices of the other could bolster their work. With this, feminist activist work within peace studies gradually expanded, largely through the evolution of the field of feminist security studies that would continue into the mid-2000s. This occurred simultaneously with the passing of the landmark United Nations Security Council Resolution (UNSCR) 1325 in 2000. UNSCR 1325 was the first of its kind to directly address women's experiences with conflict, as it acknowledged the intrinsically gendered components of war and violence, and it supported the influx of feminist scholarship and involvement in peace studies. In 2021, the field of feminist peace research was given notable recognition through the publication of the first handbook on the subject, the Routledge Handbook of Feminist Peace Research.

=== Gender and intersectionality ===
The understanding of gender in the context of feminist peace research is fluid and multi-layered; gender is not a static identity, but is continually under the influence of other intersectional factors such as race, class, and sexual orientation. Feminists underscore the ways in which these intersections influence and compound one another within both violence and peace, and accordingly assess how to confront their interlocking systems of power. It is also through this framework that feminist scholarship prioritizes the integration of "stories in the margins," a phrase used widely across feminist peace research that stresses the importance of concern for and involvement of all women, not just those in dominant identity groups. In this pursuit, those most impacted by issues are able to have an active role in addressing and finding solutions for them, with their insights made an essential part of the process.

In its dissection of intersectional experiences, some feminist peace research also highlights queer analysis as an essential component for examining violence and power, and calls attention to the failure of conventional peace research to do so. This research acknowledges an inseparable overlap between the analysis of gendered hierarchies and conventional ideas about sex and sexuality, as both serve to uphold binary notions of identity. The inclusion of queer analysis reveals the influence of sexuality in peace and conflict as much as a feminist analysis points to the influence of gender, and some feminist peace work deems it necessary to prioritize both for a thorough understanding of the impacts of each of those dynamics.

=== Scales of violence and peace ===
A key feminist argument foundational for feminist peace research is that violence and peace are not mutually exclusive, but coexist and influence one another at various scales. As much as violence can exist at the "spectacular" level, as seen with wars and other inter- and intrastate conflict, it too is present in the everyday, and these experiences are often interrelated. Likewise, the same is true for experiences of peace. Feminist scholars often refer to the image of a "continuum" of violence and peace to demonstrate this point and challenge the perception of a dichotomy between the two. The classic feminist slogan "the personal is political" connects to this framing, illustrating the intertwining nature of what has conventionally been viewed as separate public and private spheres with regard to experiences of violence.

=== Research processes ===
The methodologies for feminist peace research are primarily ethnographic, prioritizing relationship building between the researchers and the research participants as a means of countering the pervasiveness of power dynamics within conventional research processes. The ethnographic approach centralizes the agency of the participants, allowing the process to become a collaborative effort that builds community while simultaneously gathering important data and insights.

Another component key to addressing power relations within the research process is reflexivity on the part of the researchers. Feminist peace researchers make a conscientious effort to reflect on their own positions of power and privilege and how that may manifest within their research, understanding that they themselves can contribute to violence (or peace) through the way in which they engage with their work. It is through this awareness of power that stories from the margins continue to be foregrounded, as research hierarchies are actively destabilized. A new book series focusing on this sort of work is the Edinburgh University Press series Feminist Studies on Peace, Violence and Justice.

== Notable groups and people ==
=== Women's International League for Peace and Freedom (WILPF) ===
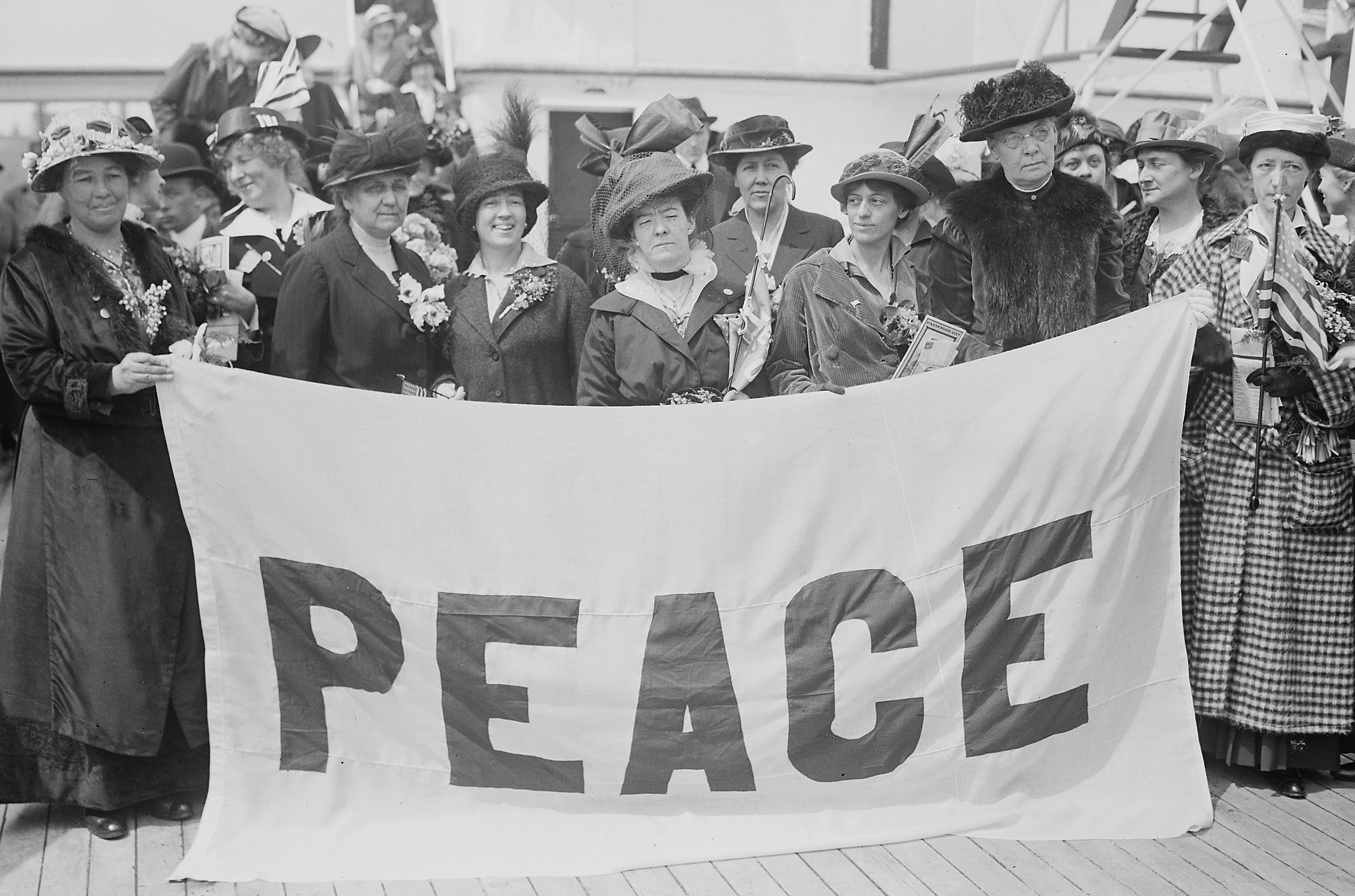
Image from the 1915 International Congress of Women that took place at the Hague, the Netherlands. Featured are American delegates Jane Addams, Annie E. Molloy, and Mary Heaton Vorse, Also present were Emily Greene Balch, Alice Hamilton, and Lillian G. Kohlhamer, among others.

The Women's International League for Peace and Freedom (WILPF) is a foundational organization in feminist peace research that pushes for disarmament as a necessity for peace. The organization originated in opposition to World War I, with its founding women members meeting at the International Congress of Women. Since its inception, WILPF has argued that it is impossible for true peace to exist amidst the presence and usage of arms. This baseline argument evolved into several current campaigns for disarmament, a push for greater UN representation of women, condemnation of nuclear power, and many other efforts. WILPF has been fundamental in bringing attention to the entangled relations of peace, disarmament, and dynamics of gender in the arms race; it has stressed that this perspective is equally as important as scientific and legal analyses of the issue.

=== Feminist Peace Research Network (FPRN) ===
The Feminist Peace Research Network (FPRN) is an international network of feminist peace scholars that addresses the limitations of conventional peace studies, pointing to how feminism can be used to develop and expand the field. FPRN works to highlight the power imbalances and exclusions inherent in much of peacebuilding, specifically stressing the impacts of those dynamics on the quality of the work being done. Created in 2016, the network currently includes over eighty feminist scholars and activists, and is continuing to grow. Tiina Vaittinen was instrumental in founding this network.

=== Elise Boulding ===
Elise Boulding is notable particularly for her foundational role in the establishment of the International Peace Association. Boulding was an active participant in the seminars of the Center for Conflict Resolution, run by her husband at the University of Michigan, as she not only attended each meeting but also offered ideas for the growth of the center. She initiated the creation of a newsletter to spread the center's activities and work, gaining sponsorship for it from the Women's International League for Peace and Freedom after the committee at the center (including her husband, peace scholar Kenneth Boulding) dismissed the idea. Within her work and thinking, Boulding stressed the need for closely and realistically conceptualizing what a peaceful society would look like in order to assess the actions necessary for creating it.

=== Berenice Carroll ===
Berenice Carroll's research has largely focused on the limitations of the understanding of power in conventional peace research, specifically in that it narrowly prioritizes a "power-over" conceptualization over the feminist-based "power-with." While the "power-over" understanding defines power as dependent on the dominance of one institution or group over another, the significance of "power-with", Carroll stressed, has been clearly demonstrated by the strength and abilities of social movements like the women's and Black Power movements. The "power-with" framing entails a turn toward recognizing the agency of those who have previously been perceived to be powerless, and in doing so broadening the understanding of where and within whom power can be sourced.

In addition to her work on power, some of Carroll's earliest work in the field of peace research were her contributions to the Committee on Peace Research in History (now known as the Peace History Society), a group founded by historians that stressed the importance of addressing peace research's inherently transdisciplinary nature. She and fellow feminist historians Blanche Wiesen Cook and Sandi E. Cooper contributed to the newsletter produced by the committee, and the first issue of its journal (titled Peace & Change) was co-edited by Carroll.

=== Cynthia Enloe ===
Cynthia Enloe is best known for her research on the visibilization of women's lived experiences within patriarchal structures, pushing for an answer to the question "where are the women?" This question is meant to reveal women's absences in male-dominated institutions and systems of power, and to move toward reparation of the gaps in the conventional understanding of politics where women have been left out of the conversation. Within this, Enloe has devoted much of her career toward research specifically on the gendered dynamics of militarism. She argues that militarism exists far beyond the actual practices of the military, extending into domestic and interpersonal contexts, and that gendered dynamics play an inextricable role in its appearance in those spheres.

Enloe also contributed to founding the Women's and Gender Studies program at Clark University, where she has been a research professor in International Development, Community, and Environment since 1972.

=== Savitribai Phule ===
Savitribai Phule spearheaded the feminist movement in colonial India, devoting her work to understanding the differing experiences of violence across the caste system while promoting education as an emancipatory tool. She is especially notable for her very early conceptualizations of intersectionality, as she highlighted the violence of castes and patriarchal structures as interconnected and influential over one another. While Phule recognized education's potential to be a pathway for mass organizing and mobilizing against oppressions, she also saw the threat of its ability to continue to preserve structural violences.

=== Betty Reardon ===
Much of Betty Reardon's contributions to feminist peace research have centered around urging for a gendered perspective to be integrated into peace education. Reardon has been a notable proponent of the role of education in peace work while simultaneously stressing that feminist scholarship is often left out of the discussion. She has pointed to the ways in which the field of peace research as a whole has repeatedly sidelined women's issues and experiences, minimizing and considering them nonessential in analysis of conflict and peacebuilding. As part of her work in this area, Reardon has held founding roles in several initiatives for peace education, including the Peace Education Commission of the International Peace Research Association.

Alongside the work she has done in advocacy for a feminist peace education, Reardon's research has also focused on demonstrating the closely intertwined relationship between militarism and sexism. She has highlighted the ways in which these dynamics have shaped social norms and priorities and have brought the violence of war to other scales, including in the structuring of education systems.

== See also ==
- Jane Addams
- Cynthia Cockburn
- Catherine Eschle
- Feminism in international relations
- Feminist theory
- Gender analysis
- Greenham Common Women's Peace Camp
- List of women pacifists and peace activists
- Postcolonial feminism
- Seneca Women's Encampment for a Future of Peace and Justice
