= J. Ann Tickner =

American international relations scholar

- Born: Judith Ann Tickner; 1937 (age 88–89); London, England
- Spouse: Hayward Alker (d. 2007)

Academic background
- Education: University of London; Yale University; Brandeis University
- Thesis: Self-Reliant Development Versus Power Politics (1983)

Academic work
- Discipline: Political science
- Sub-discipline: International relations
- School or tradition: Feminism
- Institutions: College of the Holy Cross; University of Southern California
- Doctoral students: Laura Sjoberg
- Notable works: Self-Reliance Versus Power Politics (1987); "You Just Don't Understand" (1997); Gendering World Politics (2001)

Judith Ann Tickner (born 1937) is an Anglo-American feminist international relations theorist. As of March 2026 she is distinguished scholar in residence at the School of International Services, American University, Washington DC.

== Early life ==
Judith Ann Tickner was born in London, England, in 1937.

She received her B.A. in history from the University of London, M.A. in international relations from Yale University, and Ph.D. in political science from Brandeis University.

== Career ==
Tickner served as president of the International Studies Association (ISA) from 2006 to 2007.

Tickner was a professor of international relations at the University of Southern California for 15 years, and was afterwards became professor emerita.

She became a distinguished scholar in residence at the School of International Services, American University, Washington DC, in 2012, where she remains as of March 2026.

Her research focus is international relations theory from a feminist perspective, peace and security.

== Publications ==
Her books include Gendering World Politics: Issues and Approaches in the Post-Cold War Era (Columbia University Press, 2001), Gender in International Relations: Feminist Perspectives on Achieving International Security (Columbia University Press, 1992), and Self-Reliance Versus Power Politics: American and Indian Experiences in Building Nation-States (Columbia University Press, 1987). She has also authored many book chapters, journal articles, book reviews, and other publications.

She is known for her article "You Just Don't Understand" (International Studies Quarterly (1997) 41, 611-632), which critiqued mainstream international relations theorists for the omission of gender from their theory and practice.

== Recognition ==
On June 4, 1999, Tickner received an honorary doctorate from the Faculty of Social Sciences at Uppsala University, Sweden.

In 2007, she was the recipient of the Susan S. Northcutt Award from the Women's Caucus for International Studies at the ISA.

In July 2010, she was appointed Visiting Distinguished Professor at the University of Auckland in New Zealand.

Several awards have been named in her honour, including:

- J. Ann Tickner Book Prize, established in 2012 by the School of International Relations, USC
- J. Ann Tickner Prize for the Best Masters Dissertation in International Relations, established in 2010 by the Queen Mary College, University of London

In 2011 the International Studies Association established the J. Ann Tickner Award, to recognise her significant contribution to the organization, and in international relations more generally". The award "recognizes someone who, in Tickner's footsteps, consistently combines bravery in pursuing high-quality, pioneering scholarship that pushes the boundaries of the discipline with a deep commitment to service, especially teaching and mentoring." Past recipients include:

- 2013: Christine Sylvester
- 2014: Cecelia Lynch and Audie Klotz
- 2015: Kathryn Sikkink
- 2016: Robin Broad
- 2017: Martha Finnemore
- 2018: Nicola Phillips
- 2020: Caron Gentry
- 2021: Elisabeth Pruegl & Bina D'Costa
- 2025: Eve Darian-Smith & Stephanie Hofmann

== Personal life ==
Tickner was married to Hayward Alker until his death in 2007.

== Published works ==
- Feminism and International Relations: Conversations about the Past, Present and Future, ed. with Laura Sjoberg (Routledge, 2011).
- Gendering World Politics: Issues and Approaches in the Post-Cold War Era (Columbia University Press, 2001).
- Gender in International Relations: Feminist Perspectives on Achieving International Security (Columbia University Press, 1992).
- Self-Reliance Versus Power Politics: American and Indian Experiences in Building Nation-States (Columbia University Press, 1987).

== See also ==
- Carol Cohn
- Critical international relations theory
- Claire Duncanson
- Cynthia Enloe
- Sara Ruddick

Professional and academic associations
Preceded by William Thompson	President of the International Studies Association; 2006–2007	Succeeded by Jack Levy
