= Feminist security studies =

Feminist security studies is a subdiscipline of security studies that draws attention to gendered dimensions of security.

Feminist security studies (FSS) is the study of the various forms and implications of security through a gendered lens. As a sub-discipline of international relations (IR) and security studies, FSS aims to understand and analyse how issues such as militarisation, war, gender, race, economics and power politics intersect in states and globally.

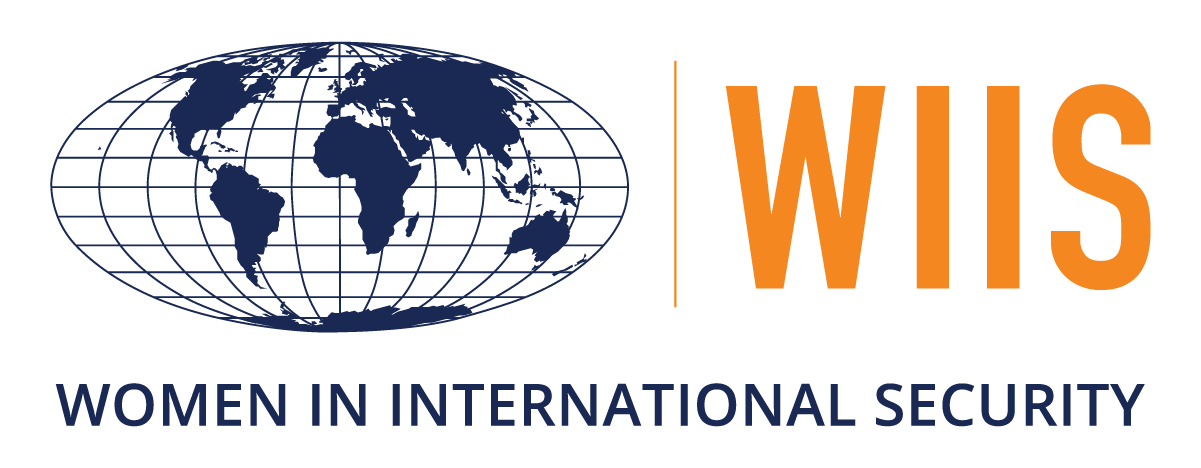
Global organisation 'Women in International Security' focused on extending the role of women in security.

Building on established themes within security studies such as war, conflict, organised violence and peace, FSS examines how social constructions of gender has an impact on how these themes operate institutionally and structurally. As an area of enquiry, FSS places significant focus on how gender plays a role in shaping decisions, ideas and theories in security studies, in particular the role and expectations of men and women. FSS analysis of above themes and issues can be categorised both as micro- such as understanding the impact of gender in securitisation perceptions on a daily basis, and macro- recognising the structural and societal constructions that have led to security studies being a masculinised field. FSS gained institutionalised and academic recognition as the field of security studies received greater interest during the Cold War. Academics such as Cynthia Enloe studied and critiqued the field of international relations for the lack of intersectionality with issues such as gender despite the impact it has.

== Academic history ==
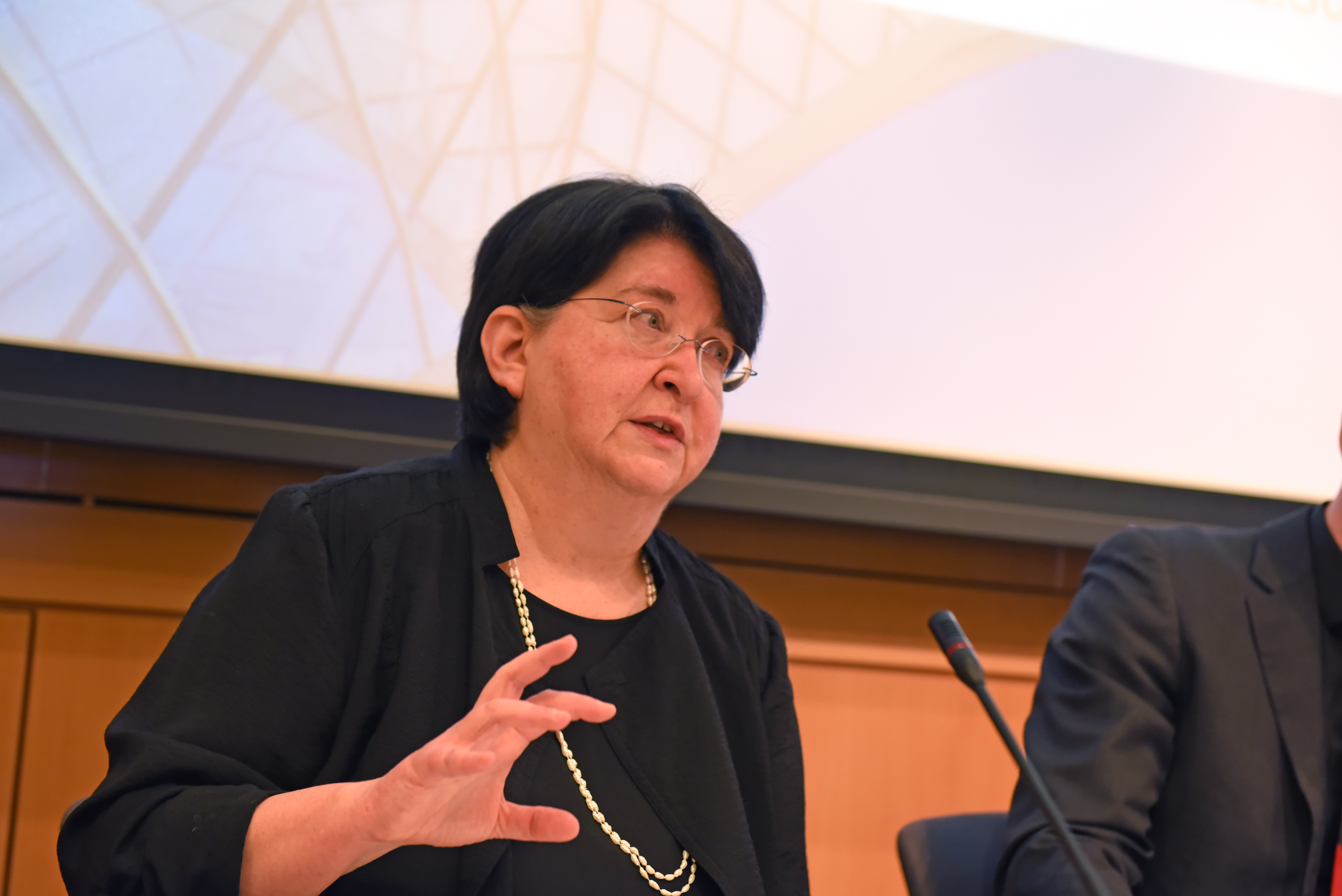
Pioneer in the field- Dr Carol Cohn

Feminist security studies is a subfield of security studies and critiques many events and academic works within the security studies arena through a gendered lens. Security studies became prominently institutionalised during and post-Cold War era. Barry Buzan analyses the progression of security studies as a result of the Cold War and the focus on organised violence. Some critics such as Carol Cohn have argued that the process of securitisation was inherently militarised, and at its core reflected the power dynamics projected through the use of violence and military between different states. Security studies focused on statehood and national security through a military lens that were deeply rooted in a masculinised and patriarchal understanding of (in)security. Critics and academics like Laura Shepherd and Carol Cohn have written extensively on the narrow construction of security studies both in academia and in practice as one being substantially masculine. Shepherd indicates to the development of FSS as a critic and response to the social and institutional understanding of the military being parallel to masculinity and the saturation of men within security. Academics such as Laura Sjoberg have produced works that analyse the mainstream theories and explanations of security studies predominantly war and the positionality of feminism in understanding and "theorising war".

Some of the early works such as "Women and International Relations,” published in Millennium—Journal of International Studies looked into a gendered perspective of security studies in the IR field in the 1980s-1990s. Early academic scholarship in the field indicated the lack of analysis in security studies pertaining to the role of gender, the dynamics of masculinity/femininity and the limited scope underpinning militarisation and security. Pioneers in the field like Carol Cohn, Cynthia Enloe, and Judith Ann Tickner, delved into categorising the various ways feminist perspectives were applicable in providing a more nuanced and relevant perspective on security studies that extended beyond the traditional scholarship of military and state power dynamics vis a vis violence. Discourse in the early academic stages of FSS involved defining and setting boundaries on concepts within mainstream security studies. Scholars such as Nicole Deratz argued that defining security studies itself will have significant impact on how it is analysed both academically and in other arenas such as policy. Thus, a major aspect of the development of FSS academia focused on understanding and expanding established theories and claims in IR that had previously neglected the role of women. Furthermore, FSS scholarship and academics began to analyse how the lack of a gendered perspective in security has impacted how security operated and was viewed both politically and socially.

Feminist security studies extended the scholarship of security studies from macro analysis of states and global actors to micro analysis of individualised impact of (in) security. This included analysing strategic state security through war, military, economic and politics but also individualised to those of ontological security, security of the self in identity, sexuality and gender. As Aleksander Gasztold indicates, FSS extended a purely militarised perspective to include a wider scope of security, such as economics, human rights, and environmental insecurity that was linked to how power was invested in a state and through what mechanisms. FSS academics such as Judith Tickner sought to establish intersectional links between the varying themes in security and feminist ideas.

== Theory ==
FSS claims are rooted in the wider feminist IR theory of the positionality of gender in IR knowledge and understanding. FSS claims can be categorised in focusing on how gender norms, ideas and structures have contributed to understanding the operation of security studies. FSS analyses the processes of securitisation and in particular militarisation at a state level that has an impact on the roles men and women are expected to play in political arenas and society at large. FSS is not limited to analysing the role and impact of women within security studies, but also examines the social structures, academic scholarship and political systems have been determined by gender and the perception of gendered roles. FSS furthers the claim that the established traditions and values within security embody a masculinised system of securitisation, militarism and violence without recognition of femininity.

- Hegemonic Masculinity in militarising security

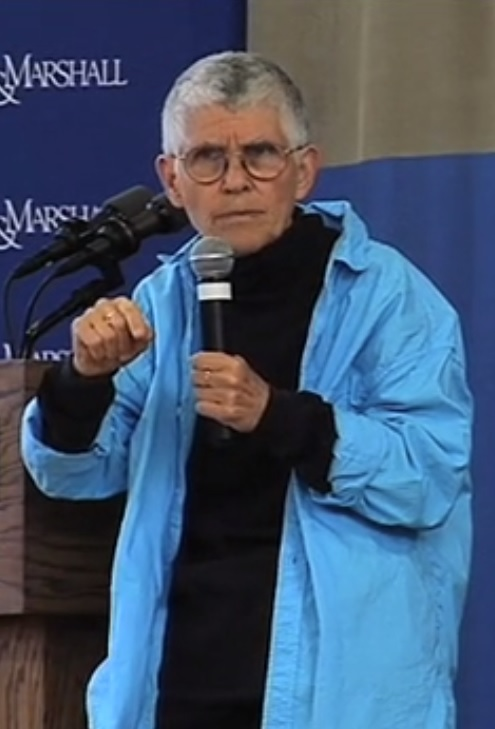
Pioneer Feminist writer Cynthia Enloe

Militarism and violence are key themes within security studies. Scholars such Cynthia Enloe holding feminist views have critiqued security studies as one being constructed through a singular lens of patriarchy and hegemonic masculinity without provision of holistic and encompassing understanding of how gender probes varying outcomes. FSS probes the notion that gender does not only inform the outcome and consequences of securitisation but is also the causes and ideas. The idea of masculinised securitisation stems from the saturation of men within spaces such as defence and the military that are seen as the domain of security. FSS scholars such as Judith Tickner propose the notion that the lack of women within security and the societal expectations of femininity has caused a hegemonic masculinity over the academic and operational field.

As a result, the distinction between FSS and traditional security studies arises through the academic development between what can be categorised as a 'security issue' in IR. The FSS approach claims that the militarisation of security at a state and global level is inherently masculine in its characteristics and criterion and thus limits the scope of security studies. In countries and states where security is seen predominantly as militarised, the perception follows that for women to be present within security as a stakeholder, as a unit of analysis or academic, the element of femininity must be suppressed or removed. FSS recognises the long historical role played by men in militarism and organised violence and the consequences of this on the perception of women as stakeholders within security. However FSS aims to extend the ambit of security beyond a militarised perspective at a state level to understand the individual, and social impacts of security. Through understanding the constructions of ideas and knowledge in IR and security studies, FSS scholars elucidate through criticising traditional theories, the significant role gender plays in shaping political and social discourse.

== Research methodology ==
FSS does not adhere stringently to one particular research methodology. Due to the nuance in perspectives and units of analysis multiple methodologies are utilised to accommodate to the varying research techniques and topics. These include but are not limited to: qualitative and quantitative methods of analysis and research. However, as FSS epistemological approach aligns with post-positivist and interpretivist, the use of qualitative approach to research is more common.

- Qualitative

According to Liz Stanley and Sue Wise most research within the FSS discipline is conducted by using the qualitative methodology. In FSS, qualitative research entails the analysis of varying social and political phenomena within an explanatory and interpretivist lens to provide a holistic perspective. Given progressive scope of security studies and the changing nature of FSS issues of analyses, qualitative research has been argued to be more encompassing. Research techniques within qualitative approach include ethnographies, interviews, discourse analysis and literature review.

- Quantitative

Quantitative research techniques within FSS include the collection and observation of quantifiable observations within security studies and its interconnectedness to other disciplines to draw reasonable inferences and generalised conclusions. A key use of quantitative techniques has been in constantly introducing gendered variables to political and IR issues and discussions.

- Epistemology

FSS epistemological claims are congruent with those of post-positivist and interpretivist approach to knowledge production. Interpretivist epistemological claims are rooted in the notion that knowledge and explanations of social phenomena are socially constructed based around discourse and traditions. Furthermore, approaches towards 'objectivity' or foundationalism that is used commonly in other IR fields are criticised as being implausible in FSS research due to research being conducted from varying perspectives and thus an extensive degree of interpretation is present disallowing objective truths to be manifest.

== Units of analysis ==
The units of analysis in FSS are similar to those of in security studies and other sub-disciplines in international relations. In security studies, specific focus is given to the nation states as the main units of analysis. The relationship between a state's power, and security is analysed vis a vis other states. Similarly, in FSS states and the operation of power, militarisation and process of securitisation are the main units of analysis. FSS also extends the scope of security studies to include the security and insecurity of individuals within larger structures especially through a gendered lens. Particular focus is placed on the positionality of women both historically and in contemporary times in security studies and IR fields. FSS also takes a comparative approach of the intersectionality of varying issues such as gender, race, class and economics within the scope of security studies.

- Gender

One of the main units of analysis in FSS is gender. Gender within FSS extends beyond understanding the polarity of men and women but also extends to issues such as sexuality, social constructs of gender orientation and expectations, and the impacts of gender on social and political discourse. FSS scholars such as Cynthia Enloe analyses how the lack of a gendered perspective critiquing the security systems has created an extensive masculinised field. Furthermore, the decisions and academia produced as a result of the masculinisation has created security studies to be socially perceived as a position for men. This also informs the power relations that is existent as a result of the hegemonic masculinity in security.

- Power

Within IR and security studies, power is a foundational theme in understanding many theories, ideas and approaches. Although power is defined and analysed differently through different feminist lenses, within FSS power is intertwined with how security is perceived. Power relations in FSS occur between men and women but also between how different structures operate depending on the societal and political constructions. FSS scholars such as Carol Cohn argue that security is saturated with men and has historically been a field that is masculine, and as such strength and power is invested in masculine attributes, ideas and strategies while feminine characteristics often attributed to women (such as emotions) are deemed as weakness and hindrances to the power structures. Aleksandra Gasztold analyses the intersection between how militarism and monopolising on organised violence can have a direct impact on how power is distributed and as security is often a field associated with men, this power is disproportionately attributed to men.

== See also ==
- Gender in security studies
- Critical international relations theory
- Critical security studies
- Feminism (international relations)
- Gender studies
