= Stiehm =

Stiehm is a surname. Notable people with the surname include:

- Ewald O. Stiehm (1886–1923), American football player, coach, and college athletics administrator
- Judith Stiehm (born 1935), American political scientist
- Meredith Stiehm (born 1968), American television producer, writer, and trade union leader
