= Gender in security studies =

Subfield of international relations

Gender in security studies is a subfield of international relations and comparative politics. Feminist security studies and queer security studies have provided a gender lens which shows that the study of wars, conflicts, and the institutions involved in peace and security decision-making cannot be done fully without examining the role of gender and sexuality. Praising of masculine qualities has created a hierarchy of power and gender where femininity is looked down upon. Institutions reflect these power dynamics, creating systemic obstacles where women, who are seen as less capable than men, are prevented from holding high positions. Evolutionary theory and political sociology provides an understanding of how institutions like the patriarchy were created and how perceptions around national security formed between men and women.

In order to understand gender, one must look at how hierarchies create power dynamics between masculine and feminine qualities. Societal beliefs around gender and its relationship with security can be traced back to the praising of masculine qualities for such positions. This favor has enabled hierarchy of power and gender to form where femininity is looked down upon. Institutions reflect these power dynamics, creating systemic obstacles where women, who are seen as less capable than men, are prevented from holding high positions. In order to obtain such positions, women have had to take on more masculine qualities. Societal expectations of gender and its relationship to security, however, have been found to be erroneous and filled with bias.

Gender plays a role in civil conflicts with who is in battle and who is receiving assistance. Women are sought by groups to fight and are also use as symbols for public audiences. Ideas surrounding victimhood and gender, however, result in protection agencies overlooking men when providing aid.

The international community has taken steps to recognize and improve women's participation in the security and peace sectors. The United Nations Security Council passed Resolution 1325 to improve women's involvement. However, a sidestreaming phenomenon has formed in which women are kept in certain roles in the security sector while institutions promote inclusion in all aspects. This has raised questions of whether the goal should be to include more women or to restructure existing institutions so that they are truly gender neutral. Nepal has had success in improving women's involvement in their security and peace sectors through the use of civil society organizations.

== Evolutionary theory and biology ==
Evolutionary theory has been used as a means to understand behavior of genders and how society has been structured as a result. When groups began to form, dominance hierarchies were established as a way to keep stability within the group and ensure its safety with outside groups. Evolutionary theory argues that such dominance hierarchies which aim to control women and reinforce violence with other men have evolved into the present patriarchy, regulating women’s reproductive abilities and shaping men's inclination to use violence when settling disputes.

When tied with political sociology, evolutionary theory gains a new meaning to show that those who threaten the patriarchy and the nation are treated with violence. This explains why feminists have been met with such antagonism when trying to change societal structures since it is interpreted as a challenge to the male-created systems and thus the nation. The effects of gender hierarchies can also be seen in the relationship between countries during conflict. States will project a feminine image of their adversaries while promoting a more masculine perception of themselves because of the power connotations created from the oppressive structure.

== Gender bias in the security sector ==
Laura Sjoberg points out questions in feminist scholarship to say that recognizing the role of all genders in conflict (as fighters, victims of sexual violence, soldiers of allied states, journalists, military leaders etc.) is important as it can show how societal ideas about gender affects behavior and influences people's actions. Feminist scholars like Maya Eichler and Susan Willet explain that there are essentialist beliefs about female nature which make women appear more suitable for certain jobs. For example, women peacekeepers are more utilized to help post-conflict communities and victims because ideas about women being nurturers and nonviolent. However, these gender perceptions also cause women peacekeepers to be kept from decision-making negotiations with leaders of feuding states.

Gender bias appears in how positions are perceived as well. Historically in war, soldiers on aircraft were thought to be less masculine because of how far away it was from the battlefield. Aircraft are also constructed solely with male body in mind, further reinforcing the traditionalist ideas that women are interlopers in the military space.

When looking at public perceptions of security, Daniel Stevens and his peers found that contrary to public opinion research, men and women picked relatively similar points when thinking about what is important in terms of security. While there were some differences, both saw "Physical Safety" as their primary concern. Additionally, data showed that stereotypes around women being more fearful about security threats was incorrect. Men were found to be more concerned while women approached scenarios with logic and reason.

== Gender and international conflict ==
Studies have examined whether the gender of leaders affects war outbreak. A 2015 study of leader characteristics and war outbreak found no significant relationship between the gender of leaders and war outbreak. The Georgetown Institute (2020) reports that women groups that act as third parties to peace negotiations increase the likelihood of adopting gender provisions by 22 percent. Civil Society Organizations (CSOs) acting as official third parties in peace negotiations increase the probability of adopting gender provisions by 13 percent. In addition, countries failing to address gendered economic inequalities see a 35% higher chance of returning to conflict within ten years, further destabilizing their economy.

A 2018 study in the American Journal of Political Science found that women have historically been excluded from senior positions in defense ministries, "particularly in states that are engaged in fatal disputes, governed by military dictators, and large military spenders." A 2020 study in International Organization found that it was not democracy per se that reduces the prospects for conflict, but whether women's suffrage was ensured. The study argued, "women's more pacific preferences generate a dyadic democratic peace (i.e., between democracies), as well as a monadic peace." According to a 2016 study, survey data across 1982–2013 indicated that there were systematic differences in attitudes towards the use of force among men and women.

According to a 2020 study by Joshua A. Schwartz and Christopher W. Blair, gender stereotypes about leaders lead to audience costs, as women leaders are punished more severely for backing down after issuing threats.

== Gender and civil conflict ==
Studies have examined how gender relates to violence in civil wars. According to Reed M. Wood, rebel groups recruit women fighters because they are a resource in the battlefield, as well as serve important propaganda tool for domestic and international audiences. A 2021 study in International Organization found that female suicide attacks were more lethal in countries with regressive gender norms. A 2003 study by Charli Carpenter in International Organization found that discourses around gender and victimhood shaped the behavior by civilian protection agencies towards the victims of civil war violence: even though adult men were at greatest risk of massacre in the Yugoslav Wars, the focus of civilian protection agencies was overwhelmingly on protecting women and children. Research by Dara Kay Cohen has explained rape in civil wars as being rooted in strategic rationales to boost the cohesion of military groups.

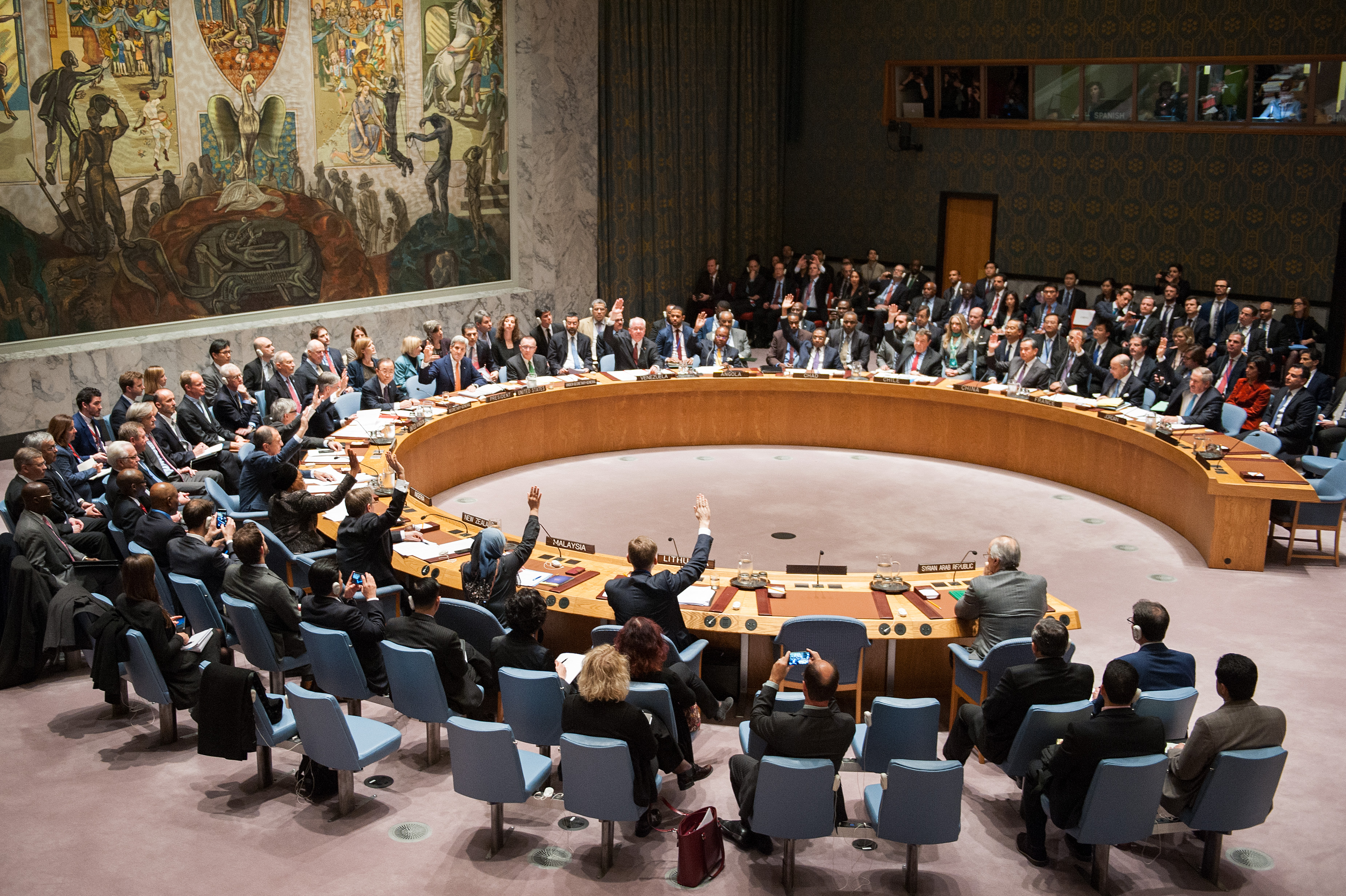
The United Nations Security Council voting at their meeting on Syria in 2015.

== Conflict prevention through gender inclusion ==
A turning point in the international communities’ recognition of gender in the security sector was the passing of the UN Security Council Resolution 1325 in 2000. This resolution put forth the Women, Peace, and Security Agenda which consists of four points that aims to increase women's participation in the security and peace sector while also improving the support women receive from institutions, considering their needs in conflict zones, military positions, peacekeeping roles, etc. Eight resolutions were passed in the next two decades with ideas about how to advance the WPS Agenda.

=== Mainstreaming vs. sidestreaming ===
Vanessa Newby and Clotilde Sebag's definition of "sidestreaming" is:

“...the practice, deliberate or unintentional, of sidelining women and relegating them to specialized spaces in international peace and security while attempting gender mainstreaming or increased gender integration.”

The UNSCR 1325 focuses on gender mainstreaming as it recommends the increased involvement of women in the security and peace sector. However, perceptions of institutions like national militaries being gender-neutral have been confronted with a gender lens, showing that there are systemic factors resulting in a gender gap in the security sector. Newby explains that countries with high numbers of women in their militaries send more women to post-conflict zones as peacekeepers. However, militaries that have a smaller percentage of women serving, are not able to send as many, creating a gender gap. There are multiple factors that may prevent women from serving besides legal obstacles, such as recruitment strategies that advertise assisting or medical jobs to women rather than combat-related services and societal beliefs about motherhood and women’s capabilities.

When thinking about the most progressive way to implement plans that will lead to gender inclusivity, two trains of thought emerge. Liberal feminist see gender inclusion as an opportunity to alter past systems and form more equitable institutions. Minna Lyytikäinen shares that Nepal has been a model country in their implementation of the WPS agenda as they have utilized civil society organizations and women who were victims of conflict to draft a comprehensive and effective National Action Plan. Anti-militarist feminists, however, argue that the addition of women to such institutions will not change their fundamental hegemonic masculine structures.

== See also ==
- Feminist security studies
- Women in war
- Women in the military
