= Laura Sjoberg =

American scholar

- Born: Laura Elizabeth Sjoberg; February 19, 1979 (age 47)

Academic background
- Education: University of Chicago (BA); University of Southern California (PhD); Boston College (JD)
- Thesis: Gendering Just War (2004)
- Doctoral advisor: J. Ann Tickner

Academic work
- Discipline: Political science
- Sub-discipline: International relations
- School or tradition: Feminism
- Institutions: Virginia Tech; Harvard University; University of Florida; Royal Holloway, University of London; University of Oxford (Exeter)
- Main interests: Feminist security studies; international relations theory; international security; just war theory
- Website: www.laurasjoberg.com

Laura Elizabeth Sjoberg (born February 19, 1979) is an American feminist scholar of international relations and international security. Her work specializes in gendered interpretations of just war theory, feminist security studies, and women's violence in global politics.

She is author (with Caron Gentry) of Mothers, Monsters, Whores: Women's Violence in Global Politics (Zed Books 2007), Gender, Justice, and the Wars in Iraq, (Lexington Books 2006), and Gender, War, & Conflict (Polity Press, 2014). She is editor of Gender and International Security: Feminist Perspectives (Routledge 2010), Rethinking the 21st Century: New Problems, Old Solutions (Zed Books 2009, with Amy Eckert), Feminist International Relations: Conversations about the Past, Present, and Future (Routledge 2011, with J. Ann Tickner), Gender, War, and Militarism: Feminist Perspectives (Praeger Security International, with Sandra Via), and Women, Gender, and Terrorism (University of Georgia Press 2012, with Caron Gentry).

She served as the Homebase Editor for the International Feminist Journal of Politics (with Cynthia Weber and Heidi Hudson), from 2011 until 2017. She also held an editorial position at the International Studies Review, from 2015 until 2017, and an associate editorial position with the International Studies Review, from 2013 until 2015.

She was a British Academy Global Professor of Politics and International Relations at Royal Holloway, University of London from 2020 until 2024.

Currently, she is a Professor of International Relations at University of Oxford and a Politics and International Relations fellow at Exeter College, Oxford.

== Life and career ==
=== Education ===
Sjoberg is a Professor of International Relations at University of Oxford and a Politics and International Relations fellow at Exeter College, Oxford. From 2020 until 2024, Sjoberg was a British Academy Global Professor of Politics and International Relations, Head of the Department of Politics, International Relations and Philosophy, and Director of the Gender Institute at Royal Holloway, University of London. She has previously taught and researched at the University of Florida, Harvard Kennedy School at Harvard University, Duke University, Boston College, Virginia Polytechnic Institute and State University, Brandeis University, and Merrimack College. She holds a Doctor of Philosophy degree in international relations and gender studies from the University of Southern California and a J.D. degree from Boston College.

=== Background ===
Sjoberg formerly held a position as Chair of the International Studies Association Committee on the Status of Women. She has given invited presentations at the University of Florida Law School, Harvard University, Lancaster University, Virginia State University, the University of Virginia, Hollins University, the University of Pennsylvania, Tufts University, Massachusetts Institute of Technology, the University of Michigan, the University of Minnesota, the University of Wisconsin, the University of Southern California and Duke University, as well as at meetings of the International Studies Association, the American Political Science Association, and the National Women's Studies Association.

Her work has been published in International Studies Quarterly, the International Feminist Journal of Politics, Security Studies, International Studies Perspectives, International Relations, Politics and Gender, International Studies Review, Feminist Review, International Politics, International Political Sociology, and other academic journals and edited volumes. She is editor of book series at New York University Press on "Gender and Political Violence", and at Oxford University Press on "Gender and International Relations" (with J. Ann Tickner).

== Books ==
Writing extensively on the topics she studies, Sjoberg's catalogue of authored books currently includes:

- International Relations' Last Synthesis? (with J. Samuel Barkin, Oxford University Press, 2019);
- Women as Wartime Rapists (New York University Press, 2016);
- Beyond Mothers, Monsters, Whores (with Caron Gentry, Zed Books, 2015);
- Gender War and Conflict (Polity, 2014);
- Gendering Global Conflict: Toward a Feminist Theory of War (Columbia University Press, 2013);
- Mothers, Monsters, Whores (with Caron Gentry, Zed Books, 2007);
- Gender, Justice, and the Wars in Iraq (Lexington Books, 2006).

Sjoberg also contributes to several book series, including Oxford Studies in International Relations, Perspectives on Political Violence, and Gender and Global Security. These writings address myriad topics including, but not limited to, the technicalities of war, women in wartime roles that often hold a "masculine" connotation, and sexual violence and assault as a weapon of war.

=== Edited collections ===
- Handbook on Gender and Security (with Laura Shepherd and Caron Gentry, Routledge, 2018);
- Interpretive Quantification (with J. Samuel Barkin, Michigan, 2018);
- Gender and Crisis in Global Politics (Routledge, 2017);
- Women, Gender, and Terrorism (with Caron Gentry, University of Georgia Press, 2011);
- Feminism and International Relations (with J. Ann Tickner, Routledge, 2011);
- Gender, War, and Militarism (with Sandra Via, Praeger Security International, 2010);
- Feminist Theory and Gender Studies Section of the International Studies Compendium (Blackwell, 2010);
- Gender and International Security (Routledge, 2010);
- Rethinking the 21st Century (with Amy Eckert, Zed Books, 2009).

== See also ==
- Critical international relations theory
- Feminism (IR Theory)
