= Audie Klotz =

American international political scientist

Academic background
- Education: Cornell University; Oberlin College
- Thesis: Censure, consensus and sanctions: The role of international norms in policy-making toward South Africa (1991)

Academic work
- Institutions: Syracuse University; Haverford College; University of Illinois at Chicago; Stellenbosch University
- Notable works: Norms in International Relations: The Struggle against Apartheid (1995)

Audie Jeanne Klotz is an American international political scientist specializing in international relations and South African politics. She is a Distinguished Professor in the Maxwell School of Citizenship and Public Affairs at Syracuse University.

== Early life ==
Klotz completed a Master's and PhD from Cornell University.

== Career ==
Klotz was elected president of the International Studies Association in 2025.

Klotz is the professor of political science at the Maxwell School of Citizenship and Public Affairs of Syracuse University since 2003. In 2026, she was named the inaugural Heighberger Family Faculty Fellow of Public Service as well as a Distinguished Professor. She was previously an associate professor at Haverford College, the University of Illinois at Chicago, and Stellenbosch University.

== Books ==
- Norms in International Relations: the Struggle against Apartheid, (Cornell University Press, 1995).
- Migration and National Identity in South Africa, 1860-2010 (Cambridge University Press, 2013).
- Strategies for Research in Constructivist International Relations, with Cecelia Lynch, (ME Sharpe, 2007).
- How Sanctions Work: Lessons from South Africa, co-edited with Neta Crawford, (Macmillan, 1999).
- Qualitative Methods in International Relations: A Pluralist Guide, co-edited with Deepa Prakash, (Palgrave, 2008).

== Awards ==
- 2023 Wasserstrom Prize
- 2020 Distinguished Scholar Award from the International Organization Section of ISA
- 2018 ENMISA Distinguished Scholar Award
- 2014 J. Ann Tickner Award
- 1998 Fulbright fellowship
