= Bananas, Beaches and Bases =

1990 book by Cynthia Enloe

- First edition
- Author: Cynthia Enloe
- Language: English
- Publisher: University of California Press
- Publication date: January 11, 1990; May 16, 2014 (revised edition)
- Publication place: United States
- Media type: Print
- Pages: 244 (first edition); 496 (revised edition)
- ISBN: 978-0520069848

Bananas, Beaches and Bases: Making Feminist Sense of International Politics is a book by Cynthia Enloe. It was first published in 1990, with a revised edition published in 2014. The book focuses on feminist international relations theory, deriving its title from "the gendered history of the banana" as exemplified by promotion of sales through images of Carmen Miranda, as well as gendered issues regarding tourism and military bases.

== Content ==
The book describes how gender, ethnicity and class affect the everyday lives of women worldwide, using a variety of sources including historical and government documents, biographical literature, news media and interviews. The book features chapters on tourism, colonialism, nationalism, women and military bases, diplomatic spouses, Carmen Miranda and banana plantations, female textile workers, international bankers, migrant domestic workers and the International Monetary Fund.

In the revised edition, Enloe adds content on new manifestations of militarism, gives new accounts of women in and affected by the military, and comments on the various ways women "have sought to resist the devastating effects of violence and war", noting the work of Syrian and Iraqi feminists and Afghan women.

== Reception ==
Reviewing the book for the American Political Science Association in 1991, Anne Sisson Runyan described it as "groundbreaking", saying it offered a "refreshing, insightful, and critical departure from conventional, top-down treatments of international politics." In 1992, Judith Hicks Stiehm in Signs called it a "marvelously broad exploration of women and international affairs", praising its good use of photographs, breadth, "punchiness", and originality, concluding that it was "guaranteed" to be widely read. Writing for the American Sociological Association in 1993, Kathryn Ward called it "a must read" for people interested in any aspect of world economics or politics.
