= Annie E. Molloy =

American activist

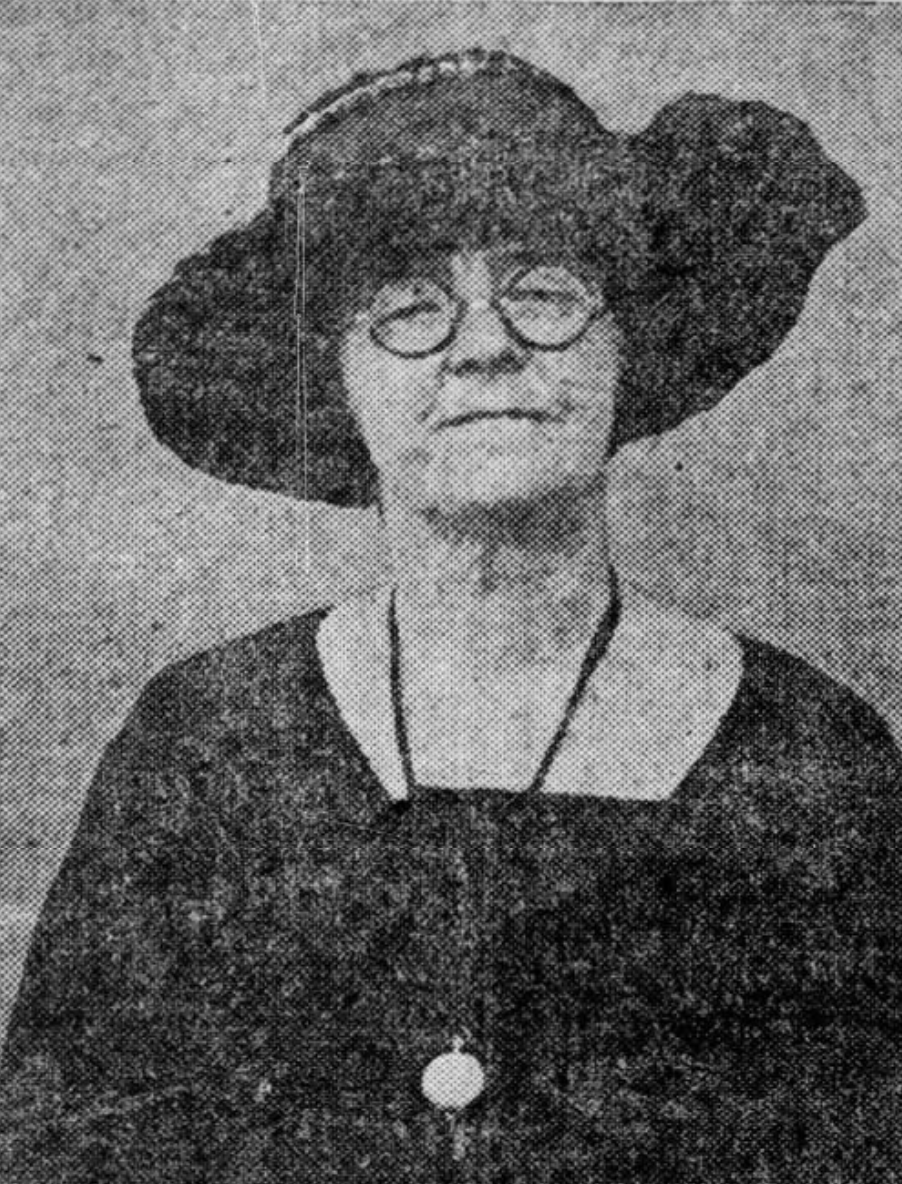
- Annie E. Molloy, from a 1923 newspaper
- Born: November 18, 1871; Boston, Massachusetts
- Died: March 17, 1928; Boston, Massachusetts
- Other names: Anna Molloy
- Occupation(s): Union leader, suffragist

Annie Elizabeth Molloy (November 18, 1871 – March 17, 1928) was an American suffragist and labor leader. She was president of the Boston Telephone Operators Union in the 1910s and 1920s. In 1915 she was a delegate to the International Congress of Women meeting in the Netherlands.

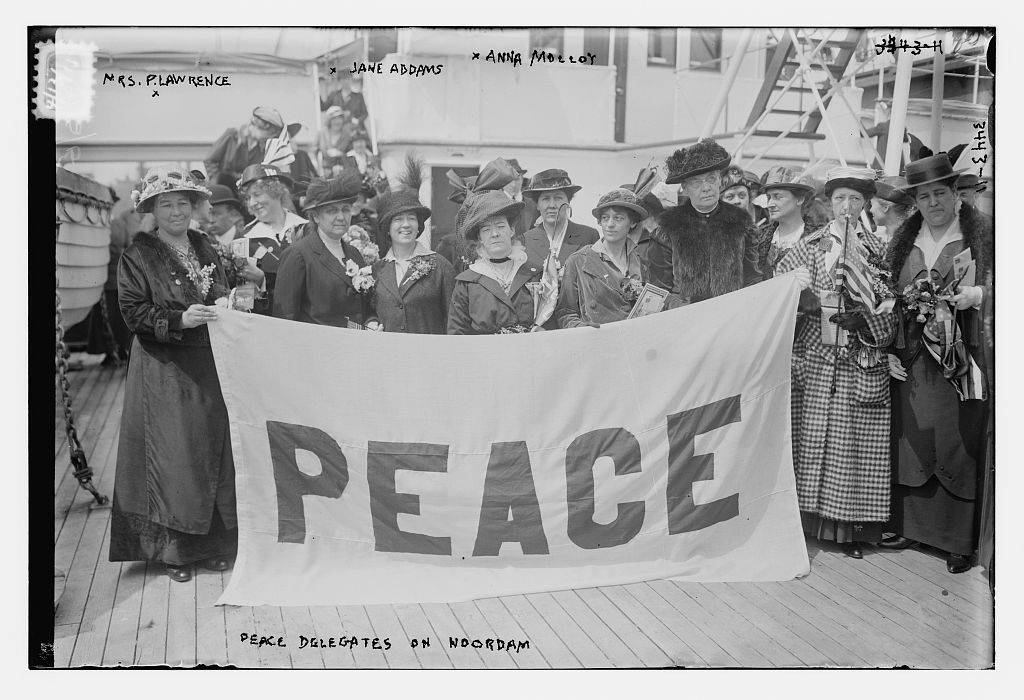
Peace Delegates in 1915; Molloy is standing behind the A in the banner, in company with Jane Addams, Emmeline Pethick-Lawrence, Mary Heaton Vorse, and Lillian G. Kohlhamer

== Early life ==
Molloy was born in Boston, Massachusetts, the daughter of John Molloy and Susan Smith Molloy. Both of her parents were Irish immigrants; her father was a harnessmaker, and worked on the railroad. She attended St. Mary's School in Boston's North End.

== Career ==
Molloy began working as a telephone operator in 1902. She was organizer and first president of the Boston Telephone Operator's Union, which she led from 1912 to 1916 and from 1922 to 1923. As leader of a union of women workers, she was a delegate to the International Congress of Women meeting in 1915, held in The Hague. In 1923, her local did not join the larger telephone operators' union in New England when it went on strike, but they worked for a peaceful settlement with the striking group, saying "while our local union will not be involved in the present strike, we have the profoundest sympathy for the girls on whom this strike was precipitated and we feel keenly the injustice done them."

In 1921, she was included in a Boston Globe feature titled "Boston Women Making their Political Bow—Is it a Debut or a Fight?" One photograph published with the story was of Molloy, "longtime active suffragist", shaking her fist at the camera and scowling.

== Personal life ==
Molloy lived with her father until he died in 1920, and then with her older brother, Philip Molloy. She was described as being of small stature, about 5 feet 1 inch tall, and having a "wonderful sense of humor". She died from pneumonia in 1928. Her funeral included a "human lane formed by fully 100 telephone operators" to guide her coffin from her home to the church; former Boston mayor James Michael Curley attended the service.
