= Sue Wise =

Sue Wise (born 1953) is a feminist author, Professor of Social Justice and Director of Study for BA (Hons) Social Work at Lancaster University, UK.

After having received a social science degree at Manchester Polytechnic, Sue Wise worked as a political activist for several years. In the 1970s and 1980s she was deeply involved in the Women's Movement and the Lesbian and Gay Movement, mainly in Manchester. She is also a social worker having experience in the voluntary and statutory sectors in both residential and field work, mainly working with children and families.

Since 1989, Wise teaches Social Justice at Lancaster University. She is currently focusing on the Social Work programs and doing research studies in experiences of UK lesbian, gay, and bisexual young people. She is also involved in a current project that is looking at the historical and present-day experiences of South African children, with particular reference to the AIDS pandemic and the emergence of child-headed households.

Apart from these projects, Wise continues to publish on feminist theory and particularly on feminist research methodology. Together with Liz Stanley, she has published several books and articles on social, feminist and gender topics.

== List of publications ==
- (with Liz Stanley) Breaking out: feminist consciousness and feminist research (1982)
- (with Liz Stanley) Men and sex: a case study in 'sexual sexual politics' (1984)
- Becoming a feminist social worker (1985)
- (with Liz Stanley) Georgie Porgie: sexual harassment in everyday life (1987)
- Doing feminist social work: an annotated bibliography and an introductory essay (1988)
- Child abuse: the NSPCC version (1991)
- (with Liz Stanley) Breaking out again: feminist ontology and epistemology (1993)
