= Catherine Eschle =

British political scientist, scholar

Catherine Eschle is a British political scientist, scholar, feminist and researcher who is best known for her research which centres around the concepts of feminism, resistance, intersectionality, social movements, gender-politics, democracy, and International Relations. Since 2001 Eschle has been published in journals such as: Westview press, Security Dialogues International Studies Quarterly, and the European Journal of Politics and Gender, and Political Studies.

Eschle currently holds a position at the University of Strathclyde in Scotland where she is a senior lecturer as well as a position at Alpen-Adria-Universität Klagenfurt in Austria as a guest lecturer where she focuses on gender studies.

== Career ==
=== Education ===
Eschle attended the University of Bristol where she received her Bachelor of Science (BSc) in 1993. She continued her educational journey which eventually lead her to obtaining a Master of Science (M.Sc.) from the London School of Economics and Political Science in 1995. Finally, Eschle earned a Doctorate of Philosophy (PhD) in social and political thought from the University of Sussex in 1999.

Currently, Eschle teaches at the University of Strathclyde where she is a senior lecturer in the School of Government and Public Policy and directs the honours program of Politics and International Relations at the university. Eschle also teaches various masters level classes at the school (focusing on topics such as feminism, international relations, and gender studies) and is the director of first year undergraduate studies at the university. In addition to her work at the University of Strathclyde, Eschle guest-lectures at Alpen-Adria-Universität Klagenfurt in Austria where she focuses on social movements and theories in gender studies.

Eschle also remains an active member of numerous feminist scholarly associations such as: AtGender, the European International Studies Association (EISA), the International Studies Association (the Feminist Theory and Gender Studies section) and the “Gendering International Relations” group of the British International Studies Association.

=== Research contributions ===
During her career Eschle has written for several acclaimed journals such as Security Dialogue, International Studies Quarterly, and the European Journal of Politics and Gender, and Political Studies.

Eschle’s primary area of research discusses the global justice movement in which she has written two books and several research articles about. Her books are titled: Making Feminist Sense of the Global Justice Movement and Global Democracy, Social Movements, And Feminism (the latter of which was co-written with Bice Maiguashca).

Eschle further classifies her research into two categories: “Engendering protest camps” and “Gender Feminism and (Anti-) Nuclear Politics in the post–cold war world.” Through “Engendering protest camps,” Eschle examines “the protest camp phenomenon from a feminist perspective.” Eschle's work regarding this topic has been published in numerous journals (such as International Feminist journal of Politics, Security Dialogue and Social Movement Studies).

Through “Gender, Feminism and (Anti-) Nuclear Politics in the Post–Cold War World” Eschle looks to examine the post–cold war and nuclear politics through a feminist perspective. Additionally, Eschle examines the connection between feminist work and anti-nuclear activism in the post–cold war world, and the impact of gender on nuclear politics.

== Most notable publications ==
1. “Global democracy, social movements, and feminism,” C Eschle, (Westview Press, 2001)
2. “Critical theories, international relations and 'the anti-globalisation movement': the politics of global resistance,” (Routledge, 2005)
3. “Making feminist sense of the global justice movement,” C Eschle, B Maiguashca (Rowman & Littlefield Publishers, 2010)
4. “‘Skeleton women’: feminism and the antiglobalization movement,” C Eschle (Signs: Journal of women in culture and society, 30 (3), 1741-1769, 2005)
5. “Constructing' the anti-globalisation movement,” C Eschle (International Journal of Peace Studies, 61-84, 2004)
6. “Rethinking globalised resistance: feminist activism and critical theorising in international relations,” C Eschle, B Maiguashca (The British Journal of Politics and International Relations, 9 (2), 284-301, 2007)
7. “Feminism, women’s movements and women in movement,” S Motta, CM Flesher Fominaya, C Eschle, L Cox (Interface: a journal for and about social movements, 2011)
