= Lillian G. Kohlhamer =

American suffragist

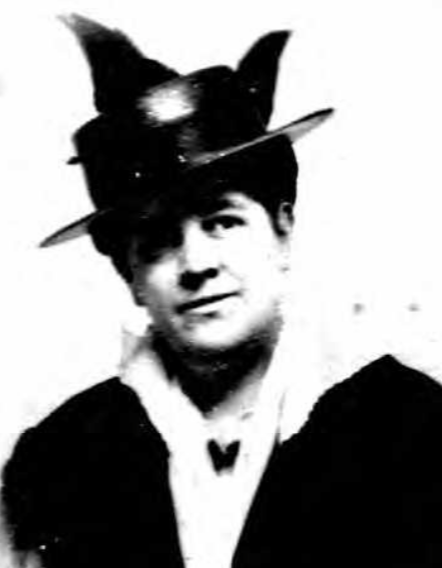
- Lillian G. Kohlhamer, from her 1915 passport application
- Born: Lillian Gonzales; November 13, 1870; Buffalo, New York
- Died: November 26, 1929; Italy
- Other names: Lillian Gottlieb Kohlhammer
- Occupation(s): Suffragist, peace activist

Lillian Gonzales Kohlhamer (November 13, 1870 – November 26, 1929), also known as Lillian Gottlieb Kohlhamer, was an American suffragist and peace activist, based in Chicago. She was one of the American delegates to the International Congress of Women held in The Hague in 1915, and at the International Woman Suffrage Alliance conference in Geneva in 1920.

== Early life ==
Lillian Gonzales was born in Buffalo, New York, eldest child of Frank Gonzales and Rosalie Davignon Gonzales. Her father was from Cuba, and her mother was from Québec.

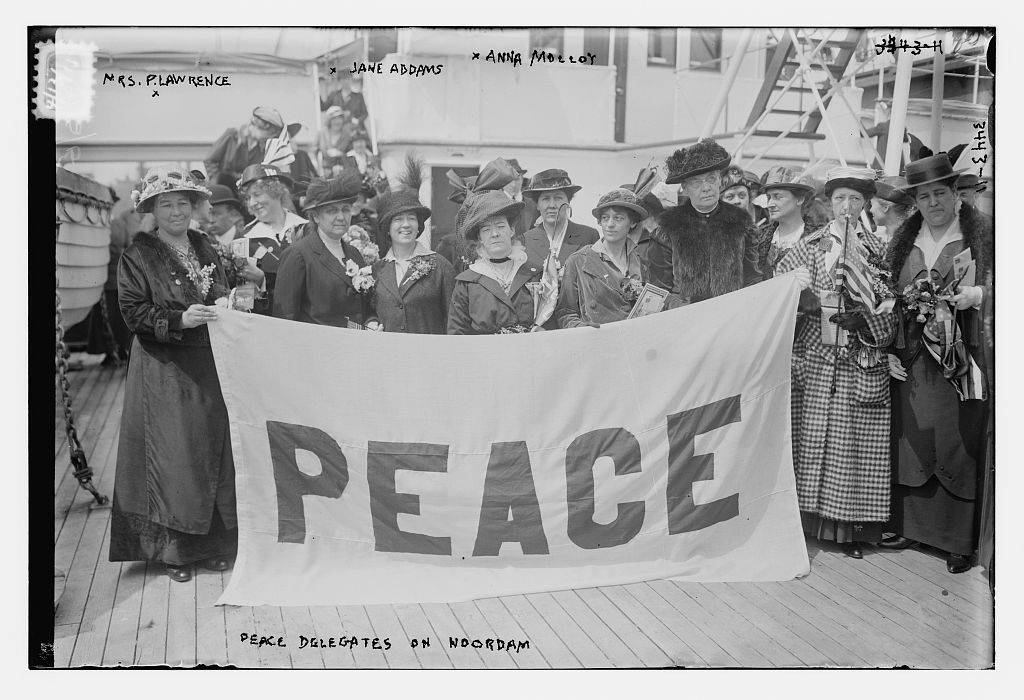
Peace activists heading to the International Congress of Women in 1915, including Emmeline Pethick-Lawrence, Jane Addams, Annie E. Molloy, and on the far right edge, Lillian G. Kohlhamer.

== Career ==
Kohlhamer was active as a suffragist and pacifist in Illinois. She was a member of the Bathing Beaches and Swimming Pools committee of the Chicago Woman's Club. She also supported Chicago schools superintendent Ella Flagg Young. In 1914 she withdrew from the Woman's Party of Cook County, citing "too much dissension in the organization". She was a life member of the Art Institute of Chicago.

Kohlhamer represented the Chicago Political Equality League, the Chicago Woman's Club, and the Illinois State Suffrage Association as a delegate to the International Congress of Women in 1915. She was quoted on the execution of Edith Cavell in The New York Times, saying "It is barbarism. Those are wickedly extreme measures to take in this age of the world's history."

In 1916 Kohlhamer was one of the Illinois suffragists at the national meeting of the National American Woman Suffrage Association (NAWSA) in Atlantic City. She and Margaret Strand represented Illinois suffragists at the 1920 International Woman Suffrage Alliance meeting, held in Geneva. During the early 1920s she did postwar relief work in Germany and Austria.

== Personal life ==
Lillian Gonzales married businessman Robert W. Kohlhamer in 1894. He died in 1920. She died at her villa near Florence, Italy, in 1929, two weeks after her 59th birthday.
