= Claire Duncanson =

Claire Duncanson (born 15 January 1974) is a professor at the department of Social and Political Science; at the University of Edinburgh. Her research fields include Intersectional Security, International Relations theory and gender politics.

In 2008, Duncanson and Dr. Eschle published a co-authored article titled "Gender and the Nuclear Weapons State: A Feminist Critique of the UK Government’s White Paper on Trident". The primary inquiry in her work was to establish a connection between gender and the nuclear weapons state. While giving credit to Carol Cohn, she tackles the issue of gendered language and its place within feminist critique of the White Paper. Her argument is that since the military is so highly masculinized, there is room for feminist critique and opposition because the evidence is not only apparent, but is also overwhelming in that gender narratives are predominantly generalized with positive and negative sexualized connotations. Her claim is that not only is mitigation of gender narratives required within the military, but that they are a necessity to disassembling the "addiction" and need for nuclear weapons. By examining the White Paper from a feminist point of view, she is able to establish that the way in which the state contextualized the language used within the White Paper publication is predominantly under the standard of sexual potency and masculinity. However the feminine terminology is stigmatized within military language; thus creating a duality of sexual binaries where one is inherently better than the other by simple term association within the language narrative. The sexual metaphorical imagery of "vertical erector launchers, thrust-to-weight ratios, soft lay downs, deep perpetration and orgasmic whump" gives evidence to the predominant phallic nature of the military. Furthermore, there is an underlying discourse towards gendered weakness by the dichotomy of the "protector" and the "protected". She asserts that classifying something as "invulnerable, invincible and impregnable" is a masculine trait; because by definition and association of pregnancies, women are the ones susceptible to pregnancy. Following this logic, one can assume that the role of protector falls into the role of the empowered male and the protected is therefore the vulnerable females. In a further example of the binary, she assumes the role of the protector as the state itself and that any rational individual within; can depict their ideologies as a "sober and mature man who gives careful thought to the achievement of his purposes". She indicated that this once again creates the illusion that the realist state is a rational "manly state"; thus creating the multitude of different dichotomies such as "active/passive", "independent/ (inter)dependent", "rational/irrational"; each signifying the proposed association of the positive traits to the male gender and the negative to the female gender. She concludes that while there is "less than expected" of masculine lined language, it is apparent that at both face value, and while reading between the lines, that feminine terminology is devalued throughout the White Paper.
