= Judith Stiehm =

American political scientist

- Born: October 9, 1935 (age 90); Madison, Wisconsin, US
- Education: University of Wisconsin; Temple University; Columbia University
- Awards: Frank J. Goodnow Award; U.S. Army Distinguished Civilian Service Medal
- Scientific career
- Fields: Political science
- Workplaces: Florida International University; San Francisco State University; University of Wisconsin; University of California, Los Angeles; University of Southern California

Judith Hicks Stiehm (born October 9, 1935) is an American political scientist. She is a professor of political science at Florida International University. She studies civil-military relations in the United States, processes of social change, and the status of women. She has published books on the effectiveness of nonviolent resistance, the results of mandated orders to admit women to the United States Air Force Academy, and the functioning of the U.S. Army War College. She was the first woman to be a university provost in State University System of Florida.

== Education and positions ==
Stiehm attended the University of Wisconsin, where she earned a BA degree in East Asian Studies. She then graduated from Temple University with an MA in American history, and in 1969 she obtained a PhD in political theory from Columbia University.

Stiehm has held positions at San Francisco State University, the University of Wisconsin, the University of California, Los Angeles, and the University of Southern California, where she served as the vice provost. She has also held visiting or temporary positions at The U.S. Army Peacekeeping Institute and at the Strategic Studies Institute at Carlisle Barracks, and was a distinguished visiting professor at the United States Air Force Academy.

Stiehm has served as the provost and academic vice president of Florida International University. She was the first woman to be the provost of Florida International University, and as of 2019 she had been the only one. This made her the first woman to be a provost in the State University System of Florida.

== Research ==
In 1972, Stiehm published the book Nonviolent Power: Active and Passive Resistance. In Nonviolent Power, Stiehm studies the uses of nonviolent resistance and its potential as a tool for social change, focusing on how its use is misunderstood and what the characteristics of successful nonviolent resistance are. She discusses the history of nonviolent resistance in American politics, then studies the connection between nonviolent resistance and other doctrines on the just uses of violence, and the role of nonviolence in a democracy.

Stiehm has also published multiple books on the situation of women in the U.S. military: she authored Bring Me Men and Women: Mandated Change at the U.S. Air Force Academy (1981) and Arms and the Enlisted Woman (1989), and edited It's Our Military Too!: Women and the US Military (1996). Bring Me Men and Women studies the mandated introduction of women cadets into the United States Air Force Academy and the institution's response to that change. Arms and the Enlisted Woman studies the situation of women in the United States military and makes specific recommendations to increase their involvement in military planning and operations, and was published at a time when this was a strong contrast with the military's approach.

In 2002, she wrote U.S. Army War College: Military Education in a Democracy. This book is a detailed description of the history, classes, faculty, and administration of The U.S. Army War College, drawn from a year that Stiehm spent as an observer there, which makes recommendations for improvements to the functioning of the college.

In 2006, Stiehm published the book Champions for Peace: Women Winners of the Nobel Prize for Peace. The book is motivated by the apparent contradiction that peacemaking has traditionally been portrayed as a feminine activity, and yet by that point only 12 women had won the Nobel Peace Prize in more than 100 years. In Champions for Peace, Stiehm writes a biographical sketch of each of those 12 winners, studying the varied backgrounds that led women to become highly successful advocates for peace.

Stiehm received the 2008 Frank J. Goodnow Award from The American Political Science Association, which is awarded to recognize "outstanding service to the political science community and to the Association". She also holds the U.S. Army Distinguished Civilian Service Medal.

Stiehm has published work related to her research in media outlets like The Washington Post, and her work has been cited in outlets including The National Interest and Lawfare.

== Selected works ==
- Nonviolent Power: Active and Passive Resistance (1972)
- Bring Me Men and Women: Mandated Change at the U.S. Air Force Academy (1981)
- Arms and the Enlisted Woman (1989)
- U.S. Army War College: Military Education in a Democracy (2002)
- Champions for Peace: Women Winners of the Nobel Prize for Peace (2006)

== Selected awards ==
- Frank J. Goodnow Award, American Political Science Association
- U.S. Army Distinguished Civilian Service Medal
