= Feminism in international relations =

Academic field of study in international politics

Feminism is a broad term given to works of those scholars who have sought to bring gender concerns into the academic study of international politics and who have used feminist theory and sometimes queer theory to better understand global politics and international relations as a whole.

== Feminist IR theory ==
In terms of international relations (IR) theory, a feminist approach is grouped in the broad category of theoretical approaches known as reflectivism, representing a divergence from approaches adhering to a rationalist outlook based on the premises of rational choice theory; reflectivist approaches, which also include constructivism, post-structuralism, and postcolonialism, regard state identities and interests as continuously in flux so that norms and identity play as much a role in shaping policy as material interests.

One of the most influential works in feminist IR is Cynthia Enloe's Bananas, Beaches, and Bases (Pandora Press 1990). This text sought to chart the many different roles that women play in international politics – as plantation sector workers, diplomatic wives, sex workers on military bases, etc. The important point of this work was to emphasize how, when looking at international politics from the perspective of women, one is forced to reconsider their assumptions regarding what international politics is 'all about'.

However, it would be a mistake to think that feminist IR was solely a matter of identifying how many groups of women are positioned in the international political system. From its inception, feminist IR has always shown a strong concern with thinking about men and, in particular, masculinities. Indeed, many IR feminists argue that the discipline is inherently masculine. For example, in her article "Sex and Death in the Rational World of Defense Intellectuals" Signs (1988), Carol Cohn claimed that a highly masculinized culture within the defense establishment contributed to the divorcing of war from human emotion.

Feminist IR theory involves looking at how international politics affects and is affected by both men and women and also at how the core concepts that are employed within the discipline of IR (e.g. war, security, etc.) are themselves gendered. Feminist IR has not only concerned itself with the traditional focus of IR on states, wars, diplomacy, and security, but feminist IR scholars have also emphasized the importance of looking at how gender shapes the current global political economy. In this sense, there is no clear-cut division between feminists working in IR and those working in the area of International Political Economy (IPE).

== Emergence of Feminist IR ==
Feminist IR emerged largely from the late 1980s onwards. The end of the Cold War and the re-evaluation of traditional IR theory during the 1990s opened up a space for gendering International Relations. Because feminist IR is linked broadly to the critical project in IR, by and large, most feminist scholarship has sought to problematize the politics of knowledge construction within the discipline - often by adopting methodologies of deconstructivism associated with postmodernism/poststructuralism. However, the growing influence of feminist and women-centric approaches within the international policy communities (for example, at the World Bank and the United Nations) is more reflective of the liberal feminist emphasis on equality of opportunity for women.

In regards to feminism in International Relations, some of the founding feminist IR scholars refer to using a "feminist consciousness" when looking at gender issues in politics. In Cynthia Enloe's article “Gender is not enough: the need for a feminist consciousness”, Enloe explains how International Relations needs to include masculinity in the discussion on war, while also giving attention to the issues surrounding women and girls. In order to do so, Enloe urges International Relations scholars to look at issues with a ‘feminist consciousness’, which will ultimately include a perspective sensitive to masculinities and femininities. In this way, the feminist consciousness, together with a gendered lens, allows for IR academics to discuss International Politics with a deeper appreciation and understanding of issues pertaining to gender around the world.

Enloe argues how the IR discipline continues to lack serious analysis of the experiences, actions, and ideas of girls and women in the international arena and how this ultimately excludes them from the discussion in IR. For instance, Enloe explains Carol Cohn's experience using a feminist consciousness while participating in the drafting of a document that outlines the actions taken in negotiating ceasefires, peace agreements, and new constitutions. During this event, those involved came up with the word “combatant” to describe those in need during these usually high-strung negotiations. The use of ‘combatant’ in this context is particularly problematic as Carol points out because it implies one type of militarized people, generally men carrying guns, and excludes the women and girls deployed as porters, cooks, and forced ‘wives’ of male combatants. This term effectively renders the needs of these women invisible and excludes them from the particularly critical IR conversation regarding who needs what in war and peace. This discussion is crucial for the analysis of how various masculinities are at play in International Politics and how those masculinities affect women and girls during wartime and peace and initially eliminates them from the discussion.

Conversely, feminist IR scholar Charlotte Hooper effectively applies a feminist consciousness when considering how “IR disciplines men as much as men shape IR”. So, instead of focusing on what and whom IR excludes from the conversation, Hooper focuses on how masculine identities are perpetuated and ultimately are the products of the practice of IR. In this way, it is ineffective to use a gendered lens and feminist consciousness to analyze the exclusion of a discussion in gender in IR. Hooper suggests that a deeper examination of the ontological and epistemological ways in which IR has been inherently a masculine discipline is needed. The innate masculinity of IR is because men compose the vast majority of modern IR scholars, and their masculine identities have been socially constructed over time through various political progressions. For instance, Hooper gives examples of the historical and political developments of masculinities that are still prevalent in IR and society at large; the Greek citizen/warrior model, the Judeo Christian model, and the Protestant bourgeois rationalist model. These track the masculine identities throughout history, where manliness is measured in militarism and citizenship, ownership and authority of the fathers, and finally, competitive individualism and reason. These masculinities in turn ask one to not only use the feminist consciousness to analyze the exclusions of femininities from IR, but additionally, Hooper illuminates how one can locate the inherent inclusions of masculinities in the field of IR with a feminist consciousness.

== Gender and war ==
A prominent basis for much of feminist scholarship on war is to emphasize how men are seen as the sole actors in war. Women, on the other hand, are commonly conceived of as acted upon throughout conflict and conflict resolutions. As asserted by Swati Parashar, they are documented as “grieving widows and mothers, selfless nurses, and anti-war activists”. The reality is that women play various roles in war and for different reasons, depending on the conflict. It is noted that women have actively participated in war since the mid-nineteenth century. This process of eliminating women from war is a tool used to discredit women as agents in the international arena. A focal point for many feminist scholars is mass rape during wartime. These scholars will seek to explain why wartime sexual violence is so prevalent throughout history and today. Some scholars turn to explanations such as rape as a weapon or as a reward for soldiers during the war. Others see sexual violence as an inevitable consequence when social restraints are removed. Feminist scholarship has also critiqued mainstream IR theories and the field of international relations for failing to study war in depth.

=== Feminist anti-militarism ===
Feminists within IR often look to how conceptions of masculinity have shaped foreign policy, state identity, and security and armament during and outside of warfare. One tradition that exists within the field for this purpose is that of feminist anti-militarism. This is a stance within Feminist International Relations that opposes weapons of mass destruction, such as nuclear weaponry, and holds gender accountable in part for the propagation of militarism. Gender becomes embedded in relations of power as that which is seen to be stronger is assigned a masculinized identity, while concepts such as emotion are seen as indicators of weakness and become associated with femininity. In this way, the military strength and capability of a state becomes associated with its degree of masculinity, which feminist anti-militarists see as problematic. As disarmament could be perceived as emasculatory, states are less likely to disarm; consequently, militarism becomes normalized, downplayed, and more likely to incite warfare. These are some of the concepts that Carol Cohn and Sara Ruddick explored in their article “Feminist Ethical Perspective on Weapons of Mass Destruction,” (2003) which laid out the meaning behind what they referred to as “anti-war feminism”. They explain that it opposes the use of weapons of mass destruction whether for military, political, or deterring purposes, yet that it differs from pacifism in that it does not outright reject all forms of warfare. Such opposition stems partly from the questionability of how effective warfare/militarism is, and whether the costs, (albeit monetary, environmental, and especially human) that are inevitably incurred yet not always accounted, for are worth it.

Manifestations of feminist anti-militarism can be identified in various contexts and methods. In line with Cohn and Ruddick's (2003) aforementioned article, part of what feminist anti-militarism critiques is the framework in which weapons of mass destruction are “discussed”. Such discourse assumedly would have large influence in the outcome, as investigated by Cohn in one of her earlier articles, “Sex and Death in the Rational World of Defense Intellectuals." Her participation in security discussions allowed her to observe the way in which the “technostrategic” language used by American defense intellectuals was highly gendered, and assigned greater value and strength to that which was assigned masculine or highly sexualized terminology. While Cohn does not explicitly identify the use of a feminist anti-militarist view in this article, the ideas and subjects at hand run parallel. Relatedly, Claire Duncanson and Catherine Eschle do state their use of a feminist anti-militarist perspective in their article “Gender and the Nuclear Weapons State: A Feminist Critique of the UK Government’s White Paper on Trident”. The authors borrow Cohn's rendition of the relationship between gender and nuclear weapons to examine the way in which discourses are shaped by underlying dichotomous views of masculinity and femininity. This perspective is then applied to the renewal of Trident nuclear weapons, a plan which Duncanson and Eschl argue is enabled by the UK government's use of masculinized language that seems to be constructed into the state's identity. The UK Trident Program was the cause of another expression of feminist anti-militarism, beginning a few decades earlier in the form of the Greenham Common Women's Peace Camp. The 1979 decision by NATO to base ground cruise missiles at Greenham Common initiated a response from women largely associated with various feminist and anti-nuclear groups. Their opposition to such militarism was demonstrated in the persistence of peace camps, demonstrations and other forms of resistance for the following two decades (nat. archive website). Such efforts brought to life the feminist anti-militarist perception of the relationship between gender and militarism as exhibited through nuclear weaponry.

Gender theory highlights the limitations of linguistic categories, asserts the significance of intersectionality, values concrete cultural context over universalisms and essentialisms (for example, the notion of universal patriarchy), rigorously problematizes sex and gender binaries, recounts and accounts for the history of sex and gender relations, and deals directly with other theoretical strains such as structuralism, post-structuralism, socialism, and psychoanalysis. For example, in her book Gender Trouble: Feminism and the Subversion of Identity, Judith Butler explores the possibility of troubling gender first by examining conventional understandings of gender that support masculine hegemony and heterosexist power, and subsequently wondering about the extent to which one can undermine such constitutive categories (that is, male/female, man/woman) through continually mobilizing, subverting, and proliferating the very foundational illusions of identity which seek to keep gender in its place. Gender theory can inform critical lenses and perspectives such as Cynthia Enloe's “feminist consciousness,” as well as other feminist perspectives such as liberal feminism, difference feminism, and poststructuralist feminism. In terms of feminist international relations, gender theory engages directly with the notion of mainstreaming gender in both institutional politics and discursive politics.

Liberal feminism deals specifically with policy-making, and requires that women as well as perspectives on both women's and men's lived realities are fairly included and represented in that policy-making. With regard to liberal feminism, gender theory contemplates, for example, what is meant by the term “women,” whose perspectives on “women’s” and “men’s” lived realities are considered valuable in facilitating fair representation in policy-making, and what aspects of life are considered components of “lived reality”.

Difference feminism focusses on empowering women in particular through specific designs, implementations, and evaluations of policies that account for the material and cultural differences between men and women and their significance. With regard to difference feminism, gender theory questions, again, what is meant by the term “women;” what factors might lead to “women” requiring specific designs, implementations, and evaluations of policies; what is considered to constitute “difference” in the material and cultural experience of “men” and “women;” and what aspects of that “difference” suppose its especial significance.

Poststructuralist feminism prioritizes difference and diversity to the extent that it recognizes all identities as absolutely contingent social constructions. With regard to poststructuralist feminism, gender theory points out that due to this ontological and epistemological discursiveness, poststructuralist feminism can, in some cases, risk understanding the subjects in policy-making as distinct social subjectivities primarily and/or exclusively in terms of gender difference, rather than in terms of the multiplicities of difference that comprise subjectivities in poststructural feminist thought. Discourse starts with the assertion that the public/private divide has meaningfully contributed to women's marginalization. In order to disrupt this marginalization, feminists must challenge the very assumptions that construct our ideas of identity and citizenship. Primarily, poststructuralist feminism seeks to advance Judith Butler's conception of gender as ‘performative’, whereby there is no pertinent conception of gender outside of the social construction of masculinity or femininity.

Rationalist feminism parallels Neorealist thought by placing the state as the primary actor within international relations. It is also linked to Liberal thought, insofar as it highlights ‘democratic peace’ literature, creating an overlap between the paradigms. Relating to gender, rationalist feminism explores not only how war arises, but specifically how gender affects the causes, likelihood and outcome of conflict. Rationalist feminists have, broadly, two strains of research: quantitative foreign policy and comparative case studies. Quantitative foreign policy - may, for example, explore the correlation between gender equality and likelihood of war, or the gender gap on foreign policy opinions.

Comparative case studies - may, for example, include looking at sex-selective abortions in different states, the policies that lead to gender disparity and the consequences of such gender disparity.

Institutional politics describes the political, material, bureaucratic, and organizational relationships and conventions that govern administrative institutions. Gender theory seeks to examine the ways in which these normalized relationships and conventions shape the policy-making processes of and within these institutions.

Discursive politics refers to the ways in which institutionalized norms, policy procedures, organizational identities, and material structures shape the language and meaning of gender equality and/or difference therein. Gender theory, with regard to discursive politics, for instance, would examine the identities, the constitutive categories, created and/or perpetuated by the language and meaning of gender equality and/or difference in such international institutions.

== Barriers to femininities and female bodies ==
There are different theories that come into play on femininity and female's bodies when speaking about International Relations and the role females have within it. One theory known as a ‘constructivist’ account of gender, lends itself to arguing that your sex is biological, that is, you are born with it, thus being natural and your gender is something that is social, or learned within the constructs of society. A feminist approach to international relations also provides analyses for not only theoretical understandings of gender relations, but also the consequences that perpetuate the subordination of femininities and female-bodies. ‘Women’ (female bodies + performed femininities) endure a higher level of criticism for their actions, personalities, and behaviours within the public and private spheres, particularly while running for political office, whether this at the local or national levels. This is due to a perception of politically ambitious women as either being too feminine or too masculine, to be capable of the job that certain offices demand. This is typically linked to the ideal that women will take care of ‘women’s issues’, such as education and abortion, while men will take care of ‘men’s issues’ such as the military, national security, and the economy. This way of thinking can be attributed to the ‘essentialist’ account of gender and plays into the deeply held belief by many in our society that both men and women inherently hold true to their ‘essence’ of either being feminine or masculine. Women are often viewed as being a caring nurturer in comparison to most men being viewed as aggressive and brash. It is critical that researchers seek to explain further the barriers that women endure in their attempts to attain political office on any level. To begin with, there must be a consideration of women's socioeconomic status, and thus a difficulty in funding a campaign. While women are more educated in the western world than ever before, the average woman's socioeconomic powers still do not match the average man's. This results in a further consequence for women, as employment is positively related to one's ability to attain political information, and to build internal political efficacy. Thus, not only does socioeconomic status lead to a lesser ability to finance a political campaign for women, but it also leads to lower levels of political efficacy, impacting women's participation in politics from the very beginning.

Further barriers exist into women's entrance into politics, which include, but are not limited to, attachment to the private sphere and the scrutiny of the media. Media coverage of campaigns can be particularly detrimental to a woman's ability to attain political office. The media focuses far more on physical appearance and lifestyle, rather than the prominent political questions of the campaign, for female candidates. Further, women receive less overall media coverage, the media questions women's abilities and potential for future power, as well as focusing on what are deemed as ‘women’s issues’. These kinds of coverage discourage voters from voting or contributing to the campaigns of female candidates, and moreover, discourage women from entering into a campaign. Thus, the media has demonstrated its ability to deem candidates either capable or ill-suited for political office, simply through the dialogue in which they use, that perpetuates systems of disqualification for women. These dialogues place men in positions of high politics, and reinforce symbolic understandings of ‘women’s issues’ versus ‘men’s issues’, and who best represents offices of high-politics due to naturalized understandings of individual's bodies and gendered identities. Through a feminist lens of international relations however, we may understand the systemic nature of these perceptions of the relationships between bodies and identities in order to discount popular dialogue, and find places for women within high-politics. The way forward would be for people to create their own ‘feminist curiosity’ in order to challenge the status quo and push forward on the stage of Feminism in the International Relations Arena. To view gender as ‘performative’ instead of just something we are born with or into. To pull from Judith Butler's work and view “the sexed body as much a product of discourses about gender as discourse about gender are a product of the sexed body.”

== Critique ==
Certain parts of the academic realm of IR theory did not offer the feminist perspective serious attention because of differences with its ways of addressing problems within the discipline. Some circles within social sciences are increasingly employing a hypothetico-deductivist way of looking at social phenomena. In that context, feminist perspective is criticized for providing a more politically engaged way of looking at issues than a problem-solving way. Robert Keohane has suggested that feminists formulate verifiable problems, collect data, and proceed only scientifically when attempting to solve issues. Unsurprisingly, Keohane's suggestion received a cold reaction from feminists; one particular rebuttal was entitled “You Still Don’t Understand: Why Troubled Engagements Continue between Feminists and (Critical) IPE.”

Brown University political scientist Rose McDermott has criticized feminist IR literature as being too exclusively focused on narrative, experiential and qualitative analysis, and for using causal models that are underspecified. In a 2015 article in International Organization, she writes, "Feminists often relegate quantitative work to the realm of male influence and experience, even considering it false consciousness in succumbing to male methods of power, thereby surrendering powerful methods and models that could be leveraged to further substantiate the arguments made by feminist analysis regarding inequities in outcome by sex."

== Feminist foreign policy ==
Feminist foreign policies in general have been increasingly implemented since the mid-2010s, with countries such as France and Mexico recently announcing their plans to implement this kind of policy in 2019 and 2020 respectively. The area of foreign policy where there tends to be the most gender mainstreaming is foreign development and aid. This type of foreign policy focuses on women's empowerment to tackle issues such as poverty and human rights abuses in global south countries. General criticisms of feminist foreign policies that have been put forth by global north countries include the fact that other areas of their foreign policy perpetuates violence towards women, most considerably arms sales. Another critique is that it causes women to be viewed as weak and maternal and in need of protection. It also does not include gender non-conforming people, who also face many of the same issues as women in conflict such as sexualized violence as well as their own unique challenges and discrimination that is not being addressed in these policies.

=== Canada ===
In 2017, Canada launched its new foreign assistance plan, Canada’s Feminist International Assistance Policy. The policy describes where Canada's budget for foreign will be allocated, and Canada chose to focus on putting money towards initiatives that support women in the global south. The policy outlines six action areas that Canada intends to focus on: Human dignity, growth that works for everyone, environment and climate change, inclusive governance, peace and security and the main core focus of gender equality and the empowerment of women and girls. These action areas align with the UN Sustainable Development Goals for 2030, with a focus on goal number 5 which is gender equality. Canada’s Feminist International Assistance Policy states that its overall goal is the eradication of poverty and that the most effective approach to achieve this goal is the promotion of gender equality.

Canada's new policy stems from the concept of gender mainstreaming, which means that gender is at the forefront of a given initiative, and this concept has been utilized in discussions surrounding foreign aid for the past decade. The first major landmark international legislation that included gender mainstreaming was the United Nations Resolution 1325 that was passed in the year 2000. Part of this resolution is the Women Peace and Security agenda which has goals including: Support for sexual violence survivors as well as supporting women's involvement in peace processes. Canada's policy focuses on the empowerment of women, which emerged in the discussion of development in the 1980s and 1990s, but at the time was considered a radical concept. The goal in promoting the empowerment of women is to give them confidence to challenge social norms that may be harmful to their community as well as to change gendered power relations.

== See also ==
- Feminism in 1950s Britain
- International legal theory
- Embedded Feminism
