= Carol Cohn =

American researcher focused in issues of gender and security

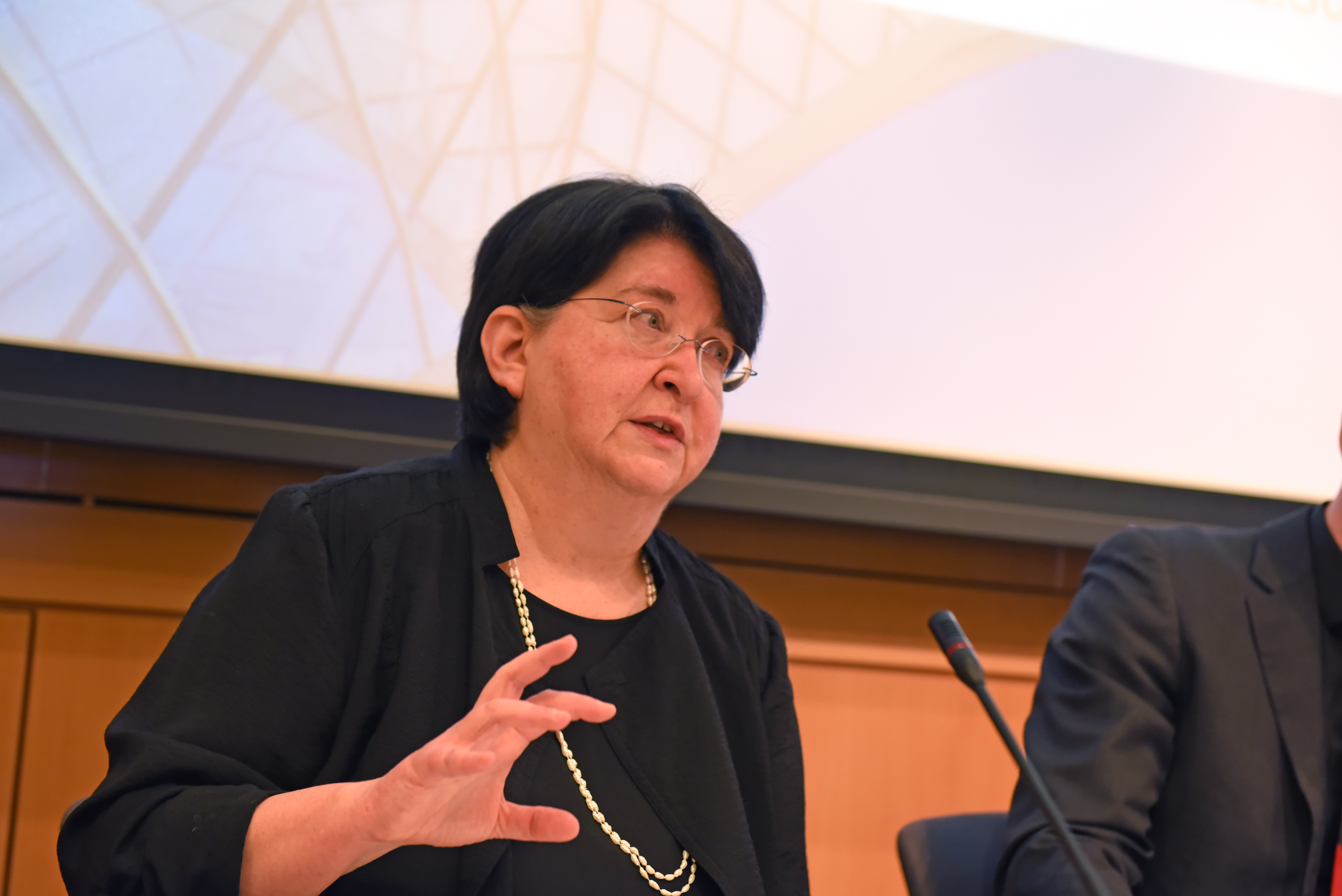
Carol Cohn participating in a panel called "After War, Gender Equality Needs Investment Too" sponsored by the U.S. Institute of Peace. (March 2017).

Carol Cohn is the founding director of the Consortium on Gender, Security and Human Rights and a Lecturer of Women's Studies at the University of Massachusetts Boston. Cohn is recognised for addressing issues of gender in global politics, particularly conflict and security issues. She has published in academic and policy contexts with major research interests lying in the realm of gender and armed conflict, the gendered discourses of US national security elites and gender mainstreaming in international security institutions. In addition to her research, Cohn facilitates training and workshops for United Nations Security Council Resolution 1325 and has been active in the NGO Working Group on Women, Peace and Security since 2001. Taken wholly, Cohn's career includes a stance described as feminist anti-militarism. In 2013, Cohn edited a well-received collection of essays on the topic of women and war in which it is argued that the topic of war cannot be understood without understanding gender dynamics.

== Important writings ==
=== Sex and Death in the Rational World of Defense Intellectuals ===
In her 1987 article, "Sex and Death in the Rational World of Defense Intellectuals," Cohn discussed the language and imagery used in defense professionals discourse with a concentrated focus on the sexual subtext used and the extensive use of abstract language and euphemisms. Terms such as "collateral damage" replacing "loss of life" and "RV's" in place of "nuclear bombs" are argued to demonstrate the abstract language used by defense intellectuals. Cohn argues that sexualized language including terms such as vertical "erector launchers", "thrust to weight ratios", "soft lay downs", "deep penetration", and "orgasmic whumps" are common place in nuclear weaponry and strategy conversations. Cohn links the domesticated and humanized language and imagery as a way for defense professionals to distance themselves from the reality and anxiety of war. Additionally, the 'technostrategic' language that is used is a way to restrict debate solely to defense intellectuals and professionals who are versed in the language. It is argued that this effectively dismisses and silences voices from outside the military and nuclear sphere. Cohn suggests that the reference point of the language revolves around the weapons themselves, thus, because the language is designed to talk about weapons there is no way that concerns of human life or society can be legitimately expressed. If it is not part of the language these values or concerns are effectively dismissed or deemed illegitimate. This piece demonstrates how important language is and how it can be gendered. It brings up questions about language relating to whom it allows communications with and what it allows one to think as well as say. Moreover, she argues ”learning the language changes her thinking. She finds she cannot express concerns about human suffering or ethics because the language has no legitimate place for them. Questions about civilians or bodies become “irrelevant,” “unprofessional,” or “outside the realm of expertise”.

=== Wars, Wimps, and Women: Talking Gender and Thinking War ===
In "Wars, Wimps, and Women: Talking Gender and Thinking War", Cohn focuses her essay concerning the language of defense intellectuals on a concept she describes as “gendered discourse”: a set of intertwined words, images, and associations that form the basis of how we perceive ourselves as men and women. One aspect of gendered discourse that Cohn gives particular attention to is the dichotomies within language that have a manifest relationship to the dichotomy of masculinity and femininity. In dichotomies such as “logic to intuition” and “abstraction to particularity” not only is the first half of the dichotomy associated with masculinity but is also perceived as the superior quality of the two in terms of both power and status. According to Cohn, one detrimental side effect of this gendered discourse is that the only way anyone can be perceived as legitimate in the world of defense intellectuals is to “talk like a man” and exhibit the more valued traits on the masculine side of characteristic dichotomies, a practice that stymies dialogue and limits the influence of valuable perspectives on national security issues of dire importance. As Cohn traces this deficiency in diverse perspectives back to the gendered discourse that preemptively deters any perspective perceived as feminine, the solution, Cohn argues, is not simply to bring more women into the war room but to encourage both men and women to reexamine the ideas and values that have hitherto been silenced.

== Publications ==
- "Slick ‘ems, Glick ‘ems, Christmas Trees, and Cookie Cutters: Nuclear Language and How We Learned to Pat the Bomb," Bulletin of the Atomic Scientists, June 1987.
- "Sex and Death in the Rational World of Defense Intellectuals," Signs: Journal of Women in Culture and Society, vol. 12, no. 4 (Summer 1987).
- "Wars, Wimps, and Women: Talking Gender and Thinking War" in Gendering War Talk, edited by Miriam Cooke and Angela Woollacott (Princeton, NJ: Princeton University Press, 1993).
- "Gays in the Military: Texts and Subtexts," in The "Man" Question in International Relations, edited by Marysia Zalewski and Jane Parpart (Boulder, CO: Westview Press, 1998).
- "‘How can She Claim Equal Rights When She Doesn’t Have to Do as Many Pushups as I Do?’: The Framing of Men's Opposition to Women's Equality in the Military," Men and Masculinities, vol. 3, no.2 (October 2000).
- "A Conversation with Cynthia Enloe: Feminists Look at Masculinity and Men Who Wage War," Signs vol. 28, no.4, p. 1187-1207 (2003).
- “Feminist Peacemaking,” The Women's Review of Books, vol. XXI, no.5 (February 2004), pp. 8–9.
- “A Feminist Ethical Perspective on Weapons of Mass Destruction,” (with Sara Ruddick) In Ethics and Weapons of Mass Destruction: Religious and Secular Perspectives, eds. Sohail H. Hashmi and Steven P. Lee (Cambridge: Cambridge University Press, 2004).
- A paper for the Weapons of Mass Destruction Commission head by Dr. Hans Blix, “The Relevance of Gender for Eliminating Weapons of Mass Destruction” (with Felicity Hill and Sara Ruddick), also published in Disarmament Diplomacy, issue no. 80, Autumn 2005.
- “Motives and Methods: Using Multi-Cited Ethnography to Study National Security Discourses,” in Feminist Methodologies for International Relations, eds. Brooke Ackerly and Jacqui True, (Cambridge: Cambridge University Press, 2006).
- "Mainstreaming Gender in UN Security Policy: A Path to Political Transformation?" in Global Governance: Feminist Perspectives, eds. Shirin M. Rai and Georgina Waylen (London: Palgrave, 2008). ISBN 9780230537040
- Women and Wars (Cambridge: Polity Press, 2013). ISBN 9780745642444
- "'Maternal thinking' and the Concept of 'vulnerability' in Security Paradigms, Policies, and Practices," Journal of International Political Theory, vol. 10, no. 1 (February 2014).
