= Cynthia Enloe =

American feminist writer, theorist, and professor (born 1938)

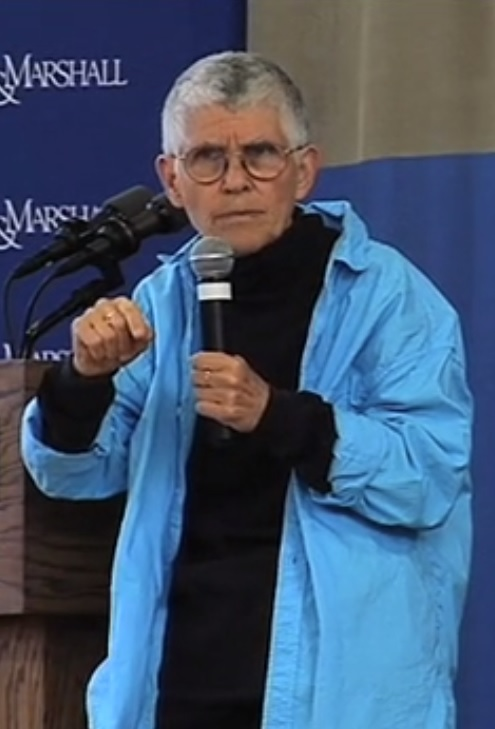
- Enloe speaks at Franklin & Marshall College in 2014
- Born: Cynthia Holden Enloe; 16 July 1938 (age 88); New York City, U.S.
- Occupations: Political theorist, feminist writer and professor
- Spouse: Joni Seager
- Awards: Fulbright Scholarship (1965); Susan Strange Award (2007)

Academic background
- Education: Connecticut College (BA); University of California, Berkeley (MA, PhD)
- Thesis: Multi-Ethnic Politics: The Case of Malaysia (1967)
- Doctoral advisor: Chalmers Johnson

Academic work
- Discipline: Political science
- Institutions: University of California, Berkeley; Miami University; Clark University: Harvard University; Radcliffe Institute
- Notable works: Bananas, Beaches and Bases

Cynthia Holden Enloe (born July 16, 1938) is an American political theorist, feminist writer, and a professor emeritus at Clark University. She is best known for her work on gender and militarism and for her contributions to the field of feminist international relations. She has also influenced the field of feminist political geography, with feminist geopolitics in particular.

== Biography ==
Cynthia Enloe was born in New York City and grew up in Manhasset, Long Island, a New York suburb. Her father was from Missouri and went to medical school in Germany. Her mother went to Mills College and married Cynthia's father upon graduation.

After completing her undergraduate education at Connecticut College in 1960, she went on to earn an M.A. in 1963 and a Ph.D. in 1967 in political science at the University of California, Berkeley. While at Berkeley, Enloe was the first woman ever to be a Head TA for Aaron Wildavsky, then an up-and-coming star in the field of American Politics. For much of her professional life she taught at Clark University in Worcester, Massachusetts. At Clark, Enloe served as Chair of the Department of Political Science and as Director of Women's Studies. She also served on the university's Committee on Personnel and its Planning and Budget Review Committee. Enloe was awarded Clark University's Outstanding Teacher Award on three separate occasions.

At the beginning of her career, Enloe mainly focused on studying ethnic and racial politics. She completed her dissertation in Malaysia on a Fulbright Scholarship from 1965 to 1966. There, she researched the country's ethnic politics. Ten years after receiving her PhD, Enloe had written six books on the subject of ethnical tensions and its role in politics; however, she had yet to look at any of these subjects from a feminist angle, something she admits being "embarrassed of". It was not until she first began teaching at Clark University, in the middle of the U.S.-Vietnam war, that Enloe really began to develop her feminist thought. She spoke with a colleague at Clark, the only man on the faculty who was a veteran, about his experiences during the Vietnam war. He mentioned that Vietnamese women were hired by American soldiers to do their laundry. Enloe began to wonder how history would be different if the entire war had been told through the eyes of these Vietnamese women.

Ever since, Enloe's work has primarily focused upon how feminist and gendered politics have shaped the national and international conversations. Enloe focuses on the unfair treatment of women in globalized factory and the many ways in which women are exploited for their labor. She also critiques global as well as U.S. militarization, specifically the roles women play in combat. Enloe is not afraid to address security from a feminist perspective. She argues that the U.S. military model trains men to be the protectors of women and then produces an environment in which women are the victims of physical violence. One of Enloe's many contributions to feminist writings has been her coining of the term "feminist curiosity". It came about in 2003. when Enloe was giving a talk at Ochanomizu University, a historic women's university in Tokyo, Japan. She has said that she wanted to come up with a phrase that she felt could be understood in both English and Japanese, as her lecture was being translated for those who attended. Enloe created this idea of "feminist curiosity" as a way of saying that feminism is about the questions you ask, not just the answers you give.

Having retired from Clark, Enloe is a research professor in the Department of International Development, Community, and Environment and is still a frequent and energetic lecturer. In addition to serving on the editorial board for scholarly journals such as Signs and the International Feminist Journal of Politics, Enloe has written fifteen books, mostly published by the University of California Press. Much of Enloe's research centers on women's place in national and international politics. Her books cover a wide range of issues encompassing gender-based discrimination as well as racial, ethnic, and national identities. She is also a member of the academic network of the Women's International League for Peace and Freedom.

Enloe states that she has been influenced by many other feminists who use an ethnographic approach, specifically, Seung-Kyung Kim's (1997) work on South Korean women factory workers during the pro-democracy campaign and Anne Allison's 1994 work on observing corporate businessmen's interactions with hostesses in a Tokyo drinking club, Nightwork: Sexuality, Pleasure, and Corporate Masculinity in a Tokyo Hostess Club. Enloe has also listed Diane Singerman, Purnima Mankekar, and Cathy Lutz as people who have inspired and influenced her work. When asked how she defines feminism for herself, Enloe stated that "Feminism is the pursuit of deep, deep justice for women in ways that change the behaviors of both women and men, and really change our notions of what justice looks like." She has been awarded honorary doctorates by Union College (2005), the University of London's School of Oriental and African Studies (2009), Connecticut College (2010), the University of Lund, Sweden (2012), and Clark University (2014).

She currently lives in Boston, Massachusetts, with partner Joni Seager.

== Publications ==
=== Bananas, Beaches and Bases ===
Bananas, Beaches, and Bases: Making Feminist Sense of International Politics (first published by Pandora Press in 1989, with a revised edition published in 2014) presents sexism as a prevalent issue and gives readers a look at the history of such commonplace components of the modern world as the tourism industry. Enloe displays the links between women of different cultures during the 1800s. Enloe discusses colonialism in light of the typically held perceptions of the masculine West and the feminine East. Discussing women from varied cultures, Enloe investigates how Muslim women, among others, felt compelled to validate their cultural practices in the face of Orientalism. This book argues that lack of understanding of foreign cultures and fascination with the differences in clothing and lifestyles of indigenous and colonial populations contributed to their continued subjugation.

Bananas Beaches and Bases conveys the issues that feminist movements face because of nationalism and socially instilled masculinity after years of Western colonialism. International politics have worked against feminist movements because of the long lasting influences of colonialism. The antiquated ideas of colonialism have complicated the goals of the feminist cause. Colonialism encouraged Western countries to believe they were superior to non Western countries, ultimately leading to Western men believing they were superior to women. During Western colonialism women were treated as sexual symbols of exploration, postcards specifically. Westerner exploration and tourism went hand in hand with the exploitation of women.

Women who were invested in the ideas of nationalism were not valued as valid participants. Additionally, women wearing veils became a question of nationalism. European colonizers saw the veil in Muslim countries as a symbol of female seclusion. Then arose the question of whether Muslim women should demonstrate their commitment to the nationalist cause by wearing the veil or throwing it away.

Bananas Beaches and Bases reinforces the fact that masculinity has been used to create a patriarchal system, leading to male dominance over women. Militarization during wartime has reinforced masculinized social order. The war in Vietnam which re-masculinized America serves as an example of how gender and warfare became intertwined through specific gender roles during war. In her writing, Enloe uses Afghanistan as an example of how national militarization was harmful towards women trying to establish a presence in nationalist movements. Afghani women living in rural communities were caught in war and were in danger of bombings or exile. The militarization in Afghanistan emphasized the importance of unity and "national survival", this emphasis silenced women in the nationalist movements. National militarization benefited men and oppressed women who were seeking to change the patriarchal structure in place. The enforcement of world order through militarization consequently reinforced the influences of masculinity, further challenging feminist efforts to equalize society.

Enloe continues to illustrate the struggle that feminist movements face in international politics through the domestic service industry. Enloe states that "domestic work is international business with political implications." During the Industrial Revolution, female domestic workers were in high demand because middle class women believed they needed to protect their own femininity from manual labor. From the time of the Industrial Revolution to modern day, female domestic workers have faced the challenges of being treated as subordinate to the middle class. Female domestic workers continue to have the responsibility of providing for family abroad while facing increasingly strict immigration laws and restrictions from the International Monetary Fund.

Bananas Beaches and Bases illustrates how feminist movements have been at a disadvantage because of colonial influences and patriarchal driven societal structures. These colonial influences have cause women to be viewed as sexual objects, disregarded as part of nationalist movements and looked down upon in the domestic service industry. Enloe brings to light the idea that in order for feminist movements to succeed we must support organizations seeking rights for women along with ridding the world of the obsolete colonialist thought in which men run the world. Through Bananas, Beaches and Bases the public is able to better understand the dynamics of sexual politics.

"No commentator has done more than Cynthia Enloe to explore the numerous roles that ordinary women play in the international system and global political economy -- as industrial and domestic workers; activists; diplomats and soldiers; wives of diplomats and soldiers; sex workers; and much else besides," wrote Adam Jones in his review of Maneuvers in the journal Contemporary Politics. In Maneuvers: The International Politics of Militarizing Women's Lives Enloe elaborates upon the theme of militarization and how governments utilize women's labor in the process of preparing for and fighting wars.

=== The Curious Feminist ===
In The Curious Feminist: Searching for Women in the New Age of Empire (2004) Enloe pays particular attention to the effect of globalization on women's labor and wage ratios. This book not only addresses women's roles in economic markets, world conflicts, and power politics, but also shows Enloe's particular interest in linking these themes to women's everyday lives. She addresses themes similar to those in Bananas, Beaches and Bases, but in this book she also discusses how she became interested in becoming a feminist. She asserts that curiosity as a feminist means that no woman's life should be beyond the scope of her interest. She also focuses on the influence of American culture on women of other nations and scrutinizes the masculine aspects of such well-established organizations as the United Nations and the American military. Among other things, she explains that, though she views violence as fundamentally masculine, she does not view only men as perpetrators of violence.

=== "Gender Is Not Enough: The Need for Feminist Consciousness" ===
In "Gender Is Not Enough: The Need for Feminist Consciousness" (2004), Enloe reviews previous conversations with colleagues and fellow feminists, regarding masculinity and international relations. It is mentioned that women are generally disengaged in the UN's wartime peace process of "DDR": disarmament, demobilization and reintegration. Enloe comments on a recent meeting she attended pertaining to 'gender and small arms trade', and how attempts to focus the UN gathering on masculinity had been largely unsuccessful. The matter of international relations and masculinity is addressed, and with that, the concern of masculinity of peacemaking efforts in relation to security. Conversation about the politics of masculinity is quickly dismissed by delegates, suggesting the fear of having their masculinity – and therefore reputation in the world of international relations – examined. As important as it is to address the dynamics of masculinity in politics and specifically in international relations, it is also crucial not to neglect the women and girls. When masculinity is given proper thought, it seems the topic of feminism becomes non-existent. The invisibility of women in military measures and the political disregard for the needs and ideas of women and girls are highlighted and given proper context. Enloe discusses the question of serious feminist analysis in international relations. Two potential fears arise from this question; first, thought of one's own relationship to masculinity is necessary when deciding what is deemed a "serious" issue; and second, the potential to be seen as feminine based on one's judgment of said "serious" issue and therefore the possibility of being valued as less credible. Enloe warns the issues of letting masculinity and men override all aspects of international relations. She speaks of her own difficulties with writing candidly about women and the military and her fears of not being recognized as a legitimate political scientist because of her particular views. The stigma behind feminist thought in international relations needs to be reviewed and resolved. Enloe makes very clear that there is still an immense need for the study of masculinity in international relations and political economy. In order to better develop the international relations discipline, it is imperative that 'gender' be given a broader scope. In order to do so, there must be a feminist consciousness throughout the international relations community, as well as at the local level. A feminist consciousness will instill the education and interest in women and girls through their experiences, actions and ideas. Enloe finishes by reminding that without a proper feminist consciousness; we cannot fully comprehend or accurately analyze masculinity.

=== Nimo's War, Emma's War: Making Feminist Sense of the Iraq War ===
Unlike Enloe's previous books, Nimo's War, Emma's War: Making Feminist Sense of the Iraq War (2010) looks at how war itself is a cataclysm that disrupts countless lives. In this particular book, Enloe solely focuses on capturing the impact of war and revolution on women during the Iraq War. The book looks at eight ordinary women, half Iraqis and half American, and all these women reflect different ideas about feminism through looking into their lives in detail. Importantly, Enloe does not only focus on the female half of this gender-driven phenomenon, but she also looks at their male counterpart in order to further investigate and provide an insight between the consequences of war and the effects on gender roles.

"Maha's Story" talks about an Iraqi woman who, as well as many others, found themselves in a situation where their husband is either dead, divorced, detained, or missing, with children to care for, no social safety nets, meager finances, and no working papers. Maha finds herself caught in between an ethnic cleansing which Enloe terms, "the wielding of violence and intimidation for the sake of driving people of one ethnic or sectarian community out of a region...for the sake of securing that space for members of another ethnic or sectarian community."

"Kim's Story" reveals how gender and war affect each other on the other side of the world in the United States, whether or not one is actual place of war or away from it. Kim is a young American woman married to a National Guard soldier who lives in the San Francisco Bay Area. Her story shows that their nation's state of war is dependent on wives playing certain roles. In the United States, "women who married active-duty, full-time American soldiers had been socialized to perform the demanding role of 'the military wife' ... each woman needed to be persuaded that she was most helpful and loyal to her own husband if she organized her labor and emotions in a way that enhanced the military as a whole." Yet when the men comes home, there are stories that are untold. The American media are reluctant to pursue stories of domestic violence against women whose husbands are involved with the military largely because it is too great of a business risk during wartime. The blame for this neglect and decision to treat male domestic violence as a nonissue is on the entire military's masculinized culture.

== Selected other writings ==
- Twelve Feminist Lessons of War, University of California Press, 2023.
- The Big Push: Exposing and Challenging the Persistence of Patriarchy, Oakland, University of California Press, 2018.
- Enloe, Cynthia (December 2016). "Flick of the skirt: a feminist challenge to IR's coherent narrative". International Political Sociology. 10 (4): 320–331. doi:10.1093/ips/olw017.
- Contributor, International Relations Theory for the Twenty-First Century, Martin Griffiths, ed., USA: Routledge, 2007
- "Conversation with Cynthia Enloe", in Signs. Summer, 2003.
- "The Surprised Feminist", in Signs. Vol. 25, No. 4 (Summer 2000) 1023-1026.
- The Morning After: Sexual Politics at the End of the Cold War, Berkeley and London: University of California Press, 1993 (published in Japanese, 1999); new ed. Berkeley & London, University of California Press, 2000 (published in Turkish, 2003).
- Does Khaki Become You? The Militarization of Women's Lives, London: Pandora Press; San Francisco: Harper\Collins, 1988 (editions have been published in Finnish and Swedish).
- Ethnic Conflict and Political Development, Boston: Little, Brown and Co., 1973 (repr. University Press of America, 1986).
- Coeditor (with Wendy Chapkis) Of Common Cloth: Women in the Global Textile Industry, Amsterdam: Transnational Institute; Washington: Institute for Policy Studies, 1983.
- Contributor, Loaded Questions: Women in Militaries, Wendy Chapkis, ed., Amsterdam: Transnational Institute; Washington: Institute for Policy Studies, 1981.
- Ethnic Soldiers: State Security in Divided Societies, London: Penguin Books, 1980; Athens: University of Georgia Press, 1980.
- Police, Military, Ethnicity: Foundations of State Power, New Brunswick: Transaction Books, 1980.
- Coeditor (with Dewitt Ellinwood), Ethnicity and the Military in Asia, New Brunswick: Transition Books, 1980.
- Coauthor (with Guy Pauker and Frank Golay), Diversity and Development in Southeast Asia: The Coming Decade, New York: McGraw-Hill and Council of Foreign Relations, 1977.
- Coeditor (with Ursula Semin-Panzer), The Military, The Police and Domestic Order: British and Third World Experiences, London: Richardson Institute for Conflict and Peace Research, 1976.
- The Comparative Politics of Pollution, New York: Longman's, 1975.
- Multi-Ethnic Politics: The Case of Malaysia, Berkeley Center for South and Southeast Asian Studies, University of California, Berkeley, 1970.
- Editorial board of the Journal of Women, Politics & Policy.

== Critiques of writings ==
Bananas, Beaches and Bases would be considered Enloe's best-known work. It links various feminist issues regarding international relations throughout prior periods in time and throughout different cultures and places them at the forefront of discussion. In The Journal of Politics Karen Beckwith writes: "Enloe poses an initially simple question which leads to complex if necessarily partial conclusions: What happens to our international understanding of politics if we make the experience of women's lives central to our analysis?" Beckwith later states: "Her analysis is clear, complex, amusing demystifying, accessible, and insightful." In The American Political Science Review Anne Sisson Runyan writes: "Bananas, Beaches, and Bases offers a refreshing, insightful, and critical departure from conventional, top-down treatments of international politics." Runyan later states: "At a time when there is a need to explore the complex interplay of cultural, social, economic, and political forces in the face of the bankruptcy of modernist and masculinist ideologies, orders, and institutions as well as the enormity of global problems, this contemporary feminist reading of world politics makes eminent sense." In The Journal of the History of Sexuality, Manju Parikh writes: "Enloe's analysis is not only a timely contribution but also entertaining reading, which is a welcome addition to supplement the usual dry textbooks in the field." Enloe also incorporates class and ethnicity into the shaping of women's behavior and our understanding of international relations as well. In Contemporary Sociology Kathryn Ward writes: "When seen from the everyday perspective of poor women of color, who are at the heart of our analyses, women's central roles in the world economic and political system become very clear, in contrast with past theories of the world economic and political system that have focused on the activities of white, elite men." Ward later states; "Such analyses may disturb some who are invested in past theories or who are uncomfortable with activism. However, I would argue, as does Enloe, that some of our most insightful and compelling analyses and theories will come from decentering past theories and looking at experiences, ideas, and emerging theories by activist women of color from around the world."

In Does Khaki Become You? The Militarization of Women's Lives, Enloe addresses the impact of militarization on gender relations and the social status of women. In The Journal of Peace Research, Veena Gill writes: "In the context of militarism, [Enloe] analyzes the different roles of women from a social and economic perspective as army wives, nurses, prostitutes, soldiers, workers in defense and allied industries, and from the point of view of feminism. The military institution is exposed as a powerful patriarchal institution which women are urged to resist in their overall efforts towards social justice and equal status."

In Maneuvers; the International Politics of Militarizing Women's Lives, Enloe expands on her themes from Does Khaki Become You. She emphasizes the different experiences of women located in varied ethnic, national, class, and occupational contexts and how they are tailored to the needs of militarism, therefore embedding themselves in policy. In The American Political Science Review, Mary Fainsod Katzenstein writes: "Those already among Enloe's wide readership will know some of this text's central arguments, but Maneuvers offers a trove of new insights. A thesis even more powerfully developed here than in Enloe's earlier writings is the title of the book—how policymakers maneuver to make strategic choices." Katzenstein later states: "Maneuvers has more than a functionalist lesson; by emphasizing policy choices and variability across time and national context, Enloe shows that militaries are not governed by primeval identities."

== Honors and recognition ==
- Fulbright awards to Malaysia and Guyana
- Guest professorships in Japan, Britain and Canada
- "Outstanding Teacher", Clark University (3 times)
- Fellow of the Harvard Radcliffe Institute (2000–2001)
- Honorary Doctorate, School of Oriental and African Studies, University of London (2009).
- The Susan B. Northcutt Award, Women's Caucus for International Studies, International Studies Association, to recognize "a person who actively works toward recruiting and advancing women and other minorities in the profession, and whose spirit is inclusive, generous and conscientious." (2008)
- The Susan Strange Award, International Studies Association, for "a person whose singular intellect, assertiveness, and insight most challenge conventional wisdom and organizational complacency in the international studies community during the previous year." (2007)

== See also ==
- Feminism in international relations
- Betty Reardon
- Elise M. Boulding
