= Gernot Wagner =

Austro-American academic

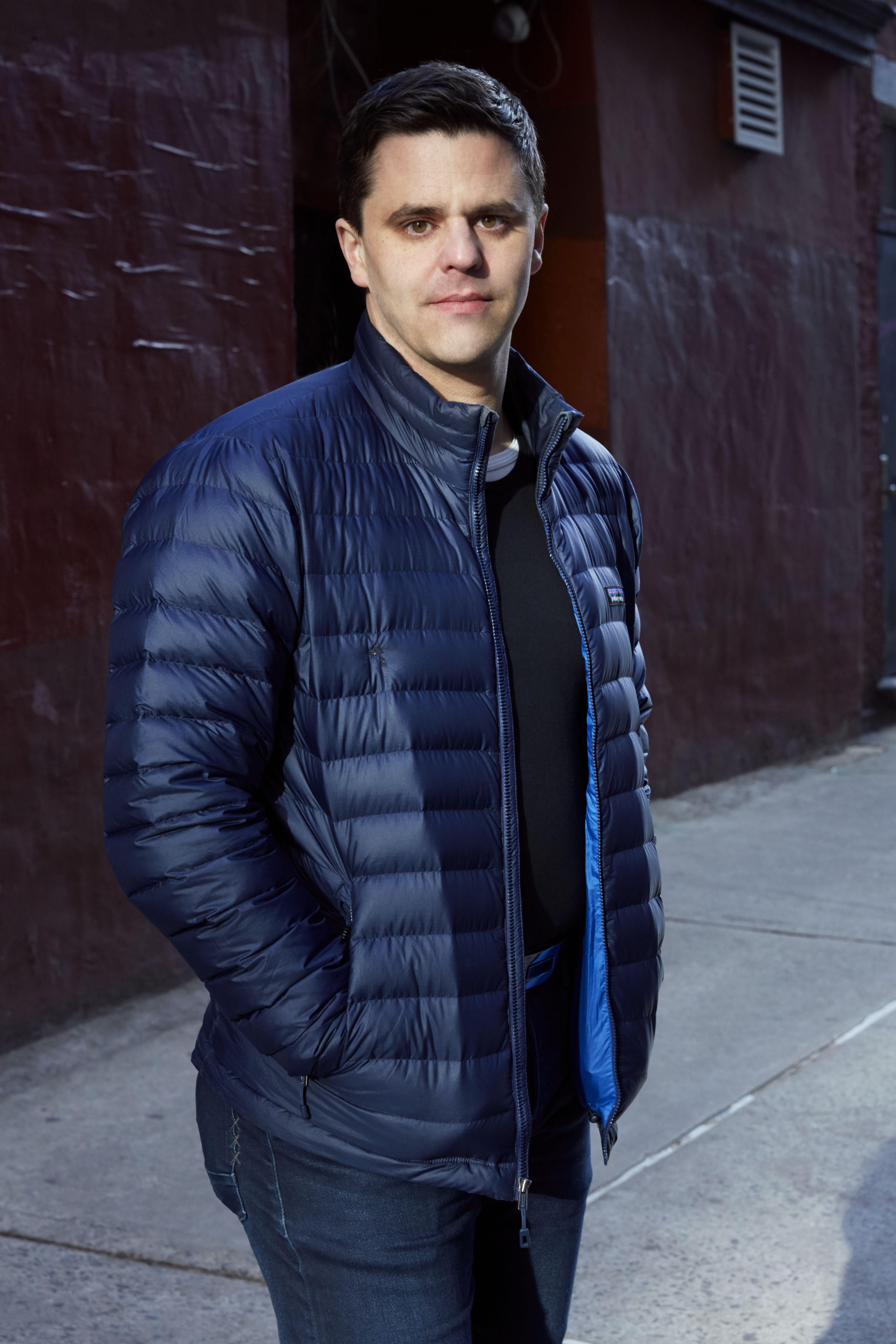
- Gernot Wagner in January 2021
- Born: 1980 (age 45–46); Austria
- Spouse: Dr. Siripanth Nippita (m. 2002)

Academic background
- Education: Harvard University; Stanford University
- Doctoral advisor: Robert N. Stavins
- Influences: Nat Keohane; Martin Weitzman; Richard Zeckhauser

Academic work
- Discipline: climate economics
- School or tradition: environmental economics
- Institutions: Columbia Business School
- Awards: Top 15 Financial Times-McKinsey Business Book of the Year 2015; Austrian of the Year 2022
- Website: Information at IDEAS / RePEc

Gernot Wagner (1980 in Austria) is an Austro-American climate economist at Columbia Business School and faculty director of its Climate Knowledge Initiative. He holds an AB and a PhD in political economy and government from Harvard University, as well as an MA in economics from Stanford University. A founding co-director of Harvard's Solar Geoengineering Research Program (2017–2019) he joined the faculty of New York University in 2019, moving to Columbia University in 2022. Wagner writes a column for Project Syndicate, and is the co-author, with Martin L. Weitzman, of Climate Shock, a Top 15 Financial Times-McKinsey Business Book of the Year 2015. He won the "Austrian of the Year" award in 2022, awarded by Austrian daily Die Presse.

== Energy transition and industrial decarbonization ==
Since joining Columbia Business School, Wagner's work has increasingly focused on the economics of the energy transition, industrial decarbonization, and climate technology deployment. At Columbia Business School, Wagner leads the Climate Knowledge Initiative, which seeks to translate climate research into actionable insights for business leaders, investors, and policymakers.

== Climate and energy policy ==
Wagner was an economist at the Environmental Defense Fund from 2008 to 2014 and lead senior economist from 2014 to 2016. While there he was a member of the faculty of the School of International and Public Affairs, Columbia University, and he wrote Climate Shock (2015), a book emphasizing the importance of risk and uncertainty for prompting action on climate change. Wagner was a member of the six-person lead author team, including Suzi Kerr, that wrote the World Bank's Emissions Trading in Practice: A Handbook on Design and Implementation.

"Risk" and "uncertainty" in climate change are often mentioned as reasons to delay action. Wagner's Climate Shock, joint with Martin Weitzman, emphasizes that the "known unknowns" and potential "unknown unknowns" instead increase the need for action. This contrasts with work done, for example, by economists Bill Nordhaus, Richard Tol, and others. Nordhaus, in turn, favorably reviewed Wagner and Weitzman's book in the New York Review of Books. Wagner's latest academic work on this topic, joint with Kent Daniel of Columbia University and Bob Litterman of Kepos Capital further emphasizes the importance of pricing climate risk and uncertainty.

== Geoengineering ==
Wagner was the founding co-director, joint with David Keith, of Harvard's Solar Geoengineering Research Program founded in 2017 as an interfaculty research initiative. His geoengineering research focuses on economics, governance, policy, and public perception, including the chemtrails conspiracy theory. Together with Dustin Tingley, Wagner finds that in a U.S. public opinion survey conducted in October 2016, 30 to 40% of the U.S. public believed in a version of the conspiracy. The paper also describes what the authors call a "community of conspiracy" in online discourse, in particular on Twitter and other anonymous social media.

On November 23, 2018, Wagner published an open-access article on "Stratospheric aerosol injection tactics and costs in the first 15 years of deployment." The article was noticed by CNN, where the journalist said: "Scientists are proposing an ingenious but as-yet-unproven way to tackle climate change: spraying sun-dimming chemicals into the Earth's atmosphere." The proposal "estimated the development costs of a stratospheric fleet of sulfur-releasing aircraft at $3.5 billion. This theoretical program would start in 2033 with two aircraft and 4,000 annual flights, increasing over 15 years to nearly 100 aircraft flying hundreds of flights a week," and would cost annually to operate "roughly $2.25 billion". The CNN article article was subsequently shared by Questlove and others; Wagner recounted the episode in a conversation with Holly Buck.

Wagner has written a book on the topic: Geoengineering: the Gamble. The book and Wagner's other work on the topic has been heavily criticized by Andreas Malm.

== Books ==
Gernot Wagner has written six books:

- 2003: Der Rest der Welt. Ein Reiseführer für überzeugte Daheimbleiber, Wien, Ueberreuter-Verlag 2003, ISBN 3-8000-3957-5
- 2011: But Will The Planet Notice?. New York, Hill & Wang/Farrar Straus & Giroux, ISBN 0-8090-5207-5
- 2015: Climate Shock, joint with Martin Weitzman, Princeton University Press 2015, ISBN 978-0-691-15947-8 (Financial Times-McKinsey Top 15 Business Book of the Year 2015. Translated into several languages, including German, which has been awarded Austria's Natural Science Book of the Year 2017.)
- 2021: Stadt, Land, Klima: Warum wir nur mit einem urbanen Leben die Erde retten, Brandstätter 2021, ISBN 978-3-7106-0508-6. [German: "City Country Climate"]
- 2021: Geoengineering: The Gamble, Wiley 2021, ISBN 1509543058
- 2024: Climate Race, Leykam; a bilingual English-German collection of a dozen monthly columns for Project Syndicate, ISBN 978-3-7011-0528-1

== Personal life ==
Wagner is a first-generation college student and has been married since 2002 to Dr. Siri Nippita, a gynecologist at NYU Langone Medical Center and the chief of the family planning division as well as the director of Reproductive Choice at Bellevue Hospital. They have two children and live in New York City.

== See also ==
- New Yorkers in journalism
- Environmental economics
- Climateflation
- Fossilflation
