= International relations =

Study of relationships between states

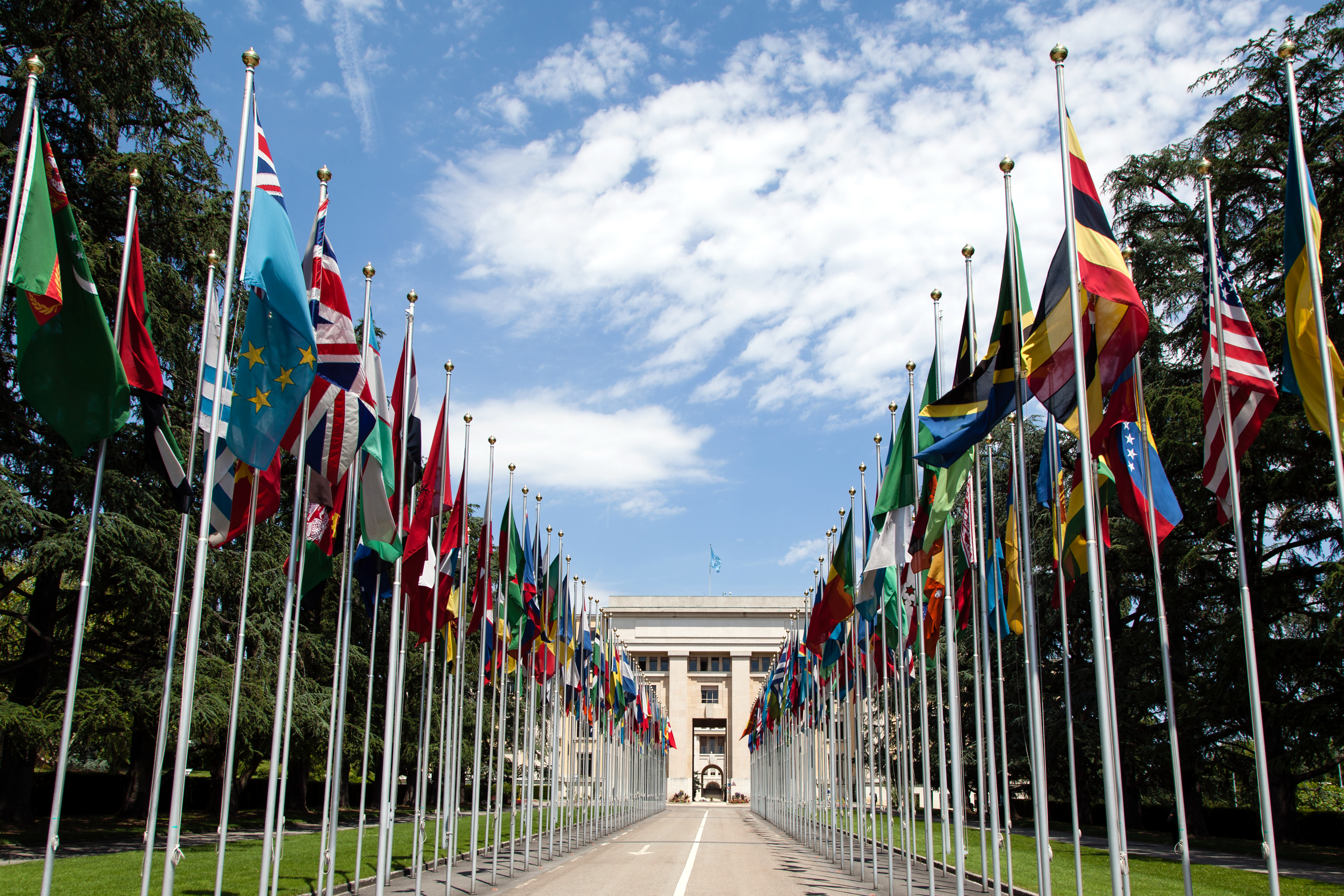
In 2012 alone, the Palace of Nations in Geneva, Switzerland, hosted more than 10,000 intergovernmental meetings. The city hosts the highest number of international organizations in the world.

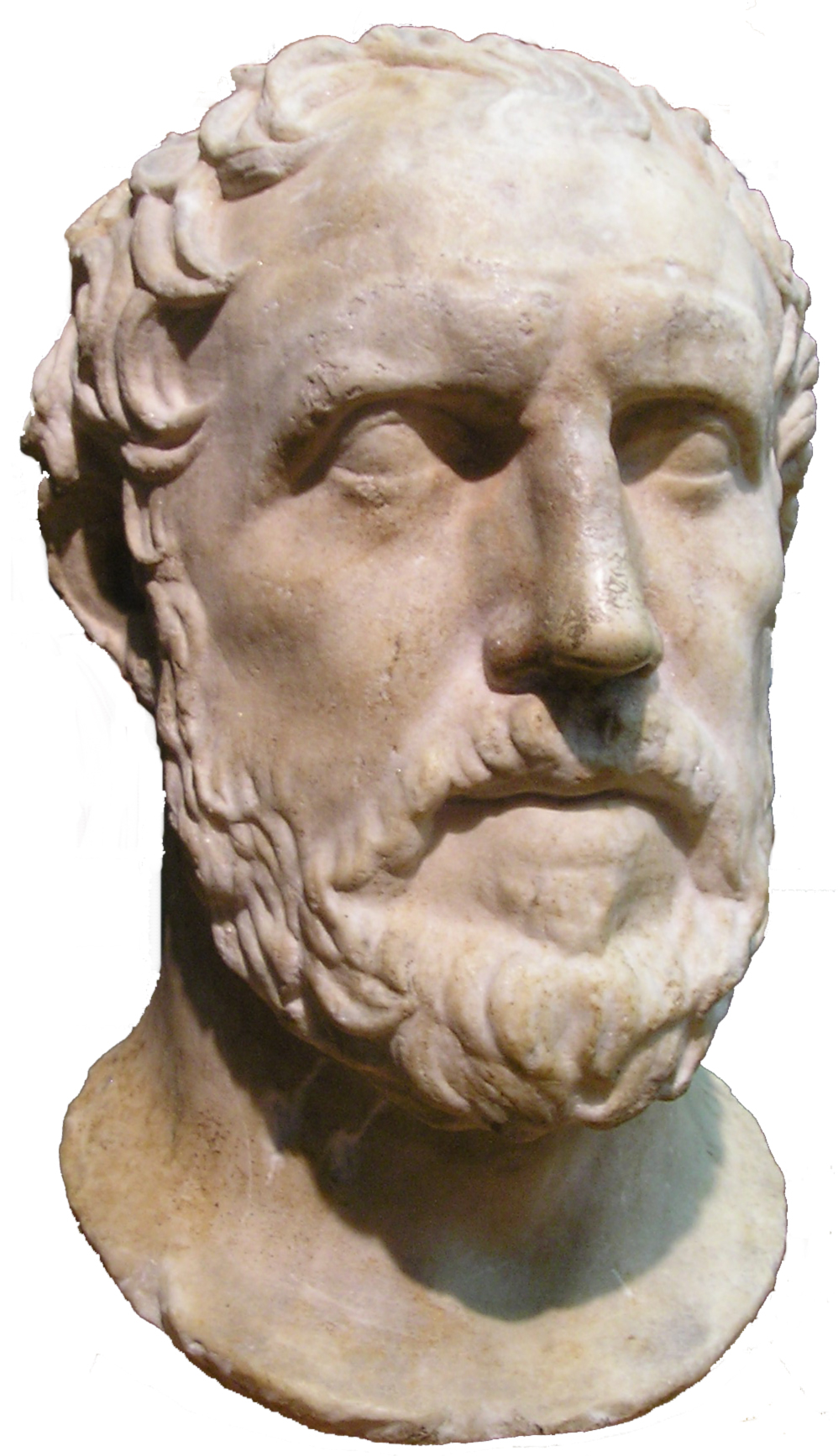
The field of international relations dates from the time of the Greek historian Thucydides.

International relations (IR, and also referred to as international studies, international politics, or international affairs) is an academic discipline. In a broader sense, the study of IR, in addition to multilateral relations, concerns all activities among states—such as war, diplomacy, trade, and foreign policy—as well as relations with and among other international actors, such as intergovernmental organizations (IGOs), international nongovernmental organizations (INGOs), international legal bodies, and multinational corporations (MNCs).

International relations is generally classified as a major multidiscipline of political science, along with comparative politics, political methodology, political theory, and public administration. It often draws heavily from other fields, including anthropology, economics, geography, history, law, philosophy, and sociology. There are several schools of thought within IR, of which the most prominent are realism, liberalism, and constructivism.

While international politics has been analyzed since antiquity, it did not become a discrete field of study until 1919, when it was first offered as an undergraduate major by Aberystwyth University in the United Kingdom. The Second World War and its aftermath provoked greater interest and scholarship in international relations, particularly in North America and Western Europe, where it was shaped considerably by the geostrategic concerns of the Cold War. The collapse of the Soviet Union and the subsequent rise of globalization in the late 20th century have presaged new theories and evaluations of the rapidly changing international system.

In 2024, the United Nations Office at Geneva facilitated 8,505 meetings at the Palais des Nations in Geneva.

== Terminology ==
Depending on the academic institution, international relations or international affairs is either a subdiscipline of political science or a broader multidisciplinary field encompassing global politics, law, economics, or world history. As a subdiscipline of political science, IR studies focus on the political, diplomatic, and security relations among states, as well as on modern international relations within the context of world history. In many academic institutions, studies of IR are thus situated in the department of politics or social sciences.

In institutions where international relations refers to the broader multidisciplinary field of global politics, law, economics and history, the subject may be studied across multiple departments, or be situated in its own department, as is the case at for example the London School of Economics. An undergraduate degree in multidisciplinary international relations may lead to a more specialised master's degree of either international politics, economics, or international law.

In the inaugural issue of World Politics, Frederick S. Dunn wrote that IR was about "relations that take place across national boundaries" and "between autonomous political groups in a world system". Dunn wrote that unique elements characterized IR and separated it from other subfields:

international politics is concerned with the special kind of power relationships that exist in a community lacking an overriding authority; international economics deals with trade relations across national boundaries that are complicated by the uncontrolled actions of sovereign states; and international law is law that is based on voluntary acceptance by independent nations.

The terms "International studies" and "global studies" have been used by some to refer to a broader multidisciplinary IR field.

== History of international relations ==
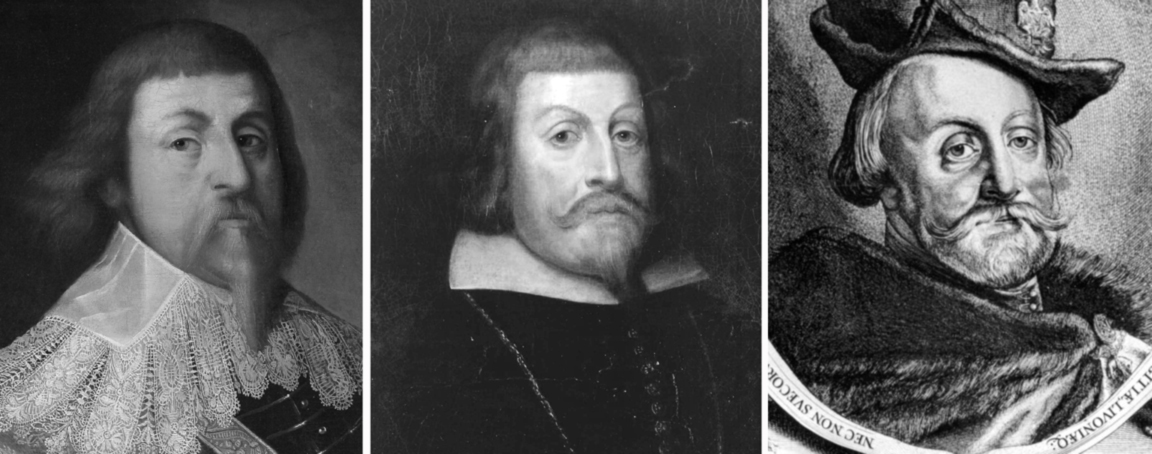
The official portraits of King Władysław IV dressed according to French, Spanish, and Polish fashion reflects the complex politics of the Polish–Lithuanian Commonwealth during the Thirty Years' War.

Studies of international relations began thousands of years ago; Barry Buzan and Richard Little considered the interactions of ancient Sumerian city-states, dating back to 3,500 BC, as the first fully-fledged international system. Analyses of the foreign

policies of sovereign city states have been done in ancient times, as in Thucydides' analysis of the causes of the Peloponnesian War between Athens and Sparta, as well as by Niccolò Machiavelli in The Prince, published in 1532, where he analyzed the foreign policy of the renaissance city state of Florence. The contemporary field of international relations, however, analyzes the connections existing between sovereign nation-states. This makes the establishment of the modern state system the natural starting point of international relations history.

The establishment of modern sovereign states as fundamental political units traces back to the Peace of Westphalia of 1648 in Europe. During the preceding Middle Ages, the European organization of political authority was based on a vaguely hierarchical religious order. Contrary to popular belief, Westphalia still embodied layered systems of sovereignty, especially within the Holy Roman Empire. More than the Peace of Westphalia, the Treaty of Utrecht of 1713 is thought to reflect an emerging norm that sovereigns had no internal equals within a defined territory and no external superiors as the ultimate authority within the territory's sovereign borders. These principles underpin the modern international legal and political order.

The period between roughly 1500 and 1789 saw the rise of independent sovereign states, multilateralism, and the institutionalization of diplomacy and the military. The French Revolution introduced the idea that the citizenry of a state, defined as the nation, was sovereign rather than a monarch or the nobility. A state in which the nation is sovereign would hence be termed a nation-state, as opposed to a monarchy or a religious state; the term republic increasingly became its synonym. An alternative model of the nation-state was developed in reaction to the French republican concept by the Germans and others, who, instead of giving the citizenry sovereignty, kept the princes and nobility, but defined nation-statehood in ethnic-linguistic terms, establishing the rarely, if ever, fulfilled ideal that all people speaking one language should belong to one state only. The same claim to sovereignty was made for both forms of nation-state. In Europe today, few states conform to either definition of nation-state: many continue to have royal sovereigns, and hardly any are ethnically homogeneous.

The particular European system supposing the sovereign equality of states was exported to the Americas, Africa, and Asia via colonialism and the "standards of civilization". The contemporary international system was finally established through decolonization during the Cold War. However, this is somewhat over-simplified. While the nation-state system is considered "modern", many states have not adopted it and are termed "pre-modern". A handful of states have moved beyond insistence on full sovereignty and can be considered "post-modern". The ability of contemporary IR discourse to explain the relations of these different types of states is disputed. "Levels of analysis" are a way of looking at the international system, which includes the individual level, the domestic state as a unit of analysis, the international level of transnational and intergovernmental affairs, and the global level.

What is explicitly recognized as international relations theory was not developed until after World War I, and is dealt with in more detail below. IR theory, however, has a long tradition of drawing on the work of other social sciences. The capitalization of "I" and "R" in international relations aims to distinguish the academic discipline from the phenomena it studies. Many cite Sun Tzu's The Art of War (6th century BC), Thucydides' History of the Peloponnesian War (5th century BC), Chanakya's Arthashastra (4th century BC), as the inspiration for realist theory, with Hobbes' Leviathan and Machiavelli's The Prince providing further elaboration.

Similarly, liberalism draws upon the work of Immanuel Kant and Rousseau, with the former's work often cited as the first elaboration of democratic peace theory. Though contemporary human rights is considerably different from the type of rights envisioned under natural law, Francisco de Vitoria, Hugo Grotius, and John Locke offered the first accounts of universal entitlement to certain rights based on common humanity. In the 20th century, in addition to contemporary theories of liberal internationalism, Marxism has been a foundation of international relations.

=== Emergence as academic discipline ===
International relations, as a distinct field of study, began in the United Kingdom. IR emerged as a formal academic discipline in 1919 with the founding of the first IR professorship: the Woodrow Wilson Chair at Aberystwyth, University of Wales (now Aberystwyth University), held by Alfred Eckhard Zimmern and endowed by David Davies. International politics courses were established at the University of Wisconsin in 1899 by Paul Samuel Reinsch and at Columbia University in 1910. By 1920, there were four universities that taught courses on international organization.

Georgetown University's Walsh School of Foreign Service is the oldest continuously operating school for international affairs in the United States, founded in 1919. In 1927, the London School of Economics' department of international relations was founded at the behest of Nobel Peace Prize winner Philip Noel-Baker: this was the first institute to offer a wide range of degrees in the field. That same year, the Graduate Institute of International and Development Studies, a school dedicated to teaching international affairs, was founded in Geneva, Switzerland. This was rapidly followed by the establishment of IR at universities in the US. The creation of the posts of Montague Burton Professor of International Relations at LSE and at Oxford gave further impetus to the academic study of international relations. Furthermore, the International History department at LSE developed a focus on the history of IR in the early modern, colonial, and Cold War periods.

The first university entirely dedicated to the study of IR was the Graduate Institute of International and Development Studies, founded in 1927 to train diplomats for the League of Nations. In 1922, Georgetown University graduated its first class of the Master of Science in Foreign Service (MSFS) degree, making it the first international relations graduate program in the United States. This was soon followed by the establishment of the Committee on International Relations (CIR) at the University of Chicago, where the first research graduate degree was conferred in 1928. The Fletcher School of Law and Diplomacy, a collaboration between Tufts University and Harvard University, opened its doors in 1933 as the first graduate-only school of international affairs in the United States. In 1965, Glendon College and the Norman Paterson School of International Affairs were the first institutions in Canada to offer an undergraduate and a graduate program in international studies and affairs, respectively.

The lines between IR and other political science subfields are sometimes blurred, in particular when it comes to the study of conflict, institutions, political economy, and political behavior. The division between comparative politics and international relations is artificial, as processes within nations shape international processes, and international processes shape processes within states. Some scholars have called for an integration of the fields. Comparative politics does not have similar "isms" as international relations scholarship.

== Theory ==
Within the study of international relations, multiple theories seek to explain how states and other actors operate in the international system. These can generally be divided into three main strands: realism, liberalism, and constructivism.

=== Realism ===
The realist framework of international relations rests on the fundamental assumption that the international state system is an anarchy, with no overarching power to restrict the behaviour of sovereign states. As a consequence, states are engaged in a continuous power struggle, where they seek to augment their own military capabilities, economic power, and diplomacy relative to other states; this is to ensure the protection of their political system, citizens, and vital interests. The realist framework further assumes that states act as unitary, rational actors, where central decision makers in the state apparatus ultimately stand for most of the state's foreign policy decisions. International organizations are in consequence merely seen as tools for individual states used to further their own interests, and are thought to have little power in shaping states' foreign policies on their own.

The realist framework is traditionally associated with the analysis of power politics, and has been used to analyze the conflicts between states in the early European state system; the causes of the First and Second World Wars, as well as the behavior of the United States and the Soviet Union during the Cold War. In settings such as these, the realist framework offers valuable interpretative insights into how states' military and economic power struggles lead to larger armed conflicts.

History of the Peloponnesian War, written by Thucydides, is considered a foundational text of the realist school of political philosophy. There is debate over whether Thucydides himself was a realist; Richard Ned Lebow has argued that seeing Thucydides as a realist is a misinterpretation of a more complex political message within his work. Amongst others, philosophers like Machiavelli, Hobbes, and Rousseau are considered to have contributed to the realist philosophy. However, while their work may support realist doctrine, it is not likely that they would have classified themselves as realists in this sense. Political realism holds that politics, like society, is governed by objective laws rooted in human nature. To improve society, it is first necessary to understand the laws by which society lives. Because the operation of these laws is impervious to our preferences, persons will challenge them only at the risk of failure. Realism, believing as it does in the objectivity of the laws of politics, must also believe in the possibility of developing a rational theory that reflects, however imperfectly and one-sidedly, these objective laws. It also believes, then, in the possibility of distinguishing in politics between truth and opinion—between what is true objectively and rationally, supported by evidence and illuminated by reason, and what is only a subjective judgment, divorced from the facts as they are and informed by prejudice and wishful thinking. Major theorists include E. H. Carr, Robert Gilpin, Charles P. Kindleberger, Stephen D. Krasner, Hans Morgenthau, Kenneth Waltz, Robert Jervis, Stephen Walt, and John Mearsheimer.

=== Liberalism ===
In contrast to realism, the liberal framework emphasises that, although states are sovereign, they do not exist in a purely anarchic system. Rather, liberal theory assumes that states are institutionally constrained by the power of international organisations and mutually dependent on one another through economic and diplomatic ties. Institutions such as the United Nations, the World Trade Organisation (WTO), and the International Court of Justice are taken to have, over time, developed power and influence to shape the foreign policies of individual states. Furthermore, the existence of the globalised world economy makes a continuous military power struggle irrational, as states depend on participation in the global trade system to ensure their own survival. As such, the liberal framework emphasizes cooperation among states as a fundamental component of the international system. States are not seen as unitary actors but as pluralistic arenas in which interest groups, non-governmental organisations, and economic actors also shape foreign policy.

The liberal framework is associated with the analysis of the globalised world as it emerged in the aftermath of World War II. Increased political cooperation through organisations such as the UN, as well as economic cooperation through institutions such as the WTO, the World Bank and the International Monetary Fund, was thought to have made the realist analysis of power and conflict inadequate in explaining the workings of the international system.

Kant's essay Perpetual Peace from 1795 is often cited as the intellectual basis of liberal theory. In it, he postulates that, over time, states, through increased political and economic cooperation, will come to resemble an international federation—a world government—characterised by continual peace and cooperation. In modern times, liberal international relations theory arose after World War I in response to the ability of states to control and limit war in their international relations. Early adherents include Woodrow Wilson and Norman Angell, who argued that states mutually gained from cooperation and that war was so destructive as to be essentially futile. Liberalism was not recognized as a coherent theory as such until it was collectively and derisively termed idealism by E. H. Carr. A new version of "idealism" that focused on human rights as the basis of the legitimacy of international law was advanced by Hans Köchler. Major theorists include Montesquieu, Kant, Michael W. Doyle, Francis Fukuyama, and Helen Milner.

==== Liberal institutionalism ====
Liberal institutionalism (sometimes referred to as neoliberalism) shows how cooperation can be achieved in international relations even if neorealist assumptions apply (states are the key actors in world politics, the international system is anarchic, and states pursue their self-interest). Liberal institutionalists highlight the role of international institutions and regimes in facilitating cooperation between states.

Prominent neoliberal institutionalists are John Ikenberry, Robert Keohane, and Joseph Nye. Robert Keohane's 1984 book After Hegemony used insights from the new institutional economics to argue that the international system could remain stable in the absence of a hegemon, thus rebutting hegemonic stability theory.

===== Regime theory =====
Regime theory is derived from the liberal tradition, which argues that international institutions, or regimes, affect the behaviour of states (and other international actors). It assumes that cooperation is possible within the anarchic system of states; indeed, regimes are, by definition, instances of international cooperation.

While realism predicts that conflict should be the norm in international relations, regime theorists argue that cooperation persists despite anarchy. Often, they cite cooperation in trade, human rights, and collective security among other issues. These instances of cooperation are regimes. The most commonly cited definition of regimes comes from Stephen Krasner, who defines regimes as "principles, norms, rules, and decision-making procedures around which actor expectations converge in a given issue-area". Not all approaches to regime theory, however, are liberal or neoliberal; some realist scholars like Joseph Grieco have developed hybrid theories which take a realist-based approach to this fundamentally liberal theory. (Realists do not say cooperation never happens, just that it is not the norm; it is a difference of degree).

=== Constructivism ===
The constructivist framework rests on the fundamental assumption that the international system is built on social constructs, such as ideas, norms, and identities. Various political actors, such as state leaders, policy makers, and leaders of international organisations, are socialised into different roles and systems of norms that define how the international system operates. The constructivist scholar Alexander Wendt, in a 1992 article in International Organization, noted, in response to realism, that "anarchy is what states make of it". By this, he means that the anarchic structure realists claim governs state interaction is, in fact, socially constructed and reproduced by states.

Constructivism is part of critical theory and, as such, seeks to criticise the assumptions underlying traditional IR theory. Constructivist theory would, for example, claim that the state leaders of the United States and the Soviet Union were socialised into different roles and norms, which can provide theoretical insights into how the conflict between the nations was conducted during the Cold War. E.g., prominent US policymakers frequently spoke of the USSR as an 'evil empire' and thus socialised the US population and state apparatus into an anti-communist sentiment that defined the norms of US foreign policy. Other constructivist analyses include discourses on European integration; senior policy-making circles were socialised into the idea of Europe as a historical and cultural community and therefore sought to construct institutions to integrate European nations into a single political body. Constructivism is also present in the analysis of international law, where norms of conduct such as the prohibition of chemical weapons, torture, and the protection of civilians in war, are socialised into international organisations, and stipulated into rules. Prominent constructivist IR scholars include Michael Barnett, Martha Finnemore, Ted Hopf, Peter Katzenstein, Kathryn Sikkink, and Alexander Wendt.

=== Critical theory (post-structuralism) ===
Post-structuralist theories of international relations (also called critical theories because they are inherently critical of traditional IR frameworks) developed in the 1980s from postmodernist studies in political science. Post-structuralism explores the deconstruction of concepts traditionally not problematic in IR (such as "power" and "agency") and examines how the construction of these concepts shapes international relations. The examination of "narratives" plays an important part in poststructuralist analysis; for example, feminist poststructuralist work has examined the role that "women" play in global society and how they are constructed in war as "innocent" and "civilians". Rosenberg's article "Why is there no International Historical Sociology" was a key text in the evolution of this strand of international relations theory. Post-structuralism has garnered both significant praise and criticism, with critics arguing that post-structuralist research often fails to address the real-world problems that international relations studies are supposed to help solve. Constructivist theory (see above) is the most prominent strand of post-structuralism. Other prominent post-structuralist theories include Marxism, dependency theory, feminism, and the English School. See also critical international relations theory.

==== Marxism ====
Marxist theories of IR reject the realist/liberal view of state conflict or cooperation; instead, they focus on the economic and material aspects. It assumes that the economy trumps other concerns, making economic class the fundamental level of analysis. Marxists view the international system as an integrated capitalist system pursuing capital accumulation. Thus, colonialism brought access to raw materials and captive markets for exports, while decolonialization brought new opportunities in the form of dependence.

A prominent derivative of Marxian thought is critical international relations theory, which applies "critical theory" to international relations. Early critical theorists were associated with the Frankfurt School, which followed Marx's concern with the conditions that allow for social change and the establishment of rational institutions. Their emphasis on the "critical" component of theory stemmed largely from their attempt to overcome the limits of positivism. Modern-day proponents such as Andrew Linklater, Robert W. Cox, and Ken Booth focus on the human need emancipation from the nation-state. Hence, it is "critical" of mainstream IR theories that are both positivist and state-centric.

===== Dependency theory =====
Further linked in with Marxist theories is dependency theory and the core–periphery model, which argue that developed countries, in their pursuit of power, appropriate developing states through international banking, security and trade agreements and unions on a formal level, and do so through the interaction of political and financial advisors, missionaries, relief aid workers, and MNCs on the informal level, to integrate them into the capitalist system, strategically appropriating undervalued natural resources and labor hours and fostering economic and political dependence.

==== Feminism ====
Feminist IR considers the ways that international politics affects and is affected by both men and women, and also how the core concepts that are employed within the discipline of IR (e.g., war, security, etc.) are themselves gendered. Feminist IR has not only addressed the traditional focus of IR on states, wars, diplomacy, and security, but has also emphasized the importance of examining how gender shapes the current global political economy. In this sense, there is no clear-cut division between feminists working in IR and those working in International Political Economy (IPE). From its inception, feminist IR has also theorized extensively about men and, in particular, masculinities. Many IR feminists argue that the discipline is inherently masculine in nature. For example, in her article "Sex and Death in the Rational World of Defense Intellectuals" (1988), Carol Cohn claimed that a highly masculinized culture within the defense establishment contributed to the divorcing of war from human emotion. Alternatively, Stanley Kubrick claimed that a masculinized culture characterizes only great powers while small states express a rather feminized culture within their defense establishment: "The great nations have always acted like gangsters, and the small nations like prostitutes."

Feminist IR emerged largely from the late 1980s onward. The end of the Cold War and the re-evaluation of traditional IR theory in the 1990s created space for the gendering of International Relations. Because feminist IR is broadly linked to the critical project in IR, most feminist scholarship has sought to problematize the politics of knowledge construction within the discipline, often by adopting deconstructivist methodologies associated with postmodernism and poststructuralism. However, the growing influence of feminist and women-centric approaches within the international policy communities (for example, at the World Bank and the United Nations) is more reflective of the liberal feminist emphasis on equality of opportunity for women. Prominent scholars include Carol Cohn, Cynthia Enloe, Sara Ruddick, and J. Ann Tickner.

==== International society theory (the English school) ====
International society theory, also known as the English school, focuses on the shared norms and values among states and how they regulate international relations. Examples of such norms include diplomacy, order, and international law. Theorists have focused particularly on humanitarian intervention, and are subdivided between solidarists, who tend to advocate it more, and pluralists, who place greater value on order and sovereignty. Nicholas Wheeler is a prominent solidarist, while Hedley Bull and Robert H. Jackson are perhaps the best known pluralists. Some English school theorists have used historical cases to show how normative frameworks have influenced the evolution of the international political order at various critical junctures.

== Levels of analysis ==
=== Systemic level concepts ===
International relations are often viewed in terms of levels of analysis. The systemic level concepts are those broad concepts that define and shape an international milieu, characterized by anarchy. Focusing on the systemic level of international relations is often, but not always, the preferred method for neo-realists and other structuralist IR analysts.

==== Sovereignty ====
Preceding the concepts of interdependence and dependence, international relations rely on the idea of sovereignty. Described in Jean Bodin's Six Books of the Commonwealth in 1576, the three pivotal points derived from the book describe sovereignty as being a state, that the sovereign power(s) have absolute power over their territories, and that such a power is only limited by the sovereign's "own obligations towards other sovereigns and individuals". Such a foundation of sovereignty is indicated by a sovereign's obligation to other sovereigns, interdependence, and dependence to take place. Throughout world history, there have been instances of groups lacking or losing sovereignty, such as African nations before decolonization and Iraq under occupation during the Iraq War, yet sovereignty remains relevant to assessing international relations.

==== Power ====
The concept of power in international relations can be described as the degree of resources, capabilities, and influence in international affairs. It is often divided up into the concepts of hard power and soft power, hard power relating primarily to coercive power, such as the use of force, and soft power commonly covering economics, diplomacy, and cultural influence. However, there is no clear dividing line between the two forms of power.

==== National interest ====
Perhaps the most significant concept behind power and sovereignty, national interest, concerns a state's actions in relation to other states, in which it seeks to gain advantage or benefits for itself. National interest, whether aspirational or operational, is divided by core/vital and peripheral/non-vital interests. Core or vital interests are the things a country is willing to defend or expand through conflict, such as territory, ideology (religious, political, economic), or its citizens. Peripheral or non-vital interests are interests that a state is willing to compromise. For example, in Germany's annexation of the Sudetenland in 1938 (part of Czechoslovakia) under the Munich Agreement, Czechoslovakia was willing to relinquish territory considered ethnically German to preserve its own integrity and sovereignty.

==== Non-state actors ====
In the 21st century, the status quo of the international system is no longer monopolized by states alone. Rather, it is the presence of non-state actors who act autonomously and produce unpredictable behaviour in the international system. Whether it is transnational corporations, liberation movements, non-governmental agencies, or international organizations, these entities can significantly influence the outcome of any international transaction. Additionally, this includes the person, as while the individual constitutes the state's collective entity, the individual can also create unpredictable behaviours. Al-Qaeda, as an example of a non-state actor, has significantly influenced the way states (and non-state actors) conduct international affairs.

==== Power blocs ====
The existence of power blocs in international relations is a significant factor related to polarity. During the Cold War, the alignment of several nations on one side or the other, based on ideological differences or national interests, became an endemic feature of international relations. Unlike prior, shorter-term blocs, the Western and Eastern Blocs sought to spread their national ideological differences to other nations. Leaders like US President Harry S. Truman, under the Truman Doctrine, believed it was necessary to spread democracy, whereas the Warsaw Pact, under Soviet policy, sought to spread communism. After the Cold War, and the dissolution of the ideologically homogeneous Eastern Bloc still gave rise to others such as the South-South Cooperation movement.

==== Polarity ====
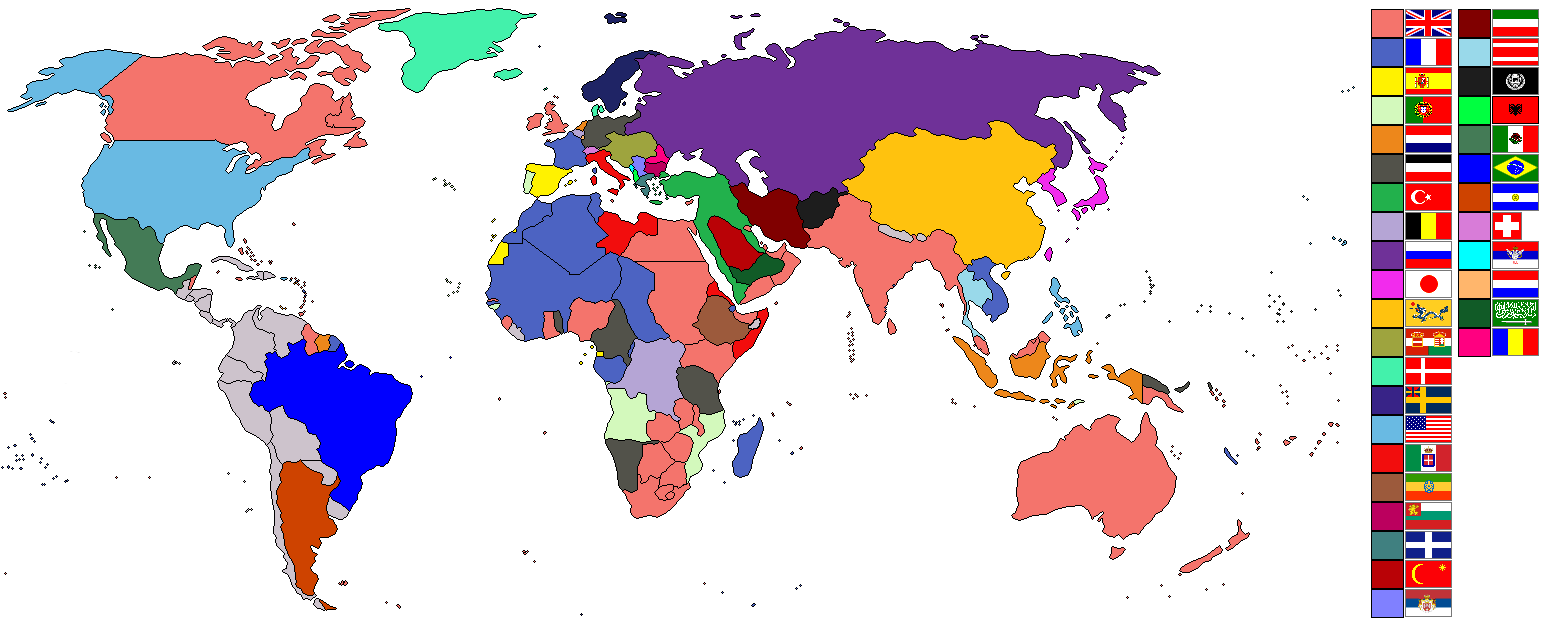
Empires of the world in 1910

Polarity in international relations refers to the arrangement of power within the international system. The concept arose from bipolarity during the Cold War, when the international system was dominated by conflict between two superpowers, and has been applied retrospectively by theorists. However, the term bipolar was notably used by Stalin, who said he saw the international system as a bipolar one with two opposing power bases and ideologies. Consequently, the international system before 1945 can be described as multipolar, with power shared among great powers.

The collapse of the Soviet Union in 1991 led to unipolarity, with the United States as the sole superpower, although many refuse to acknowledge it. China's continued rapid economic growth—it became the world's second-largest economy in 2010—respectable international position, and the power the Chinese government exerts over its people (consisting of the second largest population in the world), resulted in debate over whether China is now a superpower or a possible candidate in the future. However, China's strategic force unable of projecting power beyond its region and its nuclear arsenal of 250 warheads (compared to 7,315+ of the United States) mean that the unipolarity will persist in the policy-relevant future. Several theories of international relations draw upon the idea of polarity. The balance of power was a concept prevalent in Europe before the First World War, the idea being that balancing power blocs would create stability and prevent war. Theories of the balance of power gained prominence again during the Cold War, being a central mechanism of Kenneth Waltz's neorealism. Here, the concepts of balancing (rising in power to counter another) and bandwagoning (siding with another) are developed.

Robert Gilpin's hegemonic stability theory also draws on the idea of polarity, specifically unipolarity. Hegemony is the preponderance of power at one pole in the international system, and the theory argues that this is a stable configuration because of mutual gains by both the dominant power and others in the international system. This is contrary to many neorealist arguments, particularly those of Waltz, which hold that the end of the Cold War and the unipolar state constitute an unstable configuration that will inevitably change. The case of Gilpin proved to be correct; Waltz's article titled "The Stability of a Bipolar World" was followed in 1999 by William Wohlforth's article titled "The Stability of a Unipolar World". Waltz's thesis can be expressed in power transition theory, which states that a great power would likely challenge a hegemon after a certain period, resulting in a major war. It suggests that while hegemony can prevent wars when a dominant power restrains lesser powers, it can also lead to wars when an emergent power challenges the dominant power. Its main proponent, A. F. K. Organski, argued this based on the occurrence of previous wars during British, Portuguese, and Dutch hegemony. This dynamic has been used to explain, for example, tensions between the United States and China during the early decades of the Twenty-First Century.

==== Interdependence ====
Many advocate that the current international system is characterized by growing interdependence, mutual responsibility, and dependency on others. Advocates of this point cite growing globalization, particularly with international economic interaction. The role of international institutions and the widespread acceptance of many operating principles in the international system reinforce the idea that relations are characterized by interdependence.

==== Dependency ====
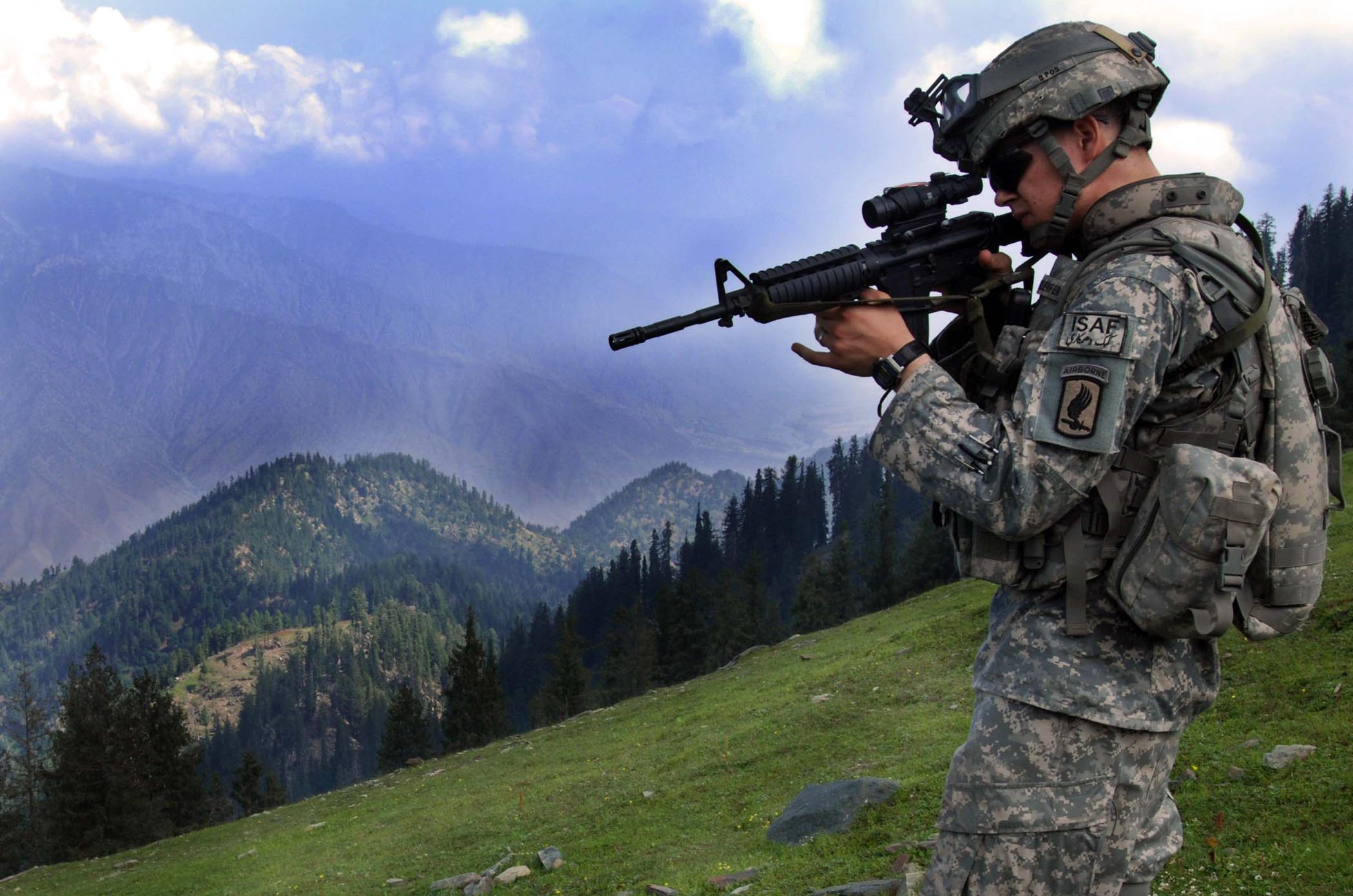
NATO International Security Assistance Force in Afghanistan

Dependency theory is a theory most commonly associated with Marxism, which holds that a set of core states exploits a set of weaker periphery states to advance their prosperity. Various versions of the theory either present this as inevitable (standard dependency theory) or highlight the necessity for change (Neo-Marxist).

==== Systemic tools of international relations ====
- Diplomacy is the practice of communication and negotiation between representatives of states. To some extent, all other tools of international relations can be considered the failure of diplomacy. Keeping in mind that the use of other tools is part of the communication and negotiation inherent in diplomacy. Sanctions, force, and adjustments to trade regulations, while not typically considered part of diplomacy, are valuable tools for leverage and positioning in negotiations.
- Sanctions are usually a first resort after the failure of diplomacy, and are one of the main tools used to enforce treaties. They can take the form of diplomatic or economic sanctions and involve cutting ties and imposing barriers to communication or trade.
- War, the use of force, is often thought of as the ultimate tool of international relations. A popular definition is that of Carl von Clausewitz, who described war as "the continuation of politics by other means". There is growing research on "new wars" involving non-state actors. The study of war in international relations is covered by the disciplines of "war studies" and "strategic studies".
- The mobilization of international shame can also be thought of as a tool of international relations. This is attempting to alter states' actions through 'naming and shaming' at the international level. This is mostly done by the large human rights NGOs such as Amnesty International (for instance, when it called Guantanamo Bay a "Gulag"), or Human Rights Watch. A prominent use of this was the UN Commission on Human Rights 1235 procedure, which publicly exposes a state's human rights violations. The current UN Human Rights Council has yet to use this mechanism.
- The allotment of economic and/or diplomatic benefits, such as the European Union's enlargement policy; candidate countries are only allowed to join if they meet the Copenhagen criteria.
- The mutual exchange of ideas, information, art, music, and language among nations through cultural diplomacy has also been recognized by governments as an important tool in the development of international relations.

=== Unit-level concepts in international relations ===
As a level of analysis, the unit level is often referred to as the state level, as it locates explanations at the state level rather than at the level of the international system.

==== Regime type ====
It is often argued that a state's form of government can dictate how it interacts with other states in international relations. Democratic peace theory is a theory that suggests that the nature of democracy means democratic countries will not go to war with one another. The justifications for this are that democracies externalize their norms and only go to war for causes, and that democracy encourages mutual trust and respect. Marxism justifies a world revolution, which would similarly lead to peaceful coexistence based on a proletarian global society.

==== Revisionism versus status quo ====
States can be classified by whether they accept the international status quo, or are revisionist—i.e., want change. Revisionist states seek to fundamentally change the rules and practices of international relations, feeling disadvantaged by the status quo. They see the international system as a largely Western creation that reinforces current realities. Japan is an example of a state that has gone from being a revisionist state to one that is satisfied with the status quo, because the status quo is now beneficial to it.

==== Religion ====
Religion can affect the way a state acts within the international system, and different theoretical perspectives treat it in somewhat different fashion. One dramatic example is the Thirty Years' War (1618–1648), which ravaged much of Europe and was at least partly motivated by theological differences within Christianity. Religion is a major organizing principle, particularly for Islamic states. In contrast, secularism sits at the other end of the spectrum, with the separation of state and religion underpinning liberal international relations theory. The September 11 attacks in the United States, the role of Islam in terrorism, and religious strife in the Middle East have made the role of religion in international relations a major topic. China's reemergence as a major international power is believed by some scholars to be shaped by Confucianism.

=== Individual or sub-unit level concepts ===
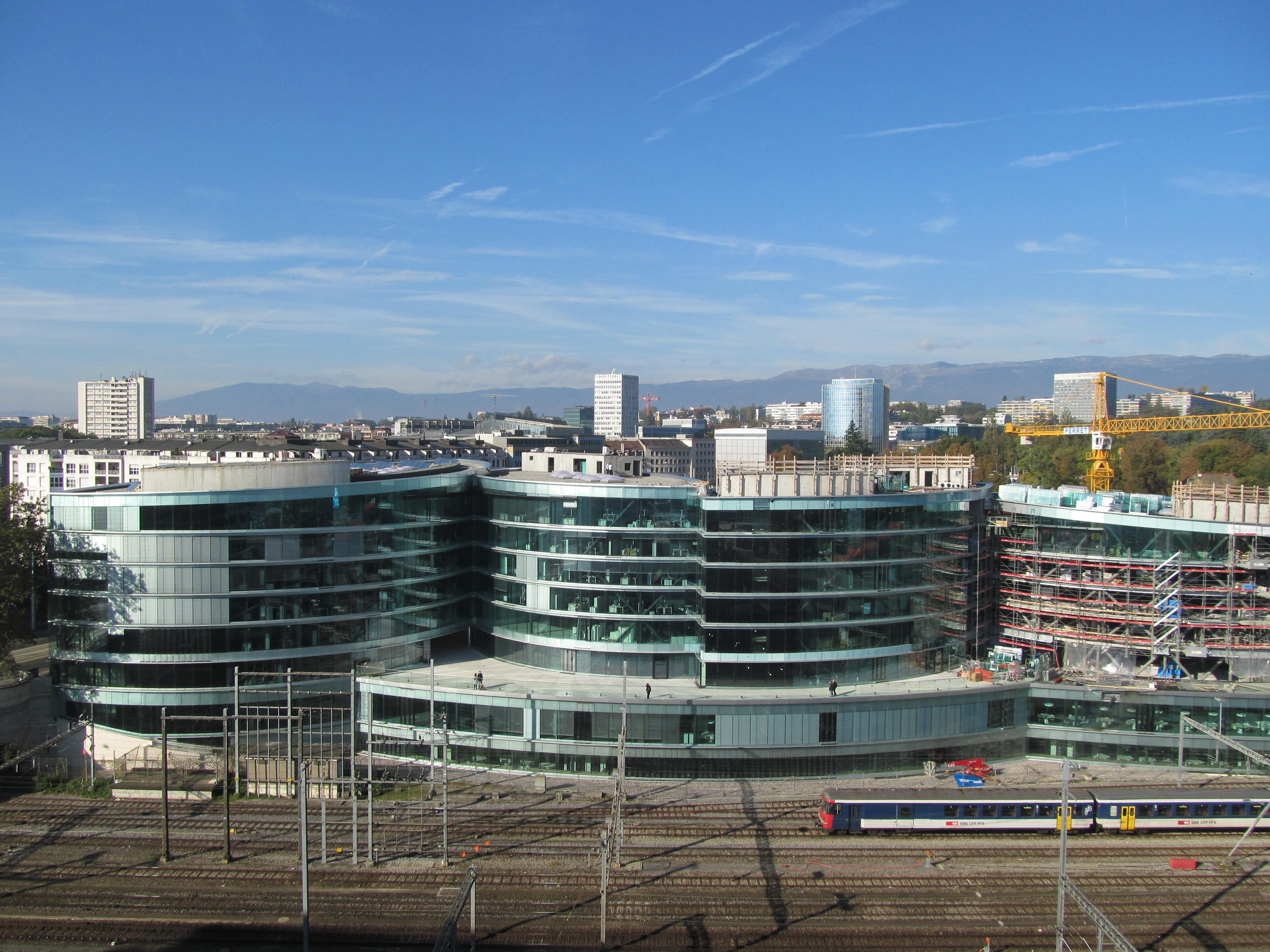
Maison de la Paix, home to the Graduate Institute Geneva

The level below the unit (state) can be useful both for explaining factors in international relations that other theories fail to account for and for moving away from a state-centric view.

- Psychological factors in international relations – Understanding a state is not a "black box" as proposed by realism, and that there may be other influences on foreign policy decisions. Examining the role of personalities in the decision-making process can have some explanatory power, as can the role of misperception between various actors. A prominent application of sub-unit-level psychological factors in international relations is the concept of Groupthink; another is policymakers' propensity to rely on analogies.
- Bureaucratic politics – Looks at the role of the bureaucracy in decision-making, and sees decisions as a result of bureaucratic infighting, and as having been shaped by various constraints.
- Religious, ethnic, and secessionist groups – Viewing these aspects of the sub-unit level has explanatory power with regards to ethnic conflicts, religious wars, transnational diaspora (diaspora politics) and other actors which do not consider themselves to fit with the defined state boundaries. This is particularly useful in the context of the pre-modern world of weak states.
- Science, technology, and international relations – How science and technology impact global health, business, environment, technology, and development.
- International political economy, and economic factors in international relations
- International political culturology – Looks at how culture and cultural variables impact international relations
- Personal relations between leaders

== Area studies ==
Area studies are the subfields of international studies that examine specific geopolitical regions in detail. Many university departments are offering area studies in diverse titles.

=== Major fields of area studies ===
- Middle Eastern studies
- Central Asian studies
- African studies
- South Asian studies
- American studies
- European studies
- Southeast Asian studies
- Australian studies
- Armenian studies
- Russian studies
- Latin American studies

== Institutions in international relations ==
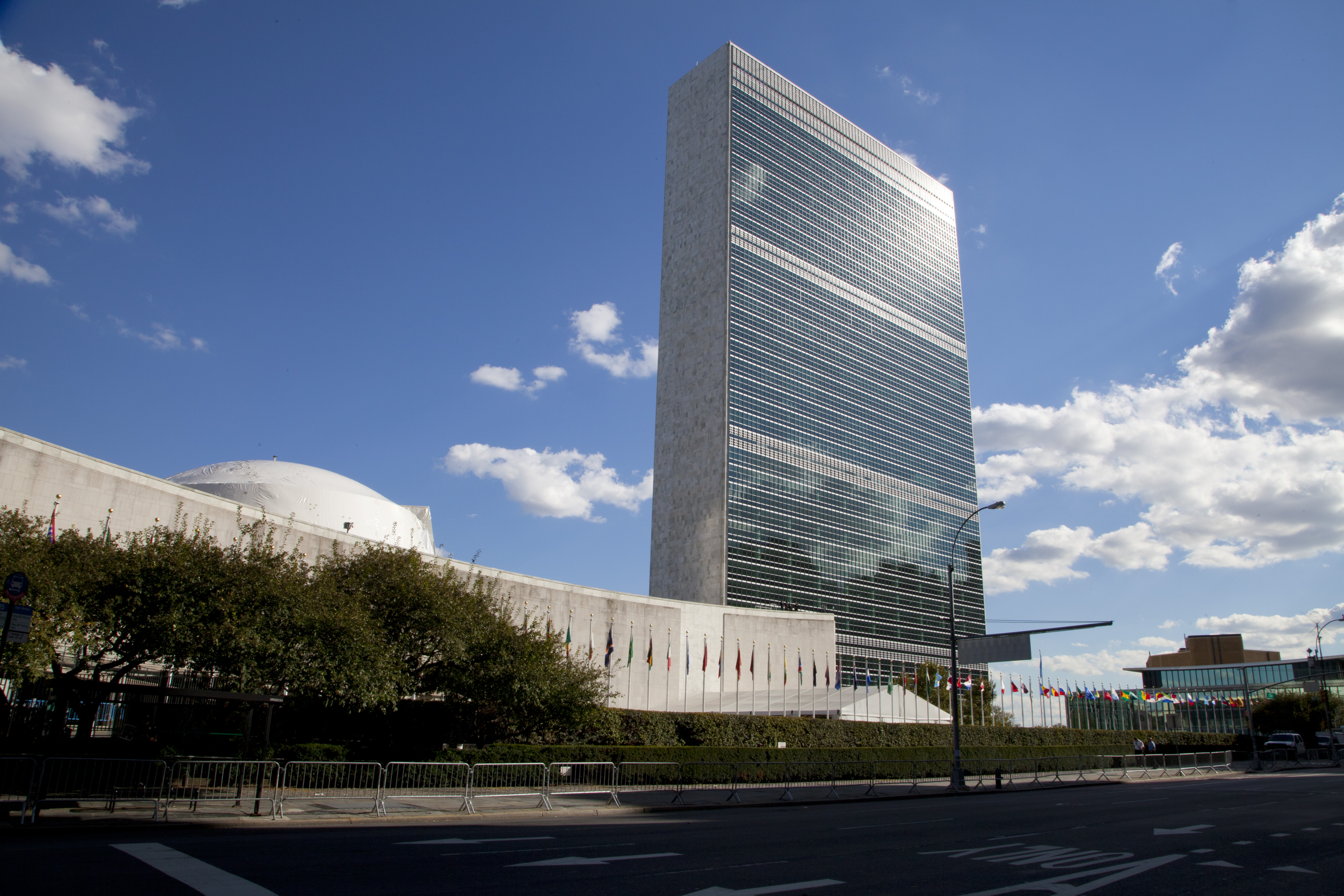
The United Nations Secretariat Building at the United Nations headquarters in New York City

International institutions form a vital part of contemporary international relations.

=== Generalist inter-state organizations ===
==== United Nations ====
The United Nations (UN) is an international organization that describes itself as a "global association of governments facilitating co-operation in international law, international security, economic development, and social equity". It is the most prominent international institution. Many legal institutions follow the same organizational structure as the UN.

==== Organisation of Islamic Cooperation ====
The Organisation of Islamic Cooperation (OIC) is an international organization comprising 57 member states. The organisation seeks to be the collective voice of the Muslim world (Ummah) and to safeguard the interests of Muslims and ensure their progress and well-being.

==== Other ====
Other generalist inter-state organizations include:

- African Union
- Association of Southeast Asian Nations
- Arab League
- BRICS
- Commonwealth of Independent States
- Commonwealth of Nations
- Community for Democracy and Rights of Nations
- Council of Europe
- Economic Community of West African States
- Eurasian Economic Union
- European Union
- Group of Seven
- G20
- Organisation internationale de la Francophonie
- Organization of American States
- Organization of Turkic States
- Pacific Islands Forum
- South Asian Association for Regional Cooperation

=== Regional security arrangements ===
- United Nations Security Council
- Collective Security Treaty Organization
- Council for Security Cooperation in the Asia Pacific
- GUAM Organization for Democracy and Economic Development
- NATO
- Organization for Security and Cooperation in Europe
- Shanghai Cooperation Organisation
- Union of South American Nations

=== Economic institutions ===
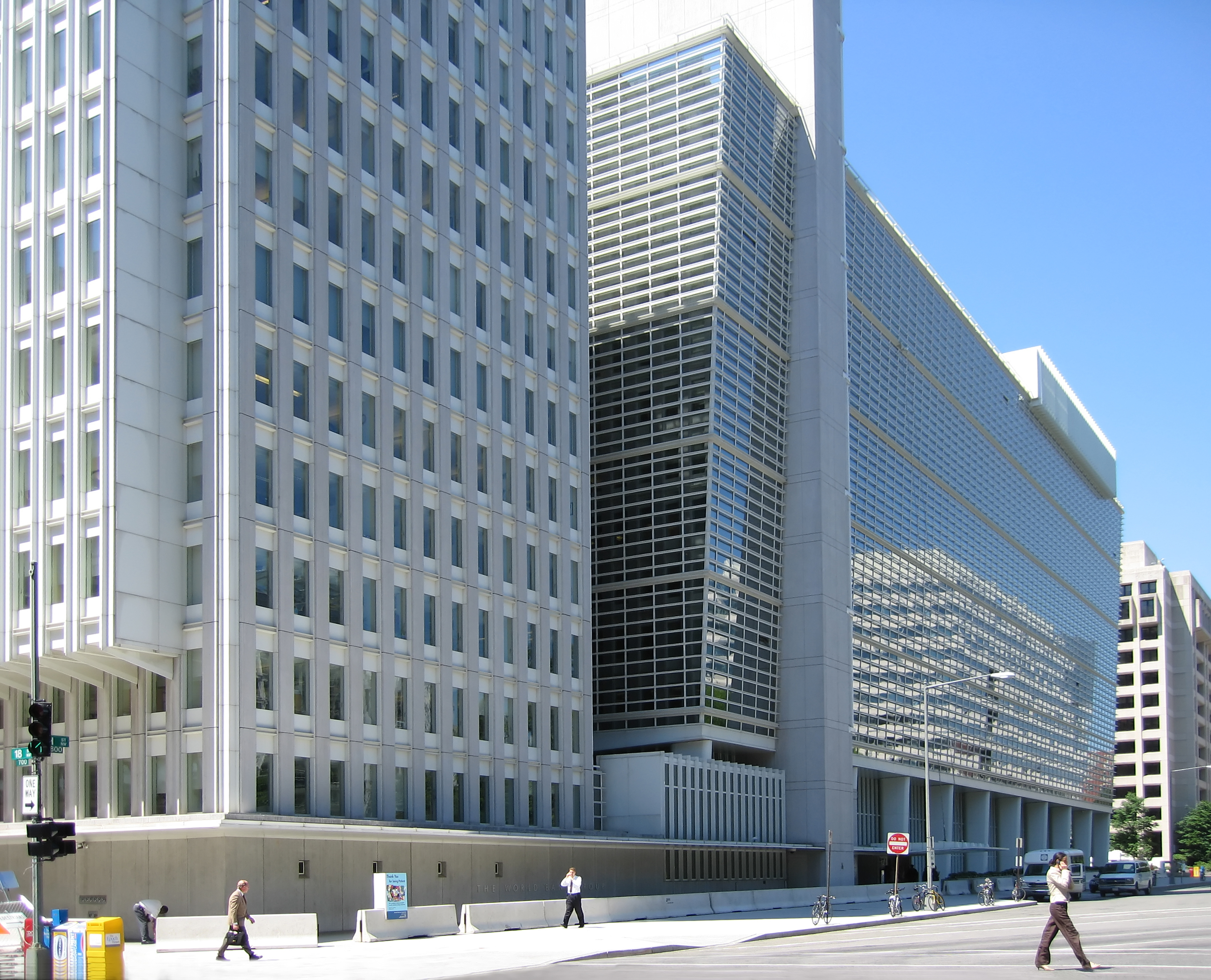
The World Bank headquarters in Washington, D.C.

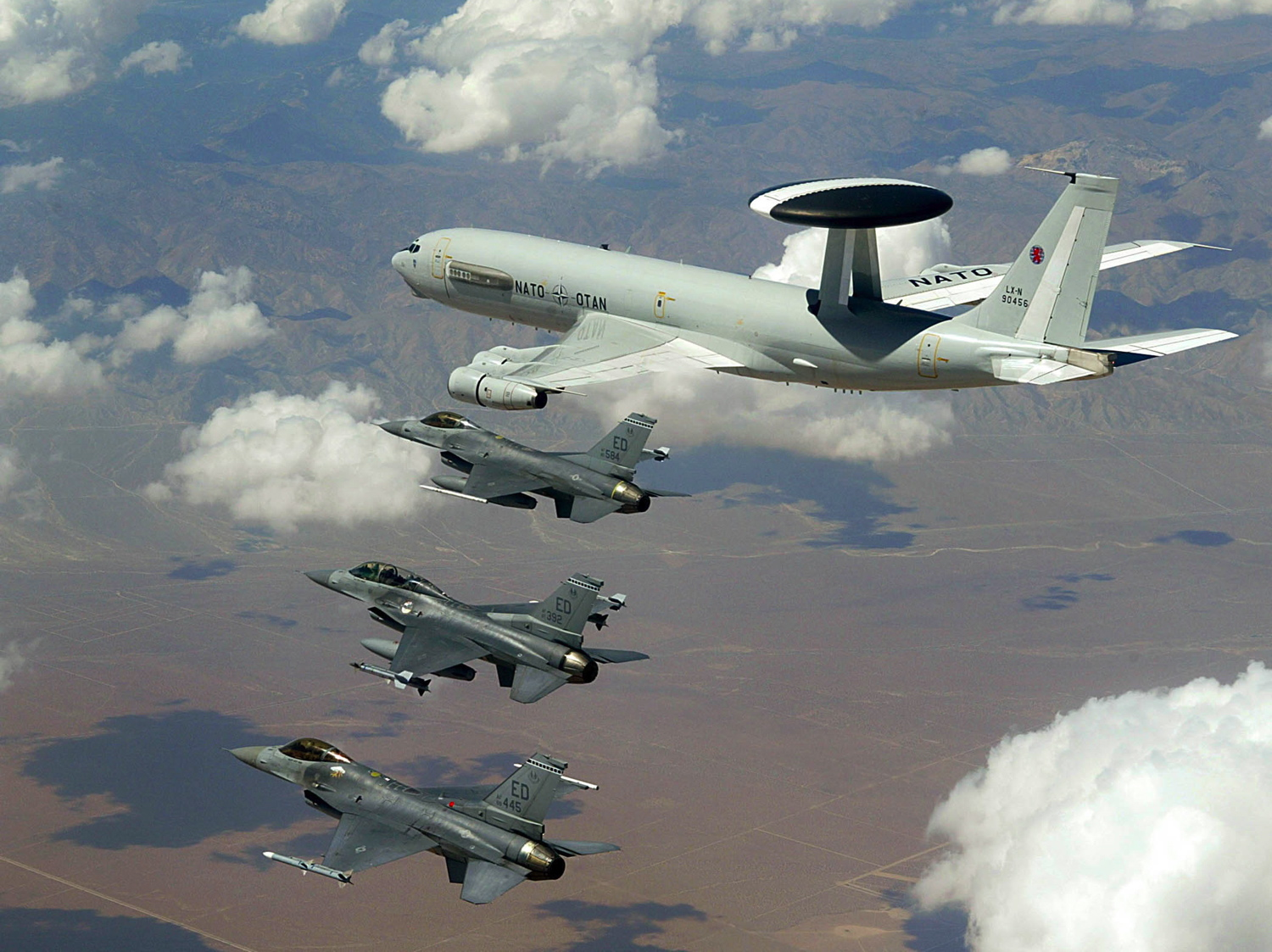
NATO E-3A flying with USAF F-16s in a NATO exercise

- Asian Infrastructure Investment Bank
- Asian Development Bank
- African Development Bank
- Eurasian Development Bank
- European Bank for Reconstruction and Development
- Bank of International Settlements
- Black Sea Trade and Development Bank
- Inter-American Development Bank
- International Bank for Reconstruction and Development
- International Monetary Fund
- Islamic Development Bank
- New Development Bank
- Organization of the Black Sea Economic Cooperation
- World Bank
- World Trade Organization

=== International legal bodies ===
==== Human rights ====
- European Court of Human Rights
- Human Rights Committee
- Inter-American Court of Human Rights
- International Criminal Court
- International Criminal Tribunal for Rwanda
- International Criminal Tribunal for the Former Yugoslavia
- United Nations Human Rights Council

==== Legal ====
- African Court of Justice
- European Court of Justice
- International Court of Justice
- International Tribunal for the Law of the Sea

== See also ==
- Cold War, 1947 to 1991
- Comparative politics
- Diplomatic history
  - Diplomatic history of World War I
  - Diplomatic history of World War II
- The European Institute for International Law and International Relations
- Extraterritoriality
- Geopolitics
- International community
- International order
- List of international relations institutes and organisations
- List of international relations journals
- Multilateralism
- Peace and conflict studies
- Peace economics
- Political geography
- Periods in international relations
  - International relations (1648–1814)
  - International relations (1814–1919)
  - International relations (1919–1939)
  - International relations since 1989
- Responsibility to protect
- Right of conquest
- Security studies
- Soft power

Brief note on 2022–present great-power competition, linking Russian invasion of Ukraine and Indo-Pacific strategies.

Add International Studies Association (https://www.isanet.org/).

== Bibliography ==
- Carlsnaes, Walter; et al., eds. (2012). Handbook of International Relations. SAGE Publications. ISBN 9781446265031.
- Dyvik, Synne L., Jan Selby and Rorden Wilkinson, eds. What's the Point of International Relations (2017)
- Mimiko, [Nahzeem] N. Oluwafemi (2012). Globalization: The politics of global economic relations and international business. Durham, North Carolina, United States: Carolina Academic Press. ISBN 978-1-61163-129-6.
- Reus-Smit, Christian, and Duncan Snidal, eds. The Oxford Handbook of International Relations (2010)

=== Theory ===
- Norman Angell The Great Illusion (London: Heinemann, 1910)
- Raymond Aron Peace and War (English edition 1966)
- Hedley Bull The Anarchical Society (New York: Columbia University Press, 1977)
- Barry Buzan, People, States and Fear
- E. H. Carr The Twenty Years' Crisis (2001) [1939] (New York: Perennial)
- Robert Cooper The Post-Modern State
- Robert W. Cox, Production, Power, and World Order (1987)
- Enloe, Cynthia. "'Gender' Is Not Enough: The Need for a Feminist Consciousness". International Affairs 80.1 (2004): 95–97. Web. 17 Sept. 2013.
- Robert Gilpin, War and Change ín World Politics (1981)
- Joshua S. Goldstein, Long Cycles (1988)
- Goodin, Robert E., and Hans-Dieter Klingemann, eds. A New Handbook of Political Science (1998) ch 16–19 pp 401–78
- John H. Herz, The Nation-State and the Crisis of World Politics (1976)
- Charlotte Hooper "Masculinities, IR and the 'Gender Variable': A Cost-Benefit Analysis for (Sympathetic) Gender Sceptics". International Studies 25.3 (1999): 475–491.
- James C. Hsiang Anarchy & Order: The Interplay of Politics and Law in International Relations 1555875718, 9781555875718 Lynne Rienner Pub 1997
- Andrew Hurrell On Global Order: Power, Values, and the Constitution of International Society (Oxford University Press, 2008). On Global Order: Power, Values, and the Constitution of International Society
- Robert Keohane After Hegemony
- Robert Keohane, ed., Neo-Realism and Its Critics (1986)
- Hans Köchler, Democracy and the International Rule of Law. Vienna/New York: Springer, 1995
- Andrew Linklater Men and citizens in the theory of international relations
- Donald Markwell John Maynard Keynes and International Relations: Economic Paths to War and Peace (Oxford: Oxford University Press, 2006).
- John Mearsheimer The Tragedy of Great Power Politics (2001)
- Hans J. Morgenthau Scientific Man Vs. Power Politics (Chicago: University of Chicago Press, 1946)
- Reinhold Niebuhr Moral Man and Immoral Society 1932
- Joseph Nye Soft Power: The Means to Success in World Politics, Public Affairs Ltd 2004
- A.F.K. Organski, World Politics (New York: Knopf, 1964)
- Paul Raskin The Great Transition Today: A Report from the Future
- Benno Teschke The Myth of 1648 (New York: Verso Press, 2003).
- J. Ann Tickner Gender in International Relations (New York: Columbia University Press, 1992).
- Kenneth Waltz Man, the State, and War
- Kenneth Waltz Theory of International Politics (1979)
- Michael Walzer Just and Unjust Wars 1977
- Alexander Wendt Social Theory of International Politics 1999

=== Textbooks ===
- Baylis, John, Steve Smith, and Patricia Owens. The Globalization of World Politics: An Introduction to International Relations (2011)
- Mingst, Karen A., and Ivan M. Arreguín-Toft. Essentials of International Relations (5th ed. 2010)
- Morgenthau, Hans J. Politics Among Nations (1948 and subsequent editions)
- Nau, Henry R. Perspectives on International Relations: Power, Institutions, Ideas (2008)
- Rochester, J. Martin Fundamental Principles of International Relations (Westview Press, 2010)
- Roskin, Michael G., and Nicholas O. Berry. IR: The New World of International Relations (8th ed. 2009)
- Alexander, F. (1998). Encyclopedia of World History. New York: Oxford University Press

=== History of international relations ===
- Beaulac, Stéphane. "The Westphalian Model in defining International Law: Challenging the Myth", Australian Journal of Legal History Vol. 9 (2004).
- Black, Jeremy. A History of Diplomacy (2010)
- Calvocoressi, Peter. World Politics since 1945 (9th Edition, 2008) 956pp
- E. H. Carr The Twenty Years Crisis (1940), 1919–39
- Kennedy, Paul. The Rise and Fall of the Great Powers Economic Change and Military Conflict From 1500–2000 (1987), stresses economic and military factors
- Kissinger, Henry. Diplomacy (1995), not a memoir but an interpretive history of international diplomacy since the late 18th century
- Krasner, Stephen D.: "Westphalia and All That" in Judith Goldstein & Robert Keohane (eds): Ideas and Foreign Policy (Ithaca, NY: Cornell UP, 1993), pp. 235–264
- New Cambridge Modern History (13 vol 1957–79), thorough coverage from 1500 to 1900
- Ringmar, Erik. History of International Relations Open Textbook Project, Cambridge: Open Book, forthcoming.
- Schroeder, Paul W. The Transformation of European Politics 1763–1848 (Oxford History of Modern Europe) (1994) 920pp; history and analysis of major diplomacy
- Taylor, A.J.P. The Struggle for Mastery in Europe 1848–1918 (1954) (Oxford History of Modern Europe) 638pp; history and analysis of major diplomacy
- Van der Pijl, Kees, The Discipline of Western Supremacy: Modes of Foreign Relations and Political Economy, Volume III, Pluto Press, 2014, ISBN 9780745323183
