= Robert Keohane =

American academic

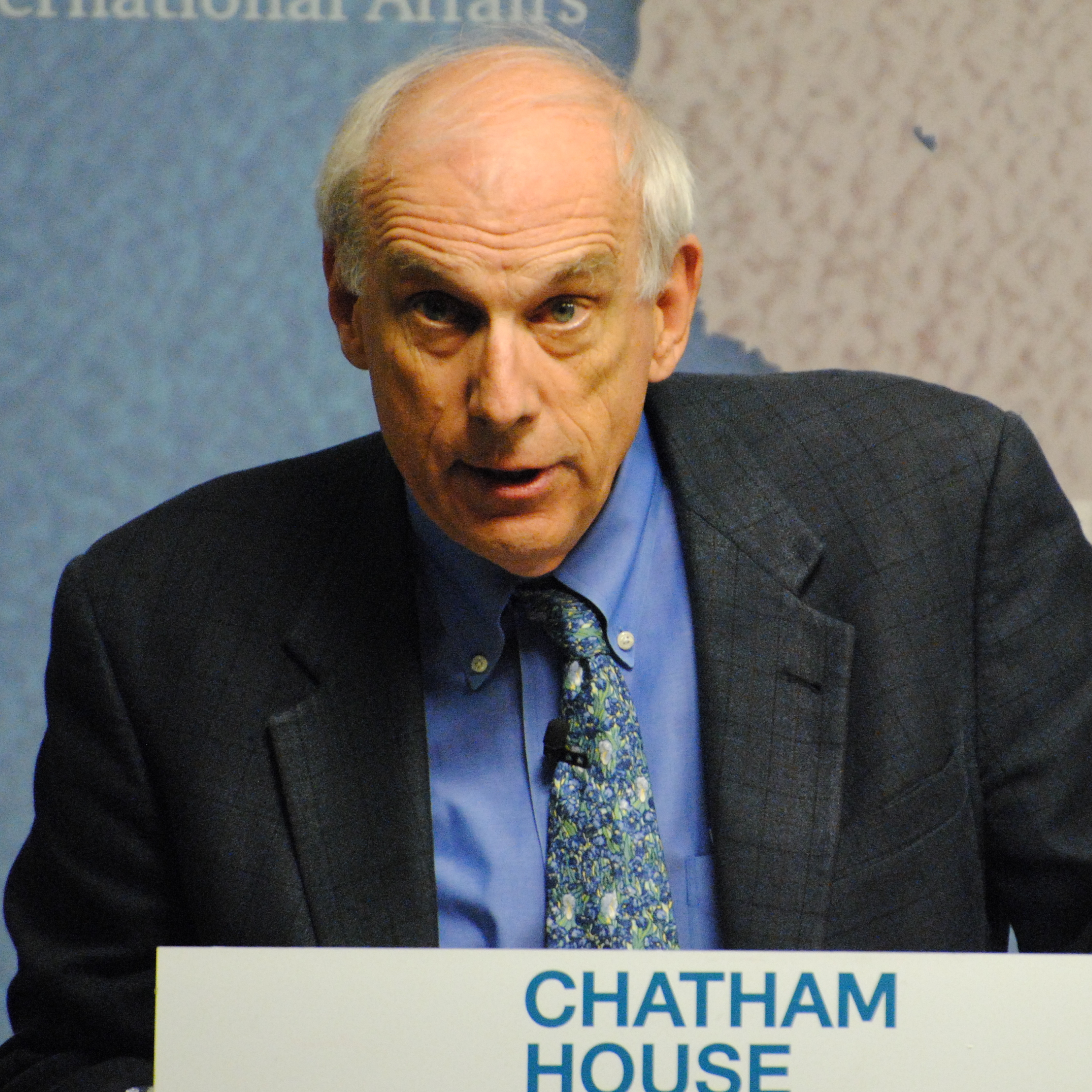
- Keohane in 2015
- Born: Robert Owen Keohane; October 3, 1941 (age 84); Chicago, Illinois, U.S.
- Education: Shimer College (BA); Harvard University (MA, PhD)
- Known for: After Hegemony, "International Institutions: Two Approaches"
- Spouse: Nannerl O. Keohane
- Scientific career
- Fields: Political science
- Institutions: Princeton University; Duke University
- Doctoral advisor: Stanley Hoffmann
- Doctoral students: Beth A. Simmons; Helen Milner; Andrew Moravcsik

Robert Owen Keohane (born October 3, 1941) is an American political scientist working in the fields of international relations and international political economy. Following the publication of his influential book After Hegemony (1984), he has become widely associated with the theory of neoliberal institutionalism in international relations, as well as transnational relations and world politics in international relations in the 1970s.

He is professor emeritus of International Affairs at the Princeton School of Public and International Affairs, and has also taught at Swarthmore College, Duke University, Harvard University and Stanford University. A 2011 survey of International Relations scholars placed Keohane second in terms of influence and quality of scholarship in the last twenty years. According to the Open Syllabus Project, Keohane is the most frequently cited author on college syllabi for political science courses.

== Early life and education ==
Keohane was born at the University of Chicago Hospitals. His education through the fifth grade was at the University of Chicago Laboratory Schools. When he was 10, the family moved to Mount Carroll, Illinois, where he attended public school and his parents taught at Shimer College. After the 10th grade, Keohane enrolled at Shimer through the school's early entrance program, which since 1950 has allowed selected high school students to enter college before completing high school. When later asked to compare his undergraduate education as an early entrant at Shimer with his graduate work at Harvard, Keohane remarked "it is not clear to me that I have ever been with a brighter set of people than those early entrants." Keohane currently serves on the Board of Trustees of Shimer College.

He earned a BA, with honors, from Shimer College in 1961. He obtained his PhD from Harvard in 1966, one year after he joined the faculty of Swarthmore College. He was the student of Harvard University Professor Stanley Hoffmann. He described Judith Shklar as his strongest intellectual mentor during his graduate studies. He has also described Kenneth Waltz and Karl Polanyi as influences.

== Career ==
Keohane has taught at Swarthmore, Stanford, Brandeis, Harvard, and Duke. At Harvard he was Stanfield Professor of International Peace, and at Duke he was the James B. Duke Professor of Political Science.

He is the author of many works, including After Hegemony: Cooperation and Discord in the World Political Economy (Princeton University Press, 1984), for which he was awarded the second annual University of Louisville Grawemeyer Award in 1989 for "Ideas Improving World Order". Keohane describes the process of forming the theoretical insights of After Hegemony as follows during the late 1970s,

In a world of structural Realism and hegemony, the institutionalized policy coordination that we were increasingly observing in the late 1970s seemed an anomaly. How could it emerge consistent with the theory, or was something missing in the theory itself? Was leadership by a single state, based on dominance or hegemony, essential for cooperation? I did not understand the puzzle clearly, much less have an answer, until I attended a meeting at the University of Minnesota, organized by the economist Anne Krueger and sponsored by the National Science Foundation, at which Charles P. Kindleberger spoke about the implications for international relations of “transactions costs,” risk, and uncertainty. I had not even heard of transaction costs before this time, but when I returned to Stanford I began thinking about these issues, aided by friends and colleagues who knew about “the new economics of organization”... I can still remember the “aha” feeling that I had in December 1979, in my Stanford office, looking over the campus, when I recognized the significance of these theories for the understanding of international cooperation.

Keohane has been characterized as a key figure in the development of a discipline of International Political Economy in the United States. Along with Joseph Nye, Keohane coined the concept of complex interdependence to capture the ways in which power had been fragmented and diffused in economic affairs. Robert Keohane coined the term Hegemonic stability theory in a 1980 article for the notion that the international system is more likely to remain stable when a single nation-state is the dominant world power, or hegemon. Keohane's 1984 book After Hegemony used insights from the new institutional economics to argue that the international system could remain stable in the absence of a hegemon, thus rebutting hegemonic stability theory. Keohane showed that international cooperation could be sustained through repeated interactions, transparency, and monitoring.

Keohane played an important role in steering the focus of the journal International Organization from scholarship focused on international organizations to a general IR journal; it is now the leading journal in the field of IR. He joined the journal in 1968. Between 1974 and 1980, he was editor of the journal.

He has been president of the International Studies Association, 1988–1989, and of the American Political Science Association, 1999–2000.

Keohane is a fellow of the American Academy of Arts and Sciences, the American Academy of Political and Social Science and has held a Guggenheim Fellowship and fellowships at the Center for Advanced Study in the Behavioral Sciences and the National Humanities Center. He was awarded the Johan Skytte Prize in Political Science in 2005, and elected to the National Academy of Sciences that same year. In 2007, he was elected to the American Philosophical Society. He was listed as the most influential scholar of international relations in a 2005 Foreign Policy poll.

Political scientists he has taught include Lisa Martin, Andrew Moravcsik, Layna Mosley, Beth Simmons, Ronald Mitchell, and Helen V. Milner. Other students include Fareed Zakaria.

In 2012, Keohane received the Harvard Centennial Medal.

In fall 2013 he is the Allianz Distinguished Visitor at the American Academy in Berlin.

In 2014, he was awarded the James Madison Award of the American Political Science Association.

He was awarded the 2016 Balzan Prize for International Relations: History and Theory.

He received the Quantrell Award.

== Personal life ==
While he was an assistant professor at Swarthmore College, he was an activist against the Vietnam War, and also campaigned for 1968 presidential candidate Eugene McCarthy. Keohane is married to Nannerl O. Keohane, former president of Duke University and Wellesley College and herself a noted political scientist. They have four grown children: Sarah, Stephan, Jonathan, and Nathaniel.

== Books ==
- Transnational Relations and World Politics, co-authored with Joseph S. Nye, Jr. (Harvard University Press, 1972)
- Power and Interdependence: World Politics in Transition (Little, Brown, 1977); with Joseph Nye
- After Hegemony: Cooperation and Discord in the World Political Economy (Princeton University Press, 1984)
- Neorealism and Its Critics (Columbia University Press, 1986)
- International Institutions and State Power: Essays in International Relations Theory (Westview, 1989)
- Designing Social Inquiry: Scientific Inference in Qualitative Research (Princeton, 1994); with Gary King and Sidney Verba
- Power and Governance in a Partially Globalized World (Routledge, New York, 2002)
- Humanitarian Intervention: Ethical, Legal, and Political Dilemmas (Cambridge University Press, 2003); with J. L. Holzgrefe
- The Regime Complex for Climate Change with David G. Victor (2010)
