= Nannerl O. Keohane =

American political theorist

Nannerl Keohane
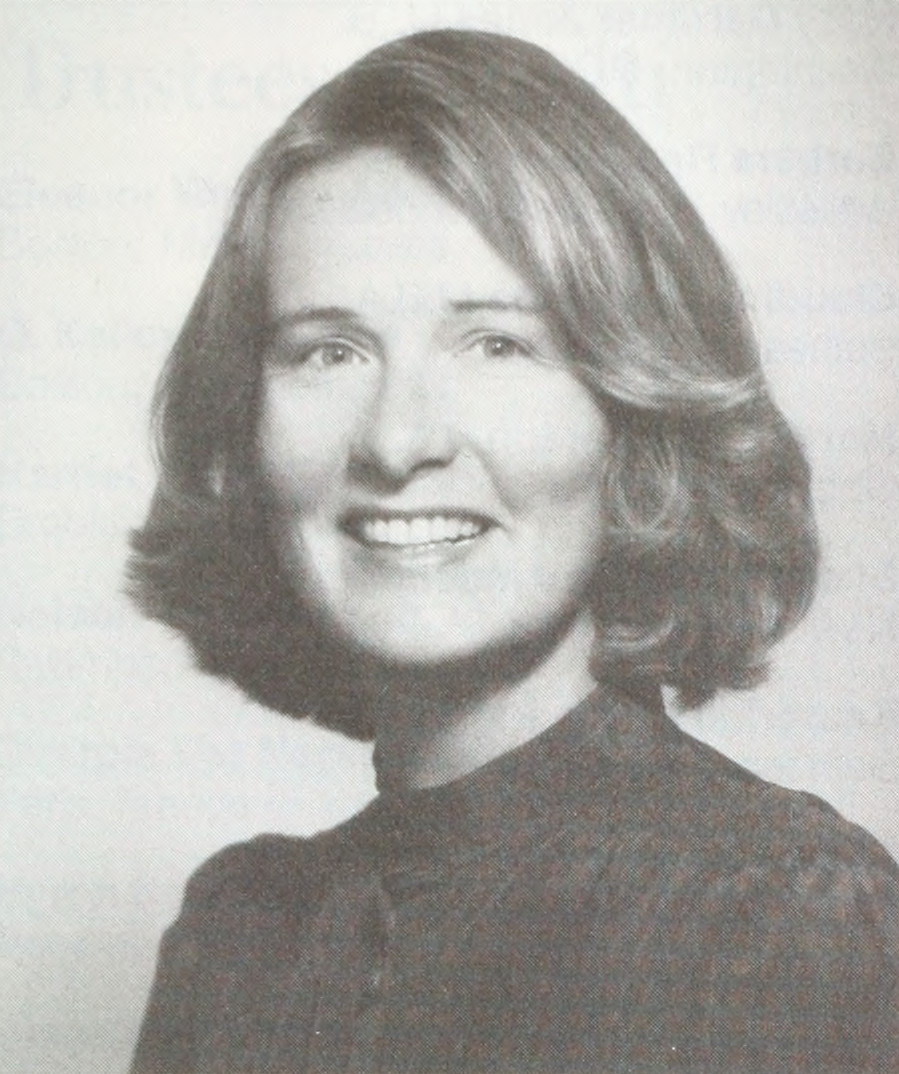
- Keohane in the 1980s

8th President of Duke University
- In office July 1, 1993 – June 30, 2004
- Preceded by: H. Keith H. Brodie
- Succeeded by: Richard H. Brodhead

11th President of Wellesley College
- In office July 1, 1981 – June 30, 1993
- Preceded by: Barbara W. Newell
- Succeeded by: Diana Walsh

Personal details
- Born: Nannerl Overholser; September 18, 1940 (age 86) Blytheville, Arkansas, U.S.
- Education: Wellesley College (BA); Oxford University (BA); Yale University (PhD)

Academic background
- Thesis: Democratic monarchy: The political theory of the Marquis d'Argenson (1968)
- Doctoral advisor: Roger Masters

Academic work
- Discipline: Political science
- Institutions: Swarthmore College; Stanford University; University of Pennsylvania; Wellesley College; Duke University

Nannerl "Nan" Overholser Keohane (born September 18, 1940, in Blytheville, Arkansas) is an American political theorist and former president of Wellesley College and Duke University. Until September 2014, Keohane was the Laurance S. Rockefeller Distinguished Visiting Professor of Public Affairs and the University Center for Human Values at Princeton University. She is now a professor in social sciences at the Institute for Advanced Study, Princeton, where she is researching the theory and practice of leadership in democratic societies.

== Academic career ==
Keohane earned her first undergraduate degree in 1961 from Wellesley College, and her second bachelor's degree at Oxford University as a Marshall Scholar. Keohane received her doctorate in political science from Yale University in 1967.

Keohane began her career in academia teaching at Swarthmore College (1967–73), Stanford University (1973–81), and the University of Pennsylvania (1970-1972). At Stanford, she was chair of the faculty senate and won the Gores Award for Excellence in Teaching, the university's highest teaching honor.

Keohane served as eleventh president of Wellesley from 1981 to 1993, while also continuing to teach political science. At Wellesley, she oversaw increased enrollment of minority students, led the expansion of the Sports Center and the construction of the Davis Museum and Cultural Center, and implemented major advances in technology throughout the campus.

Keohane became the thirteenth president at Duke in 1993. During her tenure, she was also a professor of political science, led efforts to increase minority student enrollment, diversified faculty, and oversaw the Women's Initiative. Keohane also helped raise $2.36 billion during The Campaign for Duke, which ended in 2003, making it the fifth-largest campaign in the history of American higher education.

Keohane left her position at Duke in 2004, and in 2005 was named Laurance S. Rockefeller Distinguished Visiting Professor of Public Affairs at the Woodrow Wilson School and the University Center for Human Values at Princeton University.

Keohane's books include Thinking about Leadership (2010), Philosophy and the State in France: The Renaissance to the Enlightenment (1980), and Feminist Theory: A Critique of Ideology (1982). Some of Keohane's speeches were published in 1995 in A Community Worthy of the Name, and more in 2006 in Higher Ground: Ethics and Leadership in the Modern University.

In 2009-11, Keohane chaired a committee on undergraduate women's leadership at Princeton University, appointed by President Shirley M. Tilghman. She has also launched discussions on the future of women's leadership, and on the future of liberal education.

In fall 2013 she was at the American Academy in Berlin as the Richard C. Holbrooke Distinguished Visitor.

== Other positions ==
In 1991, Keohane was elected to the American Academy of Arts and Sciences. In 1994, she was elected to the American Philosophical Society. Keohane was inducted into the National Women's Hall of Fame in 1995. In 1998, Keohane received the Golden Plate Award of the American Academy of Achievement. She has served on many community and professional bodies, including being active in the Marshall Scholarship Alumni Association.

In 1996, following nearly 3 years of intense litigation over the estate of Doris Duke, Keohane was named as one of the "six people [who] would sit as trustees of the charitable foundations established by Miss Duke's will.". In 2008, Keohane was chair of the Board of Trustees of the Doris Duke Charitable Foundation (DDCF)Home | Doris Duke Foundation during the controversy over the Trustees decision to close and dismantle Duke Gardens, established in 1958 by Doris Duke in honor of her father James Buchanan Duke. Representatives of the DDCF stated that the Gardens were "perpetuating the Duke family history of personal passions and conspicuous consumption."

Keohane is a former member of the Harvard Corporation, the governing body of Harvard University, and a rare member of that body not to have earned a degree from Harvard. In April 2013, Keohane told Harvard students advocating for climate change divestment that they should instead "Thank BP" for its investment in clean energy. The comment caused an uproar among Harvard students, leading climate activist Bill McKibben to tweet the following:

"Harvard behaving outrageously to divestment campaign, trustee urges students to 'thank BP'"

Bill McKibben (@billmckibben) April 10, 2013

== Biographical notes ==
Keohane was born in Blytheville, Arkansas, and graduated from high school in Hot Springs, Arkansas.

Her first husband was Patrick Henry, a Professor of Religion at Swarthmore College.

Her husband is Robert Keohane, also a noted political scientist. Her sister, Geneva Overholser, is a prominent journalist and currently director of the School of Journalism at the University of Southern California. Keohane and her husband have four grown children: Sarah, Stephan, Jonathan, and Nathaniel.

Keohane's last name is often subject to mispronunciation. While the most common pronunciation is Kee-oh-hayne, following the name's phonetics, the correct pronunciation is Koh-hann, incorporating a silent 'e' and a hard 'a'.
