= Nat Keohane =

American economist

- Spouse: Georgia Levenson Keohane

Academic background
- Education: Yale University; Harvard University
- Doctoral advisor: Robert Stavins
- Influences: Martin Weitzman; Richard Zeckhauser

Academic work
- Discipline: Environmental economics
- School or tradition: Environmental economics
- Institutions: Center for Climate and Energy Solutions
- Website: Information at IDEAS / RePEc

Nathaniel O. Keohane is an American environmental economist who serves as president at the Center for Climate and Energy Solutions (C2ES).

Previously, Keohane taught economics at Yale University. He is married to Georgia Levenson Keohane, a Senior Fellow at New America.

== Education and career ==
Keohane received a B.A. in Economics from Yale University in 1993. He went on to receive a Ph.D. in Political Economy and Government from Harvard University in 2001. From 2001 to 2007, he was an Assistant Professor and then associate professor of economics at the Yale School of Management. Keohane then became Director of Economic Policy and Analysis and then Chief Economist at Environmental Defense Fund. While there he played "a leading role in helping to shape the group's advocacy on domestic and international climate policy."

As an expert on environmental policy, Keohane testified before various committees of the United States House of Representatives. His testimony included two appearances before the Energy and Commerce Committee, Subcommittee on Energy and Environment. He also submitted a written statement to a Ways and Means Committee hearing on "Policy Options to Prevent Climate Change".

From January 2011 to mid-2012, Keohane served in the Obama administration as Special Assistant to the President for Energy and Environment in the National Economic Council and Domestic Policy Council, where he helped to develop and coordinate administration policy on a wide range of energy and environmental issues. He rejoined the EDF in September 2012.

Keohane is "noted for his optimism regarding the role markets can play in resolving global warming." Keohane believes most power industry projections of how much it will cost to address global warming are too high. He says estimates tend "to be much higher than the actual costs. The reason is they can't take into account technological innovation." Keohane was an ardent supporter of cap and trade during his first tenure at EDF. He outlined that belief in a 2007 article in which he wrote, "The solution is to harness the power of market forces by establishing firm caps on greenhouse gas emissions… If the government will lead by capping carbon pollution, the primary cause of climate change, the market will respond with investment and innovation on a scale to solve this problem."

In his capacity as special assistant to the President, Nat Keohane was a guest on CNN Tonight, The Diane Rehm Show and interviewed on radio, in relation to a 2012 proposed bill to regulate heat-trapping greenhouse gases, "an important step towards the president's goal of doubling clean energy by 2035," said Keohane.

In 2012, Keohane returned to the Environmental Defense Fund as vice president for Global Climate, and later served as Senior Vice President for Climate. He led EDF's research and policy advocacy on climate change in the United States and globally until 2021.

In July 2021, joined the Center for Climate and Energy Solutions (C2ES) as President of the environmental policy research organization, leading the non-profit in making the case for ambitious and durable climate policies. C2ES partners with business leaders — through their Business Environmental Leadership Council — to develop solutions that will accelerate a low-carbon transition, reduce greenhouse gas emissions and grow an equitable economy.

An accomplished rower while at Yale, he held the Club Singles course record at the Head of the Charles for 20 years after it was set in 1997.

== Personal life ==
His parents, Nannerl O. Keohane and Robert Keohane are both political scholars. His maternal aunt, Geneva Overholser is a prominent journalist.

== Book ==
Markets and the Environment (Second Edition), with Sheila M. Olmstead (Island Press, 5 January 2016)
