= Helen Milner =

American political scientist

Helen V. Milner
- Born: 1958 (age 67–68)

Academic background
- Education: Harvard University

Academic work
- Discipline: International political economy
- Institutions: Princeton University

Notes
- Thesis Resisting the protectionist temptation: industry politics and trade policy in France and the United States in the 1920s and 1970s. (1986)

Helen V. Milner (born 1958) is an American political scientist. She is currently the B. C. Forbes Professor of Public Affairs at Princeton University's School of Public and International Affairs, where she also directs the Niehaus Center for Globalization and Governance. She has written extensively on issues related to international political economy, including international trade, the connections between domestic politics and foreign policy, globalization and regionalism, and the relationship between democracy and trade policy. In 2026, she was elected to the American Philosophical Society.

== Education ==
Milner graduated with a BA (honors) in international relations from Stanford University in 1980 and earned her Ph.D. in political science from Harvard University in 1986.

== Academic career ==
In 1986, she became a professor at Columbia University, where between 2001 and 2004 she held the position of James T. Shotwell Professor of International Relations. She joined Princeton University in 2005, where she served as chair of its Politics department until 2011.

In 2012-2014, she served as president of the International Political Science Association.

In 2021-2022, she served as president of the International Studies Association.

Currently, she is conducting research on issues related to globalization and development, such as the political economy of foreign aid, the digital divide and the global diffusion of the internet, and the relationship between globalization and environmental policy.

== Research ==
In her 1988 book Resisting Protectionism, Milner seeks to explain why U.S. trade policy in the 1920s was more protectionist than in the 1970s, despite many similar underlying conditions. She argues that greater economic interdependence in the latter period created a coalition of actors who stood to gain from trade and thus lobbied against protectionism. The social science research design book Designing Social Inquiry by King, Keohane and Verba characterizes her study as a successful way that qualitative scholars can overcome omitted variable bias.

== Awards ==
- Phi Beta Kappa, Stanford University, 1979.
- Ray Atherton Fellowship in International Relations, Harvard University, 1980–1981 and 1981–1982.
- Teaching Fellowship, Harvard University, 1982–1983.
- Research Fellowship, Brookings Institution, Washington, D.C., 1983–1984.
- Kennedy Traveling Fellowship, Harvard University, 1985, dissertation research in Paris at the Atlantic Institute for International Relations.
- Sumner Prize, awarded by Harvard University for the exceptional thesis in international law and peace, June 1986.
- Summer Fellowship, Columbia University Council for Research in the Humanities and Social Sciences, 1987 and 1988.
- German Marshall Fund Fellowship, 1989-90 (declined).
- Social Science Research Council Advanced Research Fellowship in Foreign Policy Studies, 1989-91.
- Research grants, Institute for Social and Economic Policy Research, Columbia University, 1999-2002.
- Member, Council on Foreign Relations, 2002–present.
- Fellow, American Academy of Arts and Sciences, 2000–present.
- Fellow, Center for Advanced Study in the Behavioral Sciences, Stanford CA., 2001–02.
- Fellow, Bellagio Study and Conference Center, Rockefeller Foundation, Bellagio, Italy, summer 2004.
- Member of the U.S. National Academy of Sciences, elected 2019

== Bibliography ==
=== Books ===
- Milner, Helen V. (1988). Resisting protectionism: global industries and the politics of international trade. Princeton, New Jersey: Princeton University Press. ISBN 9780691010748.
- Milner, Helen V.; Baldwin, David, eds. (1990). The political economy of national security: an annotated bibliography. Boulder, Colorado: Westview Press. ISBN 9780813379081.
- Milner, Helen V.; Baldwin, David, eds. (2014) [1990]. East-west trade and the atlantic alliance. New York: Palgrave Macmillan. ISBN 9781349210510.
- Milner, Helen V., ed. (1993). The Library of International Political Economy (Series). London: Edward Elgar. General editor of multi-volume series.
- Milner, Helen V.; Keohane, Robert, eds. (1996). Internationalization and domestic politics. Cambridge England New York, NY, USA: Cambridge University Press. ISBN 9780521565875.
- Milner, Helen V.; Mansfield, Edward D., eds. (1997). The political economy of regionalism. New York: Columbia University Press. ISBN 9780231106634.
- Milner, Helen V. (1997). Interests, institutions, and information: domestic politics and international relations. Princeton, New Jersey: Princeton University Press. ISBN 9780691011769.
- Milner, Helen V.; Katznelson, Ira, eds. (2002). Political science: state of the discipline. New York Washington, D.C: W.W. Norton for the American Political Science Association. ISBN 9780393978711.
- Milner, Helen V., ed. (2002–2003). The International Library of Writings on the New Global Economy (Series). London: Edward Elgar. Archived from the original on 2016-01-30. General editor of multi-volume series.
- Milner, Helen V.; Moravcsik, Andrew (2009). Power, interdependence, and nonstate actors in world politics. Princeton, New Jersey: Princeton University Press. ISBN 9780691140285.
- Milner, Helen V.; Mansfield, Edward D. (2012). Votes, vetoes, and the political economy of international trade agreements. Princeton, New Jersey: Princeton University Press. ISBN 9781280494222.
- Milner, Helen V.; Tingley, Dustin (2016). Sailing the Water's Edge: The Domestic Politics of American Foreign Policy. Princeton, New Jersey: Princeton University Press. ISBN 9780691165479.
