= Martin Weitzman =

American economist (1942–2019)

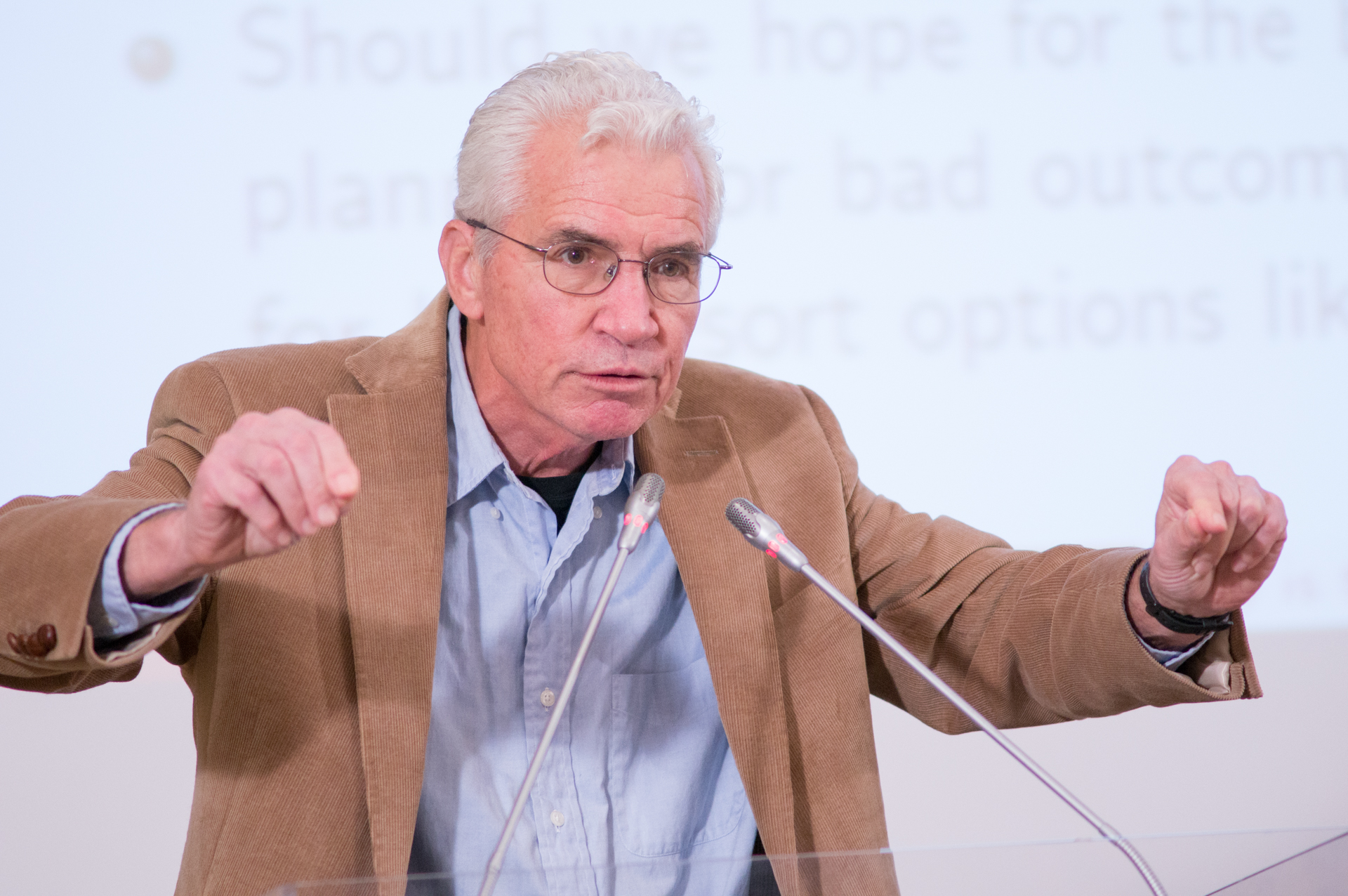
- Born: Meyer Levinger; April 1, 1942; New York City, U.S.
- Died: August 27, 2019 (aged 77); Boston, Massachusetts, U.S.
- Spouse: Jennifer Bäverstam Weitzman

Academic background
- Education: Swarthmore College (BA); Stanford University (MS); Massachusetts Institute of Technology (PhD)
- Doctoral advisor: Robert Solow

Academic work
- Discipline: Environmental economics
- School or tradition: Environmental economics
- Institutions: Harvard University
- Doctoral students: Nat Keohane, Andrew Metrick, Richard G. Newell, Gernot Wagner
- Awards: Top 15 Financial Times-McKinsey Business Book of the Year 2015 for Climate Shock
- Website: Information at IDEAS / RePEc

Martin Lawrence Weitzman (April 1, 1942 – August 27, 2019) was an American economist and a professor of economics at Harvard University. Weitzman joined the Yale University faculty, in 1967, before moving to the Massachusetts Institute of Technology, and then the economics department at Harvard University in 1989, where he taught until his death in 2019. Weitzman was a leading economist whose research was focused largely on environmental economics, specifically climate change and the economics of catastrophes. He is, among others, a co-author, with Gernot Wagner, of Climate Shock, a Top 15 Financial Times-McKinsey Business Book of the Year 2015.

== Personal life ==
Weitzman was born Meyer Levinger on April 1, 1942, on the Lower East Side of Manhattan, the son of Joseph and Helen (Tobias) Levenger. Weitzman's mother died before he was 1. His father returned from military service in World War II and, considering himself unable to care for his son, placed him in an orphanage.

Weitzman was adopted by elementary-school teachers, Samuel and Fannie (Katzelnick) Weitzman, who gave him the name Martin Lawrence Weitzman."

Weitzman graduated with a B.A. in mathematics and physics from Swarthmore College in 1963. He went on to receive a M.S. in statistics and operations research from Stanford University in 1964, and then attended Massachusetts Institute of Technology where he received a Ph.D. in economics in 1967.

== Career ==
Weitzman began his teaching career in 1967 as an assistant professor of economics at Yale University. Three years later, Weitzman was promoted to associate professor, and he remained in this position until 1972 when he joined the faculty at the Massachusetts Institute of Technology as an associate professor. In 1974, Weitzman became a professor at MIT, where he taught until 1989. From 1986 to 1989, Weitzman was recognized as a Mitsui professor at MIT.

In 1989, Weitzman became an Ernest E. Monrad Professor of Economics at Harvard University and remained in this position until his death in 2019. He taught two graduate courses: Ec2680 Environmental and Natural Resource Economics and Ec2690, Environmental Economics and Policy Seminar.

Weitzman also served as a consultant to The World Bank, Stanford Research Institute, International Monetary Fund, Agency for International Development, Arthur D. Little Co., the Canadian Parliamentary Committee on Employment, Icelandic Committee on Natural Resources, and the National Academy Panel on Integrated Environmental and Economic Accounting.

He also served as associate editor of the following publications: Journal of Comparative Economics, Economics Letters, Journal of Japanese and International Economies, Journal of Environmental Economics and Management.

In 2005, Weitzman was arrested on charges of stealing manure from a farm in Rockport MA. A 98-year-old farmer accused Weitzman of multiple manure thefts from the farm, while Weitzman argued he had permission from the farmer's son to take the manure. In return for dismissal of the charges, Weitzman agreed to pay the farmer $600 and to make an additional $300 charitable donation in lieu of performing community service.

Weitzman died by suicide on August 27, 2019, at the age of 77.

== Research ==
Weitzman's research covered a wide range of topics including environmental and natural resource economics, green accounting, economics of biodiversity, economics of environmental regulation, economics of climate change, discounting, comparative economic systems, economics of profit sharing, economic planning, and microfoundations of macro theory.

Much of Weitzman's research was focused on climate change. Traditional cost-benefit analysis of climate change looks at the costs of reducing global warming (the cost of reducing greenhouse gas emissions) versus the benefits (potentially stopping or slowing climate change). However, in most analyses, the damages that would stem from dramatic climate change are not taken into consideration. Weitzman added dramatic climate change to the cost-benefit analysis to show that immediate measures must be taken in climate change regulation.

Weitzman's past research was focused on fixed versus profit sharing wages and their effect on unemployment. He proposed that, when firms use profit sharing wages, meaning employees receive higher wages when a company is doing well, firms have lower rates of unemployment and do better during recessions.

Weitzman was known for his study of price versus quantity controls. Weitzman proposed that when faced with uncertainty the relative slopes of the marginal benefits versus the marginal costs must be examined in order to determine which type of control will be most effective. For example, in the case of pollution, the relative slopes of marginal costs and marginal damages must be examined (the marginal benefits are the avoidance of the marginal damages). His research showed that if the slope of marginal costs is steeper, price controls are more effective and if the relative slope of marginal damages is steeper, then quantity controls are more effective.

Weitzman also derived the Gittins index – a celebrated result in the applied probability literature – independently from (and in parallel to) John C. Gittins.

== Recognition ==
- National Science Foundation Fellow, 1963–1965
- Woodrow Wilson Fellow, 1963–64
- Ford Foundation Dissertation Fellow, 1966
- Guggenheim Fellow, 1970–71
- Fellow of the Econometric Society, 1976–2019
- Fellow of the American Academy of Arts and Sciences, 1986–2019
- Association of Environmental and Resource Economists: Special Award for "Publication of Enduring Quality".
- Keynote speaker, 2002 World Congress of Environmental Economists
- Keynote speaker, 2006 World Congress of Animal Geneticists

== Works ==
=== Books ===
Weitzman wrote three books:

- The Share Economy: Conquering Stagflation;
- Income, Wealth, and the Maximum Principle; and
- Climate Shock, jointly with Gernot Wagner.

In The Share Economy: Conquering Stagflation, Weitzman proposed that a main cause of stagflation is paying workers a fixed wage, regardless of how the company is performing. He introduced an alternate labor payment system as a way of combating stagflation.

Income, Wealth, and the Maximum Principle is a book geared to advanced economic students, particularly those who want to be able to formulate and solve complex allocation problems and who are interested in the relationship between income accounting and wealth or welfare.

Climate Shock details how what we know about global warming is bad and what we do not know is potentially much worse.

=== Papers ===
Weitzman published over 90 papers, many of which appeared in economics journals. His last paper was published in 2019. Several of his papers are listed below:

- Weitzman, M.L. (October 1974). "Prices vs. Quantities" (PDF). The Review of Economic Studies. 41 (4): 477–491. doi:10.2307/2296698. JSTOR 2296698.
- Weitzman, Martin L. (September 2007). "A Review of The Stern Review on the Economics of Climate Change" (PDF). Journal of Economic Literature. XLV (3): 703–724. doi:10.1257/jel.45.3.703.
- Weitzman, Martin L. "Subjective Expectations and Asset-Return Puzzles" (PDF). OpenScholar@Harvard.
- Weitzman, M.L. (2009). "On Modeling and Interpreting the Economics of Catastrophic Climate Change" (PDF). Review of Economics and Statistics. 91 (1): 1–19. doi:10.1162/rest.91.1.1. S2CID 216093786.
- Weitzman, M.L. (2018). "Potentially Large Equilibrium Climate Sensitivity Tail Uncertainty". Economics Letters. 168: 144-146.pii/S0165176518301733?via%3Dihub
- Weitzman, M.L. (2019)."Prices Versus Quantities across Jurisdictions". Journal of the Association of Environmental and Resource Economists. 6 (5): 883–891. doi:10.1086/704493
