= Judith Goldstein (political scientist) =

American political scientist

Judith L. Goldstein
- Education: University of California, Berkeley; Columbia University; University of California, Los Angeles
- Awards: AAAS member
- Scientific career
- Fields: Political science
- Workplaces: Stanford University

Judith L. Goldstein is an American political scientist. She is the Janet M. Peck Professor of International Communication at Stanford University. She studies international political economy, with a particular focus on international trade policy.

== Education and early career ==
Goldstein attended the University of California, Berkeley, graduating with a BA in political science in 1973. She then received a Masters in International Affairs in 1975 from Columbia University. In 1983, she graduated with a PhD in political science from the University of California, Los Angeles. Goldstein joined the faculty at Stanford University in 1981.

== Career ==
Goldstein has been an author or an editor of 6 books. She was the sole author of the 1994 book Ideas, Interests, and American Trade Policy. The book studies the history of American trade policy up to the Presidency of Ronald Reagan. Henry R. Nau wrote that Ideas, Interests, and American Trade Policy argues that these policies "cannot be explained satisfactorily solely in terms of international structural or domestic economic interests", and instead seeks to understand the origins of these policies in terms of "ideas, as well as interests". Thomas W. Zeiler summarised this proposed interaction, writing that Goldstein persuasively argues that "ideas give the pursuit of materialism and power greater credence and, most important, explain the curious anomalies in American trade policy".

Among the books that she has co-edited is Legalization and World Politics, which seeks to develop a common framework for International Relations and International Law scholarship to understand how international law operates in and affects international affairs. Goldstein also co-edited the 2010 Sage series International Institutions with the law professor Richard Steinberg.

Goldstein has been on the editorial boards of International Organization, the World Trade Review, International Studies Quarterly, and World Politics.

A 2019 citation analysis by the political scientists Hannah June Kim and Bernard Grofman listed Goldstein among the top 40 most cited women working as a political scientist at an American university. In the same year, Goldstein was named a member of the American Academy of Arts and Sciences.

== Selected works ==
- Ideas, Interests, and American Trade Policy (1994)
- Legalization and World Politics, editor (2001)
- International Institutions, co-editor (2010)

== Selected awards ==
- Member, American Academy of Arts and Sciences
