= Center for Climate and Energy Solutions =

US Climate Change organization

Center for Climate and Energy Solutions (C2ES)
- Predecessor: Pew Center on Global Climate Change
- Formation: 2011
- Type: Environmental nonprofit organization
- Purpose: Climate change mitigation and adaptation, clean energy transition, resilience, financial investments.
- Headquarters: Arlington, Virginia, United States
- Region served: International
- Methods: Research, analysis, stakeholder engagement, policy advocacy.
- President: Nathaniel Keohane
- Chair of the Board of Directors: Theodore Roosevelt IV
- Website: www.c2es.org

The Center for Climate and Energy Solutions (C2ES) is an environmental nonprofit organization based in Washington, D.C. Launched in 2011, C2ES is the successor to the Pew Center on Global Climate Change. C2ES lobbies policymakers to promote their preferred policies at the state, national, and international levels.

== Leadership ==
Nathaniel Keohane became the president of C2ES in July 2021, following roles as Senior Vice President for Climate at the Environmental Defense Fund and as Special Assistant to the President for Energy and Environment under former president Barack Obama.

Bob Perciasepe, the former deputy administrator of the United States Environmental Protection Agency (EPA), was the organization's president from 2014 to 2021 and now serves as a senior adviser to C2ES. Perciasepe succeeded Eileen Claussen, the center's founding president. The C2ES board of directors is led by Chair Theodore Roosevelt IV.

== Areas of work ==
C2ES aims to advance policies and actions to reduce greenhouse gas emissions, promote and accelerate the renewable energy transition, strengthen adaptation and resilience to climate impacts, and facilitate the necessary financial investments to achieve this. The organization provides information and analysis on the scientific, economic, technological, and policy dimensions of climate and energy challenges. Their solutions are formed by stakeholder processes, bringing together business leaders, the environmental community, policymakers, and other stakeholders to advance climate policy. C2ES supports market-based strategies for cost-effective greenhouse gas emissions reduction.

C2ES produces reports and a broad collection of white papers and briefs by noted climate experts covering a range of critical topics including economics, environmental impacts, policy, science, business, and technology. Experts from the organization have regularly testified before the United States Congress and met with legislators to share ideas for addressing climate change.

Much of their work falls under the following program areas:

- Business Leadership: C2ES convenes the Business Environmental Leadership Council (BELC), the largest U.S.-based association of companies committed to advancing both policy and business solutions to climate change. The Council started with 13 members in 1998, and by 2008 included 44 companies with $2.8 trillion in market capitalization. In 2021, the BELC included 38 mainly Fortune 500 companies with a combined revenue of nearly $3 trillion. The Pew Center also served as a founding and active member of the U.S. Climate Action Partnership (USCAP), an influential business-NGO coalition calling on Congress to establish a mandatory national climate policy.
- Climate Innovation 2050: This initiative launched in 2018 brings together more than three dozen companies from different sectors to examine pathways for decarbonizing the U.S. economy. Climate Innovation 2050 has produced policy briefs and major reports that put the U.S. on a path towards achieving carbon neutrality no later than 2050.
- Climate Resilience: C2ES has published a series of briefs citing strategies to strengthen resilience to climate-related events and extreme weather as well as web pages explaining the link between climate change and extreme weather events. The organization also works with cities, states, and businesses to build resilience to the impacts of climate change.
- Carbon Capture: C2ES co-founded the Carbon Capture Coalition which brings together businesses and organizations to build federal policy support to enable the broad deployment of carbon capture technologies.
- International Climate Policy: C2ES is involved in the UN climate negotiations and organizes informal discussions among key negotiators. The group led discussions before 2015 to explore options for the Paris Agreement.

C2ES has organized sign-on statements with leading businesses to publicize their support for climate action. In 2017, full-page ads published in The New York Times, Wall Street Journal, and New York Post showed a letter from 25 major companies urging President Trump to stay in the Paris Agreement. In December 2020, more than 40 companies called on Congress to work with incoming President Biden to address the threats of climate change, including by rejoining the Paris Agreement. In July 2021, C2ES released a statement signed by 41 companies urging Congress to prioritize clean energy and climate spending as they considered an infrastructure package.

In September 2021, C2ES was selected to form the Executive Secretariat of the Taskforce on Scaling Voluntary Carbon Markets, a new independent governance body to oversee carbon offsets and accelerate the transition to net-zero.

C2ES, and previously the Pew Center on Global Climate Change, has consistently ranked among the world's top environmental think tanks in the Global Go To Think Tank Rankings, a survey of hundreds of scholars and experts conducted by the University of Pennsylvania. It most recently ranking No. 43 for think tanks in the United States and No. 5 for top environment policy think tanks in the world in 2021.

== See also ==
- Low-carbon economy
- Climate change policy of the United States
