= Geneva Overholser =

Journalism consultant and adviser

Geneva Overholser is a journalism consultant and adviser. A former editor of the Des Moines Register, Overholser speaks and writes about the future of journalism. She advises several organizations, including the Trust Project, Report for America, SciLine, the Democracy Fund and the Public Face of Science project at the Academy of American Arts and Sciences.

== Professional activity ==
Overholser is a former senior fellow at the Democracy Fund. She was editor of the Des Moines Register when the paper won a Pulitzer Gold Medal for Public Service for a series on an Iowa woman who was raped. The woman's name and photographs were used in the story, sparking a national debate on the naming of rape victims.

Overholser was professor and director of the USC Annenberg School of Journalism from 2008 to 2013. She was the ombudsman for The Washington Post from 1995 to 1998 and then served as a columnist for the Washington Post Writers Group.

As editor of The Des Moines Register newspaper from 1988 to 1995, she earned the award of Gannett Editor of the Year in 1990, and was named Best in the Business by the American Journalism Review and Editor of the Year by the National Press Foundation.

She was a Nieman Fellow at Harvard, and is a fellow of the American Academy of Arts and Sciences, and of the Society of Professional Journalists.

She co-edited, with Kathleen Hall Jamieson, the book "The Press" in the Oxford series, Institutions of American Democracy. She is the author of "On Behalf of Journalism: A Manifesto for Change."

== Board positions ==
Former:

- Women's Media Center
- Academy of American Poets
- Committee of Concerned Journalists
- Carnegie Endowment for International Peace
- Knight fellowships at Stanford
- Journalism advisory committee of the Knight Foundation
- Journalism advisory committee of the Poynter Institute
- American Society of Newspaper Editors
- Center for Public Integrity (chair)
- Washington Bureau of the School of Journalism, University of Missouri (chair): 2000-2008
- Pulitzer Prizes at the Columbia University Graduate School of Journalism
- Editorial board of the New York Times: 1985-1988

Current:

- Rita Allen Foundation
- Northwestern University in Qatar
- CUNY Graduate School of Journalism Foundation

== Background ==
She is the daughter of Reverend Overholser. She earned her undergraduate degree from Wellesley College in 1970, and a Masters of Science in Journalism from Northwestern University Medill School of Journalism in 1971. She has received Alumnae Achievement Awards from Wellesley, Medill and Northwestern, as well as honorary doctorates from Grinnell College and St. Andrews College.

Overholser worked as a reporter for the Colorado Springs SUN from 1971 to 1974. She lived and worked overseas, in Kinshasa (then Zaire, now Congo) and in Paris, from 1974 to 1979. She is the sister of Nannerl Overholser Keohane, former president of Wellesley College and Duke University, and of Knowles Arthur Overholser, an associate dean of engineering at Vanderbilt University. She currently lives in New York City
