= After Hegemony =

1984 book by Robert Keohane

After Hegemony: Cooperation and Discord in the World Political Economy
- Author: Robert Keohane
- Language: English
- Genre: Non-fiction
- Publication date: 1984

After Hegemony (full title: After Hegemony: Cooperation and Discord in the World Political Economy) is a book by Robert Keohane first published in 1984. It is a leading text in the liberal institutionalist international relations scholarship. The book challenges neorealist claims that meaningful international cooperation is not possible, as well as hegemonic stability theory claims that international cooperation is only possible under hegemony. The book applies insights from new institutional economics to international relations. The book shows how realist assumptions about actors and the international system can logically lead to the conclusion that meaningful cooperation is possible.

== Content ==
The author shows that multilateral cooperation is possible in the absence of a hegemonic power. The crisis of multilateralism brought on by the United States at the end of World War II does not necessarily mean the end of multilateralism. Keohane thus fights against the idea that the decline of American power necessarily leads to the disappearance of international regimes.

The central thesis of Keohane, resolutely neo-institutionalist, is that multilateral institutions are useful to states. A greater institutionalization of international life, namely the development of international agreements, international regimes or international organizations, would make it possible to manage or even control global conflicts.

Keohane describes the process of forming the theoretical insights of After Hegemony as follows during the late 1970s,

In a world of structural Realism and hegemony, the institutionalized policy coordination that we were increasingly observing in the late 1970s seemed an anomaly. How could it emerge consistent with the theory, or was something missing in the theory itself? Was leadership by a single state, based on dominance or hegemony, essential for cooperation? I did not understand the puzzle clearly, much less have an answer, until I attended a meeting at the University of Minnesota, organized by the economist Anne Krueger and sponsored by the National Science Foundation, at which Charles P. Kindleberger spoke about the implications for international relations of “transactions costs,” risk, and uncertainty. I had not even heard of transaction costs before this time, but when I returned to Stanford I began thinking about these issues, aided by friends and colleagues who knew about “the new economics of organization”... I can still remember the “aha” feeling that I had in December 1979, in my Stanford office, looking over the campus, when I recognized the significance of these theories for the understanding of international cooperation.
