= Iran =

Country in West Asia

Islamic Republic of Iran جمهوری اسلامی ایران Jomhuri-ye Eslâmi-ye Irân
- Flag Emblem
- Motto: اَللَّٰهُ أَكْبَرُ; Allāhu ʾAkbar (Takbir); "God is the Greatest"; (de jure); استقلال، آزادی، جمهوری اسلامی; Esteghlâl, Âzâdi, Jomhuri-ye Eslâmi; "Independence, freedom, the Islamic Republic"; (de facto)
- Anthem: سرود ملی جمهوری اسلامی ایران; Sorud-e Melli-ye Jomhuri-ye Eslâmi-ye Irân "National Anthem of the Islamic Republic of Iran"
- Capital and largest city: Tehran; 35°41′N 51°25′E
- Official languages: Persian
- Ethnic groups (2025): 61% Persians (Note: Includes Gilaks and Mazanderanis.); 16% Azerbaijanis; 10% Kurds; 6% Lurs; 2% Arabs; 2% Baloch; 2% Turkmen and Turkic tribes; 1% others
- Demonym: Iranian
- Government: Unitary presidential (Note: Ultimate authority is vested in the Supreme Leader, a position above the President.) theocratic Islamic republic under an authoritarian dictatorship
  - Supreme Leader: Mojtaba Khamenei
  - President: Masoud Pezeshkian
  - First Vice President: Mohammad Reza Aref
  - Speaker of the Assembly: Mohammad Bagher Ghalibaf
  - Chief Justice: Gholam-Hossein Mohseni-Eje'i
- Legislature: Islamic Consultative Assembly

Formation
  - Median kingdom: c. 678 BC
  - Achaemenid Empire: 550 BC
  - Parthian Empire: 247 BC
  - Sasanian Empire: 224 AD
  - Iranian Intermezzo: 821
  - Safavid Iran: 22 December 1501
  - Afsharid Iran: 22 January 1736
  - Zand Iran: 1751
  - Qajar Iran: 20 March 1794
  - Constitutional Revolution: 12 December 1905
  - Pahlavi Iran: 15 December 1925
  - Iranian Revolution: 11 February 1979
  - Islamic Republic established: 1 April 1979
  - Current constitution: 3 December 1979
  - Constitutional amendment: 28 July 1989

Area
  - Total: 1,648,195 km^{2} (636,372 sq mi) (17th)
  - Water (%): 1.63 (as of 2015)

Population
  - 2025 estimate: ▲92,417,681 (17th)
  - Density: 52/km^{2} (134.7/sq mi) (163rd)
- GDP (PPP): 2026 estimate
  - Total: ▼$1.773 trillion (26th)
  - Per capita: ▼$20,159 (98th)
- GDP (nominal): 2026 estimate
  - Total: ▼$311.950 billion (51st)
  - Per capita: ▼$3,548 (139th)
- Gini (2023): ▲35.9 medium inequality
- HDI (2023): ▲0.799 high (75th)
- Currency: Iranian rial (ریال) (IRR)
- Time zone: UTC+3:30 (IRST)
- Calling code: +98
- ISO 3166 code: IR
- Internet TLD: .ir; ایران.

Iran, (Note: English: /ɪ.ˈrɑːn/ ih-RAHN Persian: ایران, romanized: Irân, pronounced [ʔiːˈɾɒːn]) officially the Islamic Republic of Iran, (Note: Persian: جمهوری اسلامی ایران, romanized: Jomhuri-ye Eslâmi-ye Irân, pronounced [dʒomhuːˈɾiːje eslɒːˈmiːje ʔiːˈɾɒːn].) and historically known as Persia, (Note: English: /ˈpɜːrʒə/ PUR-zhə.; Persian: پارس, romanized: Pârs, pronounced [pʰɒːɹs]) is a country in West Asia. It borders Iraq to the west; Turkey, Azerbaijan, and Armenia to the northwest; the Caspian Sea to the north, Turkmenistan to the northeast; Afghanistan to the east; Pakistan to the southeast; and the Gulf of Oman and the Persian Gulf to the south. With a population of over 92 million, Iran ranks 17th globally in both geographic size and population. It is divided into five regions with 31 provinces. Tehran is the nation's capital and largest city and serves as its primary economic center.

Home to one of the world's oldest continuous major civilizations, the territory of present-day Iran was first unified under the Medes in the 7th century BC and reached its territorial height in the 6th century BC, when Cyrus the Great founded the Achaemenid Empire. Alexander the Great conquered the empire in the 4th century BC. An Iranian rebellion in the 3rd century BC established the Parthian Empire, which later liberated the country. In the 3rd century AD, the Parthians were succeeded by the Sasanian Empire, which oversaw a golden age in the history of Iranian civilization. Ancient Iran saw some of the earliest developments of writing, agriculture, urbanization, religion, and administration. Once a center for Zoroastrianism, Iran underwent Islamization following the 7th century Muslim conquest. Innovations in literature, philosophy, mathematics, medicine, astronomy and art were renewed during the Islamic Golden Age and Iranian Intermezzo, a period during which Iranian Muslim dynasties ended Arab rule and revived the Persian language. This era was followed by Seljuk and Khwarazmian rule, Mongol conquests and the Timurid Renaissance from the 11th to 14th centuries.

In the 16th century, the native Safavid dynasty re-established a unified Iranian state with Twelver Shia Islam as the official religion, laying the framework for the modern state of Iran. During the Afsharid Empire in the 18th century, Iran was a leading world power, but it lost this status after the Qajars took power in the 1790s. The early 20th century saw the Persian Constitutional Revolution and the establishment of the Pahlavi dynasty by Reza Shah, who ousted the last Qajar Shah in 1925. Following the Anglo-Soviet invasion of Iran in 1941, his son Mohammad Reza Pahlavi rose to power. Attempts by Mohammad Mosaddegh to nationalize the oil industry led to the Anglo-American coup in 1953.

The Iranian Revolution in 1979 overthrew the monarchy, and the Islamic Republic of Iran was established by Ruhollah Khomeini, the country's first supreme leader. In 1980, Iraq invaded Iran, sparking the eight-year-long Iran–Iraq War. Iran has since been involved in proxy wars with Israel and Saudi Arabia; in 2025, Israeli strikes on Iran escalated tensions into the Twelve-Day War. Following the war and amid a growing economic crisis, the largest protests since 1979 erupted in 2025. The United States and Israel launched a war with Iran in 2026, after they assassinated supreme leader Ali Khamenei. His son, Mojtaba Khamenei, was elected as his successor.

Iran's government is a theocratic Islamic republic governed by elected and unelected institutions, with ultimate authority vested in the supreme leader. While it holds elections, key offices, including the head of state and military, are not subject to public vote. The Iranian government is an authoritarian regime which has been widely criticized internationally due to its poor human rights record, including restrictions on freedom of assembly, expression, and the press, as well as its treatment of women, ethnic minorities, and political dissidents. The Iranian economy is centrally planned with significant state ownership in key sectors. It is a regional power, due to its large reserves of fossil fuels, natural gas supply and oil reserves, its geopolitically significant location, and its role as the world's focal point of Shia Islam. Iran is a threshold state with one of the most scrutinized nuclear programs. It is a founding member of the UN and a member state of numerous international organizations. Iran has 30 UNESCO World Heritage Sites (the 10th-highest in the world) and ranks 4th in intangible cultural heritage or human treasures.

== Etymology ==
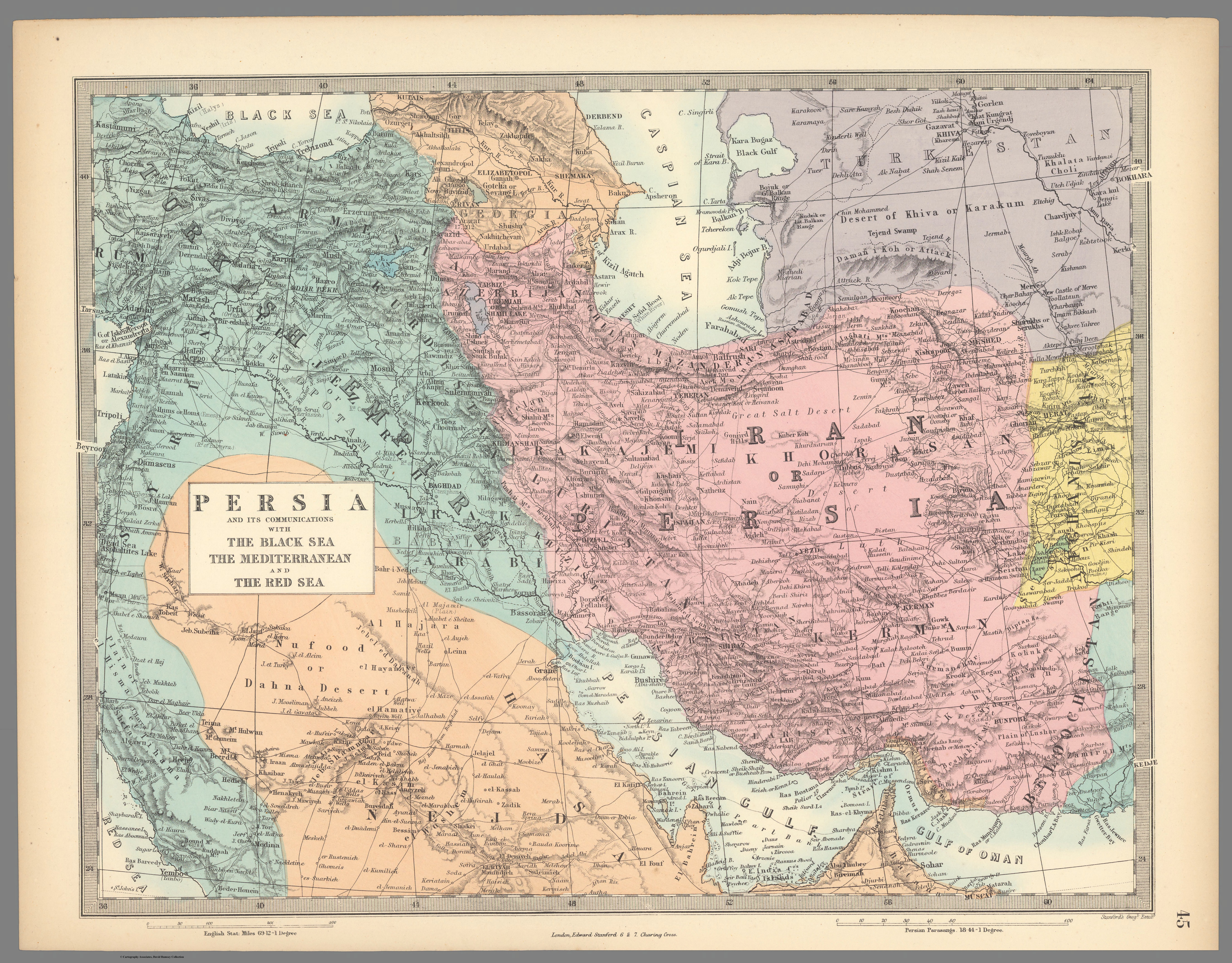
A map of West Asia in 1872, with "Iran or Persia", ruled by the Qajar dynasty, shaded in pink.

Historically, Iran was commonly referred to as "Persia" in the Western world. Likewise, the modern-day ethnonym "Persian" was typically used as a demonym for all Iranian nationals, regardless of whether or not they were ethnic Persians. This terminology prevailed until 1935, when, during an international gathering for Nowruz, the Shah of Iran, Reza Shah Pahlavi officially requested that foreign delegates begin using the endonym "Iran" in formal correspondence. Subsequently, "Iran" and "Iranian" were standardised as the terms referring to the country and its citizens, respectively.

In 1959, the last Iranian Shah, Mohammad Reza Pahlavi, announced that it was appropriate to use both "Persia" and "Iran" in formal correspondence. Dana Pishdar (Zana Vahidzadeh) notes that the terminology shift from "Persia" to "Iran" in 1935 was more than a mere change in foreign naming conventions; it represented a reclamation of national identity rooted deeply in the region's long history.

A variety of scholars from the Middle Ages, such as the Khwarazmian polymath Al-Biruni, also used terms like "Xuniras" (Avestan: Xvaniraθa-, transl. "self-made, not resting on anything else") to refer to Iran: "which is the center of the world, [...] and it is the one wherein we are, and the kings called it the Iranian realm."

== History ==
=== Prehistory ===
The earliest known presence of hominins in Iran dates to around 800,000 years ago, in the Middle Paleolithic. Many Middle Paleolithic sites have been discovered, mainly in the Zagros Mountains in western Iran and some sites associated with Neanderthals. The Zarzian culture is documented in Iran during the Epipaleolithic (25,000–11,500 years ago). Agriculture first appeared in Iran some 12,000 years ago alongside better-documented settlements in the Fertile Crescent. The Chogha Golan site featured early domestication of emmer wheat. The contemporary site of Ganj Dareh also features the earliest known domestication of goats around 10,000 years ago.

The ancient city of Susa, which would become the capital of Elam and later a capital city of the Achaemenid empire, was first settled in 4400–4200 BC, adjacent to the modern site of Shush, Iran. The Kura–Araxes culture (c. 3400 – c. 2000 BC) existed in northwestern Iran and the Caucasus.

=== Antiquity ===
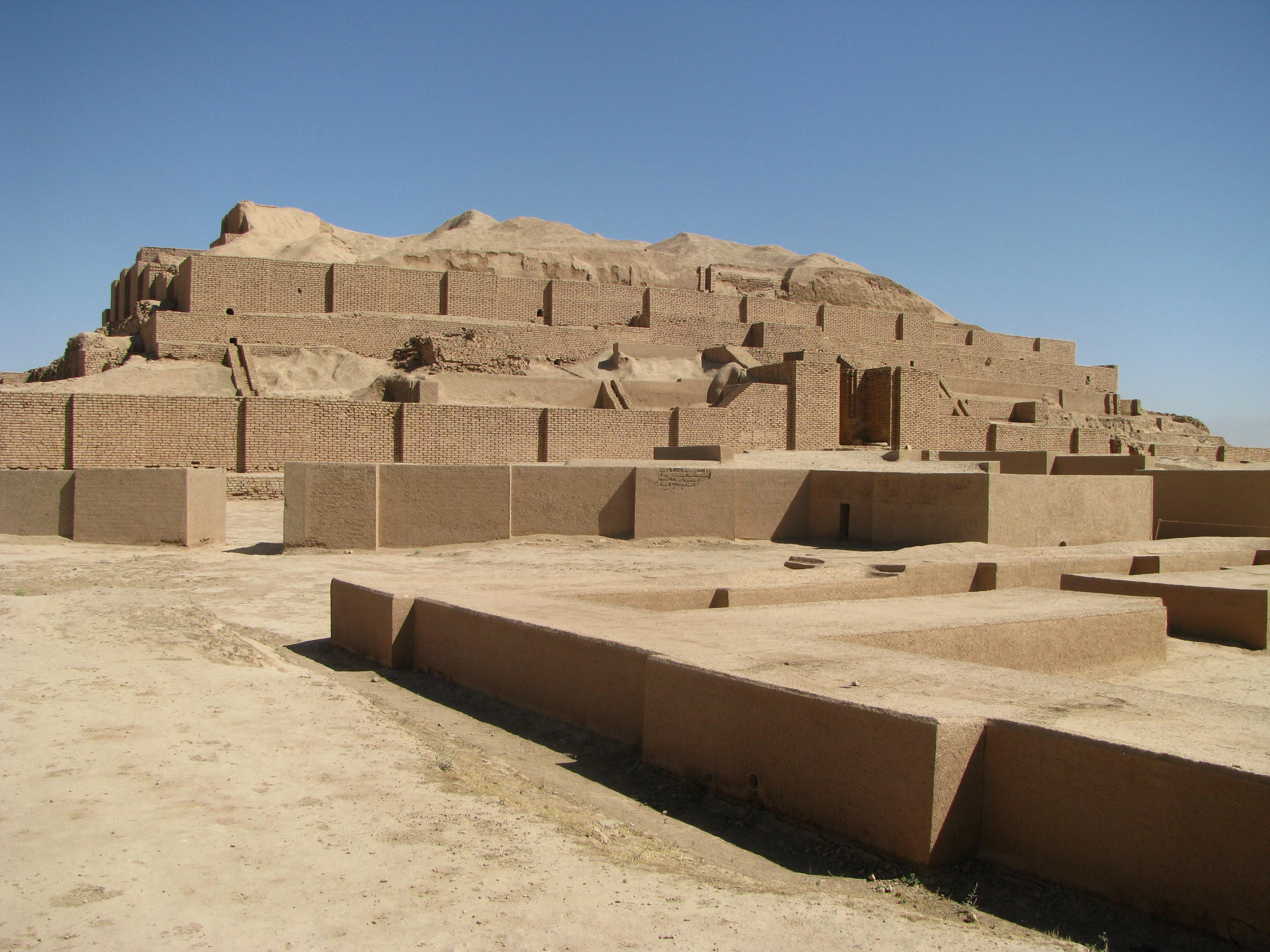
Chogha Zanbil is one of the few extant ziggurats outside of Mesopotamia and considered the best-preserved example in the world.

Iran is home to one of the world's oldest continuous major civilizations, with historical and urban settlements dating back to 4000 BC, including the Jiroft culture in southeastern Iran. Inscriptions in the Proto-Elamite script, which predates cuneiform, have been found from the early third millennium BC. The western part of the Iranian plateau participated in the traditional ancient Near East with Elam (3200–539 BC), and later with other peoples such as the Kassites, Mannaeans, and Gutians. The earliest Iranian peoples began to arrive from Central Asia in the 2nd millennium BC.

The Median dynasty ruled the earliest Iranian state. In 612 BC, Cyaxares and the Babylonian king Nabopolassar invaded Assyria and destroyed Nineveh, the Assyrian capital, which led to the fall of the Neo-Assyrian Empire. The Medes later conquered and dissolved Urartu as well.

==== Achaemenid Empire ====
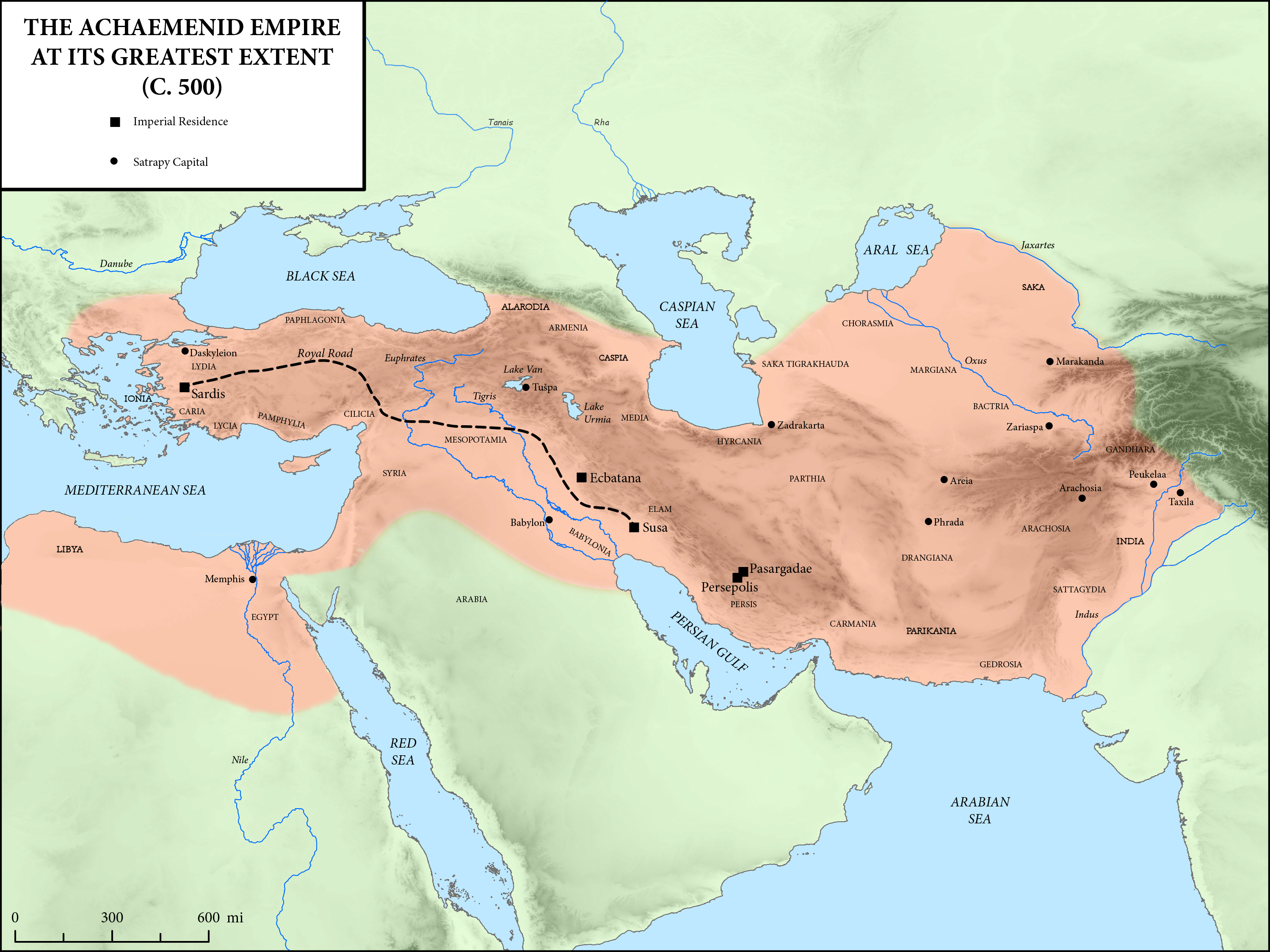
The Achaemenid Empire, or the First Persian Empire, at its greatest extent

The Achaemenids united all Persian tribes under Cambyses I. Under his son, Cyrus the Great, the Achaemenids defeated the Medes and established the Achaemenid Empire, the largest-ever Iranian state. Cyrus conquered the Lydian and Neo-Babylonian empires, creating an empire far larger than Assyria. His son, Cambyses II (r. 530–522 BC), conquered the last major power of the region, ancient Egypt, causing the collapse of its twenty-sixth dynasty.

After the death of Cambyses II, Darius the Great (r. 522–486 BC) ascended the throne by overthrowing the Achaemenid monarch Bardiya. Darius' first capital was at Susa, and he started the building program at Persepolis. He improved the extensive road system, and during his reign the first recorded mentions are made of the Royal Road, a highway from Susa to Sardis.

In 499 BC, Athens supported a revolt in Miletus, resulting in the sacking of Sardis. This led to the Greco-Persian Wars, which lasted the first half of the 5th century BC. In the First Persian invasion of Greece, Persian general Mardonius re-subjugated Thrace and made Macedon a full part of Persia. Darius' successor Xerxes I (r. 486–465) launched the Second Persian invasion of Greece. At a crucial moment in the war, about half of mainland Greece was overrun by the Persians, including territories to the north of the Isthmus of Corinth. This was reversed by a Greek victory following the battles of Plataea and Salamis, during which Persia lost all of its footholds in Europe, and withdrew from it.

The empire entered a period of decline. From 334 BC to 331 BC, Alexander the Great defeated Darius III (r. 336–330 BC) in the battles of Granicus, Issus and Gaugamela, swiftly conquering the Achaemanid Empire by 331 BC. Alexander's empire collapsed after his death; his general, Seleucus I Nicator, tried to take control of Iran, Mesopotamia, Syria, and Anatolia. His empire was the Seleucid Empire.

==== Parthian and Sasanian empires ====
The Arsacids of Parthia, initially Seleucid vassals, originated as leaders of the Iranian (Note: The Parni was an eastern Iranian tribe established on the Amu Darya in the confederation of Dahae. To Yarshater, they were a Saka tribe, who penetrated Parthia, adopted its language, and eventually challenged the Seleucids' power in Parthia.) Parni tribe in the northeastern steppes. The Parthians gradually challenged Seleucid rule over Iran, eventually securing control through the 142 BC conquest of Babylonia. Although fighting continued, the death of Antiochus VII Sidetes in 129 BC marked the collapse of the Seleucid Empire, which then lingered on as a rump state in Syria until conquered by the Roman Empire in the 60s BC.

The Sasanian Empire at its greatest extent c. 620, under the reign of Khosrow II

The Parthian Empire endured for five centuries, but civil wars destabilized it. Parthian power evaporated when Ardashir I revolted against the Arsacids and killed their last ruler, Artabanus IV, in 224 AD. Ardashir established the Sasanian Empire, which ruled Iran and much of Near East. At their zenith, the Sasanians controlled all of modern-day Iran and Iraq and parts of the Arabian Peninsula, as well as the Caucasus, the Levant, and parts of Central and South Asia.

The strong economic conditions left by Parthians allowed the Sasanians to build a powerful and distinctive economic state whose reputation spread well beyond its political frontiers and time. The Sasanian Empire was characterized by a complex and centralized government bureaucracy and the revitalization of Zoroastrianism as a legitimizing and unifying ideal.

=== Medieval period ===
Most of the Sasanian Empire's lifespan was overshadowed by the frequent Byzantine–Sasanian wars, a continuation of the Roman–Parthian Wars. The last of these wars ultimately contributed to the empire's fall, which culminated with the Islamic conquest of Persia. The Rashidun Caliphate conquered the Sasanian Empire between 632 and 654.

Over time, the majority of Iranians converted to Islam. Most of the aspects of the previous Persian civilizations were not discarded, but rather absorbed by the new Islamic polity.

==== Early Islamic rule and regional resistance in Iran ====
After the fall of the Sasanian Empire in 651, the Arabs of the Umayyad Caliphate adopted many Persian customs, especially the administrative and the court mannerisms. Arab provincial governors were undoubtedly either Persianized Arameans or ethnic Persians; certainly, Middle Persian remained the language of official business of the caliphate until the adoption of Arabic toward the end of the seventh century.

However, Iran was still not entirely under Arab control; the Daylam region was under the control of the Daylamites, Tabaristan was under Dabuyid and Paduspanid control, and Mount Damavand under Masmughan control. Arabs had invaded these regions several times but the regions' inaccessible terrain prevented a decisive result. The most prominent ruler of the Dabuyids, Farrukhan the Great (r. 712–728), managed to hold his domains during his long struggle against the Arab general Yazid ibn al-Muhallab, who was defeated by a combined Daylamite–Dabuyid army and forced to retreat from Tabaristan.

==== The Abbasid revolution and Iranian Renaissance ====
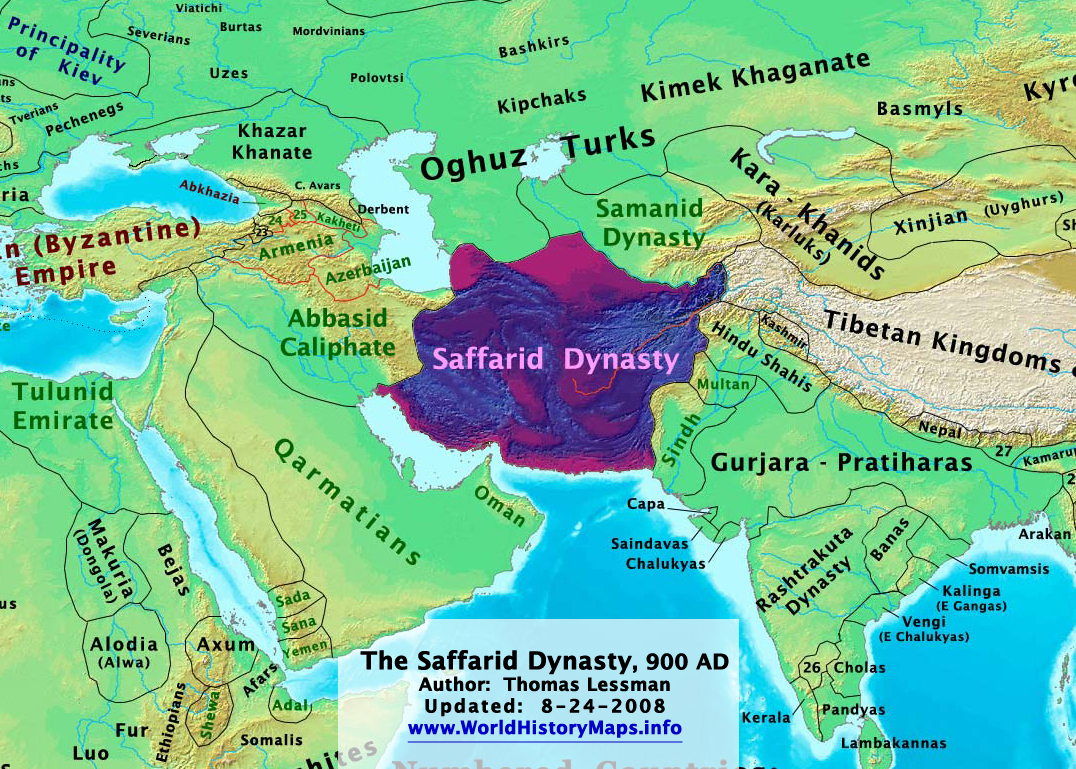
The Saffarid dynasty in 900 AD

A map of Iranian dynasties in the mid 10th-century

Anti-Umayyad insurrections were supported by non-Arab Islamic converts, who were resentful over being relegated to lower social standing. In 747–750, one of these insurrections grew into the Abbasid revolution, in which the Umayyads were replaced with the Abbasids, descendants of Muhammad's uncle, Abbas.

The political authority of the Abbasid caliphs diminished over the course of the 9th and 10th centuries. This led to the establishment of several independent Iranian dynasties, the ousting of Arab rulers from their scattered bastions across the country, and an Iranian cultural renaissance. The period between the collapse of Abbasid authority and the conquest of Iran by the Seljuk Turks in the 11th century is referred to as the "Iranian Intermezzo".

The Iranian Intermezzo saw the rise and fall of several major and minor dynasties. Among the most significant of these overlapping dynasties were the Tahirids in Khorasan (821–873); the Saffarids in Sistan (861–1003); and the Samanids (819–1005), originally at Bukhara. The Samanids eventually ruled an area from central Iran to Pakistan.

By the early 10th century, the Abbasids almost lost control to the growing Iranian faction known as the Buyid dynasty (934–1062). Since much of the Abbasid administration had been Persian, the Buyids were quietly able to assume real power in Baghdad. The Buyids were defeated in the mid-11th century by the Seljuk Turks, who continued to exert influence over the Abbasids. The Seljuks were eventually supplanted by the Khwarazmian Empire in 1194, a culturally Persianate empire of Turkic mamluk origin.

==== Islamization and Persianization ====
The Islamization of Iran was a long process. As Persian Muslims consolidated their rule, the Muslim population rose from approximately 40% in the mid-9th century to close to 90% by the end of the 11th century. Historian Seyyed Hossein Nasr suggests that the rapid increase in conversion was aided by the Persian nationality of the rulers. Although Persians adopted the religion of their conquerors, over the centuries they worked to protect and revive their distinctive language and culture, a process known as Persianization. Arabs and Turks participated in this process.

==== Mongol invasions ====
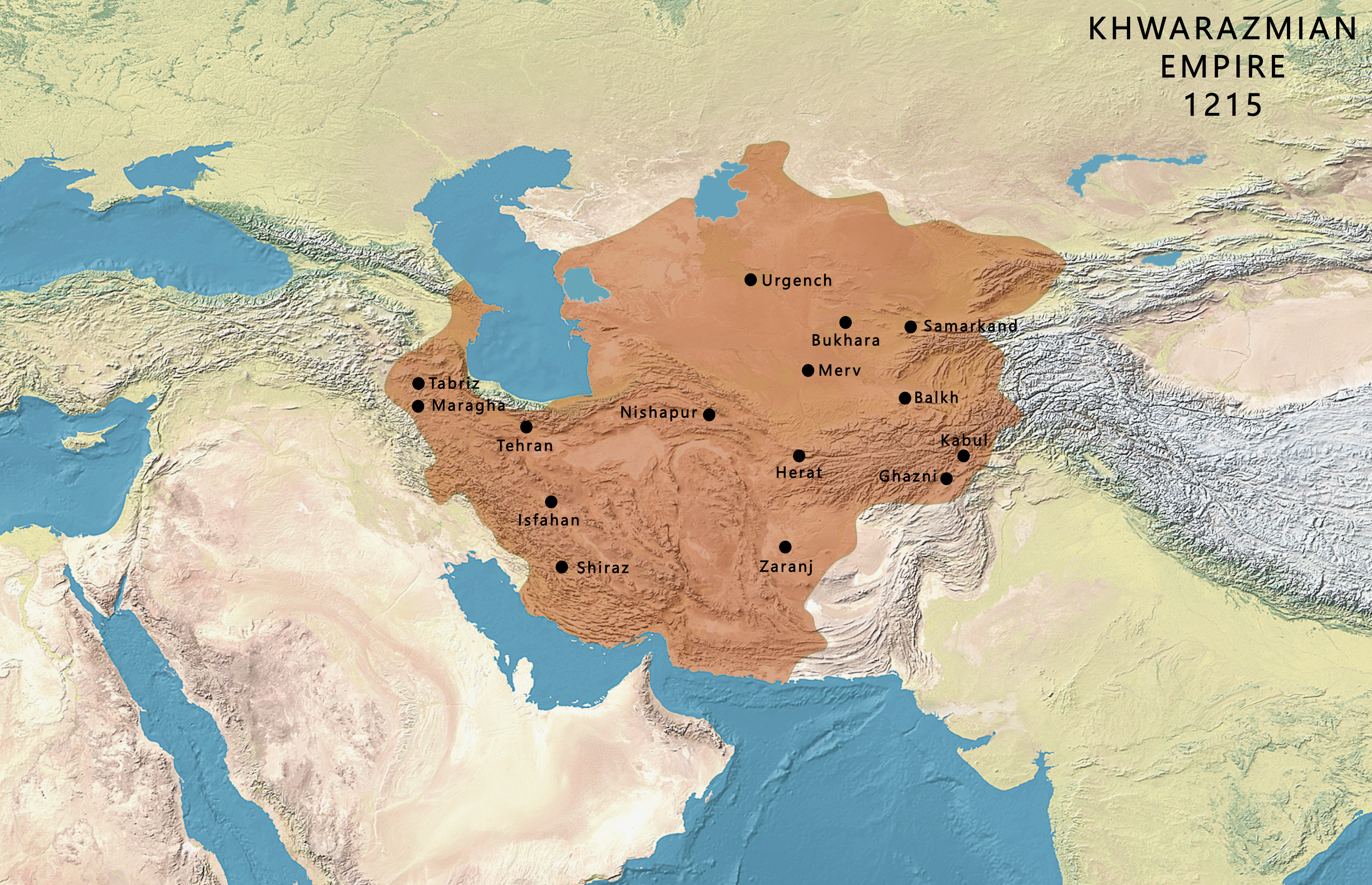
Territory of the Khwarazmian Empire on the eve of the Mongol conquests, c. 1215

In the early 13th century, the Mongols reached Iran. Bukhara was conquered in 1220 and the Khwarazmian Empire was destroyed. During 1220–21 Bukhara, Samarkand, Herat, Tus and Nishapur were razed, and the whole populations were slaughtered. Over the following decades, further conquests followed, culminating in the fall of Baghdad and end of the Abbasid Caliphate's rule in 1258.

After the death of Möngke Khan, the Mongol Empire was fractured by civil war, both over the succession of the next Great Khan and between nomadic traditionalists and the new settled princes of China and the Middle East. Kublai Khan was eventually universally recognized, but the empire was irreversibly fragmented. In much of the southwest of the empire, including Iran, power fell to Hulegu Khan, who had been made a deputy there under Möngke Khan. Hulegu was accepted as a legitimate ruler in Iran and was legitimized through a fatwa issued by the Shia scholar Ali ibn Tawus al-Hilli. Iran experienced a cultural renaissance under Ilkhanid rule. Ghazan Khan converted to Islam in the late 13th century, turning the state further away from the other Mongol realms.

After Ghazan's nephew Abu Said died in 1335, the Ilkhanate lapsed into civil war and was divided between several petty dynasties – most prominently the Jalayirids, Muzaffarids, Sarbadars and Kartids. The mid-14th-century Black Death killed about 30% of the country's population.

==== Timur and the rise of new powers ====
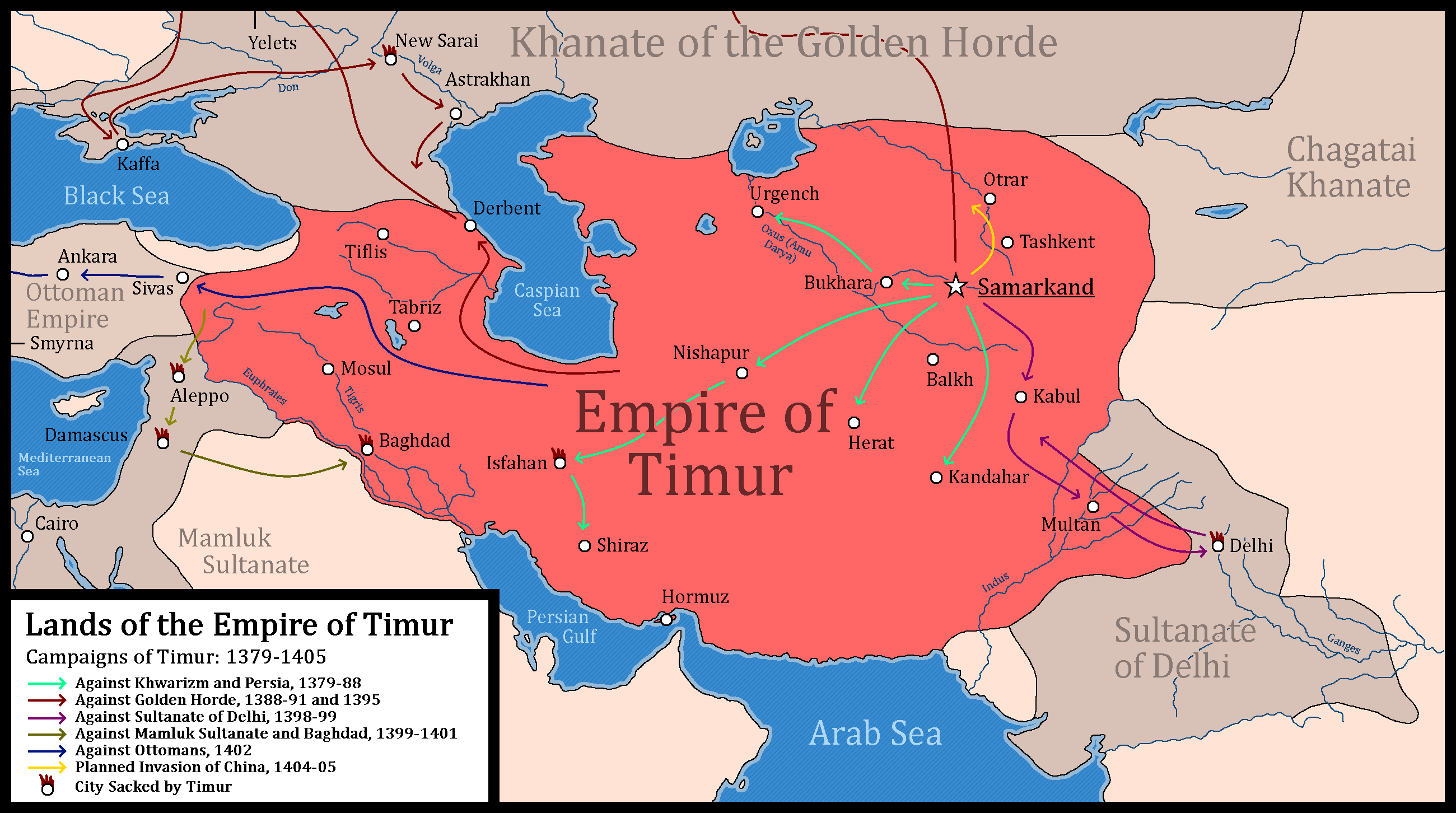
Timur's empire and his military campaigns

Iran remained divided until the establishment of the Persianate Timurid dynasty in 1370. Its founder, Timur (r. 1370–1405), hailed from a Turkified tribe of Mongols. After establishing a power base in Transoxiana, Timur invaded Iran in 1381 and eventually conquered most of it. Timur's campaigns were known for their brutality; many people were slaughtered and several cities were destroyed.

In 1387, Timur ordered the complete massacre of Isfahan, killing 70,000 people. The Timurids maintained control of most of Iran until 1452, when they lost the bulk of it to the Qara Qoyunlu, who were conquered by the Aq Qoyunlu in 1468. Uzun Hasan and his successors were the masters of Iran until the rise of the Safavids.

=== Early modern period ===
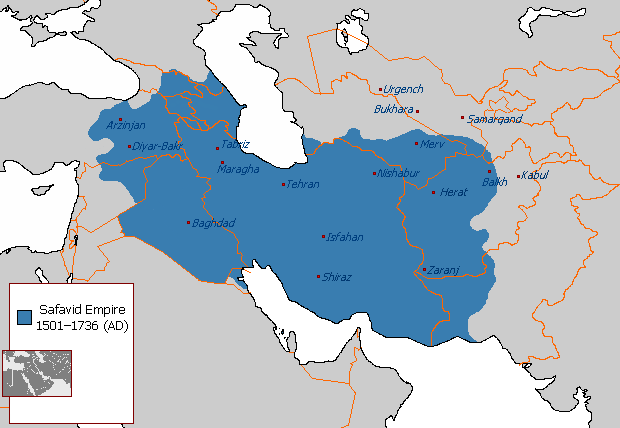
Safavid Iran (1501–1722) at its greatest extent

The Safavid Empire, founded by Ismail I (r. 1505–1524), is often considered the beginning of modern Iranian history. While Safavid Iran predated the concept of the nation-state as such, it established the basis for the modern state of Iran. The Safavid dynastic period was one of the most significant in Iranian history, as it reunified Iran as a cohesive entity under native rule and established Shia Islam as the official religion. The Safavids ruled from 1501 to 1722, and experienced a brief restoration from 1729 to 1736.

The Safavid state had a complex bureaucratic system of checks and balances, which ensured transparency and prevented fraud. This system was not intended to equalize power between branches of government, but to ensure total power of the shah. Legitimized by his bloodline as a sayyid, or descendant of Muhammad, the shah monitored the actions of government officials through reports provided by the superintendent of each department. Jean Chardin, French merchant and eventual ambassador to Iran, wrote that the Safavid shahs ruled their land with an iron fist and often in a despotic manner.

Complex rivalries in the region of Khorasan led to the Afghan Hotak dynasty invading Iran. In 1722, this conflict led to the collapse of the Safavid Empire after the siege of Isfahan. The brief interlude between 1722 and the rise of the Qajar dynasty in 1789–1796 was marked by widespread political turmoil in Iran and several rival attempts to establish power over the country. The Safavids failed to regain power and the Hotaks failed to establish control. The rival Afsharid and Zand dynasties were established by Nader Shah (r. 1736–1747) and Karim Khan (r. 1751–1779), respectively.

==== Nader Shah and the shifting balance of power ====
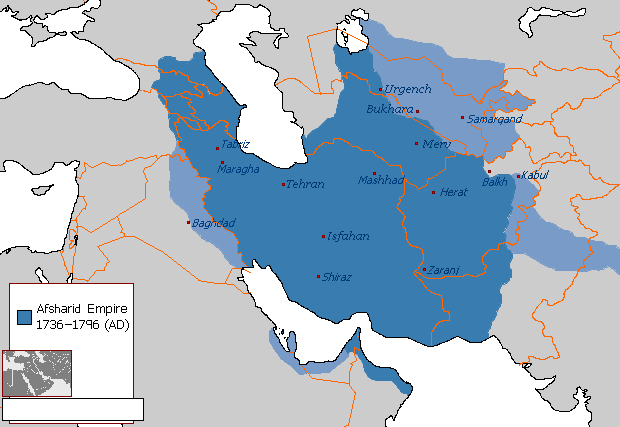
A map of the Afsharid Empire at its greatest extent, in 1741–1745

Nader Shah has been described as "the last great Asiatic military conqueror", and compared by some historians to Napoleon and Alexander the Great. His numerous campaigns created a great empire that, at its maximum extent, briefly encompassed all or part of modern-day Afghanistan, Armenia, Azerbaijan, Bahrain, Georgia, India, Iran, Iraq, Turkey, Turkmenistan, Oman, Pakistan, Uzbekistan, the North Caucasus, and the Persian Gulf. However, his military spending had a ruinous effect on the Iranian economy.

Nader Shah's death was followed by a period of anarchy in Iran as rival army commanders fought for power. Nader's own family, the Afsharids, lost all but a small domain in Khorasan. The Zand family seized control of much of Iran in the 1750s. The Zand rulers never proclaimed themselves to be shahs, but ruled as regents of Iran. They first staked their claim to power on behalf of the Safavid puppet Ismail III (r. 1750–1773) and then on behalf of the Iranian people.

==== Rise of the Qajar dynasty and foreign interference ====
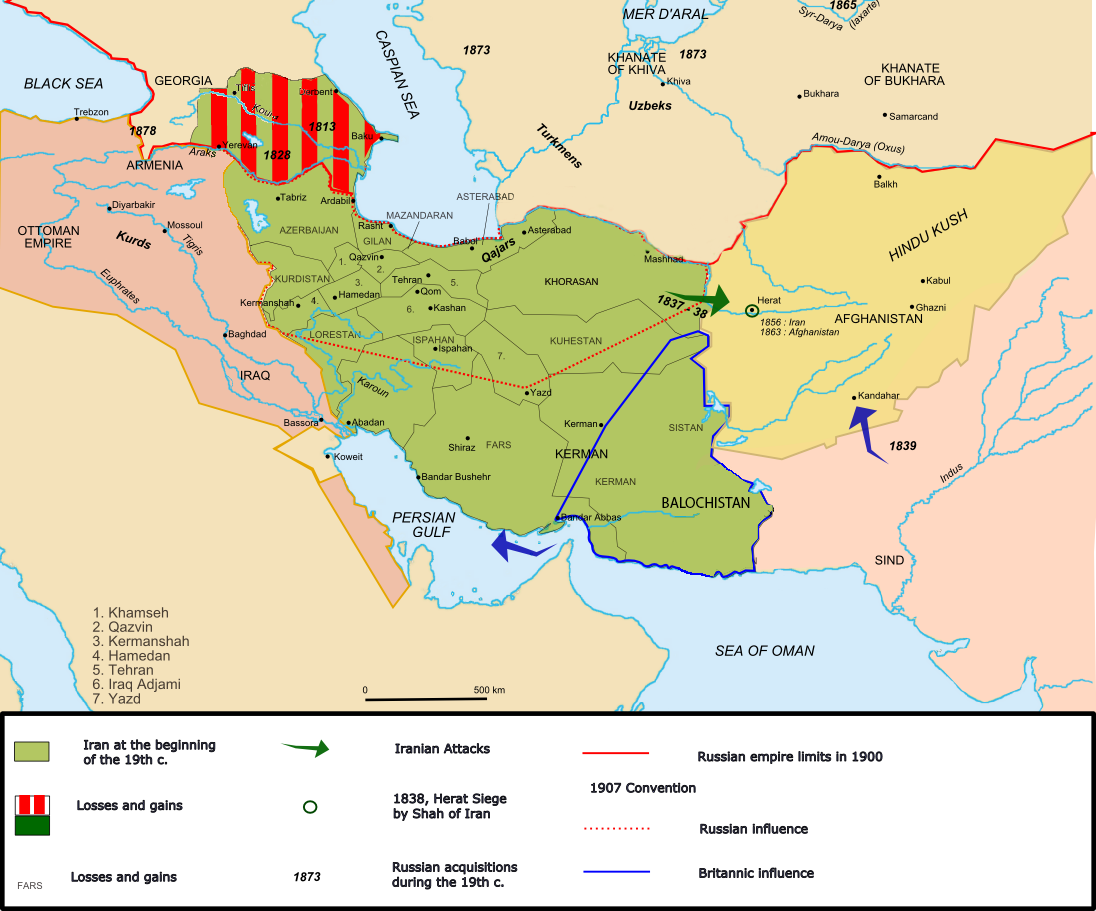
Iran under the Qajar dynasty in the 19th century.

The Qajar dynasty gradually increased in power as they clashed with the Afsharids and the Zands for control of the land, culminating in Agha Mohammad Shah proclaiming himself ruler in 1789. Agha Mohammad defeated the Zand dynasty in 1794 and was officially crowned in 1796. Shortly thereafter, he captured and deposed the Afsharid Shahrokh Shah, reunifying Iran under a single ruler.

In the 19th century, Iran lost significant territories in the Caucasus to the Russian Empire following the Russo-Persian Wars. Meanwhile, Britain became involved in southern Iran to counter Russia's presence in the north, which posed a threat to British India. Amid this struggle for power, drought, shifting agricultural priorities, and poor governance culminated in the Great Persian Famine of 1870–1871. While the death toll is unknown, the famine killed a significant portion of Iran's population; between several hundred thousand and four million Iranians are believed to have died as a result.

=== 20th century up to the Iranian Revolution ===
==== Constitutional Revolution and the rise of the Pahlavi dynasty ====
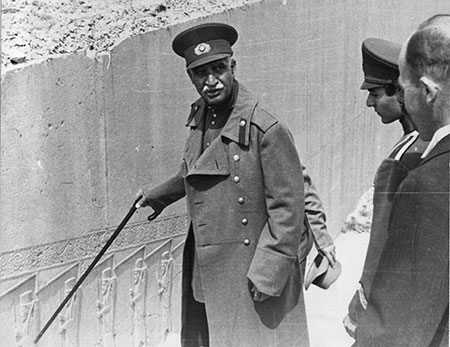
Reza Shah with then-Crown Prince Mohammad Reza Pahlavi at Persepolis, c. 1939

The Persian Constitutional Revolution between 1905 and 1911 led to the establishment of an Iranian parliament. After the 1921 coup d'état, the Qajar dynasty was replaced with the Pahlavi dynasty. The dynasty was founded by Reza Shah, who established an authoritarian government that valued nationalism, militarism, secularism and anti-communism combined with strict censorship and state propaganda. Reza Shah introduced many socio-economic reforms, reorganizing the army, government administration, and finances. Reza Shah ruled for almost 16 years until 1941, when he was forced to abdicate by the Anglo-Soviet invasion of Iran.

To his supporters, his reign brought "law and order, discipline, central authority, and modern amenities – schools, trains, buses, radios, cinemas, and telephones." However, his reign has been characterized as a corrupt police state which provided only surface level modernization.

==== World War II and post-occupation instability ====
Due in part to Nazi Germany's invasion of the Soviet Union, the Iranian government expected Germany to win the war and establish a powerful force on the Russian-Iranian border. Iran rejected British and Soviet demands to expel German residents from its borders. In response, the two Allies invaded in August 1941 and easily overwhelmed the weak Iranian army in Operation Countenance.

Iran became the major conduit of Allied Lend-Lease aid to the Soviet Union. The purpose was to secure Iranian oil fields and ensure Allied supply lines through the Persian Corridor. Iran remained officially neutral. Reza Shah was deposed during the subsequent occupation and replaced with his young son Mohammad Reza Pahlavi. At the 1943 Tehran Conference, the Allied "Big Three"—Joseph Stalin, Franklin D. Roosevelt, and Winston Churchill—issued the Tehran Declaration to guarantee the post-war independence and boundaries of Iran.

==== Mosaddegh and the Shah's rule ====
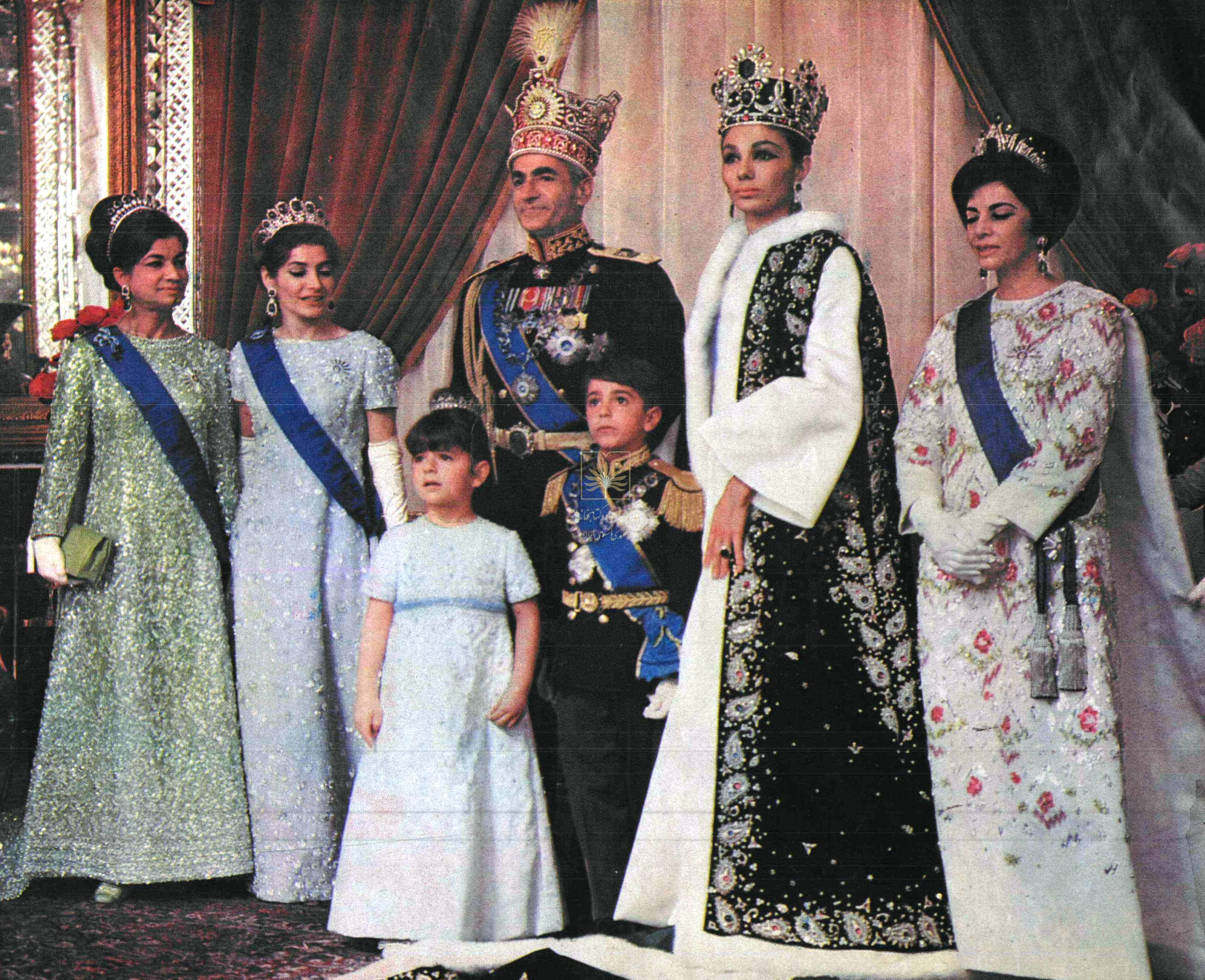
The coronation of Mohammad Reza Pahlavi, the last Iranian coronation, held in 1967

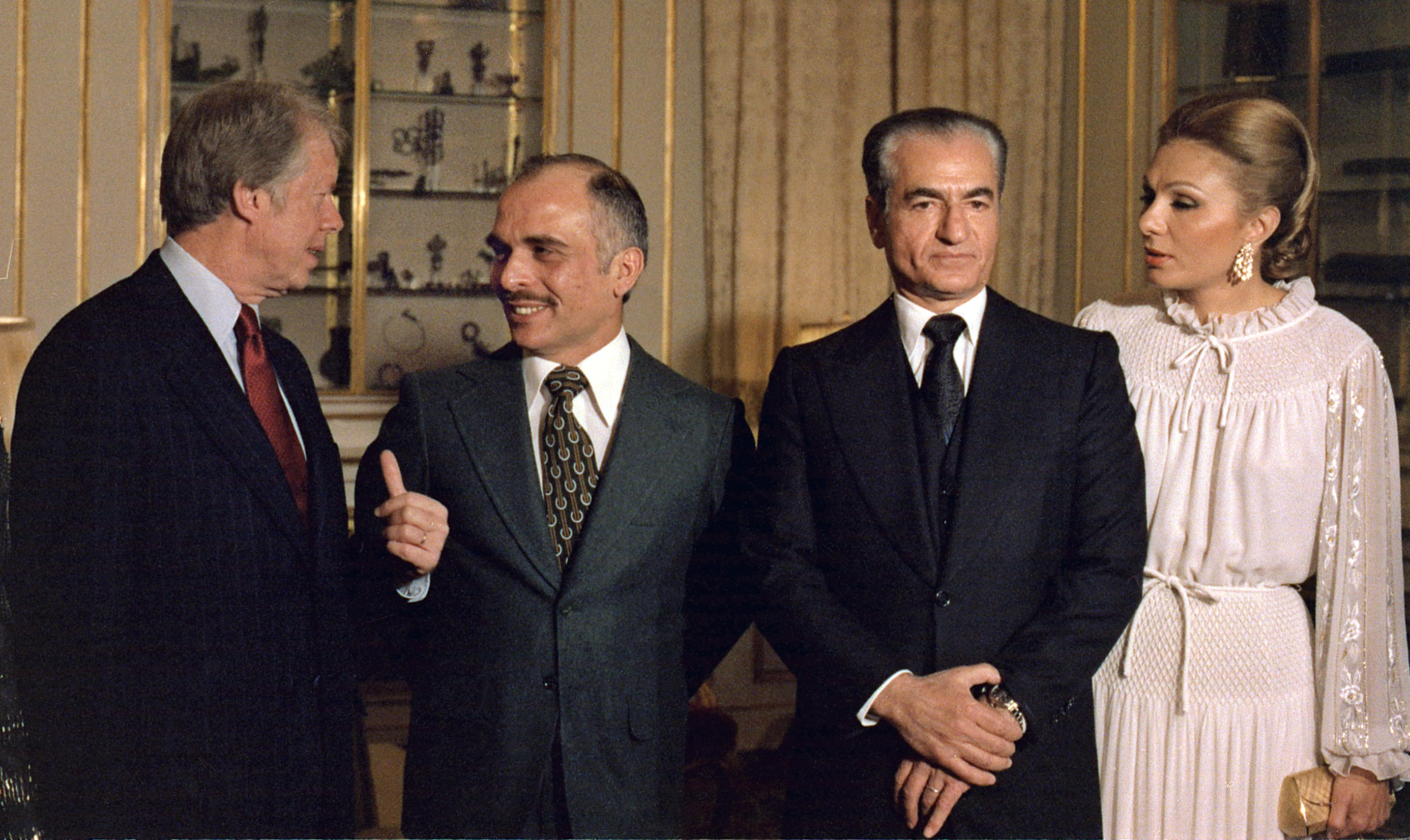
Mohammad Reza Shah and Shahbanu Farah Pahlavi of Iran with US President Jimmy Carter and King Hussein of Jordan in 1977

In 1951, under Prime Minister Mohammad Mosaddegh, the Iranian parliament voted to nationalize the British-owned oil industry, leading to the Abadan Crisis. Despite British pressure, including an economic blockade, nationalization continued. Mosaddegh was removed from power in 1952 but was quickly re-appointed by the Shah, due to a popular uprising in support of the premier. He forced the Shah into a brief exile in August 1953 after a failed military coup by Imperial Guard Colonel Nematollah Nassiri.

On 19 August, a successful coup was headed by retired army general Fazlollah Zahedi, aided by the US (CIA) and the British (MI6), known as Operation Ajax and Operation Boot to the respective agencies. The coup—with a black propaganda campaign against Mosaddegh—forced Mosaddegh from office. Mosaddegh was arrested and tried for treason. Found guilty, Mosaddegh had his sentence reduced to house arrest on his family estate while his foreign minister, Hossein Fatemi, was executed. Zahedi succeeded him as prime minister and suppressed opposition to the Shah, specifically from the National Front and the communist Tudeh Party.

From that time until the revolution, Iran was ruled as an autocracy under the Shah, with strong American support. Iran initiated economic, social, agrarian, and administrative reforms to modernize the country, which became known as the White Revolution. Many Islamic leaders criticized these initiatives, and the land reform had mixed results. By 1978, the Shah had become wildly unpopular among the Iranian people. Daily demonstrations destabilized the region, and the Shah established martial law to curb opposition. When hundreds of thousands of protestors persisted, security forces opened fire on the crowds in an incident that became known as Black Friday.

=== Islamic Revolution ===
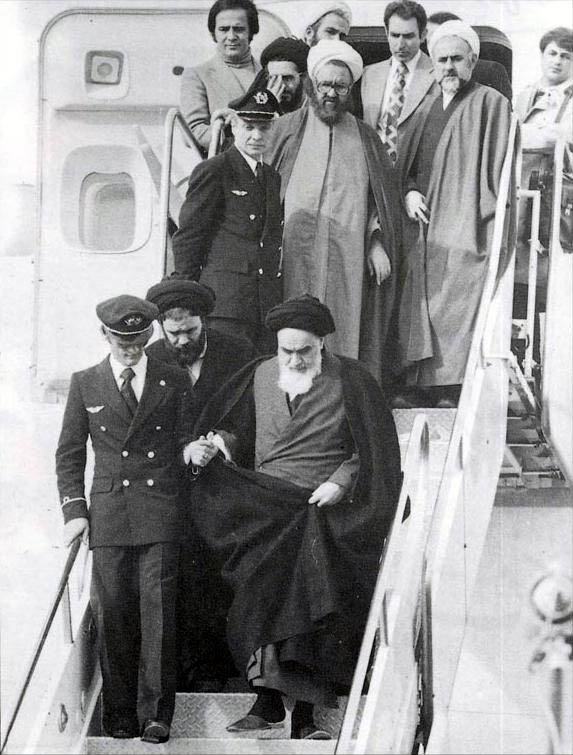
Ruhollah Khomeini returns to Iran after 14 years of exile in Turkey, Iraq and France on 1 February 1979.

The protests against the Shah grew to include more than 10% of the country; it is rare for revolutions to involve even 1% of a country's population. Frustration with the Shah was so great that even secular and leftist groups supported Ayatollah Ruhollah Khomeini, the leader of the revolution, despite sharing none of his political positions. Under increasing pressure, the Shah eventually fled Iran, charging the interim Regency Council with his duties until a new government was formed. Shapour Bakhtiar, the head of the council, invited Khomeini to return from exile. However, upon return, Khomeini pledged to defeat the interim government led by Bakhtiar and claimed to support free democratic elections. Violence broke out between the two factions, ultimately leading Bakhtiar to flee Iran in disguise.

On 31 March 1979, a referendum was held on whether to transition from a government of monarchy to an Islamic republic. The referendum was approved by a massive margin of 99.31%. It mandated the creation of an assembly to draft the new theocratic constitution, whereby Khomeini became Supreme Leader in December 1979. Iran's modernizing, capitalist economy was replaced by populist Islamic economic and cultural policies. Industries were nationalized, laws and schools Islamized, and Western influence restricted.

==== Khomeini era, Iran–Iraq War, and leadership transition ====
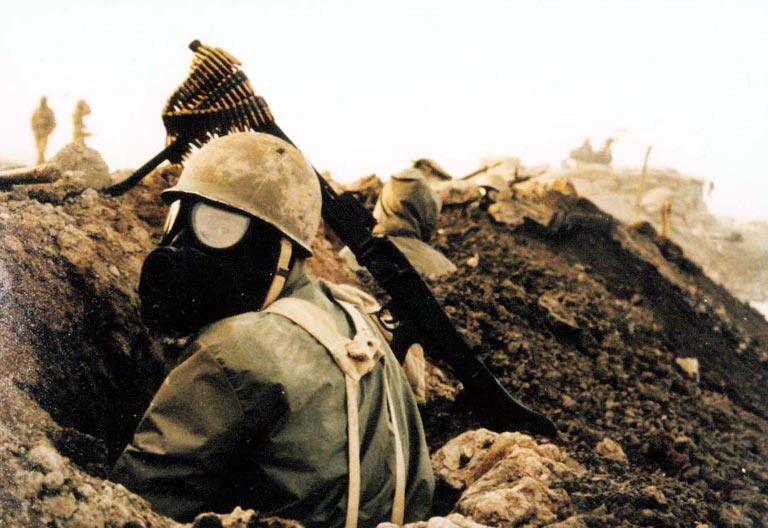
An Iranian soldier with gas mask during the Iran–Iraq War

The shah, now out of power, went to the US to seek cancer treatment after other countries denied him entry. Supporters of the revolution feared that this was a step toward a coup to reinstate the Shah's reign. On 4 November 1979, Iranian students seized US embassy personnel, labeling the embassy a "den of spies". 52 hostages were held for 444 days until January 1981. During the Cultural Revolution in Iran from 1980 to 1983, opposition to Islamic values was purged including through the 1981–1982 Iran massacres.

Iraqi leader Saddam Hussein attempted to take advantage of the disorder of the revolution, the weakness of the Iranian military and the revolution's antagonism against Western governments. On 22 September 1980, the Iraqi army invaded Iran at Khuzestan, precipitating the Iran–Iraq War. The attack took revolutionary Iran by surprise. Although Hussein's forces made early advances, Iranian forces pushed the Iraqi army back into Iraq by 1982.

Khomeini sought to export the revolution westward into Iraq, especially to Iraq's Shi'a Arab majority. The war continued until 1988, when Khomeini "drank the cup of poison" and accepted a truce mediated by the UN. The war, which ended in a stalemate in 1988, killed approximately 500,000 people. During the war, Saddam extensively used chemical weapons against Iranians.

==== Khamenei era ====
On his deathbed in 1989, Khomeini appointed a 25-man Constitutional Reform Council, which named Ali Khamenei as the next Supreme Leader, and made changes to Iran's constitution. While Khamenei lacked Khomeini's "charisma and clerical standing", he developed a network of supporters within the armed forces and its economically powerful religious foundations.

President Akbar Rafsanjani concentrated on a pro-business policy of rebuilding the economy, without breaking with the ideology of the revolution. He supported a free market, favoring privatization of state industries and a moderate position internationally. In 1997, Rafsanjani was succeeded by moderate reformist Mohammad Khatami, whose government advocated freedom of expression, constructive diplomatic relations with Asia and the EU, and policy that supported a free market and foreign investment.

The 2005 presidential election brought conservative populist and nationalist candidate Mahmoud Ahmadinejad to power. He was known for his hardline views, nuclearization, and hostility towards Israel, Saudi Arabia, the UK, US and other states. He was the first president to be summoned by the parliament to answer questions regarding his presidency. In 2013, centrist and reformist Hassan Rouhani was elected president. He encouraged personal freedom, access to information, and improved women's rights. He improved diplomatic relations through exchanging conciliatory letters.

In 2015, the Joint Comprehensive Plan of Action was reached in Vienna, between Iran, the P5+1 (UN Security Council + Germany) and the EU. The negotiations centered around ending the economic sanctions in exchange for Iran's restriction in producing enriched uranium. In 2018, the US under President Donald Trump withdrew from the deal and new sanctions were imposed. This nulled the economic provisions and brought Iran to nuclear threshold status.

In 2020, IRGC general Qasem Soleimani, the 2nd-most powerful person in Iran, was assassinated by the US, heightening tensions between them. Iran retaliated against US airbases in Iraq, the largest ballistic missile attack ever on Americans; 110 sustained brain injuries. On 8 January, Iran's Islamic Revolutionary Guard Corps shot down Ukraine International Airlines Flight 752, killing 176 civilians and leading to nation-wide protests. An international investigation led to the government admitting to the shootdown by a surface-to-air missile.

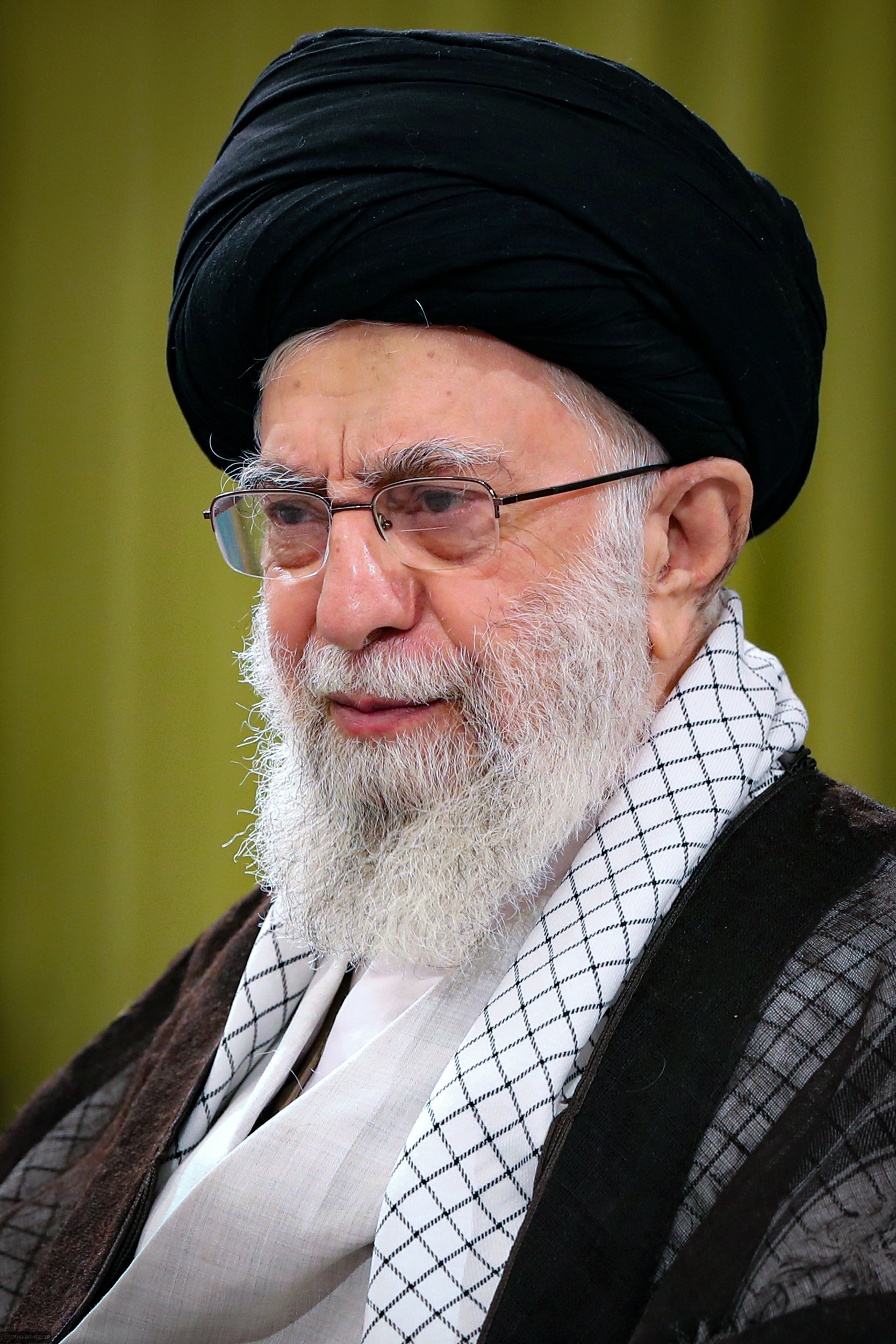
Khamenei in 2022

Hardliner Ebrahim Raisi lost a presidential bid in 2017, but ran again in 2021, succeeding Rouhani. During Raisi's term, Iran intensified uranium enrichment, hindered international inspections, joined SCO and BRICS, supported the 2022 Russian invasion of Ukraine and restored relations with Saudi Arabia. In April 2024, an Israeli airstrike on the Iranian consulate in Damascus killed an IRGC commander. Iran retaliated with UAVs, cruise and ballistic missiles; 9 hit Israel. It was the largest drone strike in history, biggest missile attack in Iranian history, its first ever direct attack on Israel and the first time since 1991 that Israel was directly attacked by a state.

In May 2024, Raisi was killed in a helicopter crash, and Iran held a presidential election, when reformist and former Minister of Health, Masoud Pezeshkian, was elected. In October, Iran launched 180 ballistic missiles at Israel in retaliation for assassinations of Ismail Haniyeh, Hassan Nasrallah and Abbas Nilforoushan. Israel struck Iranian military sites. In May 2025, Iran's government ordered a mass deportation of an estimated four million Afghan migrants and refugees living in Iran.

The weakening of Iran's key allies and proxies since 2023 left Iran's government weakened and isolated. In early 2025, Iran was rapidly advancing its nuclear program. Analysts warned such activity exceeded any plausible civilian justification. Iran and the United States entered negotiations for a new nuclear agreement, but progress stalled. In June, IAEA found Iran non-compliant with its nuclear obligations; in response, Iran announced activation of a new enrichment facility.

On 13 June 2025, Israel launched strikes across Iran, targeting nuclear facilities and killing top members of Iran's military leadership. Iran retaliated with missile strikes, and hostilities resulted in direct conflict between them. On 22 June, the United States struck the Iranian nuclear facilities. Iran then attacked US bases in Qatar, having given the US and Qatar advance notice hours before the strikes. Qatar said its air defences successfully intercepted the missiles, and no casualties were reported.

On 24 June, Israel and Iran agreed to a ceasefire after insistence from the US.

Since December 2025, Iran has had mass demonstrations across cities calling for the overthrow of the Islamic Republic, sparked by frustration over the economic crisis. As of 13 January 2026, Iran International estimated that at least 12,000 protesters had been killed amidst the internet blackout, as government security forces escalated their use of lethal force against demonstrators. As of 17 January 2026, estimates suggested that at least 16,500 people had been killed and approximately 330,000 injured in the 2026 Iran massacres.

On 28 February 2026, the United States and Israel conducted coordinated military strikes against multiple targets in the Islamic Republic of Iran, marking a significant escalation in long-standing tensions between Tehran and the U.S.–Israel alliance. That same day, Ali Khamenei was assassinated as part of a series of Israeli airstrikes aimed at high-ranking Iranian officials. Khamenei's death was confirmed by the Iranian government on 1 March. On 8 March, the 88-person Assembly of Experts announced that Mojtaba Khamenei, son of Ali Khamenei, was elected Supreme Leader in a "unanimous vote".

== Geography ==
The Topography of Iran

Iran has an area of 1,648,195 km^{2} (636,372 mi^{2}), making it is the sixth-largest country entirely in Asia and the second-largest in West Asia. It lies between latitudes 24° and 40° N and longitudes 44° and 64° E. It is bordered to the northwest by Armenia, the Azeri exclave of Nakhchivan, and the Republic of Azerbaijan; to the north by the Caspian Sea; to the northeast by Turkmenistan; to the east by Afghanistan and Pakistan; to the south by the Persian Gulf and the Gulf of Oman; and to the west by Iraq and Turkey.

Iran is in a seismically active area. On average, an earthquake of magnitude 7.0 or higher occurs once every ten years. Most earthquakes are shallow-focus and can be very devastating, such as the 2003 Bam earthquake. Iran consists mostly of the Iranian Plateau, with its southwestern region on the Arabian plate.

Iran is one of the world's most mountainous countries; its landscape is dominated by rugged mountain ranges that separate basins or plateaus. The populous western Iran is the most mountainous, with ranges such as the Caucasus, Zagros, and Alborz. Mount Damavand is the highest point, at 5,610 m (18,406 ft), which is the highest volcano in Asia. Iran's mountains have impacted its politics and economics for centuries.

Northern Iran is covered by the lush lowland Caspian Hyrcanian forests, near the southern shores of the Caspian Sea. The east consists mostly of desert basins, such as the Kavir Desert, which is the country's largest desert, and the Lut Desert, as well as salt lakes. The Lut Desert features the highest recorded land skin temperature in the world with 70.7 °C recorded in 2005. Large plains are found along the coast of the Caspian and at the north end of the Persian Gulf, where Iran borders the mouth of the Arvand river. Smaller, discontinuous plains are found along the remaining coast of the Persian Gulf, Strait of Hormuz, and Gulf of Oman.

=== Climate ===
A Köppen climate classification map of Iran

Iran's climate is diverse, ranging from arid and semi-arid to subtropical along the Caspian coast and northern forests. On the north edge of Iran, temperatures rarely fall below freezing and the area remains humid. Summer temperatures rarely exceed 29 °C (84.2 °F). Annual precipitation is 680 mm (26.8 in) in the eastern plains and more than 1,700 mm (66.9 in) in the west. The UN Resident Coordinator for Iran has said that "water scarcity poses the most severe human security challenge in Iran today."

To the west, settlements in the Zagros basin have lower temperatures and severe winters, with freezing average daily temperatures and heavy snowfall. The east and central basins are arid, with less than 200 mm (7.9 in) of rain and have occasional deserts. Average summer temperatures may reach 38 °C (100.4 °F). The southern coastal plains of the Persian Gulf and Gulf of Oman have mild winters, and very humid and hot summers. The annual precipitation ranges from 135 to 355 mm (5.3 to 14.0 in).

=== Biodiversity ===
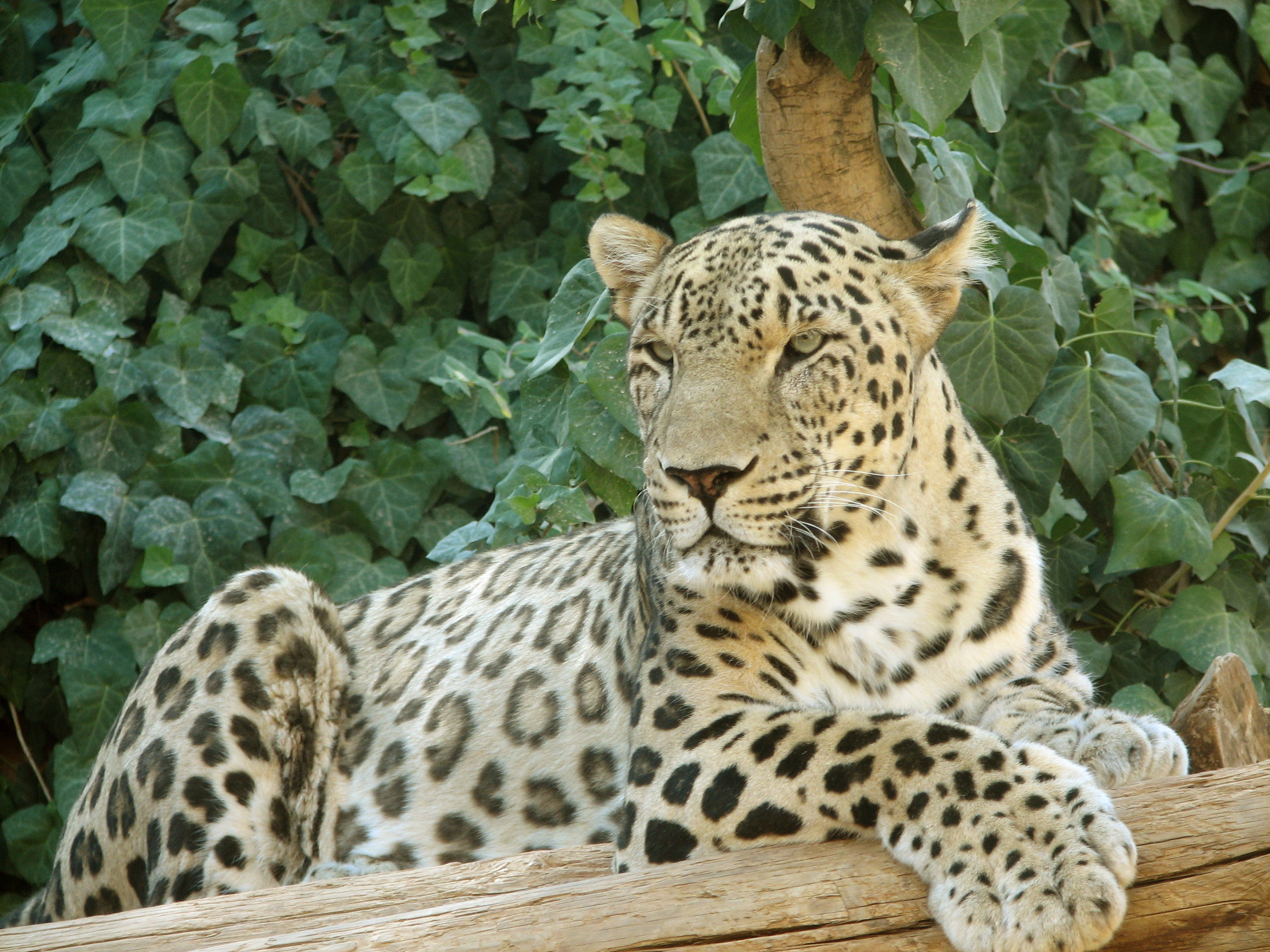
A Persian leopard, native to the Iranian Plateau

Nearly 60% of Iran is mountainous, and less than 10% is forested. About 120 million hectares of forests and fields are government-owned for national exploitation. Iran's forests can be divided into five vegetation regions: the Hyrcanian region which forms the green belt of the north side of Iran; the Turan region, which are mainly scattered in the center of Iran; the Zagros region, which mainly contains oak forests in the west; the Persian Gulf region, which is scattered in the southern coastal belt; the Arasbarani region, which contains rare and unique species. More than 8,200 plant species are grown. There are over 200 protected areas to preserve biodiversity and wildlife, with over 30 being the national parks.

Iran's living fauna includes 34 bat species, Indian grey mongoose, small Indian mongoose, golden jackal, Indian wolf, foxes, striped hyena, leopard, Eurasian lynx, brown bear and Asian black bear. Ungulate species include wild boar, urial, Armenian mouflon, red deer, and goitered gazelle. The critically endangered Asiatic cheetah survives only in Iran. Iran lost all its Asiatic lions and the extinct Caspian tigers by the early 20th century. Domestic ungulates are represented by sheep, goat, cattle, horse, water buffalo, donkey and camel. Iran is home to more than 570 bird species, including the pheasant, partridge, stork, eagle, and falcon.

== Government and politics ==
=== Supreme Leader ===
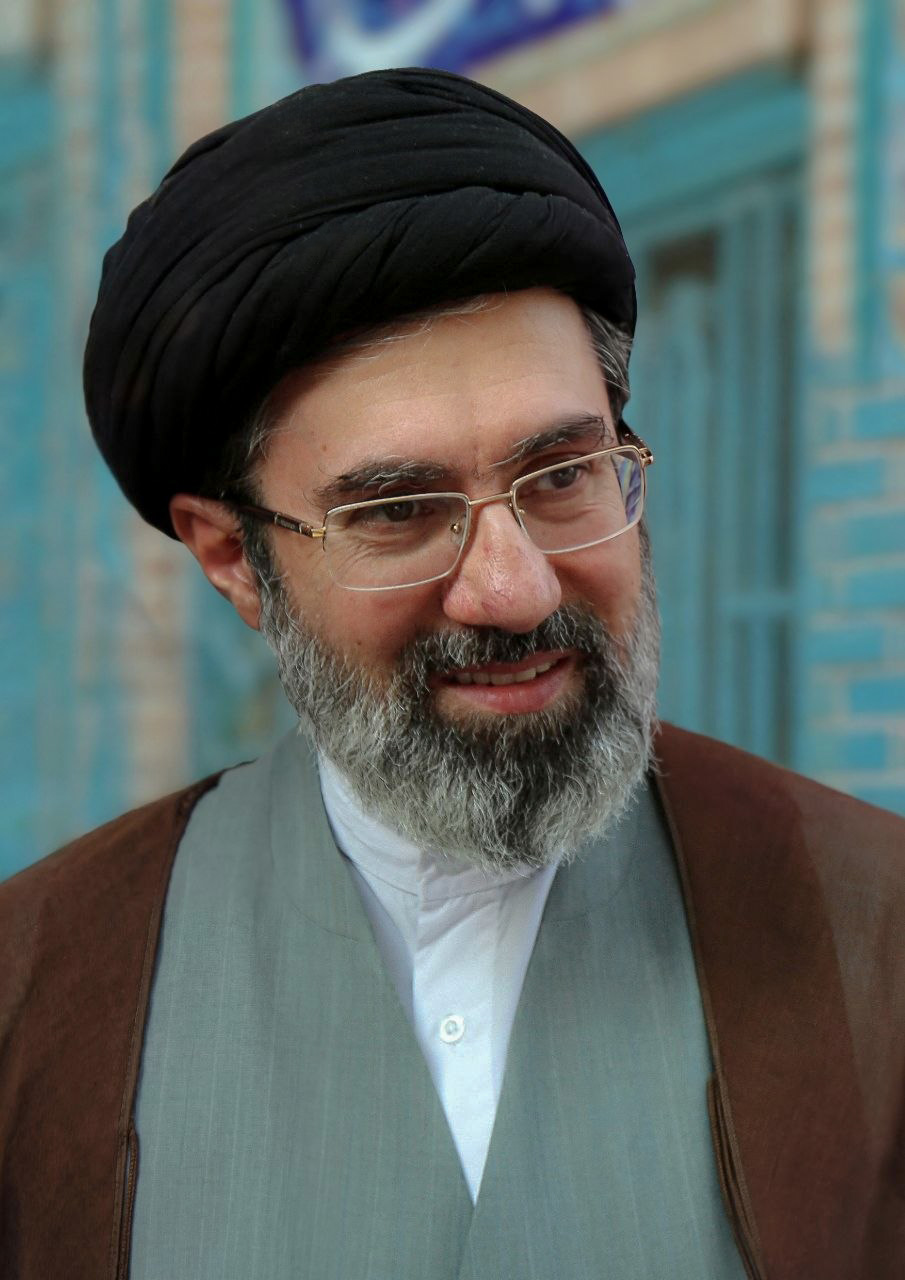
Mojtaba Khamenei
Supreme Leader

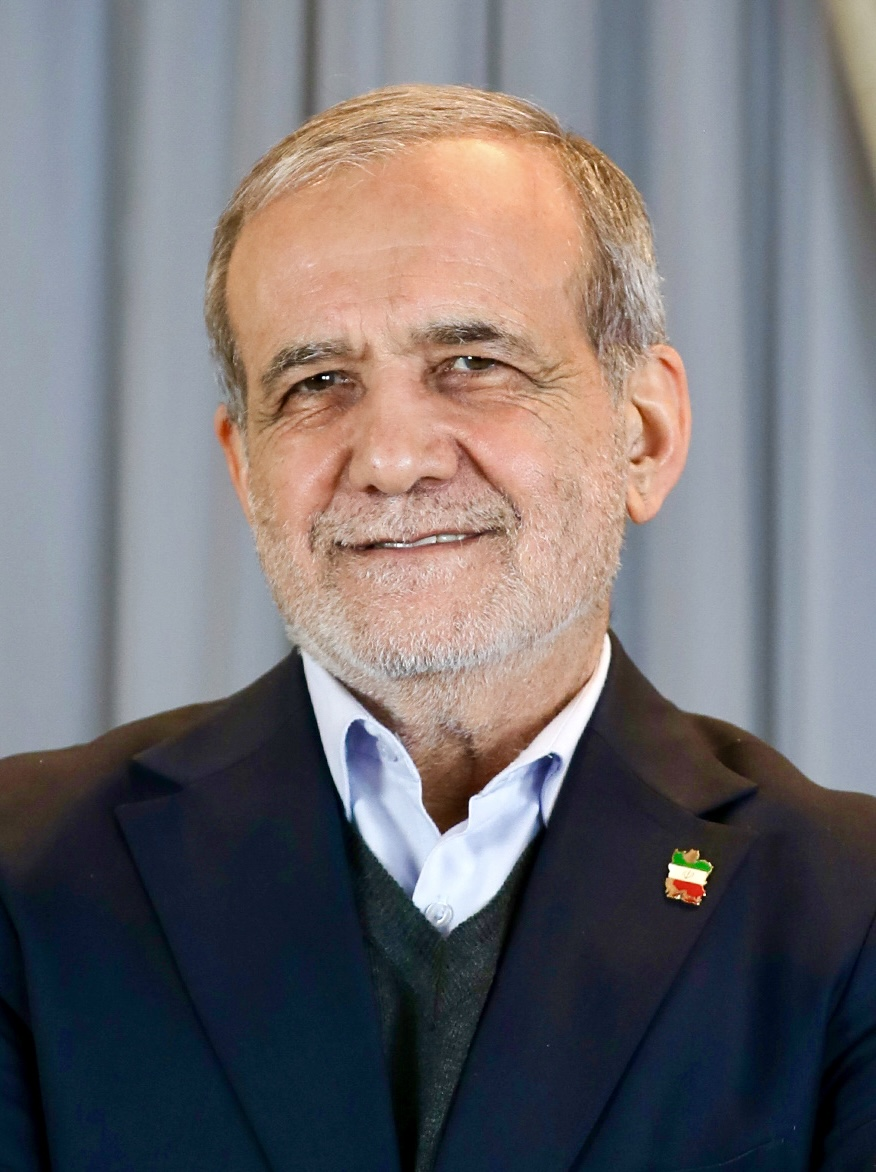
Masoud Pezeshkian
President

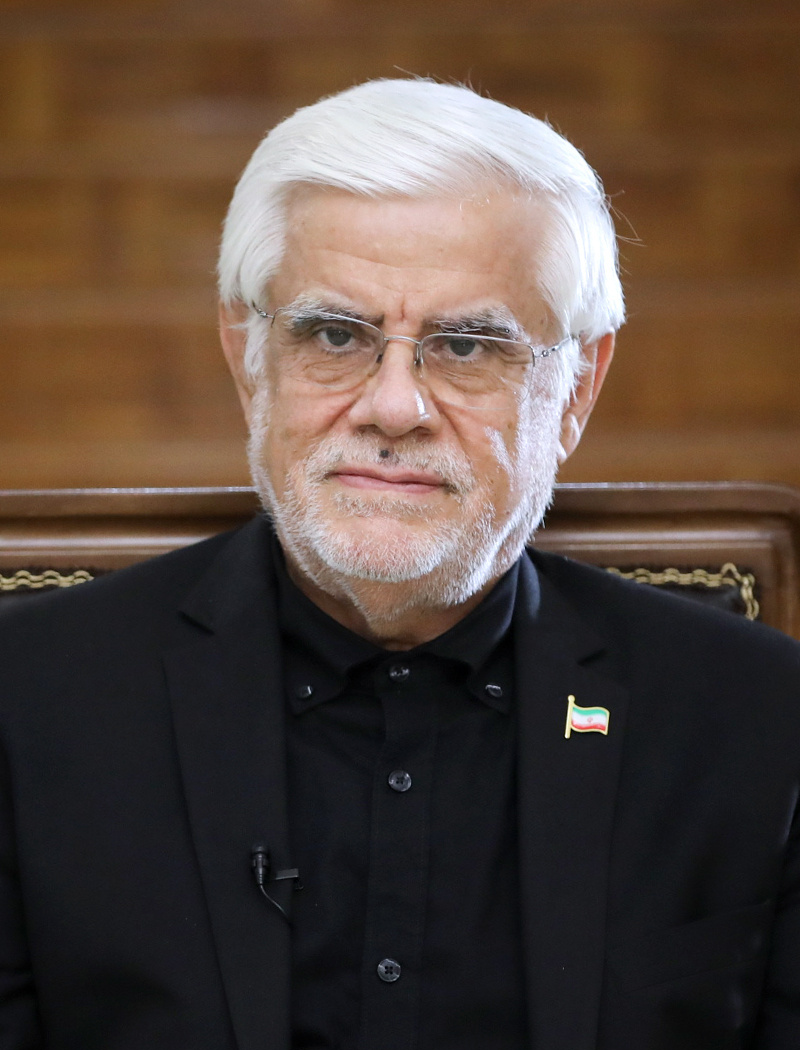
Mohammad Reza Aref
Vice President

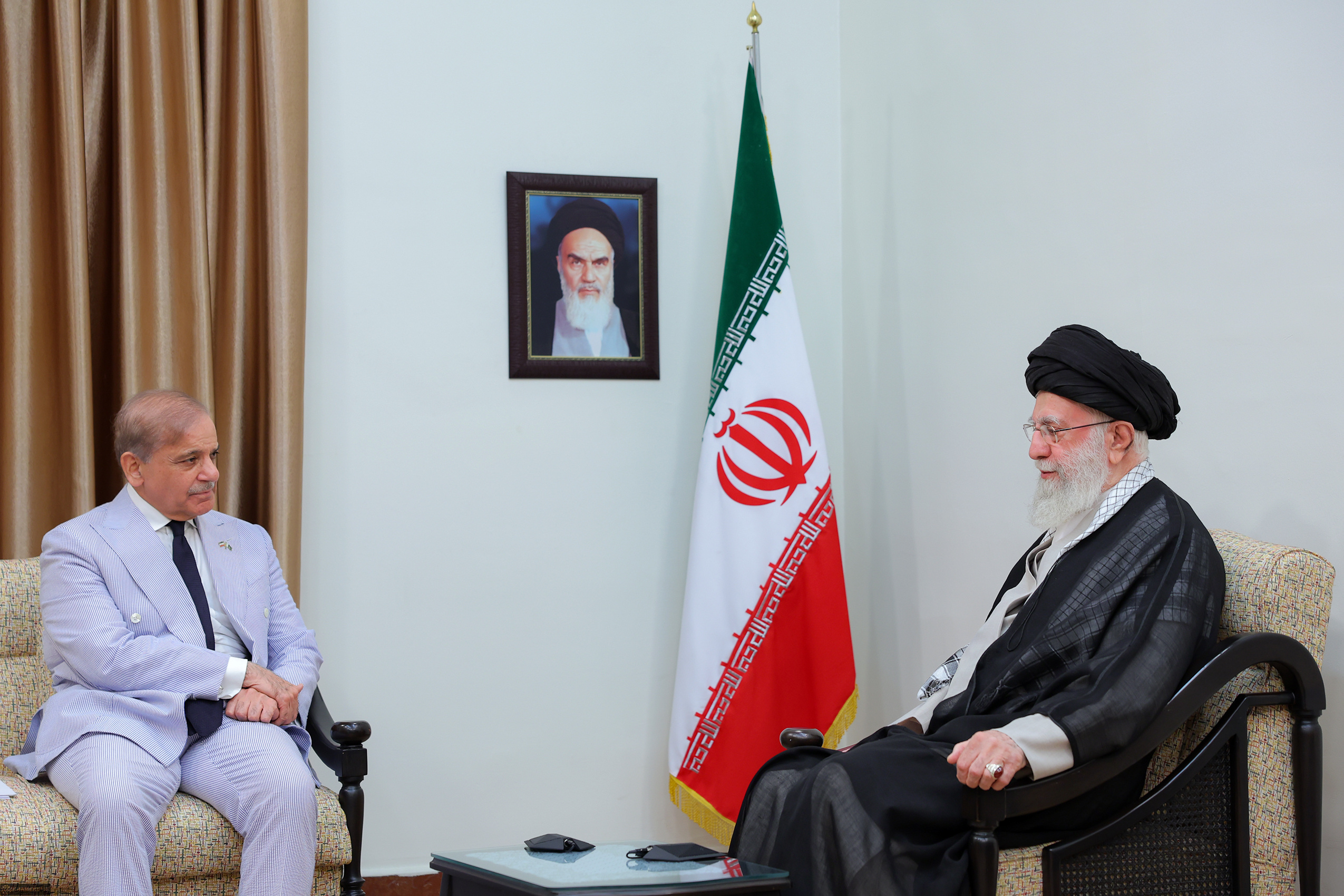
Supreme Leader Ayatollah Ali Khamenei with Pakistan's Prime Minister Shehbaz Sharif on 26 May 2025

The Supreme Leader, (Note: Persian: رهبر معظم, romanized: Rahbar-e Moazam) the Rahbar, the Leader of the Revolution or Supreme Leadership Authority, is the head of state and is responsible for supervision of policy. The president has limited power compared to the Rahbar. Key ministers are selected with the Rahbar's agreement, who has the ultimate say on foreign policy. The Rahbar is directly involved in ministerial appointments for defense, intelligence and foreign affairs, and other top ministries after submission of candidates from the president.

The Rahbar directly controls regional policy, with the Ministry of Foreign Affairs tasks limited to protocol and ceremonial occasions. Ambassadors to Arab countries, for example, are chosen by the Quds Force, which reports to the Rahbar. The Rahbar can order laws to be amended. The Setad, a state-owned enterprise under the Rahbar, was valued at $95 billion in 2013, accounts of which are secret even to the parliament.

The Rahbar is the commander-in-chief of the Armed Forces, (Note: "Appointing and dismissing the chief of the general staff, the commander-in-chief of the Islamic Revolution Guards Corps, and the commanders of the armed forces.") controls military intelligence and security operations, and has the sole power to declare war or peace. (Note: "Declaring war and peace, and the mobilization of the armed forces.") The Rahbar also appoints the heads of the judiciary, state radio and television networks, commanders of the police and military, and members of the Guardian Council.

The Assembly of Experts is responsible for electing the Rahbar and has the power to dismiss him on the basis of qualifications and popular esteem. To date, the Assembly of Experts has not challenged any of the Rahbar's decisions nor attempted to dismiss him. The previous head of the judicial system, Sadiq Larijani, appointed by the Rahbar, said that it is illegal for the Assembly of Experts to supervise the Rahbar. Many believe the Assembly of Experts has become a ceremonial body without any real power. In February 2025, The New York Times reported that according to Karim Sadjadpour, an expert on Iran at the Carnegie Endowment for International Peace, there exist in the Islamic Republic of Iran two parallel systems. One system is ruled by the military and intelligence forces, who report to the Rahbar, and "who oversee the nuclear programme and regional proxies and are tasked with repression, hostage taking and assassinations". The other system is ruled by diplomats and politicians, "who are authorized to speak to Western media and officials" and have minimal knowledge of Iran's nuclear programme.

The political system is based on the country's constitution. According to International IDEA's Global State of Democracy (GSoD) Indices and Democracy Tracker, Iran performs in the low range on overall democratic measures, with particular weaknesses in gender equality, freedom of association and assembly, and freedom of expression. Furthermore, Iran was ranked 158th in electoral democracy for year 2024 according to V-Dem Democracy Indices and was an electoral autocracy in the Regimes of the World classification. Juan José Linz wrote in 2000 that "the Iranian regime combines the ideological bent of totalitarianism with the limited pluralism of authoritarianism".

=== President ===
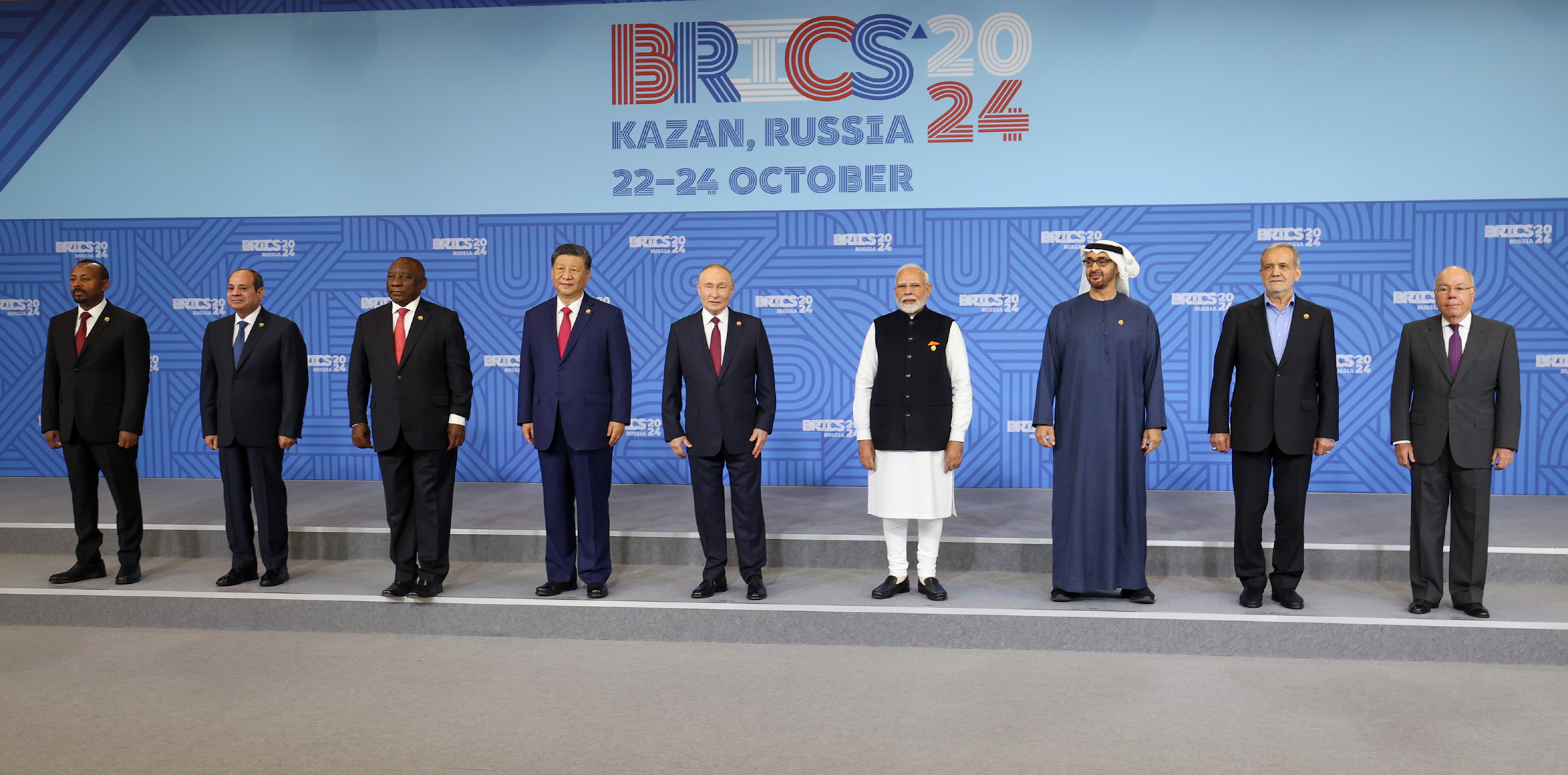
Iranian President Masoud Pezeshkian (second from the right) poses for a group photo with other heads of state during the 16th BRICS summit in Kazan, Russia, on 23 October 2024

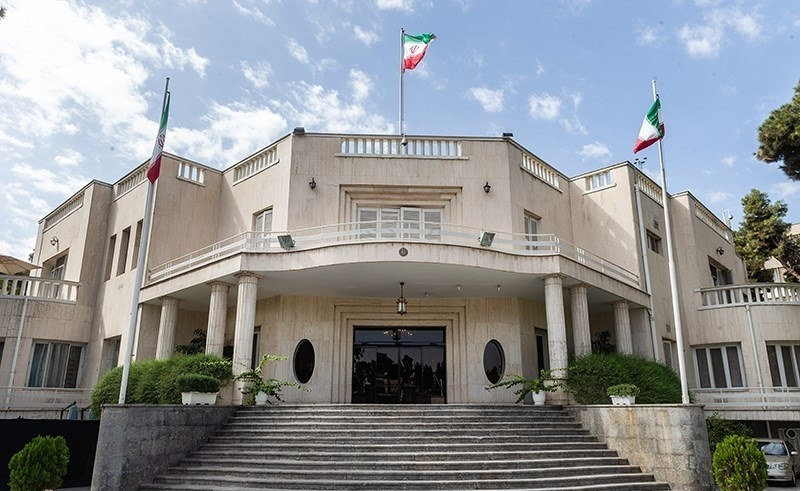
The entrance to the Presidential Administration palace in Pasteur Street, which is the cabinet's meeting place, and the President's office

The president is head of government and the second-highest-ranking authority after the Supreme Leader. The president is elected by universal suffrage for 4 years. Before elections, nominees to become a presidential candidate must be approved by the Guardian Council. The council's members are chosen by the Leader, with the Leader having the power to dismiss the president. The president can only be re-elected for one term. The president is the chairman of the Supreme National Security Council, and has the power to declare a state of emergency after passage by the parliament.

The president is responsible for the implementation of the constitution and for the exercise of executive powers in implementing the decrees and general policies as outlined by the Rahbar, except for matters directly related to the Rahbar, who has the final say. The president functions as the executive of affairs such as signing treaties and other international agreements, and administering national planning, budget, and state employment affairs, all as approved by the Rahbar. The president appoints ministers, subject to the approval of the Parliament and the Rahbar, who can dismiss or reinstate any minister. The president supervises the Council of Ministers, coordinates government decisions, and selects government policies to be placed before the legislature. Eight vice presidents serve under the president, as well as a cabinet of 22 ministers, all appointed by the president.

=== Guardian Council ===
Presidential and parliamentary candidates must be approved by the 12-member Guardian Council (all members of which are appointed by the Leader) or the Leader before running to ensure their allegiance. The Leader rarely does the vetting, but has the power to do so, in which case additional approval of the Guardian Council is not needed. The Leader can revert the decisions of the Guardian Council.

The constitution gives the council three mandates: veto power over legislation passed by the parliament, supervision of elections and approving or disqualifying candidates seeking to run in local, parliamentary, presidential, or Assembly of Experts elections. The council can nullify a law based on two accounts: being against sharia (Islamic law), or being against the constitution.

=== Supreme National Security Council ===
The Supreme National Security Council (SNSC) is at the top of the foreign policy decisions process. The council was formed during the 1989 Iranian constitutional referendum for the protection and support of national interests, the revolution, territorial integrity and national sovereignty. It is mandated by Article 176 of the Constitution to be presided over by the president.

The leader selects the secretary of the Supreme Council, and the council's decisions are effective after the leader confirms them. The SNSC formulates nuclear policy and would become effective if the Leader confirms them.

=== Legislature ===
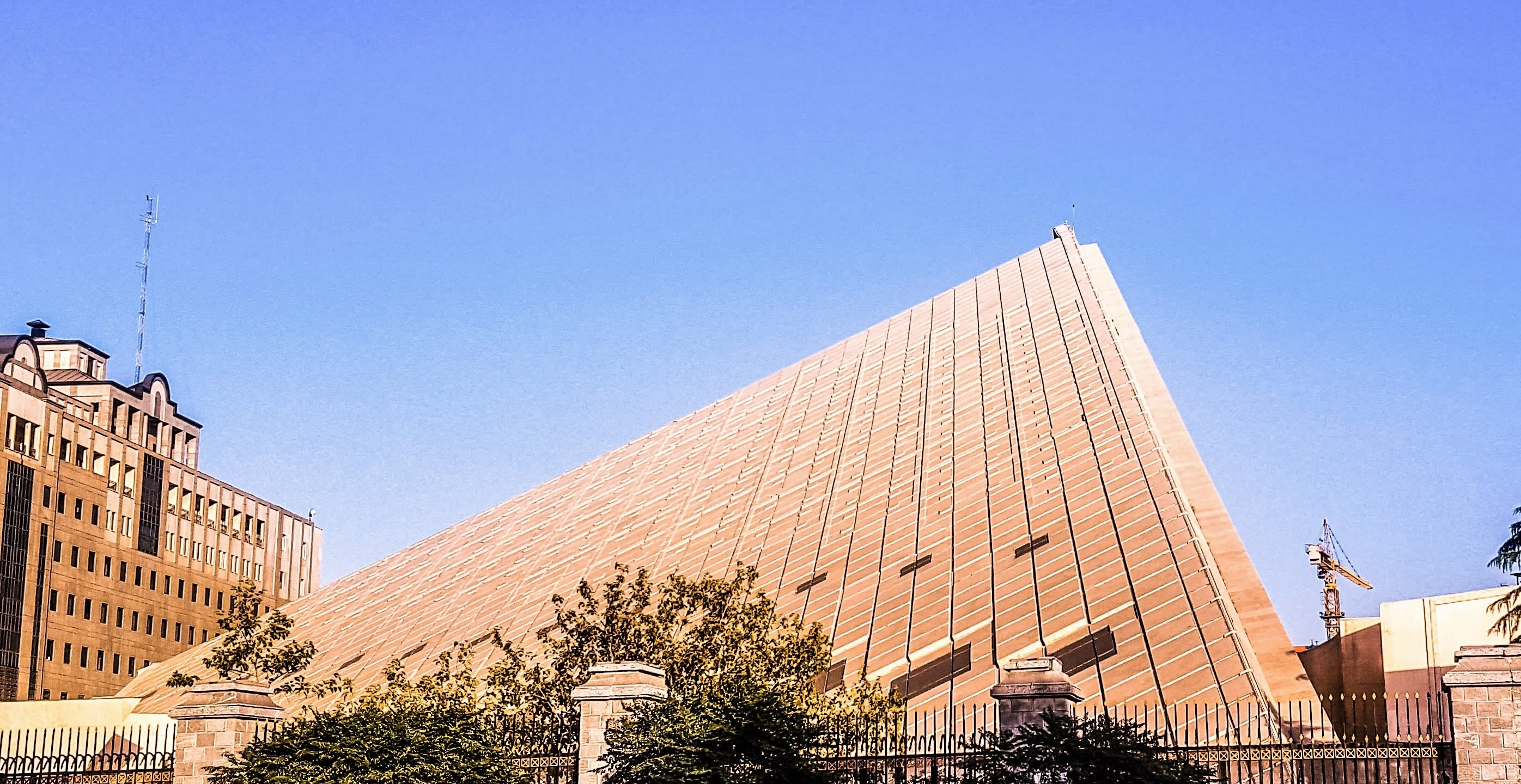
The building of the Islamic Consultative Assembly (ICA)

The legislature, known as the Islamic Consultative Assembly, Iranian Parliament or "Majles", is a unicameral body comprising 290 members elected for four years. It drafts legislation, ratifies international treaties, and approves the national budget. All parliamentary candidates and legislation from the assembly must be approved by the Guardian Council. The Guardian Council can dismiss elected members of the parliament. The parliament has no legal status without the Guardian Council, and the Council holds absolute veto power over legislation.

The Expediency Discernment Council has the authority to mediate disputes between Parliament and the Guardian Council. It serves as an advisory body to the Supreme Leader, making it one of Iran's most powerful governing bodies. The Parliament has 207 constituencies, including the 5 reserved seats for religious minorities. The remaining 202 are territorial, covering one or more of Iran's counties.

=== Law ===
Iran uses the sharia law (based on Ja'fari school) as its legal system, with elements of civil law. The Supreme Leader appoints the head of the Supreme Court and chief public prosecutor. There are several types of courts, including public courts that deal with civil and criminal cases, and revolutionary courts, which deal with certain offenses, such as crimes against national security. The decisions of the revolutionary courts are final and cannot be appealed.

The Chief Justice heads the judicial system and is responsible for its administration and supervision. He is the highest judge of the Supreme Court of Iran. The Chief Justice nominates candidates to serve as minister of justice, and the president selects one. The Chief Justice can serve for two five-year terms.

The Special Clerical Court handles crimes allegedly committed by clerics, although it has taken on cases involving laypeople. The Special Clerical Court functions independently of the regular judicial framework and is accountable only to the Supreme Leader. The Court's rulings are final and cannot be appealed. The Assembly of Experts, which meets for one week annually, comprises 86 "virtuous and learned" clerics elected by adult suffrage for 8-year terms.

=== Administrative divisions ===
Iran operates as a unitary state and is subdivided into thirty-one provinces (Persian: استان, ostân), each governed from a local center, usually the largest local city, which is called the capital (Persian: مرکز, markaz) of that province. The provincial authority is headed by a governor-general (استاندار, ostândâr), who is appointed by the Minister of the Interior subject to the approval of the cabinet.

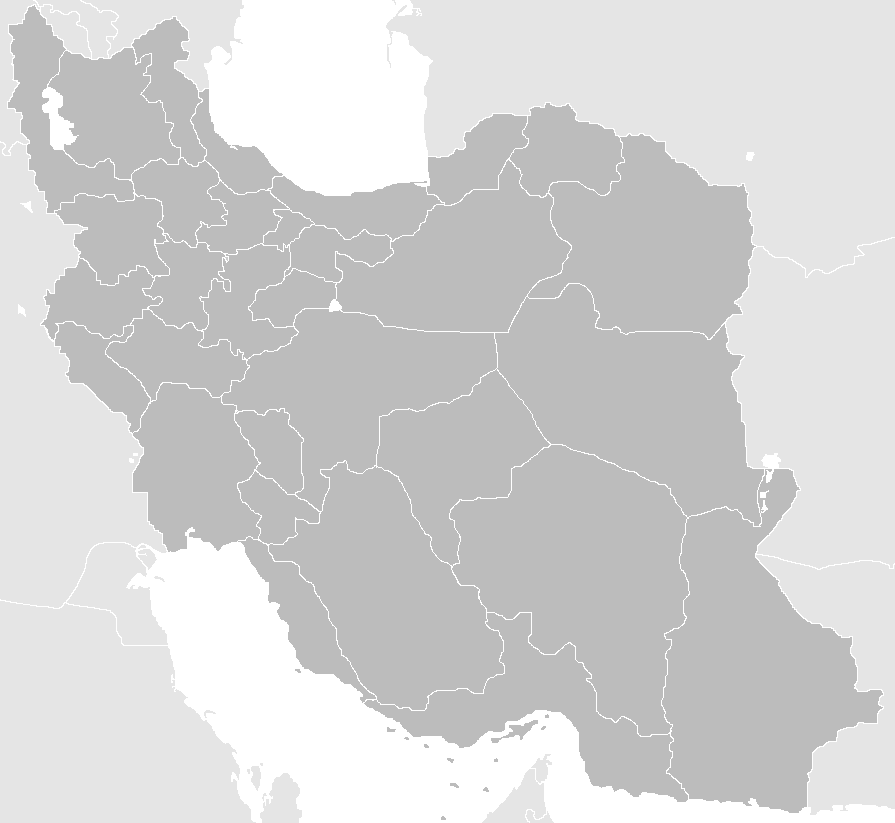
A map of Iran's provinces

=== Foreign relations ===
Nations with which Iran has diplomatic relations

Iran maintains diplomatic relations with 165 countries, but not the United States and Israel—a state which Iran derecognized in 1979. Iran has an adversarial relationship with Saudi Arabia due to different political ideologies. Iran and Turkey have been involved in modern proxy conflicts such as in Syria, Libya, and the South Caucasus. However, they have shared common interests, such as the issue of Kurdish separatism and the Qatar diplomatic crisis. Iran has a close and strong relationship with Tajikistan. Iran also has a strong relationship with Pakistan sharing common interests, such as the issue of Baloch separatism.

Iran formed the Axis of Resistance, a coalition of actors committed to countering the influence of the United States and Israel in the region. It most notably includes the Hezbollah in Lebanon, Islamic Resistance and Popular Mobilization Forces in Iraq, and the Houthi movement in Yemen. (Note: Officially the Ansar Allah, de facto government in Northwestern Yemen since 28 July 2016 under the Supreme Political Council) It sometimes includes Hamas (Note: Officially the Islamic Resistance Movement, de facto government of the Gaza Strip since 15 June 2007) and a variety of other Palestinian militant groups. Iran has deep economic relations and alliance with Iraq, Lebanon, and did with Syria, which was described as Iran's "closest ally". In December 2024, the fall of the Assad regime in Syria, a close ally of Iran, was a severe setback for the political influence of Iran in the region.

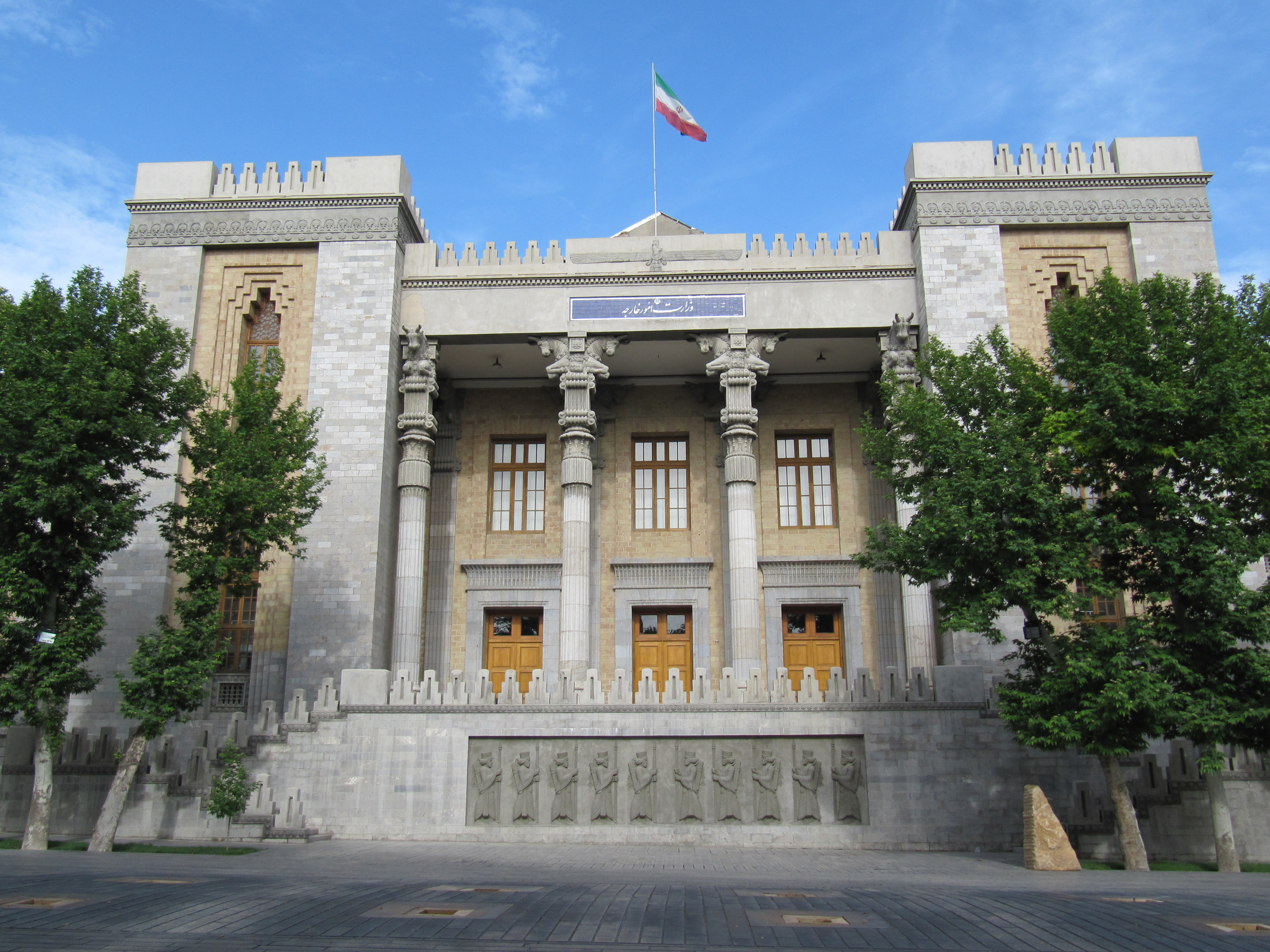
The building of the Ministry of Foreign Affairs, which extensively uses Achaemenid architecture in its facade, National Garden

Russia is a key trading partner, especially in regard to its excess oil reserves. Both share a close economic and military alliance and are subject to heavy sanctions by Western nations. Iran is the only country in Western Asia that has been invited to join the CSTO, the Russia-based international treaty organization that parallels NATO.

Relations between Iran and China are strong economically; they have developed a friendly, economic and strategic relationship. In 2021, Iran and China signed a 25-year cooperation agreement that will strengthen the relations between the two countries and would include "political, strategic and economic" components. Iran-China relations dates back to at least 200 BC and possibly earlier. Iran is one of the few countries in the world that has a good relationship with both North and South Korea. Iran is a member of dozens of international organizations, including the G-15, G-24, G-77, IAEA, IBRD, IDA, NAM, IDB, IFC, ILO, IMF, IMO, Interpol, OIC, OPEC, WHO, and the UN, and currently has observer status at the WTO.

=== Military ===
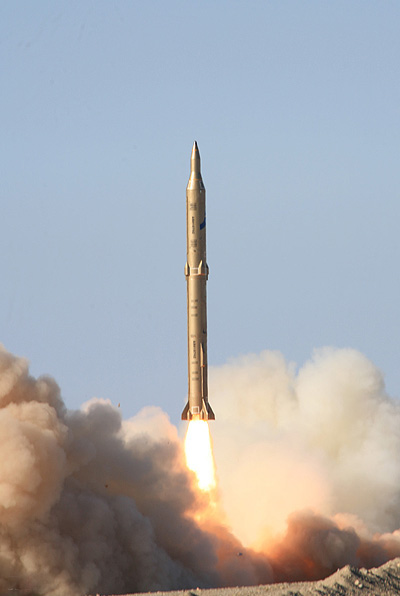
MRBM Sejjil. Iran is the world's 6th missile power, and the 5th country in the world with hypersonic missile technology

The military is organized under a unified structure, the Islamic Republic of Iran Armed Forces, comprising the Islamic Republic of Iran Army, which includes the Ground Forces, Air Defence Force, Air Force, and Navy; the Islamic Revolutionary Guard Corps, which consists of the Ground Forces, Aerospace Force, Navy, Quds Force, and Basij; and the Police Command (Faraja), which serves an analogous function to a gendarme. While the IRIAF protects the country's sovereignty in a traditional capacity, the IRGC is mandated to ensure the integrity of the Republic against foreign interference, coups, and internal riots. In 2019, the United States under President Donald Trump officially labeled the Revolutionary Guard as a foreign terrorist organization. It is the first time that an element of a foreign state was designated as a terrorist organization. Since 1925, all male citizens aged 18 must serve around 14 months in the IRIAF or IRGC.

Iran has over 610,000 active troops and around 350,000 reservists, which is at least over one million military personnel, one of the world's highest percentage of citizens with military training. The Basij, a paramilitary volunteer militia within the IRGC, has over 20 million members, 600,000 available for immediate call-up, 300,000 reservists, and one million that could be mobilized when necessary. Faraja, the Iranian uniformed police force, has over 260,000 active personnel. Most statistical organizations do not include the Basij and Faraja in their rating reports.

Iran ranks 7th in the number of active military personnel and 9th in size of both its ground force and armoured force. Iran's armed forces are the largest in West Asia and comprise the greatest Army Aviation fleet in the Middle East. Iran is among the top 15 countries in terms of military budget. In 2021, its military spending increased for the first time in four years, to $24.6 billion, 2.3% of the national GDP. Funding for the IRGC accounted for 34% of Iran's total military spending in 2021.

Since the Islamic revolution, to overcome foreign embargoes, Iran has developed a domestic military industry capable of producing indigenous tanks, armoured personnel carriers, missiles, submarines, missile destroyer, radar systems, helicopters, naval vessels, and fighter planes. Official announcements have highlighted the development of advanced weaponry, particularly in rocketry. (Note: Examples include the Hoot, Kowsar, Zelzal, Fateh-110, Shahab-3, Sejjil, Fattah, Khorramahahr, Kheibar Shekan, Emad, Ghadr-110, Hormuz-1, Dezful, Qiam 1, Ashoura, Fajr-3, Haj Qasem, Persian Gulf, Raad-500, Zolfaghar, Hoveyzeh, Soumar, Fakour-90, Paveh, Rezvan, Samen, Tondar-69.) Consequently, Iran has the largest and most diverse ballistic missile arsenal in the Middle East and is only the 5th country in the world with hypersonic missile technology. Iran designs and produces a variety of unmanned aerial vehicles. It is one of the world's five countries with cyberwarfare capabilities and is identified as "one of the most active players in the international cyber arena".

Following Russia's purchase of Iranian drones during the Russo-Ukrainian war, in November 2023, the IRIAF finalized arrangements to acquire Russian Sukhoi Su-35 fighter jets, Mil Mi-28 attack helicopters, air defense and missile systems. The Iranian Navy has had joint exercises with Russia and China.

=== Nuclear program ===
Iran's nuclear program dates back to the 1950s. In the early 1970s, the Shah revived Iran's nuclear energy ambitions as he claimed that the country "needed alternative sources of fuel for the day when the oil reserves would be depleted." Iran expanded its nuclear program after the Islamic Revolution, and its extensive nuclear fuel cycle, including enrichment capabilities, became the subject of intense international negotiations and economic sanctions. Many countries have expressed concern Iran could divert civilian nuclear technology into a weapons program. In 2015, Iran and the P5+1 agreed to the Joint Comprehensive Plan on Action, which aimed to end economic sanctions in exchange for restriction in producing enriched uranium.

In 2018, however, the US withdrew from the deal under the Trump administration and reimposed sanctions. This was met with resistance by Iran and other members of the P5+1. A year later, Iran began decreasing its compliance. By 2020, Iran announced it would no longer observe any limit set by the agreement. Progress since then has brought Iran to the nuclear threshold status. As of November 2023, Iran had uranium enriched to up to 60% fissile content, close to weapon grade. Some analysts already regard Iran as a de facto nuclear power.

=== Regional influence ===
Iran's significant influence and foothold was sometimes characterized as the "Dawn of A New Persian Empire". Some analysts associated the Iranian influence to the nation's proud national legacy, empire and history.

After the revolution, Iran grew its influence across and beyond the region. It built military forces with a wide network of state and none-state actors, starting with Hezbollah in Lebanon in 1982. The IRGC was key to Iranian influence, through its Quds Force. The instability in Lebanon (from the 1980s), Iraq (from 2003) and Yemen (from 2014) allowed Iran to build strong alliances and footholds beyond its borders. Iran had a prominent influence in the social services, education, economy and politics of Lebanon, and Lebanon provides Iran access to the Mediterranean Sea. Hezbollah's strategic successes against Israel, such as its symbolic victory during the 2006 Israel–Hezbollah War, elevated Iran's influence in the Levant and strengthened its appeal across the Muslim world.

After the US invasion of Iraq in 2003 and the arrival of ISIS in the mid-2010s, Iran financed and trained militia groups in Iraq. After the Iran-Iraq war and the fall of Saddam Hussein, Iran shaped Iraq's politics. Following Iraq's struggle against ISIS in 2014, companies linked to the IRGC such as Khatam al-Anbiya, started to build roads, power plants, hotels and businesses in Iraq, creating an economic corridor worth around $9 billion before COVID-19.

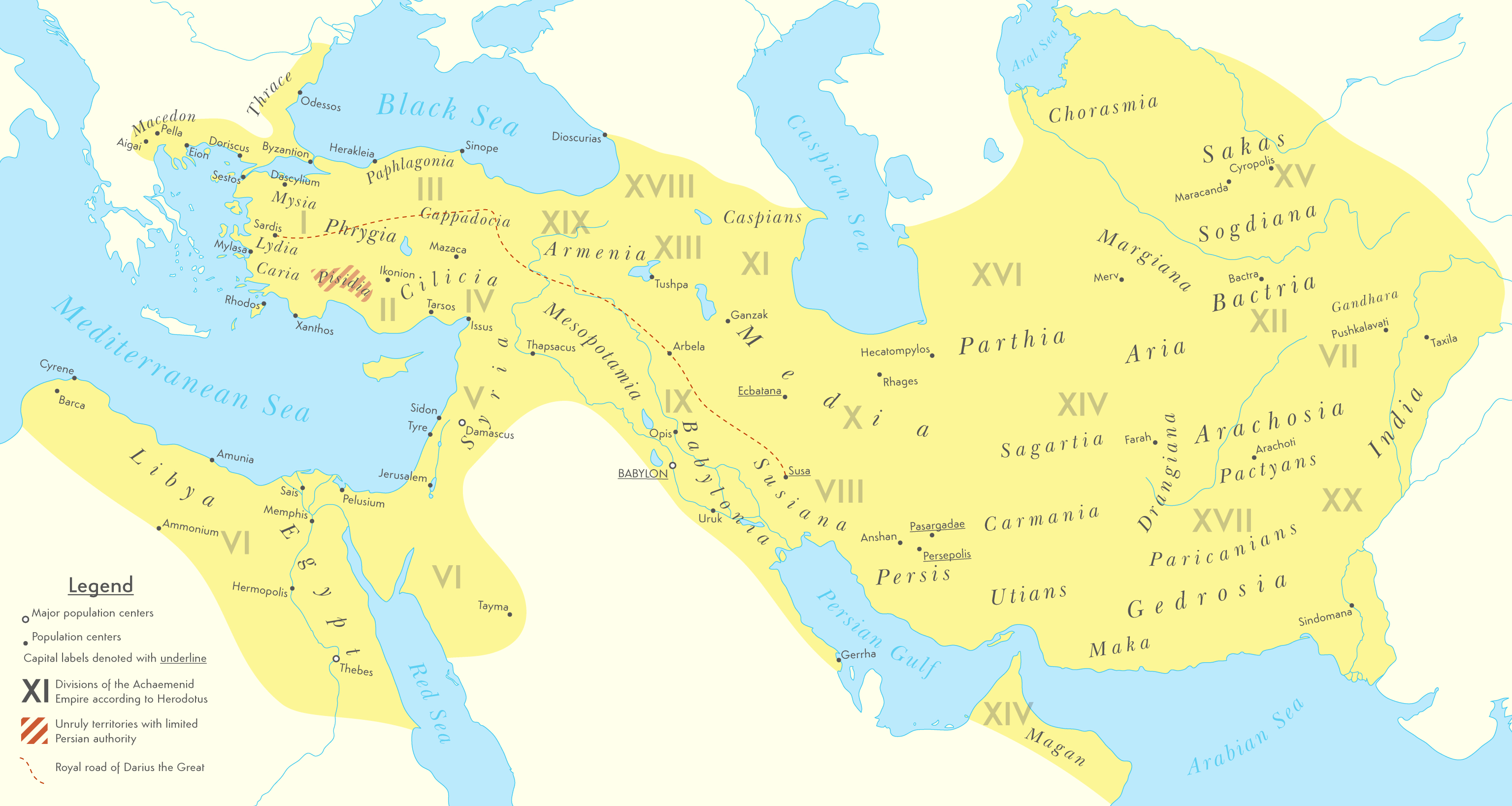
Achaemenid Empire in 500 BC

During Yemen's civil war Iran provided military support to the Houthis, a Zaydi Shia movement fighting Yemen's Sunni government since 2004, which gained significant power. Iran has considerable influence in Afghanistan through militant groups such as Fatemiyoun Division and Hezbollah Afghanistan and also in Pakistan through militant groups such as Zainabiyoun Brigade and Sipah-e-Muhammad Pakistan.

In Syria, Iran supported President Bashar al-Assad; the two countries were long-standing allies. Iran provided significant military and economic support to Assad's government, so had a considerable foothold in Syria. Iran has long supported organizations in North Africa in countries like Algeria and Tunisia. Iran embraced Hamas in part to help undermine the popularity of the Palestinian Liberation Organization (PLO). Iran's support of Hamas emerged more clearly in later years. According to US intelligence, Iran does not have full control over these state and non-state groups.

=== Censorship ===
Censorship is ranked among the most extreme worldwide. Iran has strict internet censorship, with the government persistently blocking social media and other sites. Since January 2021, authorities have blocked several social media platforms.

The 2009 election results were widely disputed, resulting in protests. The 2017–18 Iranian protests swept across the country in response to the economic and political situation. It was formally confirmed that thousands of protesters were arrested. The 2019–20 Iranian protests started on 15 November in Ahvaz, and spread across the country after the government announced increases in fuel prices of up to 300%. A week-long total Internet shutdown marked one of the most severe Internet blackouts in any country, and the bloodiest governmental crackdown of the protestors. Tens of thousands were arrested and hundreds were killed within a few days according to multiple international observers, including Amnesty International.

=== Human rights ===
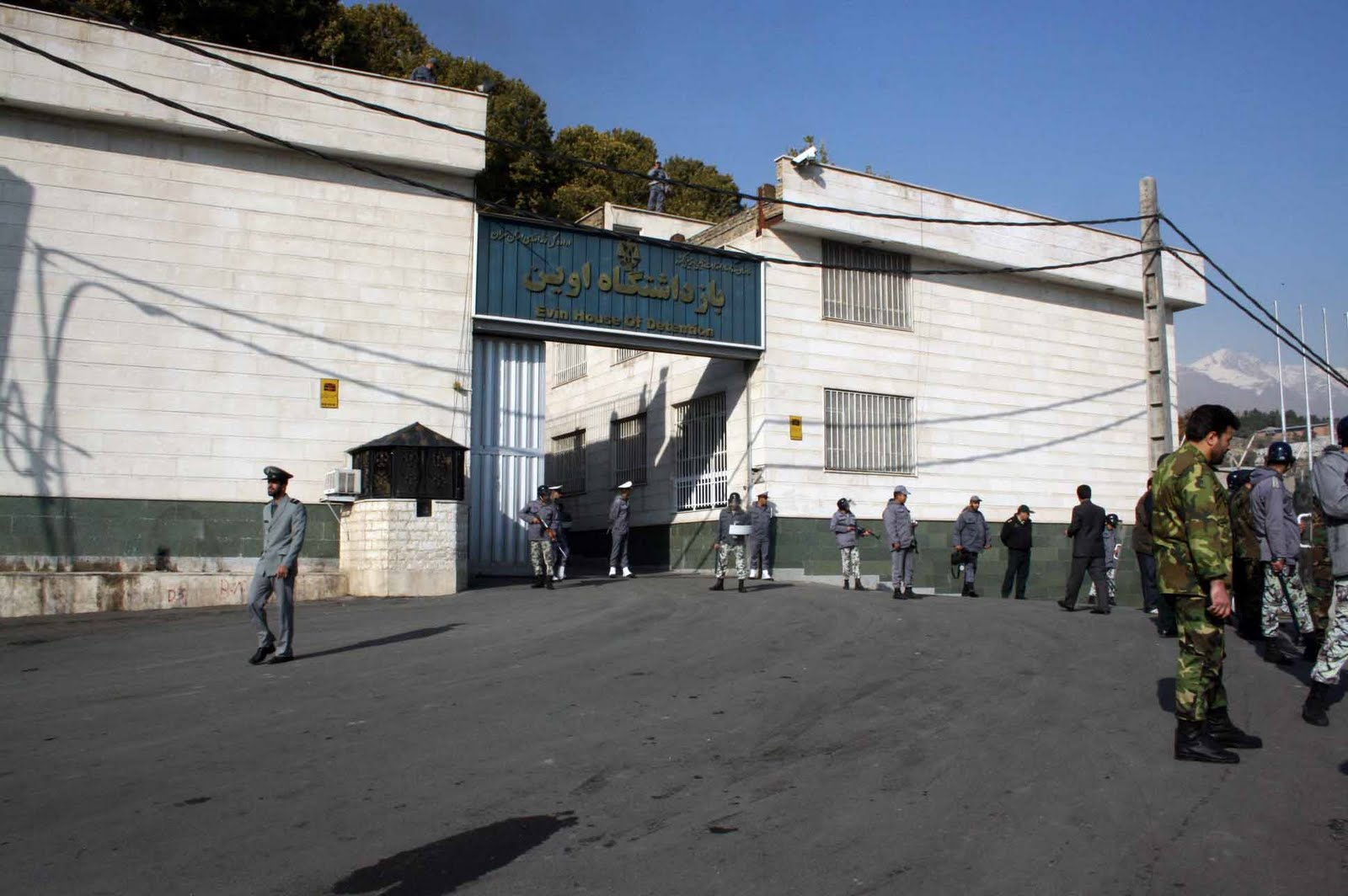
The entrance to Evin Prison, established in 1972.

The Iranian government has been denounced by various international organizations and governments for violating human rights. The government has frequently persecuted and arrested critics of the government. Iranian law does not recognise sexual orientations. Sexual activity between members of the same sex is illegal and is punishable by death. Capital punishment is a legal punishment, and Iran is reported to have the highest execution rate per capita in the world. UN Special Rapporteur Javaid Rehman has reported discrimination against several ethnic minorities in Iran. A group of UN experts in 2022 urged Iran to stop "systematic persecution" of religious minorities, adding that members of the Baháʼí Faith were arrested, barred from universities, or had their homes demolished. In 2024, a UN Special Rapporteur investigation concluded that Iran committed genocide against its political and religious minorities during 1981–1982 massacres and 1988 mass executions.

Ukraine International Airlines Flight 752 was a scheduled international civilian passenger flight from Tehran to Kyiv, operated by Ukraine International Airlines. On 8 January 2020, the Boeing 737–800 flying the route was shot down by the IRGC shortly after takeoff, killing all 176 occupants on board and leading to protests. An international investigation led to the government admitting to the shootdown, calling it a "human error". Further protests against the government began on 16 September 2022 after a woman named Mahsa Amini died in police custody following her arrest by the Guidance Patrol, known commonly as the "morality police". Government crackdown on the protests have been described by the UN to be crimes against humanity.

== Economy ==
As of 2024, Iran has the world's 19th largest economy by PPP-adjusted GDP. It is a mixture of central planning, state ownership of oil and other large enterprises, village agriculture, and small-scale private trading and service ventures. Services contribute the largest percentage of GDP, followed by industry (mining and manufacturing) and agriculture. The economy is characterized by its hydrocarbon sector, manufacturing and financial services. With 10% of the world's oil reserves and 15% of gas reserves, Iran is an energy superpower. Over 40 industries are directly involved in the Tehran Stock Exchange.

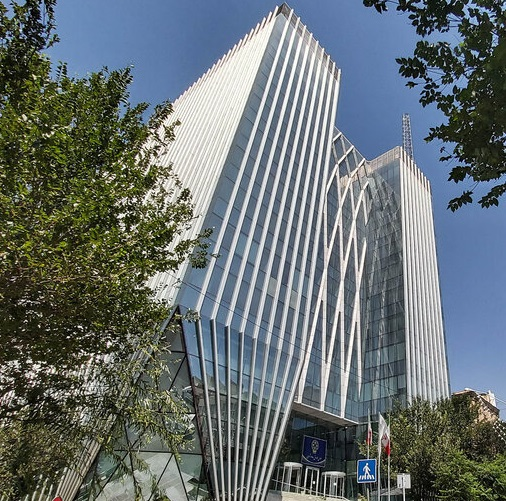
Tehran Stock Exchange

Tehran is the economic powerhouse of Iran. About 30% of Iran's public-sector workforce and 45% of its large industrial firms are located there, and half those firms' employees work for government. The Central Bank of Iran is responsible for developing and maintaining the currency: the Iranian rial. The government does not recognise trade unions other than the Islamic labour councils, which are subject to the approval of employers and the security services. Iran was the first country to introduce a national basic income in Autumn 2010. Unemployment was 9% in 2022.

Budget deficits have been a chronic problem, mostly due to large state subsidies, that include foodstuffs and especially petrol, totaling $100 billion in 2022 for energy alone. In 2010, the economic reform plan was to cut subsidies gradually and replace them with targeted social assistance. The objective is to move towards free market prices and increase productivity and social justice. The administration continues reform, and indicates it will diversify the oil-reliant economy. Iran has developed a biotechnology, nanotechnology, and pharmaceutical industry. The government is privatising industries.

Iran has leading manufacturing industries in automobile manufacture, transportation, construction materials, home appliances, food and agricultural goods, armaments, pharmaceuticals, information technology, and petrochemicals in the Middle East. It is among the world's top five producers of apricots, cherries, cucumbers and gherkins, dates, figs, pistachios, quinces, walnuts, Kiwifruit and watermelons. International sanctions against Iran have damaged the economy. Iran is one of three countries that has not ratified the Paris Agreement to limit climate change, although academics say it would be good for the country.

Iran suffers from high inflation and especially surging food prices. A major contributing factor is the involvement of the IRGC in the economy, particularly in the agriculture and food sectors but also due to significant spending on the Axis of Resistance which increase the public deficit.

=== Tourism ===
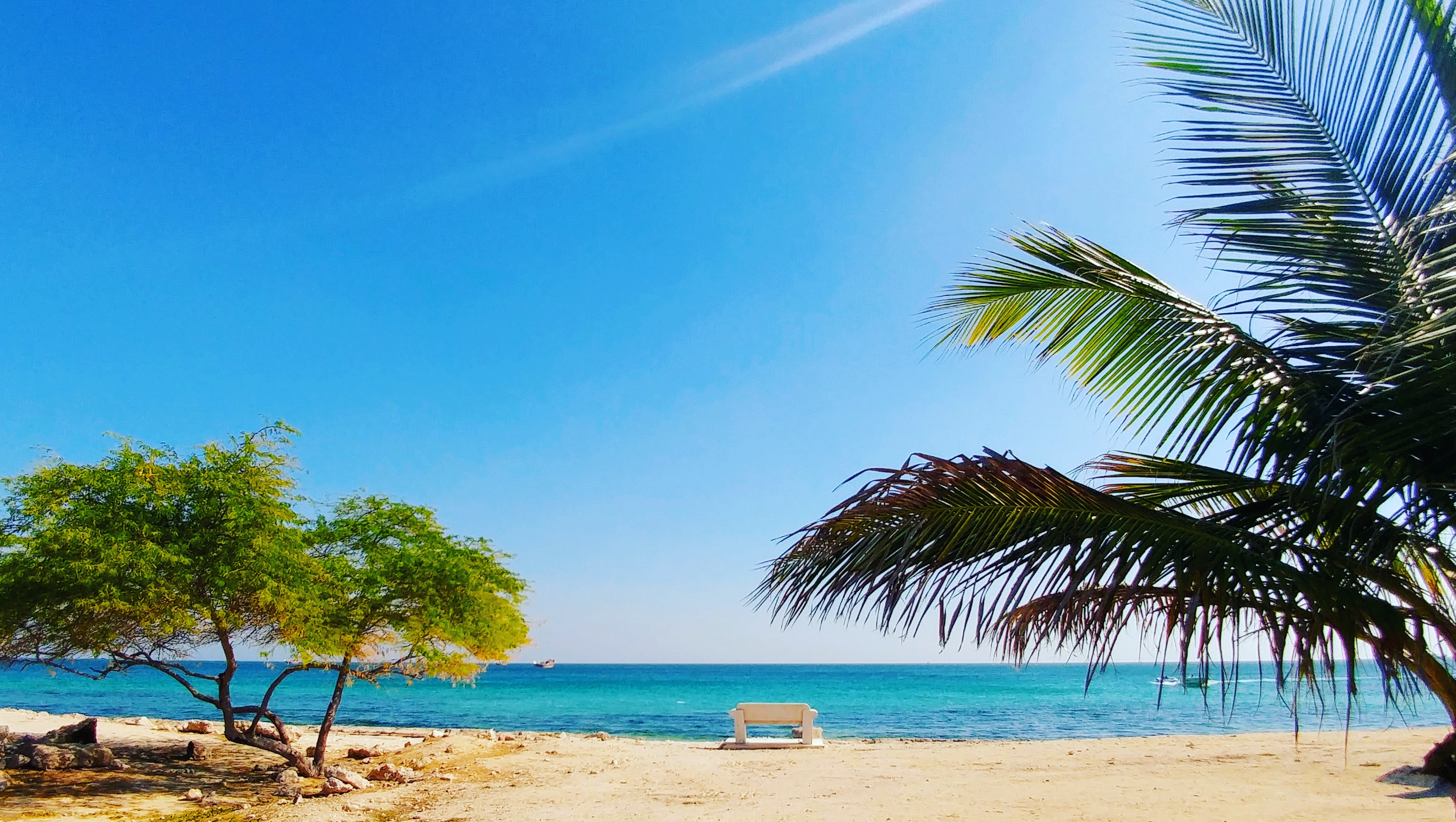
Around 12 million tourists visit Kish Island annually.

Tourism had been rapidly growing before the COVID-19 pandemic, reaching nearly nine million foreign visitors in 2019, the world's third fastest-growing tourism destination. In 2022 it expanded its share to 5% of the economy. Iran's tourism experienced a growth of 43% in 2023, attracting six million foreign tourists. The government ended visa requirements for 60 countries in 2023.

98% of visits are for leisure, while 2% are for business, indicating the country's appeal as a tourist destination. Alongside the capital, the most popular tourist destinations are Isfahan, Shiraz and Mashhad. Travellers from other West Asian countries grew 31% in the first seven months of 2023. Domestic tourism is one of the world's largest; Iranian tourists spent $33 billion in 2021. Iran projects investment of $32 billion in the tourism sector by 2026.

=== Agriculture and fishery ===
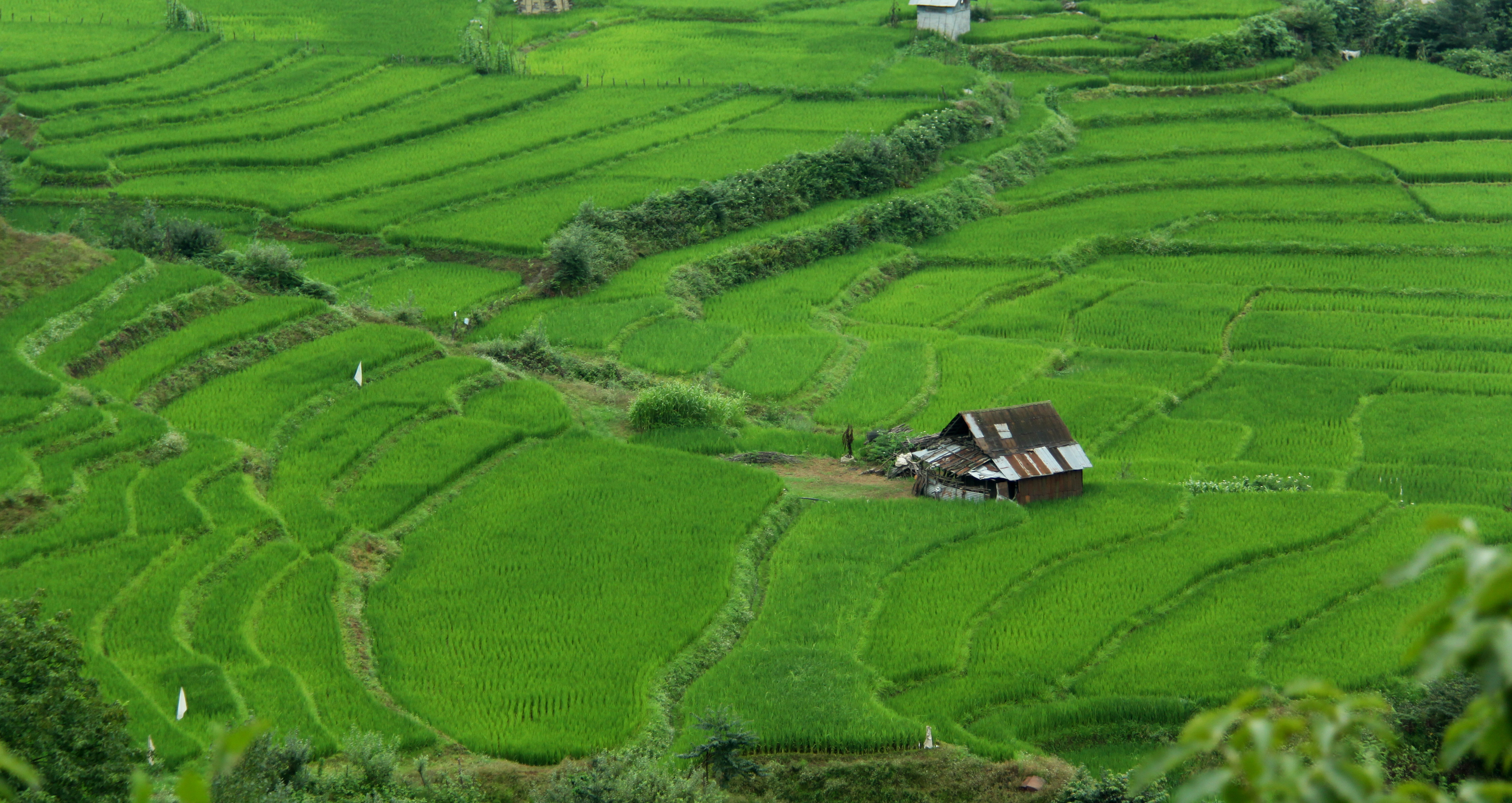
A paddy field in Bandpey, northern Iran

Roughly one-third of Iran's surface area is suitable for farmland. Only 12% of the total land area is under cultivation, and less than one-third of the cultivated area is irrigated. The rest is devoted to dryland farming. Some 92% of agricultural products depend on water. The western and northwestern portions of the country have the most fertile soils. Iran's food security index stands at around 96 percent.

3% of Iran's land area is used for grazing and fodder production. Most of the grazing is done on mostly semi-dry rangeland in mountain areas and on areas surrounding the large deserts of central Iran. Progressive government efforts and incentives during the 1990s improved agricultural productivity, helping Iran toward its goal of reestablishing national self-sufficiency in food production.

Access to the Caspian Sea, the Persian Gulf, the Gulf of Oman, and many river basins provides the potential to develop excellent fisheries. The government assumed control of commercial fishing in 1952. Expansion of the fishery infrastructure enabled Iran to harvest an estimated 700,000 tons of fish annually from the southern waters. Since the revolution, increased attention has been focused on producing fish from inland waters. Between 1976 and 2004, the combined take from inland waters by the state and private sectors increased from 1,100 tons to 110,175 tons. Iran is the world's largest producer and exporter of caviar, exporting more than 300 tonnes annually.

=== Industry and services ===
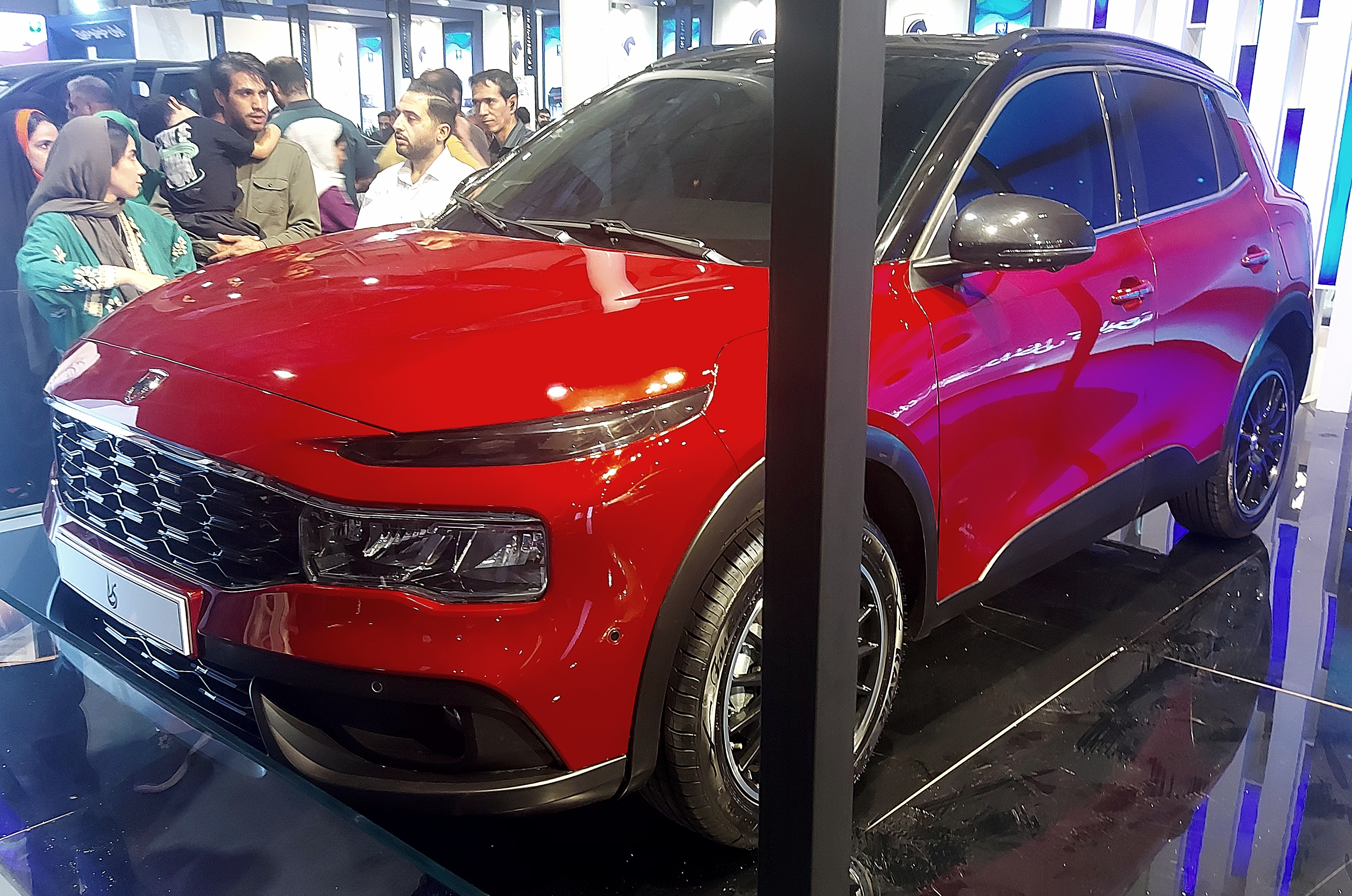
Iran is the world's 16th largest car manufacturer, with IKCO being the largest in the Middle East, Central Asia and North Africa.

In 2024, Iran was ranked 16th in global car manufacturing, ahead of the UK, Italy, and Russia. It built 1.188 million cars in 2023, a 12% growth compared to the previous years. Iran exports cars to countries such as Venezuela, Russia and Belarus. From 2008 to 2009, Iran leaped to 28th place from 69th in annual industrial production growth rate. Iranian contractors have been awarded several foreign tender contracts in different fields of construction of dams, bridges, roads, buildings, railroads, power generation, and gas, oil and petrochemical industries. In 2011, some 66 Iranian industrial companies were carrying out projects in 27 countries. Iran exported over $20 billion worth of technical and engineering services over 2001–2011. The availability of local raw materials, rich mineral reserves, experienced manpower have all played crucial role in winning the bids.

45% of large industrial firms are located in Tehran, and almost half of their workers work for government. The Iranian retail industry is largely in the hands of cooperatives, many of them government-sponsored, and of independent retailers in the bazaars. The bulk of food sales occur at street markets, where the Chief Statistics Bureau sets the prices.

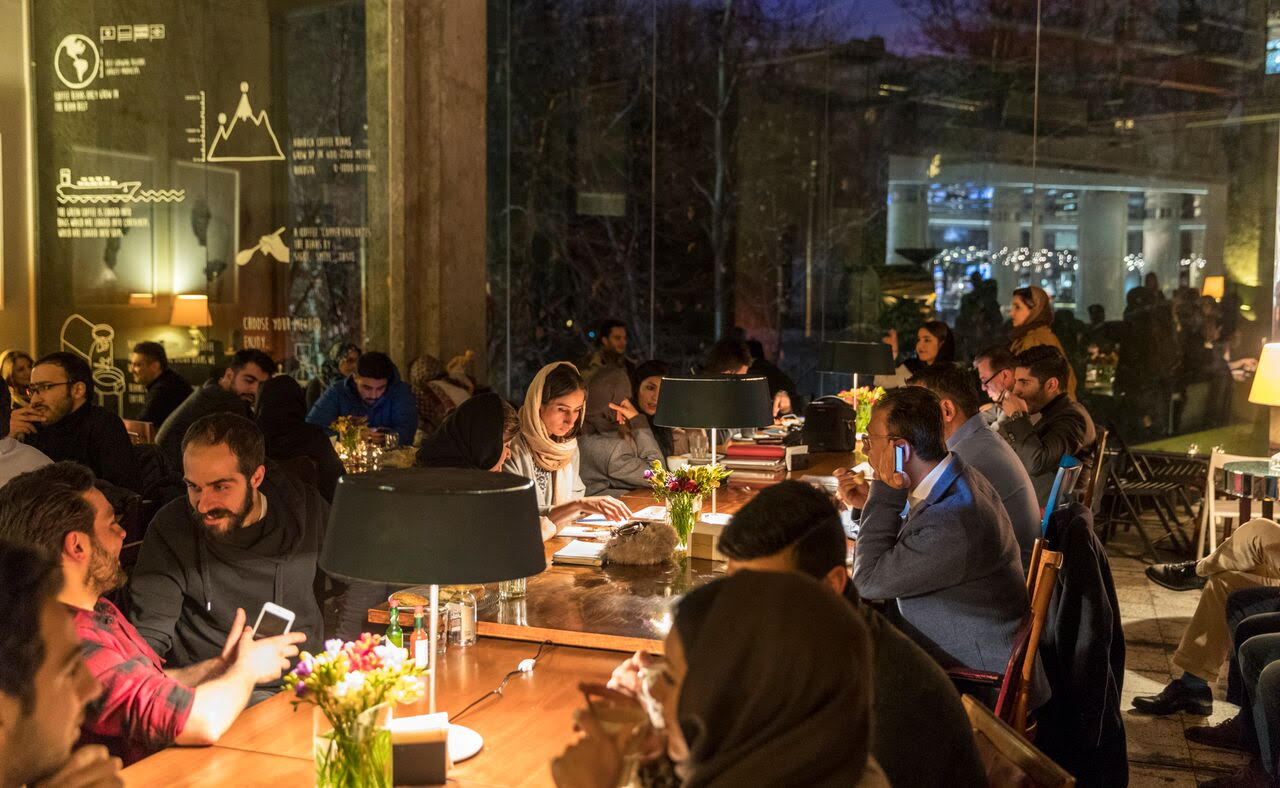
Modern café in Tehran

Iran's automotive industry is the second most active industry of Iran, after its oil and gas industry. ITMCO is the biggest tractor manufacturer in the Middle East. Iran is the 12th largest automaker in the world. Construction is one of the most important sectors in Iran. The annual turnover in the construction industry amounts to US$38.4 billion. The Central Bank of Iran indicates that 70 percent of the Iranians own homes, with huge amounts of idle money entering the housing market.

Iran is ranked among 15 major mineral-rich countries. Iran has become self-sufficient in designing, building and operating dams and power plants. Iran is one of the six countries in the world that manufacture gas- and steam-powered turbines.

=== Energy ===
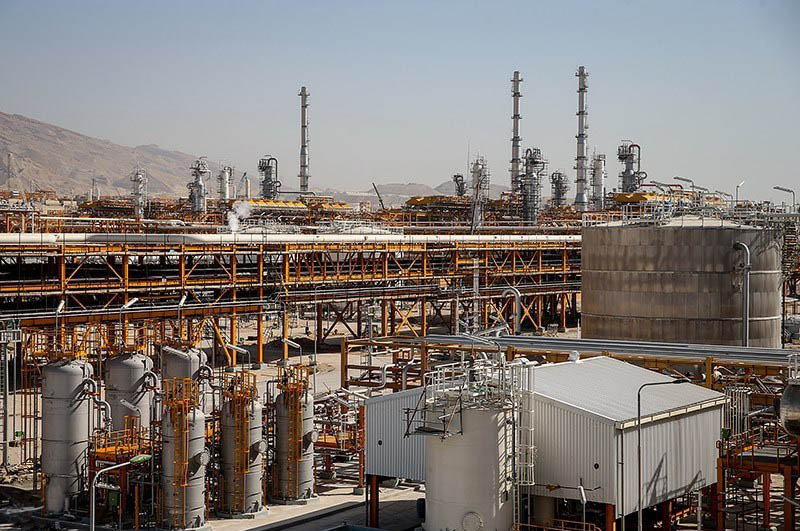
South Pars Gas-Condensate field, the world's largest gas field, holds 8% of Earth's gas reserves.

Iran is an energy superpower, and petroleum plays a key part. As of 2023, Iran produced 4% of the world's crude oil (3.6 million barrels (570,000 m^{3}) per day), which generates US$36bn of export revenue and is the main source of foreign currency. Oil and gas reserves are estimated at 1.2 trn barrels; Iran holds 10% of world oil reserves and 15% for gas. Iran ranks 3rd in oil reserves and is OPEC's 2nd largest exporter. Iran has the 2nd largest gas reserves, and 3rd largest natural gas production. In 2019, Iran discovered a southern oil field of 50 bn barrels. In April 2024, the NIOC discovered 10 giant shale oil deposits, totaling 2.6 billion barrels.

Iran manufactures 60–70% of its industrial equipment domestically, including turbines, pumps, catalysts, refineries, oil tankers, drilling rigs, offshore platforms, towers, pipes, and exploration instruments. The addition of new hydroelectric stations and streamlining of conventional coal and oil-fired stations increased installed capacity to 33 GW; about 75% was based on natural gas, 18% on oil, and 7% on hydroelectric power. In 2004, Iran opened its first wind-powered and geothermal plants, and the first solar thermal plant began in 2009. Iran is the world's third country to develop GTL technology.

Demographic trends and intensified industrialization have caused electric power demand to grow by 8% per year. The government's goal of 53 GW of installed capacity by 2010 is to be reached by bringing on line new gas-fired plants, and adding hydropower and nuclear generation capacity. Iran's first nuclear power plant went online in 2011. Despite being an energy superpower, as of 2024, Iran suffers from an energy crisis, manifested by many power outages.

=== Science and technology ===
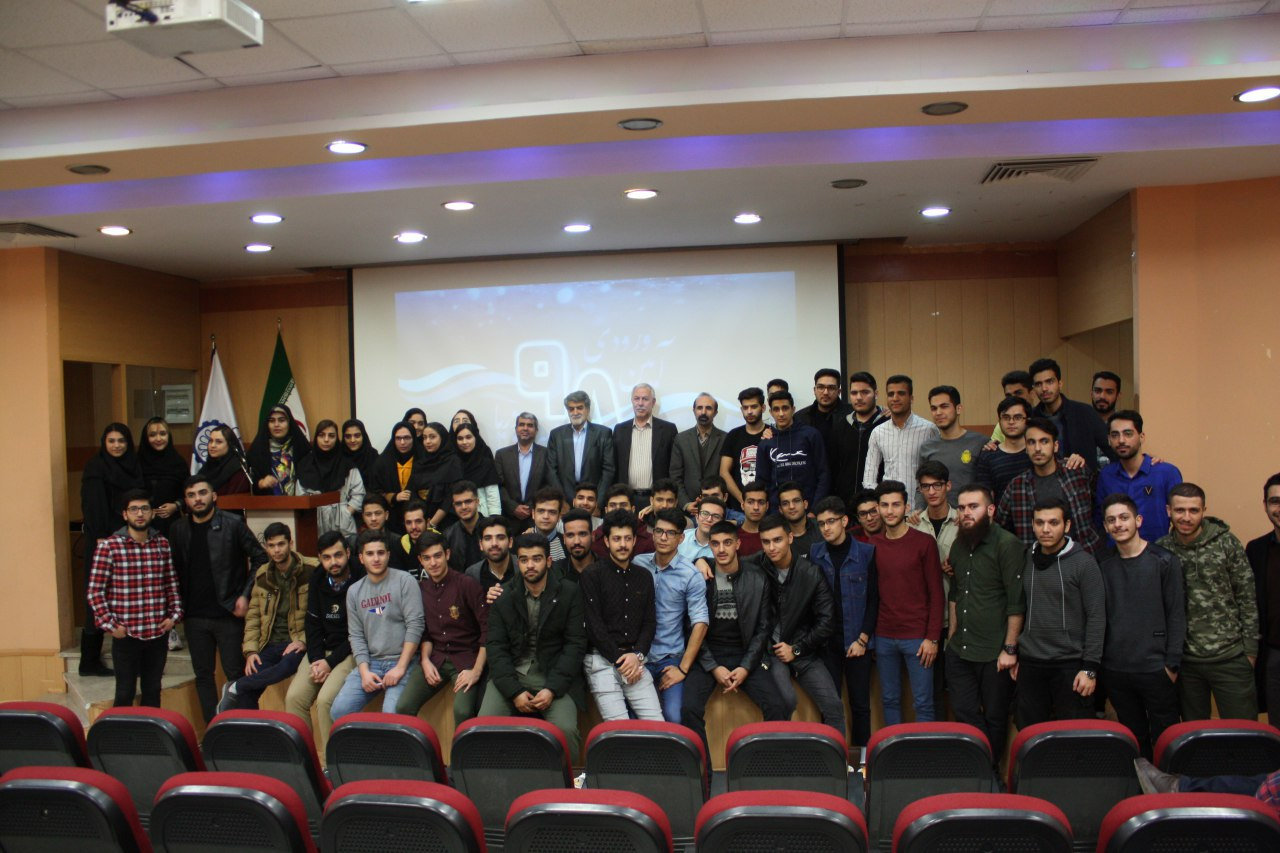
Students of Amirkabir University of Technology in Tehran

Iran has made considerable advances in science and technology, despite international sanctions. In the biomedical sciences, the Institute of Biochemistry and Biophysics has a UNESCO chair in biology. In 2006, Iranian scientists successfully cloned a sheep at the Royan Research Centre in Tehran. Stem cell research is among the top 10 in the world. Iran ranks 15th in the world in nanotechnologies. Iranian scientists outside Iran have made major scientific contributions. In 1960, Ali Javan co-invented the first gas laser, and fuzzy set theory was introduced by Lotfi A. Zadeh.

Cardiologist Tofy Mussivand invented and developed the first artificial cardiac pump, the precursor of the artificial heart. Furthering research in diabetes, the HbA1c was discovered by Samuel Rahbar. Many papers in string theory are published in Iran. In 2014, Iranian mathematician Maryam Mirzakhani became the first woman, and Iranian, to receive the Fields Medal, the highest prize in mathematics.

Iran increased its publication output nearly tenfold from 1996 through 2004, and ranked first in output growth rate, followed by China. According to a study by SCImago in 2012, Iran would rank fourth in research output by 2018, if the trend persisted. The Iranian humanoid robot Sorena 2, which was designed by engineers at the University of Tehran, was unveiled in 2010. The Institute of Electrical and Electronics Engineers (IEEE) has placed the name of Surena among the five most prominent robots, after analysing its performance.

According to a 2019 study by Isabel Campos-Varela et al., Iran recorded the highest proportion of retracted publications globally, with 15.52 retractions per 10,000 publications. Media reports from 2023 indicate that Iran continues to rank among the countries with the highest retraction rates. Common types of misconduct include fraudulent peer review processes, plagiarism, and data fabrication. Data from the Retraction Watch Leaderboard further highlights that two of the 32 individuals with the highest number of retracted articles worldwide are based in Iran. Iran was ranked 70th in the Global Innovation Index in 2025.

==== Iranian Space Agency ====
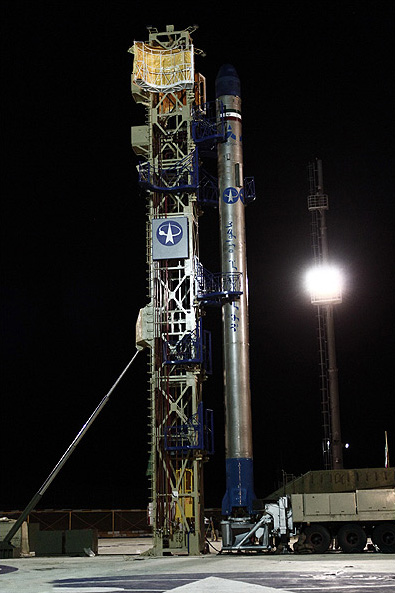
Historic launch of Safir in 2012

The Iranian Space Agency was established in 2004. Iran became an orbital-launch-capable nation in 2009 and is a founding member of the United Nations Committee on the Peaceful Uses of Outer Space. Iran placed its domestically built satellite Omid into orbit on the 30th anniversary of the revolution, in 2009, through its first expendable launch vehicle Safir. It became the 9th country capable of both producing a satellite and sending it into space from a domestically made launcher. Simorgh's launch in 2016, is the successor of Safir.

In January 2024, Iran launched the Soraya satellite into its highest orbit yet (750 km), a space launch milestone for the country. It was launched by Qaem 100 rocket. Iran also successfully launched 3 indigenous satellites, The Mahda, Kayan and Hatef, into orbit using the Simorgh carrier rocket. It was the first time in the country's history that it simultaneously sent three satellites into space. The three satellites are designed for testing advanced satellite subsystems, space-based positioning technology, and narrowband communication.

In February 2024, Iran launched its domestically developed imaging satellite, Pars 1, from Russia into orbit. This was the second time since August 2022, when Russia launched another Iranian remote-sensing, Khayyam satellite, into orbit from Kazakhstan, reflecting deep scientific cooperation between the countries.

=== Telecommunication ===
The telecommunications industry is almost entirely state-owned, dominated by the Telecommunication Company of Iran. As of 2020, 70 million Iranians use high-speed mobile internet. Iran is among the first five countries which have had a growth rate of over 20 percent and the highest level of development in telecommunication. Iran has been awarded the UNESCO special certificate for providing telecommunication services to rural areas.

Globally, Iran ranks 75th in mobile internet speed and 153rd in fixed internet speed.

== Demographics ==
Population of Iranian provinces and counties in 2021

Iran's population grew rapidly from about 19 million in 1956 to about 85 million by February 2023. Iran's fertility rate has dropped dramatically, from 6.5 children born per woman to about 1.7 two decades later, leading to a population growth rate of about 1.39% in 2018. Due to its young population, studies project that the growth will continue to slow until it stabilises at around 105 million by 2050.

Iran hosts one of the largest refugee populations, with almost one million, mostly from Afghanistan and Iraq. As of 2025, Iran was home to an estimated four million Afghan migrants and refugees. According to the Iranian Constitution, the government is required to provide every citizen with access to social security, covering retirement, unemployment, old age, disability, accidents, calamities, health and medical treatment and care services. This is covered by tax revenues and income derived from public contributions.

Iran has one of the highest urban growth rates in the world. From 1950 to 2002, the urban proportion of the population increased from 27% to 60%. Iran's population is concentrated in its western half, especially in the north, north-west and west. Tehran, with a population of around 9.4 million, is Iran's capital and largest city. Iran's second most populous city, Mashhad, has a population of around 3.4 million, and is capital of the province of Razavi Khorasan. Isfahan has a population of around 2.2 million and is Iran's third most populous city. It is the capital of Isfahan province and was the third capital of the Safavid Empire.

Largest cities or towns in Iran 2016 census
Rank	Name	Province	Pop.	Rank	Name	Province	Pop.
1	Tehran	Tehran	8,693,706	11	Rasht	Gilan	679,995
2	Mashhad	Razavi Khorasan	3,001,184	12	Zahedan	Sistan and Baluchestan	587,730
3	Isfahan	Isfahan	1,961,260	13	Hamadan	Hamadan	554,406
4	Karaj	Alborz	1,592,492	14	Kerman	Kerman	537,718
5	Shiraz	Fars	1,565,572	15	Yazd	Yazd	529,673
6	Tabriz	East Azarbaijan	1,558,693	16	Ardabil	Ardabil	529,374
7	Qom	Qom	1,201,158	17	Bandar Abbas	Hormozgan	526,648
8	Ahvaz	Khuzestan	1,184,788	18	Arak	Markazi	520,944
9	Kermanshah	Kermanshah	946,651	19	Eslamshahr	Tehran	448,129
10	Urmia	West Azarbaijan	736,224	20	Zanjan	Zanjan	430,871

=== Ethnic groups ===
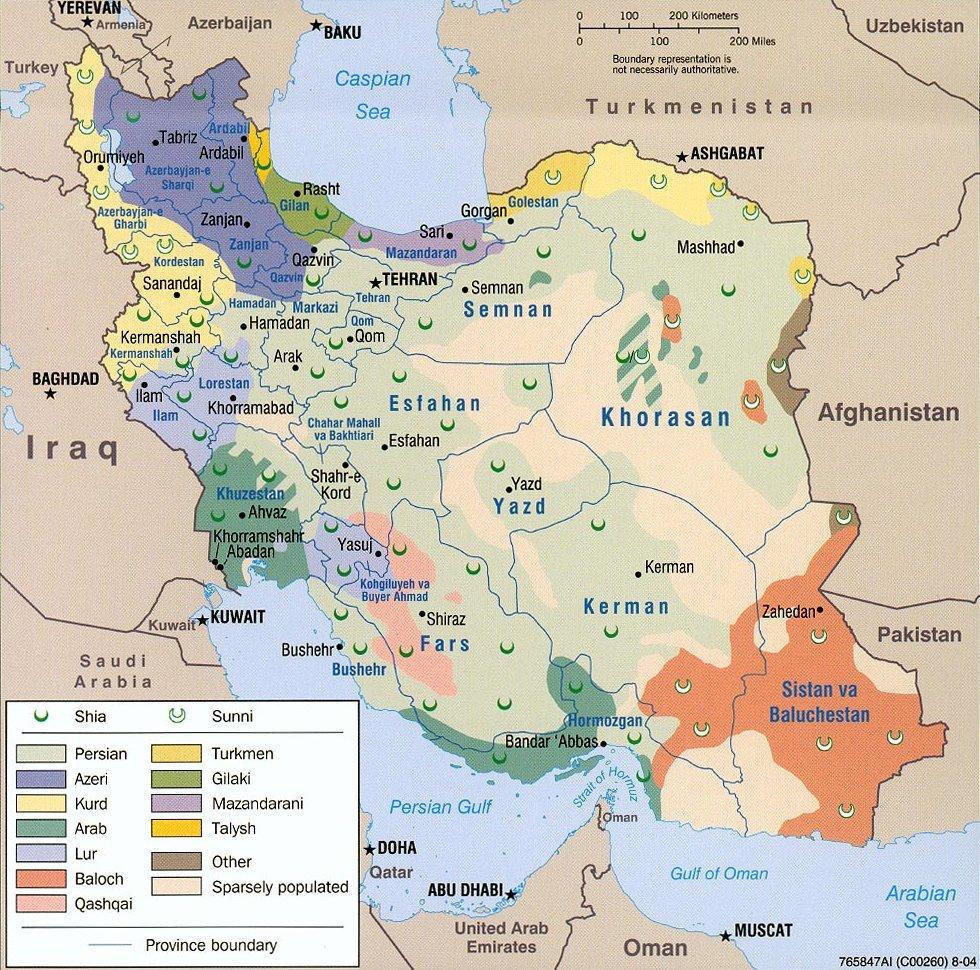
Colour-coded map of Iran's ethnic groups

Ethnic group composition remains a point of debate, mainly regarding the largest and second-largest ethnic groups, the Persians and Azerbaijanis, due to the lack of Iranian state censuses based on ethnicity.

According to a 2003 estimate, Persians make up 51% of the population, while Azerbaijanis make up 24%, Gilaks and Mazanderanis 8%, Kurds 7%, Arabs 3%, Lurs 2%, Balochis 2%, Turkmens 2%, and other groups (including Armenians, Jews, Assyrians, Qashqai, Shahsevan) make up the remaining 1%. The World Factbook at 2011 gives the same figures. The Library of Congress in 2008 issued slightly different estimates: 65% Persians (also including Gilaks and Mazenderanis (Note: "The Factbook puts 'Persian and Persian dialects' at 58 percent, but 51 percent of the population as ethnic Persians, while the Library of Congress states that Persian 'is spoken as a mother tongue by at least 65 percent of the population and as a second language by a large proportion of the remaining 35 percent. The 'Persian' mentioned in the latter report must thus also include Gilaki and Mazi. However, Gilaki and Mazi are actually from a different branch of the Iranian language subfamily than Persian, and could be as such be seen not as dialects, but as distinct languages. Suffice it here to say that while some scholars see categories such as Gilakis and Mazandaranis as referring to separate ethnic groups due to their linguistic traits, others count them as 'Persians' on exactly the same basis.")), 16% Azerbaijanis, 7% Kurds, 6% Lurs, 2% Arabs, 2% Balochis, 1% Turkic tribal groups (such as Qashqai), and non-Persian, non-Turkic groups (including Armenians, Assyrians, and Georgians) less than 1%.

Minorities in Iran have been disproportionately affected by the ongoing crackdown aimed at repressing the "Woman, Life, Freedom" movement, according to the UN Fact-Finding Mission.

=== Languages ===
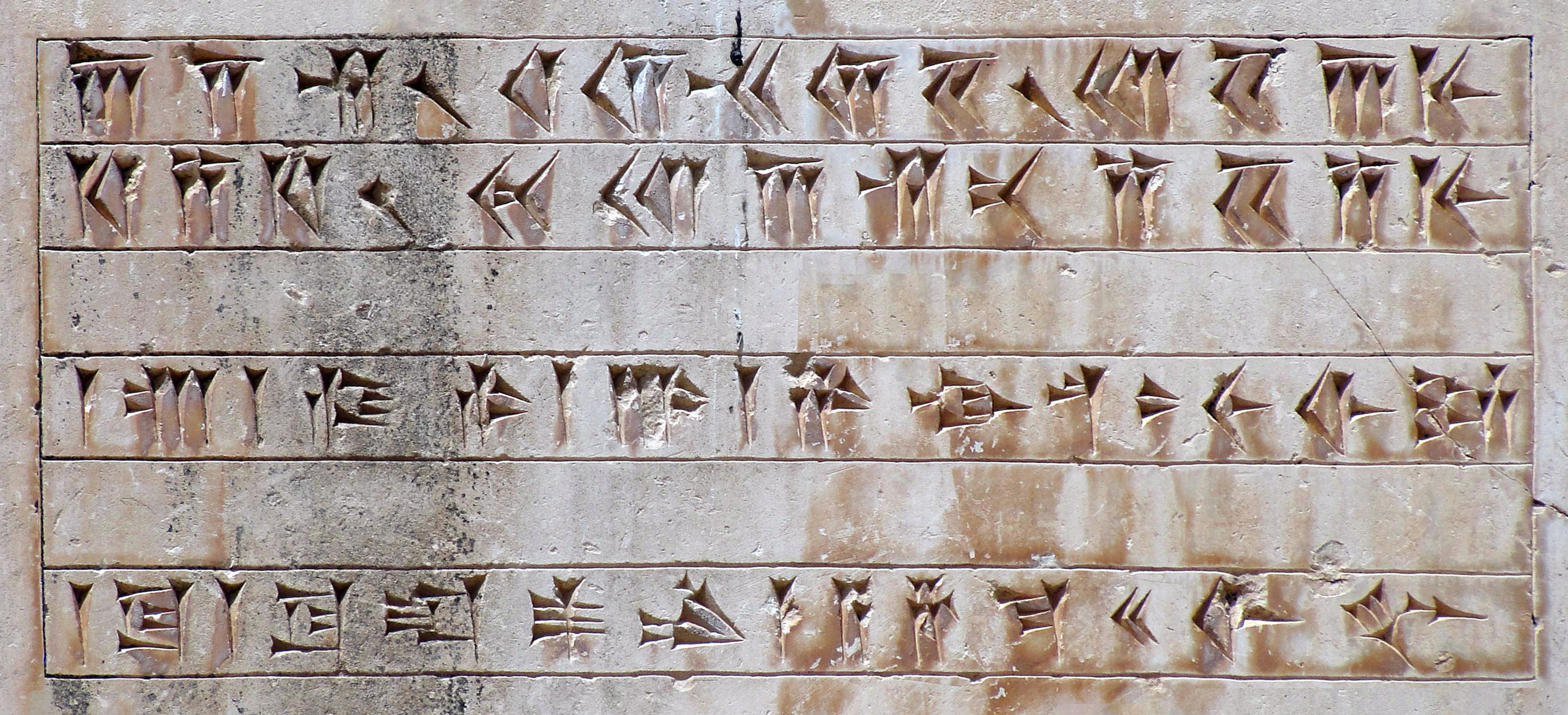
"I am Cyrus the king, an Achaemenid", in Old Persian, Elamite and Akkadian languages; Pasargadae, World Heritage Site

Most of the population speaks Persian, Iran's official and national language. Others include speakers of other Iranian languages, within the greater Indo-European family, and languages belonging to other ethnicities. The Gilaki and Mazenderani languages are widely spoken in Gilan and Mazenderan, northern Iran. The Talysh language is spoken in parts of Gilan. Varieties of Kurdish are concentrated in the province of Kurdistan and nearby areas. In Khuzestan, several dialects of Persian are spoken. South Iran also houses the Luri and Lari languages.

Azerbaijani, the most-spoken minority language in Iran, and other Turkic languages and dialects are found in various regions, especially Azerbaijan. Notable minority languages include Armenian, Georgian, Neo-Aramaic, and Arabic. Khuzi Arabic is spoken by the Arabs in Khuzestan, and the wider group of Iranian Arabs. Circassian was once widely spoken by the large Circassian minority, but, due to assimilation, no sizable number of Circassians speak the language anymore.

=== Religion ===
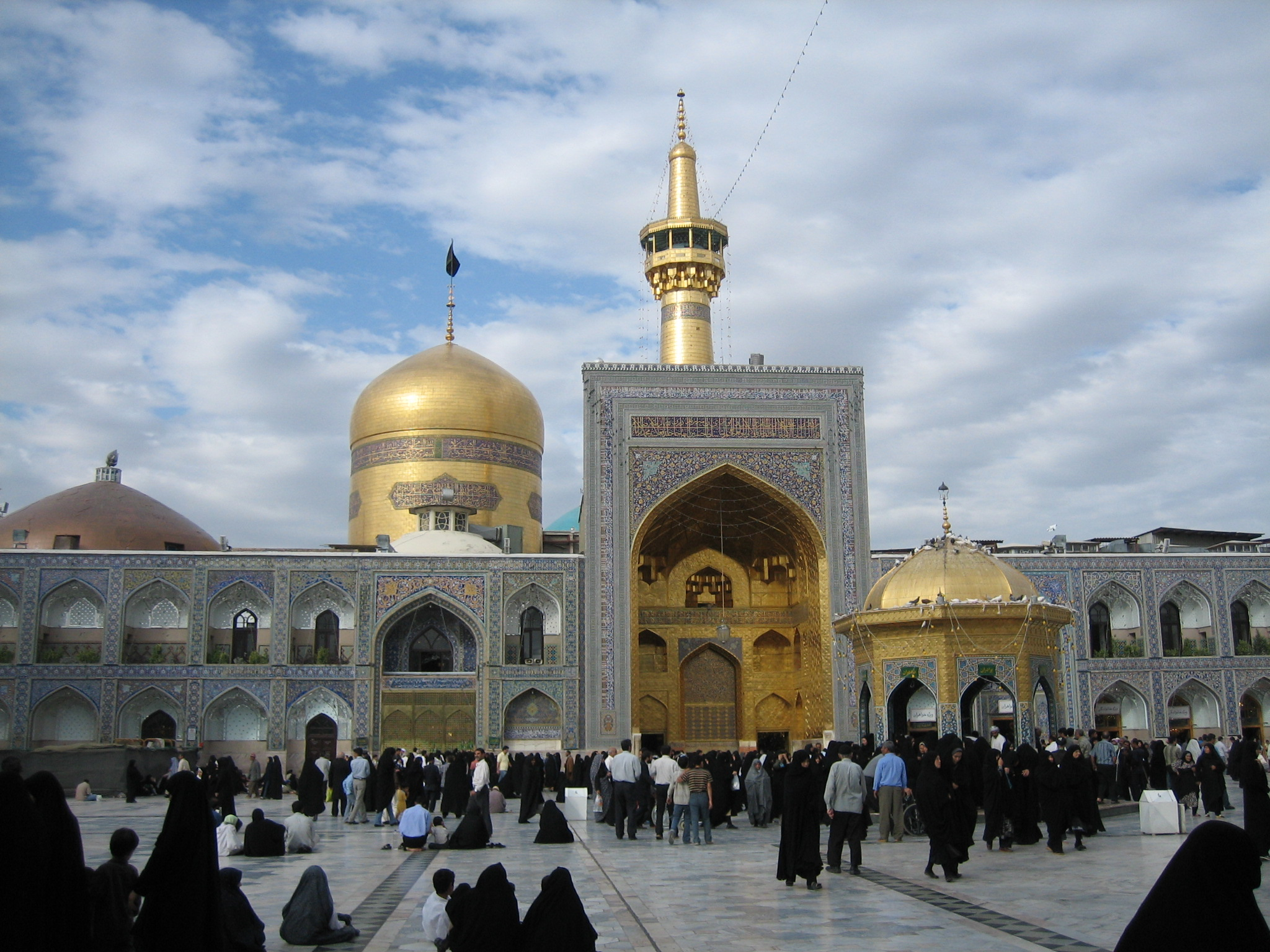
The Imam Reza shrine in Mashhad is the most sacred site in Iran and a major center of pilgrimage for Shia Muslims, containing the mausoleum of the eighth Imam.

Twelver Shi'a Islam is the state religion, which 90–95% of Iranians adhere to according to both official and unofficial sources, such as the CIA. About 5–10% of the population follow the Sunni branch of Islam, mainly the Hanafi school.

The Sunni branch of Islam, Christianity, Judaism, and Zoroastrianism are officially recognized by the government and have reserved seats in the Parliament. There is a large population of adherents to Yarsanism, a Kurdish indigenous religion, estimated to comprise 500,000 to 1,000,000 followers. The Baháʼí Faith is not officially recognized and has been subject to official persecution; the persecution of Baháʼís has increased since the revolution. Freedom of religion is limited, irreligion is not recognized by the government and conversion away from Islam is persecuted. Iran is home to the largest Jewish community in the Muslim world and the Middle East, outside of Israel. Around 250,000 to 370,000 Christians reside in Iran, and it is the largest recognized minority religion. Most are of Armenian background, as well as a sizable minority of Assyrians. The Iranian government has supported the rebuilding and renovation of Armenian churches and has supported the Armenian Monastic Ensembles of Iran. In 2019, the government registered the Vank Cathedral in Isfahan as a World Heritage Site. Three Armenian churches in Iran are included in the World Heritage List.

=== Education ===
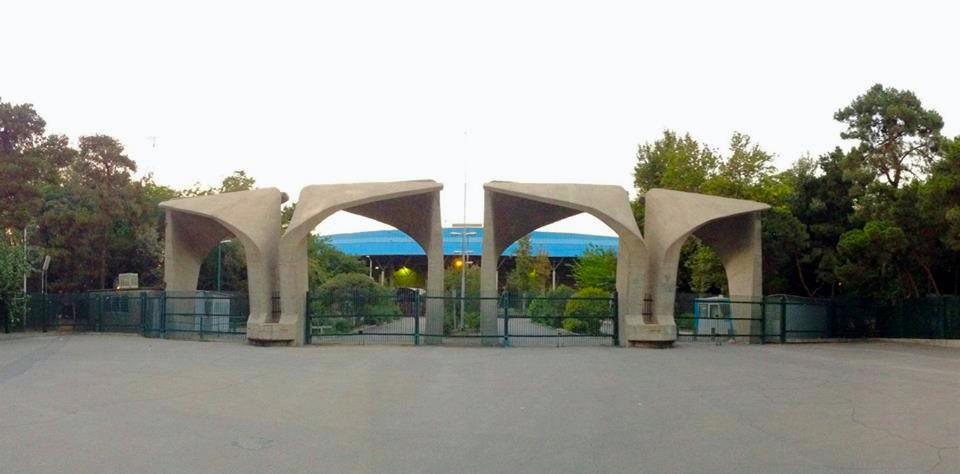
University of Tehran, the oldest Iranian university (1851), and among the world's top universities

Education is highly centralized. K–12 is supervised by the Ministry of Education. Higher education is supervised by the Ministry of Science and Technology. Literacy among people aged 15 and older was 86% as of 2016, with men (90%) significantly more literate than women (81%). Government expenditure on education is around 4% of GDP.

The requirement to enter into higher education is to have a high school diploma and pass the Iranian University Entrance Exam. Many students do a one–two-year course of pre-university. Iran's higher education has different levels of diplomas, including an associate degree in two years, a bachelor's degree in four years, and a master's degree in two years, after which another exam allows the candidate to pursue a doctoral programme.

=== Health ===
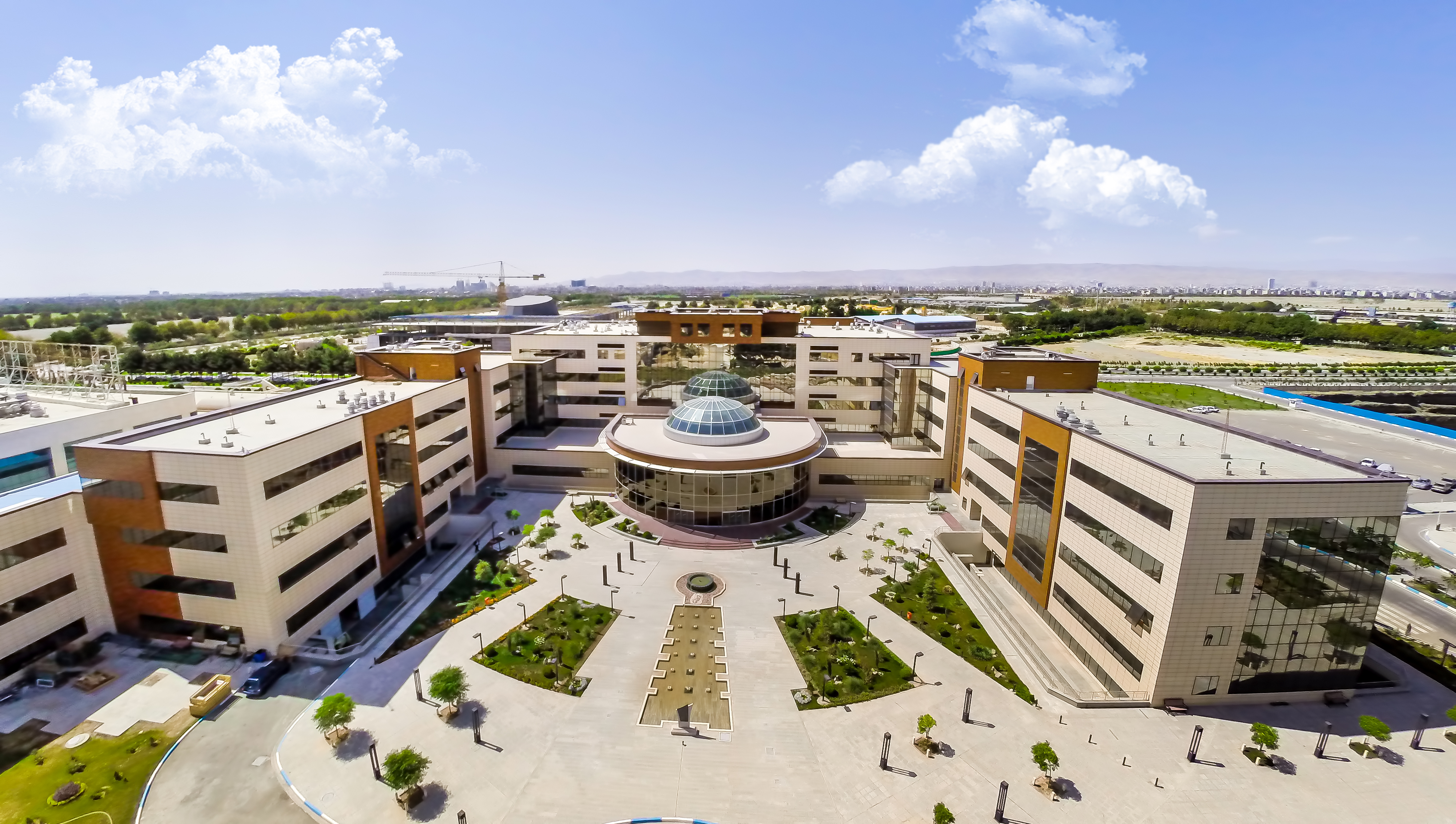
Razavi Hospital, accredited by ACI for its quality health services

Healthcare is provided by the public-governmental system, the private sector, and NGOs. Iran is the only country in the world with a legal organ trade. Iran has been able to extend public health preventive services through the establishment of an extensive Primary Health Care Network. As a result, child and maternal mortality rates have fallen significantly, and life expectancy at birth has risen. Iran's medical knowledge rank is 17th globally and 1st in the Middle East and North Africa. In terms of medical science production index, Iran ranks 16th in the world. Iran is fast emerging as a preferred destination for medical tourism.

Iran faces the common problem of other young demographic nations in the region, which is keeping pace with growth of an already huge demand for public services. An anticipated increase in the population growth rate will increase the need for public health infrastructures and services. In 2016, about 90% of Iranians had health insurance.

== Culture ==
=== Art ===
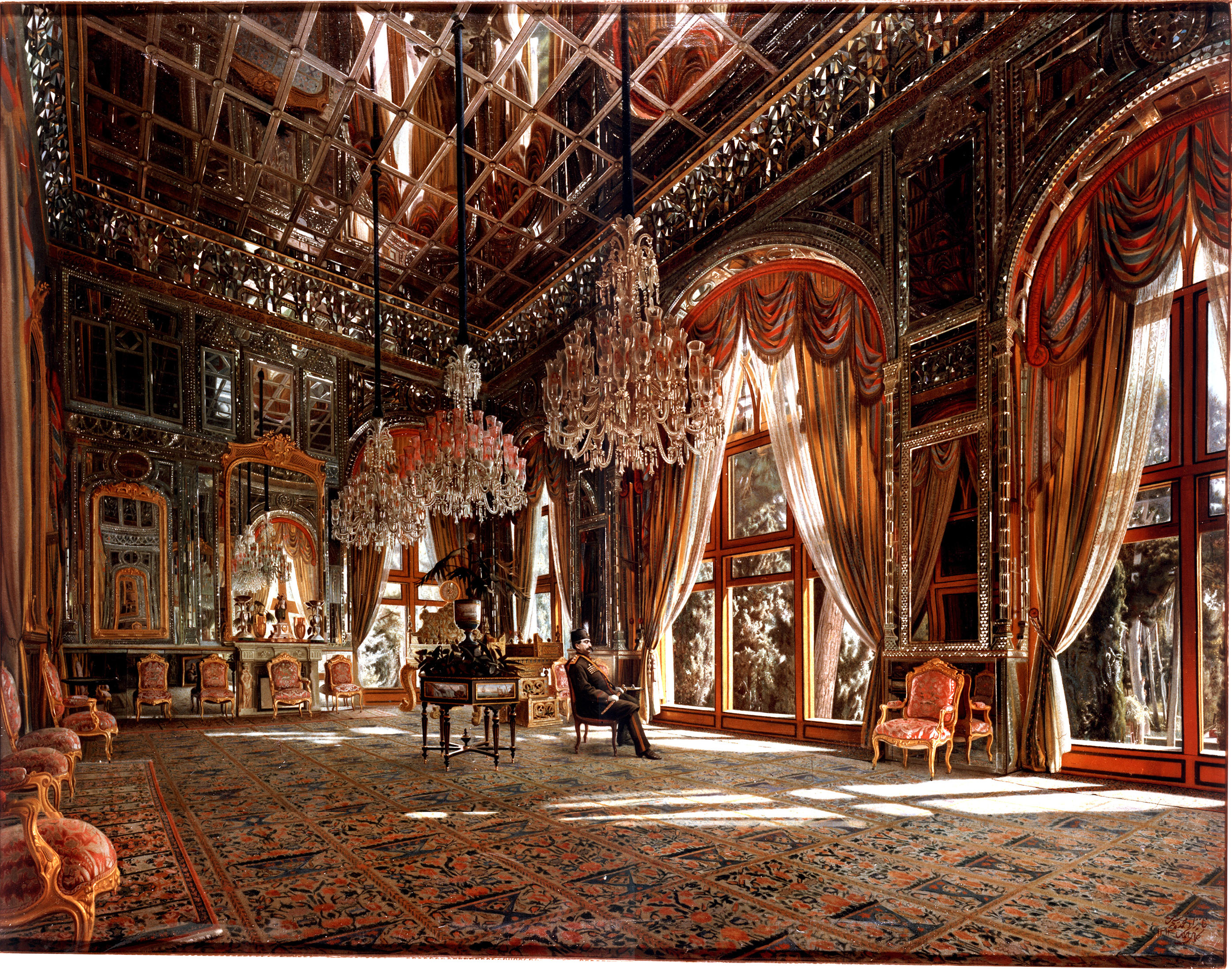
Kamal-ol-molk's Mirror Hall of Golestan Palace, often considered a starting point in Iranian modern art

Iran has one of the richest art heritages in history and been strong in many media including architecture, painting, literature, music, metalworking, stonemasonry, weaving, calligraphy and sculpture. At different times, influences from neighboring civilizations have been important, and latterly Persian art gave and received major influences as part of the wider styles of Islamic art.

From the Achaemenid Empire (550–330 BC), the courts of successive dynasties led the style of Persian art, and court-sponsored art left many of the most impressive pieces that remain. The Islamic style of dense decoration, geometrically laid out, developed in Iran into an elegant and harmonious style, combining motifs derived from plants with Chinese motifs such as the cloud-band, and often animals represented at a smaller scale. During the Safavid Empire in the 16th century, this style was used across a variety of media, and diffused from the court artists of the king, most being painters.

By the time of the Sasanians, Iranian art had a renaissance. During the Middle Ages, Sasanian art played a prominent role in the formation of European and Asian mediaeval art. The Safavid era is known as the Golden Age of Iranian art. Safavid art exerted noticeable influences upon the Ottomans, the Mughals, and the Deccans, and was influential through its fashion and garden architecture on 11th–17th-century Europe.

Iran's contemporary art traces its origins to Kamal-ol-molk, a prominent realist painter at the Qajar court who affected the norms of painting and adopted a naturalistic style that would compete with photographic works. A new Iranian school of fine art was established by him in 1928, and was followed by the so-called "coffeehouse" style of painting. Iran's avant-garde modernists emerged by the arrival of new western influences during World War II. The contemporary art scene originates in the late 1940s, and Tehran's first modern art gallery, Apadana, was opened in 1949 by Mahmud Javadipur, Hosein Kazemi, and Hushang Ajudani. The new movements received official encouragement by the 1950s, which led to the emergence of artists such as Marcos Grigorian.

=== Architecture ===
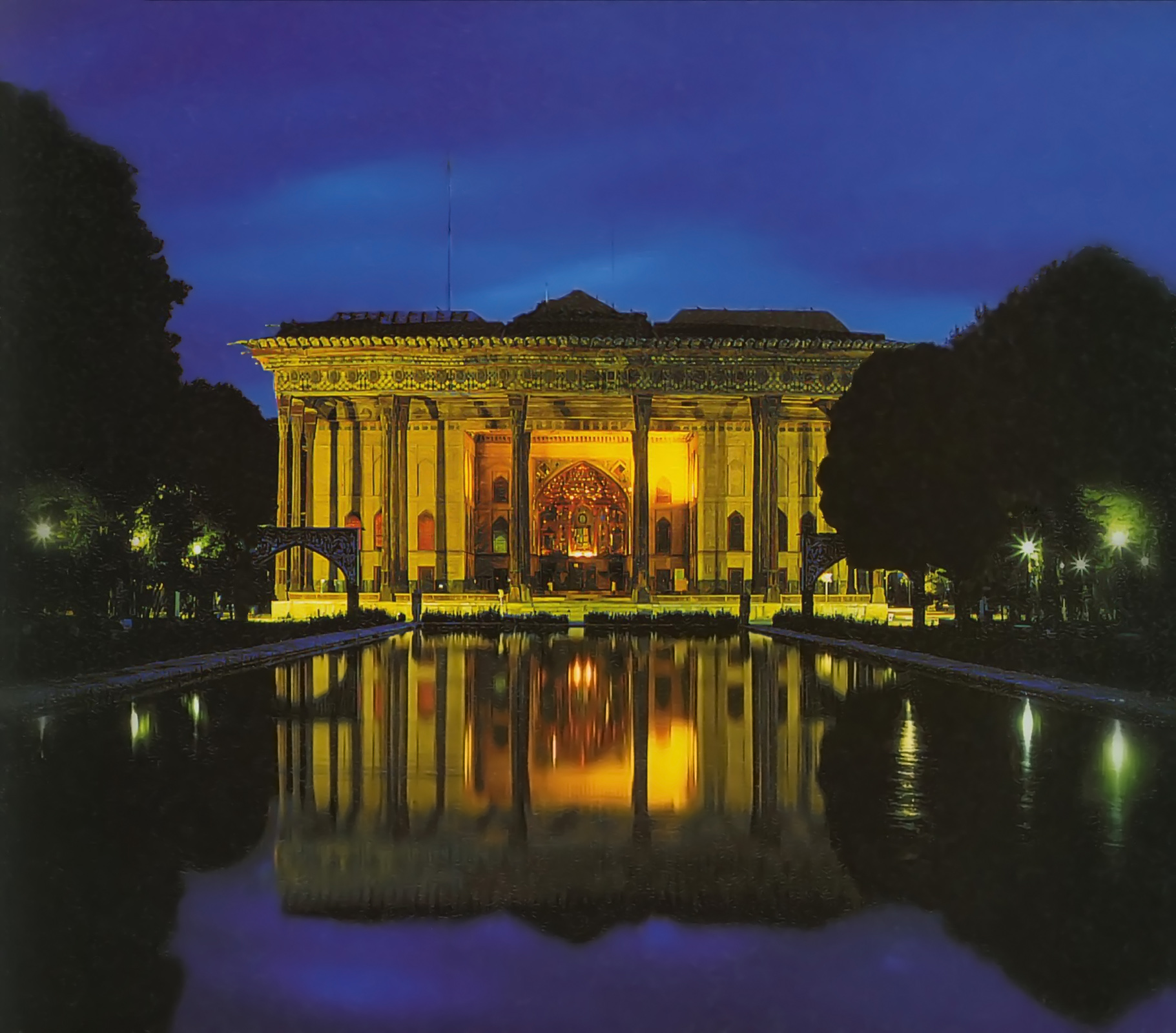
Chehel Sotoun Palace in Isfahan, built during the Safavid Empire with example of a talar, World Heritage Site

The history of architecture in Iran dates back to at least 5,000 BC, with characteristic examples distributed over an area from what is now Turkey and Iraq to Uzbekistan and Tajikistan, and from the Caucasus to Zanzibar. The Iranians made early use of mathematics, geometry and astronomy in their architecture, yielding a tradition with structural and aesthetic variety. The guiding motif is its cosmic symbolism.

In addition to historic gates, palaces, and mosques, the rapid growth of cities such as Tehran has brought a wave of construction. Iran ranks 7th among UNESCO's list of countries with the most archaeological ruins and attractions from antiquity.

=== World Heritage Sites ===
Iran's rich culture and history is reflected by its 29 World Heritage Sites, ranking 1st in the Middle East, and 10th in the world. These include Persepolis, Naghsh-e Jahan Square, Chogha Zanbil, Pasargadae, Golestan Palace, Arg-e Bam, Behistun Inscription, Shahr-e Sukhteh, Susa, Takht-e Soleyman, Hyrcanian forests, the city of Yazd and more. Iran has 26 Intangible cultural heritage, or Human treasures, which ranks 4th worldwide.

=== Weaving ===
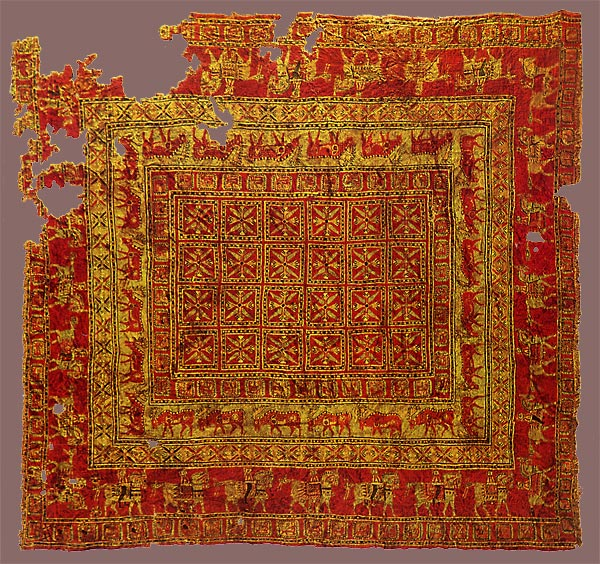
The Pazyryk Carpet, c. 400 BC, is considered world's the oldest known surviving carpet

Iran's carpet-weaving has its origins in the Bronze Age and is one of the most distinguished manifestations of Iranian art. Carpet weaving is an essential part of Persian culture and Iranian art. Persian rugs and carpets were woven in parallel by nomadic tribes in village and town workshops, and by royal court manufactories. As such, they represent simultaneous lines of tradition, and reflect the history of Iran, Persian culture, and its various peoples. Although the term "Persian carpet" most often refers to pile-woven textiles, flat-woven carpets and rugs like Kilim, Soumak, and embroidered tissues like Suzani are part of the manifold tradition of Persian carpet weaving.

Iran produces three-quarters of the world's handmade carpets, and has 30% of export markets. In 2010, the "traditional skills of carpet weaving" in Fars province and Kashan were inscribed to the UNESCO Intangible Cultural Heritage List. Within the Oriental rugs produced by the countries of the "rug belt", the Persian carpet stands out by the variety and elaborateness of its manifold designs.

Carpets woven in towns and regional centers like Tabriz, Kerman, Ravar, Neyshabour, Mashhad, Kashan, Isfahan, Nain and Qom are characterized by their specific weaving techniques and use of high-quality materials, colours and patterns. Hand-woven Persian rugs and carpets have been regarded as objects of high artistic value and prestige, since they were mentioned by ancient Greek writers.

=== Literature ===
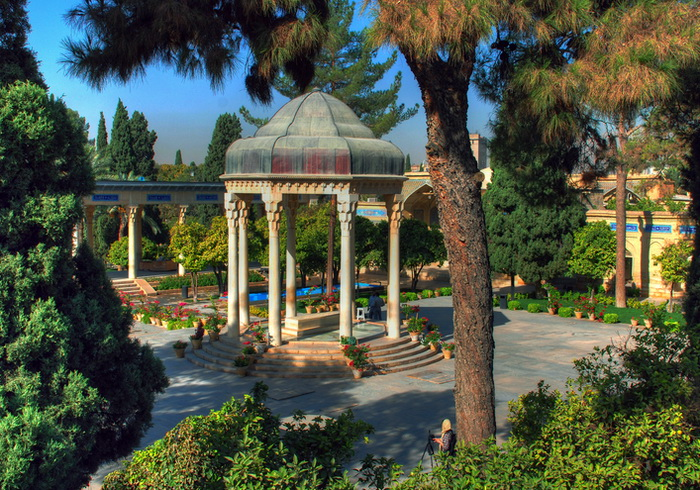
Tombs of Hafez

Iran's oldest literary tradition is that of Avestan, the Old Iranian sacred language of the Avesta, which consists of the legendary and religious texts of Zoroastrianism and the ancient Iranian religion. The Persian language was used and developed through Persianate societies in Asia Minor, Central Asia, and South Asia, leaving extensive influences on Ottoman and Mughal literatures, among others. Iran has several famous medieval poets, notably Rumi, Ferdowsi, Hafez, Saadi Shirazi, Omar Khayyam, and Nizami Ganjavi.

Described as one of the great literatures of humanity, including Goethe's assessment of it as one of the four main bodies of world literature, Persian literature has its roots in surviving works of Middle Persian and Old Persian, the latter of which dates back as far as 522 BC, the date of the earliest surviving Achaemenid inscription, the Behistun Inscription. The bulk of surviving Persian literature, however, comes from the times following the Muslim conquest in c. 650 AD. After the Abbasids came to power (750 AD), the Iranians became the scribes and bureaucrats of the Islamic Caliphate and, increasingly, also its writers and poets. The New Persian language literature arose and flourished in Khorasan and Transoxiana because of political reasons, early Iranian dynasties of post-Islamic Iran, such as the Tahirids and Samanids, being based in Khorasan.

=== Museums ===
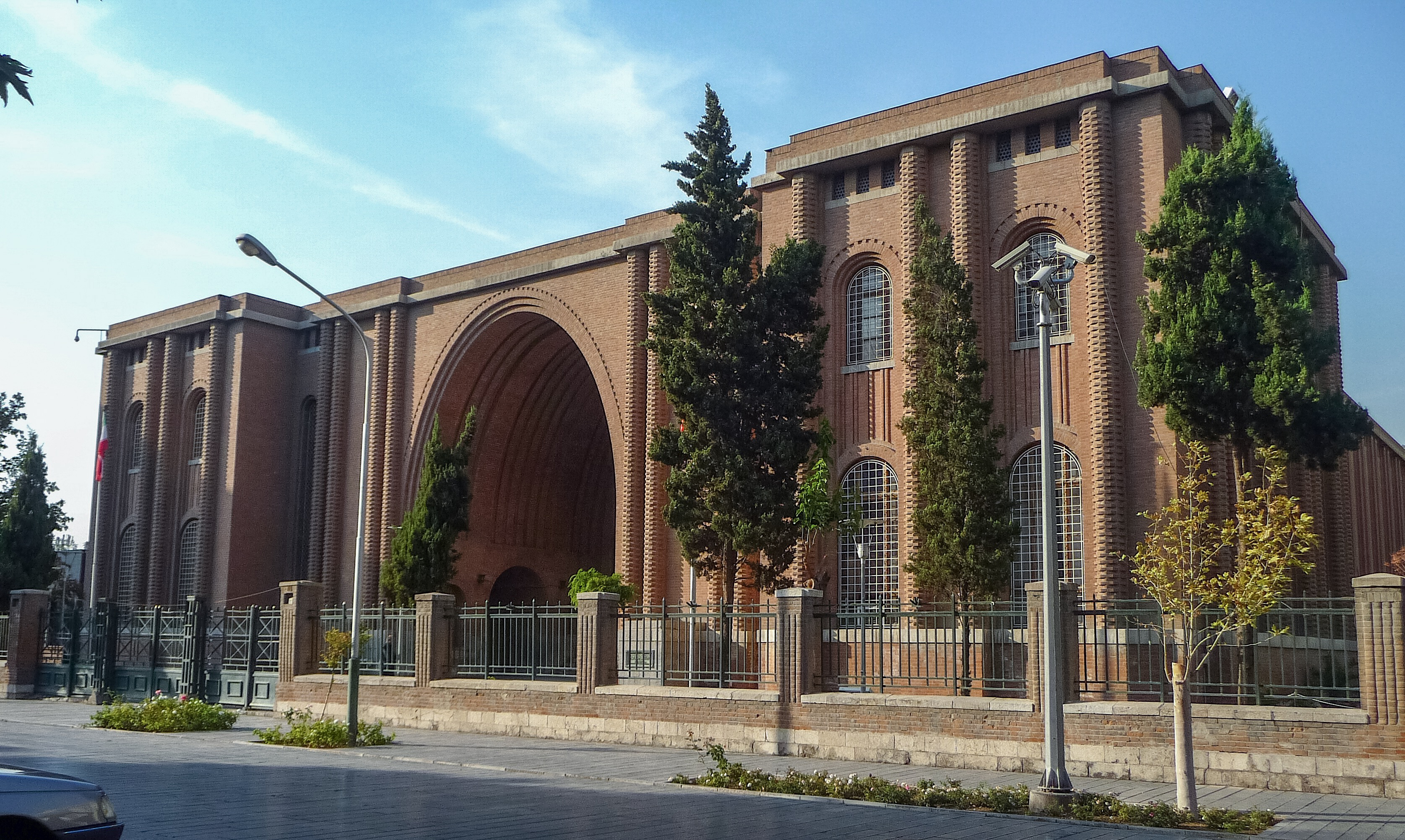
The National Museum of Iran in Tehran

The National Museum of Iran in Tehran is the country's most important cultural institution. As the first and biggest museum in Iran, the institution includes the Museum of Ancient Iran and the Museum of the Islamic Era. The National Museum is the world's most important museum in terms of preservation, display and research of archaeological collections of Iran, and ranks as one of the few most prestigious museums globally in terms of volume, diversity and quality of its monuments.

There are many other popular museums across the country such as the Golestan Palace (World Heritage Site), The Treasury of National Jewels, Reza Abbasi Museum, Tehran Museum of Contemporary Art, Sa'dabad Complex, The Carpet Museum, Abgineh Museum, Pars Museum, Azerbaijan Museum, Hegmataneh Museum, Susa Museum and more. Around 25 million people visited the museums in 2019.

=== Music and dance ===
Iran is the apparent birthplace of the earliest complex instruments, dating to the 3rd millennium BC. The use of angular harps have been documented at Madaktu and Kul-e Farah, with the largest collection of Elamite instruments documented at Kul-e Farah. Xenophon's Cyropaedia mentions singing women at the court of the Achaemenid Empire. Under the Parthian Empire, the gōsān (Parthian for 'minstrel') had a prominent role.

The history of Sasanian music is better documented than earlier periods and is especially more evident in Avestan texts. By the time of Khosrow II, the Sasanian royal court hosted prominent musicians, namely Azad, Bamshad, Barbad, Nagisa, Ramtin, and Sarkash. Iranian traditional musical instruments include string instruments such as chang (harp), qanun, santur, rud (oud, barbat), tar, dotar, setar, tanbur, and kamanche, wind instruments such as sorna (zurna, karna) and ney, and percussion instruments such as tompak, kus, daf (dayere), and naqare.

The Tehran Symphony Orchestra was founded in 1933. By the late 1940s, Ruhollah Khaleqi founded the country's first national music society and established the School of National Music in 1949. Iranian pop music has its origins in the Qajar era. It was significantly developed since the 1950s, using indigenous instruments and forms accompanied by electric guitar and other imported characteristics. Iranian rock emerged in the 1960s and hip hop in the 2000s.

Iran has known dance in the forms of music, play, drama or religious rituals since at least the 6th millennium BC. Artifacts with pictures of dancers were found in archaeological prehistoric sites. Genres of dance vary depending on the area, culture, and language of the local people, and can range from sophisticated reconstructions of refined court dances to energetic folk dances. Each group, region, and historical epoch has specific dance styles associated with it. The earliest researched dance from historic Iran is a dance worshipping Mithra. Ancient Persian dance was significantly researched by Greek historian Herodotus. Iran was occupied by foreign powers, causing a slow disappearance of heritage dance traditions.

The Qajar era had an important influence on Persian dance. In this period, a style of dance began to be called "classical Persian dance". Dancers performed artistic dances in court for entertainment purposes such as coronations, marriage celebrations, and Norouz celebrations. In the 20th century, the music came to be orchestrated and dance movement and costuming gained a modernistic orientation to the West.

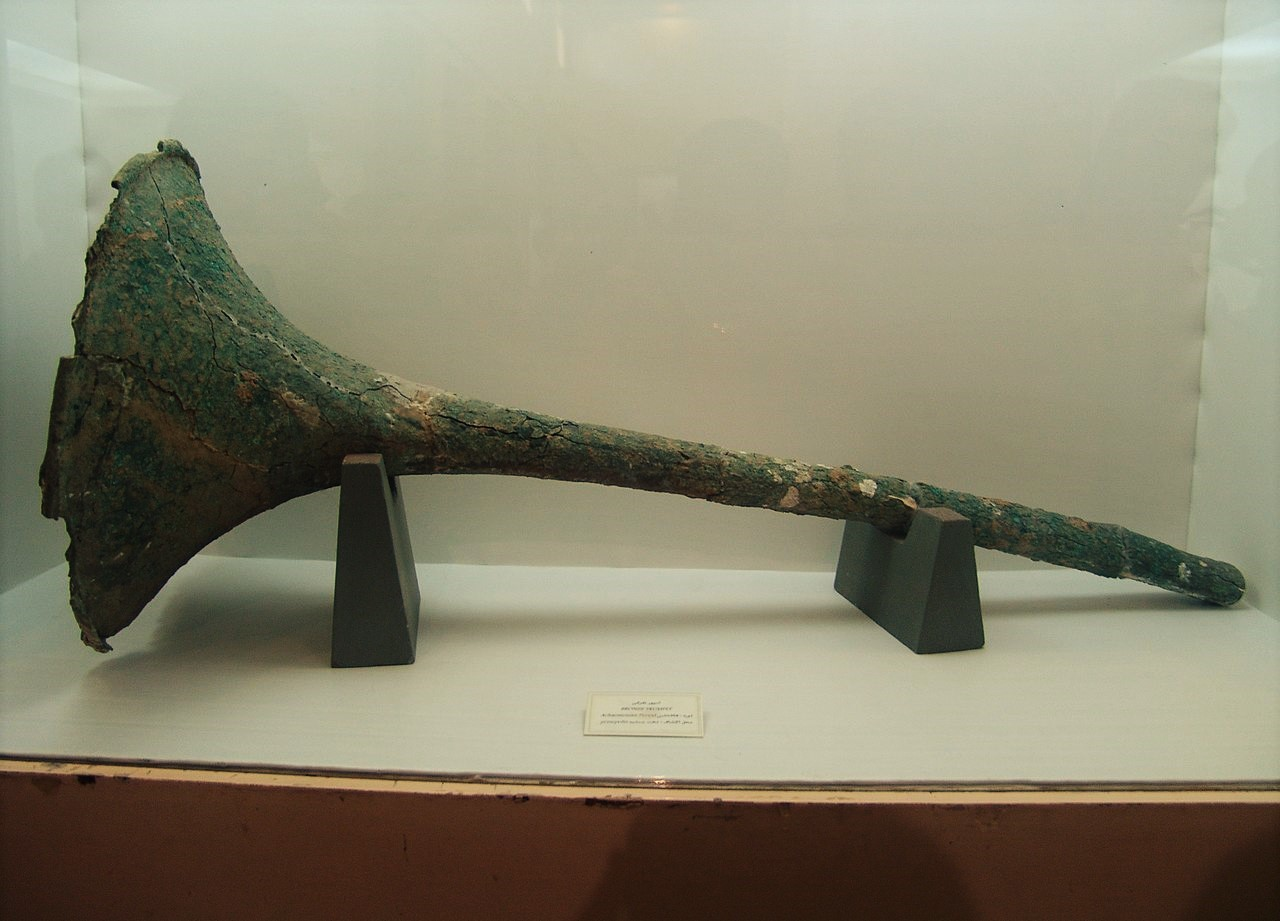
A karnay, an ancient Iranian musical instrument from the 6th century BC, kept at the Persepolis Museum

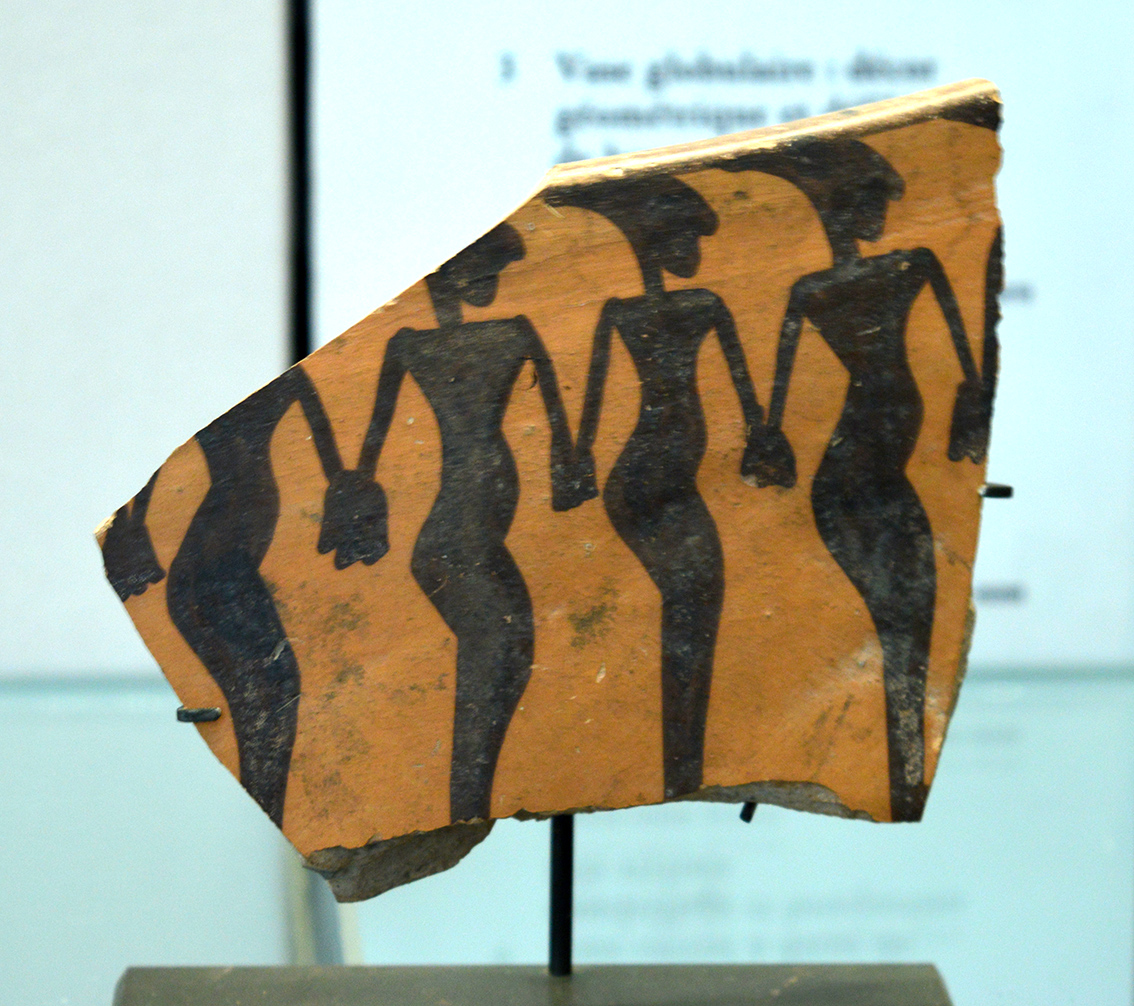
Dancers on a piece of ceramic from Cheshmeh-Ali, 5000 BC

=== Media ===
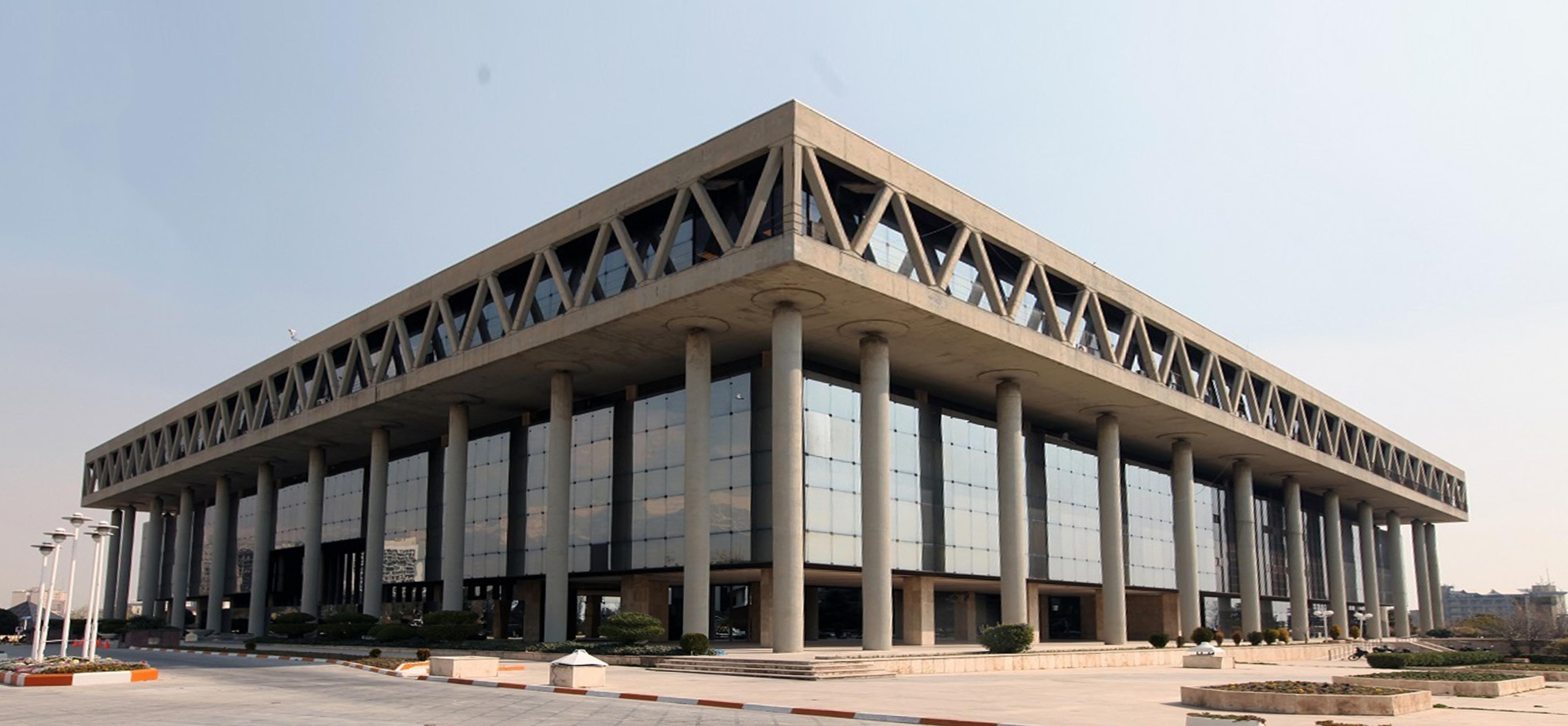
IRIB, the Iranian state-controlled media corporation

Iran's largest media corporation is the state-owned IRIB. The Ministry of Culture and Islamic Guidance is responsible for the cultural policy, including activities regarding communications and information. Most of the newspapers published in Iran are in Persian, the country's official and national language. The country's most widely circulated periodicals are based in Tehran, among which are Etemad, Ettela'at, Kayhan, Hamshahri, Resalat, and Shargh. Tehran Times, Iran Daily, and Financial Tribune are among the famous English-language newspapers based in Iran.

Iran ranks 17th among countries by number of Internet users. Google Search is Iran's most widely used search engine and Instagram is the most popular online social networking service. Direct access to many worldwide mainstream websites has been blocked in Iran, including Facebook, which has been blocked since 2009. About 90% of Iran's e-commerce takes place on the Iranian online store Digikala, which has around 750,000 visitors per day and is the most visited online store in the Middle East.

Arrests of journalists critical of the government have increased since 2022 according to Reporters Without Borders.

=== Cuisine ===
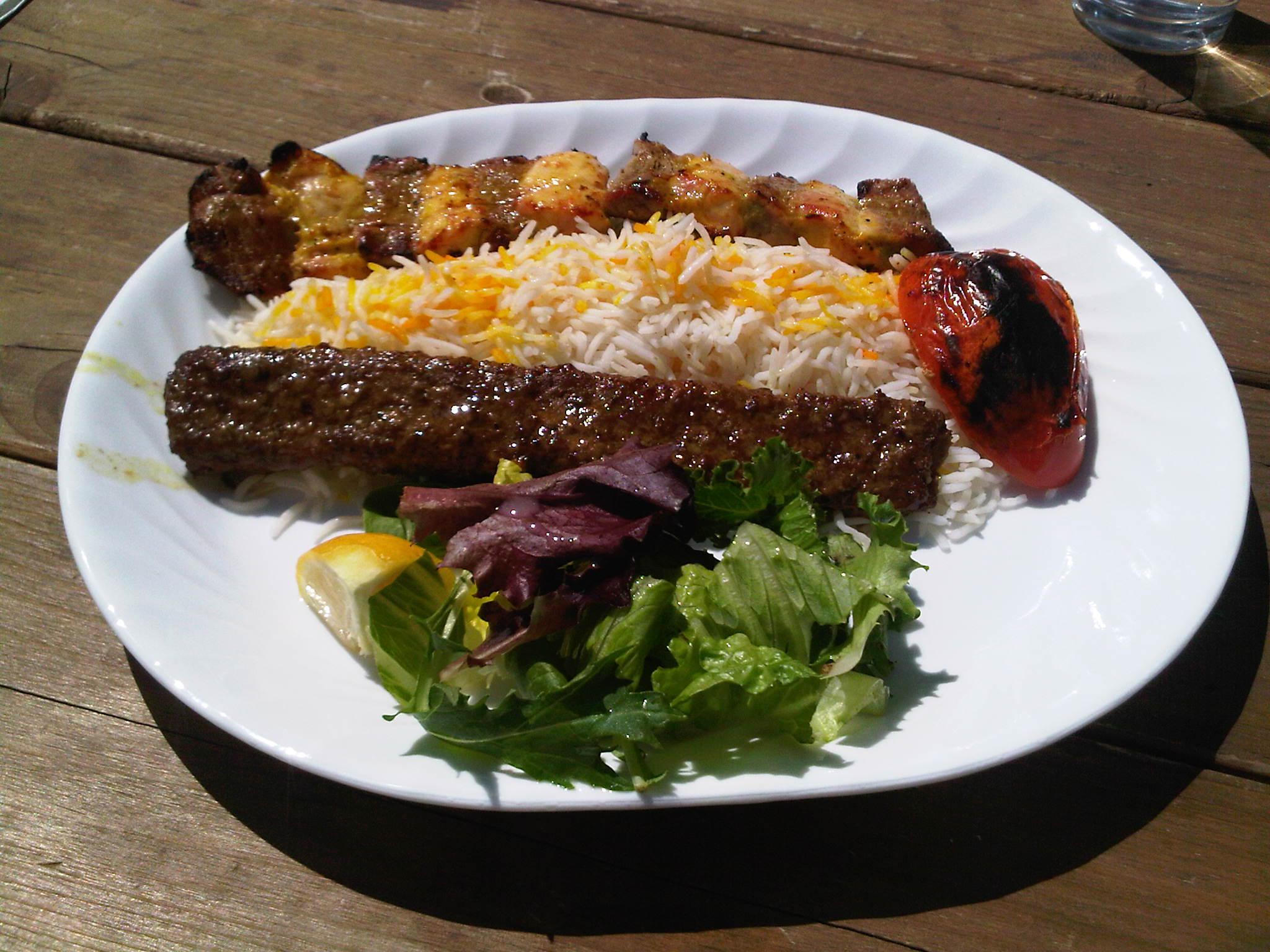
Chelow kabab (rice and kebab), one of Iran's national dishes

Iranian main dishes include varieties of kebab, pilaf, stew (khoresh), soup and āsh, and omelette. Lunch and dinner meals are commonly accompanied by side dishes such as plain yogurt or mast-o-khiar, sabzi, salad Shirazi, and torshi, and might follow dishes such as borani, Mirza Qasemi, or kashk e bademjan. In Iranian culture, tea is widely consumed. Iran is the world's seventh major tea producer. One of Iran's most popular desserts is the falude. There is also the popular saffron ice cream, known as Bastani Sonnati ("traditional ice cream"), which is sometimes accompanied with carrot juice. Iran is also famous for its caviar.

Typical Iranian main dishes are combinations of rice with meat, vegetables and nuts. Herbs are frequently used, along with fruits such as plums, pomegranates, quince, prunes, apricots and raisins. Characteristic Iranian spices and flavourings such as saffron, cardamom, and dried lime and other sources of sour flavoring, cinnamon, turmeric and parsley are mixed and used in various dishes.

=== Sports ===
Iran is the birthplace of polo, locally known as chogan, with its earliest records attributed to the ancient Medes. Freestyle wrestling is traditionally considered the national sport, and Iran's wrestlers have been world champions many times. Iran's traditional wrestling, called koڑti e pahlevāni ("heroic wrestling"), is registered on UNESCO's Intangible Cultural Heritage list. Iran's National Olympic Committee was founded in 1947. Wrestlers and weightlifters have achieved the country's highest records at the Olympics. In 1974, Iran became the first country in West Asia to host the Asian Games.

As a mountainous country, Iran is a venue for skiing, snowboarding, hiking, rock climbing, and mountain climbing. It is home to ski resorts, the most famous being Tochal, Dizin, and Shemshak. Dizin is the largest, and authorized by FIS to administer international competitions.

Football is the most popular sport, with the men's national team having won the Asian Cup three times. The men's team ranks 2nd in Asia and 18th in the FIFA World Rankings as of April 2025. The Azadi Stadium in Tehran is the largest association football stadium in West Asia and on a list of top-20 stadiums in the world. Volleyball is the second most popular sport. Having won the 2011 and 2013 Asian Men's Volleyball Championships, the men's national team is the 2nd strongest in Asia, and 15th in the FIVB World Rankings as of January 2025. Basketball is also popular, with the men's national team having won three Asian Championships since 2007.

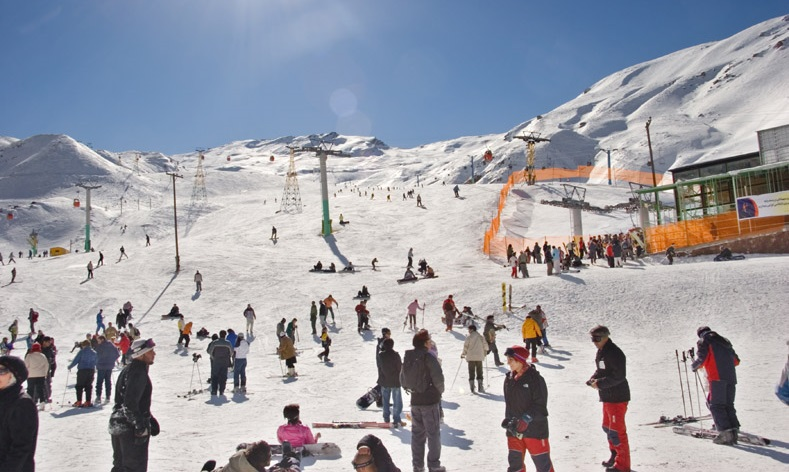
Dizin, biggest ski resort in the Middle East

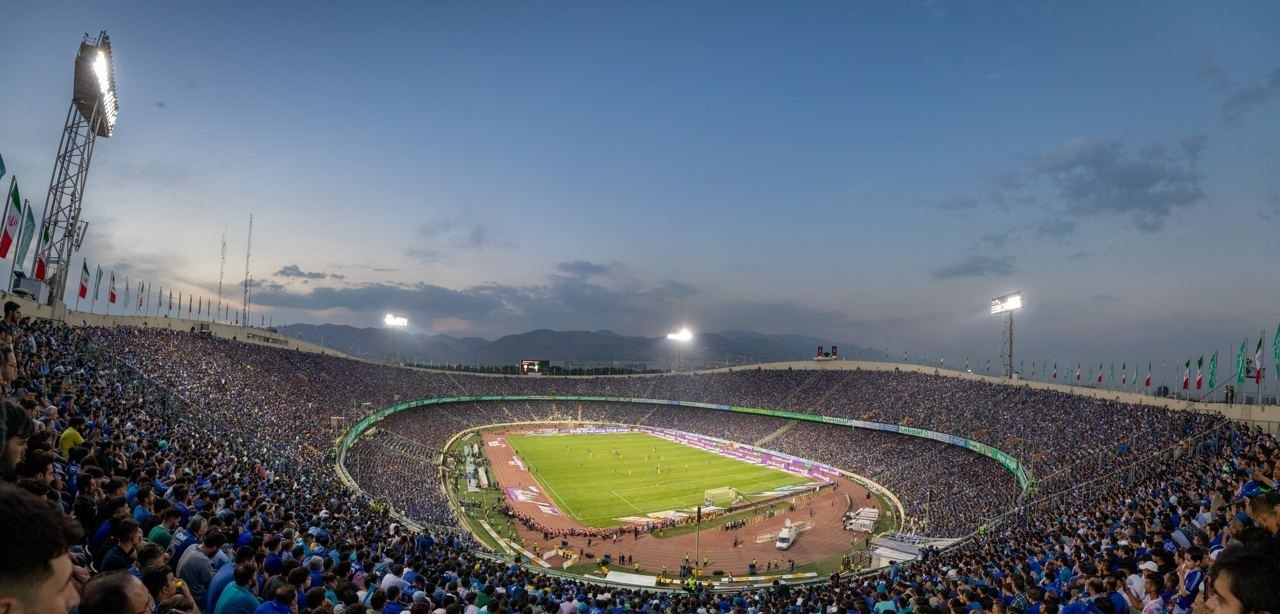
Azadi Stadium in Tehran, West Asia's largest football stadium

== See also ==
- Outline of Iran

== Bibliography ==
=== Encyclopaedia Iranica ===
- Amanat, Abbas (2002). "Great Britain iii. British influence in Persia in the 19th century". In Yarshater, Ehsan (ed.). Encyclopædia Iranica (Online ed.). Encyclopædia Iranica Foundation.
- Bosworth, C. Edmund (1986). "Anūštigin Ḡarčaʾī". In Yarshater, Ehsan (ed.). Encyclopædia Iranica (Online ed.). Encyclopædia Iranica Foundation.
- Bosworth, C. Edmund (2009). "Khwarazmshahs i. Descendants of the line of Anuštigin". In Yarshater, Ehsan (ed.). Encyclopædia Iranica (Online ed.). Encyclopædia Iranica Foundation.
- Lawergren, Bo (2009). "Music History i. Pre-Islamic Iran". In Yarshater, Ehsan (ed.). Encyclopædia Iranica. Encyclopædia Iranica (Online ed.). Encyclopædia Iranica Foundation.
- Lecoq, P. (2011). "Aparna". In Yarshater, Ehsan (ed.). Encyclopædia Iranica (Online ed.). Encyclopædia Iranica Foundation.
- Gyselen, Ryka (1997). "Economy iv. In the Sasanian Period". In Yarshater, Ehsan (ed.). Encyclopædia Iranica (Online ed.). Encyclopædia Iranica Foundation.
- MacKenzie, David Niel (1998). "Ērān, Ērānšahr". In Yarshater, Ehsan (ed.). Encyclopædia Iranica (Online ed.). Encyclopædia Iranica Foundation.
- Matthee, Rudolph P. (2008). "Safavid Dynasty". In Yarshater, Ehsan (ed.). Encyclopædia Iranica (Online ed.). Encyclopædia Iranica Foundation.
- Perry, J. R. (1984). "Āgā Mohammad Khan Qājār". In Yarshater, Ehsan (ed.). Encyclopædia Iranica (Online ed.). Encyclopædia Iranica Foundation.
- Perry, J. R. (2000). "Zand Dynasty". In Yarshater, Ehsan (ed.). Encyclopædia Iranica (Online ed.). Encyclopædia Iranica Foundation.
- Savory, Roger; Karamustafa, Ahmet T. (1998). "Esmāʿīl I Ṣafawī". In Yarshater, Ehsan (ed.). Encyclopædia Iranica (Online ed.). Encyclopædia Iranica Foundation.
- Schmitt, Rüdiger (1987). "Aryans". In Yarshater, Ehsan (ed.). Encyclopædia Iranica. Encyclopedia Iranica (Online ed.). New York: Encyclopædia Iranica Foundation.
- Shahbazi, Alireza Shapour (2004). "Iraj". In Yarshater, Ehsan (ed.). Encyclopædia Iranica. Encyclopaedia Iranica (Online ed.). Encyclopædia Iranica Foundation.
- Shahbazi, Alireza Shapur (2005). "Sasanian Dynasty". In Yarshater, Ehsan (ed.). Encyclopædia Iranica (Online ed.). Encyclopædia Iranica Foundation.
- Tucker, Ernest (2006a). "Nāder Shāh". Encyclopaedia Iranica.
- Yarshater, Ehsan (2004). "Iran ii. Iranian History (1) Pre-Islamic Times". In Yarshater, Ehsan (ed.). Encyclopædia Iranica (Online ed.). Encyclopædia Iranica Foundation.

=== Books ===
- Aeschylus (2009) [1981]. "Persians". The Complete Aeschylus: Volume II: Persians and Other Plays. Translated by Lembke, Janet; Herington, C. John. Oxford University Press. ISBN 978-0-19-045183-7.
- Aghaie, Kamran Scot (2012). "The Afghan Interlude and the Zand and Afshar Dynasties (1722–95)". The Oxford Handbook of Iranian History. Oxford University Press. ISBN 978-0-19-973215-9.
- Aigle, Denise (2024). Iran Under the Mongols: Ilkhanid Administrators and Persian Notables in Fars. I.B. Tauris. ISBN 978-0-7556-4573-2.
- Axworthy, Michael (2008). A History of Iran: Empire of the Mind. Basic Books. ISBN 978-0-465-09876-7.
- Baker, Patricia L. (2005) [2001]. Iran: The Bradt Travel Guide. Bradt Travel Guides. ISBN 978-1-84162-123-4.
- Barthold, V. V. (1962). Four Studies on the History of Central Asia: Volume III: Mir Ali-Shir: A History of the Turkman People. Brill.
- Blair, Sheila (1992). The Monumental Inscriptions from Early Islamic Iran and Transoxiana. Brill. ISBN 90-04-09367-2.
- Brown, Brad (2011). "Ismail, Shah (Safavid) (1487–1524)". In Mikaberidze, Alexander (ed.). Conflict and Conquest in the Islamic World: A Historical Encyclopedia. Vol. 1. ABC-CLIO. ISBN 978-1-59884-336-1.
- Buzan, Barry; Wæver, Ole (2003), Regions and Powers: The Structure of International Security, Cambridge: Cambridge University Press, p. 55, ISBN 978-0-521-89111-0
- Dowling, Timothy C. (2014). Russia at War: From the Mongol Conquest to Afghanistan, Chechnya, and Beyond. 2 volumes. ABC-CLIO. ISBN 978-1-59884-948-6.
- El-Azhari, Taef (2019). "The Seljuqs from Syria to Iran: The Age of Khatuns and Atabegs". Queens, Eunuchs and Concubines in Islamic History, 661–1257. Edinburg University Press. pp. 285–348. doi:10.3366/edinburgh/9781474423182.003.0007. ISBN 978-1-4744-2318-2. S2CID 219872073.
- Elling, Rasmus Christian (2013). Minorities in Iran: Nationalism and Ethnicity after Khomeini. Springer. ISBN 978-1-137-04780-9.
- Eiland, Murray (2004). "West Asia, 300 BC–AD 600". In Onians, John (ed.). Atlas of World Art. Oxford University Press. ISBN 978-0-19-521583-0.
- Ehteshami, Anoushiravan (2017). "Modern state formation". Iran: Stuck in Transition. Routledge. ISBN 978-1-351-98545-1.
- Gaube, Heinz (2008). "Iranian Cities". The City in the Islamic World: Volume 2. Brill. ISBN 978-90-47-44265-3.
- Golden, Peter B. (2011). Central Asia in World History. Oxford University Press.
- Dandamayev, Muhammad (2021). "Eastern Europe". A Companion to the Achaemenid Persian Empire: Volume II. Wiley-Blackwell. ISBN 978-1-119-07165-5.
- Hawting, G. R. (1986). The First Dynasty of Islam: The Umayyad Caliphate, AD 661–750. Croom Helm Ltd.
- Hamzeh'ee, M. Reza (1990). The Yaresan: a Sociological, Historical, and Religio-Historical Study of a Kurdish Community. Berlin: K. Schwarz. ISBN 3-922968-83-X. OCLC 23438701.
- Lane, George E. (2012). "The Mongols in Iran". The Oxford Handbook of Iranian History. Oxford University Press. ISBN 978-0-19-973215-9.
- Katouzian, Homa (2013). Iran: Politics, History and Literature. Routledge. ISBN 978-0-415-63689-6.
- Lorentz, John H. (2007). The A to Z of Iran. Scarecrow Press. ISBN 978-0-8108-7638-5.
- Mahendrarajah, Shivan (2019). "The Iranian Interlude: From Mongol Decline to Timur's Invasion". Iran after the Mongols. Bloomsbury. ISBN 9781786725974.
- Malekzadeh, Elham (2018). "A Narrative of Historical and Cultural Ties Between Iran and Romania". In Whiskin, Margaux (ed.). Iran and the West: Cultural Perceptions from the Sasanian Empire to the Islamic Republic. I.B. Tauris. ISBN 978-1-83860-876-7.
- Matthews, Roger; Nashli, Hassan Fazeli (2022). The Archaeology of Iran from the Palaeolithic to the Achaemenid Empire. Routledge. doi:10.4324/9781003224129. ISBN 978-1-003-22412-9.
- Middleton, John (2015). World Monarchies and Dynasties. Routledge. ISBN 978-0-7656-8050-1.
- Osman, Khalil (2014). Sectarianism in Iraq: The Making of State and Nation Since 1920. Taylor & Francis. ISBN 978-1-138-77946-4.
- Roisman, Joseph; Worthington, Ian (2011). A Companion to Ancient Macedonia. John Wiley and Sons. ISBN 978-1-4443-5163-7.
- Ross, Martha (1977). Rulers and Governments of the World: Volume 1: Earliest Times to 1491. Bowker. ISBN 0-85935-021-5.
- Rossabi, Morris (2002). "The Mongols and Their Legacy". The Legacy of Genghis Khan: Courtly Art and Culture in Western Asia, 1256–1353. The Metropolitan Museum of Art. ISBN 1-58839-071-3.
- Pourshariati, Parvaneh (2008). Decline and Fall of the Sasanian Empire: The Sasanian–Parthian Confederacy and the Arab Conquest of Iran. I.B. Tauris. ISBN 978-1-84511-645-3.
- Shenkar, Michael (2014). Intangible Spirits and Graven Images: The Iconography of Deities in the Pre-Islamic Iranian World. Brill. ISBN 978-90-04-28148-6.
- Strootman, Rolf (2020). "The Great Kings of Asia: Imperial Titulature in the Seleukid and Post-Seleukid Middle East". New Perspectives in Seleucid History, Archaeology and Numismatics: Studies in Honor of Getzel M. Cohen. Walter de Gruyter GmbH. ISBN 978-3-11-028378-5.
- Temperman, Jeroen (2010). "State Support & State Acknowledgement of Religion". State-Religion Relationships and Human Rights Law: Towards a Right to Religiously Neutral Governance. Brill. ISBN 978-90-04-18148-9.
- Sicker, Martin (2000). The Pre-Islamic Middle East. Greenwood Publishing Group. ISBN 978-0-275-96890-8.
- Osanloo, Arzoo (2009). "Human Rights: The Politics and Prose of Discursive Sites". The Politics of Women's Rights in Iran. Princeton University Press. ISBN 978-0-691-13546-5.
- Tohidi, Nayareh (2009). "Ethnicity and Religious Minority Politics in Iran". In Gheissari, Ali (ed.). Contemporary Iran: Economy, Society, Politics. Oxford University Press. ISBN 978-0-19-537849-8.
- Venning, Timothy (2023). A Compendium of World Sovereigns: Volume I Ancient. Routledge. ISBN 978-1-032-36194-9.
- Ward, Steven R. (2009). Immortal: A Military History of Iran and its Armed Forces. Georgetown University Press. ISBN 978-1-58901-587-6.

=== Other sources ===
- United States (2011). "Iran". The World Factbook 2011. Central Intelligence Agency. ISBN 978-0-16-089365-0.
