= Ethnic Identity and the State in Iran =

2013 book by Alam Saleh

- Author: Alam Saleh
- Language: English
- Subject: Iranian politics
- Publisher: Palgrave Macmillan
- Publication date: July 2013
- Media type: Print
- Pages: 233 pp.
- ISBN: 978-1-349-45676-5

Ethnic Identity and the State in Iran is a 2013 book by Alam Saleh in which the author examines inter-ethnic tension and the politicization of ethnic identity in Iran. He suggests that problems with ethnicity and nationality in Iran, as in other countries of the Middle East, has not been so much the result of ethnic identity formation, but the product of the securitization of ethnic issues. The book has received positive reviews in the Middle East Journal, Review of Middle East Studies, Iranian Studies, the British Journal of Middle Eastern Studies, and Nations and Nationalism.

== Author ==
Alam Saleh (born 1975) is a British-Iranian political scientist and a senior lecturer in Iranian Studies at the Australian National University's Centre for Arab & Islamic Studies. He received his PhD from the University of Leeds with a thesis titled Identity and Societal Security in Iran (2010) and has previously taught at Lancaster University, Durham University, University of Exeter, University of Leeds, and Bradford University. Saleh is a fellow of Higher Education Academy and has published in several international journals.

== Synopsis ==
=== Structure ===
Some of the material in the book was adapted from articles the author published previously in International Geopolitics Quarterly and Sfera Politicii. The book consists of seven chapters. The first two chapters offer an overview of the main theoretical frameworks on which the author's fieldwork is based. In the next two chapters, Saleh examines the Iranian case. The main part of the research, i.e. chapters 5–7, explores ethnic minorities and the Iranian government's reaction to the presumed threat shaped by these minorities and provides a detailed account of the situation of these identity groups and their interaction with the government.

=== Theoretical framework ===
Ethnic Identity and the State in Iran examines the position of ethnic minorities in Iran and their impact on the country's politics, security discourses, and wider societal trends. The book uses a framework that combines work by the Copenhagen School of Security Studies and the literature on ethnic conflict to provide insights into the identity and sense of discrimination and deprivation felt by the major ethnic groups of Iran, namely: the Azeris, Kurds, Arabs, Baluchis, and Turkmens. In so doing, the book uses political science methodologies to explore the roots of Iran's current political and societal issues—not just those that affect the minorities but those that directly impact wider political decision-making and public life at every level of society.

Saleh uses the popular theories of securitisation such as those of Ted Gurr, Barry Buzan, Ole Waever, Charles Tilly and Benedict Anderson to offer a detailed explanation of the challenges faced by Iran's ethnic minorities in their interaction with the state and also the state's justifications in its practices to create a unified identity for Iran.

=== Methodology ===
The research used a qualitative methodology in examining the subject and in doing the fieldwork and is based on the data collected through intensive individual and focus group interviews during three months of fieldwork (July – September 2009, soon after Iranian presidential election) in Iran as well as among Iranians residing in Europe. The interviewees were from five major ethnic groups and social backgrounds and also Persians in various cities. 45 interviews with 53 individuals (21 women and 32 men) were carried out and transcribed. Apart from semi-structured interviews, some data were collected based on other methods like fieldnotes, audiovisual recordings, images, documents, random interviews in public, focus groups, private interviews, and newspaper and journal articles. Additional data was gathered from direct observations.

== Reception ==
The book has been reviewed in the Middle East Journal by Nader Entessar, in the Review of Middle East Studies by Dale Hiles, in the British Journal of Middle Eastern Studies by Simon Mabon, in Iranian Studies by Rasmus Christian Elling, and in Nations and Nationalism by Farzin Farzad.

Entessar calls the book "a welcome addition" to the works about the developing problems of ethnicity in the Middle East. Hiles, a professor at Virginia Tech, believes that Saleh calls for an alternative de-securitized approach to the relationship between nationality and ethnicity, one which accepts ethnic identities while improving policies for cohesion and solidarity, not exclusion, for the sake of Iran's national security. Mabon, of Lancaster University, criticizes the book for dealing briefly with the discussion of narratives of Persian nationalism (chapter 3). He nevertheless calls the book "a commanding work" and "a must read", however, for the scholars interested in the geopolitical elements of the Middle East and Iranian government's role in the region. Elling posed some questions to Saleh after providing a short review of the book and in turn answered some questions by Saleh about his own book Minorities in Iran: Nationalism and Ethnicity after Khomeini.

Farzad, affiliated with ADA University, argues that the book is an appropriate introductory text for the scholars interested in studying the security threats shaped by ethnicities and the homogenization policies in culture and language in Iran, being the "first of its kind" to use western theoretical perspectives of identity formation and nationalism to the identity issues in Iran and their relation to security. Nevertheless, Farzad argues that there are some other key aspects lacking in the book which can be conducive to understanding the roots of ethnic challenges within the state.

The main weakness of the book, Farzad states, is that Saleh does not survey history to the extent that one of the essential roots of ethnic tension, i.e. the very concept of Iran as nation-state, is discovered and thought upon. Farzad contends that the idea of nation-state was a totally external concept, inappropriate for organizing and uniting the country and causing numerous coercive efforts and revisionist education in a multiethnic country. Then Saleh, as Farzad assumes, could not properly assess the concept of Iran "as an imagined community" before and during foundation in the 1920s. Saleh's narrative, therefore, nurtures a "singular Persian ethnic identity" and fails to consider its "multi-ethnic historical narrative.", in Farzad's opinion.

== See also ==
- Arab separatism in Khuzestan
- Kurdish separatism in Iran
