= Security Dialogue =

- Discipline: International relations
- Language: English
- Edited by: Mark B. Salter

Publication details
- Former name: Bulletin of Peace Proposals
- History: 1970-present
- Publisher: SAGE Publications on behalf of the Peace Research Institute Oslo
- Frequency: Bimonthly
- Impact factor: 3.459 (2020)

Standard abbreviations
- ISO 4: Secur. Dialogue

Indexing
- CODEN: SDIAER
- ISSN: 0967-0106 (print); 1460-3640 (web)
- LCCN: 92648248
- OCLC no.: 26717433

Links
- Journal homepage; Online access

Security Dialogue is a peer-reviewed academic journal that publishes scholarly articles which combine contemporary theoretical analysis with challenges to public policy across a wide-ranging field of security studies. The journal is owned by the Peace Research Institute Oslo which also hosts the editorial office. As of 1 October 2015 Mark B. Salter (University of Ottawa) is the editor-in-chief. Marit Moe-Pryce has been the managing editor of the journal since 2004. Current associate editors are Emily Gilbert (University of Toronto), Jairus V. Grove (University of Hawaiʻi at Mānoa), Jana Hönke (University of Bayreuth), Doerthe Rosenow (Oxford Brookes), Anna Stavrianakis (University of Sussex), and Maria Stern (University of Gothenburg).

Security Dialogue went through a significant change in scope under the editorship of J. Peter Burgess, and this has seen the journal climbing on international rankings to become one of the leading journals in critical security studies. In addition to the flagship journal, Security Dialogue also runs a blog and podcast series.

== History ==
The journal was established by Marek Thee in 1970 under the name Bulletin of Peace Proposals. The aim was to systematically present, compare and discuss ideas, plans, and proposals for development, justice, and peace. The name of the journal was changed to Security Dialogue in September 1992. In the editorial introduction to the new journal title, then-editor Magne Barthe called for inter-regional dialogue on security issues, and for an internationalization of both scope and dissemination. In celebration of the journal's 50th anniversary in 2019, a longer piece on the journal's history was written by Michael Murphy.

== Critical Approaches to Security in Europe ==
One of the most-cited articles published in Security Dialogue is the manifesto of the C.A.S.E. Collective, which outlined the recent history of critical security studies in Europe and suggested directions forward. The C.A.S.E. Collective article traced the development of the different "schools" of European critical security studies from a sociological perspective, and was written by a group of junior and senior scholars, including: Claudia Aradau, Didier Bigo, Matti Jutila, Tara McCormack, Andrew Neal, Ole Wæver, and Michael C. Williams. Then-editor J. Peter Burgess recognized the controversy caused by the C.A.S.E. Collective approach, and Security Dialogue published a series of replies to the C.A.S.E. Collective article by R. B. J. Walker, Andreas Behnke, Mark B. Salter, and Christine Sylvester in response to the manifesto, as well as a response to the critics written again by the C.A.S.E. Collective.

== "Is Securitization Theory Racist?" controversy ==
In August 2019, Alison Howell and Melanie Richter-Montpetit published the research article "Is Securitization Theory Racist? Civilizationism, Methodological Whiteness, and Antiblack Thought in the Copenhagen School", arguing that "Copenhagen School securitization theory is structured not only by Eurocentrism but also by civilizationism, methodological whiteness, and antiblack racism." Although they specified that their argument was "not a personal indictment of any particular author", they extensively addressed the works of Barry Buzan and Ole Wæver, two central figures of the Copenhagen School. Buzan and Wæver replied to the article in May 2020, citing alleged errors in the article and arguing that the methodology and academic standards of Howell and Richter-Montpetit's article are "so profoundly and systematically flawed as to void the authors' argument", and thought that "the lack of credible supporting evidence makes their charge libellous."

== List of Editors ==
Since 1970, 49 volumes of Security Dialogue have been published by 6 editors, totalling 214 issues. Below is a summary of the tenures of the respective editors.

Editor	Tenure
Marek Thee	1970-1991
Magne Barth	1992-1996
Pavel Baev	1995-2001
J. Peter Burgess	2001-2013
Claudia Aradau	2013-2015
Mark B. Salter	2015–Present

== Abstracting and indexing ==
The journal is abstracted and indexed in:

- A Matter of Fact
- Abstracts of Military Bibliography
- Academic Search Premier
- Business Source Corporate
- CD-ROM - International Bibliography of Scholarly Literature in the Humanities and Social Sciences
- Current Contents/Social & Behavioral Sciences
- HRI Reporter
- International Bibliographies of Periodical Literature
- International Bibliography of the Social Sciences
- Information-Dokumentation
- Inforpaz
- International Bibliography of Book Reviews of Scholarly Literature in the Humanities and Social Sciences
- International Bibliography of the Social Sciences
- International Political Science Abstracts
- Lancaster Index To Defence and International Security Literature
- MasterFILE Premier
- Middle East Abstracts & Index
- Monthly Bibliography of the UN Library
- National Criminal Justice Reference Service
- National Institute for Research Advancement
- Nordske Tidsskriftartikler
- OCLC Public Affairs Information Service
- PAIS Bulletin
- Peace Research Abstracts
- Political Science Abstracts
- Political Science Index
- Public Administration Abstracts
- Refugee Abstracts
- Research Alert
- Risk Abstracts
- Science Direct Navigator
- Social SciSearch
- Social Sciences Citation Index
- Social Services Abstracts
- Sociofile
- Southeast Asia Abstracts & Index
- Violence & Abuse Abstracts
- Worldwide Political Sciences Abstracts

According to the Journal Citation Reports, the journal has a 2016 impact factor of 2.692, ranking it 6th out of 86 journals in the category "International Relations".
