= The European Security Order Recast =

The European Security Order Recast: Scenarios for the Post-Cold War Era
- Author: Barry Buzan, Morten Kelstrup, Pierre Lemaitre, Elzbieta Tromer and Ole Waever
- Genre: security studies
- Publication date: 1990

The European Security Order Recast: Scenarios for the Post-Cold War Era was a 1990 international relations book by Barry Buzan, Morten Kelstrup, Pierre Lemaitre, Elzbieta Tromer and Ole Waever. The book focused on structural transformations in European security at the end of the Cold War and argues that concerns about traditional military security would decrease and that the issue of societal security would become more important in the future. The work is considered to be belong to the Copenhagen School of security studies.
