= Regional power =

State wielding power within a geographical region

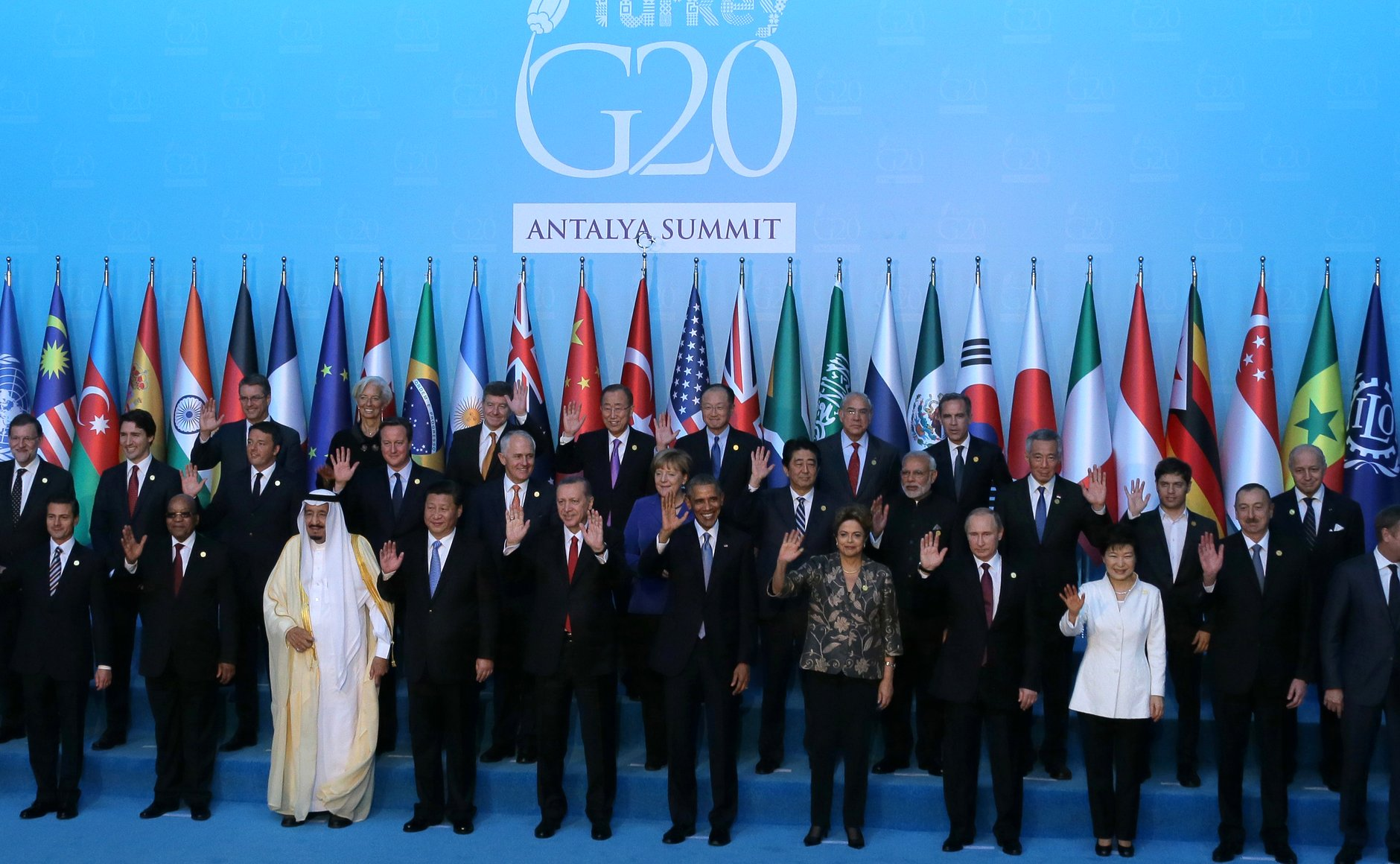
Leaders of most of the regional powers at the 2015 G20 Summit

A regional power is a sovereign state that exercises significant power in international relations within its geographical region. States that wield unrivaled power and influence within a region of the world possess regional hegemony. These states operate across the international power spectrum – small, middle, and great – with the latter two flexing regional influence as "global swing states".

== Characteristics ==
Regional powers shape the polarity of a regional area. Typically, regional powers have capabilities which are important in the region, but do not have capabilities at a global scale. Slightly contrasting definitions differ as to what makes a regional power. The European Consortium for Political Research defines a regional power as "a state belonging to a geographically defined region, dominating this region in economic and military terms, able to exercise hegemonic influence in the region and considerable influence on the world scale, willing to make use of power resources and recognized or even accepted as the regional leader by its neighbors."

The German Institute of Global and Area Studies states that a regional power must:

- Form part of a definable region with its own identity
- Claim to be a regional power (self-image as a regional power)
- Exert decisive influence on the geographic extension of the region as well as on its ideological construction
- Dispose over comparatively high military, economic, demographic, political, and ideological capabilities
- Be well integrated into the region
- Define the regional security agenda to a high degree
- Be appreciated as a regional power by other powers in the region and beyond, especially by other regional powers
- Be well connected with regional and global forums

== Regional powers ==
In this list are states that have been described as regional powers by international relations and political science academics, analysts, or other experts. These states, to some extent, meet the criteria for regional power status, as described above. Different experts have differing views on exactly which states are regional powers. States are arranged by their region, and in alphabetical order.

=== Africa ===
Even though the economic weight of Africa is relatively low compared to other continents, and more than two-thirds of African countries are among the least developed states in the world, Africa's rich natural resources and diverse cultures could carry the potential to enable future development.

Although South Africa was diplomatically isolated during the latter years of the apartheid era, it is considered to have successfully reintegrated into international affairs over the last 20 years. It is recognized as the only newly industrialized country in Africa and takes a crucial role in BRICS and G20.

- Egypt – a member of the BRICS, CIVETS, and D-8.

==== Sub-Saharan Africa ====
- South Africa – a member of the G20, BRICS, and CIVETS.

=== Americas ===
==== North America ====
The United States is the primary geopolitical force in North America, and is widely considered as the sole contemporary superpower globally. It dominates the region so heavily that its neighbors, Canada and Mexico, both middle powers in the region, are generally not considered regional powers. Despite having a large enough economy to be a member of the G7, Canada is not a regional power for two reasons. It is militarily secure as a result of US hegemony, and has become financially comfortable by its dependence on, and deep integration with, a robust US economy. Mexico is an emerging power which could probably be viewed as a regional power if grouped with Latin America, or a definite regional power if considered in either Middle America or in Hispanic America due to its economic size and diverse cultural heritages. However, similar to Canada, Mexican economy is highly reliant on the US with about 80% of its exports shipping to the US alone.

- United States – a permanent member of the UN Security Council (P5); a member of the G7, G20, OECD, QUAD, and AUKUS; and considered a superpower.

==== South America ====
Since the Age of Discovery, Portugal and Spain mostly divided South America to be the foremost colonial powers in the continent, but following decolonization in the first half of the 19th century, the European powers withdrew and new nations were established, although their cultural influence and languages still remain predominant in Latin America.

Brazil is considered one of the most compelling geopolitical power in South America, as the country has the highest population and landmass in the continent, and its economic size, which possesses large stockpiles of natural resources, including valuable minerals, a tenth of the world's fresh water and it's also one of the countries that contain the Earth's largest remaining rainforest. Brazil has an important role in international relations, especially in economic and global environmental issues.

- Brazil – a member of the G20, BRICS, and OEI; and one of the G4 nations.

=== Asia ===
Historically, Imperial China was the dominant power in East Asia. From the late 19th century, the Empire of Japan initiated far-reaching Westernizing reforms, and rapidly industrialized, to become a major power in Asia by the time of World War I, as one of the Allied powers. With economic turmoil, Japan's expulsion from the League of Nations, and its interest in expansion on the mainland, Japan became one of the three main Axis powers in World War II.

Since the late 20th century, regional alliances, economic progress, and contrasting military power changed the strategic and regional power balance in Asia. In recent years, a re-balancing of military and economic power among emerging powers, such as China and India, has resulted in significant changes in the geopolitics of Asia. China and Japan have also gained greater influence over regions beyond Asia. In recent decades, South Korea has emerged as a significant economic and cultural power in East Asia. Japan and South Korea are important allies for the United States in the Indo-Pacific region.

==== East Asia ====
- China– a permanent member of the UN Security Council (P5); a member of the G20, BRICS, and Shanghai Cooperation Organisation (SCO); and considered a superpower.
- Japan – a member of the G7, G20, OECD, and QUAD; one of the G4 nations; and currently viewed as a middle power.
- South Korea – a member of the G20, MIKTA, and OECD.

==== Southeast Asia ====
- Indonesia – a member of the G20, BRICS, MIKTA, CIVETS, D-8, and G-15.

==== South Asia ====
- India – a member of the G20, BRICS, SCO, and QUAD; one of the G4 nations; and considered a great power.

==== Middle East/West Asia ====
- Egypt – a member of the BRICS, CIVETS, and D-8.
- Iran – a member of the SCO, BRICS, G-15, and OPEC.
- Israel – a member of the OECD.
- Saudi Arabia – a member of the G20 and OPEC.
- Turkey – a member of the G20, OECD, MIKTA, CIVETS, and D-8.

=== Europe ===
Russia – the dominant part of a former superpower, the Soviet Union, is now considered a great power, and has historically been the primary geopolitical force in Eastern Europe. France, Germany, Italy, and the United Kingdom, collectively known as Big Four in Western Europe, as they play pivotal roles as part of the NATO Quint in the security of the Western Bloc. Most of the continent is now integrated as a consequence of the enlargement of the European Union, which is sometimes considered a great power as a whole, despite it not being a sovereign state. Historically, dominant powers in Europe created colonial empires (such as the Belgian, British, Danish, Dutch, French, German, Italian, Portuguese, Russian, and Spanish Empires).

==== Central Europe ====
- Germany – a member of the G7, G20, E4, EU trio, OECD, and Quint; one of the G4 nations.

==== Central and Eastern Europe ====
- Poland – a member of the OECD; and considered a middle power.

==== Eastern Europe ====
- Russia – a permanent member of the UN Security Council (P5); a member of the G20, BRICS, and Shanghai Cooperation Organisation (SCO); and considered a great power. (Note: Russia and Germany have historically been considered key regional players in European affairs.)

==== Western Europe ====
- France – a permanent member of the UN Security Council (P5); a member of the G7, G20, E4, EU trio, OECD, and Quint; and considered a great power.
- United Kingdom – a permanent member of the UN Security Council (P5); a member of the G7, G20, E4, OECD, Quint, and AUKUS; and considered a great power.

==== Southern Europe ====
- Italy – a member of the G7, G20, E4, EU trio, OECD, and Quint; and considered a great power.

=== Oceania ===
Australia is considered to be a regional power due to its significant commercial and diplomatic relations in Asia–Pacific region since the late 1990s.

- Australia – a member of the G20, OECD, MIKTA, QUAD, and AUKUS.

== See also ==
- List of medieval great powers
- List of modern great powers

== Bibliography ==
- Buzan, Barry; Wæver, Ole (2003), Regions and Powers: The Structure of International Security, Cambridge: Cambridge University Press, p. 55, ISBN 978-0-521-89111-0
- Godehardt, Nadine; Nabers, Dirk, eds. (2011), Regional Orders and Regional Powers, Routledge, pp. 193–208, ISBN 978-1-136-71891-5
- Stewart-Ingersoll, Robert; Frazier, Derrick (2012), Regional Powers and Security Orders: A Theoretical Framework, Routledge, ISBN 978-0-415-56919-4
