= Regional security complex theory =

International relations theory

Regional security complex theory (RSCT) is a theory of international relations developed by Barry Buzan and Ole Wæver and advanced in their 2003 work Regions and Powers: The Structure of International Security. Buzan and Wæver are perhaps best known as the key figures behind the influential Copenhagen School of security studies, in which the main principle is examining security as a social construct (see also securitization and constructivism).

RSCT posits that international security should be examined from a regional perspective, and that relations between states (and other actors) exhibit regular, geographically clustered patterns. Regional security complex is the term coined by Buzan and Wæver to describe such structures.

== Regional security complexes ==
Regional security complexes (RSC) are defined as distinct and stable patterns of security interaction between actors. They are distinguished from one another by degrees of interaction. The level of interaction between members of the same RSC is high, while between members of different RSCs it is comparatively low. As the name implies, regional security complexes are by nature geographical, consisting of neighboring actors and being insulated from one another by natural barriers such as oceans, desert, and mountain ranges. Individual states can also function as such "insulators" between RSCs.

RSCT posits that actors' actions and motivations in the field of international security are heavily regional in character. This means that an actor's security concerns are primarily generated in their immediate neighborhood. The security of each actor in a region interacts with the security of the other actors. Most security concerns do not travel well over distances, and threats within an actor's immediate neighborhood are therefore most likely felt the strongest. Due to the way adjacency works there is often intense security interdependence within an RSC, but interaction with outsiders is much less active. As Buzan and Wæver state:

Simple physical adjacency tends to generate more security interaction among neighbours than among states located in different areas, a point also emphasised by Walt (1987: 276-7) Adjacency is potent for security because many threats travel more easily over short distances than over long ones.

The theory is complicated by existence of actors with global security interests and force projection capabilities. However, Buzan and Wæver posit that even the global powers' security interests are fundamentally regional in nature. Their involvement in regional security issues should be most often seen as them being drawn in by regionally generated matters; not necessarily as great power issues penetrating an RSC, although that can happen as well.

RSCs can be interpreted as systems in and of themselves, as "micro" systems embedded in a larger, global political system. RSCs contain their own security dynamics, which are in normal circumstances largely independent from global security dynamics. This enables the application of various IR concepts – such as balance of power, polarity, and interdependence – on a regional scale. Further refining the theory are the concepts of regional subcomplexes (essentially RSCs within RSCs) and supercomplexes (essentially the adjoining of neighboring RSCs).

Buzan and Wæver view security interests as primarily regional in nature. This is in opposition to a view – predominant during the Cold War – that sees security politics as largely a reflection of global great power interests. Buzan and Wæver point to the Middle East as an example, where the security landscape has seen no effective change despite the ending of the Cold War:

Security features at the level of regions are durable. They are substantially self-contained not in the sense of being totally free-standing, but rather in possessing a security dynamic that would exist even if other actors did not impinge on it. This relative autonomy was revealed by the ending of the Cold War, when enmities such as that between Israel and Syria, and Iraq and the Gulf Arab States, easily survived the demise of a superpower rivalry that had supported, but not generated, them.

RSCs are conceptually distinct from "regions". Where as regions – as used in culture, history, or politics – are discursively formed concepts with varying definitions depending on context, RSCs are strictly theoretical constructs, formed from theory via deductive reasoning. Therefore, culturally relevant definitions such as "Europe" or "Middle East" do not necessarily constitute RSCs; however there is overlap with theoretically defined RSCs and cultural definitions of regions. Buzan and Wæver's view of security as a social construct means that things such as culture and history can have significant influence on actors’ perceptions. RSCs are nevertheless solely based on distinct patterns of interaction.

== Place in international relations theory literature ==
Buzan and Wæver describe their work as a sort of extension of the monolithic neorealist school of international relations, "incorporating" it, while also filling in perceived theoretical gaps. They stress the importance of adopting a regional perspective (as opposed to the predominant global system one) and paying more attention to security actors other than states.

The conception of security not as an objective fact, but as an intersubjectively constructed social phenomenon is the mainstay of the Copenhagen school of IR. RSCT hinges on this social definition of security. According to RSCT, regional security complexes cannot be identified or understood by merely examining material differences between actors (for example size of armed forces or nuclear arsenal), rather, attention needs to be paid how actors interpret such material facts.

RSCT should not be confused with regionalism, a subset of IR from the 1970s concerned mostly with regional integration. In Regions and Powers, Buzan and Wæver view earlier attempts to conceptualize international regions as unsuccessful.
