= Håkan Wiberg =

Swedish peace and conflict academic (1942–2010)

Lars Håkan Valdemar Wiberg
- Born: 12 June 1942; Fryksände, Sweden
- Died: 4 July 2010 (aged 68); Copenhagen, Denmark

Academic background
- Education: Lund University
- Influences: Johan Galtung

Academic work
- School or tradition: Peace and conflict studies
- Institutions: Lund University

Director of Copenhagen Peace Research Institute (COPRI)
- In office 1988–2001
- Succeeded by: Danish Institute for International Studies (DIIS)

Lars Håkan Valdemar Wiberg (12 June 1942 in Fryksände – 4 July 2010 in Copenhagen, Denmark) was a leading figure among Nordic peace academics and well known Swedish peace and conflict researcher, sociology professor, mathematician, peace journal editor and peace institute director.

== Education ==
After upper secondary education in Ängelholm, Wiberg already came to Lund University at sixteen-year-old and started his academic education at a brisk pace. He studied mathematics and philosophy but then focused on sociology. He defended his PhD in 1977, but already in 1971 he had become head of Lund University Peace Institute (LUPRI). In 1981, he was appointed professor of sociology at Lund University.

Wiberg was considered a broad intellectual by those who worked with him as for example Johan Galtung, Oberg. Galtung mentioned that he was at home in mathematics, China, social science, philosophy, well versed in many languages – a living example of the multidisciplinary of peace studies. He had an encyclopedic knowledge that was proverbial, loved life, good food and wine.

== Peace institutes and board functions ==
Hakan was long-time director of Lund University Peace Institute (LUPRI) and Copenhagen Peace Research Institute (COPRI). He was president of the European Peace Research Association (EUPRA) and member of the International Peace Research Association (IPRA). After COPRI dissolved, he became member of the Danish Institute for International Studies (DIIS). Wiberg joined the board of The Transnational Foundation (TFF) of his friend and colleague Jan Olberg in 1985 and stayed until August 2006. Håkan co-wrote with Johan Galtung and Jan Olberg on the Yugoslavia conflict. He was for 33 years editor on the board of Waltungs Journal of Peace Research.

According to Nigel Young, it is his greatest intellectual contribution "to stand outside the parameters of the Cold War in its last two decades. Asking 'What is East? What is West?'" His knowledge of Eastern/Central Europe led him, from the l970s, to a special focus on South Slav societies, He further joined the board of the International University Centre (IUC) in Dubrovnik, one of his many relations during over 40 years with ex-Yugoslavia. Wiberg was also well versed in many languages including Serbian.

=== The Hyaena Club ===
He also considered members of the Hyaena Club (Johan Galtung, Judit Balasz, Karlheinz Koppe, Jan Oberg and Biljana Vankovska). This title refers, according to Biljana Vankovska to "the cynical laughter at all those arrogant and self-amorous persons who admire their own academic egos, who consider themselves too respectable and important while repeat old boring mantras and mainstream dogmas, and who lack courage and virtue to deconstruct the politically correct newspeak or to raise voices against social injustice in the real world". Galtung mentions this as his good sense of humor; "I hear your hyena laughter, laughing away what has happened as when we were told by some true Soviet believers that left wing social democrats were the hyenas and lackeys of capitalism."

Wiberg was engaged in anti-nuclear issues since the 1960s. He was also active in several solidarity movements for, among others, Vietnam and South-Africa.

== Selected works and publications ==
Hakan is mentioned as a prolific writer and publisher. Some quote over 700 works. A number of works he co-wrote. For example, "Organized Anarchy in Europe" with Jaap de Wilde, "Changes, Chances and Challenges: Europe 2000" and "Peace research for the 1990s" with Judit Balázs.

=== Journals ===
- Wiberg, Hakan (1987). "The Security of Small Nations: Challenges and Defences". Journal of Peace Research. 24 (4): 339–363. ISSN 0022-3433 – via JSTOR.

=== Books ===
- Wilde, Jaap de; Wiberg, Håkan, eds. (1996). Organized anarchy in Europe: the role of states and intergovernmental organizations. Library of international relations. London; New York : New York: Tauris Academic Studies; In the U.S.A. and in Canada distributed by St. Martin's Press. ISBN 978-1-86064-062-9.
- Ryan, Stephen; Reychler, Luc; Wiberg, Håkan; Simic ́, Dragan; Lawson, Max; Galtung, Johan; Cunningham, Peter; Akadémiai Kiadó, eds. (1995). Changes, chances and challenges: Europe 2000. Budapest. ISBN 978-963-05-6932-3.
- Balázs, Judit; Wiberg, Håkan, eds. (1993). Peace research for the 1990s. Budapest: Akadémiai Kiadó. ISBN 978-963-05-6620-9
- Vankovska, Biljana; Wiberg, Håkan, (2003). Between past and future: civil-military relations in post-communist Balkan states. The library of international relations. London; New York: I.B. Tauris. ISBN 978-1-86064-624-9.
