= Thomas Diez =

Thomas Diez (born 2 February 1970) is a German professor of Political Science and International Relations at the Institute for Political Science, University of Tübingen. He was formerly Professor of International Relations Theory in the Department of Political Science and International Studies at the University of Birmingham, where he was Head of Department from 2005 to 2008. Diez earned his PhD at the University of Mannheim. He was formerly a Research Fellow at the Copenhagen Peace Research Institute where he worked with Barry Buzan and Ole Waever. He studies international relations theory, European integration and conflict transformation and is best known for his contributions to the debate on the European Union's normative power. Books he has edited or co-edited include The EU and the Cyprus Conflict: Modern Conflict, Postmodern Union (Manchester University Press, 2002), European Integration Theory (Oxford University Press, 2004, 2009) and The European Union and Border Conflicts (Cambridge University Press, 2008), Cyprus: A Conflict at the Crossroads (Manchester University Press, 2009) and An Introduction to International Relations Theory: Perspectives and Themes (Pearson, 2010).

25 September 2009 Diez was awarded the 2009 Anna Lindh Award for contributions to the analysis of European foreign and security policy.
