= List of people from Abadan =

The following is a list of notable people from and/or related to Abadan, Iran.

== Academia ==
- Jill Allibone (1932–1998), English architectural historian (born in Abadan, grew up in Iran)
- Yadolah Dodge (b. 1944), University Professor in Statistics and Probability
- Ghazal Omid, author and legal scholar
- Hamid Rashidi (b. 1961), lawyer
- Alam Saleh Middle East academic

== Activism, civil rights, and philanthropy ==
- Abie Nathan (1927–2008), Israeli humanitarian and peace activist

== Arts ==
- Firoozeh Dumas (b. 1965), author
- Bizhan Emkanian (b. 1953), actor
- Hamid Farrokhnezhad (b. 1969), actor
- Farzin (1952–1999), pop singer
- Farhad Hasanzadeh (b. 1962), children's writer
- Noreen Motamed (b. 1967), artist
- Amir Naderi (b. 1946), film director
- Khosrow Parvizi (1933–2012), film director
- Zoya Pirzad (b. 1952), author
- Siamak Shayeghi (b. 1954), film director and producer
- Aramazd Stepanian (b. 1951), actor, producer, director and playwright
- Nasser Taghvai (b. 1941), film director and screenwriter
- Ahmad Irandoost (b. 1974), actor, singer and former bodyguard

== Business ==
- Cyma Zarghami (b. 1962/62), television executive

== Politics and government ==
- Ebrahim Rezaei Babadi (b. 1955), politician

== Sports ==
- Ali Abdollahzadeh (b. 1993), football defender
- Ahmad Reza Abedzadeh (b. 1966), retired footballer
- Patrik Baboumian (b. 1979), strongman
- Abdolreza Barzegari (b. 1958), retired footballer
- Karim Bavi (b. 1964), retired footballer
- Mohsen Bayatinia (b. 1980), former footballer and coach
- Ali Firouzi (b. 1955), football coach
- Bahman Golbarnezhad (1968–2016), Paralympic cyclist
- Mehdi Hasheminasab (b. 1973), retired footballer
- Ahmad Khaziravi (b. 1989), footballer
- Mojahed Khaziravi (b. 1980), footballer
- Gholam Hossein Mazloumi (1950–2014), footballer
- Parviz Mazloumi (b. 1954), retired footballer
- Hossein Nassim (b. 1952), swimmer
- Hassan Nazari (b. 1956), football coach
- Fakher Tahami (b. 1996), football forward
- Hossein Vafaei (b. 1994), professional Snooker player
