= Mark B. Salter =

Canadian academic

Mark B. Salter is a full professor of political science at the University of Ottawa in Ottawa, Ontario, Canada. He is currently the editor-in-chief of Security Dialogue, an academic journal in the field of security studies. Salter received a PhD in political science from the University of British Columbia in 1999, and held a professorship at The American University in Cairo before moving to the University of Ottawa.

== Research ==
Salter's research focuses on critical security studies and international relations theory. He has written on securitization (international relations), border security, airport security, and most recently on actor–network theory in IR. Before becoming editor of Security Dialogue, he was an associate editor for the journals International Political Sociology and Security Dialogue.

== Teaching ==
Salter teaches undergraduate and graduate courses on international relations theory and geopolitics. He has received the Prize for Teaching Excellence from the Canadian Political Science Association, as well as the National Capital Educator's Award and the University of Ottawa Excellence in Education Prize. He has published work in the Journal of Political Science Education and International Studies Perspectives on pedagogy and teaching methods.
