= Identity, Migration and the New Security Agenda in Europe =

1993 book by Barry Buzan

- Author: Ole Wæver, Barry Buzan, Morten Kelstrup and Pierre Lemaitre
- Publication date: 1993

Identity, Migration and the New Security Agenda in Europe is a 1993 book by Ole Wæver, Barry Buzan, Morten Kelstrup and Pierre Lemaitre. The work is significant to the Copenhagen School of security studies as an early collaboration between Ole Waever and Barry Buzan and for weakening the state-centrism of early securitization theory.
