= Akın Ünver =

Hamid Akın Ünver (born 1982) is an assistant professor of international relations at Özyeğin University, specializing in energy politics, conflict psychology and radicalization sociology. He also studies discourse theory, regional security complex theory and psychoanalytic approaches to decision-making and teaches courses on the politics of the Middle East, diplomatic history, energy security and security theory.

== Biography and career ==
Born and raised in Ankara, Turkey, he graduated from T.E.D. Ankara College in 1999 and earned his BA in international relations from Bilkent University (2003) and master's degree in European studies from Middle East Technical University (2005). He received his PhD from the Department of Government, University of Essex, where his dissertation, 'A comparative analysis of the discourses on the Kurdish question in the European Parliament, US Congress and Turkish National Assembly' has won the Middle East Studies Association (MESA) 2010 Malcolm H. Kerr Dissertation Award in social sciences. and was awarded departmental nomination for the European Consortium for Political Research's best dissertation in the field of comparative politics. This study is published in 2015 from Routledge Series in Middle East Studies.

Dr. Ünver was a Marcia Robins – Wilf Young scholar at the Washington Institute for Near East Policy in 2007–08 and a dual postdoctoral researcher at the University of Michigan's Center for European Studies and the Center for Middle East and North African Studies in 2008–2010. He was awarded the position of Ertegun Lecturer at the Princeton University's Near Eastern Studies Department, teaching courses such as History of the Middle East, sociology of terrorism and Turkish political sociology. He was also the first scholar to retain the Ertegün chair for two consecutive years at Princeton.

Having published in Foreign Affairs, The Diplomat, Columbia Journal of International Affairs, Middle East Quarterly, Middle East Policy and Yale Journal of International Affairs, Dr. Ünver has also lectured at invited events at Princeton University's Woodrow Wilson School, Georgetown University's Edmund Walsh School of Foreign Service, London School of Economics' Middle East Center and Woodrow Wilson International Center for Scholars. He regularly appears for commentary on BBC World News, France 24, Finnish National Broadcasting Company, Al Jazeera International and CNN-Turk.

He was able to publish several articles while at the University of Michigan, including Turkey's deep-state and the Ergenekon conundrum. Previously, he has assumed teaching positions at the University of Essex and Sabancı University. Also, Akın has held positions with the European Union Secretariat-General, the Turkish Ministry of Foreign Affairs, and the Eurasian Center for Strategic Studies, and the Washington Institute for Near East Policy.

Akın Ünver is a multi-instrumentalist musician and the first Chapman Stick player of Turkey.
