= Societal security =

Societal security is a concept developed by the Copenhagen School of security studies that focuses on the ability of a society to persist in its essential character. It was developed in 1990s in the context of the end of the Cold War and moves towards further integration in the European Union. This paradigm de-emphasizes the role of state power in guaranteeing security by confronting threats, highlighting instead questions of community identity and social dynamics.

== Overview ==
The end of the Cold War prompted scholars to rethink the paradigm of security independently from the state and the military. In Europe, the dissolution of the Soviet Union led to the emergence of new states and sustained efforts to pursue integration of the European Union. The new order called for a rethinking of European security which challenged classic understandings of it as something that took place between states. The move towards an EU security was, thus, closely articulated around questions of EU identity, free movement of people and borders. The concept of societal security, developed by scholars associated with the Copenhagen Peace Research Institute, is situated within this context. Societal security relates to: "the ability of a society to persist in its essential character under changing conditions and possible or actual threats."

The Securitization Theory

When it comes to researching the EU's securitization of the Belt and Road initiative, the acclaimed Copenhagen School provides some useful insights and an analytical methodology. According to the theory's primary proponents, governments may portray any problem as an existential danger to a selected referent object, justifying the deployment of extreme means to deal with it (Buzan et al. 1998). Scholars have identified the European Union (EU) as the securitizing actor, the Belt and Road Initiative (BRI) as the referent object, and the European Union and China as the functional actors. According to Buzan et al. (1998), the issue at hand becomes a security concern the moment it is labelled as one. Other academics, however, such as Balzacq (2011), have elucidated the interplay between the securitizing actor and the acceptability by the audience, which is crucial for securitisation to occur effectively. Inadequate public support and approval can result in a stalled securitization legislation, as has happened before in the EU with other initiatives (Sjöstedt, 2019). Because security is such a broad notion, it is difficult to pin down exactly what constitutes a danger to it. However, Hough (2004) defines a security threat as anything that threatens the safety of a people or limits the government's ability to make policy decisions. In light of the Copenhagen School's concept of securitization, virtually any problem may constitute an existential threat, expanding the scope of national security beyond traditional concerns about military danger (Buzan et al. 1998). This might provide a new theoretical foundation for security studies by taking into account potential risks to societal security, such as those that could compromise the identity of a society or community (Biba, 2018). Despite the ostensible evasiveness of the notion, identity can function as a referent object to be defended and securitized against a perceived threat (Balzacq, 2010). A 'we feeling' and an exceptionalism that broadens the notion that the nation is special, which makes it vulnerable to protection, give birth to these social or identity concerns (Hough, 2004). In reality, there is widespread agreement that security concerns are inherently subjective and rely on the securitizing actor. According to Katzenstein (1996), the actor's behaviour is often a self-reinforcing projection of the persona they believe society wants them to have, supported by the rhetorical strategies they use to cultivate that persona. Because it conforms to the typical behaviour, which is rooted in socially accepted speaking actions, the established routines of security apparatus and danger perception are likely to be repeated. Therefore, the identity of a state is crucial to comprehending its foreign policy, and rhetoric plays a significant part in this process. Some authors, like Debrix (2015), who cite Foucault, argue that the labels we use to categorise and describe the world influence what we learn and how we think about it conceptually and discursively. They argue, however, that the information that is so prevalent in our society is inextricably linked to the dominant power structures that shape both the discourse and the dominant narrative (Debrix 2015). Individuality and subjectivity may be produced through the application of binary oppositions, such as good and evil or us and them (Biba, 2018). A cultural identity, including all its attendant policies, social conventions, and conceptualizations, is formed by these exclusions (Martínez-Galán, 2020). As a result, "performative" is a good way to describe language, as it is the means by which reality is built through spoken actions (Angermüller et al., 2014). To those who take a reflective approach to international relations, discourse is the fundamental analytical building block. Scholars may use this approach to examine the political discourse, trace its development as a political representation, and track its following performative materializations. The empirical study by Léonard and Kaunert (2011) is one of the first to examine how the public perceives securitization. This research explicitly examines the hypothesis that audiences that are exposed to a wide variety of perspectives within a given discursive space are more likely to accept processes of securitization.

== The nation-state in Western and Eastern Europe ==
In 'Identity, Migration, and the New Security Agenda in Europe', Waver notes the emergence of different conceptions of the nation-state, and further establishes a distinction between Western and Eastern Europe. In the West, a “decoupling of state and nation” takes place, as member states, by seeking more integration, accept to relinquish some of their sovereignty. This move towards a “post-sovereign” nation-state is due to “internationalization and Europeanization” processes, as international institutions assume increased influence over domestic affairs. Subsequently, communities, perceiving their identities to be threatened by this integration, can no longer call upon the state to protect them. A duality occurs between the security needs of the state and of society, where “state security has sovereignty as its ultimate criterion, and societal security has identity”. In the East, the emergence of new states, formed after the dismantlement of the Soviet Union, leads to more traditional attempts at merging the nation and the state; thus, conflicts arise when the coupling cannot be done (i.e. Yugoslavia).

== Aspects of societal security ==
In 'Security: a new framework for analysis', Busan et al. formalize their broader understanding of security by introducing five sectors, each governed by “distinctive characteristics and dynamics”, and conceptualized around particular referent objects and actors (i.e. military, environmental, economic, societal and political). Societal security is about the survival of a community as a cohesive unit; its referent object is ”large scale collective identities that can function independent of the state.”

Societal insecurities arise when “a society fears it would not be able to live as itself”, and stem from:

- migration: the influx of people will “overrun or dilute” a group's identity e.g. the need to define Britishness;
- vertical competition: the integration of a group within a broader organization e.g. Euroscepticism with regards to EU integration, national-separatist claims; and,
- horizontal competition: group is forced to integrate more influential identities within their own e.g. France's cultural exception defending itself against American influences.

Societal security is not tied to a territory, as is state security, e.g. the territory of the Kurds, where security matters of state and society widely diverge and enter into conflict.

== Sociological perspective ==
From a sociological perspective, the "societal security" concept embodies a certain view of security. It regards security as an "independent phenomenon": thus, societal security is neither a threat nor an opportunity; it is a center and base, upon which the reliability and certainty of collective life could be constructed. It rereads of security from "social" perspective, meaning that security is seen as based on collective life – the life of common people – instead of looking at differences and insisting on disagreement between groups and states that is a key factor in determining threats and distinguishing friends from foes. It views security as "social phenomenon", which does not need military weapons and soft power solutions. In other words, societal security does not integrate with power and remain by converting links to social capitals. Finally, threats and opportunities could be considered as deterrent or impeller factors.

So the final goal of societal security is comfort and understanding the beauty of collective life – not an interest for government, not eliminating enemies, not confronting perceived threats to the nation. Securitization fits into its foreign policy by examining its history and earlier precedents (Braga & Sangar, 2020). Since securitization is predicated on speech actions and utterances in discourse, it is also important to think about a critical discourse analysis, the primary methodological instrument for this field. Several themes will emerge from deconstructing this discourse into its component parts, so these themes will be evaluated critically to assess their role in the securitisation act, taking into account the intended audience and the impact on legitimacy (Chu & Muneeza 2019). In addition, the securitisation theory will be implemented when the discourse analysis is finished. This way, insightful results that address the research question will be derived. As such, a review of EU and the Chinese government's official statements about the BRI from 2013 to 2021 was conducted. English-language texts were chosen for study because previous research has revealed that Chinese players hope to influence European beliefs through them (Pan 2012; Weil and Jing 2012; Weil and Munteanu 2020). The selection of original materials was done with great care to verify the quality and dependability of the data. This research utilised documents from both domestic and international EU and Chinese political players, including government and state agencies, state-driven media, and think tanks in both China and EU countries (Rogelja, 2019).

== What does securitization do? ==
A community, acting upon these insecurities, will try to present an issue as being an existential threat endangering the survival of a group. Thus, securitization is a tactic that seeks to categorise an issue as an existential threat, for its prioritisation over any other issue (i.e. “absolute priority”). Addressing any other issue would be pointless, if the existential threat is not addressed first. Thereby, securitization justifies and legitimises the use of exceptional measures.

“’Security’ is the move that takes politics beyond the established rules of the game and frames the issue either as a special kind of politics or as above politics. Securitization can thus be seen as a more extreme version of politicization.”

“…when a securitizing actor uses a rhetoric of existential threat and thereby takes an issue out of what under those conditions is “normal politics,” we have a case of securitization.”

Making use of language theory, securitization is conceptualised as a speech-act, and as such, relies on linguistic techniques and audiences. The message has to be properly delivered (e.g. using appropriate vocabulary, framing, diffusion channels, etc.) for an audience to accept it.

“Thus, the exact definition and criteria of securitization is constituted by the intersubjective establishment of an existential threat with a saliency sufficient to have substantial political effects.”

Not all speech-acts are successful. They have to be uttered by those holding enough social capital to be heard and taken seriously. Successful societal security speech-acts can only be uttered by the elites of specific communities. Because of their existential nature, only a few claims can be successfully securitised.

Securitization fits into its foreign policy by examining its history and earlier precedents (Braga & Sangar, 2020). Since securitization is predicated on speech actions and utterances in discourse, it is also important to think about a critical discourse analysis, the primary methodological instrument for this field. Several themes will emerge from deconstructing this discourse into its component parts, so these themes will be evaluated critically to assess their role in the securitisation act, taking into account the intended audience and the impact on legitimacy (Chu & Muneeza 2019). In addition, the securitisation theory will be implemented when the discourse analysis is finished. This way, insightful results that address the research question will be derived. As such, a review of EU and the Chinese government's official statements about the BRI from 2013 to 2021 was conducted. English-language texts were chosen for study because previous research has revealed that Chinese players hope to influence European beliefs through them (Pan 2012; Weil and Jing 2012; Weil and Munteanu 2020). The selection of original materials was done with great care to verify the quality and dependability of the data. This research utilised documents from both domestic and international EU and Chinese political players, including government and state agencies, state-driven media, and think tanks in both China and EU countries (Rogelja, 2019). The qualitative discourse study involved extensive source data collecting, including documents from state institutions, papers from think tanks, and joint remarks from EU and Chinese government leaders. NVivo was used to organise them into relevant categories.

== Criticism ==
The concept of societal security developed by the Copenhagen School has been subject to several academic criticisms. Theiler argues that when discussing societal security there is a tendency to reify societies as independent social agents. Theiler also states that a too vague definition of identity is deployed when discussing the concept and there is a failure to 'demonstrate sufficiently that social security matters to individuals'.

Furthermore, understanding exceptional measures as extremely politicised responses and/or measures outside politics is problematic, as it implies different frames of action within a large scale of possible. What constitutes “normal politics”? Are these measures outside or within the frame of the law? Do they apply to everyone or only to a specific group? Do they hold policy implication? These questions are particularly relevant to appreciate the types of security measures a securitization through societal security could bring, i.e. what could a community do by securitising identities? Hence, this vagueness could indicate a decision not to engage with debates around exceptional measures or the limits of conceptualising the modus operandi of security measures outside of the state. The exhibition of securitization may be deemed successful when the audience embraces this positioning which, then, would warrant 'emergency measures' (Buzan et al., 1998). When a matter is successfully constructed or framed as a security issue, according to the Copenhagen School, the particular matter is given precedence. This essentially implies that the matter receives disproportionate time, resources and attention. Moreover, it also grants the actor assigned to neutralize the threat, the necessary competencies to act swiftly (Chu & Muneeza 2019). Therefore, when an issue is successfully securitized, it transfers from the sphere of normal politics into the sphere of emergency politics. Here, the issue is tackled by sanctioning drastic measures that circumvent the conventional rules and guidelines of policymaking (Taureck, 2006). Securitization theory strongly relies on speech acts structured to respond to specific societal problems. There is a strong emphasis on the consideration of the language aspect as a crucial discourse structure in finding solutions to issues (Buzan et al. 1998). A comprehensive linguistic analysis is therefore necessary to arrive at the core of the issue and determine the discursive themes that reinforce the existing power structures. Although rationalist theories of International Relations have often disregarded the linguistic component and orientated instead towards material resources or institutions, several poststructuralist authors provide analytical tools to examine the speech acts. In quoting Foucault, authors such as Debrix (2015) argue that our conceptual and discursive representations of the world are wholly dependent on labels that form our knowledge and comprehension of the world. The chief interaction in the securitization process transpires between the securitizing actor, which through a securitization move frames a specific issue as a threat (the referent subject) and the group towards which the move is targeted (the referent object). Securitization theory does not clearly stipulate the profile of a securitizing actor. However, there seems to be a broad consensus that the securitizing actor must carry some degree of discursive authority and represent a larger group or collective (e.g. a state, political party, or rebel faction) (Sjöstedt, 2017). Thus, although in principle no one is barred from acting as a securitizing actor, Security studies maintains a strong bias towards the elite political class and security experts. Consequently, securitization is widely viewed to be an intentional, pre-meditated, elite driven process. In this regard, the theory presupposes a level of centralization, entailing that merely actors in high and distinguished positions in society can produce legitimate security discourses (Karyotis, 2011). Thus, certain actors enjoy more privileges than others as it pertains to speech and constructing security concerns (Buzan & Waever, 2003). The audience is also an important component of the securitization theory. In this respect, securitization is assumed to be an intersubjective process that depends on the audience's acceptance. Therefore, if both the securitization actor and the audience recognize a subjective securitizing move, it turns into an intersubjective securitized matter (Sjöstedt, 2017).

== Sources ==
- Bilgin, 2003
- Buzan, Wæver & de Wilde, 1998
- Wæver, 1995
- Wæver, 1996
