= People, States and Fear =

People, States and Fear: The National Security Problem in International Relations
- Author: Barry Buzan
- Language: English
- Genre: security studies

People, States and Fear: The National Security Problem in International Relations was a 1983 work by Barry Buzan. It is one of the foundation texts of the Copenhagen School of security studies. A revised edition of the book was published in 1991 as People, States and Fear: An Agenda for International Security Studies in the Post Cold War Era.

== Content ==
In the 1980s, the text had a significant impact on criticism of the prevailing state-centric views of the international system. Buzan contended that understandings of national security should be broadened to address systemic concerns involving individuals, states, and the entire international system. In this view, economic, social, and environmental factors of security should be considered in addition to political and military aspects of security.
