= Lene Hansen =

Danish international relations scholar

Lene Hansen is an international relations scholar who is a full professor at the University of Copenhagen. Hansen is most well known within academia for her critique of the absence of gender within the thinking of the Copenhagen School of security studies. Her article "The Little Mermaid's Silent Security Dilemma and the Absence of Gender in the Copenhagen School" is most commonly referenced for that argument. The Feminist scholar Christine Sylvester describes Hansen as the 'leading European feminist doing Critical Security Studies'.
