= Peace Research Institute =

Peace Research Institute may refer to:

- Peace Research Institute Frankfurt
- Peace Research Institute Oslo
- Copenhagen Peace Research Institute
- Geneva International Peace Research Institute
- Stockholm International Peace Research Institute
