= Minorities in Iran: Nationalism and Ethnicity after Khomeini =

2014 book by Rasmus Christian Elling

- Author: Rasmus Christian Elling
- Language: English
- Subject: Iranian politics
- Publisher: Palgrave Macmillan
- Publication date: 2014
- Media type: Print
- Pages: 276 pp.
- ISBN: 9781137047809

Minorities in Iran: Nationalism and Ethnicity after Khomeini is a 2014 book by Rasmus Christian Elling in which the author examines inter-ethnic tension and the politicization of ethnic identity in Iran.

== Reception ==
The book was reviewed in the SCTIW review by Eskandar Sadeghi-Boroujerdi, in the International Journal of Middle East Studies by Saghar Sadeghian, in the British Journal of Middle Eastern Studies by Maziyar Ghiabi, in Iranian Studies by Alam Saleh, and in the Journal of the Middle East and Africa by Philip Carl Salzman. Saleh posed some questions to Elling after providing a short review of the book and in turn received some questions from Elling about his own book Ethnic Identity and the State in Iran.

== See also ==
- Arab separatism in Khuzestan
- Kurdish separatism in Iran
