= Post-structural realism =

Form of political realism

Post-structural realism is the self-described position of Ole Waever, one of the leading figures in the Copenhagen School of security studies. The position incorporates elements of post-structuralism and political realism.
