= Matter of Fact =

Matter of Fact or A Matter of Fact may refer to:

- "A Matter of Fact", a short story by Rudyard Kipling
- A Matter of Fact (album), album by American band Facts of Life
- Matter of Fact with Soledad O'Brien, a weekly TV show hosted by Soledad O'Brien
- Matter of Fact with Stan Grant, a nightly Australian TV and radio show on the ABC hosted by Stan Grant
