= Haleh Afshar, Baroness Afshar =

British life peer (1944–2022)

The Right Honourable The Baroness Afshar OBE FAcSS
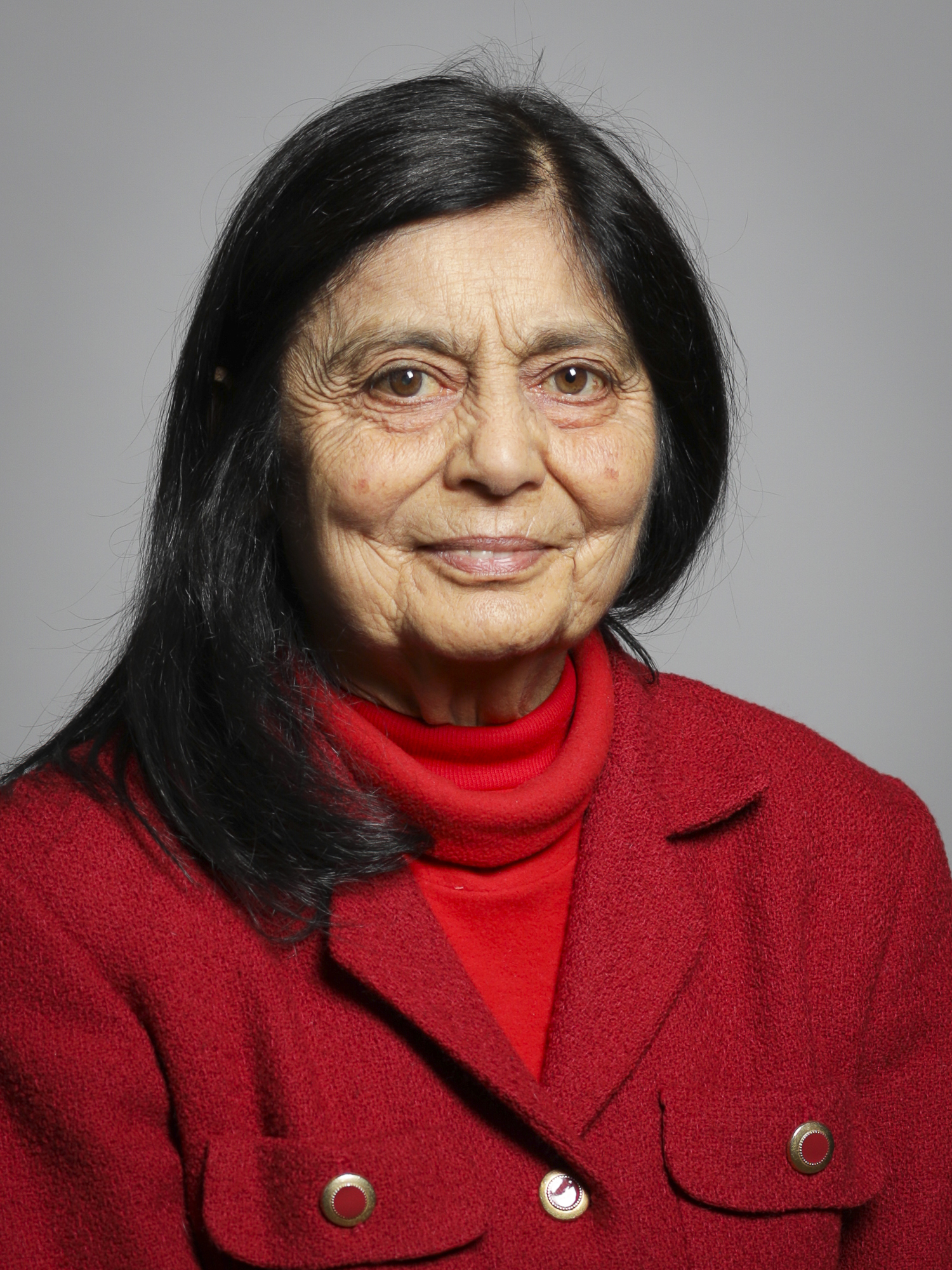
- Official portrait, 2019

Member of the House of Lords
- Lord Temporal
- Life peerage 11 December 2007 – 12 May 2022

Personal details
- Born: 21 May 1944 Tehran, Imperial State of Iran
- Died: 12 May 2022 (aged 77) Heslington, England
- Spouse: Maurice Dodson (m. 1974)
- Children: 2
- Education: University of York; Murray Edwards College, Cambridge
- Profession: professor

Haleh Afshar, Baroness Afshar, OBE, FAcSS (Persian: هاله افشار; 21 May 1944 – 12 May 2022) was a British life peer in the House of Lords. She had a life-long interest in women's rights and Islamic law. She was a professor at the University of York and she wrote over a dozen scholarly books.

== Life and career ==
Haleh Afshar was the eldest of four children born to Hassan Afshar and Pouran Khabir. She was born on 21 May 1944 in Tehran, Iran. Her father was at one point a government minister and he was a professor of law at Tehran University and her mother successfully campaigned for women to gain the vote. She went first to the Jeanne d’Arc school in Tehran.

At the age of 14, she was boarding in Solihull, England to attend school there. She joined the new University of York in England after completing her A-levels in Brighton, England, and she gained her first degree in 1967 in Social Sciences. Five years later she gained a diploma from the University of Strasbourg in France, before completing a doctorate (PhD) in Land Economy at New Hall, Cambridge (now Murray Edwards College) in 1974.

She then returned to work in Iran's land reform ministry. She also worked as a journalist and her research led her to understand that many Iranian women did not understand their Islamic rights. Her journalism led her into exile as an article about the royal family was not well received.

In 1974, Afshar married her husband Maurice Dodson, emeritus professor of maths at the University of York. In 1976, she was lecturing at the University of Bradford in England.

Afshar became a professor of politics and women's studies at the University of York, and a visiting professor of Islamic law at the Faculté internationale de droit comparé (international faculty of comparative law) at Robert Schuman University in Strasbourg, France. Afshar served on the British Council and the United Nations Association, of which she was honorary president of international services. She was appointed to the board of the Women's National Commission in September 2008. She served as the chair for the British Society for Middle Eastern Studies. Afshar was a founding member of the Muslim Women's Network. She served on the Home Office's working groups, on "engaging with women" and "preventing extremism together".

She was appointed an Officer of the Order of the British Empire in the 2005 Birthday Honours. for services to equal opportunities.

On 18 October 2007, it was announced that she would be made a baroness and join the House of Lords as a cross-bench life peer. She was introduced into the House of Lords on 11 December 2007, as Baroness Afshar, of Heslington in the County of North Yorkshire.

In March 2009, she was named as one of the twenty most successful Muslim women in the UK on the Muslim Women Power List 2009. The list was a collaboration between the Equality and Human Rights Commission, Emel Magazine and The Times, to celebrate the achievements of Muslim women in the UK.

In April 2009, she was appointed an academician of the Academy of Social Sciences.

Afshar died from kidney failure at her home in Heslington, on 12 May 2022, aged 77.

== Honours ==
In 2011, Afshar received an honorary doctorate from the University of Essex.

In January 2013, Afshar was nominated for the Services to Education award at the British Muslim Awards.

In 2017, Afshar received an honorary doctorate from the University of Bradford.

== Works ==
Afshar wrote about Iran and Iranian politics both for academia and the media. Her books include Islam and Feminisms: An Iranian Case Study (Macmillan, 1998), and Islam and the Post Revolutionary State in Iran (Macmillan, 1994). She edited thirteen books on women and development.

- Afshar, Haleh (1985). Women, work, and ideology in the Third World. London New York: Tavistock Publications. ISBN 9780422797108.
- Afshar, Haleh (1985). Iran, a revolution in turmoil. Albany: State University of New York Press. ISBN 9780887061264.
- Afshar, Haleh (1987). Women, state, and ideology: studies from Africa and Asia. Albany: State University of New York Press. ISBN 9780887063947.
- Afshar, Haleh; Agarwal, Bina (1989). Women, poverty and ideology in Asia: contradictory pressures, uneasy resolutions. Houndmills, Basingstoke, Hampshire England: Macmillan. ISBN 9780333444092.
- Afshar, Haleh (1991). Women, development, and survival in the Third World. London New York: Longman. ISBN 9780582034945.
- Afshar, Haleh (1993). Women in the Middle East: perceptions, realities and struggles for liberation. Basingstoke: Macmillan. ISBN 9780333575659.
- Afshar, Haleh; Maynard, Mary (1994). The dynamics of "race" and gender: some feminist interventions. London Bristol, PA: Taylor & Francis. ISBN 9780748402113.
- Afshar, Haleh (1996). Women and politics in the Third World. London New York: Routledge. ISBN 9780415138536.
- Afshar, Haleh (1998). Women and empowerment : illustrations from the Third World. New York: St. Martin's Press. ISBN 9780333719732.
- Afshar, Haleh (1998). Islam and feminisms: an Iranian case-study. New York: St. Martin's Press. ISBN 9780312214326.
- Afshar, Haleh; Barrientos, Stephanie (1999). Women, globalization and fragmentation in the developing world. Houndmills, Basingstoke, Hampshire New York: Palgrave Macmillan. ISBN 9780312216597.

== See also ==
- List of Iranian women politicians
