= Security: A New Framework for Analysis =

Book by Barry Buzan, Ole Wæver and Jaap de Wilde

- Author: Barry Buzan, Ole Waever and Jaap de Wilde
- Language: English
- Genre: security studies
- Publisher: Lynne Rienner Publishers Inc
- Publication date: 30 September 1997
- Publication place: USA
- Pages: 239
- ISBN: 1-55587-784-2

Security: A New Framework for Analysis is a book by Barry Buzan, Ole Wæver and Jaap de Wilde. It is considered to be the leading text outlining the views of the Copenhagen School of security studies. The work addresses two important conceptual developments: Buzan's notion of sectoral analysis and Ole Wæver's concept of 'securitization'. The book advocates for an intersubjective conceptualization of security, positing that the understanding of security should be broadened beyond its traditional scope. It contends that security should encompass a wider array of issues, such as environmental threats and challenges to societal identities.

Authors of this book come up with constructive ideas about international security, culture, economics.

This book contains 9 chapters:

1. Introduction
2. Security Analysis: Conceptual Apparatus
3. The Military Sector
4. The Environmental Sector
5. The Economic Sector
6. The Societal Sector
7. The Political Sector
8. How Sectors Are Synthesized
9. Conclusions
