= In Search of Security =

1987 nonfiction book by Caroline Thomas

In Search of Security was a 1987 international relations text by Caroline Thomas. It is considered a leading text of the Third World Security School.
