= Many Inventions =

1893 collection of short stories by Rudyard Kipling

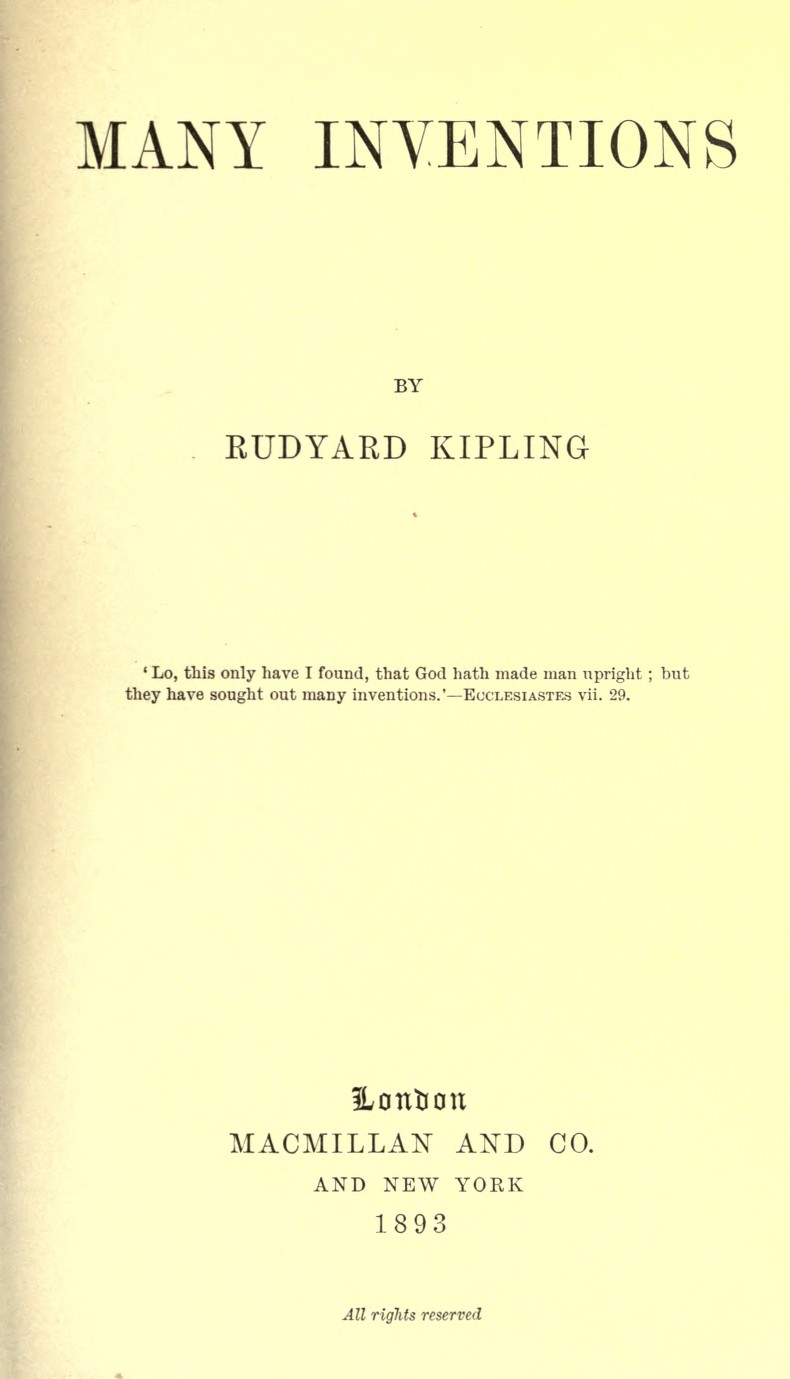
- Author: Rudyard Kipling
- Language: English
- Genre: Short story collection
- Publisher: Macmillan & Co., London; The Macmillan Company, New York
- Publication date: May 1893
- Publication place: United Kingdom and United States
- Pages: 365 (First edition)
- LC Class: PR4854 .M3 1893
- Text: Many Inventions at Project Gutenberg Australia

Many Inventions is an 1893 collection of short stories by Rudyard Kipling. 11 of the 14 stories appeared previously in various publications, including The Atlantic Monthly and The Strand Magazine. Eight of the stories were written in England, while the other six were written in Vermont after Kipling had married and settled with Caroline Balestier.

The title refers to a verse from Ecclesiastes, which is quoted on the title page: "Lo, this only have I found, that God hath made man upright; but they have sought out many inventions." (Ecclesiastes 7:29)

== The stories ==
The fourteen stories are preceded by a poem, "To the True Romance", and followed by another poem, "Anchor Song".

- The Disturber of Traffic (First published in The Atlantic Monthly, September 1891)
- A Conference of the Powers (First published in The Pioneer, May 1890)
- My Lord the Elephant (First published in The Civil and Military Gazette, December 1892)
- One View of the Question (First published in The Fortnightly Review, February 1890)
- 'The Finest Story in the World' (First published in The Contemporary Review, July 1891)
- His Private Honour (First published in Macmillan's Magazine, October 1891)
- A Matter of Fact (First published in People, January 1892)
- The Lost Legion (First published in The Strand Magazine, May 1893)
- In the Rukh (Not previously published. First appearance of Mowgli, but the last of his stories chronologically)
- 'Brugglesmith' (First published in The Week's News, October 1891)
- 'Love-o’-Women' (Not previously published)
- The Record of Badalia Herodsfoot (First published in Harper's Weekly, November 1890)
- Judson and the Empire (Not previously published)
- The Children of the Zodiac (First published in Harper's Weekly, December 1891)
