= Nicola Pratt =

British political scientist

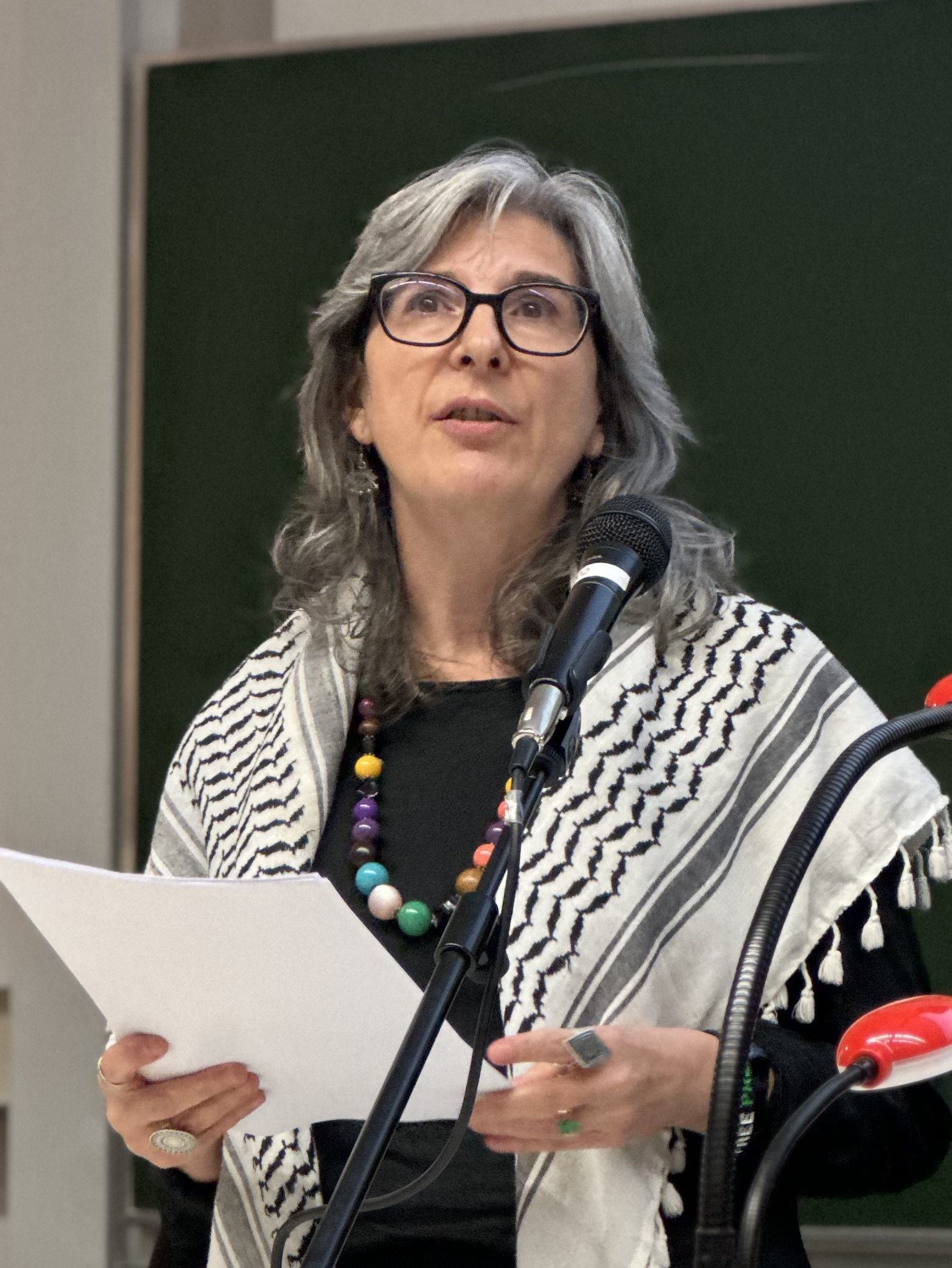
Pratt in 2025

Nicola Pratt is a British political scientist specializing in the International Relations of the Middle East and feminist international relations theory. She is a Professor of International Relations in the Department of Politics and International Relations at the University of Warwick in the UK.

== Education ==
Pratt earned an M.A. and Ph.D. in Middle Eastern politics from the University of Exeter.

== Career ==
After a research fellowship at the University of Birmingham, Pratt became a lecturer in comparative politics and international relations at the University of East Anglia. Subsequently, she took up the positions of Reader and then Professor of the International Politics of the Middle East at the University of Warwick.

Since 2024, Pratt has served as President of the British Society for Middle Eastern Studies.

== Research ==
Pratt is a specialist in human rights, civil society and democratization in the Arab world as well as gender, war and security in the Middle East.

Her most recent book, Embodying Geopolitics: Generations of Women’s Activism in Egypt, Jordan and Lebanon, was published in 2020 by the University of California Press. It was awarded the Susan Strange Best Book Prize by the British International Studies Association in 2021.

== Awards ==
- Susan Strange Best Book Prize, British International Studies Association (BISA)
- BRIMES Award for Services to Middle Eastern Studies, British Society for Middle Eastern Studies
