= Cambridge Review of International Affairs =

- Discipline: International relations
- Language: English
- Edited by: Leah M. Schmidt, Connor O’Brien

Publication details
- History: 1986–present
- Publisher: Taylor & Francis
- Frequency: Bimonthly
- Impact factor: 2.5 (5 year average) (2023)

Standard abbreviations
- ISO 4: Camb. Rev. Int. Aff.

Indexing
- ISSN: 0955-7571 (print); 1474-449X (web)
- LCCN: 89644312
- OCLC no.: 50327050

Links
- Journal homepage; Online access; Online archive; Journal page at publisher's website

The Cambridge Review of International Affairs (CRIA) is a peer-reviewed academic journal publishing scholarship in international relations, particularly the fields of international studies, international law, and international political economy. The journal also specialises in Historical International Relations. It is published by Taylor & Francis.

== Background ==
CRIA was founded in 1985 by Jeffrey Pryce, a graduate student in the Centre of International Studies (now part of the Department of Politics and International Studies) at the University of Cambridge. Its first issue was published in 1986. Its editorial board is chaired by Ilias Alami of the University of Cambridge's Centre of Development Studies and Giovanni Mantilla.

== Notable articles ==
Most cited articles include Globalisation or 'glocalisation'? Networks, territories and rescaling by Erik Swyngedouw, Does capitalism need the state system? by Alex Callinicos, Europe's others and the return of geopolitics by Thomas Diez, and Environmental security and climate change: analysing the discourse by Maria Julia Trombetta.

== Abstracting and indexing ==
CRIA is abstracted and indexed in the Social Sciences Citation Index. According to the Journal Citation Reports, the journal has a 2019 impact factor of 1.366, ranking it 45th out of 95 journals in the category "International Relations", and 94th out of 181 in "Political Science".
