= Securitization (international relations) =

Transformation of a subject into a matter of state security

Securitization in international relations and national politics is the process of state actors transforming subjects from regular political issues into matters of "security". While the "Copenhagen School" originally focused on a logic of exception, where security is defined by crisis and the suspension of normal politics, later work, often associated with the Paris School, also recognized a logic of routine, suggesting that securitization occurs through mundane bureaucratic practices and surveillance technologies. Both logics function across material, discursive, and psychological dimensions.

Issues that become securitized do not necessarily represent issues that are essential to the objective survival of a state, but rather represent issues where someone was successful in constructing an issue into an existential problem.

Securitization theorists assert that successfully securitized subjects receive disproportionate amounts of attention and resources compared to unsuccessfully securitized subjects causing more human damage. A common example used by theorists is how terrorism is a top priority in security discussions, even though people are much more likely to be killed by automobiles or preventable diseases than from terrorism. Securitization studies aims to understand "who securitizes (securitizing actor), on what issues (threats), for whom (referent object), why, with what results, and not least, under what conditions."

== Origin ==
Within international relations, the concept is connected with the Copenhagen School and is seen as a synthesis of constructivist and classical political realism in its approach. The term was coined by Ole Wæver in 1993, but seems to have become commonplace, at least within constructivist studies of international relations.

== Definition ==
Securitization begins with a speech act concerning a particular threat, by an authoritative national leader, institution, or party. The speech act attempts to shift the threat from normal politics into a security concern, thereby legitimating extraordinary measures to contain the threat.

Securitization is a process-oriented conception of security, which stands in contrast to materialist approaches of classical security studies. Classical approaches of security focus on the material dispositions of the threat including distribution of power, military capabilities, and polarity, whereas securitization examines how a certain issue is transformed by an actor into a matter of security in order to allow for the use of extraordinary measures.

Moreover, the securitization act, to be successful, must be accepted by the audience, regardless of the subject matter being a real threat. As Thierry Braspenning-Balzacq puts it: "securitization is a rule-governed practice, the success of which does not necessarily depend on the existence of a real threat, but on the discursive ability to effectively endow a development with such a specific complexion". The audience may take several forms including technical, bureaucratic, public, and policymaking, and different audiences can perform different functions by accepting a securitization, as has been explored by Roe.

== As a process ==
All securitization acts involve four components:

- A securitizing actor/agent: an entity that makes the securitizing move/statement;
- An existential threat: an object (or ideal) that has been identified as potentially harmful;
- A referent object: an object (or ideal) that is being threatened and needs to be protected;
- An audience: the target of the securitization act that needs to be persuaded and accept the issue as a security threat.

That a given subject is securitized does not necessarily mean that the subject is of objective essence for the survival of a given state, but means merely that someone has successfully constructed something as an existential problem. However, Uriel Abulof argues that empirical studies on securitization have been "insufficiently attentive to societies engulfed in profound existential uncertainty about their own survival." Taking Israel's "demographic demon" as a case in point, Abulof suggests that such societies are immersed in "deep securitization", whereby "widespread public discourses explicitly frame threats as probable, protracted, and endangering the very existence of the nation/state." Principally, anyone can succeed in constructing something as a security problem through speech acts. The ability to effectively securitize a given subject is, however, highly dependent on both the status of a given actor and whether similar issues are generally perceived to be security threats.

== Effects on society ==
Securitization theorists argue that a subject that has been successfully securitized will receive disproportionate attention and resources in comparison with subjects that have not been securitized, even when these other subjects actually cause more harm.

traffic incidents cause on average 150,000 fatalities a year in 56 states ... people tend to accept this as a mere fact and do not securitize this by demanding extraordinary measures. It is dealt with as a concern for ordinary politics and legal regulations. There is a tendency to individualize the casualties ... Terrorist attacks caused in the years 1994 to 2004 worldwide average 5,312 fatalities per year. That is less than 5% of the numbers of persons killed annually in traffic accidents in UNECE countries alone. Nevertheless, it is a top priority in security discourses.

If a subject is successfully securitized, then it is possible to legitimize extraordinary means to solve a perceived problem. This could include declaring a state of emergency or martial law, mobilizing the military or attacking another country. Furthermore, if something is successfully labelled as a security problem, then the subject can be considered to be an illegitimate subject for political or academic debate. According to an overview of the field by Roe, securitization theorists tend to treat securitization as a negative process that undermines democratic processes and diminishes necessary scrutiny that would otherwise be focused on political elites.

== Affected sectors ==
In Security: A New Framework for Analysis, Barry Buzan, Ole Wæver, and Jaap de Wilde work with five political sectors in which a securitization could take place:

- Military
- Political
- Economic
- Societal
- Environmental

However, a securitization could easily involve more than one of these sectors. In the case of the 2003 invasion of Iraq, one could say that the conflict was securitized militarily; weapons of mass destruction was one reason for the invasion. However, the war was also securitized as a societal problem; human rights in Saddam Hussein's Iraq was mentioned in the public rationale.

Another example for securitized sectors are immigration and refugee issues. Concerns of terrorist infiltration are regularly cited as grounds for the tight control of borders. As it is easier to securitize an issue following the September 11 attacks, this concern for safety and security has taken attention away from the economic factors that have always been at play in international migration. In addition, in migrants' countries of origin, diaspora, emigration, and citizenship issues can be securitized.

== As a tactic ==
Since securitized subjects can receive a disproportionate amount of attention and resources compared to unsuccessfully securitized subjects, some political strategists suggest that existing public policy issues can find more clout and attention among the public if advocates on these subjects succeed in securitizing them.

For example, theorists suggest that advocates of space exploration could achieve more success by convincing state actors of the merits of their proposals around the rubric of security rather than science: that space exploration could be framed around how it protects humanity from looming existential threats such as meteorites, rather than around how it helps advance scientific knowledge.

The existential threat of climate change is another example of an issue that is beginning to become securitized, for example by the trend to declare a climate change emergency. Though as of 2020, in the opinion of Anatol Lieven, the threat of global warming has not been securitized anywhere near as much as it needs to in order to trigger the substantial changes in government policy needed to give the world a chance to hit the IPCC 1.5 °C target. Lieven argues that securitisation would be especially helpful with climate change as it would enable more military experts to speak out on the subject, with military officers being the one type of expert that conservatives tend to widely respect. On the other hand, in a paper published by the Transnational Institute Nick Buxton argues that "framing the climate crisis as a security issue is deeply problematic as it ultimately reinforces a militarised approach to climate change that is likely to deepen the injustices for those most affected by the unfolding crisis. The danger of security solutions is that, by definition, they seek to secure what exists–an unjust status quo."

== Criticism ==
Liberal scholars such as Daniel Deudney have criticised securitization as being too liable to unleash the emotive power of nationalism in unhelpful ways. Even professors who advocate securitization for issues such as climate change, such as Anatol Lieven, agree that securitizing an issue can cause an overreaction by state actors, for example with the war on terror and even more so with the "war" on drugs and crime. In a 2009 report, public policy analyst Ben Hayes warns that the true beneficiaries from securitization are not general populations, but corporations: He argues that the arms and security companies lobby for a securitised agenda in the corridors of power in Brussels and Washington and subsequently win contracts to implement militarised security policies. Regarding the securitization of migration, researcher Ainhoa Ruiz Benedicto warns of the adverse effects for forcibly displaced persons: "In this context of securitisation of border regions, population movement is understood and treated as a suspicious activity that needs to be controlled, monitored and registered, while the migration of often forcibly displaced people and refugees is seen as a security threat that must be intercepted."

In his book The Problems of Genocide: Permanent Security and the Language of Transgression, A. Dirk Moses argues that securitization, not racism, is at the root of most genocides and similar atrocities.
