= Regions and Powers: The Structure of International Security =

2003 book by Barry Buzan and Ole Waever

- Author: Barry Buzan and Ole Waever
- Genre: Non-fiction
- Publication date: 2003

Regions and Powers: The Structure of International Security is a 2003 book by Barry Buzan and Ole Waever. The book discusses the Copenhagen School's approach to sectoral security.
