= British Society for Middle Eastern Studies =

Learned society

- Established: 1973
- Mission: to encourage Middle Eastern studies
- President: Haleh Afshar
- Key people: Nicola Pratt
- Website: http://www.brismes.ac.uk

The British Society for Middle Eastern Studies (BRISMES) is a British organisation whose purpose is to encourage and advance the study of the Middle East in the United Kingdom. It was established in 1973 and publishes the British Journal of Middle Eastern Studies.

In 2025, the society announced that for its 2026 conference at the SOAS University of London, it would require scholars from the United States, Canada, Australia, New Zealand, and Israel to acknowledge when their research was "conducted on land that is: traditionally owned by indigenous peoples (in settler colonial contexts) or under foreign military occupation in violation of international law". The policy prompted a condemnatory letter to the university from three organisations.
