= J. Peter Burgess =

American philosopher, political scientist (born 1961)

- Born: 1 June 1961 (age 65); Munich, Germany
- Scientific career
- Fields: Philosophy, political science, security theory
- Workplaces: Ecole Normale Supérieure; Vrije Universiteit Brussel

J. Peter Burgess (born 1 June 1961) is a philosopher and political scientist. He is Professor and Director of the Chair of Geopolitics of Risk at the Ecole Normale Supérieure, Paris. He is series editor of the Routledge New Security Studies collection. His research and writing concern the meeting place between science, culture and politics in particular in Europe, focusing most recently on value theory and digital technologies. He has published 18 books and over 100 articles in the fields of philosophy, political science, gender studies, cultural history, security studies and cultural theory. He has contributed to research and educational policy in Norway, France, Poland and the European Commission. In addition, he has developed and directed a number of comprehensive collaborative research projects with Norwegian and European partners.

== Early life and studies ==
Burgess was born in Munich, Germany and grew up in the U.S. Midwest and studied mechanical engineering and applied physics at the University of Colorado, Boulder, graduating with a B.S. in 1983. He then turned to studies in European literature and literary theory, completing a B.A. in English Literature at the University of Iowa in 1984, an A.M. at the University of Chicago in comparative literature in 1986 and an M.Phil. at Columbia University in French and Comparative Literature in 1989. In 1985 he began a series of intermittent studies in semiotics at the University of Paris VI (1988–1989) and philosophy at the Free University of Berlin (1989–1990). He completed a D.E.A. in philosophy at the École des Hautes Études en Sciences Sociales, Paris and a Doctorate in philosophy from Université François Rabelais de Tours in 2010 with a thesis on the politics of Hegel's dialectic.

== Career and research ==
After emigrating to Norway in 1991, Burgess worked as teacher of philosophy at the Lycée Français in Oslo and Adjunct Lecturer in Philosophy at the University of Oslo in 1992-1994 before becoming a Lecturer and Researcher at Volda University College where he remained in several capacities until 1998. His research in this period focused on theories of cultural and national identity and led to a variety of publications on Norwegian nation-building, culture and language politics.

From 1998 to 2000, he was Jean Monnet Fellow at the European University Institute, Florence where his research expanded to questions of the European identity and the language politics of Vico. During this period he also began a collaborative project on security identity at the Peace Research Institute Oslo (PRIO).

In 2001, Burgess was named editor of Security Dialogue at PRIO and undertook a long-term reform of the journal, lifting it to its current status as among the most prominent journals in security studies in the world. In 2004, Burgess was named Leader of PRIO's Security Programme, which he led until 2011. His research in this period focused on theoretical and ethical issues connected to risk, uncertainty, security and insecurity, with a particular attention to European politics. He has argued in a number of works for the cultural, societal and philosophical foundations of security. During this period Burgess rose to spearhead PRIO's European research portfolio. He has been actively involved in funding and execution of over 35 Norwegian and European research projects.

In 2015 he was named director of the AXA Chair in Geopolitics of Risk at the Ecole Normale Supérieure, Paris, a 10-year research programme that seeks to join a range of disciplinary approach to the politics of uncertainty in the global age, in particular the relation of societal values to resilience and the rise of digital technologies.

From 2016 to 2018, Burgess chaired the Ethics Advisory Group of the European Data Protection Supervisor, spearheading the production of the landmark report Toward a Digital Ethics in 2018.

Burgess has held adjunct positions at the Centre for Development and the Environment at the University of Oslo (2003–2004), as visiting professor at the Fondation national de sciences politiques (Sciences Po) (2004–2005), Adjunct Professor at Collegium Civitas, Warsaw (2007–2010), Adjunct Professor at Norwegian University of Science and Technology (NTNU) (2008–2010), and Senior Researcher at the Institute for European Studies, Vrije Universiteit Brussel (2009–2011) and the Neubauer Collegium of the University of Chicago (2015).

== Contributions to research, educational and social policy ==
Since 2007, Burgess has actively participated in the formation of the European security research policy and the shaping of European research programmes, participating in policy formation working groups and projects in and around the European institutions. He was an active participant in ESRIF, the European Security Research and Innovation Forum, contributing directly to the main elements of its final report, published in 2009. He was a member of the European Security Research Programme Ethics Review Board (2012-2015). He has been a central member of the European Commission's Working Group on the Societal Impact of Security Research and authored a number of contributions to security research policy in the Seventh Framework Programme. He contributed to several European Commission advisory groups, Security, Science with and for Society (2013-2015), Ad hoc Gender (2013-2015), and Secure Societies (2013-2015) in preparation for the Horizon 2020 research programme.

He was a member of the Programme Committee of the Societal Security Programme of the Research Council of Norway (2012-2013), the Scientific Council Of the NATO Science for Peace Programme (2012-2015), the Groupe de Reflexion for the National Research Strategy for the French Ministry of Higher Education and Research (2013-2014), the Steering Committee of the Security Research Programme of the French National Agency for Research (2013-2014), and a member of the NORFACE Expert Group on Security and Integrity (2014). He is currently a member of the Scientific Council of the Flemish Peace Institute (2016- ).

== Bibliography ==
- Surveillance, Privacy and Security: Citizens’ Perspectives. (Co-edited with Rocco Bellanova, Johann Cas, Michael Friedewald and Walter Peissl). London, Routledge, 2016.
- Cultures of Governance and Peace: A Comparison of EU and Indian Theoretical and Policy Approaches. (with Oliver Richmond and Ranabir Samaddar). Manchester: Manchester University Press, 2016.
- The Ethical Subject of Security. Geopolitical Reason and the Threat against Europe. London: Routledge, 2011.
- A Threat Against Europe? Security, Immigration and Integration (with Serge Gutwirth). Brussels: VUB Press, 2011.
- Handbook of New Security Studies. London: Routledge, 2009.
- Promoting Human Security: Ethical, Normative and Educational Frameworks in Western Europe (collective). Paris: UNESCO, 2007.
- Ivar Aasen’s Logic of Nation. Toward a Philosophy of Culture. Volda: Volda University College Press, 1999. 2nd edition 2005.
- Museum Europa: The European Cultural Heritage between Economics and Politics. Kristiansand: Norwegian Academic Press, 2003.
- Den norske pastorale opplysningen. Nye perspektiver på norsk historiografi på 1800-talet (The Norwegian Pastoral Enlightenment: New Perspectives on Norwegian Historiography in the 19th Century) Oslo: Abstrakt Forlag, 2003.
- Nation, Modernity, Written Culture (with Odd Monsson). Kristiansand. Norwegian Academic Press, 2002.
- Den europeiske identiteten og den skandinaviske (European and Scandinavian Identity) (with Svein Ivar Angel & Bo Stråth). Volda: Volda University College skriftserie, 2001.
- European Security Identities. Contested Understandings of EU and NATO (with Ola Tunander), Oslo: PRIO, 2000.
- Cultural Politics and Political Culture in Postmodern Europe. Amsterdam/Atlanta, Georgia: Rodopi, 1997.
- Culture and Rationality. European Frameworks of Norwegian Identity. Oslo: Norwegian Academic Press, 2001.
- The Gender of Signs. Essays in Comparative Literature. Volda: Volda University College Press, 1995.
