= Welsh School (security studies) =

The Welsh School (sometimes the Aberystwyth School) also known as emancipatory realism is a school within the discipline of security studies. It is a critical approach that aims to link security to critical theory and which relies upon insights from the Frankfurt School and Gramscian thinking for its framework. Key academics considered part of the Welsh School include Ken Booth and Richard Wyn Jones.

== See also ==
- Critical Security Studies
- Copenhagen School (international relations)
- Paris School (Security Studies)
