= Caroline Thomas =

International Relations Academic

Caroline Thomas (1959 – 20 October 2008) was an international relations academic and a leading authority on the politics of development. Her work In Search of Security was an early contribution to the 'widening' debate within security studies.

== Selected works ==
- Global governance, development and human security : the challenge of poverty and inequality
- Global trade and global social issues
- In search of security : the Third World in international relations
- Globalization, human security, and the African experience
- New states, sovereignty, and intervention
- Conflict and consensus in South/North security
- Globalization and the South
- The environment in international relations
- Rio : unravelling the consequences
- The State and instability in the South

== See also ==
- Third World Security School
