= Danish Institute for International Studies =

Research institute in Denmark

The Danish Institute for International Studies (DIIS, Danish: Dansk Institut for Internationale Studier) is a public sector research institute for independent research and analysis of international affairs, financed primarily by the Danish state. DIIS conducts and communicates multidisciplinary research on globalization, security, development, and foreign policy.

DIIS has approximately 120 employees, both in research and support staff. Researchers have different academic backgrounds. DIIS contributes to the education of researchers at home and in developing countries, and work with relevant ministries for prolonged periods to qualify their knowledge of how DIIS research is used outside academic circles. The Institute performs and communicates basic research, research-based consulting, and commissioned work by the Danish Parliament, Ministries, NGOs, and other clients.

The legal foundation for DIIS states that the Institute must continuously assess Denmark's foreign policy and political situation and inform the Danish media, politicians, and the public about its findings.

DIIS was created in 2003 after the fusion of the former Center for Freds og Konfliktforskning, Copenhagen Peace Research Institute (COPRI), Center for Udviklingsforskning (CUF), Dansk Center for Holocaust og Folkedrabsstudier (DCHF) og Dansk Udenrigspolitisk Institut (DUPI). It was then part of Dansk Center for Internationale Studier og Menneskerettigheder (DCISM), which was closed in 2013, after which the institutes that were part of DCISM (one was DIIS) continued as separate centers.

DIIS is led by a board primarily from academia to ensure the Institute fulfills its scholarly obligations. The director is appointed by the board and advised by an internal Research Committee on the strategic planning of the Institute's research. DIIS is committed to the Principles of Research Integrity.

According to the law, the purpose of DIIS is to:

1. Conduct, promote, and coordinate independent research on international affairs.
2. Perform research and analysis as requested by the Danish Parliament, the government, or its initiative. Follow the international development to evaluate Denmark's foreign- and security political situation in a broad political and economic understanding, including Denmark's place with development policies.
3. Communicate research results, analysis, and knowledge and conduct documentation and information activities, including a public library, on international relations.
4. Participate in the education of researchers through cooperation with other research institutes, including supporting the development of research capacity in developing countries and supporting further education for the users of the Institute.
5. Act as a connector between Danish and international research environments within research on international affairs.

The Think Tanks and Civil Societies Program at the University of Pennsylvania ranks DIIS in the annual Go To Think Tank Index. The Institute is ranked consistently high; in 2017, DIIS was ranked fifth among research institutes in Western Europe, and in 2018, the index improved DIIS' ranking to fourth in Western Europe.

== See also ==
- Copenhagen Peace Research Institute
