= Third World Security School =

The Third World Security School is a name given to a school of thought in security studies that focuses on the security concerns of the so-called Third World. Roe cites Ayoob and Job as examples of academics whose scholarship belongs to this school. One of the first major statements of this school came from Caroline Thomas and her 1987 work In Search of Security.
