= Anita Inder Singh =

Political scientist

Anita Inder Singh is an international affairs analyst, who has published widely on democracy, human rights, diversity and integration in Europe and South Asia, the great powers in Asia, governance, international organisations, and development and security.

== Career ==
Professor Singh is one of the founding Professors of the Nelson Mandela Centre for Peace and Conflict Resolution at the Jamia Millia Islamia, a Muslim university in New Delhi. Prior to that she was a Fellow in the Department of International Relations at the London School of Economics and Political Science, and has taught International Relations at Oxford University. She has also been a Fellow at the Swedish Institute for International Affairs in Stockholm, and worked for the Independent Commission on International Humanitarian Issues in Geneva.

Anita Inder Singh has written for the OSCE Office of Democratic Institutions and Human Rights (OSCE/ODHIR) and UN/DESA.

== Publications ==
Her books include Democracy, Ethnic Diversity and Security in Post-Communist Europe Based on extensive travelling in the former Soviet Union and Eastern Europe the book showed that nationalism only leads to war if attempts are made to change state borders by force and that democracies are better at managing ethnic diversity than authoritarian states.

The Limits of British Influence: South Asia and the Anglo-American Relationship 1947-56. Based on official American archives in Washington DC, the papers of President Dwight D. Eisenhower in Abilene, Kansas, President Harry S. Truman in Independence, Missouri, and official British archives in London, this book shows how and why the US replaced Britain as the dominant foreign power in South Asia during the Cold War.

Her Oxford DPhil thesis, The Origins of the Partition of India, 1936-1947, was first published by Oxford University Press in 1987.

In an article in The Atlantic in 2003, Christopher Hitchens drew an analogy on the inevitability of partition between Anita Inder Singh’s book on Partition and Paul Scott’s Raj Quartet.

An abridged 25,000 word version of her book, The Partition of India, was published in English by the National Book Trust of India in 2006 and has been translated into nine Indian languages, including Kannada, Urdu, Oriya, Assamese, Gujarati, Telugu, Marathi, Punjabi and Hindi.

Anita Inder Singh has also published The United States, South Asia and the Global Anti-Terrorist Coalition. This book breaks new ground by exploring the significance of Afghanistan, Pakistan and India in the American-led international coalition against terrorism. Will the anti-terrorist strategies of the US establish that it is the world’s principal spoiler or a superpower upholding international norms and strengthening the capacity of international society to quash terrorism?

Anita Inder Singh’s articles have been published in The World Today and International Affairs (both connected with Chatham House, London), The Guardian, The Times Literary Supplement, the Far Eastern Economic Review and The Wall Street Journal Asia.

== Personal ==
She has lived in Sweden, India, Switzerland, Britain, United States, and Russia.
