= Geopolitics Quarterly =

International Quarterly of Geopolitics
- Discipline: Geopolitics
- Language: English
- Edited by: Mohammad Reza Hafeznia

Publication details
- History: 2005-present
- Publisher: Iranian Association of Geopolitics (Iran)
- Frequency: Quarterly

Standard abbreviations
- ISO 4: Int. Q. Geopolit.

Indexing
- ISSN: 1735-4331
- OCLC no.: 7831838828

Links
- Journal homepage

Geopolitics Quarterly is a peer-reviewed academic journal published by the Iranian Association of Geopolitics.

== Abstracting and indexing ==
The journal received Q1 Grade in the latest evaluation of the Islamic World Science Citation Center. The journal is abstracted and indexed in Scopus and the Islamic World Science and Technology Citation and Monitoring Institute.
