= Political security =

Political security is one of five sectors of analysis under the framework of the Copenhagen School of security studies.

As a Human Security Approach, the concept of political security was briefly defined in the 1994 Human Development Report (HDR) as the prevention of government repression, systematic human rights violations, and threats from militarisation, it has not been widely taken as a serious framework in scholarly or policy circles. The HDR's original intent was to establish an agenda protecting individuals from state-led repression, including political persecution, torture, and enforced disappearances. However, the notion of political security has since evolved more in response to immediate crises and the practical realities of international relations than in adherence to the HDR's initial parameters. In practice, discussions of political security have become intertwined with debates on humanitarian assistance and intervention. Throughout the 1990s, this largely focused on the legitimacy of humanitarian intervention, which later developed into the Responsibility to Protect (R2P) framework in the 2000s. By the second decade of the 21st century, however, it became evident that a more complex and nuanced approach was necessary to address the challenges associated with implementing political security in practice.

== China ==
In the People's Republic of China, the term political security (Chinese: 政治安全) has been used by security and intelligence agencies to refer to maintaining the rule of and countering threats to the Chinese Communist Party.
