= C.A.S.E. collective =

The C.A.S.E. Collective, meaning Critical Approaches to Security in Europe: A Networked Manifesto, is a group of critical scholars who have authored several academic articles relating to critical approaches to security in Europe.
