= Farzin (singer) =

Iranian pop artist

Farzin فرزین
- Born: Ali Kabir Takmilinejad (علی کبیر تکمیلی‌نژاد); 21 March 1952; Abadan, Iran
- Origin: Iranian
- Died: 3 September 1999 (aged 47) Bonn, Germany
- Genres: Persian pop
- Occupation: Singer
- Years active: 1971–1999

Ali Kabir Takmilinejad (Persian: علی کبیر تکمیلی‌نژاد; 1952–1999), better known as Farzin (فرزین), was an Iranian pop singer in the 1970s & 1980s.

== Biography ==
Farzin was a singer before the revolution of 1979. Farzin's first song was called "Mehman" (Persian: مهمان), written by Bijan Ghaderi. He was named 'Demis Roussos' of Iran. Before 1979 revolution Farzin worked with Aref in 'Sati Nik'. Sati Nik was Farzin and Aref hangout lovers. From that time musics, we can pointed to 'Dam Begirin' (Persian: دَم بگیرین) at that time, which made him more famous. Farzin left Iran and immigrated to the USA after 8 years silence in artwork in Iran and then He released his first album called "Gerye Nakon" (Persian: گریه نکن). He left the Los Angeles artwork and immigrated to Germany.

=== Personal life ===
Farzin has two children. His wife is unknown. Farzin died on 3 September 1999 due to a heart attack at his home in Germany. He was 47 years old. His body was buried in the cemetery behind his house in the presence of his loved ones. Farzin died when he was supposed to return to Iran a few months later, but due to his death, this did not happen.

== Albums ==
- Khoda Hafez (1976)
- Gerye Nakon (1984)
- Seda-ye Khaste (1986)
- Be Yad-e Dirouz (1987)
- Ma'shoughe (1988)
- Zeyno (1989)
- Eshgh (1990)
- Bi Rokh-e To (1994)
- Rah-e Iran (1998)
- Ashk (1999)
- Agar Soukhtim
