= Jaap de Wilde =

Dutch academic

Jacobus Hubertus "Jaap" de Wilde (born 17 May 1957) is a Dutch academic. A native of Zuidlaren, he has been a Professor of International Relations and Security Studies at the University of Groningen since 2007. He headed the department of International Relations between 2008 and 2012. From 2001 to 2007 he was professor in European Security Studies at the Department of Political Sciences, VU University Amsterdam, and from 1995–2007 he was senior research fellow in European Studies and IR Theory at the Centre for European Studies (CES), University of Twente. From 1993–1995 he worked at the Copenhagen Peace Research Institute (COPRI).

== Publications ==
- Monica den Boer and Jaap de Wilde, Eds. (2008), The Viability of Human Security, Amsterdam: Amsterdam University Press. Includes the article: "Speaking or Doing Human Security?"
- Jaap H. de Wilde (2008), Environmental Security Deconstructed, in: Hans Günter Brauch, et al., Eds. (2008), Globalisation and Environmental Challenges, Vol. 1, AFESS-Press, pp. 595–602.
- Jaap H. de Wilde (2006), Orwellian Risks in European Conflict Prevention Discourse, Global Society, Vol. 20, No. 1, pp. 87–99.
- Wouter G. Werner and Jaap H. de Wilde (2001), The Endurance of Sovereignty, The European Journal for International Relations, Vol. 7, No. 3, pp. 283–313.
- Barry Buzan, Ole Wæver and Jaap de Wilde (1998), Security: A New Framework for Analysis, London, Boulder: Lynne Rienner.
- Jaap de Wilde and Håkan Wiberg, Eds. (1996), Organized Anarchy in Europe: The Role of States and Intergovernmental Organizations, London: I.B. Tauris.
- Jaap H. de Wilde (1991), Saved from Oblivion: Interdependence Theory in the First Half of the Twentieth Century. A Study on the Causality between War and Complex Interdependence, Aldershot: Dartmouth.
