= Critical security studies =

Academic discipline

Critical security studies (CSS) is an academic discipline within security studies which draws on critical theory to revise and, at times, reject the narrow focus of mainstream approaches to security. Similarly to the case of critical international relations theory, critical security studies encompasses a wide range of theories including but not limited to: feminist, neo-Gramscian, Marxist, post-structuralist, postcolonial, and queer theory. Additionally, critical security studies, draws from a number of related disciplines such as sociology, anthropology, and criminology to find alternative routes to approach questions of security.

== Definition ==
Defining critical security studies can be difficult due to the wide range of theories involved, meaning that any single definition is likely to exclude works and scholars who would list themselves, or be listed by most scholars as part of the subfield. Due to this, most definitions of critical security studies focus on listing shared components rather than create a single definition. Browning and McDonald argue that critical security studies entails three main components: the first is a rejection of conventional (particularly realist) approaches to security, rejecting or critiquing the theories, epistemology, and implications of realism, such as the total focus on the role of the state when approaching questions of security. The second is that of critically examining the meaning of security and the politics surrounding it, in particular the "function of representations or discourses of security in defining group identity, enabling particular policy or legitimating particular actors as security providers." One such example of this is that of the Copenhagen School and their theory of securitization. The third component, is that of critically examining the ethics and approaches inherent to the study of security. More recent topics of concern include environmental and planetary, health, ontological, border or everyday security.

== Uses of the term ==
The term "critical security studies" is most often used to refer to some variation of the above definition of critical security studies, as a subfield of security studies or a set of alternative paradigms within that field. However, it has also been used to refer to a specific strand of approaches within this subfield, which has as its most characteristic element a commitment to emancipatory theory that is not shared by other critical approaches to security. The authors representing this latter view, such as Ken Booth and Richard Wyn Jones, are usually referred to as the Aberystwyth or Welsh School to avoid ambiguity.

== See also ==
- Critical theory
- Critical international relations theory
- Copenhagen School (international relations)
- Welsh School (security studies)
- International political sociology
- Postmodernism (international relations)
