= British Journal of Middle Eastern Studies =

- Discipline: Middle Eastern studies
- Language: English
- Edited by: Lloyd Ridgeon

Publication details
- Former name: British Society for Middle Eastern Studies. Bulletin
- History: 1974-present
- Publisher: Routledge on behalf of the British Society for Middle Eastern Studies (United Kingdom)
- Frequency: 5/year
- Impact factor: 0.857 (2019)

Standard abbreviations
- ISO 4: Br. J. Middle East. Stud.

Indexing
- ISSN: 1353-0194 (print); 1469-3542 (web)
- LCCN: 92648923
- OCLC no.: 924715964

Links
- Journal homepage; Online access; Online archive

The British Journal of Middle Eastern Studies is a peer-reviewed academic journal published by Routledge on behalf of the British Society for Middle Eastern Studies. It was established in 1974 as the British Society for Middle Eastern Studies Bulletin and obtained its current title in 1991.

== Abstracting and indexing ==
The journal is abstracted and indexed in:

- Arts and Humanities Citation Index
- EBSCO databases
- GEOBASE
- International Bibliography of the Social Sciences
- Modern Language Association Database
- ProQuest databases
- Scopus
- Social Sciences Citation Index

According to the Journal Citation Reports, the journal has a 2019 impact factor of 0.857.
