= A Matter of Fact =

Short story by Rudyard Kipling

- Short story by Rudyard Kipling
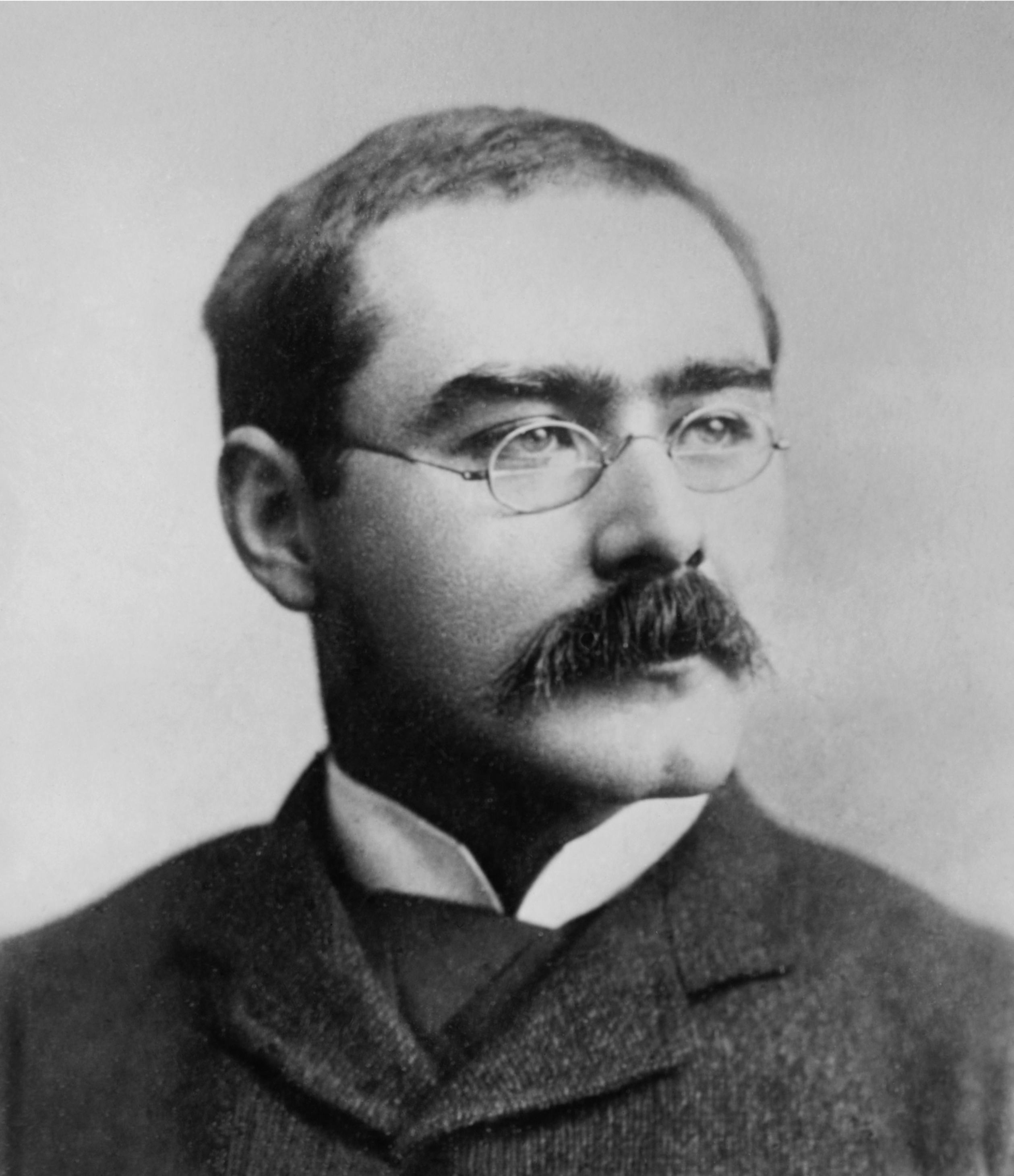
- Country: United Kingdom
- Language: English
- Genre: Short story

Publication

"A Matter of Fact" is a short story by Rudyard Kipling, first appearing in January 1892 in the magazine People. It was published the next year in the collection Many Inventions.

== Plot ==
The narrator, presumably Kipling, is a journalist sailing home from South Africa to England. Aboard the steamer are two other passengers he meets, fellow journalists with whom he spends his time. During a thick fog, the pilot experienced an unusual difficulty in steering, owing to strong unnatural currents, which have apparently been caused by a volcanic eruption in the seabed. A resultant colossal wave nearly upsets their vessel, sinking another nearby, and also spews up a great sea monster from the deeps, mortally wounded. It first manifests as an eerie white face, blind and framed in the fog, and the three journalists look on bemused as the monster's mate surfaces, watches him die, and sinks down again to the seabed.

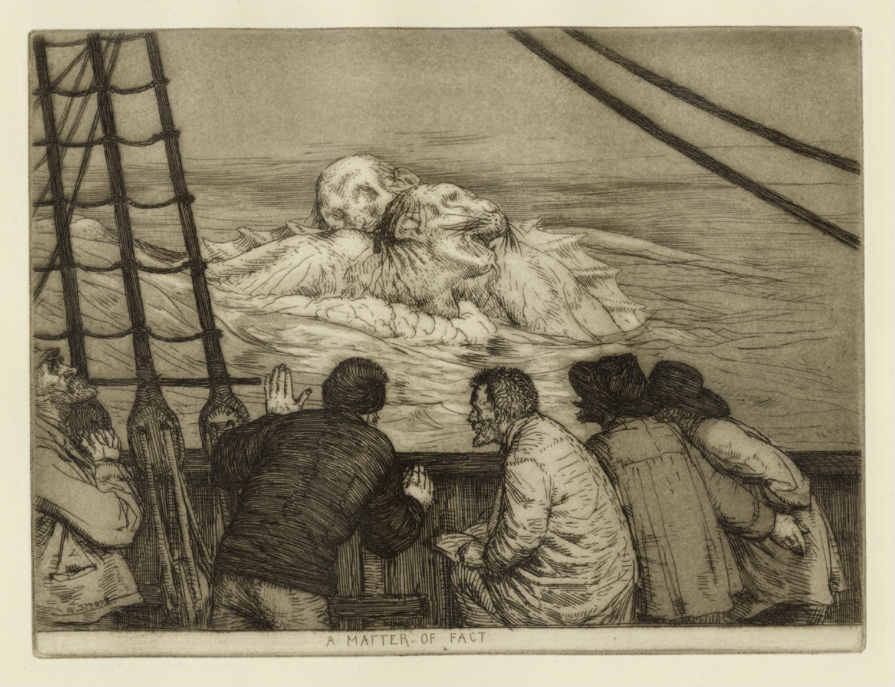
William Strang etching for the story

When the sea is quiet again, the three journalists discuss how they can present this astonishing fact to the public. The Dutch journalist, Zuyland, determines to treat the matter in cool scientific fashion, "giving approximate lengths and breadths, and the whole list of the crew whom he had sworn on oath to testify to his facts". However, both he and Kipling soon discard their accounts, realising that their story will never be credited as a simple fact. The American journalist, Keller, also realises the futility of presenting such a story to the cynical public, and in the end Kipling tells them he will print the story as a piece of fiction, where it will get a better reception. Truth, he says, "is a naked lady, and if by accident she is drawn up from the bottom of the sea, it behoves a gentleman either to give her a print petticoat or to turn his back and vow that he did not see".

== Recording by Kipling ==
A small fragment of the story, read by Kipling himself, was recorded by French researcher Jean Poirot in 1921.

== Critical reception ==
The reaction to the story was mixed. Some complained that the ending wanted polish and was unrealistic. Other contemporary critics lauded the work as a forerunner of English scientifiction.
