= Copenhagen Peace Research Institute =

The Copenhagen Peace Research Institute (COPRI) was a Danish research institute established in 1985 by the Danish Parliament. Its aim was to support and strengthen multidisciplinary research on peace and security. Established as an independent institute, in 1996 it became a government research institute under the Ministry of Research and Information Technology. In January 2003, COPRI was merged into the Danish Institute for International Studies (DIIS).

Many members of the Copenhagen School of international relations were associated with COPRI, including Ole Wæver and Barry Buzan.
