= Barry Buzan =

British professor of international relations

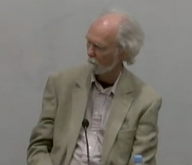
- Buzan in 2019 on a panel at the University of London

Personal details
- Born: Barry Gordon Buzan; 28 April 1946 (age 80) London, England
- Spouse: Deborah Skinner
- Relatives: B. F. Skinner (father-in-law)

Barry Gordon Buzan, FBA, FAcSS (born 28 April 1946) is a British political scientist. He is an emeritus Professor of International Relations at the London School of Economics and an honorary professor at the University of Copenhagen and Jilin University. Until 2012 he was Montague Burton Professor of International Relations at the LSE. Buzan sketched the Regional Security Complex Theory and is therefore together with Ole Wæver a central figure of the Copenhagen School.

== Career ==
From 1988 to 2002 he was Project Director at the Copenhagen Peace Research Institute (COPRI). From 1995 to 2002 he was research Professor of International Studies at the University of Westminster, and before that Professor of International Studies at the University of Warwick. During 1993 he was visiting professor at the International University of Japan, and in 1997–8 he was Olof Palme Visiting professor in Sweden.

He was Chairman of the British International Studies Association 1988–90, vice-president of the (North American) International Studies Association 1993–4, and founding Secretary of the International Studies Coordinating Committee 1994–8. From 1999 to 2011 he was the general coordinator of a project to reconvene the English school of international relations theory, and from 2004 to 2008 he was editor of the European Journal of International Relations. In 1998 he was elected a fellow of the British Academy, and in 2001 he was elected to the Academy of Learned Societies for the Social Sciences.

== Research interests ==
Buzan defines his interests as:

1. the conceptual and regional aspects of international security;
2. international history, and the evolution of the international system since prehistory;
3. international relations theory, particularly structural realism;
4. international society, and the 'English School' approach to International Relations.

Buzan was a major contributor to the Copenhagen School of political thought, connecting the concept of securitization to the regional security complex theory.

Buzan's 1983 text People, States and Fear had a significant impact on criticism of the prevailing state-centric views of the international system. Buzan contended that understandings of national security should be broadened to address systemic concerns involving individuals, states, and the entire international system. In this view, economic, social, and environmental factors of security should be considered in addition to political and military aspects of security.

== Personal life ==
Buzan was born in London, but his family emigrated to Canada in 1954. He holds Canadian and United Kingdom citizenship. He attended Kitsilano Secondary School in Vancouver, British Columbia. Buzan is a graduate of the University of British Columbia (1968) where he started an uncompleted master programme. He received his doctorate at the London School of Economics (1973). He describes his political views as social democratic and his religious views as extreme secularist.

Buzan's wife, Deborah Skinner, is an artist and youngest daughter of psychologist B. F. Skinner. They have no children. His brother was author Tony Buzan, with whom he co-authored The Mind Map Book.

== Works ==
- Seabed politics (1976)
- A Sea of Troubles? :Sources of dispute in the new ocean regime (1978)
- People, States and Fear (1983)
- South Asian Insecurity and the Great Powers (1986) with Gowher Rizvi, Rosemary Foot, Nancy Jetly, B. A. Roberson, Anita Inder Singh
- An Introduction to Strategic Studies: Military Technology and International Relations (1987)
- The European security order recast : scenarios for the Post-Cold War Era (1990) with Morten Kelstrup; Pierre Lemaitre; Elzbieta Tromer; Ole Waever
- The Logic of Anarchy: Neorealism to Structural Realism (1993) with Charles Jones and Richard Little
- Security: A New Framework for Analysis (1997) with Ole Waever, Jaap De Wilde
- The Arms Dynamic in World Politics (1998) with Eric Herring
- Anticipating the future: Twenty Millennia of Human Progress (1998) with Gerald Segal
- The Mind Map Book (2000) with Tony Buzan
- International Systems in World History: Remaking the Study of International Relations (2000) with Richard Little
- Regions and Powers: The Structure of International Security (2003) with Ole Waever
- The United States and the Great Powers: World Politics in the Twenty-First Century (2004)
- From International to World Society? English School Theory and the Social Structure of Globalisation (2004)
- The Evolution of International Security Studies (2009) with Lene Hansen.
- Non-Western International Relations Theory: Perspectives on and beyond Asia (2010) editor with Amitav Acharya.
- An Introduction to the English School of International Relations: The Societal Approach (2014).
- The Global Transformation: History, Modernity and the Making of International Relations (2015) with George Lawson
- Global International Society: A New Framework for Analysis (2018) with Laust Schouenborg
- The Making of Global International Relations: Origins and Evolution of IR at its Centenary (2019) with Amitav Acharya
- Rethinking Sino-Japanese Alienation: History Problems and Historical Opportunities (2020) with Evelyn Goh
- Re-imagining International Relations: World Orders in the Thought and Practice of Indian, Chinese, and Islamic Civilizations (2021) with Amitav Acharya
- Making Global Society: A Study of humankind across Three Eras (2023)
- The Market in Global International Society (2024) with Robert Falkner
- Timelines for Modernity: Rethinking Periodization for Global International Relations (2025)

== Awards ==
Buzan won the American Society of International Law's 1982 Francis Deak Prize for his article Navigating by Consensus: Developments in the Technique at the United Nations Conference on the Law of the Sea.
