= Copenhagen School (international relations) =

School of academic thought

The Copenhagen School of security studies is a school of academic thought with its origins in international relations theorist Barry Buzan's book People, States and Fear: The National Security Problem in International Relations, first published in 1983. The School places particular emphasis on the non-military aspects of security, representing a shift away from traditional security studies. Theorists associated with the school include Buzan, Ole Wæver, and Jaap de Wilde. Many of the school's members worked at the Copenhagen Peace Research Institute, from which its name originates.

The primary book of the Copenhagen School is Security: A New Framework for Analysis, authored by Buzan, Wæver and De Wilde.

== Origins ==
The approach is associated with constructivism.

== Sectors ==
The concept of 'sectors' concerns the different arenas where we speak of security. The list of sectors is primarily an analytical tool created to spot different dynamics. In Security: A New Framework for Analysis, the authors list the following sectors: military/state, political, societal, economic, and environmental. As such, CS theory can be regarded as "widening" traditional security studies by looking at security in these 'new' sectors.

== Regional security ==
The concept of regional security complexes covers how security is clustered in geographically shaped regions. Security concerns do not travel well over distances and threats are therefore most likely to occur in the region. The security of each actor in a region interacts with the security of the other actors. There is often intense security interdependence within a region, but not between regions, which is what defines a region and what makes regional security an interesting area of study. Insulator states sometimes isolate regions; an example is Afghanistan's location between the Middle East and South Asia. Insulators mark boundaries of indifference, where security dynamics stand back to back. They contrast with the traditional idea of "buffer states" which are located at points where security dynamics are intense (e.g. Belgium between Germany and France). Regions should be regarded as mini-systems in which all other international relations (IR) theories can be applied, such as balance of power theory, polarity, interdependence, alliance systems, etc.

Regional security complex theory should not be confused with regionalism, a subset of IR from the 1970s concerned mostly with regional integration.

== Securitization ==
Securitization, developed by Ole Wæver, is probably the most prominent concept of the Copenhagen School, and the one that has generated the most literature. Wæver argued that 'security' is a speech act with distinct consequences in the context over international politics. By making use of speech act a (state) actor tries to move a topic away from politics into an area of security concerns thereby legitimating extraordinary means against the socially constructed threat. The process of securitization is intersubjective meaning that it is neither a question of an objective threat or a subjective perception of a threat. Instead securitization of a subject depends on an audience accepting a securitization move, undertaken by the securitizing actor.

Some of the most detailed books on the subject are:

- Understanding Global Security, Peter Hough, Routledge, 2004
- Barry Buzan, People, States and Fear, ECPR, 2007
- The Empire of Security, William Bain, Routledge, 2006
- Contemporary Security Studies, Alan Collins, Oxford, 2022

== Criticism ==
A criticism that has been advanced against the Copenhagen School is that it is a Eurocentric approach to security. Realists have also argued that the Copenhagen School's widening of the security agenda risks giving the discipline of security studies "intellectual incoherence". Lene Hansen has criticized the absence of gender in the Copenhagen School's approach. Her critique also called for the inclusion of both visual and bodily acts as modes of articulating (in)security. Other critiques focus on the role of the security analyst and the potentially conservative nature of the theory.

== See also ==
- Welsh School (Security Studies)
- Paris School (Security Studies)
- Critical Security Studies
- Third World Security School
