= Ole Wæver =

Danish international relations scholar

- Occupation: International relations scholar
- Employer: University of Copenhagen

Ole Wæver (born 17 September 1960) is a professor of international relations at the Department of Political Science, University of Copenhagen. He has published extensively in the field of international relations, and is one of the main architects of the Copenhagen School in International Relations.

Prior to joining the University of Copenhagen, Wæver was a senior research fellow at Copenhagen Peace Research Institute (1985–1999). His areas of research include:

- Theories of international relations
- The study of conflicts, what creates the conflict and how to mediate and resolve them
- Danish security and defence policy
- The history of concepts
- Security theory
- Post-structural realism

Wæver was a member of the Danish Government's Commission on Security and Disarmament Affairs between 1993 and 1995 and the replacement of the institute, the Danish Institute of International Affairs (DUPI), between 1995 and 2002. He is a member of the editorial board for European Journal of International Affairs, Security Dialogue, International Studies Perspectives and the Cambridge Review of International Affairs. Waever was also the co-founder of the Centre for the Resolution of International Conflicts (CRIC) at the University of Copenhagen.

Wæver is director of the Danish Ph.D. school, Politologisk Forskerskole. He has written several pieces together with Barry Buzan. These include the two books:

- Regions and Powers: The Structure of International Security, Cambridge University Press 2003.
- Barry Buzan, Ole Wæver, and Jaap de Wilde, Security: A New Framework for Analysis, Boulder CO: Lynne Rienner Publishers 1998.

Wæver has also co-edited the following book with Iver B. Neumann: The Future of International Relations: Masters In The Making? London: Routledge, 1997.
