= Tønnesson =

Tønnesson is a Norwegian surname, 'son of Tønnes'. Notable people with the surname include:

- Kåre Tønnesson (1926–2019), Norwegian historian
- Stein Tønnesson (born 1953), Norwegian historian
