= Henrik Urdal =

Norwegian political scientist

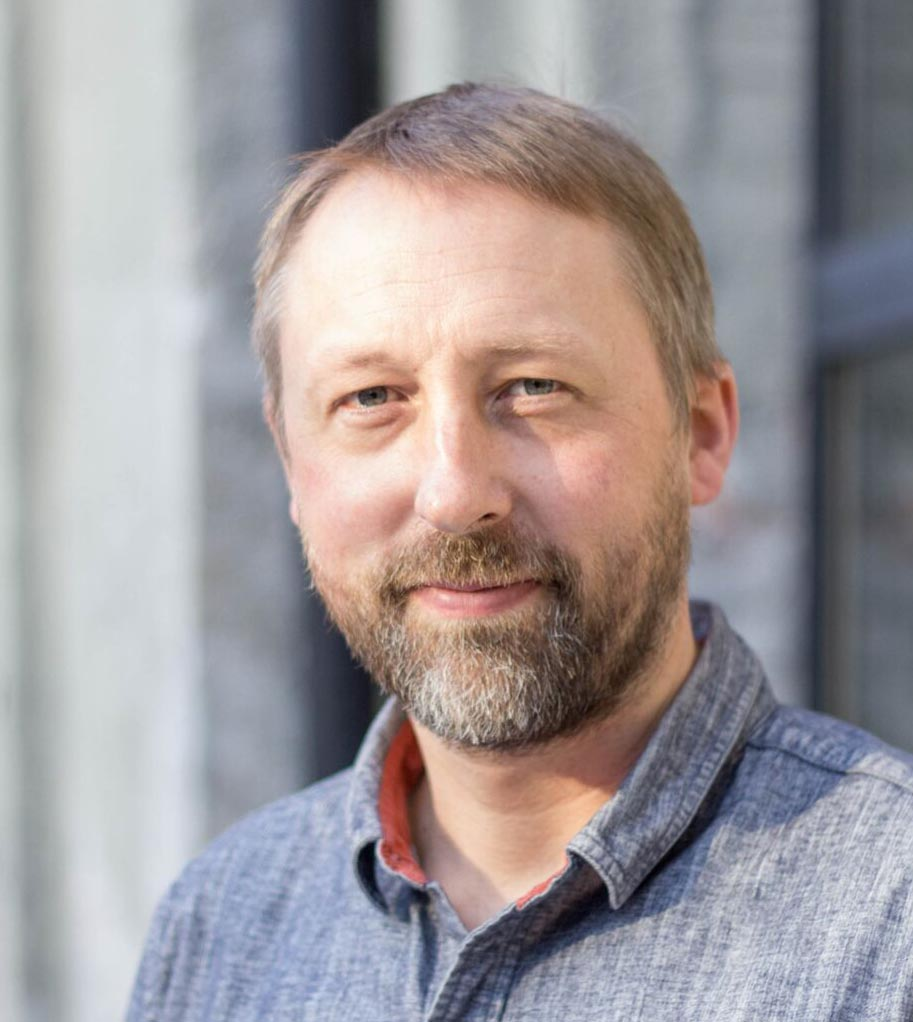
- Born: October 19, 1972 (age 53)
- Education: PhD in political science
- Alma mater: University of Oslo
- Scientific career
- Fields: Political science, Political Demography, Peace and Conflict Studies
- Institutions: Peace Research Institute Oslo

Director of Peace Research Institute Oslo
- Incumbent
- Assumed office July 2017
- Preceded by: Kristian Berg Harpviken

Henrik Urdal (born 19 October 1972) is a Norwegian political scientist and the current director of the Peace Research Institute Oslo (PRIO). Before his appointment as director in 2017 he was a research professor and research director at the institute. He was editor-in-chief of the Journal of Peace Research, the premier journal in the field, from 2010 to 2017.

== Research interests ==
Urdal's research interests include the relationship between demography, environment, and politics, particularly focusing on how population growth, youth bulge theory, and climate change affect violent conflict.

== Education and work experience ==
Since 2000, Urdal has been affiliated with PRIO, first as a student, then moving on to positions as researcher, senior researcher, Research Professor and Research Director. Urdal received his Research Professor competence in 2013. He obtained his PhD in political science from the University of Oslo in 2007, entitled Demography and Internal Armed Conflict. Urdal was a PRIO board member 2013-15.

Urdal is the Research Director at the Department on Conditions of Violence and Peace where he heads the Conflict Trend project. PRIO’s Conflict Trends project collaborates with the Norwegian Ministry of Foreign Affairs to answer questions relating to the causes, consequences and trends in conflict. He was a researcher with the Centre for the Study of Civil War (CSCW) – one of the 13 original Norwegian Centres of Excellence – from the beginning in 2003 and throughout its 10 years of existence.

Urdal has held research fellowships at the Kennedy School of Government (Harvard University; 2011–12) and East West Center (Honolulu, Hawaii; 2005-2006).

He has previously worked for the Office of the Prosecutor at the International Criminal Tribunal for the former Yugoslavia (1999).

Urdal has previously been Associate Editor (2006–10), Editorial Committee Member (2004–06), Book Review Editor (2004–05) for the Journal of Peace Research.

Henrik was the Secretary General of the Socialist Youth League (Sosialistisk Ungdom) of Norway (1996–98) and worked as a research assistant, at Statistics Norway, at the Division for Social and Demographic Research (1995).

Henrik was a board member of the Norwegian Demographic Society (2011–12),

== Publications (selected) ==
Gudrun Østby; Henrik Urdal & Ida Rudolfsen, (2017) What is driving gender equality in secondary education? Education Research International: forthcoming.

Gudrun Østby; Henrik Urdal & Ida Rudolfsen (2016) What Is Driving Gender Equality in Secondary Education? Evidence from 57 Developing Countries, 1970–2010, Education Research International.

Håvard Strand & Henrik Urdal (2014) Hear nothing, see nothing, say nothing: Can states reduce the risk of armed conflict by banning census data on ethnic groups?, International Area Studies Review 17(2): 167–183.

Henrik Urdal & Chi, Primus Che (2013) War and Gender Inequalities in Health: The Impact of Armed Conflict on Fertility and Maternal Mortality, International Interactions39(4): 489–510.

Håvard Hegre; Joakim Karlsen; Håvard Mokleiv Nygård; Håvard Strand & Henrik Urdal (2013) Predicting Armed Conflict, 2010–2050, International Studies Quarterly 57(2): 250–270.

Halvard Buhaug & Henrik Urdal (2013) An urbanization bomb? Population growth and social disorder in cities, Global Environmental Change 23(1): 1–10.

Henrik Urdal& Kristian Hoelscher (2012) Explaining Urban Social Disorder and Violence: An Empirical Study of Event Data from Asian and Sub-Saharan African Cities, International Interactions 38(4): 512–528.

Henrik Urdal (2008) Population, Resources and Violent Conflict: A Sub-National Study of India 1956–2002, Journal of Conflict Resolution 52(4): 590–617.

Clionadh Raleigh; & Henrik Urdal (2007) Climate Change, Environmental Degradation and Armed Conflict, Political Geography 26(6): 674–694.

Henrik Urdal(2006) A Clash of Generations? Youth Bulges and Political Violence, International Studies Quarterly 50(3): 607–630.

== Dissemination ==
Henrik Urdal holds policy relevant consultancies for various international and Norwegian organizations and institutions, such as the World Bank, UNESCO and Norwegian Ministry of Foreign Affairs.
