= Income inequality in China =

The economy of the People's Republic of China has a high degree of income inequality. According to the Asian Development Bank Institute, "before China implemented reform and opening-up policies in 1978, its income distribution pattern was characterized as egalitarian in all aspects."

A study published in the Proceedings of the National Academy of Sciences of the United States of America (PNAS) estimated that China's Gini coefficient increased from 0.30 to 0.55 between 1980 and 2002. At this time, the Gini coefficient for rural–urban inequality was only 0.16. As of 2019, the official Gini coefficient in China was 0.465; inequality was at its highest in the 2000s, with numerous sources reporting a significant decline in the 2010s.

== History ==
In a landmark paper published in the Review of Development Economics, economists Ravi Kanbur and Xiaobo Zhang conclude that there have been three peaks of inequality in China in the last fifty years, "coinciding with the Great Famine of the late 1950s, the Cultural Revolution of the late 1960s and 1970s, and finally the period of openness and global integration in the late 1990s." Their research indicates that these periods of inequality are driven by "three key policy variables – the ratio of heavy industry to gross output value, the degree of decentralization, and the degree of openness." The study finds that the "heavy-industry development strategy played a key role in forming the enormous rural-urban gap in the pre-reform period, while openness and decentralization contributed to the rapid increase in inland-coastal disparity in the reform period of the 1980s and 90s." In other words, heavy industry development in the cities formed the initial rural-urban gap leading up to the reform period, and decentralization increased overall inequality, rural-urban inequality, and inland-coastal inequality as the economy opened up after the 1978 reform and opening up. Research conducted by Jeffrey Sachs on the entire period from 1952 to 1996 indicates that in general, regional income inequalities are driven by government policy, whereas income divergence is "strongly associated with the extent of marketization and openness."

== Current state ==
China is a newly industrialized country and an emerging economy, with quarterly GDP growth rates averaging 9.31% for the past two decades, powered mainly by strong exports. However, China still faces a number of socioeconomic issues, including the increasing income disparity between different groups of citizens, largely characterized by rural-urban income inequality. Despite steady growth of China's economy since economic reforms in 1978, the rural-urban income gap reached its widest in more than three decades in 2009. According to data from National Bureau of Statistics of China, at its widest disparity, city dwellers were earning 3.33 times as much as farmers (income ratio of 3.33:1), with per capita disposable income of urban households standing at RMB 17175 while per capita net income of rural households at RMB 5153. In contrast, the income disparity was at its narrowest in 1983, at 1.82:1, due to effects of the Household-responsibility system introduced in 1978. As of year 2010, income ratio was recorded at 3.23:1 and per capita disposable income of urban households stood at RMB 19109 while rural households' were at RMB 5919. In 2014, according to an Institute of Social Science Survey, Peking University, income inequality among mainland Chinese citizens has reached severe conditions, with 1% of the Chinese population possessing 1/3 of the country's wealth. The existing high income inequality in China is primarily attributed to structural factors inherent in the Chinese political system, with the principal structural drivers being the urban-rural disparity and regional disparities in economic prosperity.

In 2012, a report published by Southwestern University of Finance and Economics estimated the Gini index of China at 0.61

China's government publishes an official yearly calculation of the country's Gini index. Beginning in 2008, China's Gini coefficient has decreased. According to these reports, the average Gini coefficient between residents was .475 between the years of 2003 and 2018, reaching a high of 0.491 in 2008 and a low of 0.462 in 2015. In 2019, China's official Gini coefficient was 0.465; various sources have debated the accuracy of this data, with the World Bank calculating 0.385 (2016) after factoring cheaper prices in rural areas while the World Inequality Database reporting higher numbers after factoring in pre-tax income and unreported income of richer segments. However, it is generally agreed among sources that China's inequality decreased significantly in the 2010s.

Despite income inequality in China, the absolute income of nearly all income groups has risen quickly. From 1988 to 2018, China's rural and urban populations had per capita increases in real income (i.e., accounting for inflation) of 8–10 times.

== Factors ==
=== Urban-biased policies ===
More than 10% of China's total inequality is attributed to the rural-urban gap, according to a study published in the PNAS. Research conducted by Dennis Tao Yang published in the journal of the American Economic Association indicates that the root of China's rural-urban divide "lies in the strategy of the centrally planned system that favored heavy-industry development and extracted agricultural surplus largely for urban capital accumulation and urban-based subsidies." In the 1980s and 1990s, state investments in the rural economy accounted for "less than 10 percent of the budget, despite the fact that the rural population was about 73-76 percent of the national population." Additionally, factor market distortions have created significant rural-urban inequalities. More specifically, research published in the Journal of Economic Modelling demonstrates that the Hukou system and absence of a fully functioning land market are two main drivers of rural-urban inequality.

Social security payments to urban workers is significantly greater than payments to rural farmers, which further contributes to inequality.

=== Inland-coastal inequality ===
As is well documented in many studies, rural-urban inequality is a major contributing factor to general income inequality in China. However, "while the contribution of rural-urban inequality is much higher than that of inland-coastal inequality in terms of levels, the trend is very different. The rural-urban contribution has not changed very much over time, but the inland-coastal contribution has increased by several fold," meaning that inland-coastal inequality is playing an increasingly important role in the formation of general income inequality across China. A study found that variations across Chinese provinces account for about 12% of the country's overall income inequality. Research on economic growth after the opening of the Chinese economy has shown that between 1989 and 2004, income in coastal provinces more than tripled whilst that in inland provinces doubled. Research on inland-coastal inequality indicates that "since being a coastal province is a geographic advantage that will persist, this tendency for divergence will also probably continue," but institutional factors still have a significant effect. Economists Ravi Kanbur and Xiao Zhang propose that the "greater ease of rural-to-urban migration within provinces, compared to the institutional and other difficulties of migrating from inland to coastal provinces" can partially explain this phenomenon. China's Hukou system is an institutional factor that significantly inhibits interprovincial migration. Recently, the government has introduced policies that relax Hukou related restrictions in small and medium-sized cities, in an effort to encourage growth. In 2005, it was recorded that rural incomes were less equally distributed than urban incomes, but urban inequality was rising faster than rural inequality.

=== Education ===
According to research conducted at the World Bank, "inequality of access to education is an important source of inequality in China across people contemporaneously and across generations." In fact, "a decomposition analysis based on household income determination shows that the largest proportion of changes in total income can be attributed to the increase in returns to education." Urban-biased policies and inland-coastal inequality exacerbates the issue of education inequality in China. One of the primary issues is their generation of sector-biased income transfers and expenditures on health, housing and education, which "not only distort economic incentives of the workers in the sectors, but will also affect the human-capital attainments of their children, which may further widen the rural-urban income gap." In other words, inland and rural inequality can help create a vicious cycle by funneling money towards the coastal cities and away from investments in human capital elsewhere. Like in the United States, education funding is primarily the responsibility of local governments in China. As poor localities are less able to fund these services and poor households are less able to afford the high cost of basic education, China has seen an increase in inequality of education outcomes. For example, in 1998, per pupil expenditure in Beijing was 12 times that in Guizhou, and the difference had jumped to 15 times by 2001.

=== Demographic change ===
According to research published in the China Economic Review, population aging is "largely responsible for the sharp increase in income inequality in rural China," especially at the beginning of the 2000s. As a result of Chinese governmental attempts to control population growth with the one-child policy implemented in 1979, many fewer young adults have reached the working age over the course of the past decade, leading to a significant "fall in the ratio of household members of working age." This created a labor shortage, which in combination with the rapid expansion of industrialization served to increase income inequality.

=== Assets from parents' generation ===
For Chinese born in the 1980s and 1990s, parental wealth and income has had an increased impact on inequality. Inequality widened in their parents' generation particularly as income from assets (as opposed to income from labor) began to account for an increasing share of income. This was driven in significant part by the growing importance of real estate in the economy. Unlike forms of human capital, physical assets like real estate may be passed from generation to generation to continue to produce income.

== Impact ==
In December 2009, a survey conducted by the Economy and Nation Weekly magazine of state media outlet Xinhua News Agency revealed that 34 out of the 50 leading Chinese economists surveyed see income inequality as a challenge to China's sustainable development. Economist Kenneth Rogoff also cautioned on the problem of income inequality, commenting that "There is no doubt that income inequality is the single biggest threat to social stability around the world, whether it is in the United States, the European periphery, or China." It has been argued that income inequality is a menace to social stability, and that a shrinking of middle class capital could impede China's economic growth.

A 2024 study by Stanford University and Center for Strategic and International Studies showed increasing discontent in China with income inequality and with a perceived "unfair economic system" in comparison to past decades.

== Policy recommendations ==
=== Economic reform ===
Research published by the International Monetary Fund indicates that "continuing with the current growth pattern would further increase already high investment and saving needs to unsustainable levels, lower urban employment growth, and widen the rural-urban income gap." Instead, they recommend reducing subsidies to industry and investment, encouraging the development of the services industry, and reducing barriers to labor mobility, believing that this would result in a "more balanced growth with an investment-to-GDP ratio that is consistent with medium-term saving trends, faster growth in urban employment, and a substantial reduction in the income gap between rural and urban residents." With regard to labor mobility reform, research published in the journal of Economic Modelling suggests that reforms in the rural land rental market and Hukou system alongside efforts to increase off-farm labor mobility would dramatically reduce the urban-rural income ratio. Additionally, the research states that "the combination of WTO accession and factor market reforms improves both efficiency and equality significantly." WTO accession means that the economy will become more liberalized and open, "likely resulting in dramatic shifts in regional comparative advantages." This regional disparity will likely be exacerbated by continued government investment in coastal regions, so "further liberalizing and investing in the economy in the inland region is thus an important developmental strategy for the government to both promote economic growth and reduce regional inequality."

=== Social policy reform ===
Analysis of the impact of the one-child policy indicates that "population aging will impact society in multiple ways, and it is therefore crucial for policy makers to produce a development strategy that tackles the socio-economic challenges of an aging population." Some specific recommendations from the School of Public Finance and Public Policy of Beijing include "the establishment of a basic old age security system in rural areas" to reduce income inequality, encouragement of development of local industry in less affluent regions, subsidization of children's education in lower income households, and the establishment of public health insurance plans for the poor." Additionally, the report finds that "In the long run, the Chinese government should reconsider whether the one-child policy should be continued. As an interim policy, it has achieved its objective, and now is the time for adjusting the policy." Research from the World Bank indicates that while inequality of income can be inevitable at certain stages of development, inequality of opportunity will undermine long-term development prospects. In order to enhance growth and fight poverty, it will therefore be important to improve access to basic education, especially in poor rural areas.

=== Fiscal policy reform ===
China already has a tax and redistribution system. It is divided into 9 income groups. The first bracket for salaries exceeding 800 yuan (or US$96.4) is taxed at 5%, the last bracket for incomes exceeding 100,000 yuan (or US$12,000) is taxed at 45%. There is also a tax system for craftsmen. This one is based on 5 tranches and not 9. The highest rate is 35%. However, it seems that this tax system cannot really be effective in reducing inequalities. This is for several reasons. China faces significant corruption problems that make this tax system illegitimate and difficult to enforce. Tax payers consider that the taxes they pay will go to a privileged minority, which is why, in practice, this tax system is not legitimate.

In August 2018, the government amended the laws on individual income tax to allow for itemized deductions from taxable income, including for education expenses and medical expenses. The 2018 amendments also increased the threshold at which point income was taxable. The rationale was that these changes would reduce the tax burden on low income families and make the tax system fairer.

== See also ==
- Economic inequality in China
- Economy of China
- Income distribution in China
- Income tax in China
- Poverty in China
- Social issues in China
