= Scott Gates (academic) =

Scott G. Gates
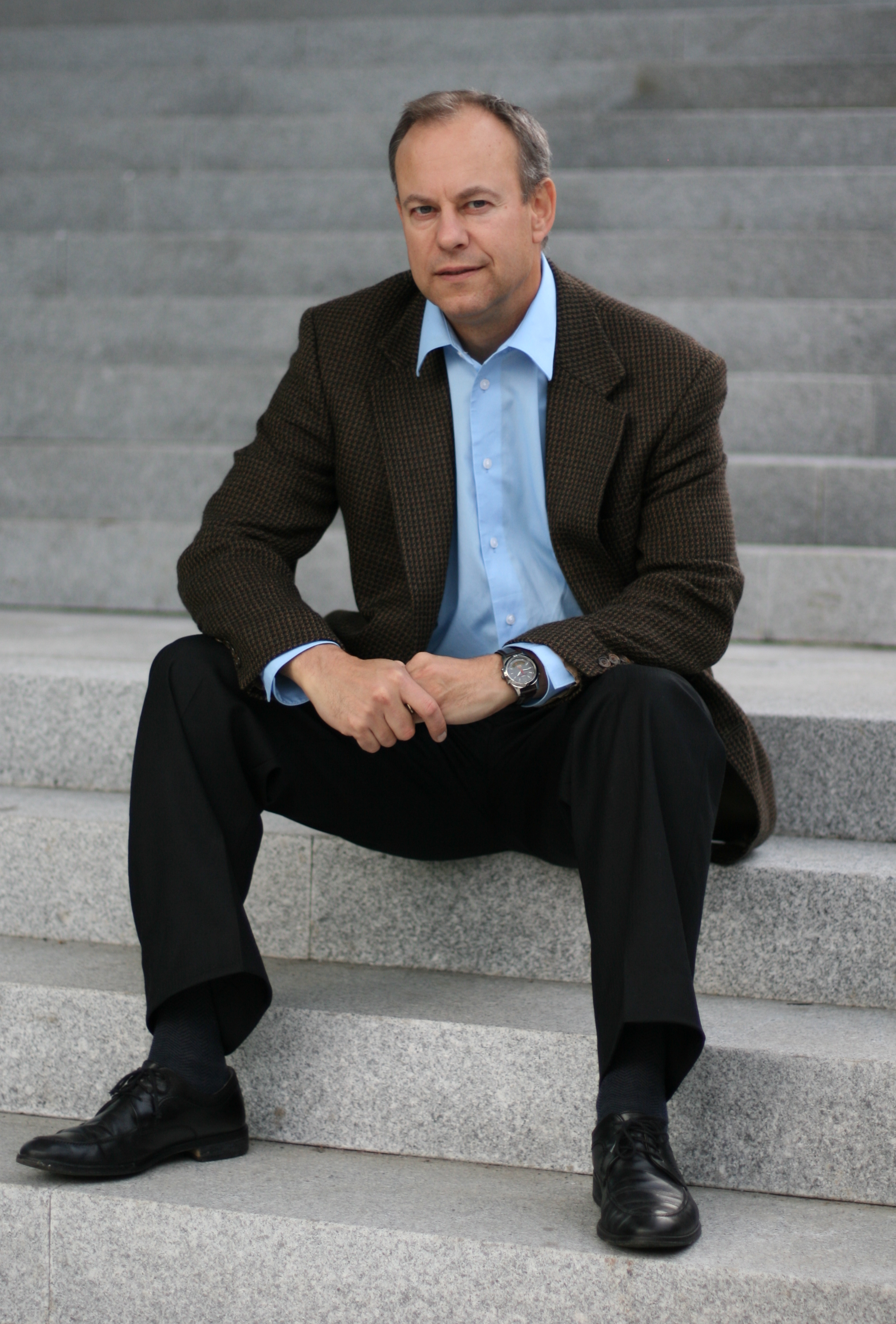
- Scott Gates
- Born: 29 December 1957 (age 68); Minneapolis, Minnesota, U.S.
- Education: University of Michigan; University of Minnesota
- Spouse: Ingeborg Haavardsson
- Scientific career
- Workplaces: Political Scientist, Economist, Professor at University in Oslo, Dept. of Political Science, Research Professor at PRIO and also University in Oslo, Dept. of Economics, ESOP
- Website: www.scottgates.weebly.com

Scott Gates (born 29 December 1957) is an American political scientist and economist based in Norway. He was director of the Peace Research Institute Oslo (PRIO)'s Centre for the Study of Civil War (CSCW), which was a Norwegian Center of Excellence funded by the Research Council of Norway for a twelve-year period 2002-2013. He is currently a research professor at PRIO, a guest researcher at ESOP in the Department of Economics at the University in Oslo and also holds a professorship in the Department of Political science at the University of Oslo. He used to work at the Norwegian University of Science and Technology (NTNU) and Michigan State University (MSU).

His current research topics include rise of China and the Islamic State and police brutality. His previous research includes applied game theoretic analysis, international relations theory, international political economy, formal models of bureaucracy and economic modeling.

Gates holds a BA in political science and anthropology from the University of Minnesota (1980), an MA in political science from the University of Michigan (1983), an MSc in applied economics from the University of Minnesota (1985) and a PhD in political science from the University of Michigan (1989).

He moved to Norway in 2003, was a visiting research fellow at PRIO from 1997 to 1999 and continued as program leader and research professor until 2002, when he was appointed director of the CSCW. He has also held assistant and associate professorships at Michigan State University.

Gates was accepted in the Royal Norwegian Society of Sciences and Letters in 2008. He is also a member of the Norwegian Academy of Science and Letters.

== Selected publications ==
=== Books (monographs) ===
1. Gates, Scott and Kaushik, Roy. 2014. Unconventional Warfare in South Asia. Shadow Warriors and Counterinsurgency. Farnham, UK: Ashgate.
2. Brehm, John and Scott Gates. 2008. Paperback issued in 2010. Teaching, Tasks, and Trust. Functions of the Public Executive. A Volume in the Russell Sage Foundation Series on Trust. New York: Russell Sage Foundation.
3. Fink, Evelyn, Scott Gates, and Brian D. Humes. 1998. Game Theory Topics: Incomplete Information, Repeated Games and N-Player Games. London: Sage Publications.
4. Brehm, John and Scott Gates. 1997. Paperback issued in 1999. Working, Shirking, and Sabotage: Bureaucratic Response to a Democratic Public. Ann Arbor, MI: University of Michigan Press.
5. Gates, Scott and Brian D. Humes. 1997. Games, Information, and Politics: Applying Game Theoretic Models to Political Science. Ann Arbor, MI: University of Michigan Press.

=== Journal articles ===
1. Gates, Scott, Benjamin Graham, Yonatan Lupu, Håvard Strand, and Kaare Strøm. Forthcoming 2016. Powersharing, Protection, and Peace. Journal of Politics.
2. Strøm, Kaare Wallace, Benjamin Graham, Håvard Strand, and Scott Gates. Forthcoming 2015. Inclusion, Dispersion, and Constraint: Powersharing in the World’s States, 1975 – 2010. British Journal of Political Science.
3. Kim, Woosang and Scott Gates. 2015. Power Transition and the Rise of China. International Area Studies Review. 18(3): 219 – 226.
4. Gates, Scott and Sukanya Podder. 2015. Social Media, Recruitment, Allegiance, and the Islamic State. Perspectives on Terrorism. 9(4): 107 – 116.
5. Brehm, John and Scott Gates. 2015. Bureaucratic Politics rising from, Not Defined by, a Principal-Agency Dyad. Journal of Public Administration Research and Theory. 25 (1): 27 – 42.
6. Gates, Scott and Håvard Mokleiv Nygård. 2013. Soft Power at Home and Abroad: Sport Diplomacy, Politics, and Peace-building. International Area Studies Review .16(3): 235 – 243.
7. Binningsbø, Helga Malmin, Cyanne Loyle, Scott Gates, and Jon Elster. 2012. Armed Conflict and Post-Conflict Justice, 1946 – 2006. A Dataset. Journal of Peace Research. 49(5): 731 – 740.
8. Gates, Scott, Håvard Hegre, Håvard Nygård, and Håvard Strand. 2012. The Development Consequences of Civil Conflict. World Development. 40 (9): 1713 – 1722.
9. Butler, Christopher and Scott Gates. 2012. African Range Wars: Climate, Conflict, and Property Rights. Journal of Peace Research. 49(1): 23 – 34.
10. Rustad, Siri Aas, Halvard Buhaug, Åshild Falch, and Scott Gates. 2011. All Politics Is Local. Modeling Subnational Variation in Conflict. Conflict Management and Peace Studies. 28(1): 15 – 40.
11. Butler, Christopher and Scott Gates. 2009. Asymmetry, Parity, and (Civil) War: Can International Theories of Power Help Us Understand Civil War. International Interactions. 35(3): 330 – 40.
12. Buhaug, Halvard, Scott Gates, and Päivi Lujala. 2009. Geography, Rebel Capability and the Duration of Civil Conflict. Journal of Conflict Resolution. 53(4): 544 – 569.
13. Buhaug, Halvard, Scott Gates, Håvard Hegre, Håvard Strand, & Henrik Urdal. 2009. Nils Petter Gleditsch: A Lifetime Achiever. European Political Science. 8(1): 79 – 89.
14. Gates, Scott, Håvard Hegre, Mark Jones, and Håvard Strand. 2006. Institutional Inconsistency and Political Instability: Polity Duration, 1800 – 2000. American Journal of Political Science. 50(4): 33 – 48.
15. Fredriksson, Per G., Eric Neumayer, Scott Gates, and Richard Damania. 2005. Environmentalism, Democracy, and Pollution Control. Journal of Environmental Economics and Management. 49:343 – 365.
16. Murshed, S. Mansoob and Scott Gates. 2005. Spatial-horizontal Inequality and the Maoist Insurgency in Nepal. Review of Development Economics. 9(1): 121 – 134. [Reprinted in Kanbur, Ravi, Anthony J. Venables and Guanghua Wan, eds. Spatial Disparities in Human Development: Perspectives from Asia. Tokyo: UNU Press. 188 – 206. 2006.]
17. Buhaug, Halvard and Scott Gates. 2002. The Geography of Civil War. Journal of Peace Research. 39(4): 417 – 433.[Reprinted in Diehl, Paul F. Diehl, editor. War. Library of International Relations. London: Sage. 3:209 – 229. 2005.]
18. Gates, Scott. 2002. Recruitment and Allegiance: The Microfoundations of Rebellion. Journal of Conflict Resolution. 46(1): 111 – 130.
19. Hegre, Håvard, Tanja Ellingsen, Scott Gates, and Nils Petter Gleditsch. 2001. Toward a Democratic Civil Peace? Democracy, Political Change, and Civil War, 1816 – 1992. American Political Science Review. 95(1): 33 – 48. [Reprinted in Diehl, Paul F. Diehl, editor. War. Library of International Relations. London: Sage. 5: 165 – 193. 2005.]
20. Mitchell, Sara McLaughlin, Scott Gates, and Håvard Hegre. 1999. Evolution in Democracy-War Dynamics. Journal of Conflict Resolution. 43(6): 771 – 792.
21. McLaughlin, Sara, Scott Gates, Håvard Hegre, Ranveig Gissinger, and Nils Petter Gleditsch. 1998. Timing the Changes in Political Structures: A New Polity Database. Journal of Conflict Resolution. 42(2): 231 – 242.
22. Gates, Scott and Mark Lanier. 1996. Incarcerated Youth At Risk: An Empirical Assessment of the AIDS Risk Reduction Model (ARRM) Employing Ordered Probit Analyses. Journal of Criminal Justice. 24(6): 537 – 547. [Reprinted in Lanier, Mark M. Lanier, editor. The Impact of HIV/AIDS on Criminality and Criminal Justice. Hampshire, UK: Ashgate. 2006.]
23. Gates, Scott, Torbjørn Knutsen, and Jonathon Moses. 1996. Democracy and Peace: A More Skeptical View. Journal of Peace Research. 33(1): 1 – 10.
24. Gates, Scott and Jeffrey Hill. 1995. Democratic Accountability and Governmental Innovation in the Use of Non-Profit Organizations. Policy Studies Review. 14(1): 137 – 148.
25. Gates, Scott and Sherry Bennett Quiñones. 1995. Economic Risk and the Politics of Protectionism. International Interactions. 21(1): 63 – 83.
26. Brehm, John and Scott Gates. 1994. When Supervision Fails to Induce Compliance. Journal of Theoretical Politics. 6(3): 323 – 343.
27. Brehm, John and Scott Gates. 1993. Donut Shops and Speed Traps: Evaluating Models of Police Supervision. American Journal of Political Science. 37(2): 555 – 581.

== Research topics ==
1. Research relevant to current affairs: Rise of China, Islamic State and Police Brutality.
2. Research Topics: Applied Game Theoretic Analysis, International Relation Theory, International Political Economy, Formal Models of Bureaucracy, and Economic Modelling.
3. Gates research interests include: Governance, Bureaucracies and Organizations, Conflict Dynamics, and The Development Consequences of Warfare.
