= Helga Hernes =

Norwegian diplomat

- Born: 16 January 1938 (age 88); Germany
- Citizenship: Norwegian
- Education: Mount Holyoke College; Johns Hopkins University
- Known for: State Secretary (1988-1989, 1990-1993); Ambassador (1998-2004)
- Scientific career
- Fields: Political science Women's studies
- Workplaces: University of Bergen; Institute for Social Research

Helga Marie Hernes (born 16 January 1938) is a German-born Norwegian political scientist, diplomat, and politician for the Labour Party.

Educated in the United States, she moved to Norway following her marriage to Norwegian sociologist and politician Gudmund Hernes whom she met during her studies. She was on faculty at the Department of Sociology at the University of Bergen from 1970-80 and subsequently held a number of positions in research management. Her research during the 1970s and 1980s focused on international politics, women's studies and the welfare state, and she is well known for her concept of state feminism, articulated in 1987. Her recent research has focused on gender, armed conflict and security, including the implications of the UN resolution on women, peace and security.

In 1988 she joined Gro Harlem Brundtland's government as State Secretary in the Ministry of Foreign Affairs. After leaving the government in 1993 she was Director of the Centre for International Climate and Environmental Research, and served as Norway's ambassador to Austria, Slovakia, Switzerland and the Holy See. In 2005 she joined the Peace Research Institute Oslo. She held a part-time chair as professor of political science at the University of Oslo from 1993 to 1998.

== Early life and education ==
She was born as Helga Marie Jahncke in Germany (today's Poland), and migrated to Bavaria in 1945 as a refugee. She was an exchange high school student to the United States in 1956, and later took her higher education in that country. A bachelor's degree from the Mount Holyoke College in South Hadley, Massachusetts in 1961 was followed by a master's degree at the Johns Hopkins University in Baltimore, Maryland in 1967.

== Academic, political and diplomatic career ==
In 1970 she completed her PhD in political science at the Johns Hopkins University, on the thesis The Concept of Community in Modern Theories of International Law. She was hired at the Department of Sociology at the University of Bergen in the same year, and became senior lecturer in comparative politics there in 1974. Her research during her Bergen years focused on both international politics, women's issues and welfare state studies. She left Bergen in 1980 to work as research director in the Research Council of Norway, and in 1983 she was hired as a research director at the Norwegian Institute for Social Research. Among her important publications from this time were Staten - kvinner ingen adgang? (1982) and Welfare State and Woman Power. Essays in state feminism (1987), both pertaining to women's studies. These books were a part of the series Kvinners levekår og livsløp, of which Hernes was the editor, counting seventeen publications in total. In the Spring of 1987, Hernes was a Fellow at the Swedish Collegium for Advanced Study in Uppsala, Sweden.

Hernes remained at the Institute for Social Research until 1988, when she was appointed State Secretary in the Ministry of Foreign Affairs as a part of the second cabinet Brundtland. When the second cabinet Brundtland fell in 1989, Hernes returned to her position at the Institute for Social Research. However, in 1990 a third cabinet Brundtland assumed office, and Hernes again became State Secretary.

Hernes left the cabinet in 1993. She was appointed director of the Centre for International Climate and Environmental Research (CICERO), and was also a professor of political science at the University of Oslo. In 1996 she left CICERO to work as an advisor in the Ministry of Foreign Affairs. In 1998 Hernes left both positions to become Norway's ambassador to Austria and Slovakia. She was then Norway's ambassador to Switzerland and the Holy See from 2002 to 2004. In 2004 she returned to her research career to work for Norwegian Social Research. After one year she was hired as an advisor at the Peace Research Institute Oslo (PRIO), where she works today on issues related to gender and conflict. From 1 July 2006 she combined this job with the position as chair of the Norwegian Parliamentary Intelligence Oversight Committee), a board for supervision of the Norwegian Police Security Service, the Norwegian Defence Security Staff and the Norwegian Intelligence Service. She left the Parliamentary Intelligence Oversight Committee in 2011.

Recent publications include "De nye krigene i et kjønnsperspektiv" [The new wars in a gender perspective], part of the volume Kjønn, krig, konflikt [Gender, war and conflict], edited by Hege Skjeie, Inger Skjelsbæk and Torunn L. Tryggestad (Oslo: Pax, 2008). She also edited the volume Women and War: Power and Protection in the 21st Century with Chantal de Jonge Oudraat and Kathleen Kuehnast (Washington, DC: United States Institute of Peace Press, 2011).

== Honours ==
She holds honorary doctorates from the University of Tromsø (since 1993) and the Stockholm University (since 2002). In 1999 she was decorated as a Knight of the Royal Norwegian Order of Merit, and she was promoted to Commander of the order in 2002.

In 2018 she became an honorary member of the Norwegian Association for Women's Rights; the last person to be so honoured was Gro Harlem Brundtland.

== Personal life ==
Helga Hernes has been married to Gudmund Hernes, a sociologist and former politician. Their son Stein Hernes has been an advisor for Norwegian Prime Minister Jens Stoltenberg.

== See also ==
- State feminism
