= Mohammad Faghfoory =

Iranian-American Islamic scholar

Mohammad Hassan Faghfoory
- Born: Mohammad Hassan Faghfoory

Academic background
- Education: University of Illinois, University of Wisconsin-Madison

Academic work
- Institutions: George Washington University
- Notable works: The First Dutch-Persian Commercial Conflict: The Attack on Qeshm Island 1640 with; Kernel of the Kernel: Concerning the Wayfaring and Spiritual Journey of the People of Intellect

Mohammad Hassan Faghfoory is an Iranian-American Islamic scholar and professor of Islamic studies at the George Washington University in Washington, D.C.

== Biography ==
Faghfoory obtained advanced degrees in history and Middle East studies from the University of Illinois Urbana-Champaign, as well as a Master's and a PhD in political science and Middle East studies from the University of Wisconsin–Madison. He previously taught at the University of Tehran and served as a visiting scholar at University of California, Los Angeles. He was an adjunct professor of Middle East History at University of Mary Washington and served as an Islamic Manuscripts Specialist at Princeton University, and at the Library of Congress. He serves as a professor of Islamic Studies at George Washington University and the director of the M.A. in Islamic Studies program.

== Works ==
Faghfoory is the author of twelve books, as well as several book chapters and scholarly articles. These include:

As Author

- The role of the Ulama in twentieth century Iran : with particular reference to Ayatullah Haj Sayyid Abul-Qasim Kahsani (1978)
- Tuhfah-yi 'Abbasi: The Golden Chain of Sufism in Shi'ite Islam (2007)
- Dastur al-Moluk: A Safavid State Manual (2007)
- "Shi'ite Islam" (book chapter) in Religion, War, and Ethics: A Sourcebook of Textual Traditions (Cambridge University Press, 2014) (Sponsored by the Peace Research Institute Oslo)
- Sufism and Social Integration: Connecting Hearts, Crossing Boundaries (2015)
- The First Dutch-Persian Commercial Conflict: The Attack on Qeshm Island 1640 with Willem Floor

As Translator

- Kernel of the Kernel: Concerning the Wayfaring and Spiritual Journey of the People of Intellect (2003)
- The Path of Worshippers to the Paradise of the Lord of the Worlds: Minhaj Al-Abidin Ila Jannat Rabb Al-Alamin (2012)
- Life After Death, Resurrection, Judgment and the Final Destiny of the Soul: Volume 1 by Allamah Sayyid Muhammad Tihrani (2015)

As Editor

- Beacon of Knowledge: Essays in Honor of Seyyed Hossein Nasr (2003)
- Voices of Three Generations: Essays in Honor of Seyyed Hossein Nasr (2019)
