= Johan Galtung =

Norwegian sociologist and peace scholar (1930–2024)

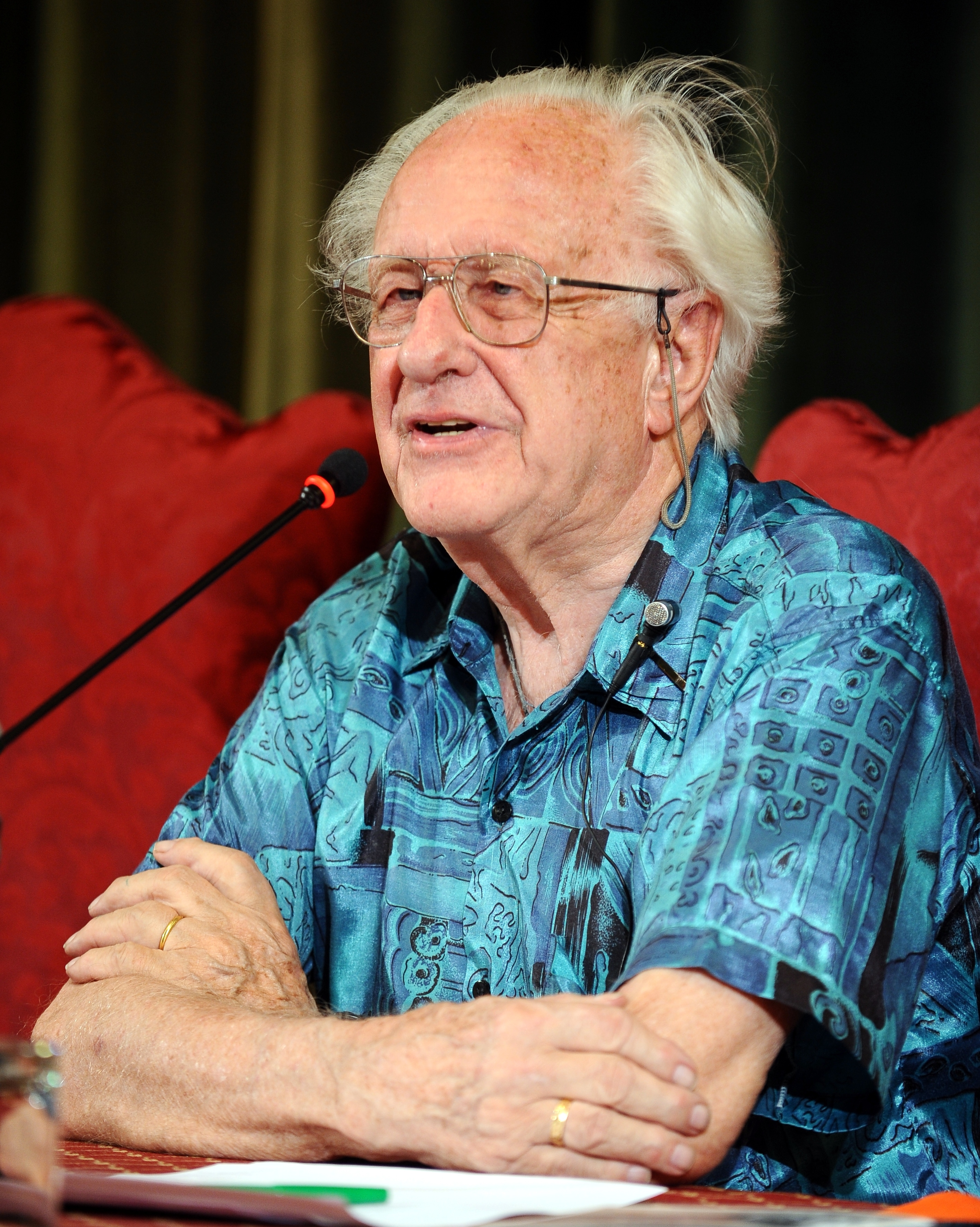
- Galtung in 2012
- Born: Johan Vincent Galtung; 24 October 1930; Oslo, Norway
- Died: 17 February 2024 (aged 93); Stabekk Helsehus og Hospice, Baerum, Norway
- Education: University of Oslo
- Known for: Principal founder of peace and conflict studies
- Spouses: Ingrid Eide (m. 1956; div. 1968) Fumiko Nishimura (m. 1969)
- Children: 4
- Awards: Right Livelihood Award (1987)
- Scientific career
- Fields: Sociology, peace and conflict studies
- Workplaces: Columbia University; University of Oslo; Peace Research Institute Oslo (PRIO)

Founder and Director of Peace Research Institute Oslo
- In office 1959–1969
- Succeeded by: Asbjørn Eide

Galtung in discussion with Amy Goodman, 2012

Johan Vincent Galtung (24 October 1930 – 17 February 2024) was a Norwegian sociologist and the principal founder of the discipline of peace and conflict studies. He was the main founder of the Peace Research Institute Oslo (PRIO) in 1959 and was its first director until 1970. He also established the Journal of Peace Research in 1964.

In 1969, he was appointed to the world's first chair in peace and conflict studies, at the University of Oslo. He resigned his Oslo professorship in 1977 and thereafter held professorships at several other universities; from 1993 to 2000 he taught as Distinguished Professor of Peace Studies at the University of Hawaiʻi. He was the Tun Mahathir Professor of Global Peace at the International Islamic University Malaysia until 2015.

== Background ==
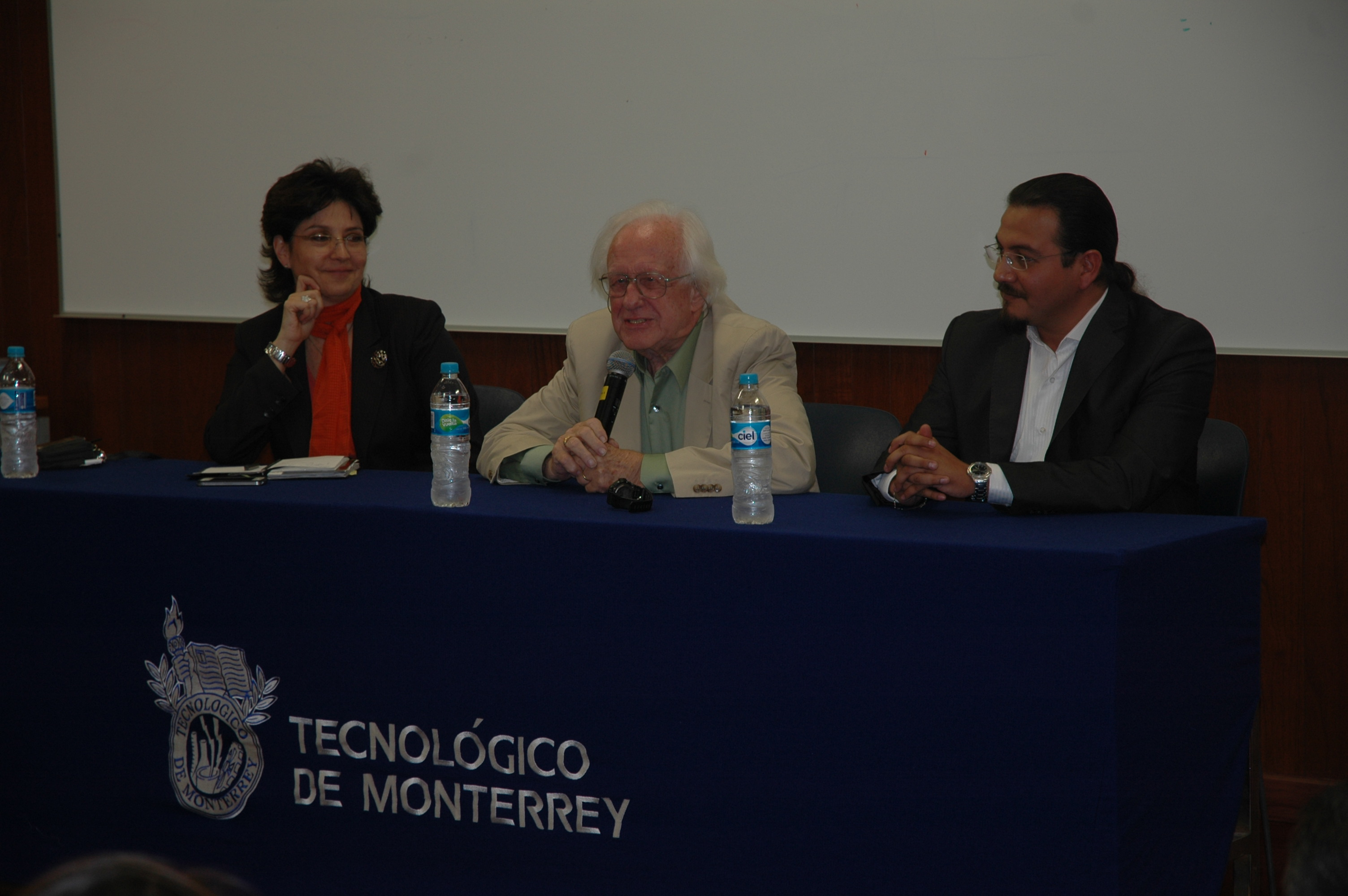
Galtung speaking at the Monterrey Institute of Technology and Higher Education, Mexico City in September 2012.

Galtung was born in Oslo. He earned the cand. real. degree in mathematics at the University of Oslo in 1956, and a year later completed the mag. art. (PhD) degree in sociology at the same university. Galtung received the first of thirteen honorary doctorates in 1975.

Galtung's father and paternal grandfather were both physicians. The Galtung name has its origins in Hordaland, where his paternal grandfather was born. Nevertheless, his mother, Helga Holmboe, was born in central Norway, in Trøndelag, while his father was born in Østfold, in the south. Galtung was married twice, and had two children by his first wife Ingrid Eide, Harald Galtung and Andreas Galtung, and two by his second wife Fumiko Nishimura, Irene Galtung and Fredrik Galtung.

Galtung experienced World War II in German-occupied Norway, and as a 12-year-old saw his father arrested by the Nazis. By 1951, he was already a committed peace mediator, and elected to do 18 months of social service in place of his obligatory military service. After 12 months, Galtung insisted that the remainder of his social service be spent in activities relevant to peace.When the Norwegian government refused, he willingly accepted to spend six months in prison.

Galtung died in Stabekk Helsehus og Hospice, Baerum, Norway, on 17 February 2024, at the age of 93.

== Career ==
Upon receiving his mag. art. degree, Galtung moved to Columbia University, in New York City, where he taught for five semesters as an assistant professor in the department of sociology. In 1959, Galtung returned to Oslo, where he founded the Peace Research Institute Oslo (PRIO). He was the institute's director until 1969.

In 1964, Galtung led PRIO to establish the first academic journal devoted to Peace Studies: the Journal of Peace Research. In the same year, he assisted in the founding of the International Peace Research Association. In 1969, he left PRIO for a position as professor of peace and conflict research at the University of Oslo, a position he held until 1978.

Galtung was the director general of the International University Centre in Dubrovnik and helped to found and lead the World Future Studies Federation. He has held visiting positions at other universities, including Santiago, Chile, the United Nations University in Geneva, Witten/Herdecke University in Germany, and at Columbia University, Princeton University and the University of Hawaiʻi in the United States. In 2014, he was appointed the first Tun Mahathir Professor of Global Peace at the International Islamic University Malaysia.

Economist and fellow peace researcher Kenneth Boulding has said of Galtung that his "output is so large and so varied that it is hard to believe that it comes from a human". He was a member of the Norwegian Academy of Science and Letters.

In 1993, he co-founded TRANSCEND: A Peace Development Environment Network. In 1987, he was given the Right Livelihood Award. In the Spring of 1999, Galtung was a Fellow at the Swedish Collegium for Advanced Study in Uppsala, Sweden.

== Work and views ==
=== Violence Triangle ===
In Galtung's 1969 paper, "Violence, Peace and Peace Research", he presents his theory of the Conflict Triangle, a framework used in the study of peace and conflict, with the purpose of defining the three key elements of violence that form this "triangle." The theory is based on the principle that peace must be defined by widely accepted social goals, and that any state of peace is characterized by the absence of violence. When a conflict has features of all three areas of violence, the result is a more consolidated, static state of violence in a social system, which may include a conflict or a nation-state, whereas the absence of these three typologies of violence results in peace.

==== Structural Violence ====
Galtung's concept of structural violence refers to the indirect forms of violence originating from social, economic, and political structures and manifesting primarily as oppression and exploitation. These indirect forms of violence result in injustices in the distribution of political power and economic benefits.

Rather than conveying a physical image, structural violence is an avoidable impairment of fundamental human needs. Structural violence is increased in situations where low income individuals also suffer in the rank dimensions of education, health, and power. This is due to an overall consolidation of factors in the social structure, resulting in a high correlation between social class and disempowerment. Structural violence can be recognized through its relative stability, having been built into the social structure. This can make structural violence difficult to ascertain, despite its often vast consequences. This concept has been applied in a large number of cases, some of the most notable are listed below.

Akhil Gupta argued in 2012 that structural violence has been the key influence in the nature and distribution of extreme suffering in India, driven by the Indian state in its alleged corruption, overly bureaucratic standards of governance used to exclude the middle and working classes from the political system through a system of politicized poverty.

Jacklyn Cock's 1989 paper in the Review of African Political Economy applied Galtung's theory of structural violence, analysing the role of militarized society under the apartheid regime of South Africa in the development of patriarchal values that is a form of structural violence against women. Cock found that tacit misdirection of women in society by its leadership focused their energies toward the direct and indirect incorporation of the patriarchal regime in order to maintain the status quo.

Mats Utas claimed that even those youth in Liberia indirectly unaffected by direct violence in the civil war of 1989-1996 suffered from structural violence in the form of association with different blocs, leading to poverty, joblessness and marginalisation effects.

==== Cultural Violence ====
Galtung defines cultural violence as ideas, consciousness, language, art, or science that can be used to legitimize or enable direct violence or structural violence. The existence of prevailing or prominent social norms make direct and structural violence seem natural or at least acceptable, and serves to explain how prominent beliefs can become so embedded in a given culture that they function as absolute and inevitable and are reproduced uncritically across generations. Galtung expanded on the concept of cultural violence in a 1990 paper also published in the Journal of Peace Research. This concept has been applied in a limited number of cases, with most occurring after Galtung's follow up paper in 1990, some of the most notable of which are listed below.

Johan Galtung has written about Zionism and violence. He has discussed various forms of violence, including structural and cultural violence, in his extensive body of work. Galtung has been critical of Zionism, particularly in the context of the Israeli-Palestinian conflict, and has linked it to broader themes of structural violence. He has framed Zionism within his broader theories of structural and cultural violence, suggesting that the establishment and actions of the state of Israel have contributed to ongoing conflict and suffering in the region.

Gregory Phillips argues in his 2003 book, Addictions and Healing in Aboriginal Country, that resistance to the Western medical sphere driven by previous atrocities committed against the Aboriginal community has led to a fierce resistance effort against modern medicine, addiction treatment and perhaps fuels a desire to seek out drugs and illicit substances as a starting point of addiction. Wide scale suspicion against medical practitioners and government representatives has become engendered in the Aboriginal community.

In Enduring Violence: Ladina Women's Lives in Guatemala, the 2011 book by Cecilia Menjívar, it is argued that the preexisting cultural conditions of mediania, or half and half, agriculture led to women facing large scale cultural violence due to high rents, low returns and high required investment with additionally harsh conditions due to the conflict in Guatemala. Given the patriarchal culture of Guatemala, any earnings would go to the partner of the working woman, leaving a large poverty gap enshrined in the demographic diversity of the country.

The Austrian peace researcher Franz Jedlicka has tried to measure the level of cultural violence in a "Culture of Violence Scale" in 2023.

==== Direct Violence ====
Direct Violence is characterised as having an actor that commits the violence, and is thus able to be traced back to persons as actors. Direct violence shows less stability, given it is subject to the preference sets of individuals, and thus is more easily recognised. Direct violence is the most visible, occurring physically or verbally, and the victim and the offender can be clearly identified. Direct violence is highly interdependent with structural and cultural violence: cultural and structural violence causes direct violence which on the other hand reinforces the former ones. This concept has been applied in a large number of cases, some of which are listed below.

A 2011 paper by the International Center for Research on Women (ICRW) demonstrated the widespread nature of child marriage in South Asia. The ICRW highlighted marriage before the age of 18 as a fundamental human rights violation, one that leads to early childbearing, with significantly higher maternal mortality and morbidity rates as well as higher infant mortality rates amongst women. The paper most directly presented evidence to show that child brides are at heightened risk of violence in the home.

In Matthew Chandler's 2009 paper on so-called "non-violent" techniques utilised by Hezbollah still include forms of Direct Violence, most notably the threat of violence toward Fouad Siniora's allies after his 2008 order to dismantle the Hezbollah telecommunications network in 2008, which led to the freezing of the order. Further, Hezbollah are argued to have used their operation of social services, in lieu of government operations, as a ransom for support as well as rewarding their fighters with guaranteed healthcare and support for their families. Chandler argues this is due to opposition within the group to harming Lebanese civilians, who they view as "their own", or exacerbating conflict through civil war.

In 2005, Steven Wright made the case for Peacekeeping efforts to be regarded as violence due to increasing use of techniques such as pre-interrogation treatment, and the use of non-lethal weapons such as tear gas for crowd dispersal and plastic bullets, which he terms "torture-lite", being increasingly common in peacekeeping manuals across a number of nation-states and supranational organisations.

=== Applications of the triangle ===
Galtung's violence triangle has often been used to analyse interstate, territorial and ethnic conflicts. For example, Taleh Ziyadov applied the model to the Nagorno-Karabakh conflict, examining how direct violence was connected to structural disputes over territory and political status and to cultural narratives that legitimised hostility between Armenians and Azerbaijanis. After Galtung's death in 2024, the University of Pisa journal Scienza e Pace dedicated a special issue to his life, work and intellectual legacy. In a contribution to this issue, Tiziano Peccia used the triangle in a less conventional context by applying it to a conflict within the Ascione Camorra clan, a local non-state criminal organisation. Peccia interpreted physical assaults and threats as direct violence, the clan's patriarchal hierarchy and unequal treatment of women as structural violence, and beliefs concerning honour, fidelity, motherhood and female obedience as cultural violence that helped legitimise this inequality. The study therefore extended the model beyond wars and conflicts between states or ethnic groups, arguing that it could also be used to investigate gendered power relations, internal struggles and forms of violence within organised crime and other non-state organisations.

==== Reinforcing Factors ====
Galtung focuses a section of the paper on the means of direct and structural violence, in particular, developing groups of factors that may be included as types of such forms and methods of maintaining and reinforcing the mechanisms of such violence. In terms of reinforcing factors, Galtung identifies six key areas:

Linear Ranking Order
Systems in which there is an open and complete ranking of actors leaves no doubt as to the actor who is ranked more highly, and is thus a mechanism of structural violence due to the reinforcement of an existing power dynamic.
Acyclical Interaction Pattern
Systems in which all actors are connected via a one-way ‘correct’ path of interaction, where outcomes are structurally dependent on using this system in the intended way of its design. This makes structural systems stable, as change can only be achieved through this consolidated power-seeking and power-retaining system.
Rank-Centrality Correlation
Within the social system, actors that are higher ranked are more central within the system itself, reinforcing their importance to the status quo as well as their incentives to maintain it.
System Congruence
Social systems are made up of similar components, allowing those who are ranked highly and are successful at mobilising one system shifting from a comparative advantage within one system to an absolute advantage over all systems of desired operation.
Rank Concordance
Actors that are ranked highly within one metric, such as income, are also ranked highly on other metrics such as education and health. This congruence is also present in actors ranked low within these metrics, and serves to limit mobility within the social system.
Interlevel High Rank Coupling
Collaboration amongst the highest ranks results in the system being defined in such a way that benefits the most powerful actors, usually through a sub optimally ranked representative (not the highest ranked actor), which limits allegations of system consolidation by the most powerful.

Beyond Galtung's initial paper and thesis, scholars have applied the Conflict Triangle to a broad array of conflicts, struggles and occupations since 1969, and retroactively.

==== Criticism of the model ====
Galtung's Conflict Triangle and Peace Research paper are widely cited as the foundational pieces of theory within peace and conflict studies. However, they are not without criticism. Galtung uses very broad definitions of violence, conflict and peace, and applies the terms of mean both direct and indirect, negative and positive, and violence in which one cannot distinguish actors or victims, which serves to limit the direct application of the model itself.

Galtung uses a positivist approach, in that he assumes that every rational tenet of the theory can be verified, serving to reject social processes beyond relationships and actions. This approach enforces a paradigm of clear-cut, currently testable propositions as the ‘whole’ of the system, and thus is often deemed reductionist. Galtung also wields an explicit normative orientation in the paper, in which there is a weighting toward evaluative statements that may show bias or simply opinion, or indeed a trend toward the institutions and concepts of peace in the West, which may serve to limit the applicability of the model more widely.

=== Peacebuilding ===
Galtung proposes resolving conflicts through peacekeeping, peacemaking, and peacebuilding. Peacekeeping and peacemaking primarily involve eliminating violence and bringing about immediate peace. In Galtung's view, addressing the root causes of violence requires peacebuilding which goes beyond ending direct violence to end structural violence and cultural violence.

The peacebuilding structures needed to address the root causes of conflict and support local capacity for peace management and conflict resolution. Galtung has held several significant positions in international research councils and has been an advisor to several international organisations. Since 2004, he has been a member of the Advisory Council of the Committee for a Democratic UN.

Galtung is strongly associated with the following concepts:

- Structural violence – widely defined as the systematic ways in which a regime prevents individuals from achieving their full potential. Institutionalized racism and sexism are examples of this.
- Negative vs. positive peace – popularized the concept that peace may be more than just the absence of overt violent conflict (negative peace), and will likely include a range of relationships up to a state where nations (or any groupings in conflict) might have collaborative and supportive relationships (positive peace). Though he did not cite them, these terms were, in fact, previously defined and discussed in a series of lectures starting in 1899 by Jane Addams (in her 1907 book she switched to calling it 'newer ideals of peace' but continued to contrast them to the term negative peace), and in 1963 in the letter from a Birmingham jail by Martin Luther King Jr.

=== Criticism of the United States ===
In 1973, Galtung criticised the "structural fascism" of the US and other Western countries that make war to secure materials and markets, stating: "Such an economic system is called capitalism, and when it's spread in this way to other countries it's called imperialism", and praised Fidel Castro's Cuba in 1972 for "break[ing] free of imperialism's iron grip". Galtung stated that the US is a "killer country" guilty of "neo-fascist state terrorism" and compared the US to Nazi Germany for bombing Kosovo during the 1999 NATO bombing of Yugoslavia.

In an article published in 2004, Galtung predicted that the US empire will "decline and fall" by 2020. He expanded on this hypothesis in his 2009 book titled The Fall of the US Empire - and Then What? Successors, Regionalization or Globalization? US Fascism or US Blossoming?.

Following the election of Donald Trump in 2016, Galtung revised forward his theory of American global power decline, citing Trump's deportation policy and critical views of NATO would accelerate it.

=== Views on Communist regimes ===
During his career, Galtung statements and views have drawn criticism including his criticism of Western countries during and after the Cold War and what his critics perceived as a positive attitude to the Soviet Union, Cuba and Communist China. A 2007 article by Bruce Bawer published by the City Journal magazine and a subsequent article in February 2009 by Barbara Kay in the National Post criticised Galtung's opinion of China during the rule of Mao Zedong. China, according to Galtung, was "repressive in a certain liberal sense", but he insisted "the whole theory about what an 'open society' is must be rewritten, probably also the theory of 'democracy'—and it will take a long time before the West will be willing to view China as a master teacher in such subjects." Calling Galtung a "lifelong enemy of freedom", Bawer said Galtung discouraged Hungarian resistance against the Soviet invasion in 1956, and criticized his description in 1974 of Aleksandr Solzhenitsyn and Andrei Sakharov as "persecuted elite personages".

=== Views on Yugoslavia ===
Galtung views on Yugoslavia of the period 1991-2014 are contained on the blog Yugoslavia – What Should Have Been Done? A co-operation with Jan Oberg (1951-) and Håkan Wiberg.

=== Views on Jews and Israel ===
Galtung recommended that people should read The Protocols of the Elders of Zion, a fabricated antisemitic text purporting to describe a Jewish plan for global domination. In defending his claims that Jews control American media companies, Galtung cited an article published by National Vanguard, a neo-Nazi website. Galtung's rhetoric has been criticized by Terje Emberland, a historian at the Center for Studies of the Holocaust and Religious Minorities in Oslo, and Øystein Sørensen, a University of Oslo historian known for his scholarship on conspiracy theories. Asked by NRK about his controversial remarks, Galtung reiterated his recommendation that people should read The Protocols of the Elders of Zion. Galtung rejected that he was anti-Semitic.

The Israeli newspaper Haaretz accused Galtung in May 2012 of antisemitism for (1) suggesting the possibility of a link between the 2011 Norway attacks and Israel's intelligence agency Mossad; (2) maintaining that "six Jewish companies" control 96% of world media; (3) identifying what he contends are ironic similarities between the banking firm Goldman Sachs and the conspiratorial antisemitic forgery The Protocols of the Elders of Zion; and (4) theorizing, although not justified, antisemitism in post–World War I Germany was a predictable consequence of German Jews holding influential positions. As a result of such statements, TRANSCEND International, an organisation co-founded by Galtung, released a statement in May 2012 attempting to clarify his opinions. On 8 August 2012, the World Peace Academy in Basel, Switzerland announced it was suspending Galtung from its organization, citing what it posited were his "reckless and offensive statements to questions that are specifically sensitive for Jews." Galtung said the claims were "smearing and libel".

== Selected awards and recognitions ==
- Dr honoris causa, University of Tampere, 1975, peace studies
- Dr honoris causa, University of Cluj, 1976, future studies
- Dr honoris causa, Uppsala University, 1987, Faculty of Social Sciences
- Dr honoris causa, Soka University, Tokyo, 1990, peace/Buddhism
- Dr honoris causa, University of Osnabrück, 1995, peace studies
- Dr honoris causa, University of Torino, 1998, sociology of law
- Dr honoris causa, FernUniversität Hagen, 2000, philosophy
- Dr honoris causa, University of Alicante, 2002, sociology
- Dr honoris causa, Benemérita Universidad Autónoma de Puebla, 2006, law
- Dr honoris causa, Complutense University, Madrid, 2017, politics and sociology
- Honorary professor, University of Alicante, Alicante, 1981
- Honorary professor, Free University of Berlin, 1984–1993
- Honorary professor, Sichuan University, Chengdu, 1986
- Honorary professor, Witten/Herdecke University, Witten, 1993
- Distinguished professor of peace studies, University of Hawaiʻi, 1993-
- John Perkins University Distinguished Visiting Professor, 2005-
- Right Livelihood Award, 1987
- First recipient of the Humanist Prize of the Norwegian Humanist Association, 1988
- Jamnalal Bajaj International Award for Promoting Gandhian Values, 1993
- Brage Prize, 2000
- First Morton Deutsch Conflict Resolution Award, 2001
- Honorary Prize of the Norwegian Sociological Association, 2001
- Premio Hidalgo, Madrid, 2005
- Augsburg Golden Book of Peace, 2006
- Member of the Norwegian Academy of Science and Letters
- Honorary member of the Green Party, 2009
- Erik Bye Memorial Prize, 2011

== Selected works ==
Galtung has published more than a thousand articles and over a hundred books.

- Statistisk hypotesepröving (Statistical hypothesis testing, 1953)
- Gandhis politiske etikk (Gandhi's political ethics, 1955, with philosopher Arne Næss)
- Theory and Methods of Social Research (1967)
- Violence, Peace and Peace Research (1969)
- Members of Two Worlds (1971)
- Fred, vold og imperialisme (Peace, violence and imperialism, 1974)
- Peace: Research – Education – Action (1975)
- Learning from China? (1977, with Fumiko Nishimura)
- Europe in the Making (1989)
- Global Glasnost: Toward a New World Information and Communication Order? (1992, with Richard C. Vincent)
- Global Projections of Deep-Rooted U.S Pathologies (1996)
- Peace By Peaceful Means: Peace and Conflict, Development and Civilization (1996)
- Johan uten land. På fredsveien gjennom verden (Johan without land. On the Peace Path Through the World, 2000, autobiography for which he won the Brage Prize)
- 50 Years: 100 Peace and Conflict Perspectives (2008)
- Democracy – Peace – Development (2008, with Paul D. Scott)
- 50 Years: 25 Intellectual Landscapes Explored (2008)
- Globalizing God: Religion, Spirituality and Peace (2008, with Graeme MacQueen)

== See also ==
- Cost of conflict, a tool which attempts to calculate the price of conflict to the human race
- Democratic peace theory, a theory which posits that democracies are hesitant to engage in armed conflict with other identified democracies
- Critical race theory, a critical examination of society and culture, to the intersection of race, law, and power

== Sources ==
- Boulding, Elise. 1982. "Review: Social Science—For What?: Festschrift for Johan Galtung." Contemporary Sociology. 11(3): pages 323-324. JSTOR Stable URL
- Boulding, Kenneth E. 1977. "Twelve Friendly Quarrels with Johan Galtung." Journal of Peace Research. 14(1): pages 75-86. JSTOR Stable URL
