= Inger Skjelsbæk =

Gender studies scholar

- Born: 26 September 1969 (age 56)
- Occupation: Peace researcher

Inger Skjelsbæk (born 26 September 1969 in Oslo, Norway) is a Norwegian gender studies scholar, who is professor of gender studies at the Centre for Gender Research in Oslo. She was an associate professor at the Department of Psychology at the University of Oslo between 2015 and 2019. Skjelsbæk is also a research professor at the Peace Research Institute Oslo and served as the institute's deputy director from 2009 to 2015.

== Academic background ==
Skjelsbæk studied English, French, psychology and statistics, and earned a cand.mag. degree at the University of Oslo in 1993 and a cand.polit. degree in social psychology at the then-University of Trondheim in 1996; Her thesis was titled Women and War: A Qualitative Study of the Construction of Femininity in the Wars in the Former Yugoslavia, El Salvador and Vietnam. In 2007 she earned her dr.polit. (corresponding to Ph.D.) at the same university, then renamed the Norwegian University of Science and Technology. Her dissertation was titled Sexual Violence In Time of War: Sexuality, Ethnicity and Gender Diversity in the War in Bosnia-Herzegovina. She is a visiting senior fellow at the Centre for Women, Peace and Security at the London School of Economics.

== Research ==
Skjelsbæk has been a researcher at the Peace Research Institute Oslo since 1996. Her fieldwork has mainly been in Bosnia-Herzegovina. Skjelsbæk has published articles in several academic journals, and is a member of the editorial board of International Feminist Journal of Politics. She has edited two books and contributed book chapters to several edited volumes. In addition, Skjelsbæk is the author of numerous research and policy oriented reports and has been an active lecturer and commentator. In 2011 and 2012 she is a guest researcher at the Human Rights Center at the University of California, Berkeley.

== Other activities ==
In 2017 she became a second deputy member of the Norwegian Nobel Committee, but has never met in the committee.

== Selected bibliography ==
- The Political Psychology of War Rape: Studies from Bosnia-Herzegovina. London: Routledge (2011)
- Kjønn, Krig, Konflikt Skjeie, Hege; Inger Skjelsbæk & Torunn Tryggestad, (Red.) Oslo: Pax Forlag (2008)
- Gender, Peace and Conflict. Skjelsbæk, Inger & Dan Smith (2001) London: SAGE Publications.
