= State feminism =

Feminism created, approved, or promoted by a government

State feminism is feminism created or approved by the government of a state or nation. It usually specifies a particular program. The term was coined by Helga Hernes with particular reference to the situation in Norway, which had a tradition of government-supported liberal feminism dating back to the 1880s, and is often used when discussing the government-supported gender equality policies of the Nordic countries, that are linked to the Nordic model. The term has also been used in the context of developing countries where the government may prescribe its form of feminism and at the same time prohibit non-governmental organizations from advocating for any other feminist program. In this sense it is possible to distinguish between a liberal state feminism found in Western democracies such as the Nordic countries, and a somewhat more authoritarian state feminism that is often also linked to secularism, found e.g. in certain Middle Eastern countries.

== About ==
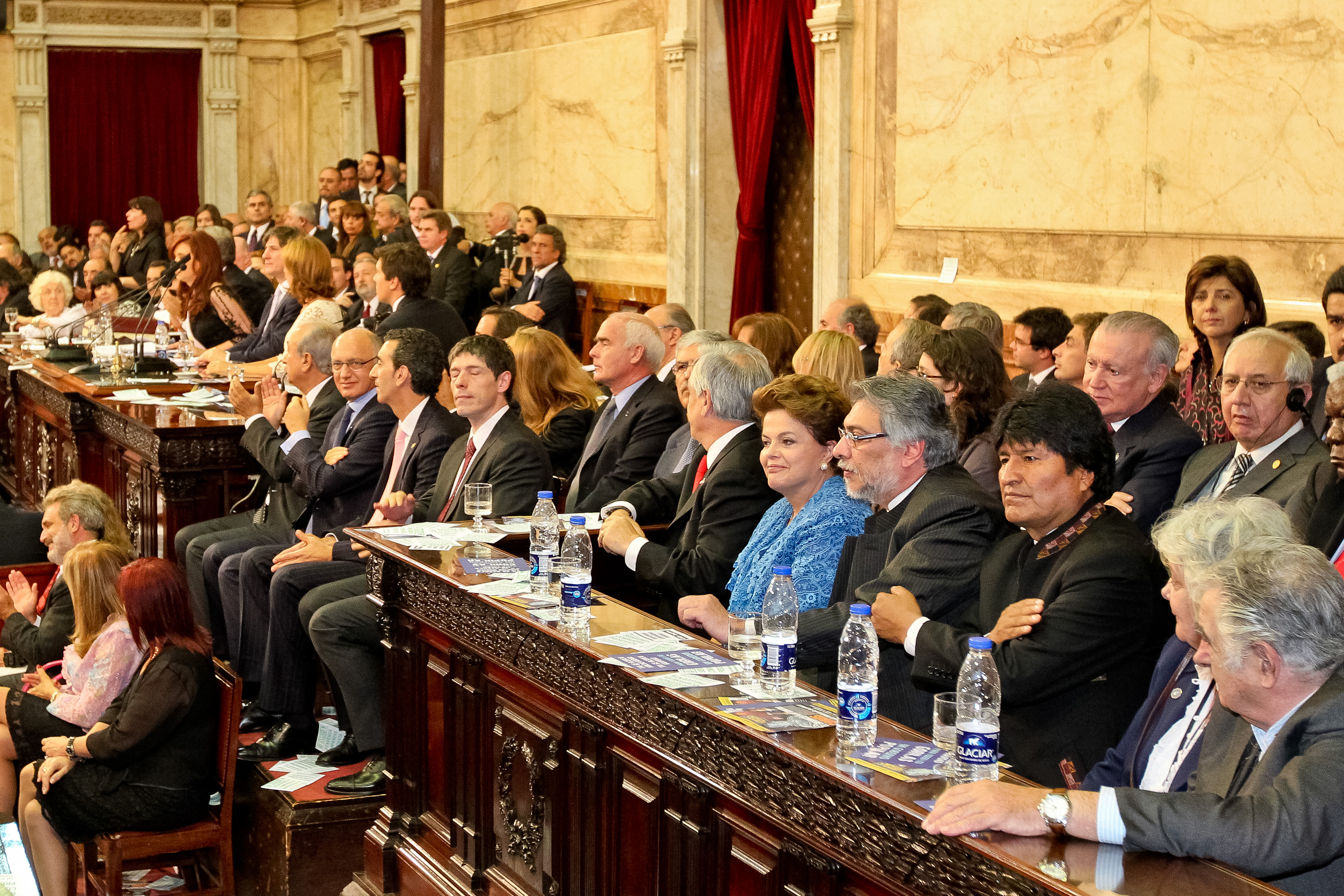
A picture of Argentine Chambers of Deputies, a subject of Gender Quotas

State feminism is when the government or the state adopts policies that are beneficial to women's rights and the improvement of women's lives. Scholars of state feminism look at the effectiveness of various government programs, and how they improve women's rights and their status in their localities. Some researchers, such as Elisabeth Friedman, have suggested that it is essential that there is a strong women's movement that works independent of the state in order for state feminism to be successful. In Australia and the Netherlands those involved with the promotion of state feminism can be called "femocrats." It can also be useful to apply the concept of state feminism to examine the policies towards women in countries that have a strong central state, such as Japan.

=== Origin ===
The term "state feminism" was coined by Norwegian political scientist Helga Hernes in 1987. Feminist theorists in the 1980s had begun to reconsider the role that governments could have on positive outcomes for women's lives. A state, as a system, could support the interests of different classes, genders and "racial hierarchies." It could also support a diverse number of programs that have different levels of support within government or society. The theory of state feminism originates from Scandinavian countries and their gender egalitarian policies. During the 1970s and 1980s, Scandinavian feminist organizations successfully appealed to their governments for gender equality. At the same time, many actors pushed for women to enter the work force, leading to a movement of women into the public sphere. Hernes labeled these steps as an approach towards a "women-friendly" state and a "state feminist". Hernes noted that liberal welfare policies combined with high levels of women representation within legislative bodies were defining characteristics of each of these states.

In 1995, with the help of others, McBride and Mazur founded the Research Network on Gender Politics and the State(RNGS). The RNGS looked to clarify the idea of state feminism, initially defined as "when women’s policy agencies acting as allies of women’s movement actors achieve policy goals and procedural access to policy-making arenas". With the RNGS having gender policy experts study policy debates on "hot issues" between the years of 1960 and 2000s, a structured state feminist theoretical framework came into view.

=== Theory ===
State feminism revolves around the government enforcing gender egalitarian values and the policy agendas which the state uses. This allows a decrease in the distrust which some feminist feel towards the government within a patriarchal society. McBride and Mazur identify two types of state feminism derived from agency-movement alliances: "Movement State Feminism" and "Transformative State Feminism." The former describes when the government reacts to the women's movement in a place by creating policies that promote "demands based on gender consciousness, women's solidarity, and the cause of women."State feminism's framework requires that these movements have two key component, "the discourse developed by women as they contemplate their own gender consciousness in relation to society; and the actors who present that discourse in public life". The transformative process is where the demands already started within the state become "explicitly feminist" and work towards full gender equality and the possibility of transforming relationships between genders. State feminism can also drive a government to become more broadly democratic in nature. State feminism should be conceptualized as a gradient. Each policy agency participates separately in the process of pushing policy, creating unique "substantive and procedural responses".

Hedlund and Lindberg further organize state feminism into the "macro level, meso level and micro level." They label Hernes original theory of state feminism as being at the macro level. Much research has connected state feminism to policy agencies, leaving a narrow scope. To define the meso level they use Threlfall's description of state feminism, "result of the interplay between agitation from below and integration policy from above". The meso level is best defined the interactions between women not present in the state and the bureaucrats. This entails the access which women have to the policy agenda and the target of policy. Lastly, the micro level consists of 4 types. Type A is when an elected government adopts the desires of "board feminists", Type B includes "revolutionary or unelected leaders" action for women, Type C involves elected officials creating policy in support of women, and Type D is the "creation of a women's policy machinery."

=== Women's Policy Agencies ===
Women's policy agencies (WPA) such as the UK's Equal Opportunities Commission or the French's Ministry of Women's Rights are agencies implemented to establish women's participation within the state. WPAs have adjusted feminist movements point of change from outside the government to now within the government. Consequently, WPAs have been used to promote certain agendas, ones which align with current policy agendas and benefit elites. The RNGS found that women's movements are more successful when working with a WPA. Accordingly, when these alliances attain "movement procedural and substantive goals", state feminism has been achieved. The idea of state feminism is often conflated with the creation of women's policy agencies in governments. However, the creation of such policies does not mean that feminist outcomes are taking place according to RNGS. Thus, state feminism should not be confused with the actions taken in regards to agencies in the government that support policies for women.

== State feminism within countries ==
=== Authoritarian states ===
==== Turkey ====
In the 20th century, Turkey's government "preempted feminism". The Turkish national government's program in the 1920s included mandatory de-hijabicization (unveiling of women), access for women to more education and work, and political rights for women, all as part of a national effort to emulate some Western cultural characteristics in a Muslim nation.

In the 1980s, second-wave feminism appeared, among daughters of leading women of Turkey's Kemalist movement, the women being feminist within the government's definition and leadership. The state feminism they followed, according to scholar Margot Badran, covered parts of patriarchy with an appearance of Western progressivity.

In the 21st century, Turkey's government under Recep Tayyip Erdogan has rolled back many women's rights as Turkey becomes more conservative and Islamist. In 2021, Turkey even withdrew from a treaty on women's rights.

==== Yemen ====
In South Yemen, also known as the People's Democratic Republic of Yemen (with the subsequent unification of two Yemen's into one, the former PDRY is now generally south Yemen), state feminism had little effect on patriarchy and did not have much influence beyond Aden, a port city in the PDRY. "Women in the south ... seemed to believe their gains would never be rescinded. They behaved as feminists, if by that is meant shaping the lives of their choice by accessing the new options offered them. But they did not embrace a feminist ideology or identity, as this was preempted by the state. When the socialist regime collapsed, the fragile gains of state feminism went with it." "Northern women had acquired an acute gender consciousness and developed practical feminist skills ... but they had no legitimate political space. Southern women had been able to exploit the educational and professional benefits conferred under state feminism, but they did not have the independent ideological space in which to develop a feminism of their own."

Post-unification Yemen has been analyzed by one author.

=== Liberal democratic states ===
==== Norway ====
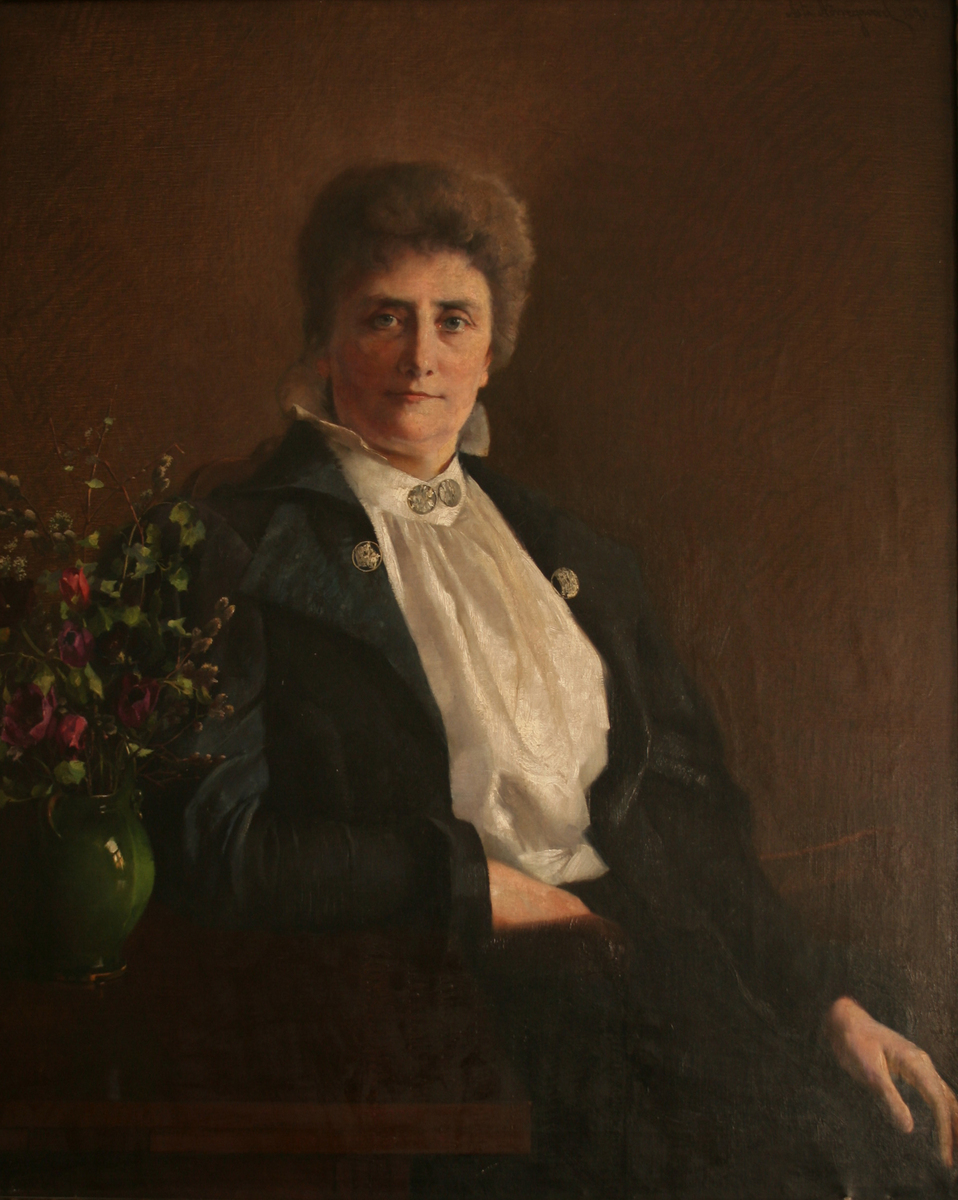
Gina Krog, a liberal politician and the principal leader of the struggle for women's right to vote in Norway

Norway has a tradition of government-supported liberal feminism since 1884, when the Norwegian Association for Women's Rights (NKF) was founded with the support of the progressive establishment within the then-dominant governing Liberal Party (which received 63.4% of the votes in the election the following year); the association's founders included five Norwegian prime ministers and several of its early leaders were married to prime ministers. Rooted in first-wave liberal feminism, it works "to promote gender equality and women's and girls' human rights within the framework of liberal democracy and through political and legal reform." NKF members had key roles in developing the government apparatus and legislation related to gender equality in Norway since 1884; with the professionalization of gender equality advocacy from the 1970s, the "Norwegian government adopted NKF's [equality] ideology as its own" and adopted laws and established government institutions such as the Gender Equality Ombud based on NKF's proposals; the new government institutions to promote gender equality were also largely built and led by prominent NKF members such as Eva Kolstad, NKF's former president and the first Gender Equality Ombud. NKF's feminist tradition has often been described as Norway's state feminism. The term state feminism itself was coined by NKF member Helga Hernes. Although it grew out of 19th century progressive liberalism, Norwegian liberal feminism is not limited to liberalism in a modern party-political sense, and NKF is broadly representative of the democratic political spectrum from the centre-left to the centre-right, including the social democratic Labour Party. Norwegian supreme court justice and former NKF President Karin Maria Bruzelius has described NKF's liberal feminism as "a realistic, sober, practical feminism".

==== Sweden ====
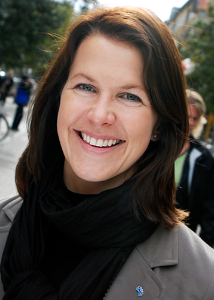
Nina Larsson, current Swedish Minister for Gender Equality

Sweden has been implementing gender equality through government policy since the 1960s. It was not until the 70s and 80s though that Sweden would recognize gender equality as its own policy area. Even then, policy only dealt with labor issues involving gender. In 1976, Sweden would create the position of Minister for Gender Equality who would be responsible for maintaining gender equality. Later, in 1982, the Gender Equality Division was founded to help the minister in the "development of principles of gender equality policy, the preparation of gender equality legislation, and the co-ordination of this legislation with the other ministers." Sweden also has the Gender Equality council which consists of "representatives from the women’s movement... political parties, NGOs and the social partners" and meets with the minister 4 times a year.

Along with previously mentioned government policy, Sweden has also designed its own women policy agencies connecting the government to state feminism. In addition, women's movements have had historical success with government putting into effect their demands. This relationship has created an expectation from women's movements that the Welfare state will bring out "public measures for gender equality". One branch of Swedish women policy agencies is their Women Resource Centres (WRC). WRCs receive public funding to balance out the gender representation of regional development policy. The Swedish government started funding the WRCs in the 1990s after an aliiance formed between "women's movement, feminist researchers and feminist politicians". As of 2005 there was around 150 WRCs in the country.

In 1980 The Act on Equality between Women and Men at Work was passed and along with it came 2 councils to enforce it, the Equal Opportunities Ombudsman and the Equal Opportunities Commission. This policy was initially ineffective because it only covered "discrimination issues on the labour market not covered by collective agreements". A change was made in 1994 which removed the collective agreements exclusion and forced all workplaces over 10 workers to have a gender equality plan.

=== Middle East ===
In the 1980s and 1990s, "feminist activists and scholars in the Middle East assailed the limits of 'state feminism' and exposed its patriarchal dimensions."

=== Communist and socialist states ===
The People's Republic of China included gender equality in its constitution from inception. Its view of state-led women's liberation was implemented through laws reinforcing gender equality in politics, economics, culture, education, and social and family matters. To further develop policy and represent women's interests, it formed the All-China Women's Federation. "Sharon Wesoky characterized the relationship of an emergent women's movement to the [Chinese] state as 'symbiotic,' containing elements of both autonomy and dependence, and operating largely within rather than in opposition to party-state institutions."

Critics of the Chinese approach to state-led feminism contend that its practice from 1946 to 1976 focused on the erasure of gender and made it difficult for women to assert their positions on these issues separate from the male-dominated state apparatus.

After Germany split, the East side saw the implementation of Mütter- und Kinderschutzgesetz. This policy constructed a comprehensive state ran child care program that consequently led to an unprecedented 78 percent employment rate for women The countries centralized government has been attributed to a major reason as to why feminists were able to successfully implement policy Additionally, higher government funding allowed for more ensured success for social programs before reunification.

== Criticism ==
"Many feminists [...] consider the notion of a state feminism to be an oxymoron." Independent women's movements may be prohibited by the government. State feminism can also be a way that the government takes over the role of speaking for and on behalf of women, rather than letting women themselves speak and make demands.

=== Market Feminism ===
Some argue that the term state feminism is dated. This is because the ever-changing political structure has overgrown the complexity which state feminism can represent. During the latter part of the 20th century, the state's source of power was redistributed through supranational unions and federalism. Along with this, a shift of power towards non-elected officials and NGOs meant other actors were now working with along the state to form policy. Through this, policy agencies experienced a depoliticization where governments must not control policy but guide it. Due to this, women movements had to adjust directions towards "professionalization" and "transnationalization". Professionalization consists of forming NGOs and funding gender experts to create their own sources of policy agencies. On the other hand, the transnatinalization of women movements has seen global women's networks working with supranational organizations to implement women's issues into treaties and other international policy. From this, it can gathered that neoliberalism's restructuring of the state have affected how feminist policy is implemented. Kantola and Squires offer a more modern term, "market feminism", which performs similarly but requires that the relationship between "agencies and the movement with the state" be distinctly different in such that they have "specific strategies, funding, and discourses that rely on market ideas and practices."
