= Stein Tønnesson =

Norwegian historian

- Education: Doctor of Philosophy
- Alma mater: University of Oslo
- Scientific career
- Fields: History, Peace and Conflict Studies

Director of Peace Research Institute Oslo
- In office 2001–2009
- Preceded by: Dan Smith (British author)
- Succeeded by: Kristian Berg Harpviken

Stein Dorenfeldt Tønnesson (born 2 December 1953), is a Norwegian historian.

== Career ==
He was the director of the Peace Research Institute Oslo (PRIO) from 2001 to 2009, when he was replaced by Kristian Berg Harpviken. Stein Tønnesson stays on at PRIO as a Research Professor, while at the United States Institute of Peace (USIP) as Jennings Randolph Senior Fellow 2010-11.

Educated at the University of Aarhus and the University of Oslo, he received his dr. philos. in history from the University of Oslo in 1991. Tønnesson's foremost research efforts have been revolution and war in Vietnam, national identity in South-East Asia, the South China Sea conflict, and Norwegian sports history. Tønnesson has also worked as a journalist. His interests the past decade has been in particular global history, globalization and the decades of relative peace in Southeast Asia since 1979.

Stein Tønnesson has worked as Professor of Human Development Studies at the Centre for Development and the Environment (SUM) at the University of Oslo, and has also been a senior research fellow at the Nordic Institute for Asia Studies (NIAS) in Copenhagen.

== Personal life ==
He is a son of professor of history, Kåre Tønnesson. He grew up in Bærum and attended Oslo Cathedral School.
