= Dan Smith (British author) =

Author and peace researcher (born 1951)

Professor Dan Smith
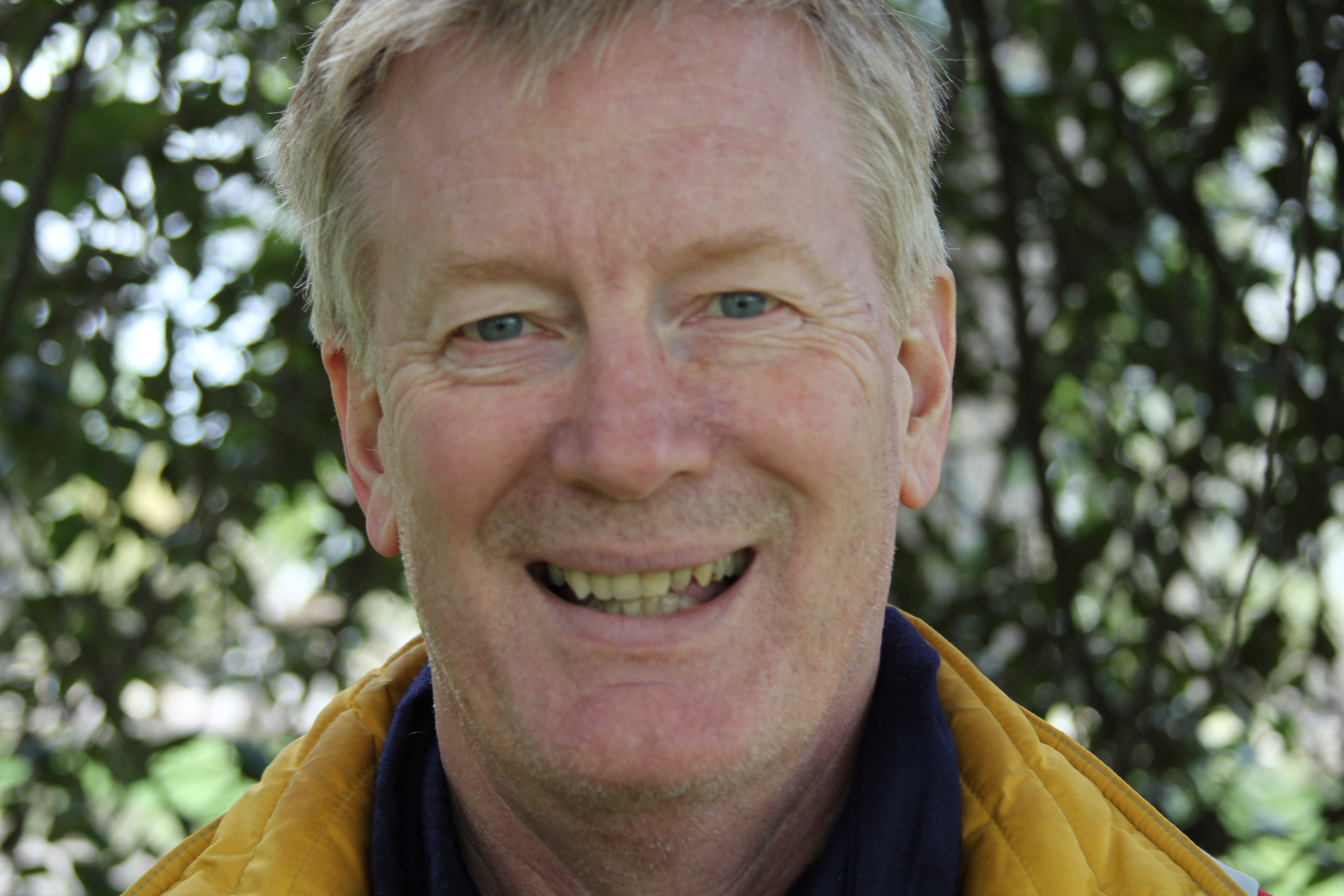

Director of Stockholm International Peace Research Institute
- Incumbent
- Assumed office 2015

Director of Peace Research Institute Oslo
- In office 1993–2001
- Preceded by: Hilde Henriksen Waage
- Succeeded by: Stein Tønnesson

Daniel Mansel Smith OBE (born 17 September 1951) is a British author, cartographer and peace researcher. He is currently the Director of the Stockholm International Peace Research Institute (SIPRI).

Smith was Director of Peace Research Institute Oslo from 1993 to 2001, the Secretary General of the independent peacebuilding organisation International Alert and Professor of Peace and Conflict Studies at the University of Manchester.

== Education and career ==
Smith was educated at Tiffin School, Kingston upon Thames, and Christ's College, Cambridge, where he graduated with a degree in English Literature in 1973. After graduation, he worked for the Campaign for Nuclear Disarmament before taking up research on UK defence policies in 1976. He was a fellow first of the Richardson Institute for Conflict and Peace Research (located at that time in London) and then of the Department of Economics at Birkbeck College in London.

During the 1980s Smith worked as a freelance researcher and writer. In 1989 he became co-director of the Transnational Institute in Amsterdam, becoming its sole director in 1991, and then moving to Oslo where he was Director of the international Peace Research Institute Oslo (PRIO) from 1993 to 2001. In 2001 he held a brief fellowship at the Norwegian Nobel Institute and in 2003 at the Hellenic Foundation for Foreign and European Policy (ELIAMEP) in Athens.

Smith was the Secretary General of International Alert between December 2003 and August 2015.

In 2013 Smith was appointed part-time Professor of Peace and Conflict at the University of Manchester’s Humanitarian and Conflict Response Institute.

In September 2015, Smith left International Alert and became the Director of the Stockholm International Peace Research Institute (SIPRI).

== Honours and honorary positions ==
Dan Smith was nominated by the UK government and appointed by the UN Secretary-General to be a member of the UN Peacebuilding Fund’s Advisory Group in 2007, and became Chairman of the group for 2010 through 2011, when he stood down.

He was Chairman of the Board of the London-based NGO Institute for War and Peace Reporting from 1993 until 2006.

He was awarded the OBE in 2002.

== Selected publications ==
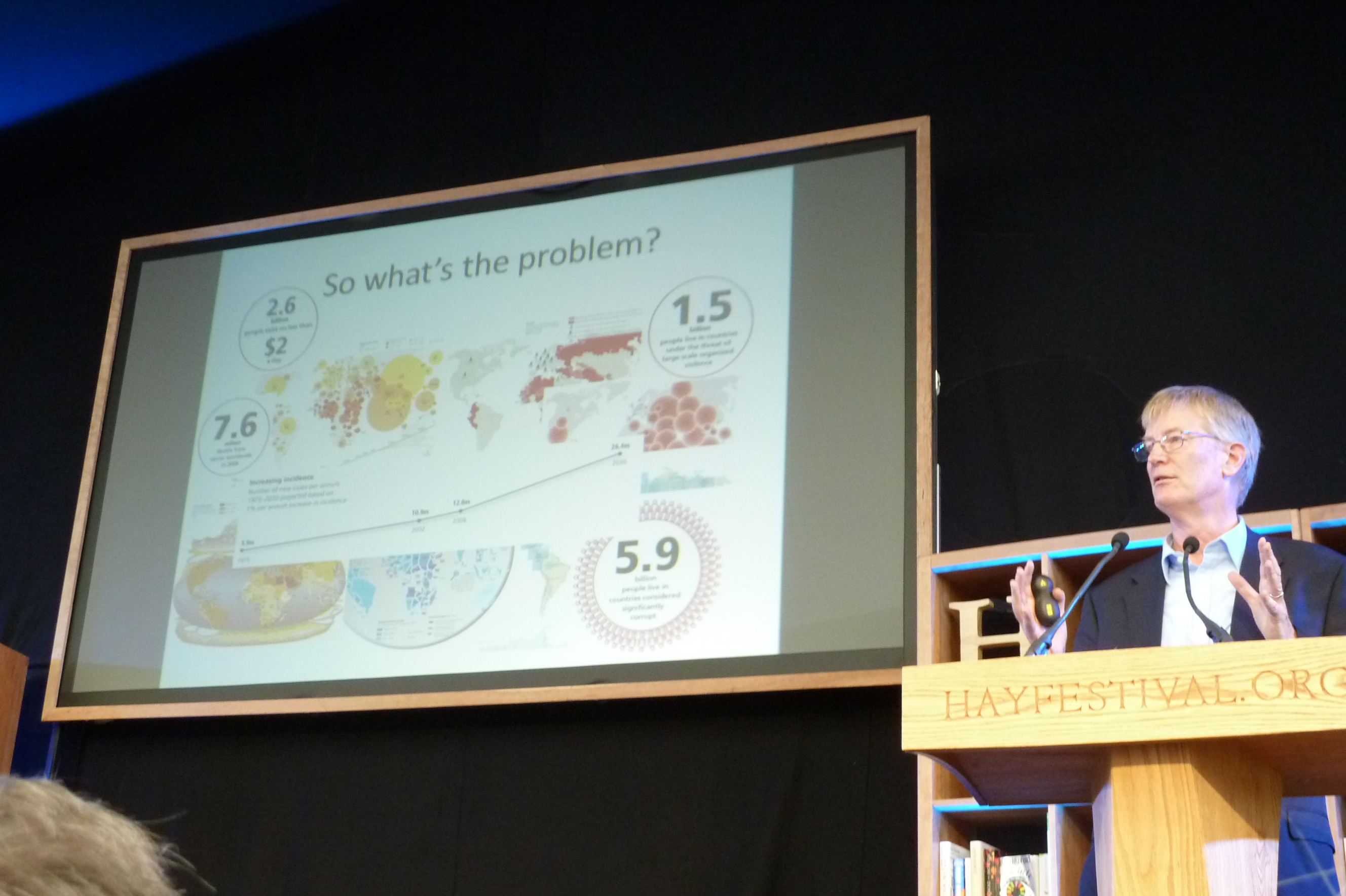
Smith presenting the 9th edition of the State of the World Atlas at the Hay Festival on 31 May 2013

- The Defence of the Realm in the 1980s (1980)
- Protest and Survive (co-edited with EP Thompson) (1980)
- The Penguin Atlas of War and Peace – four editions since 1983, the first two (1983 & 1991) co-authored with Michael Kidron, the 3rd & 4th (1997 & 2003) as sole author.
- Prospectus for a Habitable Planet (co-edited with EP Thompson) (1987)
- European Security in the 1990s (ed) (1989)
- Gender, Peace and Conflict (co-edited with Inger Skjelsbæk) (2001)
- The State of the Middle East, 1st edition (2006)
- The State of the Middle East, 2nd edition (2008)
- The State of the World Atlas, 6th edition (1999)
- The State of the World Atlas, 7th edition (2003)
- The State of the World Atlas, 8th edition (2008), ranked in "The 10 Best Atlases" by The Independent newspaper.
- The State of the World Atlas, 9th edition (2013), which Stephen Williams of the New African said comprised "extraordinary statistics... made instantly understandable by the excellent graphics".

Smith is also responsible for over 100 articles in journals and periodicals and chapters in anthologies, as well as a number of reports, of which the two most significant are:

- Towards a Strategic Framework for Peacebuilding: Getting Their Act Together (2004), published by the Norwegian Ministry of Foreign Affairs.
- A Climate of Conflict (2007) co-authored with Janani Vivekananda and published by International Alert.

Smith authored three crime novels, all published by Macmillan: Fathers’ Law (1986), Serious Crimes (1987) and The Fourth Crow (1989).
