= Youth bulge theory =

Youth bulge theory, also known as the youth bulge theory of conflict, is a concept used in the academic field of international relations, that considers the impact of a disproportionately high level of young people in a given population. This is demonstrated in terms of economic pressures, political and social unrest, riots, rebellions, and in some cases more organised examples of political violence, with consequent potential impacts on neighbouring countries and regional stability. The field of political demography has an overlap with this terminology, and Jack Goldstone is among those academics that have considered the concept.

== History of the term ==
The term "youth bulge" was first used by the French sociologist Gaston Bouthoul in 1970, who suggested that war was deferred infanticide, the killing of surplus men, and that demographic surges could therefore create the conditions for aggression and then war. Gunnar Heinsohn in 2003 made a specific connection between civil unrest and youth bulges. From 2006 Henrik Urdal brought the term more widely into the international relations discipline though empirical analysis covering multiple potential outcomes.

== Definitions ==
The age and shape definitions of the youth bulge is used in different ways by different academics, but one definition used is "large cohorts" in the age ranges 15 to 24 years, other academics use the range 15 to 30 years. Different organisations have their own definitions of the age range, and there are additionally divergences as to defined the size of the bulge. Gunnar Heinsohn, in the context of the 2007–2008 Kenyan crisis, suggested that this bulge exists if 30-40% of the population is between 15 and 29 years old, which if present is capable of driving up communal violence.

== Usage ==
The use of youth bulge theory in academic literature is widespread. Its application is particularly prevalent in respect of the Global South, given demographic trends in the last century. The theory is most usually applied to the period from 1945 onwards, but has been applied to Europe's imperial ambitions in the 16th-century, as well as in revolutionary Europe in 1848.

== Empirical studies ==
One writer whose work in this area has been commented by other academics is Henrik Urdal. He undertook an empirical study, A Clash of Generations? Youth Bulges and Political Violence, published in 2006. He modeled population data against 3 particular types of unrest: armed conflict, terrorism and rioting, and based on a 15-24 year age bracket. His conclusion was that all three types of violence are linked to youth bulges. Urdal followed this with further studies in 2008 and 2012, where he reached the view that youth bulges are very much associated with the onset of armed conflict: a 35% youth bulge increases the risk of armed conflict by 150%, compared to countries with a more conventional demographic profile (under 17% between 15-24 years, with a median of 15%). Each percentage point increase in this bulge adds 4% to the risk of conflict. However there was no such correlation with the risk of major wars, and that most countries with youth bulges nevertheless manage not to have conflict most of the time.

== Youth bulge pressure points ==
The components of youth bulge theory, when considering the negative factors relate to where the state cannot readily meet the expectations of a large youth group. Unmet expectations can lead to a festering sense of grievance, unrest and organised political violence. This violence is more likely if employment or incomes are insufficient, particularly during economic downturns, which in turn can lead younger populations become radicalised.

One option for governments facing these pressures, but unable to improve employment options, is to expand educational options instead, in the hope of reducing some of the pressures of radicalism but it is open to challenge as to whether this is an effective tactic, there are arguments that radical groups find it easier to recruit students. Migration to richer countries can also reduce this pressure, Heinsohn described it as a "safety valve".

== Youth bulge theory examples ==
Heinsohn consider the case of Kenya, when writing in 2008. Kenya was one of approximately 40 countries going through what he termed "demographic rearmament", present when the equivalent of 1,000 males aged 40 to 44 are succeeded by at least 2,500 boys aged 0 to 4 years old. In Kenya the figure was 4,190, which in his view would risk social upheaval.

== Criticisms ==
Youth bulge theory has been challenged by some academics. The criticisms relate to the over-use of the theory in discussions on young people in international relations, particularly among American foreign policy analysts; the risk of reductionism down to "too many young men"; and ignoring feminist viewpoints in the study of international relations. This critique suggests that the theory is based on flawed theoretical assumptions, leading to less effective policy-making outcomes. One line of argument sees a value in the application of critical gender analysis, as an alternative to dominant ideas about youth, violence and conflict.. Some academics have noted the risk of Islamophobia creeping into this analysis, given that many affected countries have significant Muslim populations.

Though much of the academic work in this field has highlighted the negative impacts of the theory, there are, at least theoretically, positive outcomes in terms of a "demographic dividend", a younger workforce available to drive up economic growth.
