= Hege Skjeie =

Norwegian political scientist

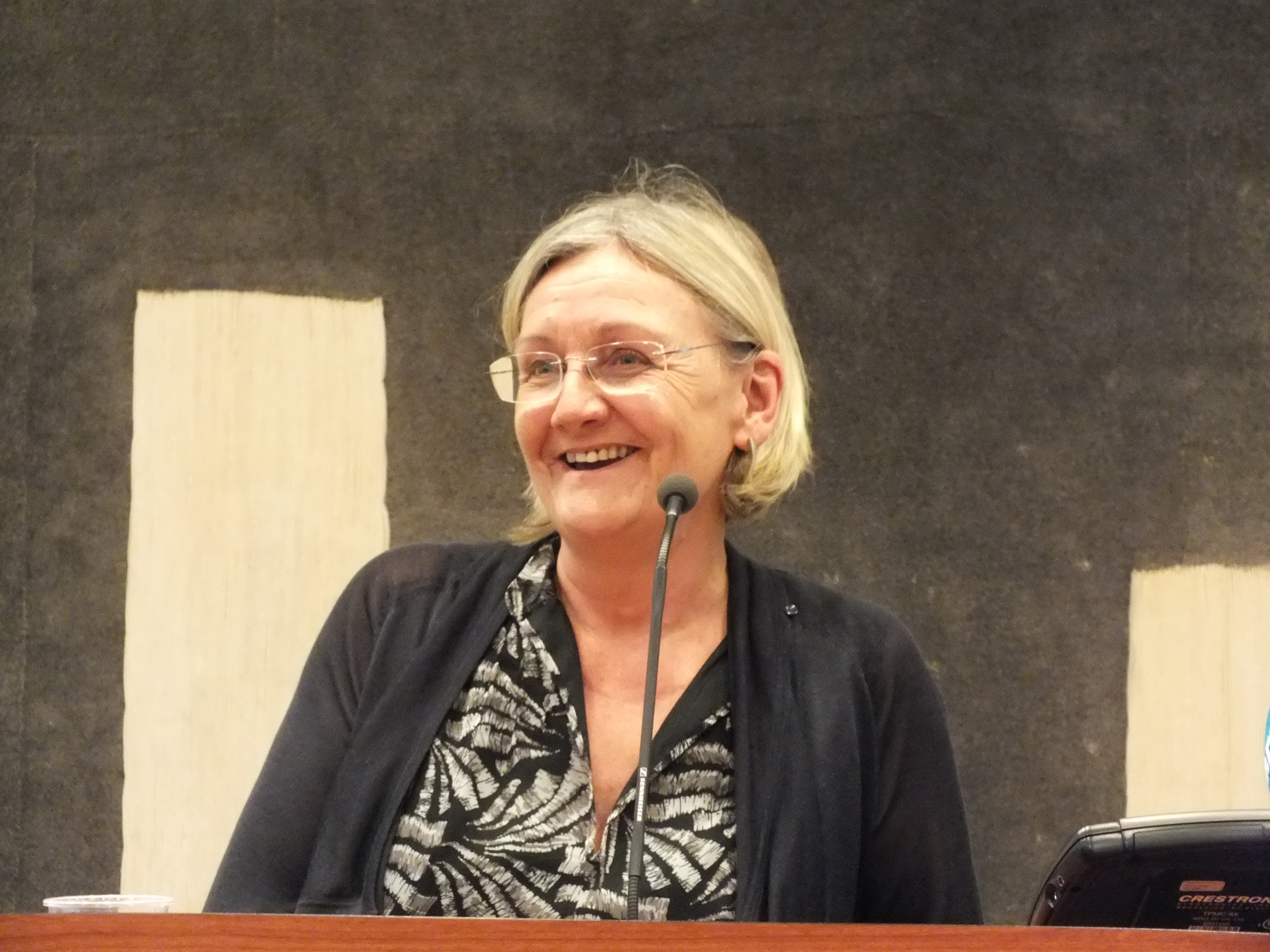
- Hege Skjeie, 2012
- Born: 15 May 1955; Kristiansand
- Died: 5 October 2018 (aged 63)

Hege Skjeie (15 May 1955 – 5 October 2018) was a Norwegian political scientistand feminist.

== Biography ==
She became a Dr. Polit. in political science in 1992 and was hired as associate professor of political science at the University of Oslo in 1997. She was promoted to professor in 2000, and thus became Norway's first female Professor of Political Science. In 2010, she was appointed chairperson of the Equality Commission (also known as the Skjeie Commission) by the Government of Norway, established by a royal decree of 12 February 2010 in order to report on Norway's equality policies.

She worked as a researcher at the Norwegian Institute for Social Research from 1984 to 1997, and was a visiting scholar at Harvard University from 1988 to 1989. She was adjunct professor at Aalborg University from 2008 to 2012. She was also a columnist for the newspaper Dagens Næringsliv.

== Selected publications ==
- Skjeie, Hege (2006). "Menneskerettighetene - en trussel mot demokratiet?". In Anette Borchorst; Ann-Dorte Christensen (eds.). Kønsrefleksioner - om magt og mangfoldighed. Vol. 7. Aalborg Universitetsforlag. pp. 111–132. ISBN 87-7307-746-1.
- Skjeie, Hege (2006). "Equality law and religious gender discrimination: Norwegian examples". In Kari Elisabeth Børresen; Sara Cabbibo (eds.). Gender, religion, human rights in Europe. Herder editrice e libreria. pp. 165–179. ISBN 978-88-89670-15-6.
- Skjeie, Hege; Teigen, Mari (2007). "Likestilling og minoritetspolitikk". Tidsskrift for Kjønnsforskning (2): 21–38. ISSN 0809-6341.
- Skjeie, Hege; Teigen, Mari (2007). "Behov for balanse". Tidsskrift for Kjønnsforskning (4): 86–93. ISSN 0809-6341.
- Skjeie, Hege (2007). "Religious exemptions to equality". Critical Review of International Social and Political Philosophy. 10 (4): 471–490. doi:10.1080/13698230701660188. hdl:10852/48853. ISSN 1369-8230. S2CID 144052559.
- Skjeie, Hege (2007). "8. Headscarves in schools: European comparisons". In Titia Loenen; Jenny Goldschmidt (eds.). Religious pluralism and human rights in Europe: Where to draw the line?. Intersentia. pp. 129–145. ISBN 978-90-5095-642-0.
- Skjeie, Hege (2008). "4. Religious exemptions to equality". In Birte Siim; Judith Squires (eds.). Contesting Citizenship. Routledge. pp. 69–88. ISBN 978-0-415-36671-7.
- Skjeie, Hege (2008). "13. Multiple equality claims in the practice of the Norwegian anti-discrimination agencies". In Dagmar Schiek; Victoria Chege (eds.). European Union Non-discrimination Law. Comparative perspectives on multidimensional equality law. Routledge. pp. 295–310. ISBN 978-0-415-45722-4.
- Skjeie, Hege (2008). "4. Kjønnsrelatert forfølgelse som grunnlag for asyl, I". In Hege Skjei; Inger Skjelsbæk; Torunn L. Tryggestad (eds.). Kjønn, krig, konflikt. Jubileumsbok til Helga Hernes. Pax Forlag. pp. 60–78. ISBN 978825303098-2.
- Siim, B; Skjeie, Hege (2008). "Tracks, intersections and dead ends - Multicultural challenges to state feminism in Denmark and Norway" (PDF). Ethnicities. 8 (3): 22–344. doi:10.1177/1468796808092446. hdl:2262/52636. ISSN 1468-7968. S2CID 140523231.
- Skjeie, Hege; Skjelsbæk, Inger; Tryggestad, Torunn L., eds. (2008). Kjønn, krig, konflikt. Jubileumsbok til Helga Hernes. Pax Forlag. ISBN 978825303098-2.
- Skjeie, Hege; Langvasbråten, Trude (2009). "Intersectionality in practice? Anti-discrimination reforms in Norway". International Feminist Journal of Politics. 11 (4): 513–529. doi:10.1080/14616740903237483. hdl:10852/48851. ISSN 1461-6742. S2CID 39033313.
- Skjeie, Hege (2009). "Policy views on the incorporation of human right conventions - CEDAW in Norwegian law". Nordisk Tidsskrift for Menneskerettigheter. 27 (2): 260–271. ISSN 1503-6480.
- Skjeie, Hege (2010). "10. National implementation of human rights: a threat to "representative democracy"?"". In Pauline Stoltz; Marina Svensson; Zhongxin Sun; Qi Wang (eds.). Gender Equality, Citizenship and Human Rights. Controversies and Challenges in China and the Nordic Countries. Routledge. pp. 179–188. ISBN 978-0-415-56176-1.
