= Journal of Peace Research =

- Discipline: International relations
- Language: English
- Edited by: Gudrun Østby and Sebastian Schutte

Publication details
- History: 1964–present
- Publisher: SAGE Publications for the Peace Research Institute Oslo (Norway)
- Frequency: Bimonthly
- Impact factor: 3.4 (2023)

Standard abbreviations
- ISO 4: J. Peace Res.

Indexing
- ISSN: 0022-3433 (print); 1460-3578 (web)
- LCCN: 65009857
- OCLC no.: 01607337

Links
- Journal homepage

The Journal of Peace Research is a bimonthly peer-reviewed academic journal that publishes scholarly articles and book reviews in the fields of peace and conflict studies, conflict resolution, and international security. It was established by Johan Galtung in 1964 and emerged as a leading journal in the field of peace and conflict studies and International Relations under the editorship of Nils Petter Gleditsch (1976-1977, 1983-2010). The current editors-in-chief are Gudrun Østby and Sebastian Schutte (all are/were researchers at the Peace Research Institute Oslo).

== Abstracting and indexing ==
Journal of Peace Research is abstracted and indexed in Scopus and the Social Sciences Citation Index. According to the Journal Citation Reports, its 2022 impact factor is 3.6, ranking it 15th out of 160 journals in the category "International Relations".

== See also ==
- List of political science journals
