= Kristian Berg Harpviken =

Norwegian sociologist and researcher

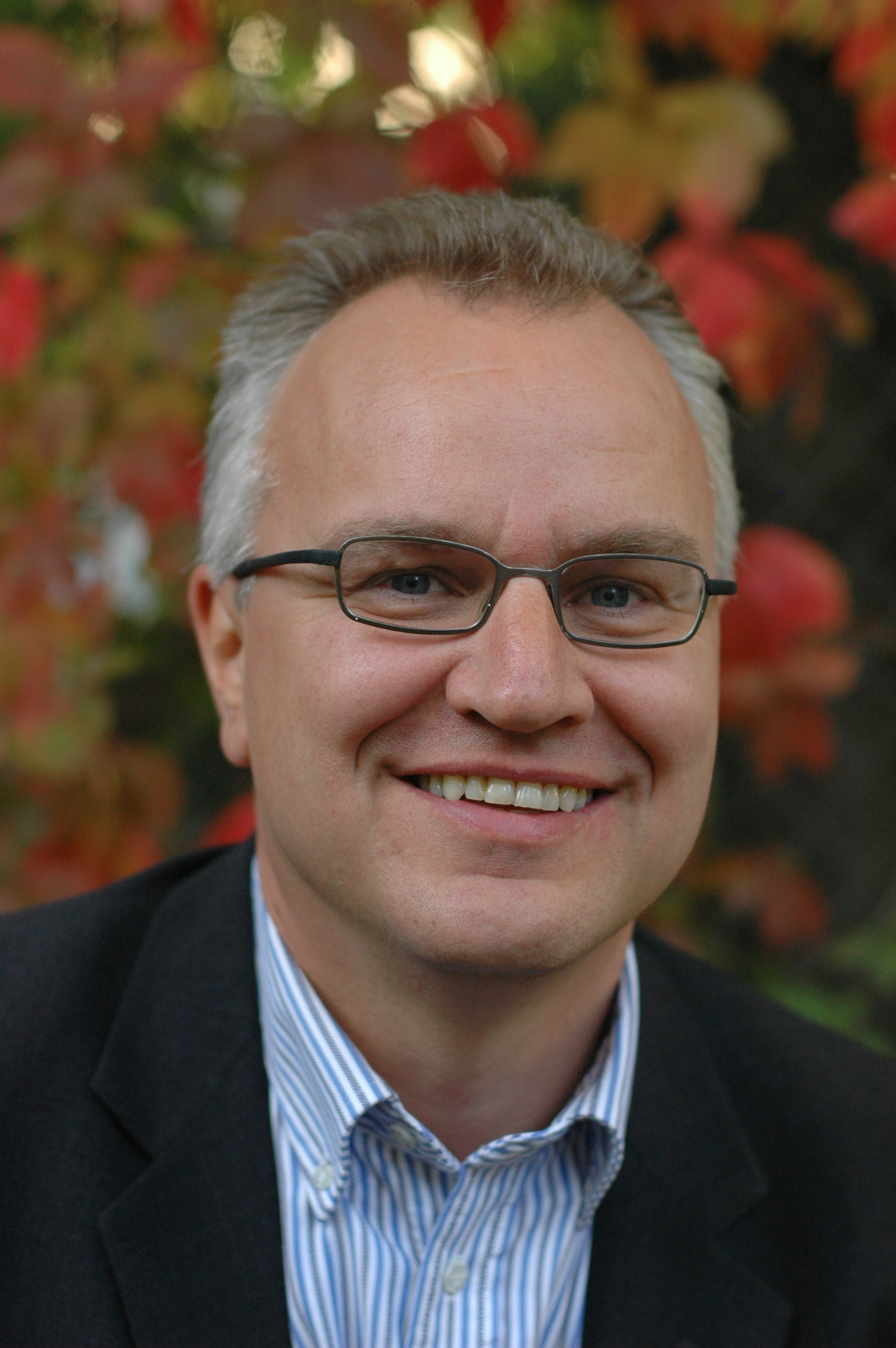
- Kristian Berg Harpviken in 2007
- Born: 27 December 1961 (age 64); Lillehammer, Norway
- Education: University of Oslo
- Scientific career
- Fields: Sociology, Peace and conflict studies
- Workplaces: Norwegian Nobel Institute, Peace Research Institute Oslo

Director of Norwegian Nobel Institute
- Preceded by: Olav Njølstad

Kristian Berg Harpviken (born 27 December 1961) is a Norwegian sociologist and researcher, and since 2025 director of the Norwegian Nobel Institute.

Harpviken is foremost known for his competence on Afghanistan, where he has travelled extensively and conducted multiple field works since he first engaged with the country in 1989. He served as director of the Peace Research Institute Oslo (PRIO) for the period 2009–2017.

== Education and work experience ==
Harpviken has both practical and academic education. He is a trained horticulturalist and has worked as a farmer for several years. He has his cand.mag., 4 years undergraduate degree (1989) and cand.polit., 2 years post-graduate degree (1995) from University of Oslo, both in Sociology. He has been a guest researcher at the University of Chicago (1998) and Georgetown University (2008).

His cand. polit. thesis (equivalent to an M. Phil.) was entitled Political Mobilization Among the Hazara of Afghanistan, 1978–1992. In 2006 he defended his doctoral dissertation in sociology, entitled Networks in Transition: Wartime Migration in Afghanistan. Besides the main concentration on sociology, he has studied business and development studies.

Between studies, Harpviken has served as agricultural coordinator and director for the Norwegian Afghanistan Committee in Peshawar, Pakistan (1990–92). He also served 4 months conscientious objector duty for the same organization in 1989. Harpviken fulfilled 12 months compulsory military service in 1981, and trained as a conscript sergeant with specialization in mortars.

Since 1993, Harpviken has been affiliated with PRIO, first as a student associate, from 1995 as researcher, then moving on to positions as senior researcher, programme leader, deputy director, and director. After his director term 2009–2017 was concluded, he stayed on as senior researcher and research professor, up until he took up the directorship at the Norwegian Nobel Institute in January 2025.

Harpviken has participated and led multiple long-term research projects on anti-personnel landmines, internally displaced and refugees, peacebuilding, as well as regional security. Additionally, he has provided consultancy services to several international NGOs and multilateral organizations.

== Research interests ==
Harpviken's expertise and research interests include the dynamics of civil war (mobilization, conflict resolution, post-war reconstruction and peacebuilding), migration and transnational communities, and methodology in difficult contexts. Geographically, his research is primarily focused on Afghanistan and the region, but he also has fieldwork experience from Angola, Bosnia-Herzegovina, Iran, Mozambique, Pakistan; in large part related to the landmine situation and the landmine campaign. He has taught several courses on methodology in crisis situations both for practitioners and graduate university students.

== Dissemination and outreach ==
Harpviken frequently comments in national media on the situation in Afghanistan, and he is also concerned with Norway's peace policy and other aspects of foreign policy. As director of PRIO, he speculated and commented each year on the Nobel Peace Prize in media outlets from all over the world.

In 2009, he was awarded the Norwegian Sociological Association's (Eastern branch) Dissemination Award.

== Bibliography (selected) ==
- Kristian Berg Harpviken & Sarah Lischer, 2013. "Refugee Militancy in Exile and Upon Return in Afghanistan and Rwanda", in Jeff Checkel (ed.): Transnational Dynamics of Civil War, Cambridge: Cambridge University Press.
- Kristian Berg Harpviken, 2012. "The Transnationalization of the Taliban", International Area Studies Review, 15(3): 203–229.
- Kristian Berg Harpviken, 2012. "Warlordism: Three Biographies from Southeastern Afghanistan", in Astri Suhrke & Mats Berdal (eds.): The Peace in Between: Post-war Violence and Peacebuilding, London: Routledge.
- Kristian Berg Harpviken, 2011. "A Peace Nation in the War on Terror: The Norwegian Engagement in Afghanistan", in Nik Hynek & Peter Marton (eds.): Statebuilding in Afghanistan: Multinational Contributions to Reconstruction, London: Routledge.
- Kaja Borchgrevink & Kristian Berg Harpviken, 2010. "Afghanistan: Civil Society Between Modernity and Tradition", in Thania Pfaffenholz (ed.): Civil Society and Peacebuilding, Boulder, CO: Lynne Rienner, pp. 235–257.
- Kristian Berg Harpviken (ed.) 2010. Comparative Social Research, Volume 27 – Troubled Regions and Failing States: The Clustering and Contagion og Armed Conflicts. Bingley, UK: Emerald.
- Kristian Berg Harpviken, 2010. "Caught in the Middle? Regional Perspectives on Afghanistan", Comparative Social Research, Vol. 27: 277–305. Bingley, UK: Emerald.
- Astri Suhrke, Torunn Wimpelmann Chaudhary, Aziz Hakimi, Kristian Berg Harpviken, Akbar Sarwari & Arne Strand, 2009. Conciliatory Approaches to the Insurgency in Afghanistan: An Overview, CMI Report 2009:1. Bergen: Chr. Michelsen Institute.
- Kristian Berg Harpviken, 2009. Social Networks and Migration in Wartime Afghanistan. Basingstoke: Palgrave Macmillan.
- Kristian Berg Harpviken & Hanne Eggen Røislien, 2008. "Faithful Brokers? Potentials and Pitfalls of Religion in Peacemaking", Conflict Resolution Quarterly, 25(3): 351–373.
- Kristian Berg Harpviken (ed.), 2004. The Future of Humanitarian Mine Action. Basingstoke: Macmillan.
- Kristian Berg Harpviken, 2003. "Afghanistan: From Buffer State to Battleground – to Bridge Between Regions?", in James Hentz og Morten Bøås (ed.): New and Critical Security and Regionalism: Beyond the Nation State, Aldershot: Ashgate, pp. 152–176.
- Astri Suhrke, Kristian Berg Harpviken & Arne Strand, 2003. "After Bonn: Conflictual Peacebuilding", Third World Quarterly, 23(4):875–891.
- Kristian Berg Harpviken, 1997. "Transcending Traditionalism: The Emergence of Non-State Military Formations in Afghanistan", Journal of Peace Research
- Kristian Berg Harpviken, 1996. Political Mobilisation Among the Hazara of Afghanistan: 1978–1992, Rapportserien ved Sosiologi, Nr 9:1996, Oslo: Institutt for Sosiologi, Universitetet i Oslo.
