= Tønnes =

Masculine given name

Tønnes is a Norwegian given name. Notable people with the name include:

- Tønnes Andenæs (1923–1975), Norwegian politician
- Tønnes Oksefjell (1901–1976), Norwegian politician
- Tønnes Stang Rolfsen (born 1988), Norwegian luger
