= Income distribution in China =

China has been one of the fastest growing economies in the world since the implementation of its reform policies in the late 1970s. This economic growth has been accompanied by a rapid increase in income inequality that China's Gini coefficient increased from 0.310 in 1981 to 0.468 in 2018. Several policies have been introduced with the aim to alleviate the income inequality in China.

== Minimum wage policy ==
In China, there is no national minimum wage. Local governments are responsible for setting the minimum wages according to their own local conditions. In 2004, the government introduced a new minimum age law with tighter restrictions and supervision on calculation and application, which required local governments to renew the minimum wages at least once every two years. In 2016, the Ministry of Human Resources and Social Security adjusted its policy to allow provinces greater autonomy in determining minimum wage increases. Local governments are now required to raise the minimum wage at least once every three years.

Minimum wage by region (as of March, 2021)
Region	Monthly Minimum Wage (RMB)
Shanghai	2480
Shenzhen	2200
Beijing	2000
Xiamen	1800
Shannxi (Xi'an)	1950

The minimum wage policy helps reduce the total income gap at the bottom end of income distribution, and the minimum wage regulations may cause unemployment for low-wage workers, especially in the eastern and central regions. In 2016, the average minimum wage in the eastern area was RMB 1663 while it was RMB 1503 in the western region. Considering the labour cost, businesses tend to move production to the western region where the minimum wage is lower.

In 2020, under exceptional circumstances of COVID-19 pandemic, majority of provincial governments issued notice allowing no adjustment of minimum wage on the previous year's rate.

== Reforms of the taxation system ==
In October, 2018, China raised the monthly income tax-free threshold from RMB3500 to RMB5000. Also, starting from 2019, six types of tax deductions are added, including children's education, continuing education, health treatment for serious diseases, housing loan interests, rent and elderly care.

== Reforms to increase rural incomes ==
To increase the rural incomes and reduce the rural-urban income inequality, the government abolished the agricultural tax and prohibit the collection of fees by local governments in 2004. In 2008, in order to improve the productivity of land and optimism the allocation of land resources, transfer of rural land was encouraged. Also, subsidies are provided to support and protect agriculture. In 2011, 140.6 billion yuan was paid for subsidies for grain production, planting superior seed varieties purchasing farm machinery and tools, and purchasing agricultural supplies.

== Policies to improve the equality of education ==
Average years of schooling increased from 6.79 years in 1996 to 8.28 years in 2008. Today, nine years of education has become compulsory and universal. Series of government policies were adapted to promote equalization of education. In order to remove financial barriers that restrict poor families' access to compulsory education in rural areas, tuition fees, miscellaneous fees and textbook fees are exempted in 2006. This policy was further extended to central and eastern China in 2007.
