= Kåre Tønnesson =

Norwegian historian and professor (1926–2019)

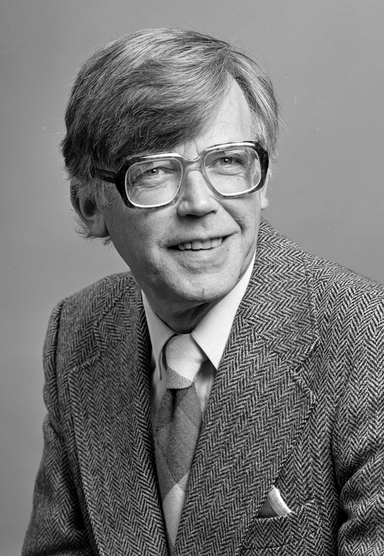
Kåre Tønnesson, 1981

Kåre Dorenfeldt Tønnesson (1 January 1926 – 26 September 2019) was a Norwegian historian and professor at the University of Oslo.

He finished his secondary education at Valler in 1944. After enrolling in philological studies at the University of Oslo in 1945 he graduated with the cand.philol. degree in history in 1952. His master's thesis delved into causality in the writings of Alexis de Tocqueville. In 1959 Tønnesson took the dr.philos. degree with the thesis La défaite des sans-culottes, "The Defeat of the Sans-culottes".

He was a lecturer in history at the University of Oslo from 1958, research fellow from 1960, docent from 1964 and professor from 1969 to 1991. From 1973 to 1975 he was the dean at the Faculty of History and Philosophy. After retiring from the professorship, he was a scholar in NAVF and the Research Council of Norway. Larger works include volume four of Sentraladministrasjonens historie in 1979 and volume ten of Aschehougs verdenshistorie in 1985. This was also translated into Swedish and was reissued in 2001. In 1989 he marked the 200th anniversary of the French Revolution with the book Revolusjonen som rystet Europa. The book was published in Norwegian and also translated into Swedish. In 2007 he released a biography on Madame de Staël.

A Festschrift in Tønnesson's honor was released in 1995,. He was a fellow of the Norwegian Academy of Science and Letters.

Tønnesson was born in Ski, and grew up in Bærum. He died in September 2019 aged 93. He was the father of Stein Tønnesson.
