= Review of Development Economics =

- Discipline: Economics and Development Economics
- Language: English
- Edited by: Sanghamitra Bandyopadhyay, (Queen Mary University of London), Katsushi Imai (The University of Manchester), Wanglin Ma (Lincoln University, NZ) and Andy McKay (University of Sussex)

Publication details
- History: 1997-Present
- Publisher: John Wiley & Sons
- Frequency: Quarterly
- Impact factor: 0.716 (2018)

Standard abbreviations
- ISO 4: Rev. Dev. Econ.

Indexing
- ISSN: 1363-6669 (print); 1467-9361 (web)
- LCCN: 97641073
- OCLC no.: 39082077

Links
- Journal homepage; Online access; Online archive

Review of Development Economics is a quarterly peer-reviewed academic journal published by John Wiley & Sons. The journal was established in 1997. The founding editors Ira Gang, Sajal Lahiri, Sugata Marjit, Xiaokai Yang and E. Kwan Choi asked the question Once war and famine are vanquished, what changes will economic growth bring to developing countries? And argued that their journal would provide a space for development economists to ponder this broad question and more....and that the journal would be an outlet for high-quality research in the ever-expanding area of development economics and related disciplines.

This journal publishes articles on topics in development economics like growth theory, natural resources, productivity and technological change.

According to the Journal Citation Reports, the journal has a 2018 impact factor of 0.716, ranking it 37th out of 41 journals in the category "Development Studies" and 279th out of 363 journals in the category "Economics".
