= International Area Studies Review =

- Discipline: Politics
- Language: English
- Edited by: Scott Gates

Publication details
- History: 1997-present
- Publisher: SAGE Publications
- Frequency: Quarterly
- Impact factor: 0.7 (2022)

Standard abbreviations
- ISO 4: Int. Area Stud. Rev.

Indexing
- ISSN: 2233-8659 (print); 2049-1123 (web)
- OCLC no.: 841151237

Links
- Journal homepage; Online access; Online archive

The International Area Studies Review is a peer-reviewed academic journal published by SAGE Publications on behalf of the Center for International Area Studies (Hankuk University of Foreign Studies) and the Peace Research Institute Oslo. It covers all aspects of international area studies. The editor-in-chief is Scott Gates (Peace Research Institute Oslo). It was established in 1997 and is published by SAGE Publications.

== Abstracting and indexing ==
The journal is abstracted and indexed in EBSCOhost, ProQuest, and Scopus.
