= Peace Research Institute Oslo =

Norwegian private research institute

- Institutt for fredsforskning
- Abbreviation: PRIO
- Formation: 1959; 67 years ago
- Founder: Johan Galtung
- Type: Research institute
- Headquarters: Oslo, Norway
- Staff: c. 100
- Website: prio.org

The Peace Research Institute Oslo (PRIO; Norwegian: Institutt for fredsforskning) is a private research institution in peace and conflict studies, based in Oslo, Norway, with around 100 employees. It was founded in 1959 by a group of Norwegian researchers led by Johan Galtung, who was also the institute's first director (1959–1969). It publishes the Journal of Peace Research, also founded by Johan Galtung.

== History and governance ==
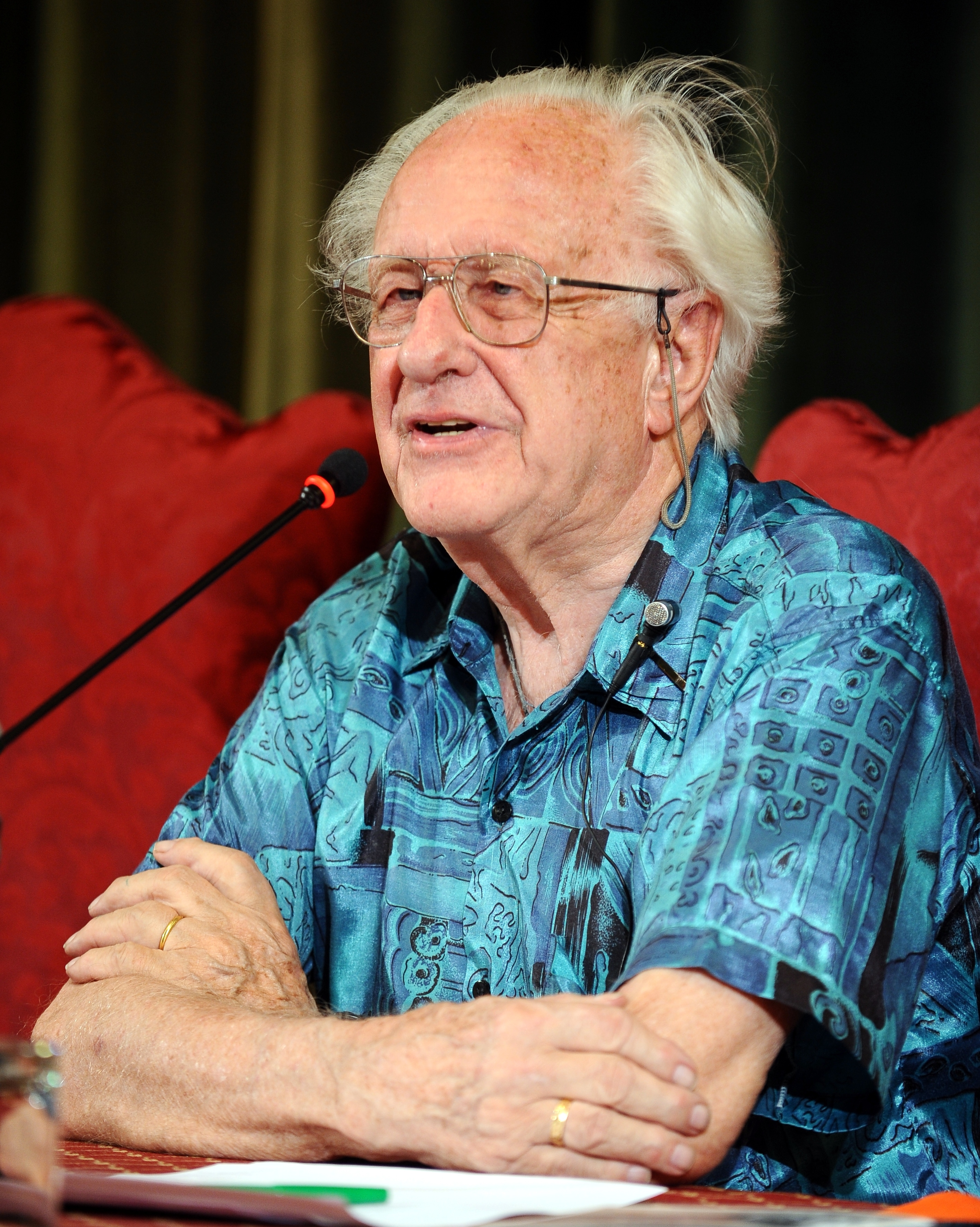
Johan Galtung, PRIO's founder and first director, is regarded as the principal founder of peace and conflict studies, and coined the term peacebuilding

PRIO was founded in 1959 by a group of Norwegian researchers led by Johan Galtung. The institute originally was a department of the Norwegian Institute for Social Research in Oslo and became an independent institute in 1966. It was one of the first centres of peace research in the world, and it is Norway's only peace research institute. The institute's director since 2017 is Henrik Urdal, with Torunn Tryggestad as deputy director. Since 2005, the institute has been located in the former gas works building in central Oslo.

PRIO is an independent foundation, governed by a seven-member board. The board includes two PRIO employees, two members appointed by the Research Council of Norway, one member appointed by the Institute for Social Research, one by the University of Oslo, and one by the Nordic International Studies Association.

Previous PRIO directors are, chronologically, Johan Galtung (1959–69), Asbjørn Eide (1970, 1980–81), Helge Hveem (1971), Nils Petter Gleditsch (1972, 1977–78), Kjell Skjelsbæk (1973–74), Ole Kristian Holthe (1975–76), Tord Høivik (1979–80, 1984–86), Marek Thee (1981–83), Sverre Lodgaard (1986–92), Hilde Henriksen Waage (const., 1992–93), Dan Smith (1993–2001), Stein Tønnesson (2001–09), Kristian Berg Harpviken (2009–2017), and Henrik Urdal (2017–present). After Galtung's resignation in 1969, the institute staff elected a leader for one year at a time. In 1986, this was changed to a three-year period, and again in 1993 to a maximum of two consecutive four-year periods.

PRIOs first chairman of the board was Erik Rinde (1966–79), director of Institute for Social Research. He was succeeded by Torstein Eckhoff (1979–1986), Bernt Bull (1987–94), Frida Nokken (1995–2000), Helge Pharo (2000–2003), Øyvind Østerud (2004–06), Bernt Aardal (2007–2016) and Åslaug Marie Haga (2016 – present).

PRIO is mainly funded by the Research Council of Norway and the Ministry of Foreign Affairs, with some additional funding from the Ministry of Defence, various international organisations such as the World Bank and the European Union, and private foundations. PRIO has around 100 employees. Its headquarters are located in central Oslo.

== Research ==
The Peace Research Institute Oslo

The institute's purpose, as formulated in the statutes, is "to engage in research concerning the conditions for peaceful relations between nations, groups and individuals". Researchers come from a variety of disciplines in the social sciences and humanities, including political science, sociology, anthropology, psychology, human geography, history, history of religion, and philosophy. Output from the research is primarily published as articles in peer-reviewed academic journals, anthologies or monographs, but also as more policy-oriented reports and papers such as PRIO's in-house series.

Approximately 15 percent of the institute's budget is made up of a core grant from the Research Council of Norway, and the remaining 85 per cent is funded on project basis. The two largest project funders are the Research Council of Norway and the Norwegian Ministry of Foreign Affairs. Other funders include the European Union, the World Bank, and the Norwegian Ministry of Defence. In 2009, PRIO initiated the founding of the US based Peace Research Endowment.

In Oslo, PRIO hosted the Norwegian Initiative on Small Arms Transfers, which was shut down in 2017 due to lack of funding. This was a joint initiative of PRIO, the Norwegian Red Cross and the Norwegian Church Aid to help block the spread of small arms to areas where they are likely to be used in warfare, armed violence or human rights abuses.

The staff comprises a core group of 40-50 full-time researchers and support staff. In addition, there are researchers with a part-time affiliation with PRIO, visiting scholars, interns and students.

=== Research centres ===
Centre for the Study of Civil War

From 2003 to 2012, PRIO hosted the Centre for the Study of Civil War, one of the original 13 "Centres of Excellence" in Norway. The director for the full 10-year period was Scott Gates.

Cyprus Centre

The institute maintains a centre in Nicosia, Cyprus, known as the PRIO Cyprus Centre. Through its network, projects and dialogue forums, the PRIO Cyprus Centre aims to foster cooperation between Greek and Turkish Cypriots, and strengthen regional cooperation in the Eastern Mediterranean at large.

Centre on Gender, Peace and Security

In 2015, PRIO established their Centre on Gender, Peace and Security, which is engaged in research in gender and conflict studies. In particular, the centre studies issues like sexual violence in conflict situations, women's representation in mediation and post-conflict settlements, and gender security.

== Journals ==
PRIO owns two academic journals, both edited at the institute and published by SAGE Publications: Journal of Peace Research, edited by Scott Gates, and Security Dialogue, edited by Mark B. Salter.

== Education ==
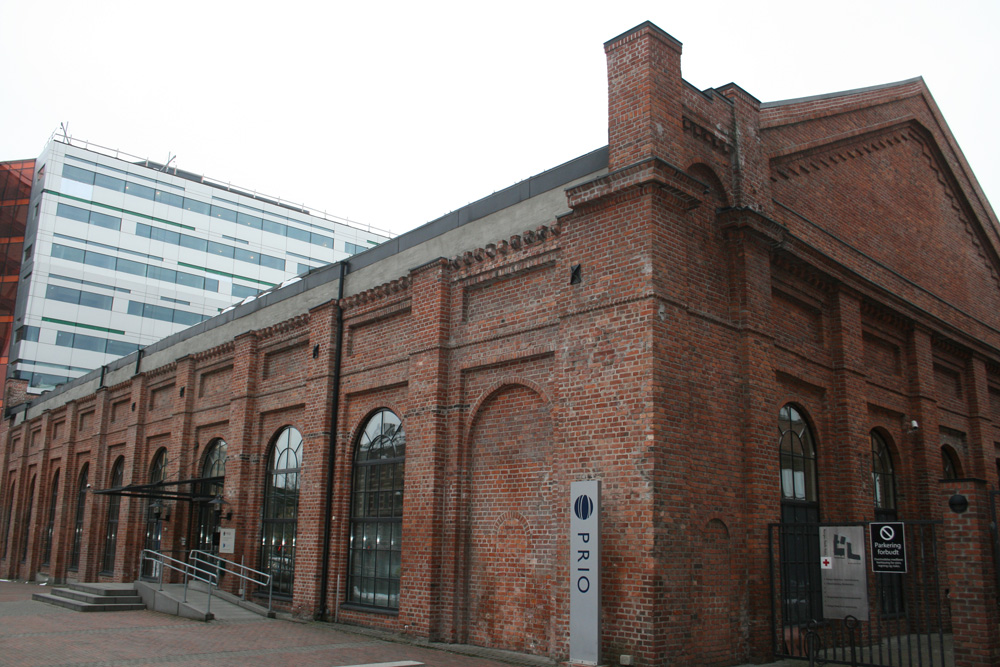
PRIO building in Hausmanns gate

PRIO provides a limited number of education services. The Research School on Peace and Conflict has been a multidisciplinary training center, where a number of courses are taught by visiting scholars. Partner institutions include the University of Oslo and the Norwegian University of Science and Technology. Until 2020 this was a Research School funded Research School which took up members and focused on courses concentrating on academic writing, research methodology and topical issues. Since 2020 PRIO has offered PhD level courses on an individual basis and ceased accepting members.

Until 2013, PRIO and Bjørknes College provided joint master's degree programs with Australian National University and the University of Stellenbosch in international political economy and conflict dynamics, as well as peace and conflict studies.

== PRIO Annual Peace Address ==
Initiated in 2010, the PRIO Annual Peace Address intends to create awareness, stir public debate and increase understanding about the conditions for peace in the world. Inviting researchers and other people with strong views on peace-related topics, the idea is to challenge the peace research community by suggesting new measures and bringing new perspectives on peace and war.

- 2010: Jon Elster: Justice, Truth, Peace
- 2011: John Lewis: The Role of Nonviolence in the Struggle for Liberation
- 2012: Azar Gat: Peace for Our Time?
- 2013: Jody Williams: The Power of Global Activism
- 2014: Paul Collier: Civil Conflict: What are the Current Risks, and What are the Realistic Solutions?
- 2015: John Mueller: The Dangers of Alarmism
- 2016: Francesca Borri: The Journalistic Contribution to Peace
- 2017: Obiageli Ezekwesili: Education and Peace
- 2018: Debarati Guha-Sapir: The Epidemiology of Armed Conflicts
- 2019: Steven Pinker: Enlightenment Now!

== See also ==
- PRIO Director's Shortlist
