= Financial cost of the Iraq War =

The cost of the Iraq War following the 2003 invasion of Iraq is often contested, as academics and critics have noted many expenditures not represented in official estimates. There were also some recissions of funds in the 2010s.

The following is a partial accounting of financial costs of the Iraq War by the United States and the United Kingdom, the two largest non-Iraqi participants of the multinational force in Iraq.

== US war costs ==
=== Direct costs ===
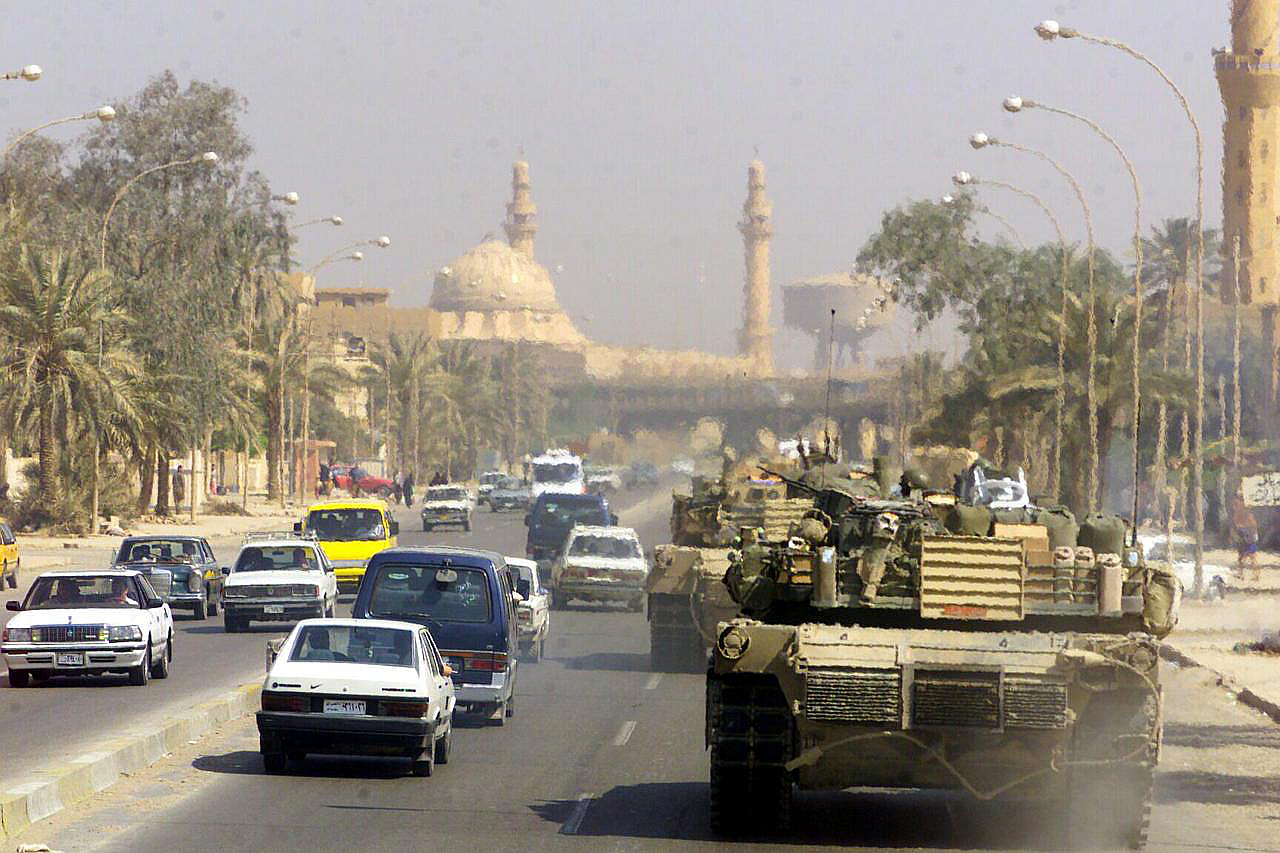
A Marine Corps M1 Abrams tank patrols a Baghdad street after its fall in 2003 during Operation Iraqi Freedom.

A major report of direct costs was prepared by the Watson Center at Brown University, totalling over $1.1 trillion. As of August 2017, the United States Department of Defense's direct spending on Iraq, Afghanistan, and Syria since September 11, 2001 totaled at least $1.474 trillion, and highlights the complementary costs at home, such as interest paid on the funds borrowed to finance the wars.

Those figures are dramatically higher than typical estimates published just prior to the start of the Iraq War, most of which were based on a shorter term of involvement. For example, in a March 16, 2003 Meet the Press interview of Vice President Dick Cheney, held less than a week before the Iraq War began, host Tim Russert reported that "every analysis said this war itself would cost about $80 billion, recovery of Baghdad, perhaps of Iraq, about $10 billion per year. We should expect as American citizens that this would cost at least $100 billion for a two-year involvement."

==== Appropriations ====
- FY2003 Supplemental: Operation Iraqi Freedom: Passed April 2003; Total $78.5 billion, $54.4 billion Iraq War
- FY2004 Supplemental: Iraq and Afghanistan Ongoing invasion reconstruction: Passed November 2003; Total $87.5 billion, $70.5 billion Iraq War
- FY2004 DoD Budget Amendment: $25 billion Emergency Reserve Fund (Iraq Freedom Fund): Passed July 2004, Total $25 billion, $21.5 billion (estimated) Iraq War
- FY2005 Emergency Supplemental: Operations in the War on Terror; Activities in Afghanistan; Tsunami Relief: Passed April 2005, Total $82 billion, $58 billion (estimated) Iraq War
- FY2006 Department of Defense appropriations: Total $50 billion, $40 billion (estimated) Iraq War.
- FY2006 Emergency Supplemental: Operations Global War on Terror; Activities in Iraq & Afghanistan: Passed February 2006, Total $72.4 billion, $60 billion (estimated) Iraq War
- FY2007 Department of Defense appropriations: $70 billion (estimated) for Iraq War-related costs
- FY2007 Emergency Supplemental (proposed) $100 billion
- FY2008 Bush administration proposed around $190 billion for the Iraq War and Afghanistan
- FY2009 Obama administration proposed around $130 billion in additional funding for the Iraq War and Afghanistan.
- FY2010 Obama administration proposes around $159.3 billion for the Iraq and Afghanistan wars.

=== Indirect and delayed costs ===
According to a Congressional Budget Office (CBO) report published in October 2007, the US wars in Iraq and Afghanistan could cost taxpayers a total of $2.4 trillion by 2017 including interest. The CBO estimated that of the $2.4 trillion long-term price tag for the war, about $1.9 trillion of that would be spent on Iraq, or $6,300 per US citizen.

A Congressional Research Service (CRS) report (conducted after the 2010 end of combat operations and 2011 withdrawal) was released in December 2014. It placed the cost of the war operations in Iraq as of January 1, 2014, at $815 billion out of the total $1.6 trillion approved by Congress since September 2001.

Joseph Stiglitz, former chief economist of the World Bank and winner of the Nobel Prize in Economics, and Linda Bilmes, a Harvard University professor and former official at the U.S. Department of Commerce, forecast that the total cost of the Iraq War to the United States will be three trillion dollars in a moderate scenario, described in their book about the budgetary and economic costs of the war The Three Trillion Dollar War and possibly more in a study published in March 2008. Stiglitz has stated: "The figure we arrive at is more than $3 trillion. Our calculations are based on conservative assumptions...Needless to say, this number represents the cost only to the United States. It does not reflect the enormous cost to the rest of the world, or to Iraq."

A 2013 updated study pointed out that US medical and disability claims for veterans after a decade of war had risen to $134.7 billion from $33 billion two years earlier.

The extended combat and equipment loss have placed a severe financial strain on the US Army, causing the elimination of non-essential expenses such as travel and civilian hiring.

In 2020, Neta Crawford, chair of the political science department at Boston University, in her Costs of War Project, estimated the long term cost of the Iraq War for the United States at $1.922 trillion. This figure includes not only funding appropriated to the Pentagon explicitly for the war, but spending on Iraq by the State Department, the healthcare of Iraq War veterans, and the interest expense on debt incurred to fund 17 years of U.S. military involvement in the country.

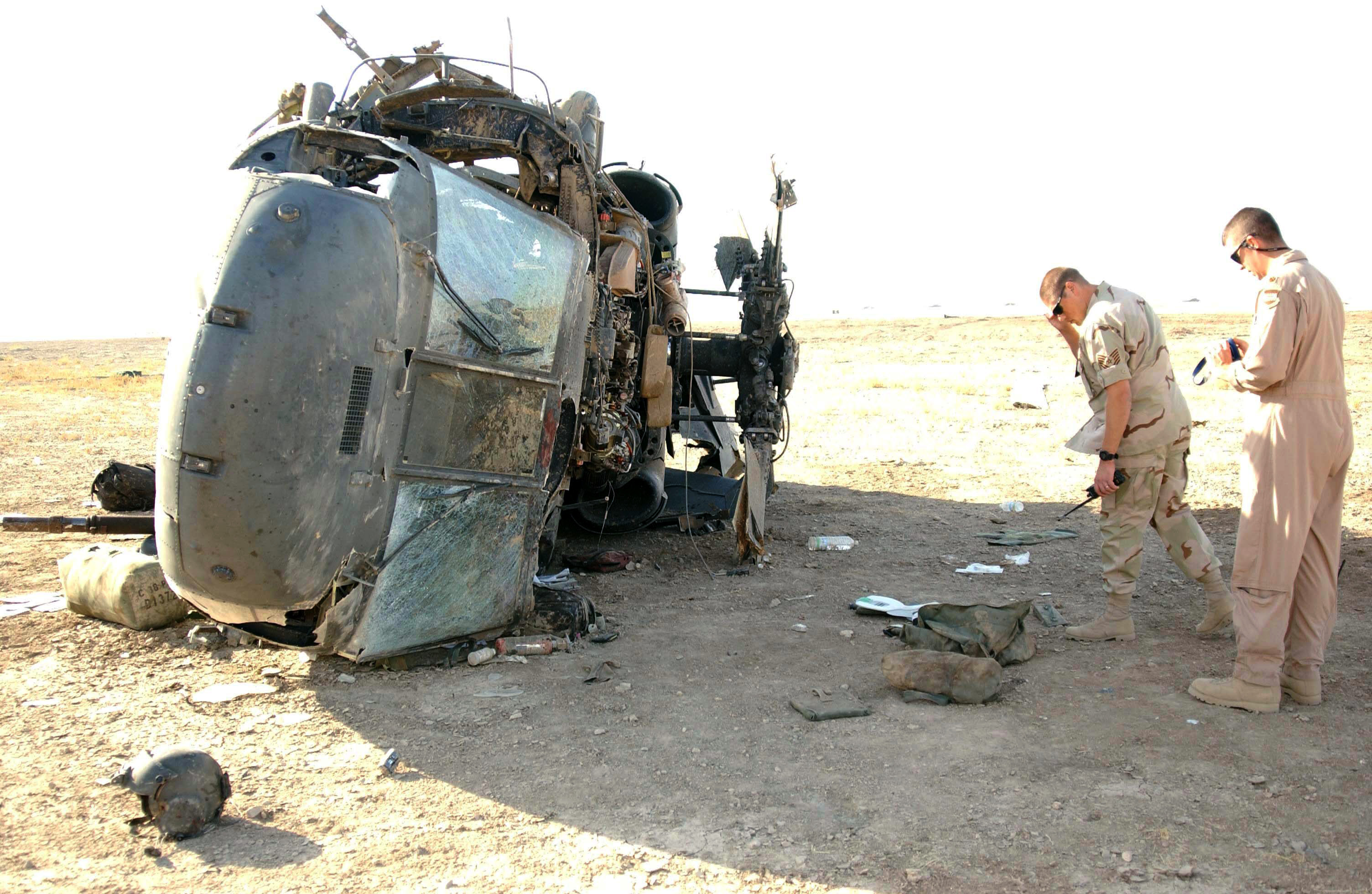
The UH-60 Black Hawk that crashed on September 21, 2004

=== Military equipment ===
The US expended a significant investment in military equipment during the war. The following data are from the Center for American Progress, including vehicles lost in non-combat-related accidents as of 2006; and are only approximations.

==== 2006 land equipment ====
- 20 M1 Abrams tanks
- 50 M2 Bradley fighting vehicles
- 20 Stryker wheeled combat vehicles
- 20 M113 armored personnel carriers
- 250 Humvees
- 500+ mine clearing vehicles, heavy/medium trucks, and trailers
- 10 Assault amphibious vehicles

==== 2006 air equipment ====
- 109 helicopters
- 18 fixed-wing aircraft

In June 2006, the Army said that the cost of replacing its depleted equipment tripled from that of 2005. As of December 2006, according to government data reported by The Washington Post, the military stated that nearly 40% of the army's total equipment has been sent to Iraq, with an estimated yearly refurbishment cost of $US 17 billion. The military states that the yearly refurbishment cost has increased by a factor of ten compared to that of the pre-war state. As of December 2006 approximately 500 M1 tanks, 700 Bradley Fighting Vehicles and 1000 Humvees were awaiting repair in US military depots.

In September 2007, the Congressional Budget Office produced a report outlining the Army's Reset Program and included some combat loss numbers.

==== 2007 land equipment approximation ====
- 20 M1 Abrams tanks
- 50–75 M2 Bradley fighting vehicles
- 20–40 Stryker wheeled combat vehicles
- 20 M113 armored personnel carriers
- 461–800 Humvees (min, max based on 24k HMMWV and 15k trucks in theater, and 750–1300 losses)
- 288–500 Trucks (min, max based on 24k HMMWV and 15k trucks in theater, and 750–1300 losses)

== UK war costs ==
As of March 2006, approximately £4.5 billion ($6.8 billion) had been spent by the United Kingdom in Iraq. This came from a government fund called the "Special Reserve" which at the time had a balance of £7.4 billion ($10.14 billion). According to the Ministry of Defence, the total cost of UK military operations in Iraq from 2003 to 2009 was £8.4bn.

Official calculations stated that the Iraq and Afghanistan wars combined cost £20.3 billion (up to but not beyond June 2010).

== See also ==
- Australian contribution to the 2003 invasion of Iraq
- Casualties of the Iraq War
- Polish involvement in the 2003 invasion of Iraq
- Refugees of Iraq
