= Costs of War Project =

American anti-war research project

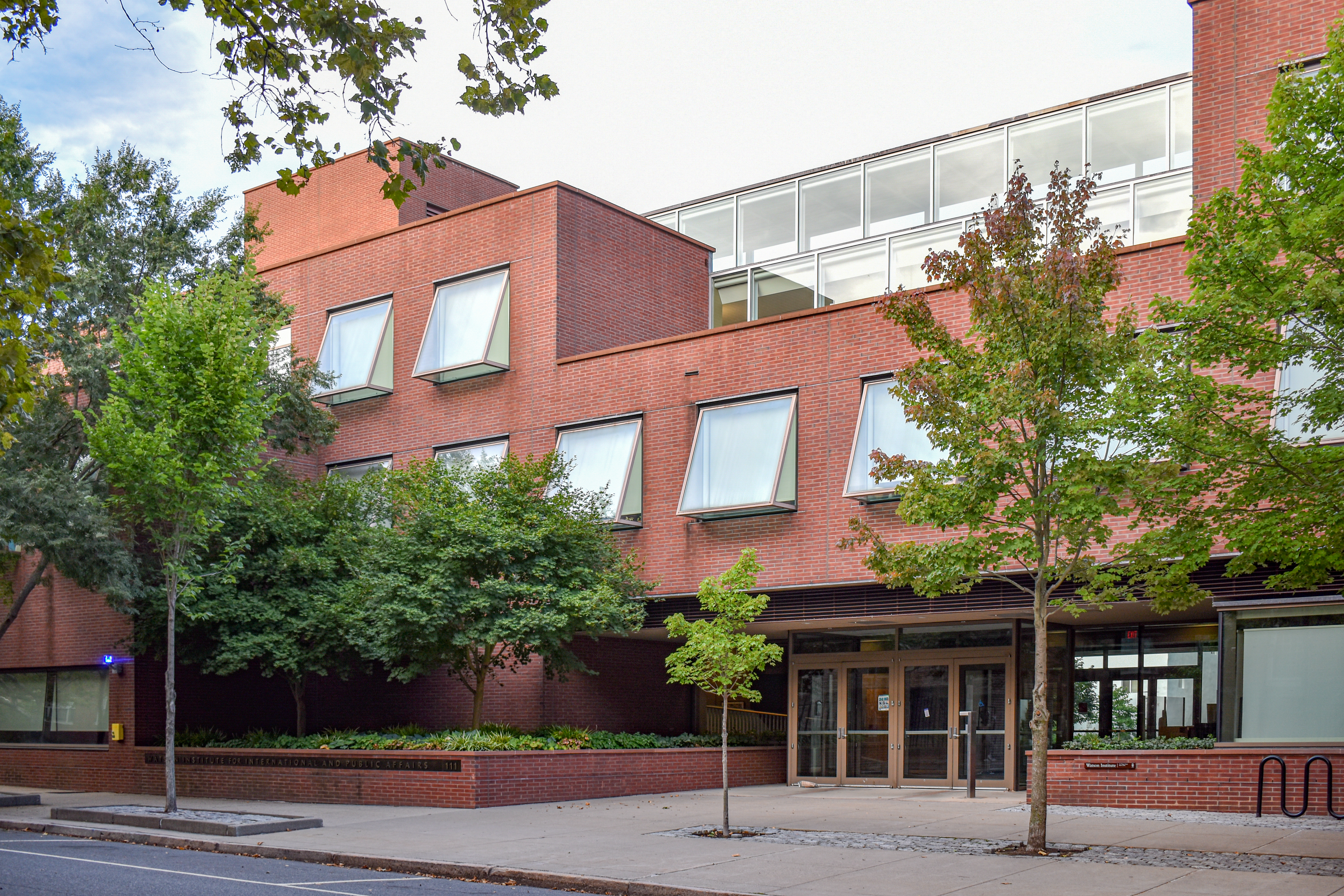
The Costs of War Project is housed at the Watson Institute for International and Public Affairs at Brown University.

The Costs of War Project is a nonpartisan research project based at the Watson Institute for International and Public Affairs at Brown University that seeks to document the direct and indirect human and financial costs of U.S. wars in Iraq and Afghanistan and related counterterrorism efforts. The project is the most extensive and comprehensive public accounting of the cost of post-9/11 U.S. military operations compiled to date.

The project involves economists, anthropologists, lawyers, humanitarians, and political scientists. It is directed by Catherine Lutz and Stephanie Savell of Brown University and Neta Crawford of Boston University.

== History ==
The Costs of War Project was established in 2010 by professor of anthropology and international studies at Brown University, Catherine Lutz, and Chair of Political Science at Boston University, Neta Crawford.

The project released its first findings in June 2011 and has published continuously since. It is financially supported by the Carnegie Corporation of New York, Colombe Peace Foundation, and Open Society Foundations.

Between 2016 and 2018, U.S. president Donald Trump repeatedly cited the expected total costs of the war on terror through 2050 as calculated by the project, though misrepresented the amount as cumulative spending rather than cumulative and potential future spending. On August 31, 2021, the project's figures for the financial cost of the War in Afghanistan were cited by U.S. President Joe Biden in a speech defending the withdrawal of U.S. troops from the nation.

Costs of War was the 2022 recipient of The US Peace Prize "For crucial research to shed light on the human, environmental, economic, social, and political costs of U.S. wars."

=== Contributors ===
Contributors to the project include Steven Aftergood, Nadje Al-Ali, Andrew Bacevich, Catherine L. Besteman, Linda Bilmes, Cynthia Enloe, Lisa Graves, Hugh Gusterson, William D. Hartung, James Heintz, Dahr Jamail, Jessica Stern, and Winslow T. Wheeler.

== Human, Monetary Cost ==
In their most recent report, the Costs of War Project estimates that post-9/11 wars participated in by the US have directly killed 905,000 to 940,000 people, and indirectly 3.6 million to 3.8 million, for a total of 4.5M-4.7M people. The Costs of War Project defined post-9/11 war zones as conflicts that included significant United States counter-terrorism operations since 9/11, which in addition to the wars in Iraq, Afghanistan and Pakistan, also includes the civil wars in Syria, Yemen, Libya and Somalia. They derived their estimate of indirect deaths using a calculation from the Geneva Declaration of Secretariat which estimates that for every person directly killed by war, four more die from the indirect consequences of war. The report's author Stephanie Savell stated that in an ideal scenario, the preferable way of quantifying the total death toll would have been by studying excess mortality, or by using on-the-ground researchers in the affected countries.

In addition, the Costs of War Project estimate that 38,000,000 were displaced in these wars. They also estimate that the cost to the US exceeded $8 trillion, including $2.2 trillion reserved for veterans' care through 2050.

A 2021 report from the project concluded that since September 11, 2001, four times more U.S. veterans and service members had died by suicide than had been killed in combat.

=== Scope ===
In its scope, the project accounts for factors that official estimates often exclude, including interest expenses, medical care for veterans, and spending by departments other than the Department of Defense. The study does not include U.S. assistance for operations against ISIS affiliates in the Philippines, Africa or Europe. In 2018, the project revised its focus to include Africa, accounting for U.S. operations and drone strikes in Libya and the Horn of Africa.

== See also ==
- Financial cost of the Iraq War
- Casualties of the Iraq War
- Cost of conflict
