= Neta Crawford =

American political scientist

Neta Crawford FBA
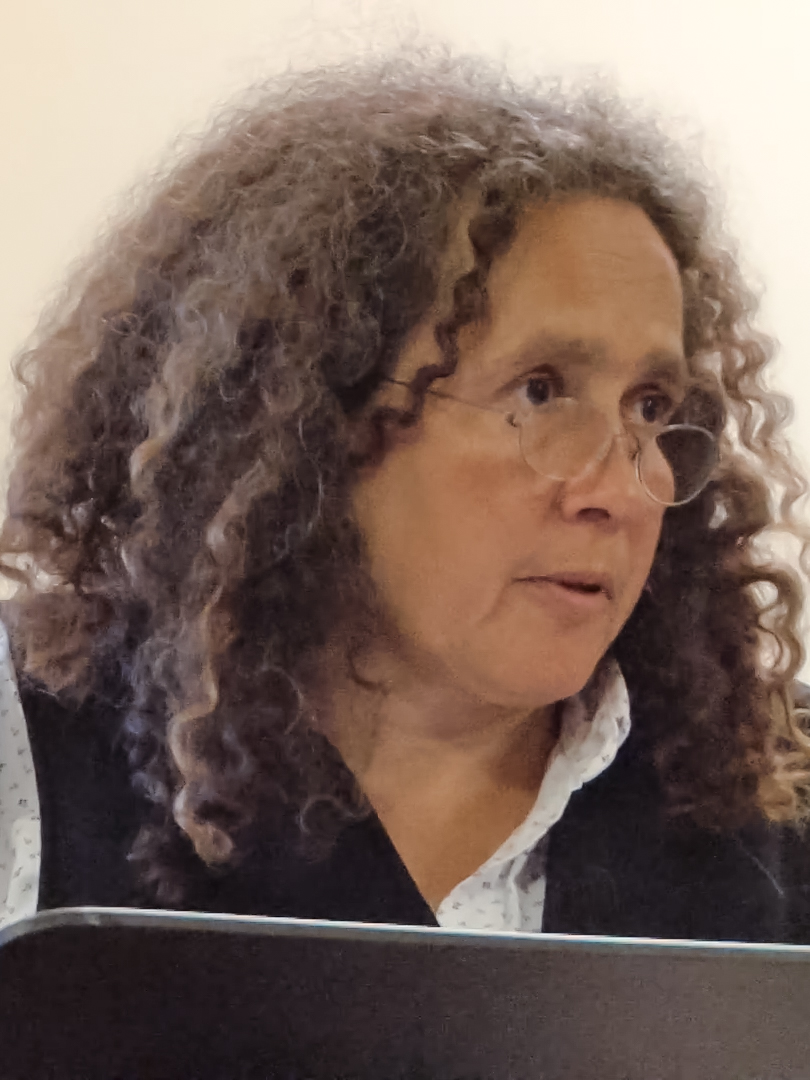
- Born: 1961 (age 64–65)

Academic background
- Education: Brown University; MIT

Academic work
- Institutions: Brown University; Boston University; University of Oxford

Neta C. Crawford FBA (/niːtə/ NEE-tuh; born 1961) is an American political scientist. She is Montague Burton Chair in International Relations at the University of Oxford and holds a Professorial Fellowship at Balliol College. Crawford previously served as professor and chair of the Department of Political Science at the Boston University College of Arts and Sciences in Boston, Massachusetts.

Crawford co-founded the Costs of War Project with anthropologist Catherine Lutz in 2010 and currently serves alongside Lutz and Stephanie Savell as a project co-director.

== Education and career ==
Crawford received her Bachelor of Arts from Brown University in 1985, where she pursued an independent concentration entitled "The War System and Alternatives to Militarism." She earned her doctorate in political science from the Massachusetts Institute of Technology, graduating in 1992. From 1994 to 1996, Crawford completed a post-doctoral fellowship at Brown's Watson Institute for International and Public Affairs. After teaching at the University of Massachusetts, Amherst, she returned to Brown as an associate and later adjunct professor. In 2005, she was appointed Professor of Political Science at Boston University.

In 2010, Crawford co-founded the Costs of War Project with the goal of documenting the direct and indirect human and financial costs of the war on terror. The project released its first findings in June 2011 and has published continuously since. The project is the most extensive and comprehensive public accounting of the cost of post-September 11th U.S. military operations compiled to date.

Since October 2017, Crawford has served on the board of the nuclear non-proliferation advocacy organization, Council for a Livable World. She serves on the editorial boards of The Journal of Political Philosophy and Global Perspectives.

In 2021, Crawford was appointed Montague Burton Professor of International Relations at the University of Oxford. She was elected a Fellow of the British Academy in 2023.

== Personal life ==
Crawford is black and Native American. She is a lesbian.

== Books ==
- The Pentagon, Climate Change, and War: Charting the Rise and Fall of U.S. Military Emissions, MIT Press (published 2022), October 2022, ISBN 9780262047487
- Accountability for Killing: Moral Responsibility for Collateral Damage in America's Post-9/11 Wars, Oxford University Press (published 2013), October 2013, ISBN 9780199981724
- Argument and Change in World Politics Ethics, Decolonization, and Humanitarian Intervention, Cambridge University Press (published 2002), 25 July 2002, ISBN 9780521002790
- Crawford, Neta; Klotz, Audie, eds. (29 January 1999), How Sanctions Work: Lessons from South Africa, International Political Economy Series, Palgrave Macmillan (published 1999), ISBN 978-0-333-72551-1
- Soviet Military Aircraft, Institute for Defense and Disarmament Studies, 1987, ISBN 9780669148879
