= John Friedman =

American economist

John N. Friedman
- Spouse: Hilary Friedman

Academic background
- Education: Harvard University (AB, AM, PhD)
- Academic advisors: Andrei Shleifer, Edward Glaeser, David Laibson, Alberto Alesina, David Cutler

Academic work
- Discipline: Economics
- Institutions: Brown University

John N. Friedman is an economist who currently serves as Professor of Economics, Chair of Economics, and Professor of International and Public Affairs at Brown University. He additionally co-directs Opportunity Insights and is a Research Associate of the National Bureau of Economic Research. Since July 1, 2025, Friedman has been the inaugural dean of the Thomas J. Watson Jr. School of International and Public Affairs at Brown University.

== Early life and education ==
Friedman was born to Barbara and Benjamin Friedman; his father is also an economist, on the faculty of Harvard University. John Friedman attended Harvard, graduating summa cum laude with a bachelor's degree in economics in 2002. He received his master's in statistics the same year. In 2007, Friedman received his PhD in economics from Harvard. At Harvard, Friedman overlapped with his future collaborator Raj Chetty.

== Career ==
His research interests include public economics and political economy. Friedman was previously an assistant professor of public policy at Harvard Kennedy School at Harvard University and served as a Special Assistant to President Obama for Economic Policy on the White House's National Economic Council in 2013–2014. He became editor-in-chief of the Journal of Public Economics in 2019. In 2018, Friedman co-founded Opportunity Insights, an economics-focused think tank, with Raj Chetty and Nathaniel Hendren.

During the COVID-19 pandemic, Friedman co-led a group that developed an economic tracker, the Opportunity Insights Economic Tracker. This presented private-sector data on economic trends more frequently and more rapidly than officially published economic statistics.

== Personal life ==
Friedman is married to Hilary Levey Friedman, a visiting assistant professor of education at Brown. The couple met in the fall of 2002 while they were completing fellowships at the University of Cambridge and married in 2010. They have two sons.
