= Opportunity Insights =

American-based think tank

- Formation: October 1, 2018; 7 years ago
- Headquarters: Cambridge, Massachusetts
- Key people: Raj Chetty (Director); John Friedman (Co-Director); Nathaniel Hendren (Co-Director)
- Website: https://opportunityinsights.org/

Opportunity Insights is an American think tank and policy research institute based at Harvard University. The organization's research focuses on the economics of opportunity and social mobility.

== History ==
Opportunity Insights was founded in 2018 by Raj Chetty and Nathaniel Hendren, economists at Harvard University, and John Friedman, an economist at Brown University. The group was formed out of the "Equality of Opportunity Project," Chetty's previous policy research group.

Chetty formed the think tank shortly after he returned to Harvard following a three-year stint at Stanford University. Opportunity Insights received $3 million from John Overdeck's Overdeck Family Foundation and support from the Bill and Melinda Gates Foundation and the Chan Zuckerberg Initiative.

== Research ==
During the COVID-19 pandemic, researchers at Opportunity Insights launched the Opportunity Insights Economic tracker to measure and report economic metrics at the county and local level and the impact of the pandemic on local economies. Further research also found that reduced spending from wealthier Americans paired with increased spending from poorer Americans could stunt the country's pandemic economic recovery.

In August 2022, a study led by Chetty found that friendships across socioeconomic status can be a contributor to reducing poverty. The work built on Opportunity Insights research focused on the influence of the neighborhood a person grows up in on their longterm socioeconomic trajectory. James Heckman and Sadegh Esaghnia have questioned the group's research methodology, arguing that the influence of a family's choices is a stronger indicator than the neighborhood where the family lives.

In a study in July 2024, Opportunity Insights researchers found that the influence of race on social mobility had been shrinking while the influence of class had been growing.

=== SAT and college admissions ===
In 2023, an Opportunity Insights study based on federal tax and college records found that wealthier students were considerably likelier to gain admission to "Ivy Plus" universities, consisting of the Ivy League, Massachusetts Institute of Technology, Stanford University, Duke University, and the University of Chicago. The study also found that legacy applicants are also 33 percent likelier to be admitted to elite schools even without consideration of their legacy status.

The same study also found a strong correlation between a student's standardized test scores and their future success. After the publication of the Opportunity Insights study, several elite institutions that had stopped requiring standardized test scores for admission returned to mandating them.
