= Edward Steinfeld =

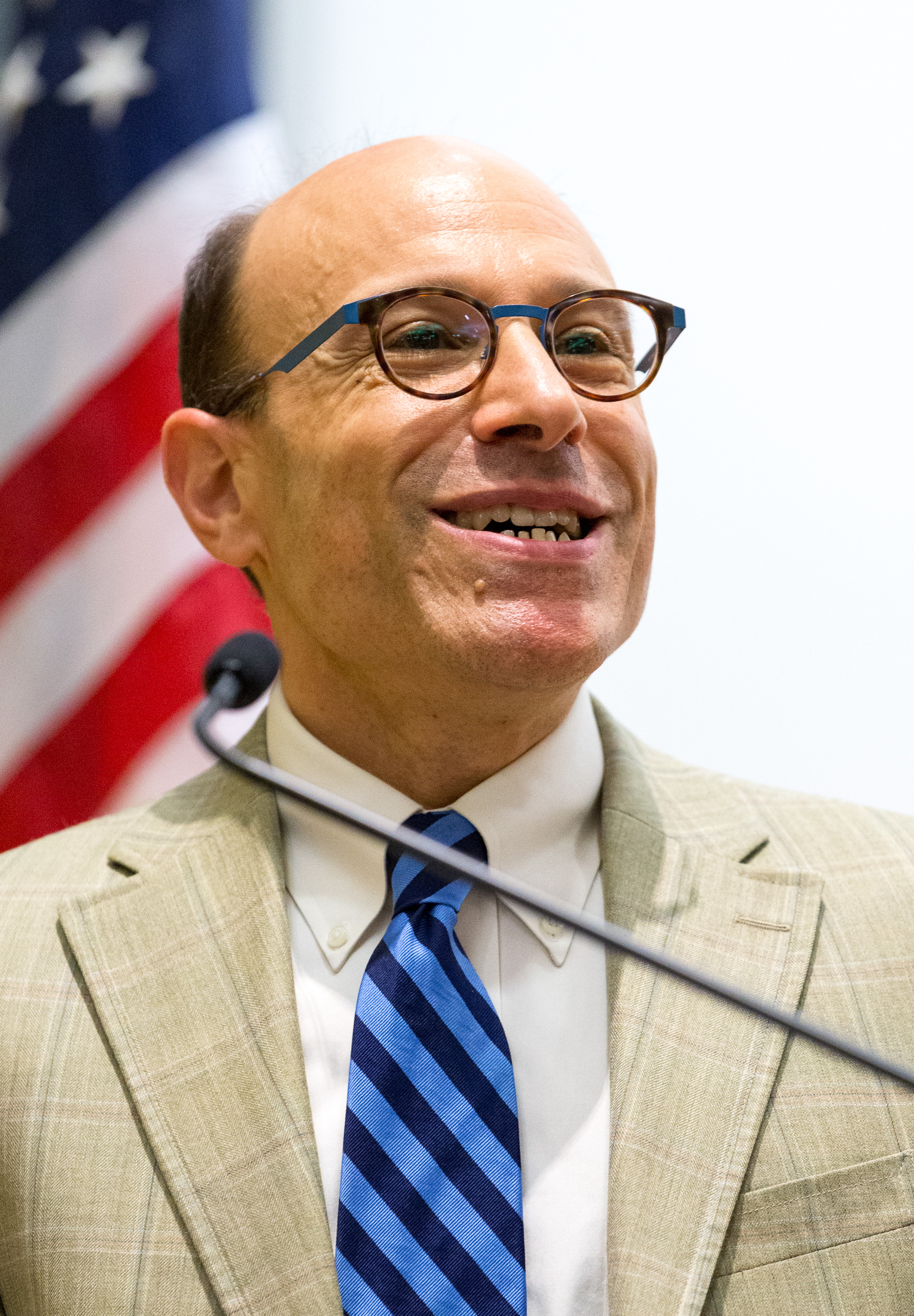

Academic background
- Education: Harvard University (BA, MA, PhD)

Edward Saul Steinfeld (born 1966, Chinese: 谢德华) is a political scientist and academic specializing in contemporary Chinese politics. He is Professor of Political Science at Brown University. From 2015 to 2024 he was Director of the Watson Institute for International and Public Affairs. Steinfeld moved to Brown in 2013, having previously taught at the Massachusetts Institute of Technology.

Steinfeld received a BA, MA, and PhD from Harvard University. He currently serves on the board of directors of the National Committee on United States–China Relations.

In 2015, Steinfeld was appointed the Howard R. Swearer Director of Brown University's Watson Institute for International and Public Affairs. He was reappointed in December 2020.

== Books ==
- Playing Our Game: Why China's Rise Doesn't Threaten the West, Oxford University Press, 2010, ISBN 9780195390650
- Huang, Yasheng; Saich, Tony; Steinfeld, Edward, eds. (1998), Financial Sector Reform in China, Brill Publishers, ISBN 9781684171224
- Forging Reform in China: The Fate of State Industry, Cambridge University Press, 1998, ISBN 9780521778619
