= Linda Bilmes =

American economist and academic

Linda J. Bilmes
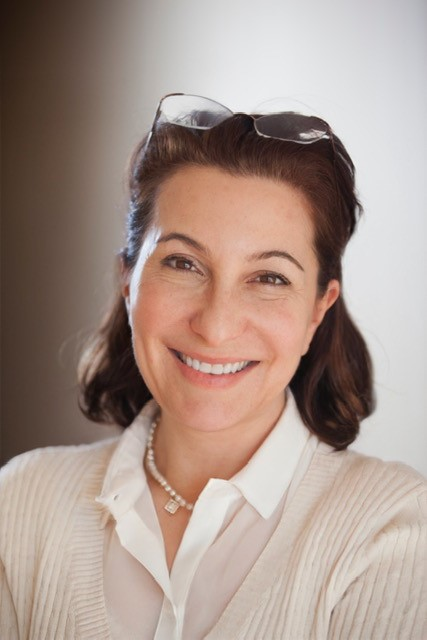

Former Assistant Secretary and CFO of U.S. Department of Commerce
- In office 1999–2001
- President: Bill Clinton

Personal details
- Born: 1960 (age 65–66)
- Education: Harvard University; Harvard Business School, University of Oxford

Linda J. Bilmes (born 1960) is an American public policy expert who is the Daniel Patrick Moynihan Senior Lecturer Chair in Public Policy and Public Finance at Harvard University. She is a faculty member at the Harvard Kennedy School where she teaches public policy, budgeting and public finance. She served as Assistant Secretary and Chief Financial Officer of the US Department of Commerce during the presidency of Bill Clinton.

Bilmes is credited with drawing attention to the cost of the Iraq War and to the long-term cost of caring for returning Iraq and Afghanistan war veterans. She is internationally recognized for coining the term "Ghost Budget" to describe the hidden, off-ledger mechanisms through which the United States has financed its post-9/11 wars. She is a contributor to the Brown University Watson Institute's Costs of War Project. She has testified to the US Congress regarding the costs of the Iraq and Afghanistan wars and the long-term consequences for providing veterans care several times. She is the recipient of the 2008 “Speaking Truth to Power” Award from the American Friends Service Committee. In 2017, she was nominated by UN Secretary General Antonio Guterres to serve a four-year term as one of 24 experts on the UN Committee of Experts on Public Administration and re-appointed to a second term from 2021 to 2025. She co-authored the centennial study of the economic value of the US National Parks System, which established a baseline value of $92 billion for the parks and programs and co-authored a book on the economic value of national parks.

Bilmes is a faculty affiliate of the Mossavar-Rahmani Center for Business and Government, the Taubman Center for State and Local Government, the Belfer Center for Science and International Affairs (board member), the Rappaport Institute for Greater Boston, the Bloomberg Harvard City Leadership Initiative and the Kennedy School Center for Public Leadership. At Harvard, Bilmes founded and directs the Rappaport Greater Boston Advanced Applied Field Lab, a clinical program in which teams of students work in local communities on budgeting and financial challenges. She leads budgeting workshops and training sessions for newly elected Mayors and Members of Congress run by the Harvard Institute of Politics. Bilmes also teaches and conducts research at the Blavatnik School of Government at Oxford University, where she was a visiting fellow at Brasenose College. She is a member of the Council on Foreign Relations and a Fellow of the National Academy of Public Administration. She is Chair of Economists for Peace and Security and serves on the board of the Institute for Veterans and Military Families.

== Early life and education ==
Bilmes was born in New York and raised in San Mateo, California, the daughter of Lila Yolanda Lynn and Murray Bilmes. Her adoptive stepfather is Myron Nye Humphrey. She was given the middle name "Jan" after her godmother, singer Jan DeGaetani. She attended public schools including Aragon High School. During her senior year, she worked as an intern for Governor Jerry Brown during his first term as Governor of California. Bilmes holds an AB degree in government from Harvard University, a master's of business administration degree from Harvard Business School and a doctor of philosophy degree from the University of Oxford. She wrote her dissertation on the financing of the Afghanistan and Iraq wars. In commentary on peace and higher education, Bilmes has been described as a member of the Society of Friends (Quakers).

In her early career, Bilmes worked as a pollster and political consultant for Campaign Strategies Inc. and then as a management consultant with Bain & Company until 1986. From 1987 to 1996, she worked at management consulting company The Boston Consulting Group based in London, Madrid and Moscow. As a principal at The Boston Consulting Group, Bilmes helped build the company's United Kingdom healthcare practice, launch its Madrid office, and was appointed as one of 10 Western advisors to the Russian Ministry of Privatization, where she helped to draft Russia's transitional healthcare financing legislation, and managed public financial restructuring projects throughout Europe.

== Government career ==
Bilmes has held senior positions in the US government including US Assistant Secretary for Administration, Management and Budget and CFO of the United States Department of Commerce. Prior to joining the Harvard faculty, Bilmes served in government during the presidency of Bill Clinton. She was confirmed twice by the U.S. Senate, first as Assistant Secretary for Administration and Budget, and additionally as Chief Financial Officer, of the United States Department of Commerce, from 1998 to 2001. She previously served as Deputy Assistant Secretary of Commerce for Administration from 1997 to 1998. She has been appointed to several high-ranking commissions, including a Treasury Department commission to examine the viability of the Inter-American Investment Corporation. From 2009 to 2011 She served as a commissioner on the bipartisan National Parks Second Century Commission. During the Obama administration she served from 2011 to 2017 on the U.S. Department of Interior National Parks System Advisory Board and on the US Department of Labor Advisory Board on Veterans Employment and Training.

== Books and publications ==
Bilmes is the author of several important books, book chapters and academic papers. She is co-author, with Nobel laureate Joseph Stiglitz, of The Three Trillion Dollar War, which became a New York Times and international best-seller. She is co-author of The People Factor: Strengthening America by Investing in Public Service with W. Scott Gould and Gebt un das Risiko Zuruck with Peter Strueven and Konrad Wetzker. She is co-author with John Loomis of Valuing U.S.Parks and Programs: America's Best investment.

=== Articles ===
- Bilmes, Linda J. (January 2007). Soldiers returning from Iraq and Afghanistan: the long-term costs of providing veterans medical care and disability benefits. HKS Faculty Research Working Paper Series. RWP07-001. Pdf.
- Bilmes, Linda J.; Stiglitz, Joseph E. (January 2009). "Report: the $10 trillion hangover: paying the price for eight years of Bush". Harper's Magazine. 318 (1904). Non-subscription version.
- Bilmes, Linda J. (March 2013). The financial legacy of Iraq and Afghanistan: how wartime spending decisions will constrain future national security budgets. HKS Faculty Research Working Paper Series. RWP13-006. Pdf.
- Bilmes, Linda; Intriligator, Michael D. (May 2013). "How many wars is the US fighting today?". Peace Economics, Peace Science, and Public Policy. 19 (1): 8–16. doi:10.1515/peps-2013-0011.

== Personal life ==
Bilmes is married to Jonathan R. Hakim. They have three sons.
