= Making Refuge =

Non-fiction book written in 2016

Making Refuge: Somali Bantu Refugees and Lewiston, Maine
- The book's cover
- Author: Catherine L. Besteman
- Language: English
- Series: Global Insecurities
- Subject: Somali Bantu
- Genre: Non-fiction
- Publisher: Duke University Press Books
- Publication date: 2016
- Publication place: United States
- Media type: Print, e-book
- Pages: 352 pages (first edition hardcover)
- ISBN: 0822360276

Making Refuge: Somali Bantu Refugees and Lewiston, Maine is a 2016 non-fiction book by Catherine L. Besteman, the Francis F. Bartlett and Ruth K. Bartlett Professor of Anthropology at Colby College in Waterville, Maine.

== Background ==
While working on field research for her doctoral dissertation Besteman was in regular contact with people living in a Somali farming village in the Jubba Valley, but lost contact due to civil war and unrest in the country once she returned home. Some Somali Bantu fled the country and resided in refugee camps in Kenya for over a decade. Upon discovering that some of the Bantu valley community had resettled in Lewiston, Maine after leaving the refugee camps, Besteman chose to write Making Refuge in order to provide a platform for them to discuss their journey of becoming resettled refugees along with their struggles to find work and getting an education in a new country where they were seen as a “burden” by some Americans.

== Synopsis ==
Making Refuge is separated into three parts which represent different phases of Bantu refugee's experience and including Bestemen's own engagement with those experiences. Bestemen pieces their movement from living south of the Jabba Valley, to living in refugee camps in Kenya for over a decade and resettling in Lewiston, Maine. Bestemen wanted to know how people had survived the civil war, losing everything that they had, enduring abuses and trauma all while attempting to rebuild their lives in a country where it is known for its individualism.

== Reception ==
Making Refuge has been reviewed in outlets and journals such as The Journal of Social Encounters and PoLAR, the latter of which stated that it was "an excellent book for prompting them to think about these issues and their broader, ongoing ramifications, many of which are closer to home than they may realize." Writing for Anthropological Quarterly, Cindy Horst noted that the book had several strengths such as Bestemen's prior interactions with the Bantu refugees and the different perspectives on their arrival in the United States.
