= Raj Chetty =

American economist

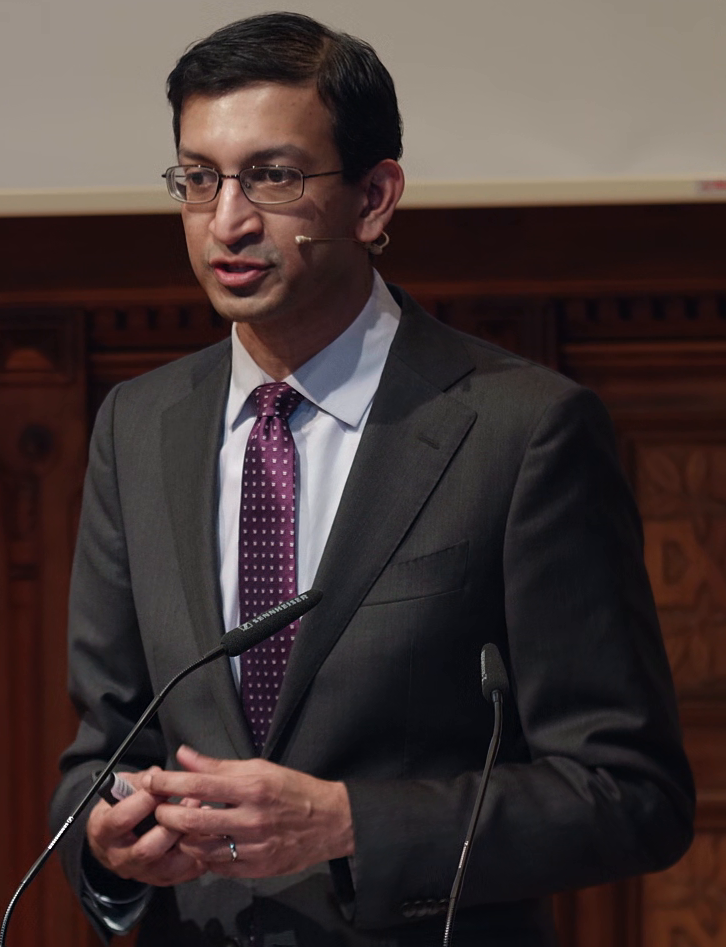
- Born: Nadarajan Chetty; August 4, 1979 (age 46); New Delhi, India

Academic background
- Education: Harvard University (BA, MA, PhD)
- Doctoral advisor: Martin Feldstein, Lawrence F. Katz

Academic work
- Discipline: Public economics
- Institutions: Stanford University; Harvard University; University of California, Berkeley
- Awards: MacArthur Fellowship (2012); John Bates Clark Medal (2013); Infosys Prize (2020)
- Website: www.rajchetty.com; Information at IDEAS / RePEc

Nadarajan "Raj" Chetty (born August 4, 1979) is an American economist who is the William A. Ackman Professor of Public Economics at Harvard University. Some of Chetty's recent papers have studied equality of opportunity in the United States and the long-term impact of teachers on students' performance. Chetty received tenure at Harvard's economics department at the age of 29, making him one of the youngest in the university's history. He is a recipient of the John Bates Clark Medal and a 2012 MacArthur Fellow. Currently, he is also an advisory editor of the Journal of Public Economics. In 2020, he was awarded the Infosys Prize in Economics.

== Education and early career ==
Raj Chetty was born in 1979 in New Delhi, India to a Tamil family, and lived there until the age of nine. His family immigrated to the United States in 1988. His mother, Rekha Chetty, became one of the first women in her South Indian community to become a physician. His father, V. Chetty, is an economist who worked as a researcher at the World Bank. Chetty graduated from University School of Milwaukee in 1997 and earned his AB from Harvard University in 2000. He continued at Harvard to earn his PhD in 2003, completing a dissertation under the direction of Martin Feldstein, Gary Chamberlain, and Lawrence F. Katz with a thesis titled Consumption commitments, risk preferences, and optimal unemployment insurance. As a sophomore in college, Chetty was told by his mentor Feldstein to pursue his own ideas after proposing a counterintuitive idea that higher interest rates sometimes lead to higher investment.

In 2003, at the age of 24, Chetty became an Assistant Professor of Economics at the University of California, Berkeley, becoming a tenured Associate Professor there at 28. In 2009, Chetty returned to Harvard, where he was the Bloomberg Professor of Economics and the director of the Lab for Economic Applications and Policy. In 2015, Chetty moved to Stanford, where he became a professor in the Economics Department. In June 2018, Raj Chetty's frequent coauthor John Friedman announced that Chetty would return to Harvard. In July of the same year, he became a Founding Director of Opportunity Insights with John Friedman and Nathaniel Hendren.

== Research ==
In 2011 with John Friedman and Jonah Rockoff, Chetty found that test-score based value-added measures are not substantially biased by unobserved student characteristics and that the students of high value-added teachers have markedly better outcomes later in life. Drawing on these findings, Chetty testified in the landmark case Vergara v. California in support of the plaintiffs’ key points: that teacher quality has a direct impact on students’ achievements and that the current dismissal and seniority statutes have disparate impact on minority and low-income students.

Chetty is also known for research showing that economic mobility varies enormously within the United States and for work on the optimal level of unemployment benefits.

Chetty's contribution to economic mobility started with his 2014 paper, "Where is the Land of Opportunity? The Geography of Intergenerational Mobility in the United States." In this paper, Chetty discussed the effects of geography on economic mobility. He used information from deidentified federal income tax records, which gave him records from 1996 to 2012. The research's main focus was on intergenerational mobility in the United States as a whole. Chetty used the parent's income between the years of 1996-2000 when the participants were between the ages of 15–20. Chetty concluded that 5 significant variables strongly correlated with intergenerational mobility. Those variables are residential segregation, income inequality, school quality, social capital, and family structure. The authors concluded that intergenerational mobility is primarily a local problem. Meaning that place-based policies are better fitting for each city. This allows for each city to be able to make a plan and policy that will best help the people in that city that is affected by the constrictions of intergenerational mobility.

In 2016, Chetty, Nathaniel Hendren, and Lawrence F. Katz published two influential studies revisiting the Moving to Opportunity (MTO) experiment using newly linked IRS data. By following children from the original MTO families into adulthood, the authors were able to measure long-term outcomes such as earnings, college attendance, and neighborhood choice with far more precision than earlier work.

Their research found that the age at which children moved had a major impact on results. Children who moved to low-poverty neighborhoods before age 13 experienced higher earnings as adults, were more likely to attend college, and were more likely to live in healthier, higher-opportunity areas as adults. Older children did not show the same gains and sometimes experienced small negative effects, likely because the move disrupted school and peer networks during a sensitive period.

These findings highlighted how strongly childhood environment shapes long-run mobility and showed that housing policies can have lasting effects when they reach children early in life.

In 2020, in collaboration with the U.S. Census, Chetty worked with Hendren and Friedman to construct the Opportunity Atlas, a comprehensive Census tract-level dataset of children's outcomes in adulthood using data covering nearly the entire U.S. population. The Atlas maps the roots of affluence and poverty back to the neighborhood level, demonstrating which areas of the country offer children the best opportunities to succeed.

== Recognition ==
In 2008, The Economist and The New York Times listed Chetty as one of the top eight young economists in the world, and has since become one of the most highly cited economists of his generation. In 2010, he received the Young Labor Economist Award from the Institute for the Study of Labor for his paper "Moral Hazard Versus Liquidity and Optimal Unemployment Insurance" in the Journal of Political Economy.

In 2012, he was one of 23 fellows to receive $500,000 over the following five years from the John D. and Catherine T. MacArthur Foundation as a recipient of one of the Foundation's Genius Grants.

Chetty was the recipient of the 2013 John Bates Clark Medal, awarded by the American Economic Association to "that American economist under the age of forty who is adjudged to have made a significant contribution to economic thought and knowledge."

Chetty was awarded the Padma Shri, an award for distinguished service in any field, by the Government of India in 2015.

George Mason University economist Tyler Cowen described Chetty in 2017 as "the single most influential economist in the world today."

Research by Chetty was covered by The New York Times, The Atlantic, Our World in Data, and Vox.

In 2018, he was elected a member of the National Academy of Sciences.

In 2019, he received an Andrew Carnegie Fellowship, awarded by the Carnegie Corporation of New York.

In December 2020, he received the Infosys Prize for Social Sciences – Economics "for his pioneering research on identifying barriers to economic opportunity and for developing solutions to help people escape from poverty towards better life outcomes."

In 2023, Chetty received an honorary Doctor of Sciences from North Carolina State University.

In 2024, Chetty was awarded the Benjamin Franklin Medal by the Royal Society for Arts (RSA) for his contributions to research on social mobility and economic opportunity.

== Publications ==
- Google Scholar profile
- Chetty, R.; Saez, E. (2005). "Dividend Taxes and Corporate Behavior: Evidence from the 2003 Dividend Tax Cut" (PDF). The Quarterly Journal of Economics. 120 (3): 791. doi:10.1093/qje/120.3.791. JSTOR 25098756. Archived from the original (PDF) on 2013-05-31.
- Chetty, Raj; Friedman, John N.; Hilger, Nathaniel; Saez, Emmanuel; Schanzenbach, Diane Whitmore; Yagan, Danny (2011). "How does your kindergarten classroom affect your earnings? Evidence from Project STAR" (PDF). The Quarterly Journal of Economics. 126 (4): 1593–1660. doi:10.1093/qje/qjr041. PMID 22256342.
