= David Laibson =

American economist

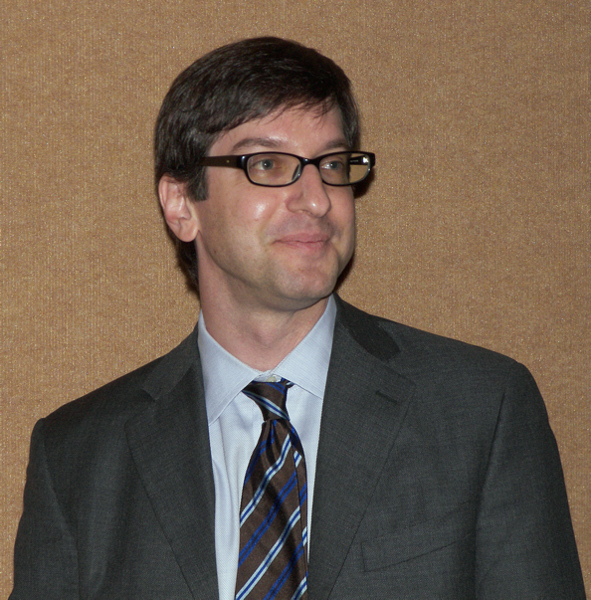
- David Laibson in 2007
- Born: June 26, 1966 (age 59)

Academic background
- Education: Harvard University (BA); London School of Economics (MSc); Massachusetts Institute of Technology (PhD)
- Doctoral advisor: Olivier Jean Blanchard; Roland Bénabou
- Influences: Benjamin M. Friedman; Matthew Rabin

Academic work
- Discipline: Macroeconomics; Behavioral economics
- Institutions: Harvard University
- Website: Information at IDEAS / RePEc

David Isaac Laibson (born June 26, 1966) is an American economist and professor at Harvard University, where he has taught since 1994. His research focuses on macroeconomics, intertemporal choice, behavioral economics, and neuroeconomics. In 2016, he became chairman of the Harvard economics department.

== Life and career ==
Laibson was raised by Ruth and Peter Laibson in Haverford, Pennsylvania. He received an AB (summa) from Harvard in 1988, studying under Benjamin M. Friedman, and went on to win a Marshall Scholarship to study at the London School of Economics (MSc in Econometrics and Mathematical Economics). He received his PhD from MIT in 1994 and joined the faculty at Harvard once he graduated. He has since gained tenure. He is married to the mathematician Nina Zipser, and they have a son, Max.

At Harvard, he teaches Economics 2030: Psychology and Economics. He also co-teaches Economics 10, the year-long introductory economics class at Harvard, together with Jason Furman. His research has been published in prestigious journals such as the QJE, AER, JEP, Econometrica, and Science.

Laibson has written a principles of economics textbook with MIT economist Daron Acemoglu and University of Chicago economist John A. List.
