= Benjamin M. Friedman =

American economist (born 1944)

- Born: 1944 (age 81–82); Kentucky, U.S.

Academic background
- Education: Harvard University (BA, MA, PhD); King's College, Cambridge (MSc)

Academic work
- Discipline: Macroeconomics
- Institutions: Harvard University
- Doctoral students: Glenn Hubbard

Benjamin Morton Friedman (/ˈfriːdmən/; born 1944) is an American political economist, who is the William Joseph Maier Professor of Political Economy at Harvard University. He is a member of the Council on Foreign Relations, the Brookings Institute's Panel on Economic Activity, and the editorial board of the Encyclopædia Britannica. He is a recipient of the John R. Commons Award, given by the economics honor society Omicron Delta Epsilon.

== Education and career ==
Friedman received his A.B., A.M., and Ph.D. degrees, all in economics, from Harvard University. He also received an M.Sc. in economics and politics from King's College, Cambridge, as a Marshall Scholar. He has been on the Harvard faculty since 1972. Currently Friedman is a member of the Committee on Capital Markets Regulation.

== Personal life ==
Friedman married Barbara Cook in 1972. Their son, John Friedman, is the inaugural dean of the Watson School of International and Public Affairs.

== Partial bibliography ==
- Economic Stabilization Policy: Methods in Optimization, American Elsevier (1975)
- Monetary Policy in the United States: Design and Implementation, Association of Reserve City Bankers (1981)
- Day of Reckoning: The Consequences of American Economic Policy under Reagan and After, Random House (1988)
- Implications of Increasing Corporate Indebtedness for Monetary Policy, Group of Thirty (New York, NY) (1990)
- Does Debt Management Matter?, with Jonas Agell and Mats Persson, Oxford University Press (New York, NY) (1992)
- The Moral Consequences of Economic Growth, Knopf (2005)
- Religion and the Rise of Capitalism, Knopf (2021)
