= Wendy J. Schiller =

American political scientist

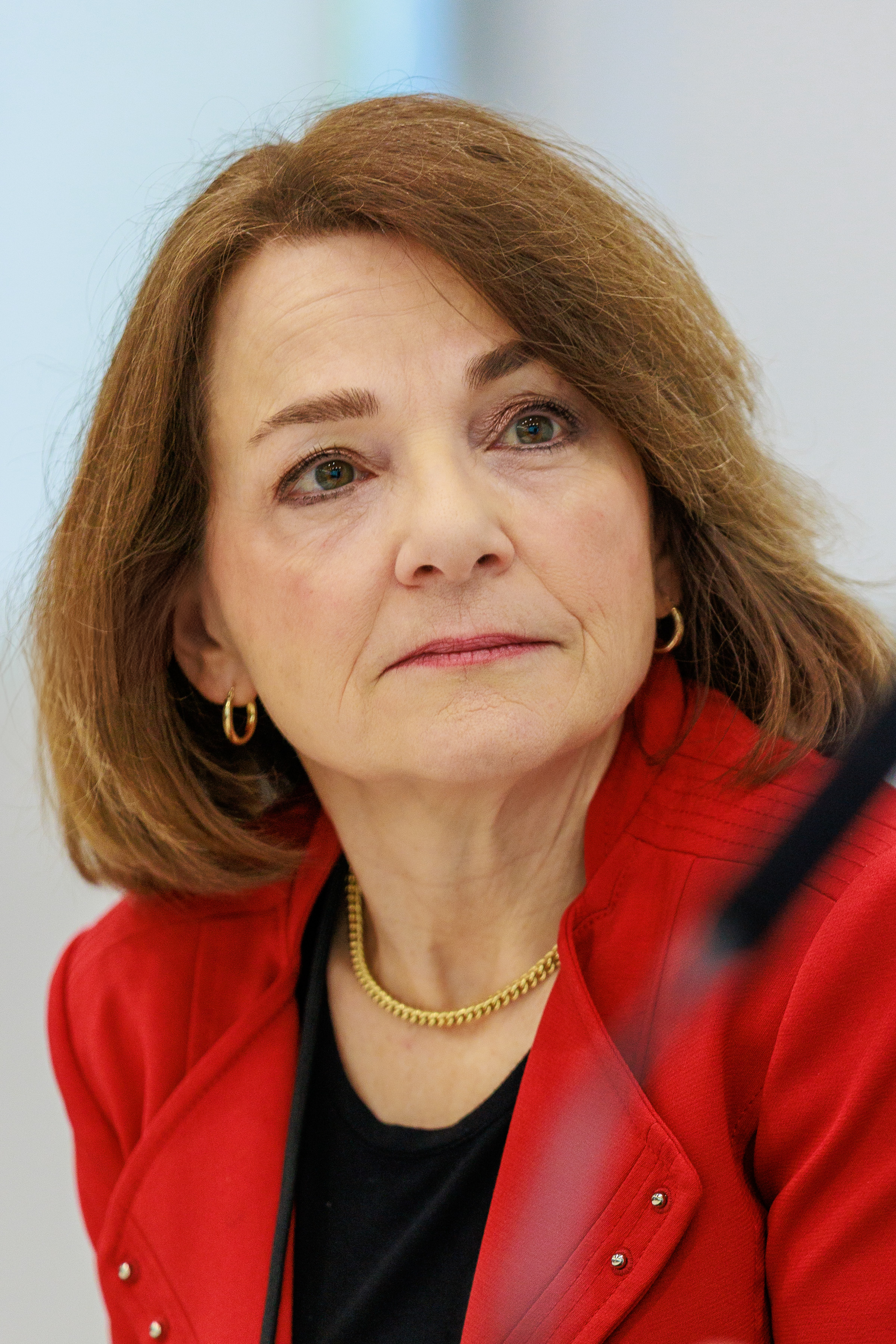
- Schiller in 2025

Academic background
- Education: University of Chicago; University of Rochester

Academic work
- Institutions: Brown University; Watson Institute

Wendy J. Schiller is the Howard R. Swearer Interim Director of the Thomas J. Watson Institute for International and Public Affairs at Brown University. She also serves as Director of the A. Alfred Taubman Center for American Politics and Policy and is the Alison S. Ressler Professor of Political Science. She was previously the Royce Family Professor of Teaching Excellence in Political Science.

Schiller received an undergraduate degree from the University of Chicago and completed her M.A and Ph.D. at the University of Rochester.

== Books ==
- Schiller, Wendy J.; Patashnik, Eric M., eds. (2021), Dynamics of American Democracy: Partisan Polarization, Political Competition and Government Performance, University Press of Kansas, ISBN 9780700630011
- Schiller, Wendy J.; Geer, John G.; Herrera, Richard; Segal, Jeffrey A., eds. (2021), Gateways to Democracy: An Introduction to American Government (5 ed.), Cengage, ISBN 9780357459218
- The Contemporary Congress (7 ed.), Rowman & Littlefield, 2018, ISBN 9780495004240 with Burdett A. Loomis
- Electing the Senate: Indirect Democracy before the Seventeenth Amendment, Princeton University Press, 2014, ISBN 9780691163161 with Charles Stewart III
- The Contemporary Congress (6 ed.), Rowman & Littlefield, 2015, ISBN 9781442249677 with Burdett A. Loomis
- Partners and Rivals: Representation in U.S. Senate Delegations, Princeton University Press, 2000, ISBN 9780691048871
