= The Three Trillion Dollar War =

Book by Joseph Eugene Stiglitz

- Author: Joseph E. Stiglitz; Linda Bilmes
- Language: English
- Genre: Nonfiction
- Publisher: W. W. Norton
- Publication date: 2008
- Publication place: United States
- Media type: Print (Hardback)
- Pages: 192
- ISBN: 978-0-393-06701-9
- OCLC: 181139407
- Dewey Decimal: 956.7044/31 22
- LC Class: DS79.76 .S698 2008

The Three Trillion Dollar War is a 2008 book by Nobel Prize laureate Joseph Stiglitz and Harvard Professor Linda Bilmes, both of whom are American economists. The book is based on a paper they presented in January 2006 titled The Economic Costs of the Iraq War: An Appraisal Three Years After the Beginning of the Conflict.

== Overview ==
The book examines the full cost of the Iraq War, including many hidden costs. The book also discusses the extent to which these costs will be imposed for many years to come, paying special attention to the expenditures that will be required to care for wounded veterans. The authors conclude by illustrating the opportunity cost of the resources spent on waging the war. The book was a New York Times and international best-seller and has been translated into 22 languages.

The total cost of $3 trillion is comparable to that found in other studies. The Joint Economic Committee of Congress estimated that the war would cost $3.5 trillion, while the non-partisan Congressional Budget Office projected that the total cost will reach between $1.4 and $2.2 trillion. The Stiglitz-Bilmes work builds on an earlier study by Yale economist William Nordhaus, who predicted in 2002 that the war could reach $2 trillion if it went badly. Numerous economists, including James K. Galbraith of the University of Texas and Nobel Laureate Lawrence Klein have supported the methodology in the book. Economist Fred Foldvary also wrote a positive review of the book in Econ Journal Watch in 2008. He believes better knowledge of both the budgeted and implicit costs of the war as spelled out in the book will further a more coherent dialogue on present and future related policy matters. The Costs of War Project at Brown University has estimated the costs at that time as being even higher. .

== Criticism ==
In a review of the 2006 NBER Working Paper the book is based on, economist Alan Krueger argued that Bilmes and Stiglitz's estimate was too high for three reasons. First, it counts future interest payments on the debt created by military spending as well as the direct expenditures, which is double counting. Second, it counts increased military recruitment costs that incorporate a premium for higher risk of death or injury and the direct cost of the deaths and injuries, which is also double counting. Third, it attributes a global increase in the price of oil entirely to the Iraq War.

Other academics, including John Lott, Richard Zerbe, and Edgar Browing, echoed those criticisms, and in addition challenged the Lancet surveys of Iraq War casualties to determine the number of Iraqi deaths.
