= Nadje Sadig Al-Ali =

Iraqi author

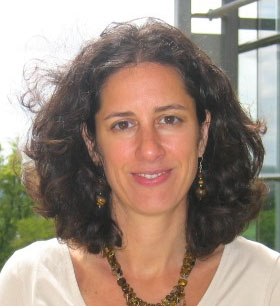
- Born: 1966 (age 59–60)

Academic background
- Education: University of Arizona; The American University in Cairo; SOAS University of London

Academic work
- Institutions: SOAS University of London; Brown University

Nadje Sadig Al-Ali (born 1966; Arabic: نادية صادق العلي) is a German-Iraqi academic of social anthropology and Middle East studies. She is currently the Robert Family Professor of International Studies and Professor of Anthropology and Middle East Studies at Brown University Watson Institute for International and Public Affairs. From 2010 to 2018, Al-Ali taught at SOAS University of London as a professor of gender studies.

== Life ==
Nadje Sadig Al-Ali was born to an Iraqi father and German mother in Germany. She did not learn Arabic as a child, and has not lived in Iraq; in a 2006 article she expressed discomfort with the "essentializing and simplistic" way the term ‘Iraqi’ has been ascribed to her "by the Western media, academia and Iraqi women alike."

Al-Ali was raised in North Rhine-Westphalia, Germany, where she lived until the age of 18. She attended the University of Arizona where she earned a BA from the Middle East Studies Department. In 1989, she moved to Cairo, Egypt, where she completed her MA at The American University in Cairo. During this time, she became involved in the Egyptian women's movement.

== Career ==
In 1994, Al-Ali moved to London to begin work towards her doctorate at SOAS University of London; she received her PhD in Social Anthropology from SOAS 1998. Al-Ali served as Professor of Gender Studies at SOAS from 2010 to 2018 and chaired the Centre for Gender Studies from 2017 to 2018.

She served as President of the Association of Middle East Women's Studies (AMEWS) from 2010 to 2012.

Alongside her academic career, Nadje Al-Ali was a co-founder of the Iraqi British organisation Act Together: Women's Action for Iraq in 2000. She was also a member of the London branch of Women in Black, a worldwide network of women who are against war and violence.

Many of her publications reflect the lives of Iraqi women and recent struggle to voice their opinions during the US-led invasion of Iraq.

== Bibliography ==
- Iraqi Women: Untold Stories from 1948 to the Present (2007)
- New Approaches to Migration (2002)
- Secularism & the State in the Middle East: The Egyptian Women’s Movements (2000)
- Gender Writing/Writing Gender: The representation of women in a selection of modern Egyptian literature (1994).
- What Kind of Liberation? Women and the Occupation of Iraq (with Nicola Pratt, 2009)
