= Catherine L. Besteman =

Italian American anthropologist

Catherine Lowe Besteman is an Italian American anthropologist at Colby College, where she holds the Francis F. Bartlett and Ruth K. Bartlett Chair in Anthropology. Her research and practice engage the public humanities to explore abolitionist possibilities in Maine. She has taught at that institution since 1994. Since 2005, she is known for her work with Somali Bantu refugees who have migrated from East Africa to Lewiston, Maine.

== Early life and education ==
Besteman received her BA from Amherst College, and her MA and PhD from the University of Arizona.

== Career ==
Besteman’s areas of expertise include refugees, southern Somalia, South Africa, and, more generally, insecurity and violence, and inequality and racism. She also specializes in studying humanitarianism and activism. She writes in support of an engaged approach to anthropology, which involves advocacy, teaching, and collaboration with the people who are the focus of study. Besteman has studied Southern Somalia extensively, and has written a number of books and papers about this area. She has criticized traditional anthropological and media portrayals of Somalis and of the Somalian civil war since it began in the early 1990s,.

=== Research and work ===
Besteman began working in southern Somalia in the late eighties before the outbreak of civil war in 1991. Many refugees from the communities where she had worked in Somalia have resettled in Lewiston, Maine. Under her direction, members of the local Bantu community and Colby College students have produced a wiki-type website about the Somali Bantus of Lewiston. A museum exhibition: "Rivers of Immigration: Peoples of the Androscoggin" was mounted at the Museum L-A, in conjunction with the wiki project, from 2009 to 2010.

During the 2000s, Besteman studied Cape Town, South Africa, focusing on the work of grassroots organizations in the city after the end of apartheid. Her book Transforming Cape Town (2008) describes several of these organizations and contrasts incidents of traditionalism with those of innovation.

Besteman received a Guggenheim Foundation grant and an American Council of Learned Societies (ACLS) Fellowship in 2012 to work on a book project. In late 2013, the Rockefeller Foundation awarded her a residency for spring 2014.

Besteman has co-edited three books for general readership with Hugh Gusterson: Why America’s Top Pundits are Wrong: Anthropologists Talk Back (2005), The Insecure American: How We Got Here and What We Should Do About It (2009), and Life By Algorithms: How Roboprocesses Are Remaking Our World (2019).

== Selected publications ==
=== Books ===
- Besteman, C. (2020). Militarized Global Apartheid. Duke University Press.
- Besteman, C. & Gusterson, H. (Eds) (2019) Life by Algorithms: How Roboprocesses Are Remaking Our World. University of Chicago Press.
- Besteman, C. (2016). Making Refuge: Somali Bantu Refugees and Lewiston, Maine. Duke University Press
- Gusterson, H. & Besteman, C.L. (Eds.). (2009). The Insecure American: How We Got Here and What We Should Do About It. University of California Press.
- Besteman, C. (2008). Transforming Cape Town. University of California Press.
- Besteman, C. L., & Gusterson, H. (Eds.). (2005). Why America's Top Pundits Are Wrong: Anthropologists Talk Back. University of California Press.
- Besteman, C. L. (Ed.). (2002). Violence: A Reader. New York University Press.
- Besteman, C. (1999). Unraveling Somalia: Race, Violence, and the Legacy of Slavery. University of Pennsylvania Press.
- Besteman, C., & Cassanelli, L. V. (1996). The Struggle for Land in Southern Somalia: the War Behind the War. Westview Press.

=== Papers ===
- Besteman, C. (2019). On Ethnographic Unknowability. In Carole Ann McGranahan, ed., Scholars and Writers: Writing Anthropology, Ethnography, and Beyond. Durham, NC: Duke University Press.
- Besteman, (2019). C. Militarized Global Apartheid. Current Anthropology, Volume 60, Supplement 19: S26-S38.
- Besteman, C. (2017). Experimenting in Somalia: The New Security Empire. Anthropological Theory 17(3): 404-420.
- Besteman, (2015). C. Ethnography of a Somali Ethnographic Photography Archive in Maine. In A. Gubrium, K. Harper, and M. Otañez, eds., Participatory Visual and Digital Research in Action. Walnut Creek, CA: Left Coast Press.
- Besteman, C. (2013). Somali Bantus in a State of Refuge. Bildhaan: An International Journal of Somali Studies 12: 11-33.
- Besteman, C. (2011). Cultural / Social Anthropology and Ethnography. In J. E. Miller and O. Schmid, eds., How to Get Published: A Guide for Anthropology Students and Young Professionals. Lanham MD: AltaMira Press1.
- Besteman, C. (2010). In and Out of the Academy: Policy and the Case for a Strategic Anthropology. Human Organization, 69(4), 407-417.
- Besteman, C. (1998). Primordialist blinders: A reply to IM Lewis. Cultural Anthropology, 13(1), 109-120.
- Besteman, C. (1996). Representing violence and "othering" Somalia. Cultural Anthropology, 11(1), 120-133.
- Besteman, C. (1994). Individualisation and the assault on customary tenure in Africa: title registration programmes and the case of Somalia. Africa-London-International African Institute, 64, 484-484.
