= Catherine Lutz =

American anthropologist

- Born: January 22, 1952 (age 74)

Academic background
- Education: Swarthmore College (BA); Harvard University (PhD)

Catherine A. Lutz (/lʌts/; born 1952) is an American anthropologist who is the Thomas J. Watson Jr. Family Professor of Anthropology and International Studies at Brown University. She is also a research professor at the Watson Institute where she serves as a director of the Costs of War Project, which attempts to calculate the financial costs of the Iraq and Afghanistan wars.

== Education ==
Lutz received a B.A. in sociology and anthropology from Swarthmore College in 1974. She then received a Ph.D. in social anthropology from Harvard University in 1980.

== Career ==
Early in her career, Lutz served as assistant professor at Harvard University and associate professor at Binghamton University. Between 1992 and 2003, she worked at the University of North Carolina at Chapel Hill. She joined Brown University in 2003, serving as chair of the department of anthropology between 2009 and 2012.

Lutz served as president of the American Ethnological Society from 2001 to 2005. She is a founder of the Network of Concerned Anthropologists.

In April 2013, Lutz was awarded a Guggenheim Fellowship to “write a book on the contemporary moralities of American war" that will include a nationwide sample of interviews in order to “understand what popular histories and evaluations of the post-9/11 wars are emerging in a diverse range of communities.”

=== Awards ===
- 2013: John Simon Guggenheim Memorial Foundation Fellowship
- 2010: Distinguished Career Award, Society for the Anthropology of North America
- 2008: Delmos Jones and Jagna Sharff Memorial Prize for the Critical Study of North America for Local Democracy Under Siege
- 2007-08: Matina S. Horner Distinguished Visiting professor, Radcliffe Institute for Advanced Study
- 2002: Anthony Leeds Prize for Homefront
- 2002: Victor Turner Prize in Ethnographic Writing, Honorable Mention for Homefront
- 1993: American Association of University Publishers, Honorable Mention for Best Book in Sociology and Anthropology for Reading National Geographic
- 1980: Stirling Award in Culture and Personality Studies, American Anthropological Association
- 1980: C. S. Ford Cross-Cultural Research Award, Society for Cross Cultural Research

=== Areas of interest ===
==== Military, war, and society ====
Lutz's primary interest is military, war, and society. Following are two summaries in which she explicates her views. One from April 11, 2008, on Antiwar Radio:

This interview discussed the United States’ presence in Iraq and other countries throughout the world. Lutz states that there are over seven hundred official US military bases throughout the world. These permanent bases are usually established after wars: Germany, Japan, Italy, and Korea to name a few. The estimated cost to maintain these bases is 140 billion dollars. Not only are these bases extremely expensive, but they also create anti-American feelings from the host population of the countries. According to Lutz, some of these bases, like in the Philippines, “dance with dictators” in the fact that the US turns a blind eye in order to have a base in the country. Sometimes the bases supported arms deals within these countries that had antidemocratic effects. Lutz also points out the fact that many U.S. companies benefit in the construction and maintenance of these oversea bases.

Another important issue Lutz brings to light is, what exactly is the purpose of permanent US bases throughout the world. In the case of Iraq, would it be to promote stability or would it be an oil protection plan? Lutz argues that maintaining permanent bases throughout the world does not promote stability, and in fact, are actually seen as aggression from the US, which threatens other countries in the world, like China. Lutz presents that permanent bases are more about “power protection” and the ability to “wage war." She says the U.S. maintains permanent bases throughout the world to establish a “global military stance” and to create the ability to control events in all areas of the world.

The second took place on September 10, 2011, on Open Source Radio Arts, Ideas and Politics:

The interview was about research Lutz, and a team of other academics conducted about the Iraq and Afghanistan wars. The study estimates a body count of 6,000 US troops and a total of 260,000 people who died directly from violence. Lutz also notes that many more people die indirectly from things like the loss of medical supplies and food supplies.

Lutz’s study also includes an interesting cost evaluation. The study estimated that including all the money that has been spent on the war, future money spent on things like future veterans costs, and additional interest equals around 5 trillion dollars. The study compares this to Bin Laden, who spent around $500,000 training people for the 9/11 attack. For every dollar Bin Laden spent, the US has spent anywhere from 7, 8, 9, million dollars. The study also notes that the money that has been spent on the wars has diverted resources from “building basics of modern economy” like education, infrastructure of transit and so on. The money has been invested in something other than the basics of a strong economy. Lutz says that 800,000 jobs would have been created if that money would have been spent on healthcare or in education, and in addition, these sectors have suffered.

Another serious question Lutz addresses is why hasn’t the US government collected this data and made it public? She asks, “what kind of governance do we have that we can engage in war on a quick impulse with little information, where ten years later it is left for the university to a number of people together to try to assess something that the government should have assessed 2, 3, 4 years out.” She notes that a lot of companies have profited from the war, and that the amount of waste and corruption surrounding these wars has been monumental. The study also notes that the US has not made friends through the invasion of Iraq, in particular. In addition to massive spending, civil liberties and human rights violations have been excused on the basis of national security. The idea of promoting national security also relates to the fact that the US continues to invest in military bases where it does not make good sense.

Lutz’s research also might create a conversation of why do we think force works? Lutz says there is a “magical thinking” in which people assume that if something bad did not happen to us, it must be because we developed military forces in the Middle East." She says that the evidence does not support this, and says “the idea that we have been kept safe by these wars is mistaken." Another question that presents itself through Lutz’s study is would the war have been different with the draft or a war tax? She questions whether there would have been less public complacency if there were a draft or a war tax.

Lutz concludes the interview by stating the need for the US to evaluate the mistakes that were made with these wars. She says “there isn’t much space in our political culture for reflection." She criticizes Obama for saying that “we need to turn the page on Iraq,” and argues that we don’t even know what story we wrote. She says we need to understand what/how it happened and will it happen again. In the case of Iraq and Afghanistan, we went to liberate the people and establish a democracy, and this did not really happen. Lutz stresses the importance of examination and reflection of these wars.

Other interests include race and gender, democracy, automobiles in a global perspective, subjectivity and power, photography and cultural history, critical theory, anthropological methods, sociocultural contexts of science, U.S. twentieth-century history and ethnography, and Asia-Pacific.

== Publications ==
Catherine Lutz's books include:

- 2019: War and Health: The Medical Consequences of the Wars in Iraq and Afghanistan.
- 2015: Schooled: Ordinary, Extraordinary Teaching in an Age of Change
- 2010: Carjacked: Carjacked: The Culture of the Automobile and its Effect on Our Lives
- 2010: Breaking Ranks: Iraq Veterans Speak Out against the War
- 2009: The Bases of Empire: The Global Struggle Against U. S. Military Posts
- 2007: Local Democracy Under Siege: Activism, Public Interests, and Private Politics
- 2004: La dépression est-elle universelle?
- 2001: Homefront: A Military City and the American Twentieth Century
- 1993: Reading National Geographic
- 1993: New Directions in Psychological Anthropology
- 1990: Language and the Politics of Emotion
- 1988: Unnatural Emotions: Everyday Sentiments on a Micronesian Atoll and Their Challenge to Western Theory
- 1984: Micronesia as strategic colony: the impact of U.S. policy on Micronesian health and culture

She has published over 80 other various works including book reviews, articles, book chapter and, policy reports. Lutz also blogs for The Huffington Post.

== Video ==
- "Costs of War at home", Catherine Lutz speaking at IVAW conference
- "U.S. Wars in Projected to Cost Nearly $4 Trillion With Hundreds of Thousands Dead", Democracy Now!, June 30, 2011.
