= Watson School of International and Public Affairs =

Research center at Brown University

Coordinates: 41.82515°N 71.39999°W

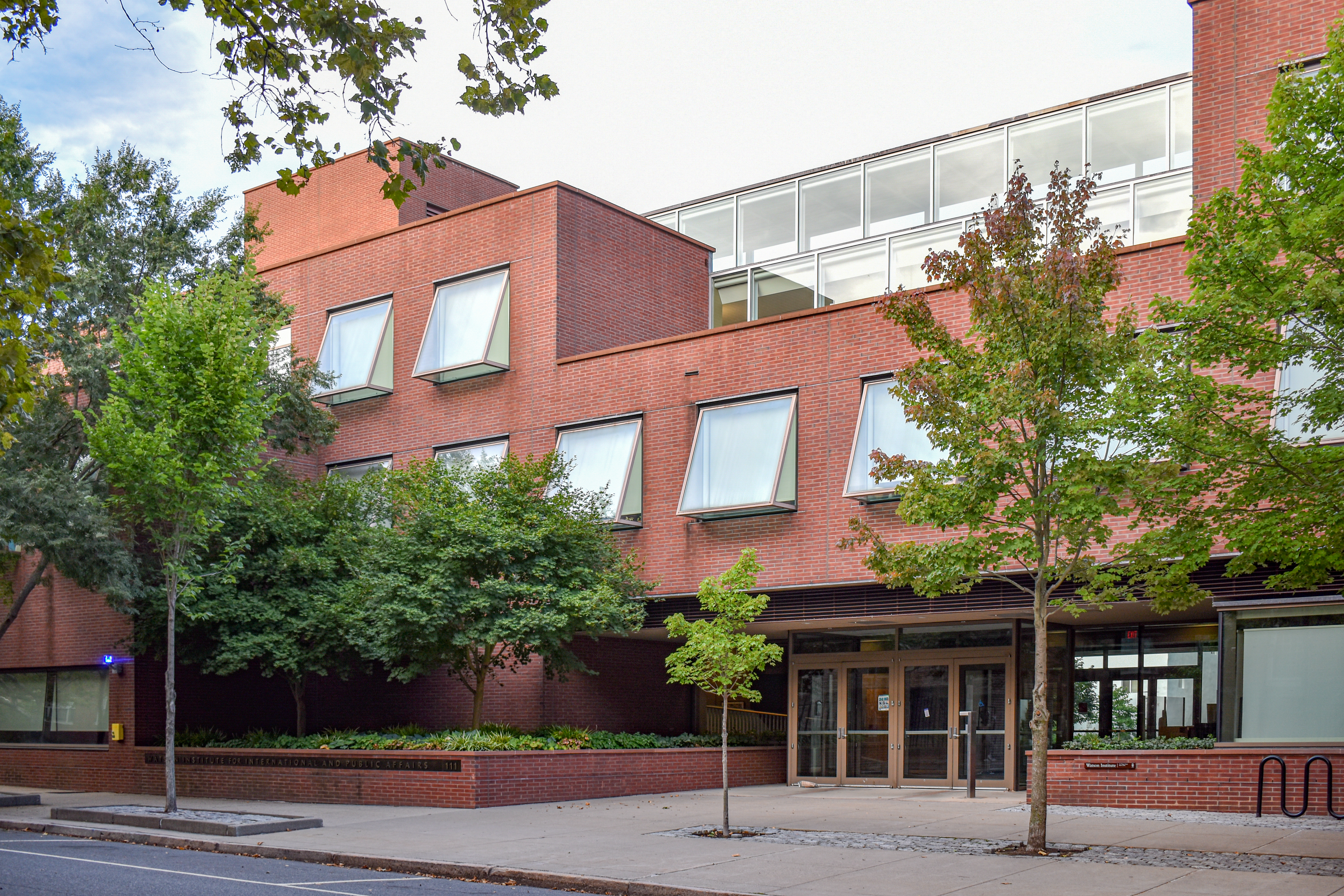
- Named after: Thomas J. Watson Jr.
- Formation: 1981; 45 years ago
- Purpose: Research, Teaching, and Public Engagement
- Headquarters: 111 Thayer Street, Providence, RI, 02912
- Leader: Wendy J. Schiller
- Parent organization: Brown University
- Endowment: $80 million (2015)
- Website: watson.brown.edu
- Formerly called: Center for Foreign Policy Development; The Watson Institute for International and Public Affairs

The Watson School of International and Public Affairs is a school at Brown University in Providence, Rhode Island. Its mission is to promote a just and peaceful world through research, teaching, and public engagement. The school's research focuses on three main areas: development, security, and governance. Its faculty include anthropologists, economists, political scientists, sociologists, and historians, as well as journalists and other practitioners. Political Scientist Edward Steinfeld, director of the Watson Institute from 2016 to 2024, was the school's founding dean. Economist John Friedman serves as the school's inaugural dean.

== Location ==
The school occupies three buildings surrounding a central plaza located at the southern edge Brown's campus on the East Side of Providence, Rhode Island. The first is a modern and architecturally distinctive building at 111 Thayer Street, designed by Uruguayan architect Rafael Viñoly in 2001. The second, Stephen Robert '62 Hall, is a glass-walled structure at 280 Brook Street designed by architect Toshiko Mori and completed in 2018. The institute also occupies a 19th-century building at 59 Charlesfield Street renovated in 2018.

== History ==
The Watson School was originally established as a research institute intended to fulfil two parallel missions: "to bring international perspective into the life of Brown University, and to promote peace through international relations research and policy." In 1981, with the support and guidance of 1937 Brown alumnus Thomas J. Watson Jr., former chairman of IBM and Ambassador to the Soviet Union, Brown University founded the Center for Foreign Policy Development. The center was formed to explore solutions to the major global issues of the day, foremost of which was the possibility of a nuclear encounter between the United States and the Soviet Union. In 1986, the university created the Institute for International Studies to integrate the center and Brown's other international programs.

In 1991, following a $25 million gift from Watson, the institute was rededicated in his honor. Originally housed in five separate locations on campus, the institute's programs moved into a single building at 111 Thayer Street, designed by architect Rafael Viñoly, in January 2002.

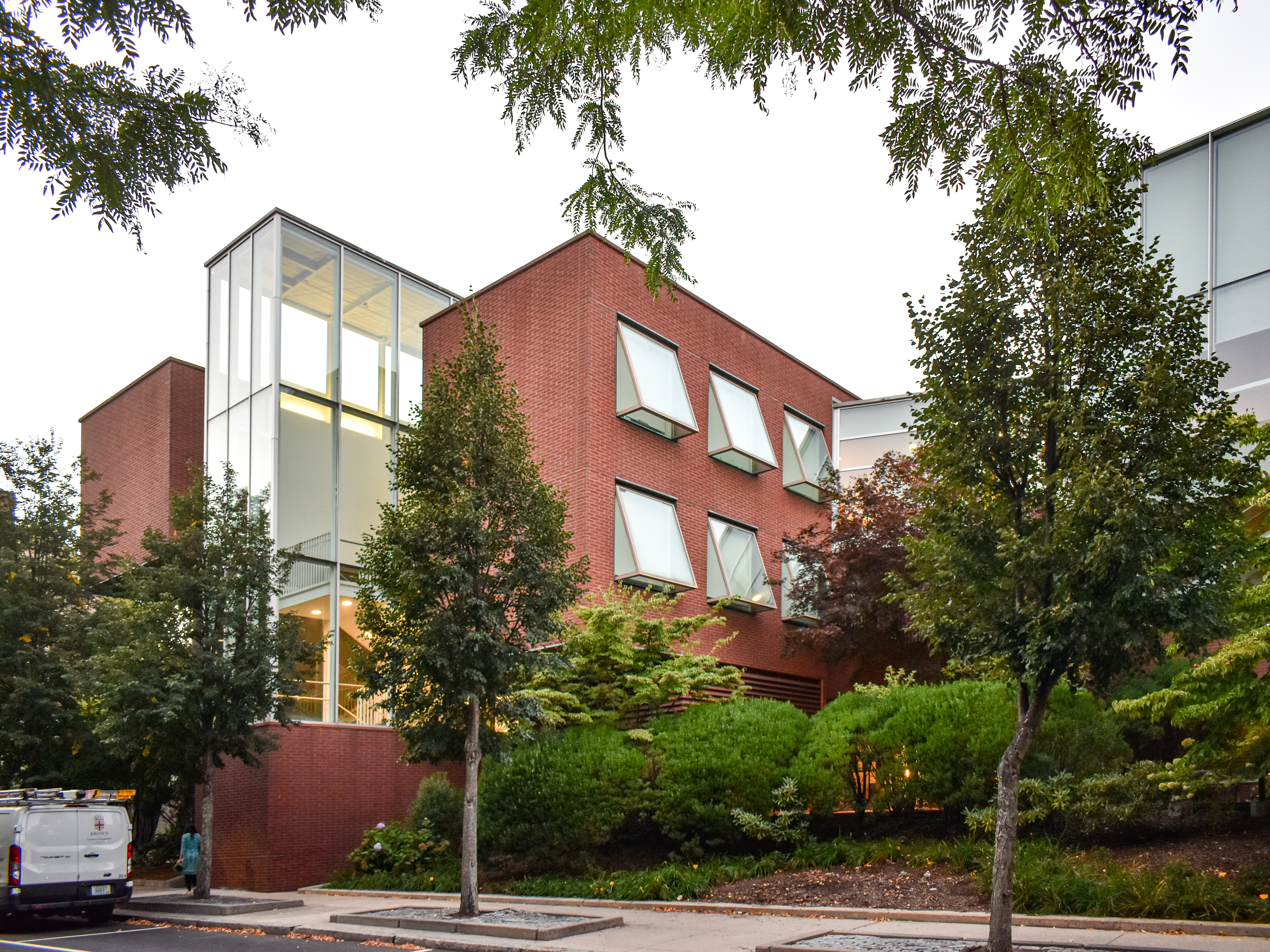
The rear of the Viñoly–designed main building

=== 2014–2019: Expansion ===
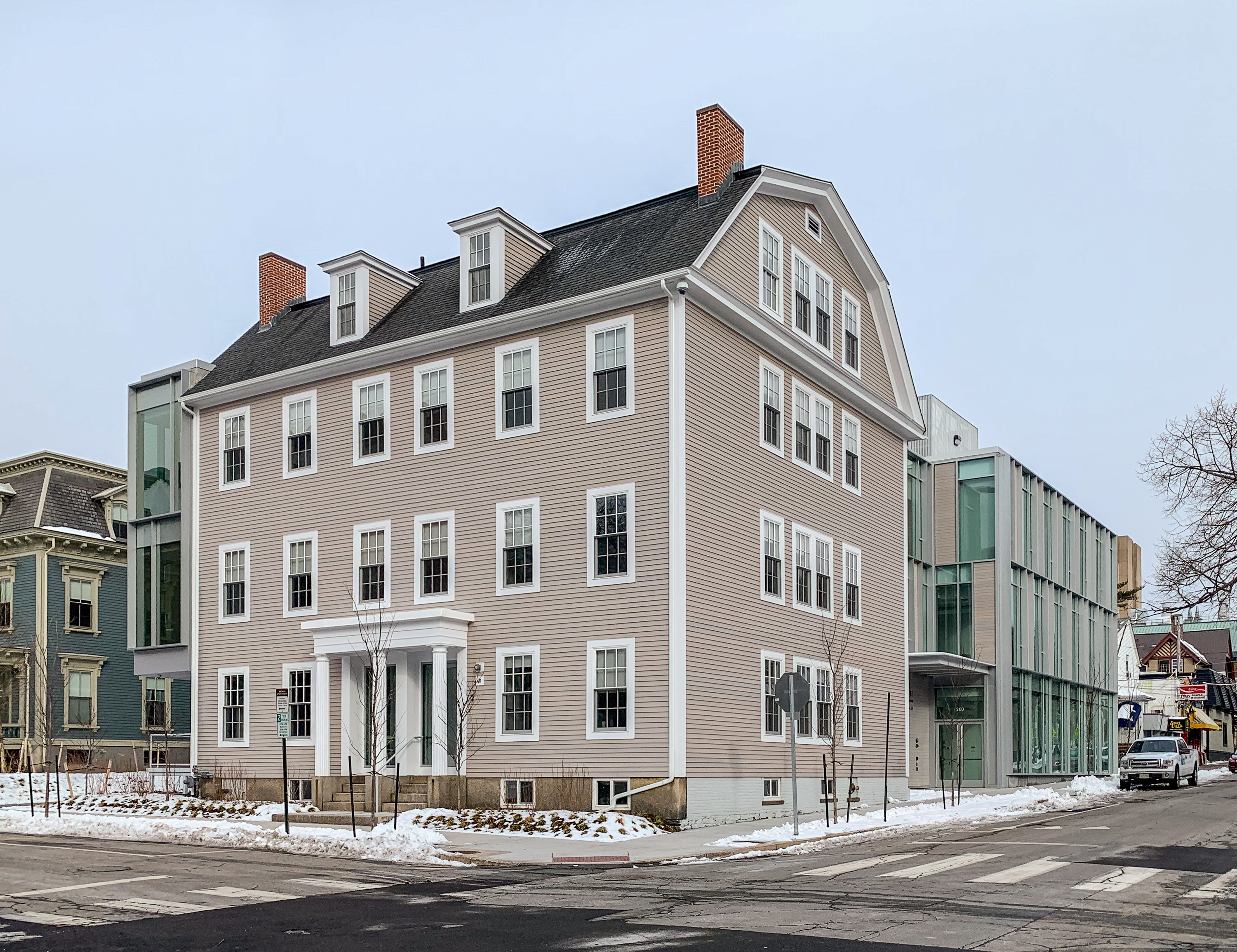
63-65 Charlesfield Street, with Stephen Robert Hall behind it

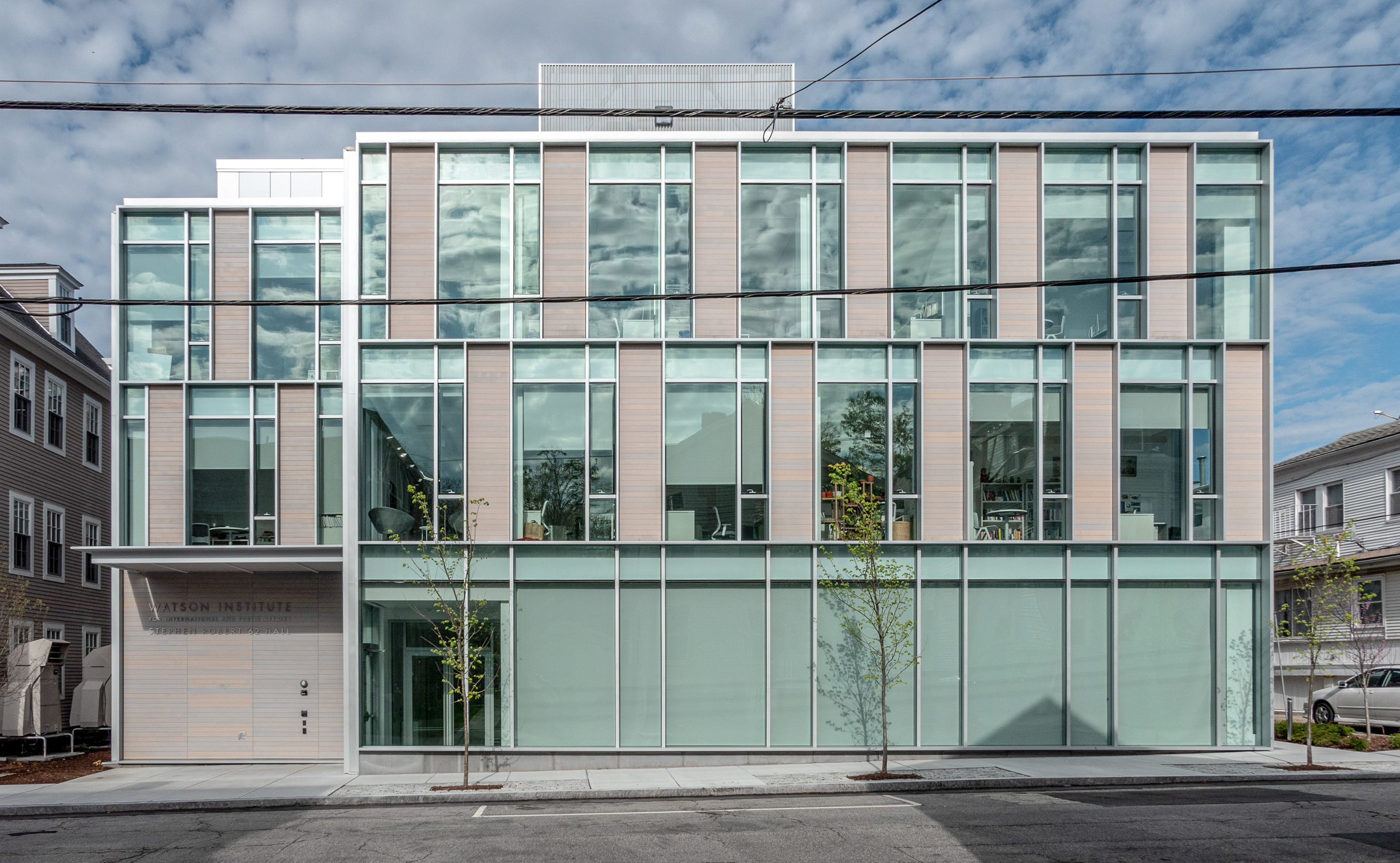
Stephen Robert Hall opened in 2018.

In 2014, the Watson Institute merged with the Taubman Center for American Politics and Policy, which had previously been housed in the Department of Political Science. Speaking of the motivation behind the merger, then–director Richard M. Locke cited the increasingly inseparable nature of domestic and foreign policy.

In 2015, the Institute received a $50 million gift to expand facilities and hire additional faculty. This gift enabled the construction of a new building at 280 Brook Street and renovation of an existing building at 59 Charlesfield Street.

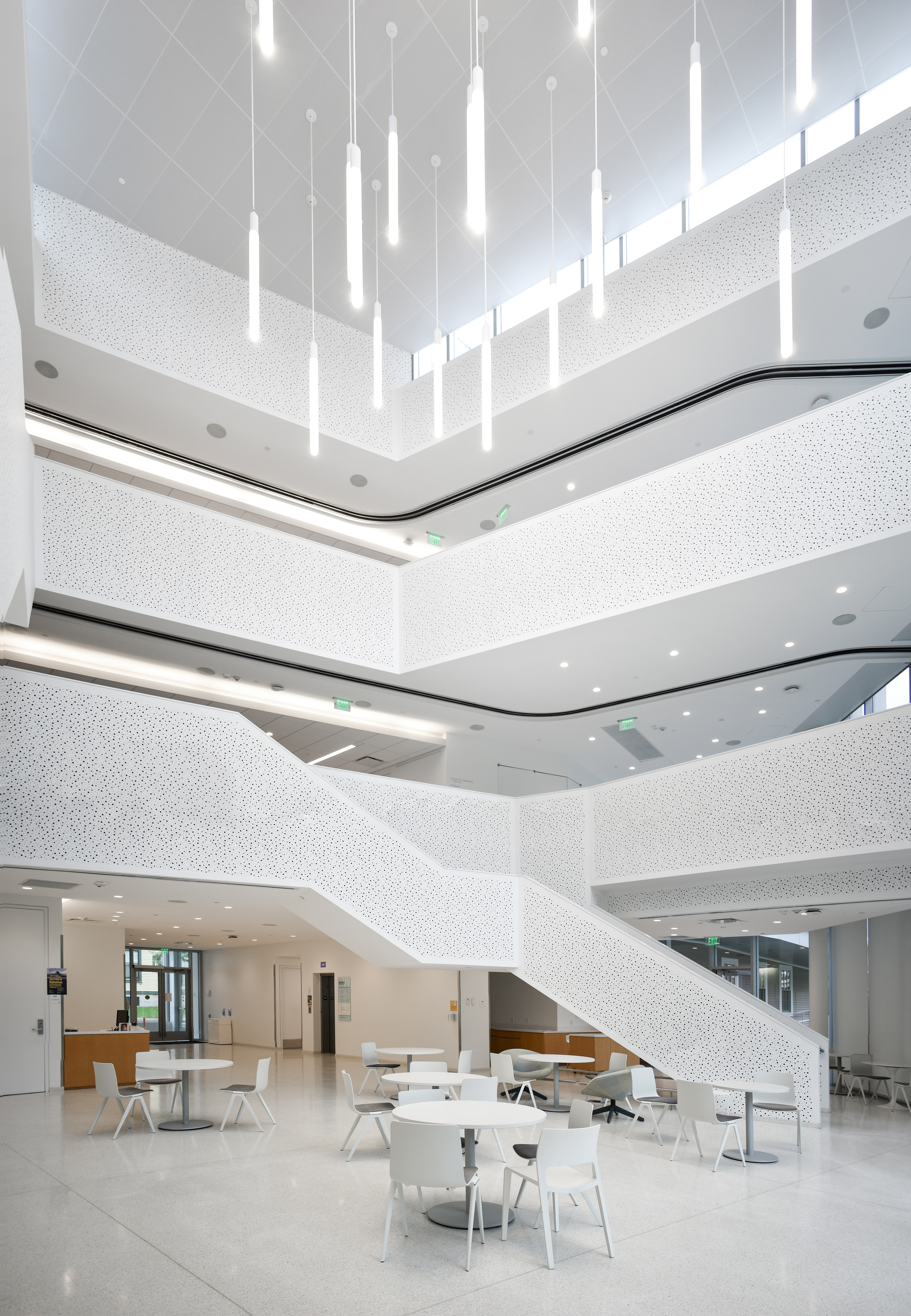
The interior of Stephen Robert Hall

In 2019, the institute established the Center for Human Rights and Humanitarian Studies (CHR&HS) as a permanent and endowed center. The center replaced the Humanitarian Innovation Initiative, which was established in 2016.

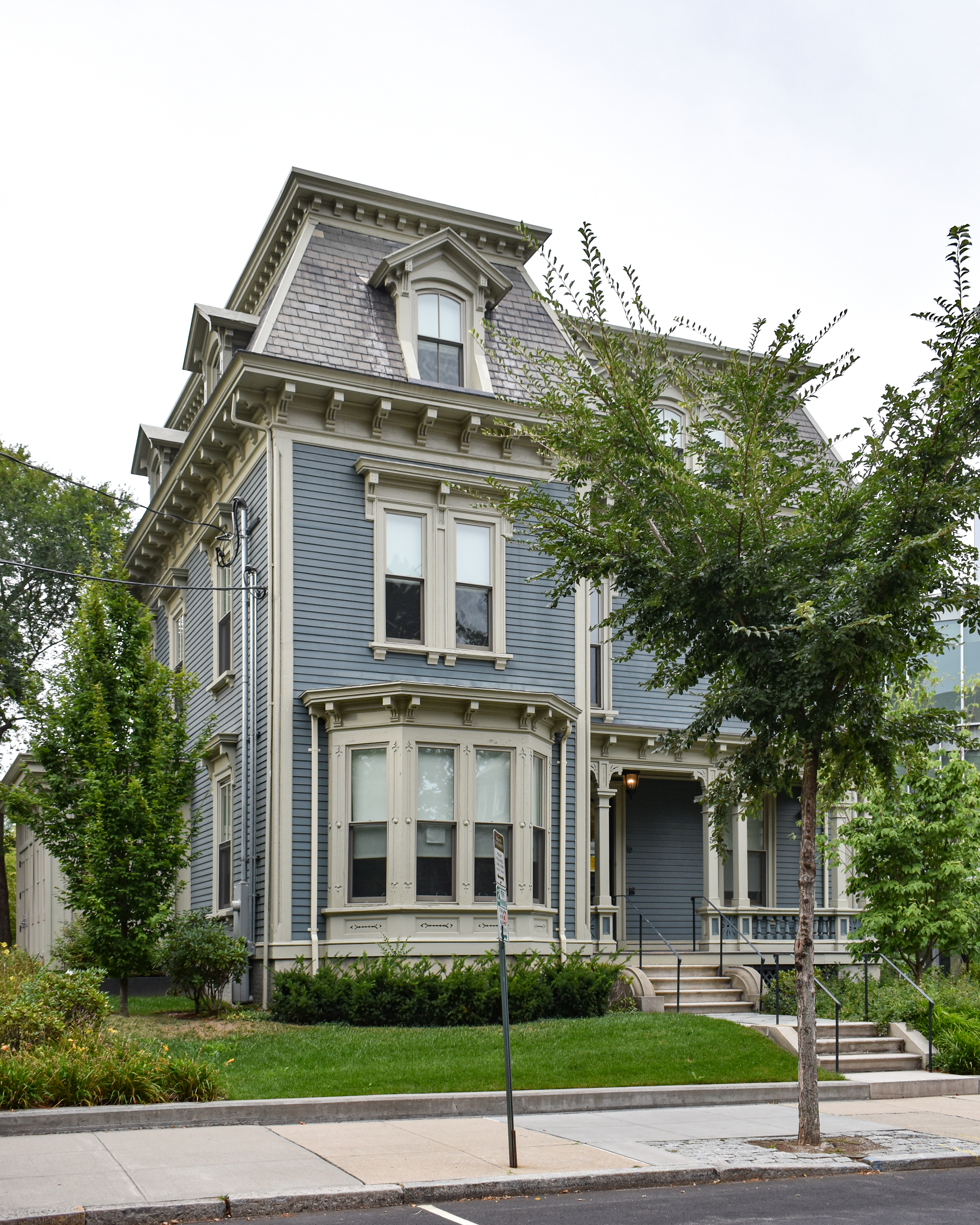
59 Charlesfield Street

=== 2024: Becoming a school ===
Brown University transitioned the institute to a school in July 2025. This initiative aimed to enhance research and education on global economic, political, and policy issues, serving both undergraduate and graduate students. The school intends to integrate the Watson Institute for International and Public Affairs and will draw faculty from diverse academic disciplines. The establishment of this new school was approved by the Corporation of Brown University, following years of planning. This will be the university's fifth school, joining the School of Professional Studies, the School of Public Health, the School of Engineering, and the Warren Alpert Medical School.

== Academic programs ==
The Watson School offers a single undergraduate degree program in International and Public Affairs. The concentration features both a core curriculum as well as three specialized tracks (Development, Security, and Policy & Governance) among which students can choose.

Graduate programs offered at the Watson School include the Graduate Program in Development (Ph.D.) and the Public Policy Program (M.P.A.). The Graduate Program in Development (GPD) is an NSF-funded, interdisciplinary program that supports the training of PhD candidates in anthropology, political science, economics, and sociology. The Public Policy program is a one-year intensive (summer – fall – spring) full-time degree with a focus on quantitative policy analysis and management. Since 2017, the school has also offered a fifth year M.P.A program for Brown undergraduates.

The school also offers Post Doctoral, professional development, and global outreach programming.

== Area studies ==
The following area studies centers are based at Watson: the Brazil Initiative, the Africa Initiative, the Saxena Center for Contemporary South Asia, the Center for Latin American and Caribbean Studies (CLACS), the China Initiative, and Middle East Studies (MES).

== Professional programs ==
Two professional outreach programs are based at the school. The Brown International Advanced Research Institutes (BIARI) provides the opportunity for junior scholars and practitioners from all over the world to study together at the school. According to Watson's website, BIARI "aims to build transnational scholarly networks while also providing opportunities for professional development. Each summer, BIARI brings promising young faculty from the Global South together with leading scholars in their fields for two-week intensive residential institutes."

Choices develops and publishes curriculum resources for high school social studies classrooms, and leads seminars for secondary school teachers. The program's mission is "to equip young people with the skills, habits, and knowledge necessary to be engaged citizens who are capable of addressing international issues with thoughtful public discourse and informed decision making."

== Research ==
=== Costs of War Project ===
In recent years, the most internationally cited product of the Watson School has been its Costs of War Project, first released in 2011 and continuously updated since. The project comprises a team of economists, anthropologists, political scientists, legal experts, and physicians, and seeks to calculate the economic costs, human casualties, and impact on civil liberties of the wars in Iraq, Afghanistan, Pakistan and others since 2001. The project has been described as the most extensive and comprehensive public accounting of the cost of post-September 11th U.S. military operations compiled to date.

=== Publications ===
The Watson School is the editorial home to three academic journals:

- Brown Journal of World Affairs
- Studies in Comparative International Development
- Journal of Health Politics, Policy and Law

Watson also publishes a working paper series, distributed by SSRN:

- Watson Working Papers

== Notable faculty and fellows ==
=== Diplomats and politicians ===
Notable diplomats who have served as faculty and fellows at the Watson School include 22nd U.S. Ambassador to the United Nations, Richard Holbrooke and former deputy secretary-general of the OECD and 11th Administrator of the U.S. Agency for International Development, J. Brian Atwood. Heads of state and government who have served as faculty and fellows include the 34th President of Brazil, Fernando Henrique Cardoso; the 31st President of Chile, Ricardo Lagos; former Chancellor of Austria, Alfred Gusenbauer; and two-time Prime Minister of Italy, Romano Prodi. Other fellows and faculty of note include the 12th president of the World Bank, Jim Yong Kim; former Chair of the Democratic National Committee and Secretary of Labor, Tom Perez; 7th lieutenant governor of Maryland, Michael Steele; Kenyan activist Kakenya Ntaiya; and 16th Chief Economic Advisor to the Government of India, Arvind Subramanian.

=== Academics ===
- Nadje Sadig Al-Ali, director, Middle East Studies
- Omer Bartov, faculty fellow
- Mark Blyth, director, William R. Rhodes Center for International Economics and Finance
- Robert K. Brigham, former visiting professor of International Relations
- James Der Derian, former professor of Research
- Peter B. Evans, faculty fellow
- John Friedman, professor of Economics and International and Public Affairs
- Justine Hastings, professor of Economics and International and Public Affairs
- Shirley Brice Heath, professor-at-large (2003–2010)
- Patrick Heller, director, Development Research Program
- Eugene Jarecki, visiting fellow
- Ieva Jusionyte, Watson Family University Professor of International Security and Anthropology
- David Kertzer, faculty fellow, recipient of the Pulitzer Prize
- Stephen Kinzer, senior fellow
- Margaret Levi, senior fellow (2013–2014)
- Glenn Loury, professor of Economics
- Catherine Lutz, professor of Anthropology
- Rose McDermott, director, postdoctoral program
- Brian C. O'Neill, former associate professor (research)
- Emily Oster, professor of Economics
- Eric M. Patashnik, professor of Political Science
- Wendy J. Schiller, professor of Political Science
- Galina Starovoytova, former visiting scholar
- J. Ann Tickner, visiting adjunct professor (2004–2009)
- Ashutosh Varshney, director, Center for Contemporary South Asia
- Robert Wade, professor of International Political Economy (1996–99)
- Margaret Weir, professor of International and Public Affairs and Political Science
- Thomas G. Weiss, associate director, research professor (1990–98)
- Xu Wenli, visiting senior fellow
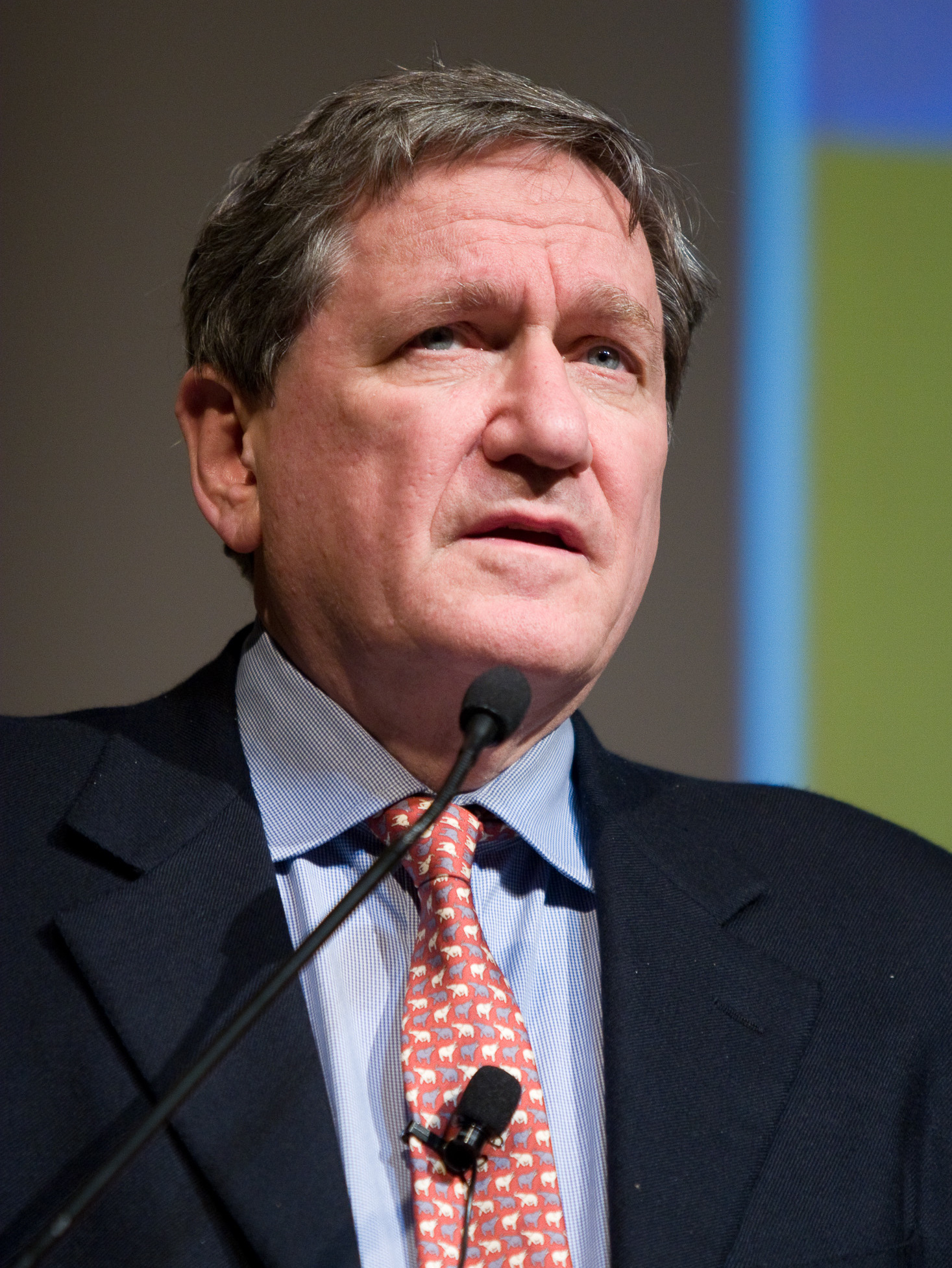
Diplomat Richard Holbrooke

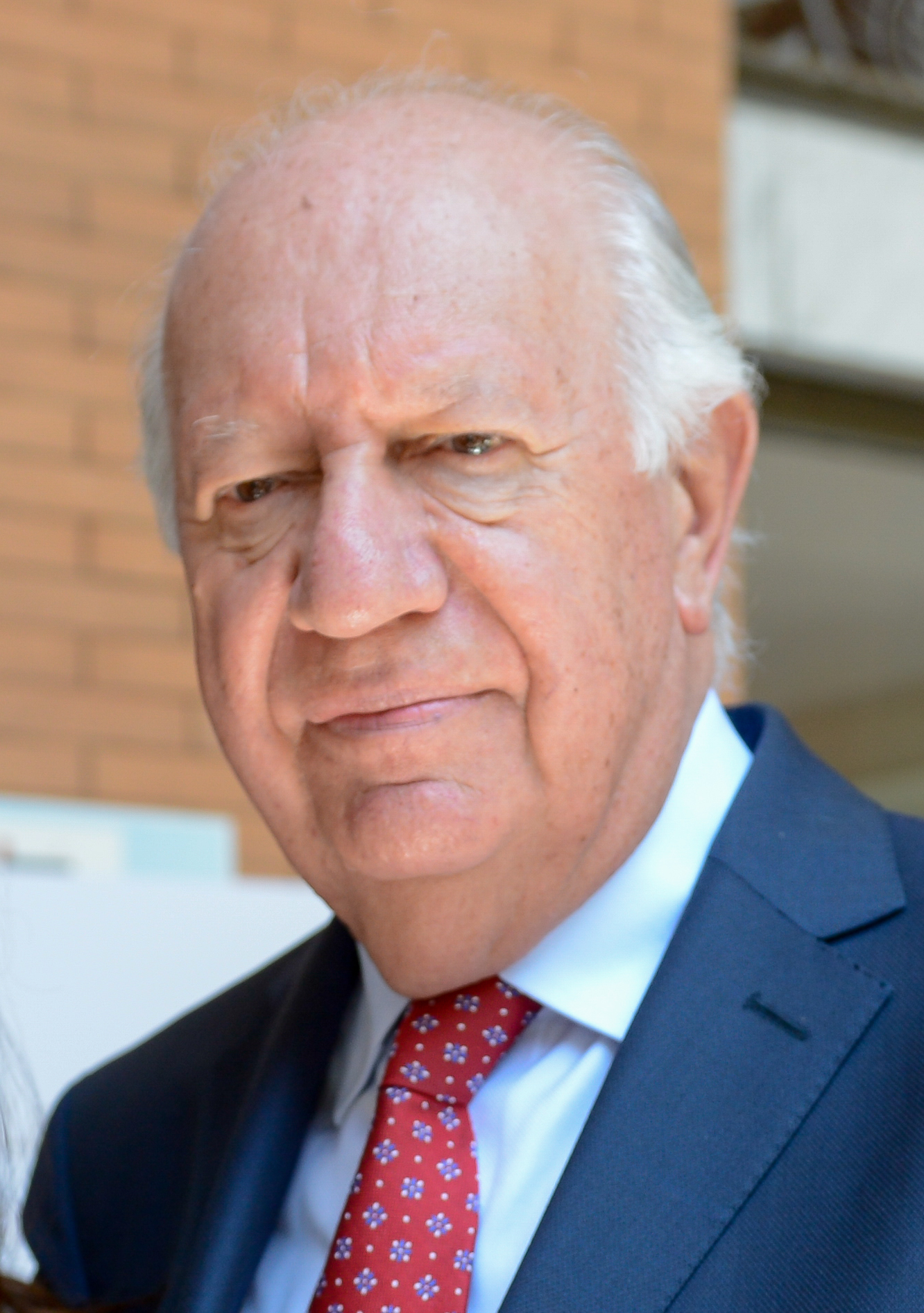
President of Chile, Ricardo Lagos

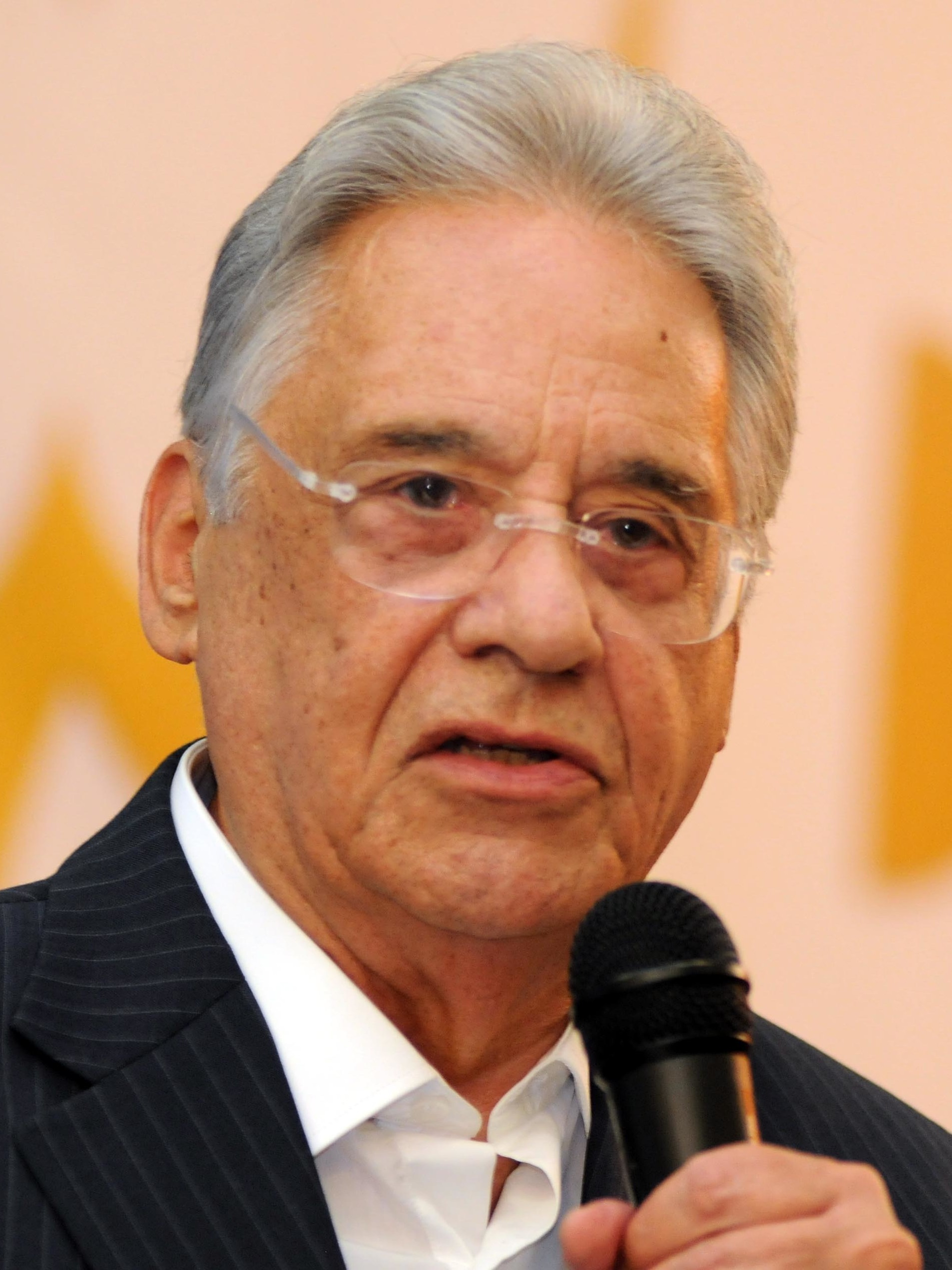
President of Brazil, Fernando Cardoso

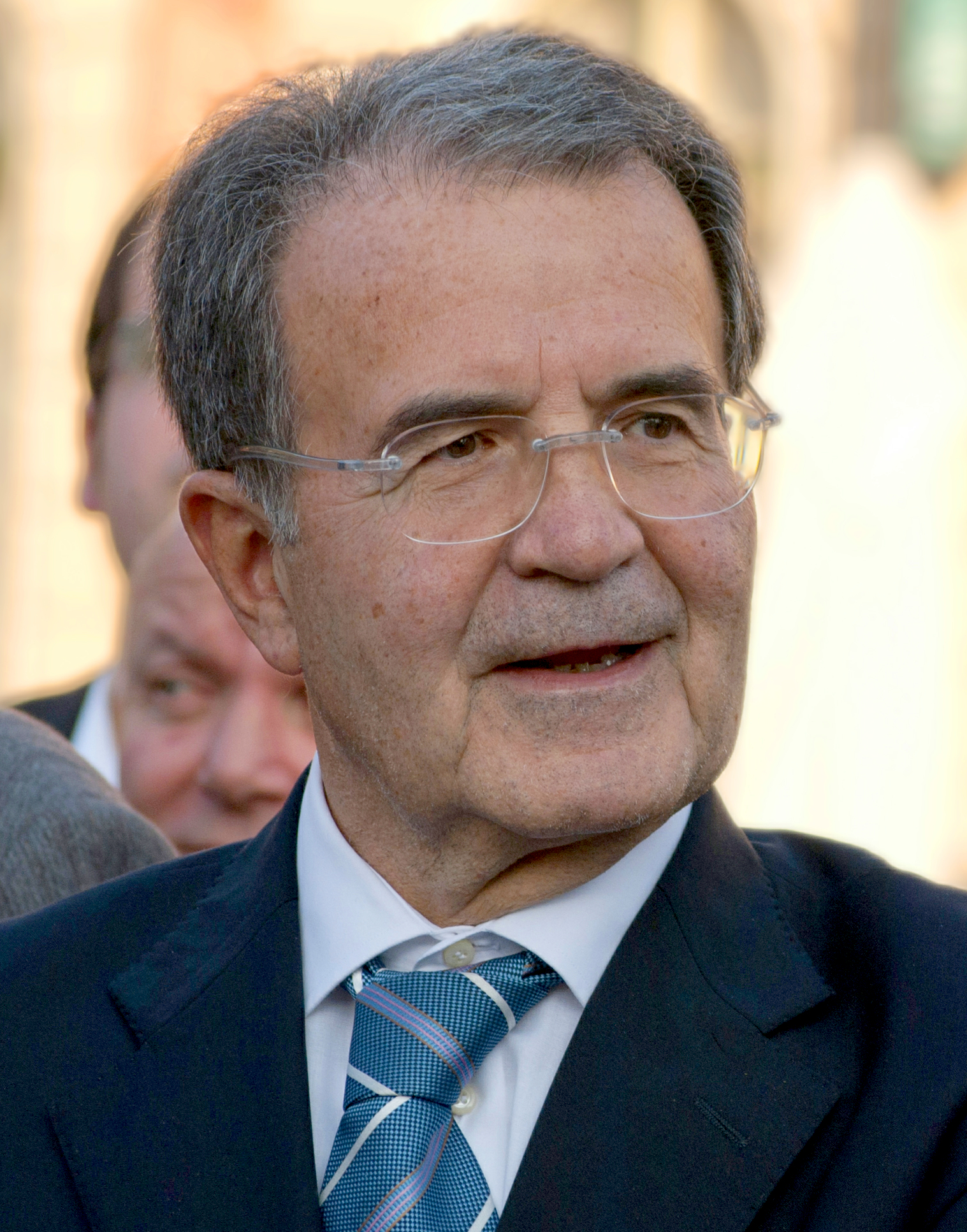
Prime Minister of Italy, Romano Prodi

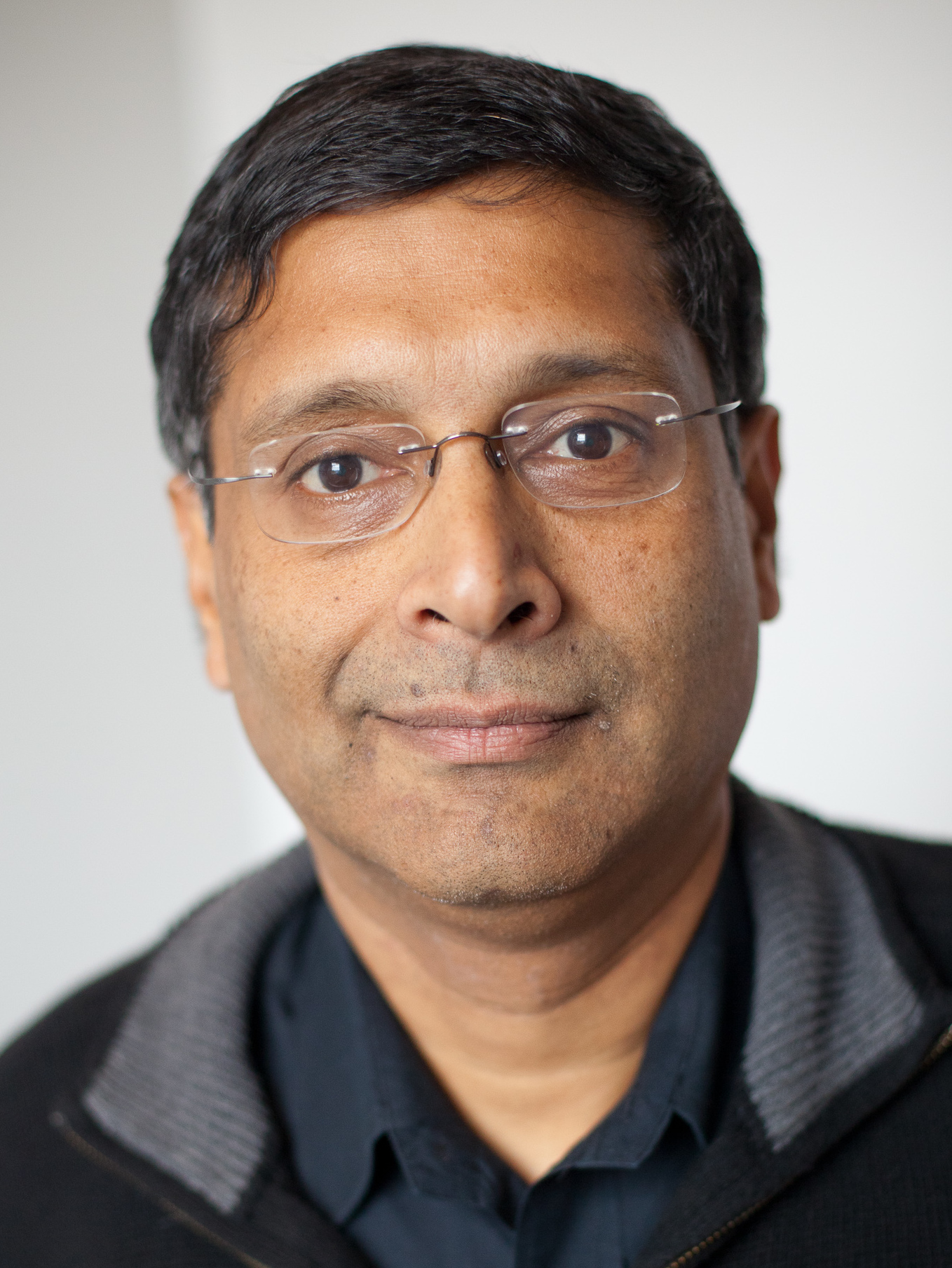
CEA of India, Arvind Subramanian

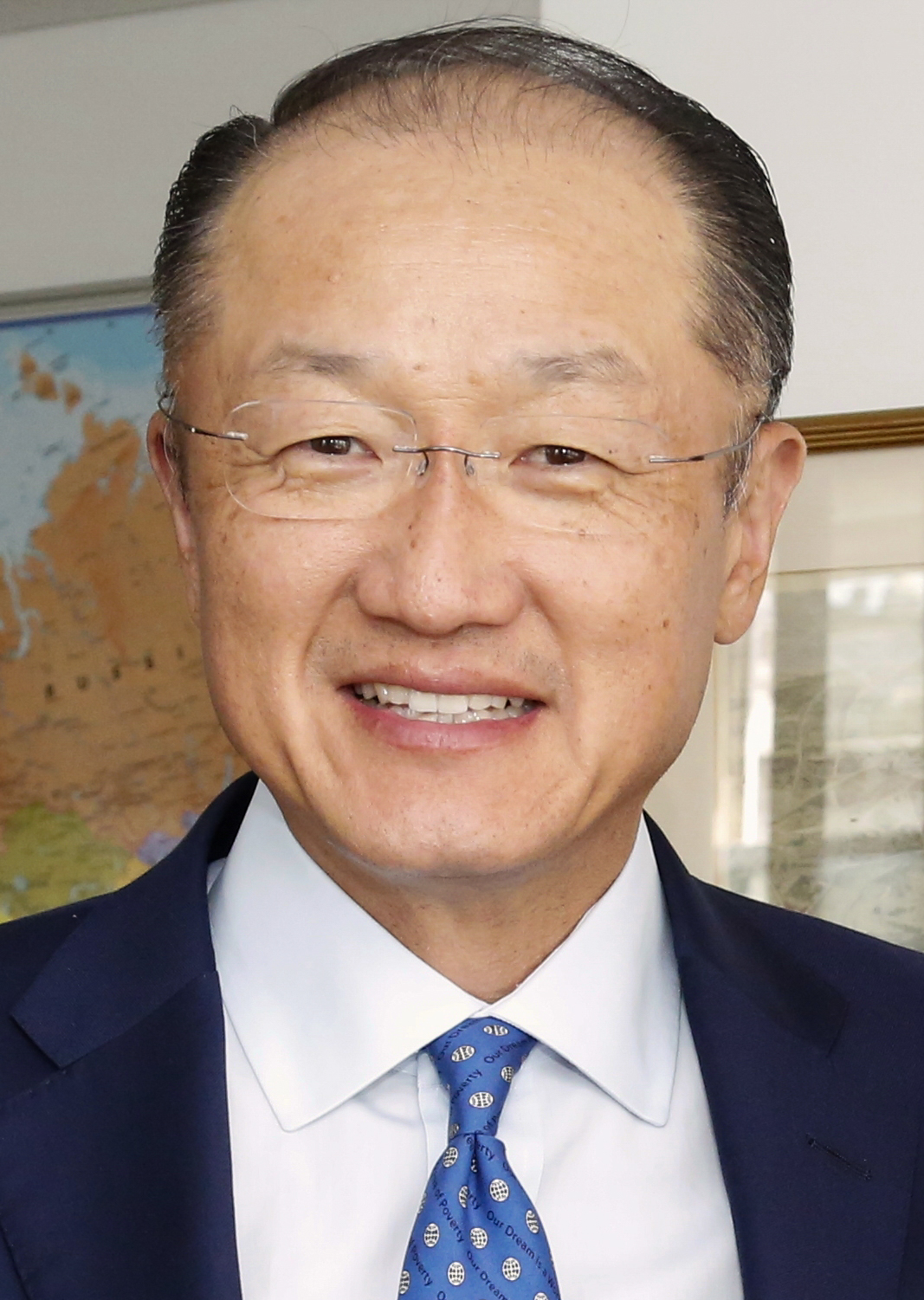
President of the World Bank, Jim Yong Kim

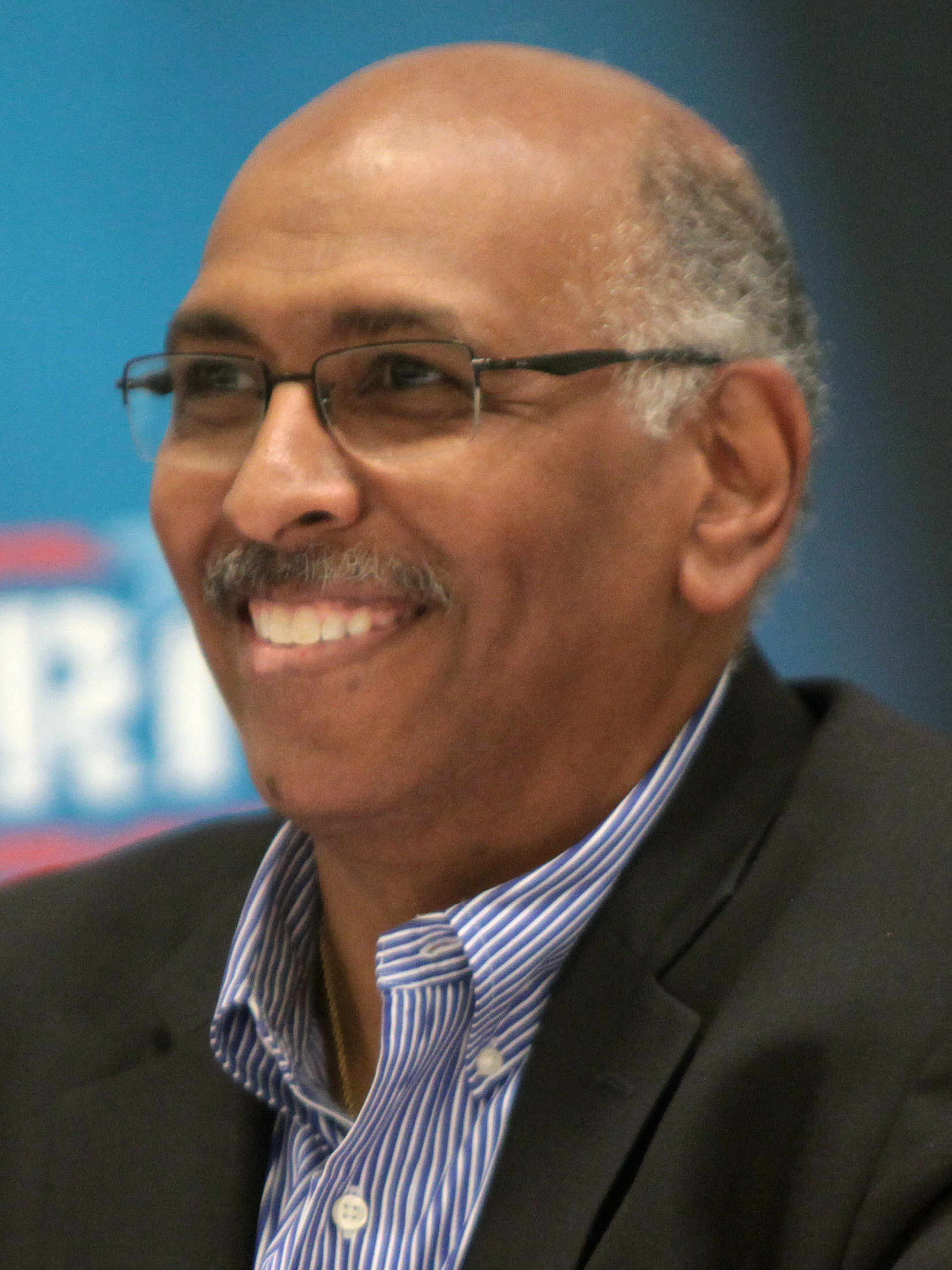
Politician Michael Steele

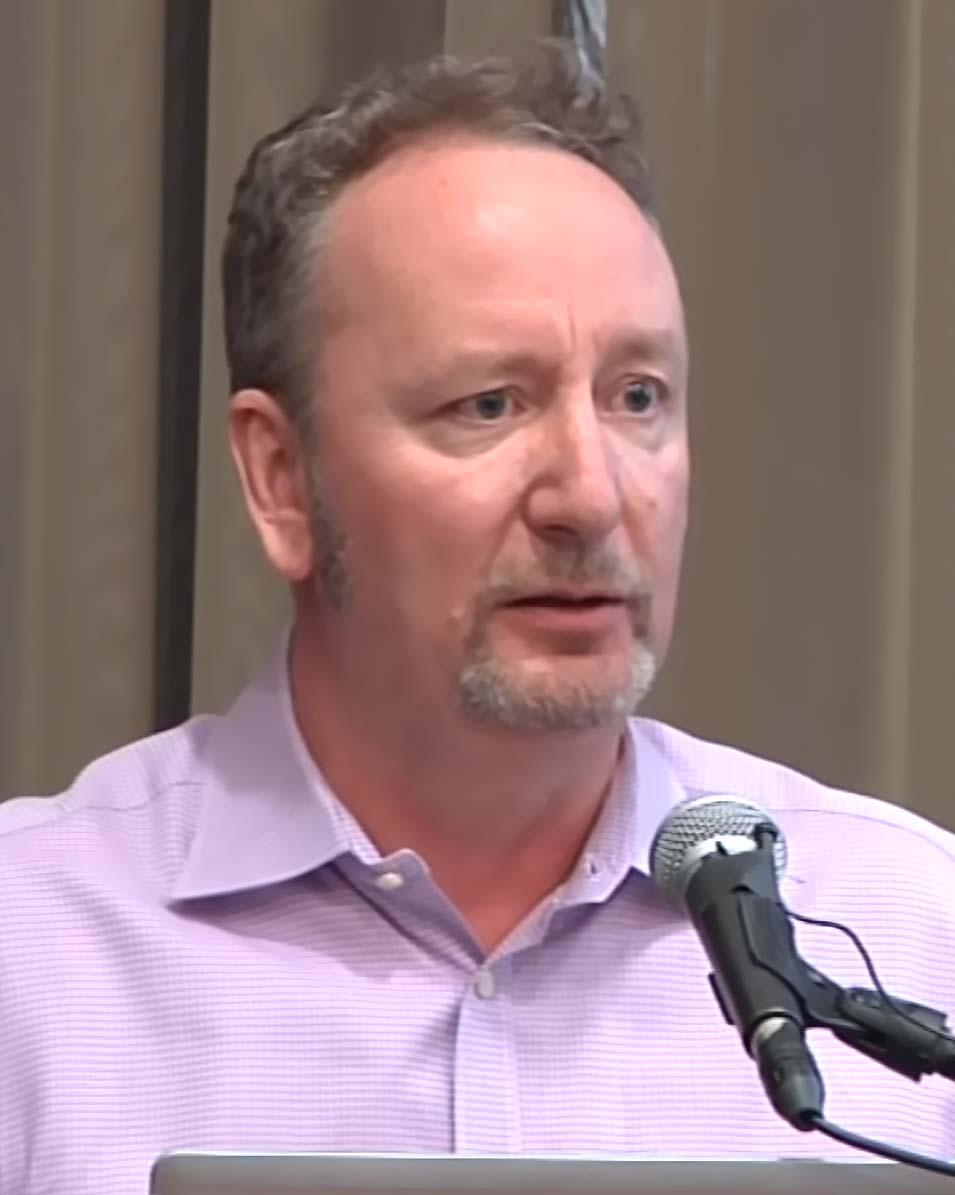
Political economist Mark Blyth

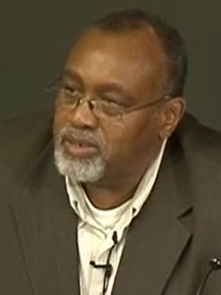
Economist Glenn Loury

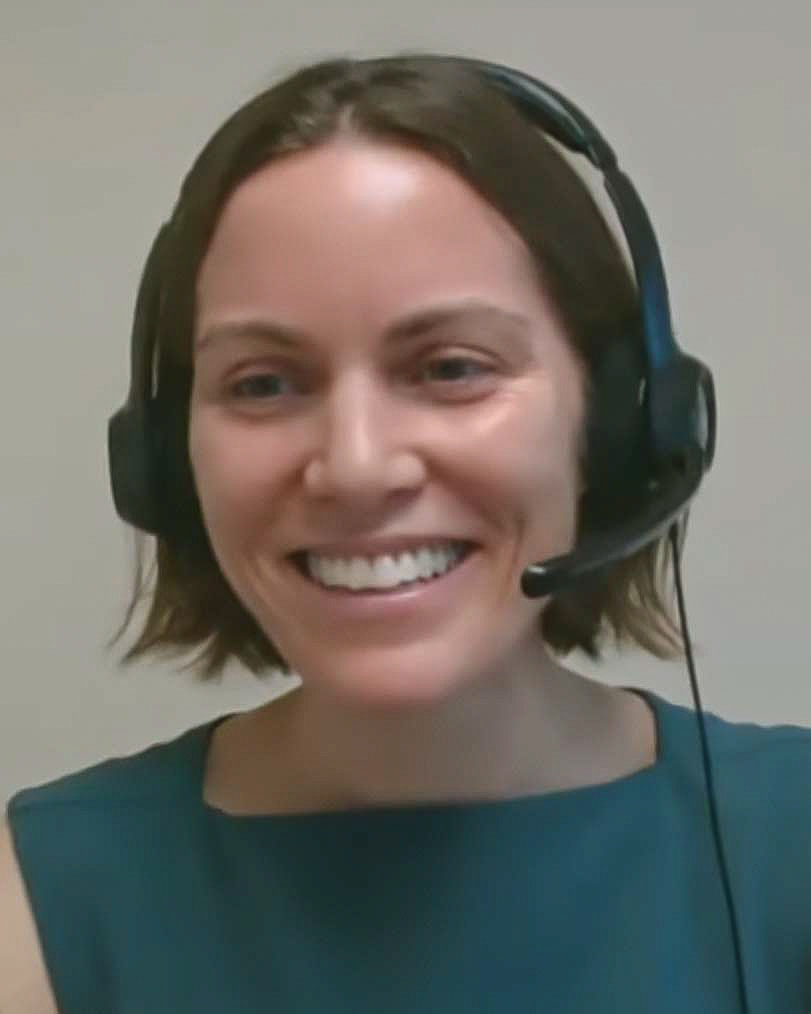
Economist Emily Oster

=== Directors ===
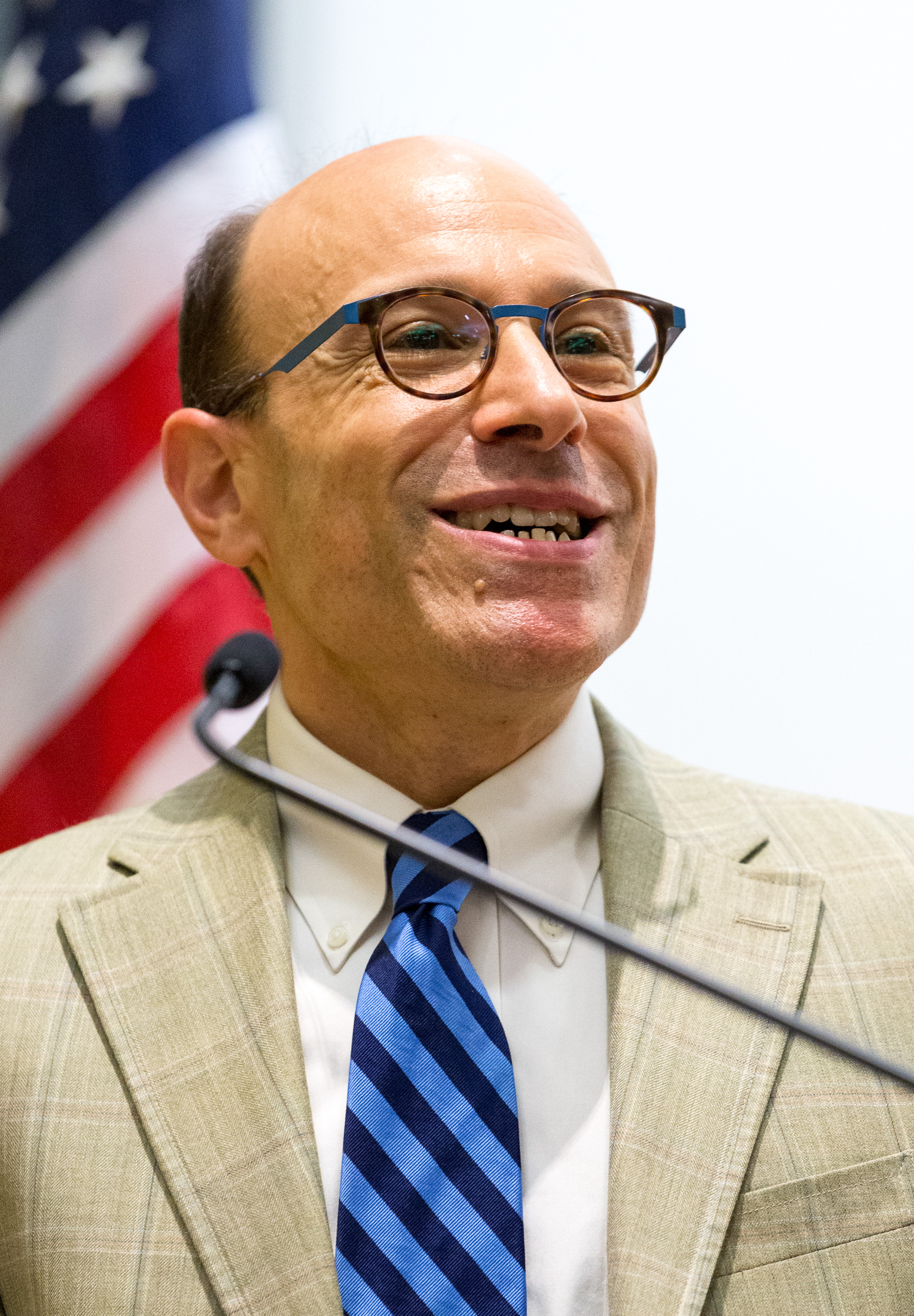
Edward Steinfeld

- Howard Swearer (1986–1991)
- Vartan Gregorian (1991–1994)
- Thomas J. Biersteker (1994–2006)
- Barbara Stallings (2006–2008)
- Michael D. Kennedy (2009–2011)
- Richard M. Locke (2013–2016)
- Edward Steinfeld (2016–2024)
- Wendy J. Schiller (2024–2025 as interim director)

=== Deans ===
- John N. Friedman (2025–)
