= Anarchy =

Society without rulers

Anarchy is a form of society without rulers. As a type of stateless society, it is commonly contrasted with states, which are polities that claim a monopoly on violence over a permanent territory. Beyond a lack of government, it can more precisely refer to societies that lack any form of authority or hierarchy. While viewed positively by anarchists, the primary advocates of anarchy, it is viewed negatively by advocates of statism, who see it in terms of social disorder.

The word "anarchy" was first defined by Ancient Greek philosophy, which understood it to be a corrupted form of direct democracy, where a majority of people exclusively pursue their own interests. This use of the word made its way into Latin during the Middle Ages, before the concepts of anarchy and democracy were disconnected from each other in the wake of the Atlantic Revolutions. During the Age of Enlightenment, philosophers began to look at anarchy in terms of the "state of nature"; a thought experiment used to justify various forms of hierarchical government. By the late 18th century, some philosophers began to speak in defence of anarchy, seeing it as a preferable alternative to existing forms of tyranny. This lay the foundations for the development of anarchism, which advocates for the creation of anarchy through decentralisation and federalism.

== Definition ==
As a concept, anarchy is commonly defined by what it excludes. Etymologically, anarchy is derived from the Greek: αναρχία, romanized: anarchia; where the prefix "αν" ("an") means "without" and the suffix "αρχία" ("archia") derives from "ruler" or "leader". Therefore, anarchy is fundamentally defined by the absence of rulers, leaders, or sovereigns.

While anarchy specifically represents a society without rulers, it can more generally refer to a stateless society, or a society without government. Anarchy is thus defined in direct contrast to the State, an institution that claims a monopoly on violence over a given territory. Anarchists such as Errico Malatesta have also defined anarchy more precisely as a society without authority, or hierarchy.

Anarchy is often defined synonymously as chaos or social disorder, reflecting the state of nature as depicted by Thomas Hobbes. By this definition, anarchy represents not only an absence of government but also an absence of governance. This connection of anarchy with chaos usually assumes that, without government, no means of governance exist and thus that disorder is an unavoidable outcome of anarchy. Sociologist Francis Dupuis-Déri has described chaos as a "degenerate form of anarchy", in which there is an absence, not just of rulers, but of any kind of political organization. He contrasts the "rule of all" under anarchy, which he considers to involve a process of consensus decision-making and self-governance, with the "rule of none" under chaos.

Since its conception, anarchy has been used in both a positive and negative sense, respectively describing a free society without coercion or a state of chaos.

== Conceptual development ==
=== Classical philosophy ===
When the word "anarchy" (Greek: αναρχία, romanized: anarchia) was first defined in ancient Greece, it initially had both a positive and negative connotation, respectively referring to spontaneous order or chaos without rulers. The latter definition was taken by the philosopher Plato, who criticised Athenian democracy as "anarchical", and his disciple Aristotle, who questioned how to prevent democracy from descending into anarchy. Ancient Greek philosophy initially understood anarchy to be a corrupted form of direct democracy, although it later came to be conceived of as its own form of political regime, distinct from any kind of democracy. According to the traditional conception of political regimes, anarchy results when authority is derived from a majority of people who pursue their own interests.

=== Post-classical development ===
During the Middle Ages, the word "anarchia" came into use in Latin, in order to describe the eternal existence of the Christian God. It later came to reconstitute its original political definition, describing a society without government.

Christian theologists came to claim that all humans were inherently sinful and ought to submit to the omnipotence of higher power, with the French Protestant reformer John Calvin declaring that even the worst form of tyranny was preferable to anarchy. The Scottish Quaker Robert Barclay also denounced the "anarchy" of libertines such as the Ranters. In contrast, radical Protestants such as the Diggers advocated for anarchist societies based on common ownership. Although following attempts to establish such a society, the Digger Gerard Winstanley came to advocate for an authoritarian form of communism.

During the 16th century, the term "anarchy" first came into use in the English language. It was used to describe the disorder that results from the absence of or opposition to authority, with John Milton writing of "the waste/Wide anarchy of Chaos" in Paradise Lost. Initially used as a pejorative descriptor for democracy, the two terms began to diverge following the Atlantic Revolutions, when democracy took on a positive connotation and was redefined as a form of elected, representational government.

=== Enlightenment philosophy ===
Political philosophers of the Age of Enlightenment contrasted the state with what they called the "state of nature", a hypothetical description of stateless society, although they disagreed on its definition. Thomas Hobbes considered the state of nature to be a "nightmare of permanent war of all against all". In contrast, John Locke considered it to be a harmonious society in which people lived "according to reason, without a common superior". They would be subject only to natural law, with otherwise "perfect freedom to order their actions".

In depicting the "state of nature" to be a free and equal society governed by natural law, Locke distinguished between society and the state. He argued that, without established laws, such a society would be inherently unstable, which would make a limited government necessary in order to protect people's natural rights. He likewise argued that limiting the reach of the state was reasonable when peaceful cooperation without a state was possible. His thoughts on the state of nature and limited government ultimately provided the foundation for the classical liberal argument for laissez-faire.

==== Kant's thought experiment ====
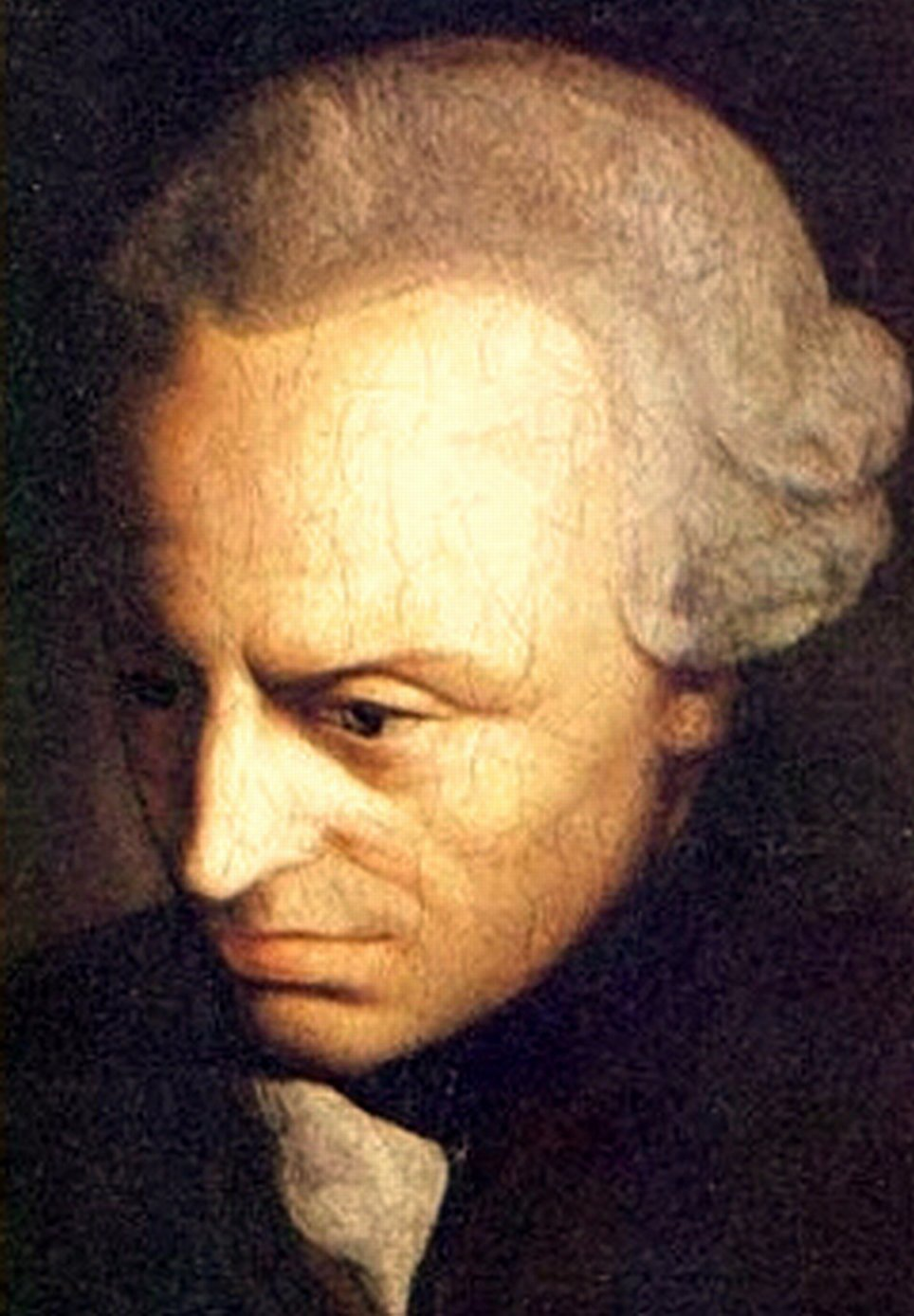
German idealist philosopher Immanuel Kant, who looked at anarchy as a thought experiment to justify government

Immanuel Kant defined "anarchy", in terms of the "state of nature", as a lack of government. He discussed the concept of anarchy in order to question why humanity ought to leave the state of nature behind and instead submit to a "legitimate government". In contrast to Thomas Hobbes, who conceived of the state of nature as a "war of all against all" which existed throughout the world, Kant considered it to be only a thought experiment. Kant believed that human nature drove people to not only seek out society but also to attempt to attain a superior hierarchical status.

While Kant distinguished between different forms of the state of nature, contrasting the "solitary" form against the "social", he held that there was no means of distributive justice in such a circumstance. He considered that, without law, a judiciary and means for law enforcement, the danger of violence would be ever-present, as each person could only judge for themselves what is right without any form of arbitration. He thus concluded that human society ought to leave the state of nature behind and submit to the authority of a state. Kant argued that the threat of violence incentivises humans, by the need to preserve their own safety, to leave the state of nature and submit to the state. Based on his "hypothetical imperative", he argued that if humans desire to secure their own safety, then they ought to avoid anarchy. But he also argued, according to his "categorical imperative", that it is not only prudent but also a moral and political obligation to avoid anarchy and submit to a state. Kant thus concluded that even if people did not desire to leave anarchy, they ought to as a matter of duty to abide by universal laws.

Kant also gave a short definition of anarchy in contrast to other forms of society:

“Anarchy is law and freedom without force. Despotism is law and force without freedom. Barbarism force without freedom and law. Republicanism is force with freedom and law.”

==== Defense of the state of nature ====
In contrast, Edmund Burke's 1756 work A Vindication of Natural Society, argued in favour of anarchist society in a defense of the state of nature. Burke insisted that reason was all that was needed to govern society and that "artificial laws" had been responsible for all social conflict and inequality, which led him to denounce the church and the state. Burke's anti-statist arguments preceded the work of classical anarchists and directly inspired the political philosophy of William Godwin.

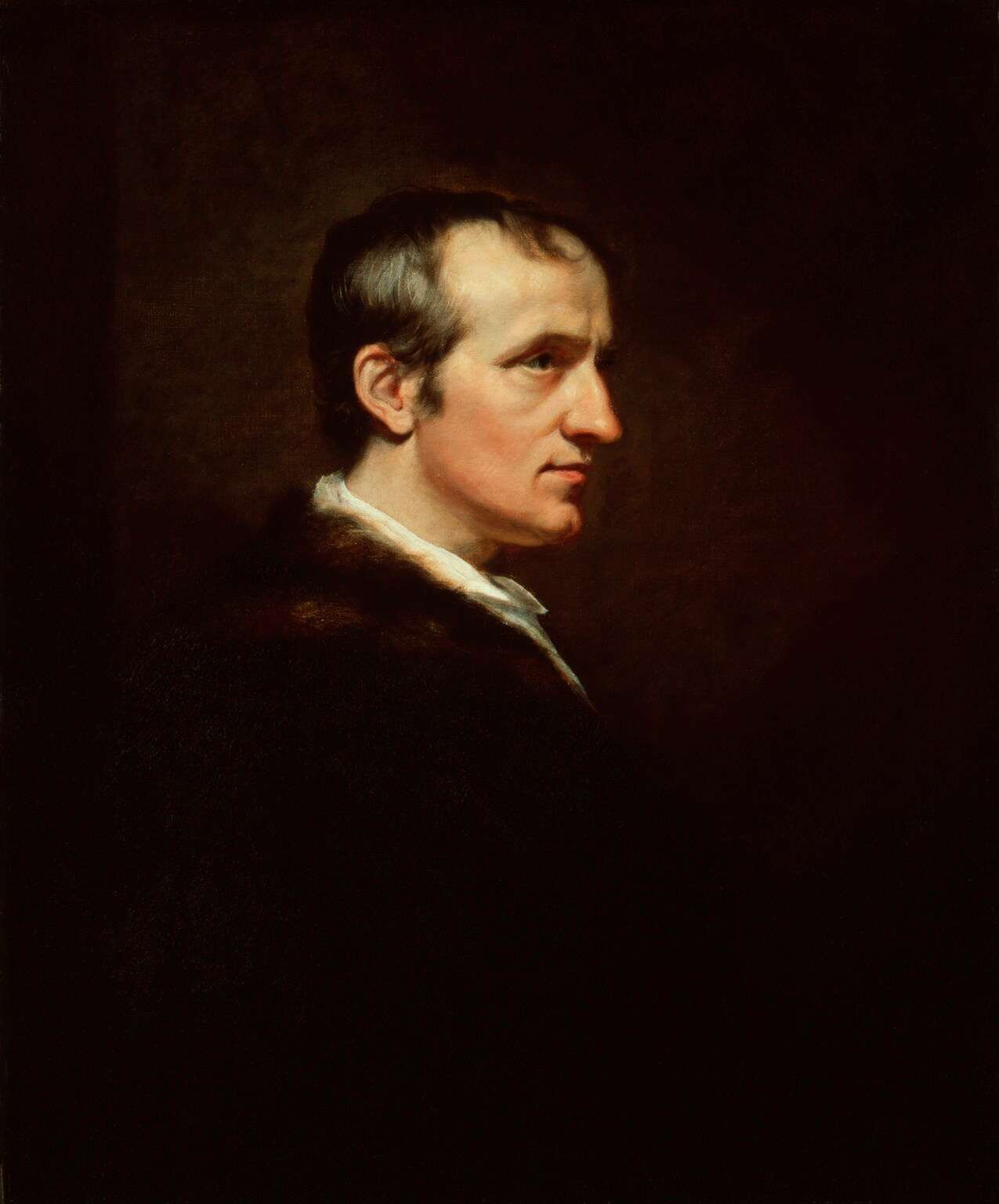
English political philosopher William Godwin, an early proponent of anarchy as a political regime

In his 1793 book Political Justice, Godwin proposed the creation of a more just and free society by abolishing government, concluding that order could be achieved through anarchy. Although he came to be known as a founding father of anarchism, Godwin himself mostly used the word "anarchy" in its negative definition, fearing that an immediate dissolution of government without any prior political development would lead to disorder. Godwin held that the anarchy could be best realised through gradual evolution, by cultivating reason through education, rather than through a sudden and violent revolution. But he also considered transitory anarchy to be preferable to lasting despotism, stating that anarchy bore a distorted resemblance to "true liberty" and could eventually give way to "the best form of human society".

This positive conception of anarchy was soon taken up by other political philosophers. In his 1792 work The Limits of State Action, Wilhelm von Humboldt came to consider an anarchist society, which he conceived of as a community built on voluntary contracts between educated individuals, to be "infinitely preferred to any State arrangements". The French political philosopher Donatien Alphonse François, in his 1797 novel Juliette, questioned what form of government was best. He argued that it was passion, not law, that had driven human society forward, concluding by calling for the abolition of law and a return to a state of nature by accepting anarchy. He concluded by declaring anarchy to be the best form of political regime, as it was law that gave rise to tyranny and anarchic revolution that was capable of bringing down bad governments. After the American Revolution, Thomas Jefferson suggested that a stateless society might lead to greater happiness for humankind and has been attributed the maxim "that government is best which governs least". Jefferson's political philosophy later inspired the development of individualist anarchism in the United States, with contemporary right-libertarians proposing that private property could be used to guarantee anarchy.

== Anarchist thought ==
=== Proudhon ===
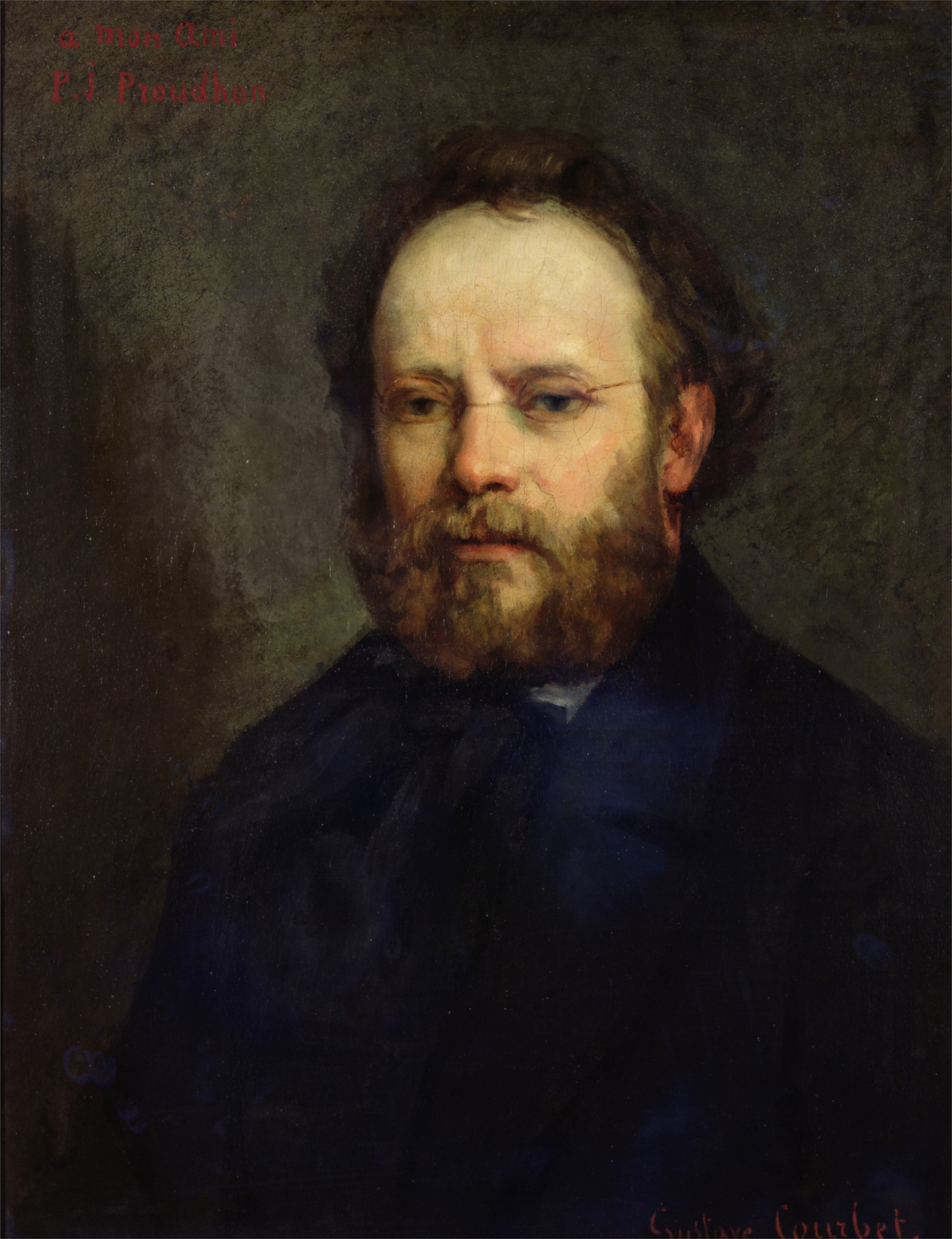
Pierre-Joseph Proudhon, the first person to self-identify with the term "anarchist" and one of the first to redefine "anarchy" in a positive sense

Pierre-Joseph Proudhon was the first person known to self-identify as an anarchist, adopting the label in order to provoke those that took anarchy to mean disorder. Proudhon was one of the first people to use the word "anarchy" (French: anarchie) in a positive sense, to mean a free society without government. To Proudhon, as anarchy did not allow coercion, it could be defined synonymously with liberty. In arguing against monarchy, he claimed that "the Republic is a positive anarchy ... it is the liberty that is the mother, not the daughter, of order." While acknowledging this common definition of anarchy as disorder, Proudhon claimed that it was actually authoritarian government and wealth inequality that were the true causes of social disorder. By counterposing this against anarchy, which he defined as an absence of rulers, Proudhon declared that "just as man seeks justice in equality, society seeks order in anarchy". Proudhon based his case for anarchy on his conception of a just and moral state of nature.

Proudhon posited federalism as an organizational form and mutualism as an economic form, which he believed would lead towards the end goal of anarchy. In his 1863 work The Federal Principle, Proudhon elaborated his view of anarchy as "the government of each man by himself," using the English term of "self-government" as a synonym for it. According to Proudhon, under anarchy, "all citizens reign and govern" through direct participation in decision-making. He proposed that this could be achieved through a system of federalism and decentralisation, in which every community is self-governing and any delegation of decision-making is subject to immediate recall. He likewise called for the economy to be brought under industrial democracy, which would abolish private property. Proudhon believed that all this would eventually lead to anarchy, as individual and collective interests aligned and spontaneous order is achieved.

Proudhon thus came to be known as the "father of anarchy" by the anarchist movement, which emerged from the libertarian socialist faction of the International Workingmen's Association (IWA). Until the establishment of IWA in 1864, there had been no anarchist movement, only individuals and groups that saw anarchy as their end goal.

=== Bakunin ===
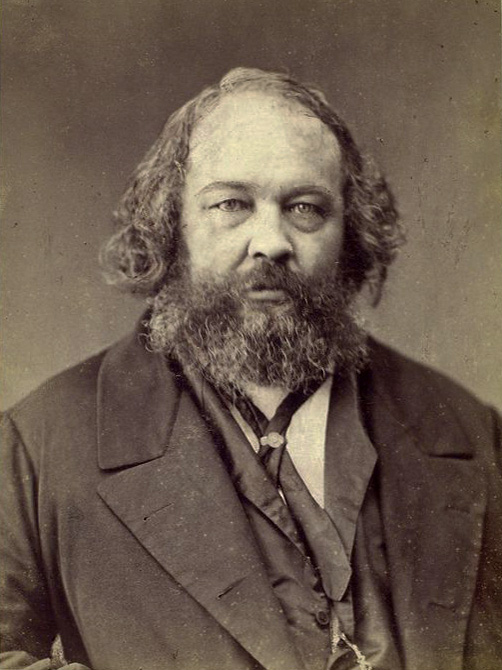
Mikhail Bakunin, who infused the term "anarchy" with simultaneous positive and negative definitions

One of Proudhon's keenest students was the Russian revolutionary Mikhail Bakunin, who adopted his critiques of private property and government, as well as his views on the desirability of anarchy. During the Revolutions of 1848, Bakunin wrote of his hopes of igniting a revolutionary upheaval in the Russian Empire, writing to the German poet Georg Herwegh that "I do not fear anarchy, but desire it with all my heart". Although he still used the negative definition of anarchy as disorder, he nevertheless saw the need for "something different: passion and life and a new world, lawless and thereby free."

Bakunin popularised "anarchy" as a term, using both its negative and positive definitions, in order to respectively describe the disorderly destruction of revolution and the construction of a new social order in the post-revolutionary society. Bakunin envisioned the creation of an "International Brotherhood", which could lead people through "the thick of popular anarchy" in a social revolution. Upon joining the IWA, in 1869, Bakunin drew up a programme for such a Brotherhood, in which he infused the word "anarchy" with a more positive connotation. He declared: "We do not fear anarchy, we invoke it. For we are convinced that anarchy, meaning the unrestricted manifestation of the liberated life of the people, must spring from liberty, equality, the new social order, and the force of the revolution itself against the reaction."

== Contemporary debates ==
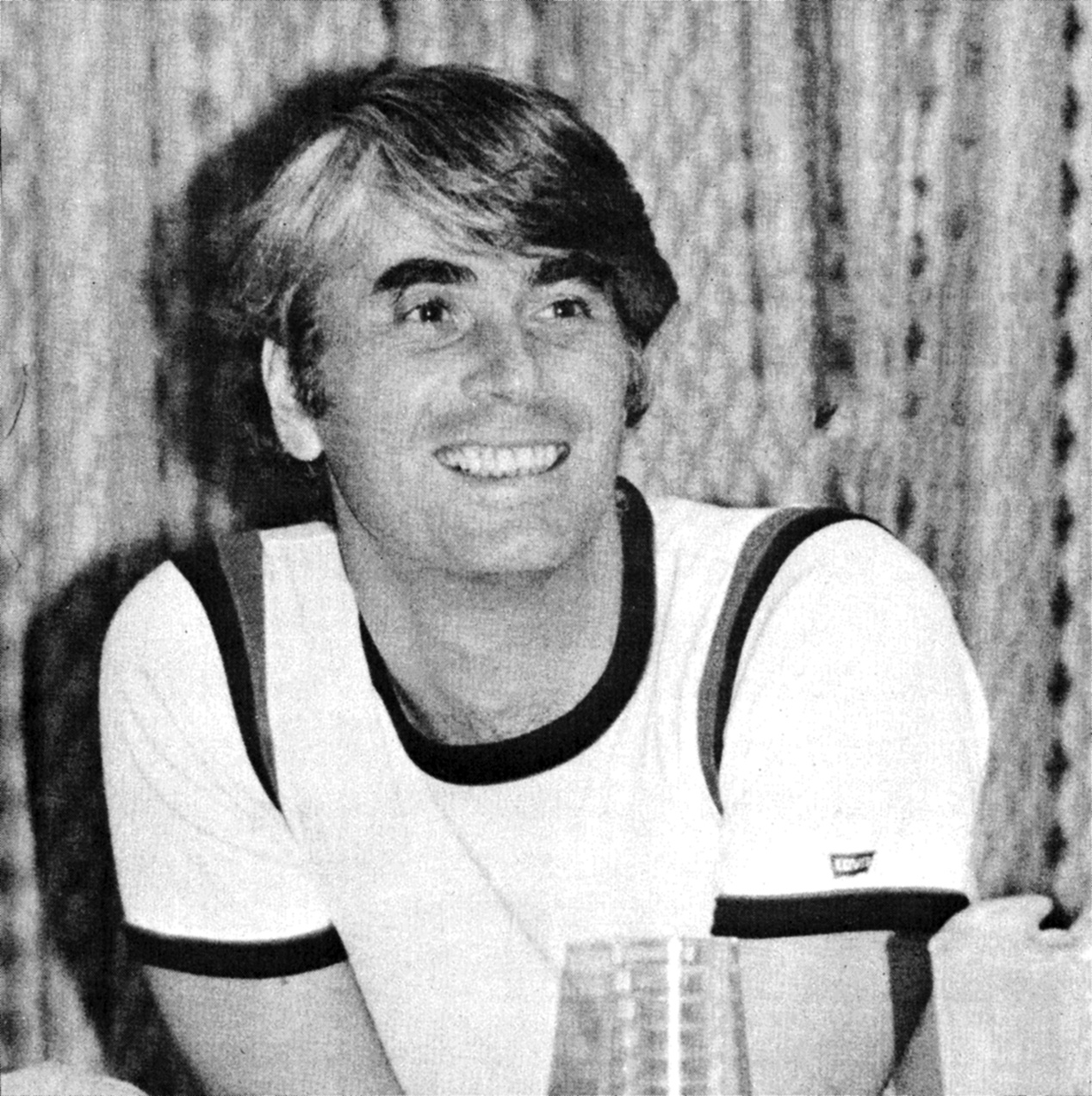
Robert Nozick, whose 1974 work Anarchy, State, and Utopia spurred contemporary debates on the viability of anarchy

By the early 1970s, widespread civil unrest had spurred the re-emergence of anarchy as a topic of discussion and study. The viability of anarchy increasingly became a subject of research, including by those that disregarded it as undesirable. Discussions of the viability of anarchy gained traction in academic circles following the publication of American political philosopher Robert Nozick's 1974 work Anarchy, State, and Utopia. Nozick issued a challenge to mainstream political philosophy, which had become preoccupied with the question of how a state should be organised; he questioned how the existence of the state can be justified and whether anarchy was a viable alternative. Nozick suggested that anarchism be examined by political philosophy, but himself would end up advocating for a minimal state that upheld human rights, instead of complete anarchy.

Public choice economists of the time, such as James M. Buchanan and Gordon Tullock, also explored anarchy's viability as a means to maintain social order, but came to characterise it in terms of lawlessness and violent social disorder. In his 1976 work Anarchy and Co-operation, American political scientist Michael Taylor argued that social order exists in counter-position to the state; and in his 1982 Community, Anarchy, and Liberty, he posited that anarchy could only exist in a stable form by maintaining social equality. In 1977, British political scientist Hedley Bull published his work The Anarchical Society, which proposed that international relations between states existed in a kind of anarchy, without a higher authority to mediate between them.

== See also ==
- Anti-authoritarianism
- Criticisms of electoral politics
- Libertarian socialism
- List of anarchist organizations
- Outline of anarchism
- Power vacuum
- Rebellion
- Relationship anarchy
- State of nature

== Bibliography ==
- Amster, Randall (2018). "Anti-Hierarchy". In Franks, Benjamin; Jun, Nathan; Williams, Leonard (eds.). Anarchism: A Conceptual Approach. Routledge. pp. 15–27. ISBN 978-1-138-92565-6. LCCN 2017044519.
- Bell, Tom W. (2020). "The Forecast for Anarchy". In Chartier, Gary; Van Schoelandt, Chad (eds.). The Routledge Handbook of Anarchy and Anarchist Thought. New York: Routledge. pp. 309–324. doi:10.4324/9781315185255-22. ISBN 9781315185255. S2CID 228898569.
- Boettke, Peter J.; Candela, Rosolino A. (2020). "The Positive Political Economy of Analytical Anarchism". In Chartier, Gary; Van Schoelandt, Chad (eds.). The Routledge Handbook of Anarchy and Anarchist Thought. New York: Routledge. pp. 222–234. doi:10.4324/9781315185255-15. ISBN 9781315185255. S2CID 228898569.
- Chartier, Gary; Van Schoelandt, Chad (2020). "Introduction". In Chartier, Gary; Van Schoelandt, Chad (eds.). The Routledge Handbook of Anarchy and Anarchist Thought. New York: Routledge. pp. 1–12. doi:10.4324/9781315185255. ISBN 9781315185255. S2CID 228898569.
- Davis, Lawrence (2019). "Individual and Community". In Adams, Matthew S.; Levy, Carl (eds.). The Palgrave Handbook of Anarchism. London: Palgrave Macmillan. pp. 47–70. doi:10.1007/978-3-319-75620-2_3. ISBN 978-3319756196. S2CID 158605651.
- Dupuis-Déri, Francis (2010). "Anarchy in Political Philosophy". In Jun, Nathan J.; Wahl, Shane (eds.). New Perspectives on Anarchism. Rowman & Littlefield. pp. 9–24. ISBN 978-0-7391-3240-1. LCCN 2009015304.
- Graham, Robert (2019). "Anarchism and the First International". In Adams, Matthew S.; Levy, Carl (eds.). The Palgrave Handbook of Anarchism. London: Palgrave Macmillan. pp. 325–342. doi:10.1007/978-3-319-75620-2_19. ISBN 978-3319756196. S2CID 158605651.
- Marshall, Peter H. (2008) [1992]. Demanding the Impossible: A History of Anarchism. London: Harper Perennial. ISBN 978-0-00-686245-1. OCLC 218212571.
- McKay, Iain (2018). "Organisation". In Franks, Benjamin; Jun, Nathan; Williams, Leonard (eds.). Anarchism: A Conceptual Approach. Routledge. pp. 115–128. ISBN 978-1-138-92565-6. LCCN 2017044519.
- McLaughlin, Paul (2007). Anarchism and Authority: A Philosophical Introduction to Classical Anarchism. Aldershot: Ashgate Publishing. ISBN 978-0-7546-6196-2. LCCN 2007007973.
- Morris, Christopher W. (2020). "On the Distinction Between State and Anarchy". In Chartier, Gary; Van Schoelandt, Chad (eds.). The Routledge Handbook of Anarchy and Anarchist Thought. New York: Routledge. pp. 39–52. doi:10.4324/9781315185255-3. ISBN 9781315185255. S2CID 228898569.
- Prichard, Alex (2019). "Freedom". In Adams, Matthew S.; Levy, Carl (eds.). The Palgrave Handbook of Anarchism. London: Palgrave Macmillan. pp. 71–89. doi:10.1007/978-3-319-75620-2_4. hdl:10871/32538. ISBN 978-3319756196. S2CID 158605651.
- Sensen, Oliver (2020). "Kant on Anarchy". In Chartier, Gary; Van Schoelandt, Chad (eds.). The Routledge Handbook of Anarchy and Anarchist Thought. New York: Routledge. pp. 99–111. doi:10.4324/9781315185255-7. ISBN 9781315185255. S2CID 228898569.
