= Sensen =

Sensen may refer to:

- Sen-Sen, a type of breath freshener
- Datengoku Sensen, Ali Project's 26th single

== People ==
- Oliver Sensen, German philosopher
