= Tim Dunne =

British scholar of international relations

Timothy J. Dunne is a British scholar of international relations, currently serving as Provost and Senior Vice-President at Monash University. He is also an Emeritus Professor at the University of Queensland, where he was previously Deputy Provost and Dean of Humanities and Social Sciences, and was previously Provost and Senior Vice-President at the University of Surrey.

Dunne completed his undergraduate degree at the University of East Anglia in 1989, and received his MPhil and DPhil in International Relations from St Antony's College, Oxford. Before his move to the University of Queensland, he was Professor of International Relations at the University of Exeter where he served as Dean of the College of Social Sciences.

As a theorist, Dunne has written on many paradigms, but his primary theoretical interest is in the English school. He has served as an associate editor for several journals, including the Review of International Studies (1998-2002), the International Journal of Human Rights (2000-2004), and was an editor of the European Journal of International Relations. (2009-2013)

His theoretical research interests connect to an applied agenda. He has published widely on human rights, on foreign policy (with particular reference to the United Kingdom), on the changing dynamics of world order after 9/11, and on global responsibility for the protection of human rights. He writes for UK and international media, including The Guardian and The Conversation. Latterly he has published occasional commentaries on higher education including articles in The Times Higher.

He is an elected Fellow of the Academy of Social Sciences, Australia; and serves on the board of Farnborough College of Technology.

== Selected publications ==
=== Books ===
- Tim Dunne, Richard Devetak eds, Rise of the International meets History (Oxford: OUP, 2024)
- Tim Dunne, Milja Kurki, Katarina Kuši', and Steve Smith eds., International Relations Theories: Discipline and Diversity (Oxford: OUP, 6th edition, 2024).
- Tim Dunne, Steve Smith, Amelia Hadfield, and Nicholas Kitchen eds., Foreign Policy: Theories, Actors, Cases (Oxford: OUP, 4th edition 2024).
- Tim Dunne and Ian Hall eds., revised edition of Herbert Butterfield and Martin Wright, eds., Diplomatic Investigations: Essays on the Theory of International Politics (Oxford: OUP, 2019)
- Tim Dunne, Christian Reus-Smit eds., The Globalization of International Society (Oxford: OUP, 2017)
- Tim Dunne, Alex Bellamy eds., The Oxford Handbook of the Responsibility to Protect (Oxford: OUP, 2016)
- Tim Dunne and Ken Booth, Terror in our Time (London: Routledge, 2012)
- Tim Dunne, Milja Kurki, Steve Smith eds., International Relations Theories: Discipline and Diversity (Oxford: OUP, 2nd edition, 2010).
- Tim Dunne and Ken Booth eds., Worlds in Collision: Terror and the Future of Global Order (London Palgrave-Macmillan, 2002).
- Tim Dunne and Nicholas J. Wheeler eds., Human Rights in Global Politics (Cambridge: Cambridge University Press, 1999).
- Tim Dunne, Michael Cox, Ken Booth eds., The Eighty Years’ Crisis: International Politics, 1919-1999 (Cambridge: CUP, 1999).
- Tim Dunne, Inventing International Society: A History of the English School (London and New York: Macmillan, 1998).

=== Significant articles ===
- Dunne, Tim and Hall, Ian (2023). ""The English School" in Thomas Weiss and Riordan Wilkinson eds". International Organization and Global Governance. 3rd ed: 144-154. doi:10.4324/9781003266365. ISBN 978-1-003-26636-5.
- Duncome, Constance and Dunne, Tim (2019). "After liberal world order". International Affairs. 91 (1): 25-42. doi:10.1093/ia/iix234.
- Dunne, Tim and Gifkins, Jess (2011). "Libya and the state of intervention" (PDF). Australian Journal of International Affairs. 65 (5): 515-529. doi:10.1080/10357718.2011.613148.
- Koivisto, Marjo and Dunne, Tim (2010). "Crisis, What Crisis? Liberal Order Building and World Order Conventions". Millennium: Journal of International Studies. 38 (3): 615–640. doi:10.1177/0305829810363509. S2CID 145591607.
- Dunne, Tim (2009). "Liberalism, International Terrorism, and Democratic Wars". International Relations. 23: 107–114. doi:10.1177/0047117808104156. S2CID 54891925.
- Dunne, Tim (2008). "Good citizen Europe". International Affairs. 84: 13–28. doi:10.1111/j.1468-2346.2008.00686.x.
- Dunne, Tim (2007). "'The Rules of the Game are Changing': Fundamental Human Rights in Crisis After 9/11". International Politics. 44 (2–3): 269–286. doi:10.1057/palgrave.ip.8800188. S2CID 145478465.
- Dunne, Tim (2005). "System, State and Society: How Does It All Hang Together?1". Millennium: Journal of International Studies. 34: 157–170. doi:10.1177/03058298050340011601. S2CID 143834464.
- Dunne, Tim; Wheeler, Nicholas (2004). "'We the Peoples': Contending Discourses of Security in Human Rights Theory and Practice". Child Neurology Open. 18 (1). doi:10.1177/004711780404173 (inactive 1 July 2025).
- Wheeler, Nicholas and Dunne, Tim (2001). "East Timor and the new humanitarian interventionism". International Affairs. 77 (4): 805-827. doi:10.1111/1468-2346.00220.
- Dunne, Tim (2004). "'When the shooting starts': Atlanticism in British security strategy". International Affairs. 80 (5): 893–909. doi:10.1111/j.1468-2346.2004.00424.x.
- Dunne, Tim (1995). "The Social Construction of International Society". European Journal of International Relations. 1 (3): 367-389. doi:10.1177/1354066195001003003.
- Wheeler, Nicholas; Dunne, Tim (1998). "Good International Citizenship: A Third Way for British Foreign Policy". International Affairs. 74 (4): 847-870. doi:10.1111/1468-2346.00048.

For a more complete list of publications refer to his Google Scholar page.
