= Agnes Headlam-Morley =

British historian and academic

Montague Burton Professor of International Relations University of Oxford
- In office 1948–1970
- Preceded by: Sir Llewellyn Woodward
- Succeeded by: Alastair Buchan

Personal details
- Born: 10 December 1902 Cambridge, Cambridgeshire, England
- Died: 21 February 1986 (aged 83)
- Party: Conservative
- Parent: Sir James Wycliffe Headlam-Morley (father)
- Education: Wimbledon High School
- Alma mater: Somerville College, Oxford

Agnes Headlam-Morley (10 December 1902 – 21 February 1986) was a British historian and academic. From 1948 to 1971, she was Montague Burton Professor of International Relations at the University of Oxford. Upon her appointment in October 1948, she became the first woman to be appointed to a chair at Oxford.

== Early life and education ==
Headlam-Morley was born on 10 December 1902 in Cambridge, Cambridgeshire, England, the only daughter of James Wycliffe Headlam, an academic and civil servant who was involved in drafting the Treaty of Versailles, and Else (née Sonntag), a musician and composer who was born and brought up in Germany. In 1918 her father changed his name to Headlam-Morley. Unlike others of her generation, she had "no secret sense of shame in being half-German".

Headlam-Morley was educated at Wimbledon High School, an all-girls private school in Wimbledon, London. She studied modern history at Somerville College, Oxford, graduating with a second class Bachelor of Arts (BA) degree in 1924. She then undertook research in modern European political history, and completed a Bachelor of Letters (BLitt) degree in 1926. As per tradition, her BA was promoted to a Master of Arts (Oxon) degree.

== Academic career ==
In 1932, Headlam-Morley was elected a Fellow of St Hugh's College, Oxford. Until her retirement, she was a tutor in history and politics at St Hugh's. In October 1948, she was appointed Montague Burton Professor of International Relations, which made her the first woman to be appointed a chair at the University of Oxford. She specialised in Anglo-German relations and diplomatic history. She belonged to the traditional school of international relations in which the subject was considered a subfield of history and not a social science. In 1971, she stepped down from the chair and retired from full-time academia.

In 1948, Headlam-Morley was made an honorary fellow of Somerville College, Oxford (her alma mater). She was made an honorary fellow of St Hugh's College, Oxford in 1970; the year before her retirement.

Headlam-Morley died on 21 February 1986, aged 83 years.

== Personal life ==
Headlam-Morley was a convert to Roman Catholicism and was received into the Catholic Church in 1948. She was a member of the Conservative Party, and stood as a candidate in the 1936 election to Durham County Council.
