= International Society =

International Society may refer to the following:

- International Society of Sculptors, Painters and Gravers
- English school of international relations theory
- International Society for Krishna Consciousness
- International Society for Contemporary Music
- International Society of Automation

== See also ==
- Category:International organizations
