= Christian Reus-Smit =

Christian Reus-Smit (born 8 August 1961) is Professor of International Relations (IR) at the University of Melbourne, Australia. He is an internationally renowned scholar in the field of IR. Reus-Smit's research focuses on the institutional nature and evolution of international orders, and he has published on widely on issues of international relations theory, international law, multilateralism, human rights, American power, and most recently, cultural diversity and international order. He is long-time editor (with Nicholas Wheeler and Evelyn Goh) of the Cambridge Studies in International Relations book series, and was a Founding Editor with Duncan Snidal and Alexander Wendt of the leading journal International Theory. His publications have been awarded many prizes, including the Susan Strange Best Book Prize (2014), the BISA Best Article Prize (2002), and the Northedge Prize (1992). In 2013-14 Professor Reus-Smit served as a Vice-President of the International Studies Association.

== Career ==
Reus-Smit was educated in Australia and the United States, receiving his B.A. and M.A. from La Trobe University in Melbourne. His M.A. dissertation concerned Australian foreign and security policy under during the Malcolm Fraser (1975–83) era. After completing his M.A. in the mid-1980s, he taught at La Trobe University. During the early-1990s, Reus-Smit undertook his PhD at Cornell University, along with other emerging constructivist scholars such as Audie Klotz and Richard Price. His doctoral dissertation was co-chaired by Peter J. Katzenstein and Henry Shue, and was later published as The Moral Purpose of the State in 1999 by Princeton University Press.

Reus-Smit returned to teach in Australia in 1995 and held positions as Lecturer and Senior Lecturer at Monash University before taking up a position as Senior Fellow at the Australian National University (ANU) in 2001, and was promoted to Professor in 2004. Reus-Smit served as Head of the Department of International Relations at the ANU from 2001 until 2010, and as Deputy Director of the ANU Research School of Pacific and Asian Studies (RSPAS) from 2006 to 2008. In September 2010 Reus-Smit moved to Florence to take up the Chair in International Relations at the European University Institute, and in 2013 was appointed to a Chair in International Relations at the University of Queensland, Australia. In 2024 Reus-Smit became Professor of International Relations at the University of Melbourne. He is a Fellow of the Academy of the Social Sciences in Australia.

== Contribution to International Relations Theory ==
Reus-Smit’s most significant contribution to the field is reflected in his answer to the question of the 'enigma of fundamental institutions,' laid out in 'The Moral Purpose of the State.' Here he analysed the different practices and norms of very different international societies, including ancient Greece, the Renaissance city-states and the modern states system. He argued that underpinning each is an assemblage of three elements that he refers to as 'constitutional structures.'

“Constitutional structures are coherent ensembles of intersubjective beliefs, principles and norms that perform two functions in ordering international societies: they define what constitutes a legitimate actor entitled to all the rights and privileges of statehood: and they define the basic parameters of rightful state action.”

These three intersubjective, normative elements are:

1. A hegemonic belief about the moral purpose of the state [centralised, autonomous political organisation]
2. An organising principle of sovereignty
3. A norm of pure procedural justice

This hegemonic belief about the moral purpose of the state is arguably the most important, because it provides the normative basis on which the other two develop. As Reus-Smit puts it: ‘historically different international societies, in which different ideals of legitimate statehood prevailed, have developed different institutional orders, with multilateral diplomacy and contractual international law only emerging in a world where liberal states, and their principles of governance, have been ascendent’.

Other early work explored the relationship between critical international theory and constructivism. One of the key arguments he presented in an early article he co-authored with Richard Price, "Dangerous liaisons? Critical international theory and constructivism", is that constructivism, in spite of its engagement with the mainstream 'on issues of interpretation and evidence, generalisations, alternative explanations and variation and comparability', remains compatible with critical international theory.

Since this early work Reus-Smit has published on a range of issues, most notably on the individual rights and the expansion of the modern international system, the nature and role of special responsibilities in world politics, international crises of legitimacy, the nature and limits of American power, and most recently, on the relationship between cultural diversity and international order.

== Publications ==
=== Books ===
- The Oxford Handbook of History and International Relations (Oxford University Press, 2023). Co-edited with Mlada Bukovansky, Edward Keene, and Maja Spanu.
- Culture and Order in World Politics (Cambridge University Press, 2020). Co-edited with Andrew Phillips.
- International Relations: A Very Short Introduction (Oxford University Press, 2020).
- On Cultural Diversity: International Theory in a World of Difference (Cambridge University Press, 2018).
- The Globalisation of International Society Co-edited with Tim Dunne (Oxford University Press, 2017).
- Individual Rights and the Making of the International System (Cambridge University Press, 2013).
- Special Responsibilities: Global Problems and American Power (Cambridge University Press, 2012). Co-authored with Mlada Bukovansky, Ian Clark, Robyn Eckersley, Richard Price, and Nicholas Wheeler.
- The Oxford Handbook of International Relations (Oxford: Oxford University Press, 2008). Co-edited with Duncan Snidal.
- International Crises of Legitimacy (Special Issue, International Politics, 2007). Co-edited with Ian Clark.
- American Power and World Order (Cambridge: Polity Press, 2004).
- The Politics of International Law Editor (Cambridge: Cambridge University Press, 2004).
- Theories of International Relations Coauthored with Scott Burchill, Andrew Linklater, Jacqui True, Matthew Patterson, and Richard Devetak (London: Palgrave, 2001, 2005, 2008 Editions).
- The Moral Purpose of the State (Princeton: Princeton University Press, 1999).
- Between Sovereignty and Global Governance Coedited with Albert Paolini and Anthony Jarvis. (London: Macmillan, 1998).

=== Selected articles ===
- 'Polymorphic Justice and the Crisis of International Order', International Affairs, 99 (1), 2023.
- 'Going Global: A Future for Australian International Relations', Australian Journal of International Affairs, 75 (6), 2021.
- 'The End of Global Pluralism?', European Journal of International Relations, 27 (4), 2021.
- 'Cultural Diversity and International Order', International Organization, 71 (4), 2017.
- 'Theory, History, and Great Transformations', International Theory, 8 (3), 2016.
- 'International Law and the Mediation of Culture, Ethics and International Affairs, 28 (1), 2014.
- 'The Concept of Intervention', Review of International Studies, 39 (4), 2013.
- 'Beyond Metatheory?', European Journal of International Relations, 19 (3), 2013.
- 'International Relations, Irrelevant? Don't Blame Theory', Millennium, 40 (3), 2012.
- 'Human Rights in a Global Ecumene', International Affairs, 87 (5), 2011.
- 'Struggles for Individual Rights and the Expansion of the International System', International Organization, 65 (2), 207–242, 2011.
- 'Reuniting Ethics and Social Science in International Relations', Ethics and International Affairs, 37 (2), 395–414, 2008. With Duncan Snidal.
- 'International Crises of Legitimacy', International Politics, 44 (2/3), 2007.
- ‘Liberal Hierarchy and the License to Use Force’, Review of International Studies, 31 (December 2005).
- 'Imagining Society: Constructivism and the English School', British Journal of Politics and International Relations, 4 (3), 487–509, 2002.
- 'Human Rights and the Social Construction of Sovereignty', Review of International Studies, 27 (4), 1–20, 2001. (Awarded the BISA Prize.)
- 'The Strange Death of Liberal International Theory', European Journal of International Law, 12 (3), 573–593, 2001.
- 'The Constitutional Structure of International Society and the Nature of Fundamental Institutions', International Organization, 51 (4), 1997.

== See also ==
- United States-Australia relations
