= Transgovernmentalism =

Transgovernmentalism is a theory of global governance. It accepts the continued existence of nation states but states that government functions can be delegated to intergovernmental bodies.

It describes a way of taking decisions, especially in the European Union. In a supranational entity, as the European Union is, it describes the way in which no government can be outvoted and thus have a decision imposed with which it would not agree.

«Intensive transgovernmentalism is used mainly in highly sensitive policy areas, where at least some member states wish to retain national sovereignty and do not want to risk the loss of control that the introduction of supranational features can involve. […] the main decision-takes are representatives of the member state governments; key decisions are taken by unanimity; and the formal powers of the EU's supranational institutions are limited.»

== See also ==
- Intergovernmentalism, Intergovernmental organization
- Liberal institutionalism
- New Medievalism
- Supranational union
