= Tatakau Shisho =

Japanese light novel series and its adaptations

- Cover of Tatakau Shisho volume 1 as published by Shueisha

戦う司書
- Genre: Adventure, fantasy
- Light novel
- Written by: Ishio Yamagata
- Illustrated by: Shigeki Maeshima
- Published by: Shueisha
- Imprint: Super Dash Bunko
- Original run: September 22, 2005 – January 22, 2010
- Volumes: 10
- Manga

Tatakau Shisho to Koisuru Bakudan
- Written by: Kokonotsu Shinohara
- Published by: Shueisha
- Magazine: Ultra Jump Egg
- Original run: March 19, 2008 – October 19, 2009
- Volumes: 3
- Anime television series

Tatakau Shisho: The Book of Bantorra
- Directed by: Toshiya Shinohara
- Produced by: Yoshiyuki Itō; Kōhei Kawase; Tetsurō Saitō; Kōji Kajita
- Written by: Mari Okada
- Music by: Yoshihisa Hirano
- Studio: David Production
- Licensed by: NA: Sentai Filmworks
- Original network: Animax, Bandai Channel, BS11
- English network: NA: Anime Network
- Original run: October 2, 2009 – April 2, 2010
- Episodes: 27

Tatakau Shisho (Japanese: 戦う司書; lit. "Armed Librarians") is a Japanese light novel series written by Ishio Yamagata and illustrated by Shigeki Maeshima. The series started with the release of the first volume on September 22, 2005, and by January 22, 2010, ten volumes had been published by Shueisha under its Super Dash Bunko label. A manga adaptation by Kokonotsu Shinohara was serialized in Shueisha's Internet-based manga magazine Ultra Jump Egg between March 2008 and October 2009. An anime adaptation, The Book of Bantorra, began airing in Japan on October 2, 2009. In 2012, the anime series was licensed for distribution in North America by Sentai Filmworks.

== Plot ==
In a world where deceased people turn into stone-like books that are stored in the labyrinthine Bantorra Library, anyone who touches such a book can glean into the past, observing the life of the person who died to create it. The Bantorra Library is maintained by the Armed Librarians, who are trained in combat and wield supernatural abilities. Their operations are overseen by the library's acting director, Hamyuts Meseta, a hardened killer herself. Their enemy is a globally active cult known as the Shindeki Church, led by the so-called True Men, who hold the fulfillment of their personal desires above all else. The story does not feature an obvious main protagonist, instead following a large number of characters, primarily members of the Armed Librarians. Beginning with their assault on a ship owned by the Shindeki Church carrying brainwashed slaves implanted with explosives, Tatakau Shisho chronicles the ongoing conflict between the members of the Bantorra Library and their enemies, alongside the fates of the various characters involved in it, past and present.

== Characters ==
=== Bantorra Library ===
Hamyuts Meseta (ハミュッツ=メセタ, Hamyuttsu Meseta)
Voiced by: Romi Park (Japanese); Shelley Calene-Black (English)
The acting director of the Bantorra Library. She usually wears a white button-down shirt (that is always unbuttoned at the top revealing her breasts) with a small bunny patch sewn on the right breast and a pair of black pants. She has an easy-going personality and a lust for battle; she is always searching for an opponent strong enough to kill her. She had a relationship with Mattalast in the past. Her main weapon is a sling (usually wrapped around her right wrist), which she uses to snipe enemies from a far distance with great precision and force. She can throw large objects, but usually uses small rocks or pebbles. The speed of those projectiles can reach five times the speed of sound. Her magic ability is "Sensory Fibres", which allows her to observe locations from afar. Her fibres, fully emitted, can reach approximately 50 kilometers, while the number of fibres emitted reaches over billions. According to Minth's Sacred Eyes ability, her main trait is self-loathing, her thoughts are void, and she wishes for love.
Mattalast Ballory (マットアラスト=バロリー, Mattoarasuto Barorī)
Voiced by: Toru Ohkawa (Japanese); David Wald (English)
First grade Armed Librarian, and one of the five strongest Armed Librarians. He usually wears a black tuxedo and bowler hat. He is an easy-going person and always known by people as a liar. He used to have a relationship with Hamyuts. His main weapons are guns. He bears a revolver and an anti-tank rifle. His magic ability is to see two seconds ahead in the future, which he can use to preemptively take action in the presence of the enemy. He is one of the few who knows the secret of Heaven and also protects it.
Mirepoc Finedel (ミレポック=ファインデル, Mirepokku Fainderu)
Voiced by: Miyuki Sawashiro (Japanese); Shannon Emerick (English)
Third grade Armed Librarian and is the instructor of Noloty. She was once a reserve officer of The Empire and was introduced by Hamyuts Meseta to join the Armed Librarians. She usually wears her uniform and is a strict person. Her main weapons are a sword and pistol. Due to her lack of combat proficiency she usually takes on a support role. Her magic ability is Telepathy; regardless of how far away a person is located, she can engage in telepathic communication with them-- as long as she knows their name and appearance. She is in love with Volken.
Volken Macmani (ヴォルケン=マクマーニ, Voruken Makumāni)
Voiced by: Yuichi Nakamura (Japanese); Greg Ayres (English)
A man in his early 20s. He always wears traditional Armed Librarian robes. He is very proud of being an Armed Librarian, and holds both himself and others to high standards. He is the adopted son of previous Acting Director Fhotona, who he loves and respects. His magic right, which he was born with, is the creation of illusions that take the form he decides; this ability is signified by his green hair. While using an illusion of himself as a distraction, he can attack with his personal weapons, iron rings with two blades built into them. These are referred to as "Macmani's Dancing Blades" because of how they dance and spin through the air. He can also walk or stand on them in mid-air, a tactic which requires great agility. Though he is only a third grade Armed Librarian, he is very skilled and could easily make his way to the top. However, when he discovered Hamyuts was the one who sank the Silver Smoke in Aro bay, his strong sense of justice drove him to rebel against her.
Volken believed the Armed Librarians existed for the sake of justice. When he discovered that the Shindeki Church was a branch of the Armed Librarians, and that Fhotona, who taught him the importance of justice, also knew about it, he was paralyzed by shock. In that moment, Hamyuts was able to catch him off-guard and kill him. During the final battle in Ruruta's non-entity entrails, Hamyuts uses her "Book Eating" power, summoning Volken to fight alongside the others.
Noloty Malche (ノロティ=マルチェ, Noroti Maruche)
Voiced by: Haruka Tomatsu (Japanese); Cynthia Martinez (English)
A trainee Armed Librarian. She is an expert in hand-to-hand combat. She is a joyful, outgoing person who doesn't like to kill people. She was born on an island near The Empire and was raised by her father, who was the head of the village. After her father died, she was thrown out of the village, and eventually became an Armed Librarian.
Ruruta Coozancoona (ルルタ=クーザンクーナ, Ruruta Kūzankūna)
Voiced by: Takahiro Sakurai (Japanese); Chris Patton (English)
The Director and founder of the Bantorra Library. His ability is "Tearless Ending", which causes snow to fall across the entire planet, putting humanity into an eternal slumber. Like Zatoh Rondohoon, he is a Book Eater, but his resolve allowed him to consume significantly more books (100,000).
Mokkania Fluru (モッカニア=フルール, Mokkania Furūru)
Voiced by: Akira Ishida (Japanese); David Matranga (English)
One of the strongest Armed Librarians, along with Hamyuts Meseta. He is a lonely man who is so strong that he fears his own power. During a war between the Bantorra Library and The Empire, he felt guilty after killing so many people, therefore he locked himself deep in the labyrinth beneath Bantorra Library. His magic ability is to control vast swarms of flesh-eating ants.
Ireia Kitty (イレイア=キティ, Ireia Kiti)
Voiced by: Akiko Takeguchi (Japanese); Marcy Bannor (English)
The oldest Armed Librarian, and one of the five strongest, her job is to instruct trainee Armed Librarians. Her kind and friendly personality has earned the trust and love of most of the Armed Librarians. She mainly fights hand-to-hand to make full use of her tremendous strength, which allows her to lift and/or throw large, heavy objects with ease. Ireia's magic ability enables her to control how things move through space-time, allowing her to speed up or slow down things. However, objects must be in her line of sight for them to be affected by her magic. She can also make herself completely invincible to damage by stopping time for herself, although doing so renders her unable to move an inch whilst doing so.
Chacoly Cocotte (チャコリー=ココット, Chakorī Kokotto)
Voiced by: Ai Nonaka (Japanese); Brittney Karbowski (English)
A childhood friend of Hamyuts. She is also known as "The Violet Sinner". Her ability is "Soul Transference", an ability that is similar to Mirepoc's telepathy but of higher level, as it can control the minds of people by injecting part of her soul.
Fhotona Badgammon (フォトナ=バードギャモン, Fotona Bādogyamon)
Voiced by: Tooru Furusawa (Japanese); Illich Guardiola (English)
The previous Acting Director, serving directly before Hamyuts, and Volken's mentor. As Hamyuts rises through the ranks of the Armed Librarians, he orders Mattalast to murder her while the two of them are on a mission to kill Hiza the traitor. He fears she will become too powerful, far surpassing everyone in the Library.
Makia Dekishart (マキア=デキシアート, Makia Dekishiāto)
Voiced by: Masaki Terasoma (Japanese); John Gremillion (English)
The Acting Director of Bantorra Library who served three terms before Hamyuts Meseta. After being asked by "Heaven" (Ruruta Coozancoona) to find a way to kill him, Makia created Chacoly and Hamyuts for that purpose. He seemed very emotionally troubled by his own actions afterward, and died as an old man doing harsh physical labor to punish himself.
Enlike Bishile / Zatoh Rondohoon
Voiced by: Hirofumi Nojima (Japanese); Josh Grelle (English) (Enlike Bishile)
Voiced by: Kenji Hamada (Japanese); Andrew Love (English) (Zatoh Rondohoon)
The original Enlike Bishile was a young Meat who was led into the false belief that killing others would make him happy, on a transport ship, he catches the attention of Ganbanzel and is chosen when he learns that he has a strong desire to smile once more. Zatoh Rondohoon is a Book Eater, who absorbed Enlike's book. Unlike many others, Enlike's soul managed to take control of Zatoh's body for an extended period and used this as a chance to emerge and put an end to Zatoh's control.

=== Shindeki Church ===
Kachua Binhas (カチュア=ビーインハス, Kachua Bīinhasu)
Voiced by: Tamio Ooki (Japanese); John Swasey (English)
The leader of the Shindeki Church, known as the "Governor of Paradise". His magic ability is to bend light and he uses this to hide his face. It is revealed by Hamyuts that the Governor of Paradise is chosen from among the ranks of the Armed Librarians and the war between the Church and the Library is all an act and, in truth, they're actually working alongside each other to protect the secret of Heaven which is passed from Acting Director to Acting Director.
Shiron Byacornise
Voiced by: Ayako Kawasumi (Japanese); Allison Sumrall (English)
Known as "The Ever-Laughing Witch", and was a girl who lived in the Ronar Dukedom, an era three centuries before the current timeline. She was the person who found the cure for Dragon Pneumonia, a deadly and highly contagious disease. She has the ability to look far into the future. It is because of this ability that she fell in love with Colio Tonies who was born three centuries after her. She wields the "Ever-Laughing Demon Sword, Shlamuffen" that was bestowed upon her by the King (who believes it is a weapon worthy of the country's savior), and is thus idolized as the nation's "Ever-Laughing Saint".

=== Meats ===
Colio Tonies (コリオ=トニス, Korio Tonisu)
Voiced by: Miyu Irino (Japanese); Clint Bickham (English)
A Meat, who doesn't consider himself human, and has been implanted with a bomb and sent out by the Shindeki Church to kill Hamyuts Meseta. His story focuses on the collection of various fragments of a book depicting the tragic tale of a young woman named Shiron Byacornise, possessing the ability to see the future, and the love story enfolding between them, crossing even the boundaries of time.
Olivia Litlet / Renas Fluru
Voiced by: Sayaka Oohara (Japanese); Luci Christian (English)
The original Olivia Litlet was a young Meat, shown to have more clout and leadership among the others, with an agenda of their own. However, Renas Fluru is Mokkania's mother who had died twenty years ago. Due to Olivia's resemblance to Renas, she was later used by Winkeny Bize and had Renas's memories implanted in her, so as to have her assume the identity of Mokkania's mother, taking over Renas's body. Although later, Olivia regained control of her body with Renas's personality a little voice in the back of her mind.
Charlotte
Voiced by: Naomi Kusumi (Japanese); Steven Fenley (English)
He is a plump sorcerer who holds a high position in the organization and the magic ability of short-range telekinesis. He is in love with Olivia Litlet and keeps her by his side. For that, he is demoted to a Meat as punishment for his mismanagement and dies protecting her.

=== War Machines of the Past ===
Shlamuffen
The Ever-Laughing Demon Sword used by Shiron Byacornise, hence her epitaph, that can counter any attacks. It does seem to have its own consciousness to the point it would relentlessly attack a target of its own choosing even without the command of its wielder.
Argax
The Fantasy Slaughtering Cup that has the power to selectively erase the drinker's memories.
Yluculucu
Also referred to as the Spinning/Dancing Fairy, reflecting its appearance. Yluculucu is used as a container for magic rights, which are stored when people undergo Magical Deliberation within its vicinity. Depending on its user, it can either be the weakest or the strongest war machine.
Yor
Also known as the Stone Sword of Spent Time, this sword has the power to remove and gather books from those who have died. Yor's physical manifestation is known as Lascall Othello, which initially appears to be an old gentleman, but later takes on the form of a young girl.

=== Deities ===
Bantorra
The God of the Past, who represents the records of all humanity, having created the Bantorra Library and the monsters that guard its lower labyrinths.
Towitorra
The God of the Present, who represents the maintenance of the laws of physics.
Orntorra
The God of the Future, whose role is to guide humans to a better direction, by sending seven angels with the seven War Machines of the Past to destroy the era of the Age of Paradise.

== Media ==
=== Light novel ===
- Yamagata Ishio (author) / Maejima Juki (illustration), Shueisha Super Dash Bunko, 10 volumes
  1. "The Fighting Librarian and the Bomb in Love" First published on September 30, 2005 (released September 22), ISBN 4-08-630257-8
  2. "The Fighting Librarian and the Fool of Thunder" First published on January 30, 2006 (released January 25), ISBN 4-08-630276-4
  3. "The Fighting Librarian and the Labyrinth of Black Ants" First published on April 30, 2006 (Released on April 25), ISBN 4-08-630294-2
  4. "The Fighting Librarian and the Stone Sword of God" First published on July 30, 2006 (released on July 25), ISBN 4-08-630306-X
  5. "The Fighting Librarian and the Witch of Remembrance" First published on December 30, 2006 (released on December 20), ISBN 4-08-630333-7
  6. "The Fighting Librarian and the Rough Rope Princess" First published on April 30, 2007 (released on April 25), ISBN 978-4-08-630352-1
  7. "The Fighting Librarian and the Liar's Banquet" First published on August 30, 2007 (released on August 24), ISBN 978-4-08-630372-9
  8. "The Fighting Librarian and the Beast of the Final Chapter" First published on April 30, 2008 (Released on April 25), ISBN 978-4-08-630417-7
  9. "The Fighting Librarian and the Demon King of Despair" First published on July 29, 2009 (released on July 24), ISBN 978-4-08-630494-8
  10. "The Fighting Librarian and the Power of the World" First published on January 30, 2010 (released on January 22), ISBN 978-4-08-630527-3

=== Manga ===
==== Chapter list ====
No.	Release date	ISBN
1	February 19, 2009	978-4-08-877589-0
2	July 17, 2009	978-4-08-877692-7
3	November 19, 2009	978-4-08-877768-9

=== Anime ===
==== Episode list ====
No.	Title	Original release date
1	"Bombs, Books, and a Sinking Ship" "Bakudan to hon to shizumiyuku fune" (爆弾と本と沈み行く船)	October 2, 2009
When a group of 'Armed Librarians' launch an attack against the Shindeki Church on a ship named the Silver Smoke, they are then attacked by 'Human Bombs'. After boarding the ship and fighting off the 'Mock Men', the Armed Librarians find dozens of 'Meats' in the hold but are unable to save them all before the ship itself explodes. When the Armed Librarians return to the Bantorra Library, Hamyuts Meseta, the Acting Director of the Armed Librarians, shows a book fragment about Shiron Byacornise, the "Ever-Laughing Witch", who found a cure for the Dragon Pneumonia three centuries ago in the Ronar Dukedom. One of the few survivors of the Meats is Colio Tonies, whose only thoughts are of killing Hamyuts.
2	"Bombs, a Princess, and a Gray Town" "Bakudan to himegimi to haiiro no machi" (爆弾と姫君と灰色の街)	October 9, 2009
Colio and his companions, Relia Bookwart and Hyoue Jyanfus, find themselves at the Toatt Mine still searching for Hamyuts. However, it is not long before Luimon Mahaton, a local Armed Librarian, discovers that the three are Human Bombs. In the ensuing confusion, Hyoue detonates, killing Luimon as a result. The next day, Hamyuts, along with Mattalast Ballory and Mirepoc Finedel, head to the Toatt Mine to search for those responsible. At night, Relia crosses paths with Cigal Kulkesa, one of the 'True Men' of the Shindeki Church, at a bar. After being insulted of his kind, Relia detonates himself in an attempt to kill Cigal, but to no avail. The next morning, Colio comes across a girl named Iya Mira in the streets, who is despaired that her lover, Carthello Marshea, was killed when Hyoue had detonated. That night, Hamyuts arrives ashore outside Toatt Mine and starts killing the Meats after her with her sling and rocks at far distances inside the city.
3	"Bombs, Humans, and the God of Death's Disease" "Bakudan to ningen to shi no kami no byou" (爆弾と人間と死の神の病)	October 16, 2009
After having gather more book fragments about Shiron, Colio learns more about her past. Shiron had witnessed the spread of Dragon Pneumonia, an epidemic affecting much of the people of the Ronar Dukedom. She developed an antidote to cure this disease, but waited after it spread further to gain profit, being beheaded as a consequence. Colio also comes face to face with Hamyuts, the woman he is supposed to kill, but things do not go as he thought they would. Hamyuts rips out the bomb from Colio's chest and takes the book fragments with her upon leaving. Mattalast and Mirepoc learn that the city of Toatt Mine is infected with Dragon Pneumonia, and Hamyuts figures that Cigal is behind this. To make matters worse, a typhoon is headed towards the area, putting Hamyuts at a disadvantage.
4	"The Setting Sun, Shiron, and Colio" "Yuugata to shiron to korio" (夕方とシロンとコリオ)	October 23, 2009
Hamyuts and Cigal finally face each other in battle, but Cigal wields Shlamuffen, Shiron's sword that is able to counter any attack. Because of this, it does not seem like Hamyuts has much hope of winning. Meanwhile, Colio goes to Iya's house, where another book fragment of Shiron is kept. After seeing how Shiron has suffered in the past, Colio realizes that Iya can somehow reach Shiron with her voice, convincing him that he too must fight. On top of a train, Cigal tries to push Hamyuts off, but that is until she destroys the railroad tracks ahead, catching him off guard for a moment. Colio arrives on the scene, severely injuring Cigal with a blade, allowing Hamyuts to finish him off. Back at the Bantorra Library, Mattalast is back to health, Mirepoc is gradually getting better and Hamyutz is recovering from her injuries. However, it is reported that Volken Macmani has stolen Yluculucu, a weapon used as a container for magic rights.
5	"A Betrayal, a Cup, and a Meandering Path" "Uragiri to hai to mayoi no komichi" (裏切りと杯と迷いの小道)	October 30, 2009
Following the theft of Yluculucu and Volken's apparent betrayal, everyone at the Bantorra Library begins to question his motives and his character. Mirepoc has been particularly affected by her friend's actions and seeks solace in the books of the lower libraries. There, she discovers a book about a romantic couple at shore, much to her embarrassment. However, she knocks over another book, which shows a memory of a young Volken in training who accidentally trips an old woman while running to show Mattalast a butterfly he found. The old woman later forgives Volken and tells him to keep working hard. Mirepoc finds herself in a dangerous part of the lower libraries faced with a Guardian Beast, but Mattalast manages to save her. Later, Mirepoc requests Hamyuts permission to use Argax, a cup to selectively erase memories by drinking it, in this case choosing to erase Volken from her memories.
6	"Thunder, a Monster, and a Girl's Punch" "Kaminari to kaibutsu to naguru shoujo" (雷と怪物と殴る少女)	November 6, 2009
A man who refers to himself a masked monster arrives at the Bantorra Library and demands to see Hamyuts. A flashback about a Meat named Enlike Bishile, who yearns to smile before his death, is told by Ganbanzel Grof, another one of the True Men, that killing others brings happiness in oneself. The monster is immediately confronted by Mattalast and Mirepoc, as well as Minth Chezain, who all eventually manage to force him to retreat despite his numerous magical abilities. Meanwhile, Noloty, dispatched to recover Luimon's book which has gone missing from the Toatt Mine, catches a criminal in town who has stolen a pursue from an old lady. Hamyuts catches up to Noloty, who reports that the book was stolen when a train heading towards the port was attacked. When they then come across a street fight, they see a white-haired man, who can withstand quite a punch. Hamyuts later revealed that this man's name is Zatoh Rondohoon, who is the one behind the theft of Luimon's book.
7	"A Smile, a Mask, and a Man with a Death Wish" "Egao to kamen to shini tagari no otoko" (笑顔と仮面と死にたがりの男)	November 13, 2009
In the past, Enlike receives special training from Boramott Meif, subordinate of Ganbanzel, on a secluded island with some other male Meats, urging to become the strongest monster. One night, Enlike challenges Ronkeny, one of the Meats, to a sparring match to the death. In the present, Noloty confronts Zatoh about his theft of Luimon's book and his suicidal tendencies. Zatoh tells her that she can have the book only if she can kill him. Meanwhile, Mattalast and Mirepoc learn that Zatoh may be the monster who attacked the Bantorra Library. Back in the past, Enlike gives Kumora, a female Meat that is the caretaker of the male Meats, a seashell that Ronkeny handed him before their sparring match. Again in the present, Minth, disguised as the masked monster, attacks Zatoh right in front of Noloty. As Minth prepares to stab Zatoh, Noloty asks Zatoh what he wants to do before dying, and he counterattacks and responds by saying he wants to smile before he takes sudden leave.
8	"A Pond, Comrades, and a Seashell" "Numa to nakama to hamabe no kaigara" (沼と仲間と浜辺の貝殻)	November 20, 2009
In the past, Enlike struggled in his training due his high concern for Kumora, almost being killed by Sasari, who is Ronkeny's brother, during a match at night. The next morning, Kumora tries to kill Enlike behind his back when he wakes up, saying that he is saddening that five Meats had died under him, but stop when he himself wishes to end this madness and die. Boramott later tells Enlike to find and kill Kumora, but he kills Boramott in response. He sees a crying Kumora at the edge of a cliff, so he pushes her off to end her life of sorrow. In the present, Minth tells Noloty that Zatoh is a 'Book Eater', a monster who can devour books gaining the knowledge and power of the deceased person concerned. When Zatoh consumes Luimon's book, Noloty becomes so angry that she becomes serious about fighting for the first time. Meanwhile, somewhere inside of Zatoh's body, all of the souls of the books he has consumed begin to rebel against him. Enlike kills all the souls within Zatoh's body, causing Zatoh to lose all his power.
9	"A True Man, a Battlefield, and My World" "Shinjin to senjou to watashi no sekai" (真人と戦場と私の世界)	November 27, 2009
With Enlike now in control of Zatoh's body he returns to the Bantorra Library with Noloty to try and atone for his sins. Unfortunately, despite Noloty's affection for him many of the other Armed Librarians do not trust Enlike. One night, Enlike is haunted by Ganbanzel, who desires his strongest monster to return to him. This strikes interest from Hamyuts, who wants to fight Enlike one day to test his strength. While strolling around town, things are only made worse by Ganbanzel's incessant hounding of his former protege, so Enlike gives in and agrees to return to Ganbanzel only if Noloty is not to be harmed. When Enlike later goes to see Ganbanzel, he orders Enlike to use his power on him. As Enlike summons lightning from the sky, he thinks about Noloty, who said that she will protect the world without killing. This causes Enlike to be hesitant at first, but he ultimately sets Ganbanzel on fire to honor his death wish.
10	"An Eccentric, a Mother, and the Black Ants' Nest" "Henjin to hahaoya to kuroari no su" (変人と母親と黒蟻の巣)	December 4, 2009
The Bantorra Library comes under attack by Mokkania Fluru, one of the strongest Armed Librarians, infesting the lower labyrinth with a swarm of ants. Hamyuts is now trapped in the labyrinth with this traitor, and the other Armed Librarians regroup and prepare for a counterattack. Earlier before, Noloty allowed an innocent couple access to the labyrinth, and the blind, red-haired woman who accompanied Mokkania there is said to be his mother, Renas Fluru. However, the Armed Librarians realize that Noloty unknowingly drank from Argax, planned by the Shindeki Church, causing her to forget the rule of not allowing anyone into the labyrinth. After it is learned that Renas had died in the past, it soon emerges that Mokkania is being manipulated by a bald man named Winkeny Bize, a liaison of the Shindeki Church who is able to morph into petroleum, urging the Armed Librarians to find a way to snap him out of it before it is too late. Ireia Kitty, the oldest Armed Librarian, goes inside the labyrinth and kills all the ants by destroying the nearby pillars. When Ireia temporarily freezes time, Hamyuts prepares to escape.
11	"A Weakling, the Labyrinth, and Moving the Queen" "Jakusha to meikyuu to joou no sashite" (弱者と迷宮と女王の指し手)	December 11, 2009
With Hamyuts now in possession of Shlamuffen she decides that it is time to confront the treacherous Mokkania. Meanwhile, the reason for Mokkania's sudden attempt to kill Hamyuts becomes clear and it is not what any of the Armed Librarians originally believed. In the past, Winkeny was doing an investigation on Mokkania, finding out that Mokkania became an Armed Librarian because of his mother's death. Winkeny told Mokkania that the woman resembling Renas will be his new "mother" if he can kill Hamyuts. During the battle, Hamyuts relentlessly attacks Mokkania, but he floods the labyrinth with ants, piling them over her. Elsewhere, Renas stumbles upon a book fragment which explains that she is not Mokkania's real mother, but she still accepts him as such. Hamyuts, having survived, witnesses Mokkania killing himself with ants after he honored his death wish of reuniting with his mother.
12	"The Past, Irrationality, and Pipe's Smoke" "Kako to rifujin to paipu no kebu" (過去と理不尽とパイプの煙)	December 18, 2009
In the past, Mattalast was a trombonist who had done gigs in an illegal pub, much to Ireia's disappointment. When he laid eyes on Hamyuts for the first time, he already took a liking to her. When they suddenly engaged in a fight to the death, they became lovers after they realizing their strength against each other. Within a few years of training as an Armed Librarian, Hamyuts surpassed the lower ranks and was deemed the strongest. Fhotona Badgammon, the Acting Director at the time, became suspicious of Hamyuts because of this and ordered Mattalast to eliminate Hamyuts during a dangerous mission to capture an Armed Librarian traitor named Hiza Miken. A battalion under Hiza attacked Hamyuts and Mattalast at night, and while Hamyuts killed the lot of them, Mattalast struggled with his love for her as he attempts to shoot her, but in the end he chose to spare her life.
13	"A Day Off, a Picture Book, and Rusty Hair" "Kyuuka to ehon to akasabi no kami" (休暇と絵本と赤錆の髪)	December 25, 2009
Mirepoc uses her day off to investigate about an old gentleman named Lascall Othello, who murdered an actress named Parney Pearlmanta eight years ago and used Yor, a sword that has the power to remove a book from her dead body. However, a rumor spread about Lascall and there were some con artists who either pretended to be him or offered to introduce him for a fee. Since Mirepoc is so determined to find Parney's book and solve this mystery, Mattalast is sent to watch over her for the time being. Unbeknownst to them, Alme Norton, one of the Mock Men of the Shindeki Church, is also interested in the mysterious Lascall and she is prepared to kill in order to find her man. When Mirepoc and Alme come face to face in an illegal bookstore, it is only thanks to Mattalast's timely intervention that Mirepoc survives. Later on, Mattalast scolds Mirepoc for taking action on her own without contacting him first. It is revealed that when Alme was street performing as a violinist, she soon became Cigal's subordinate in the Shindeki Church, but he later abandoned her, being the reason why she is searching for Lascall.
14	"The Setting Sun, a Storyteller, and a Collection of Fables" "Rakujitsu to kataribe to ikutsuka no guuwa" (落日と語りべと幾つかの寓話)	January 1, 2010
Shiron tells the story of how the world was created and how the Bantorra Library was founded. She then recounts the various events that have occurred up until now. Such events include Colio's defeat of Cigal, Volken's betrayal, Zatoh's redemption by Noloty, Mokkania's death and Mirepoc's hunt for the truth about Lascall.
15	"A Girl, a Girl, and the Bed of God" "Shoujo to shoujo to kami no nedoko" (少女と少女と神の寝床)	January 8, 2010
Mirepoc continues to search for answers about Lascall but her red-haired rival appears to be one step ahead of her. Alme is able to locate Parney's book hidden inside a bookshelf, which uncovers that Parney started a successful career as an actress due to the sponsorship of the Shindeki Church, but she was murdered when she lost sight of happiness. Mirepoc meets a young boy at a restaurant named Lully, who explains that his father was a street peddler who was supposedly called Lascall. When Lully senses Lascall in a nearby alley, Mirepoc follows him there to warn him. However, Mirepoc is unable to stop Lully in time from being killed by Lascall, who promises that he will come after her after he finds and kills Alme. In a ruse to kill Lascall, Mirepoc and Alme fight each other as a diversion to kill Lascall once and for all. During their final duel against each other, Mirepoc signals to Mattalast to shoot Alme from behind, thus ending her life.
16	"A Banned Book, a Coward, and the Sacred Eyes" "Kinsho to funuke to seijougan" (禁書と腑抜けと聖浄眼)	January 15, 2010
Minth is assigned to retrieve illegal snuff books with the help of Yukizona Harumi and Yuri Harumi, both Armed Librarians who are children of nobility. However, Minth soon runs into an old friend named Glein, who currently owns his own restaurant. Minth is reminded of when he was criminally involved with Glein in stealing and dealing snuff books, which cause the reader to become consumed by its own euphoria. Even though Minth was against the idea of selling snuff books, Glein thought otherwise, gaining a profit out of it back then. Minth is later given a book that contains information about someone who died while abusing a snuff book. He then begins to realize that Glein has more to do with his mission than he first thought, forcing him to choose between his duty and his friend. When Glein attacks Minth with snuff book zombies, Yukizona and Yuri arrive to intervene. As Glein then gives in to Minth and hands over the snuff book, Minth shoots Glein as the price for the sins he committed.
17	"A Return Home, an Encounter, and Burning Bridges" "Kikan to deai to moeagaru midori" (帰還と出会いと燃えあがる緑)	January 22, 2010
Volken finally returns to the Bantorra Library after his apparent defection and attempts to prove his innocence, though the other Armed Libraries have mixed responses to his plea. However, his return causes Mirepoc to question her decision to drink the water of Argax as her feelings for her former friend begin to return. Meanwhile, Enlike visits Renas regularly and tries to help her make sense of her reemerging memories. Since he too had suffered trying to recover his memories before, he relates to her in a way, saying that he vowed to protect something held dear. Volken reminisces behind the reason he became an Armed Library, soon running into Renas, whom he knows as Olivia Litlet, the true owner of Renas's body. The next day, it is informed that Volken and Renas ran off via flying boat towards Darai Mine. Olivia, who used to be in possession of Yluculucu, was among the Meats who survived the explosion on the Silver Smoke that was actually caused by Hamyuts. If Volken can somehow reawaken Olivia's memories, he will use them to testify against Hamyuts in court.
18	"A Propeller, Remembrance, and a Man of Lead" "Puropera to tsuisou to namari no ningen" (プロペラと追想と鉛の人間)	January 29, 2010
Vizac Jigraz, Volken's former instructor, challenges Volken to a duel in an attempt to bring him back to the Bantorra Library. However, Volken and surpasses and defeats Vizac, allowing him and Olivia to escape into the Kra District. However, Hamyuts continues to pursue the traitors in order to destroy the secret of Vend Ruga once and for all. She remembers of how she defeated Vend Ruga, a weapon whose body is made of lead, guarded by a group of Mock Men in a fortress in the middle of a canyon. However, the carving inside the Silver Smoke had said that Vend Ruga is now living inside Olivia. Mirepoc contacts Volken telling him that the other Armed Librarians are taking his side, but Olivia believes he is being deceived. The Armed Librarians learn that Vizac is dead and they all blame Volken for their comrade's murder, all except for Mirepoch. Passing by the Kra District, Olivia starts to remember more about her past when she treated her fellow Meats nefariously.
19	"A Fool, a Void, and a Spinning Fairy" "Ahou to kokuu to odoru ningyou" (阿呆と虚空と踊る人形)	February 5, 2010
Hamyuts has finally caught up with Volken and Olivia at the Darai Mine. Olivia uses Volken's source of illusion abilities as an attempt to overcome an army of Human Bombs before locating Yluculucu. Meanwhile, Volken finally faces off against Hamyuts. When she reveals that the Shindeki Church was actually created by the Armed Librarians, she catches him off guard, killing him in the process. Lascall, who has been resurrected as a young girl, removes a book from Volken's body, which contains his innocence for Hamyuts to review. Olivia regains her memories of how Charlotte, a plump sorcerer holding a high position of the Shindeki Church, fell in love with her. He was demoted as a Meat as punishment for his mismanagement. It is seen that Olivia was the one who carved the message inside the Silver Smoke. She finally finds Yluculucu inside a cabin, but as Hamyuts starts aiming stones at the cabin, Charlotte appears and shields her from getting hit, causing him to die. It is also seen that Vend Ruga had protected her in the past until he was killed. Olivia uses Yluculucu to return the memories back to all the Meats at the cost of her own life.
20	"Funeral Bells, a Book, and a Boy with a Death Wish" "Choushou to hon to shinitagari no shounen" (弔鐘と本と死にたがりの少年)	February 12, 2010
When the Meats have now revolted against the Shindeki Church, the Ismo Republic suddenly declares war on the Bantorra Library. The severely weakened Shindeki Church is suspected to be somehow involved. Meanwhile on a train, Lascall delivers a book to Enlike, shocked to learn that it is about Noloty. She was sent on a mission to Toatt Mine to stop bioterrorism caused by the Shindeki Church from spreading in the town. When she arrived there, she takes on the Mock Men before encountering Arkit Chroma, who throws a toxic potion at her in defense. However, she drinks the potion, commenting that this disease does not affect the Armed Librarians. Arkit, giving up on his life, is cheered up when Noloty befriends him, aside from his desire to attack the Armed Librarians. Suddenly, a sniper attempts to shoot Arkit, which prompts him to see Kachua Binhas, the Governor of Paradise and current leader of the Shindeki Church. Although Noloty promised Arkit that she will not die, she later died nonetheless.
21	"Enmity, the Color Blue, and the Rope Princess" "Nikushimi to ao to aranawa no himegimi" (憎しみと蒼と荒縄の姫君)	February 19, 2010
The Bantorra Library is surrounded by the forces of the Ismo Republic, now allied with the Guinbecs Empire. Hamyuts and Ireia decide it is time they joined the fight alongside most of the other Armed Librarians, leaving Mirepoc in charge of the Bantorra Library. Meanwhile, Enlike continues to read Noloty's book in order to discover her final wish. In the past, Noloty and Arkit continued their journey to see Kachua. At nighttime, Noloty encountered Kachua, who told her that the Shindeki Church wishes to surrender to the Armed Librarians. In the present, Minth tells Mirepoc of a startling discovery he made concerning this sudden war. He explains that all of Meats on the island are infected with Cerulean Death, a disease responsible for causing an outbreak of hostilities towards the Armed Librarians. Ireia is among those who lost their lives to the infected Meats. In the past, Kachua revealed to Noloty that Arkit holds the power to infect others with hatred, being the reason why Arkit needs to die.
22	"The Sky, an Ending, and a Girl's World" "Sora to ketsumatsu to kanojo no sekai" (空と結末と彼女の世界)	February 26, 2010
Although all the Armed Librarians learn about Cerulean Death, but this knowledge does them little good. As such Hamyuts prepares to lead the remaining Armed Librarians in a last-ditch offensive against the growing enemy forces that have surrounded the Bantorra Library. In the past, when Arkit mourned for all of his friends that died because of the Armed Librarians, Noloty embraced him in response. However, Arkit infects her and beats her up before leaving with Kachua. In the present, Enlike finally finishes Noloty's book and finds Kachua to fulfill her final wish. However, Enlike's lightning bolts fail to penetrate through Kachua's home, being guarded by a mist barrier. In the past, Noloty, barely hanging onto her life, is killed by Dartom, an informant of the Shindeki Church, right in front of Arkit. In the present, Enlike demands Arkit, now in the form of a lizard, to read Noloty, but the latter refuses. Enlike then gathers thunderclouds and destroys Kachua and his home from above. With Noloty's book, Enlike shows Arlit that the world belongs to Noloty. Arlit loses his ability to hate and passes on, thus the war has ended and those infected return to normal.
23	"A Jailbreak, a Tool and a Desert Violet" "Datsugoku to dougu to sabaku no sumire" (脱獄と道具と砂漠の菫)	March 5, 2010
Two months following the war, things are different at the Bantorra Library. Minth has been promoted to be the new Governor of Paradise and has begun the task of recruiting new True Men with Latte Malgund, his assistant. Minth learns that an old man with a spade-shaped eyepatch has died, and Lascall removes a book from the man's body. Meanwhile, the Armed Librarians have had enough of Hamyuts's secrets and have decided to rebel against her. However, before they can put her on trial she escapes, after Lascall delivers her the book, in order to carry out one final task. While driving across a desert, Minth and Latte spot a field of violets near a rundown building. Inside, they find Chacoly Cocotte, a former childhood friend of Hamyuts, who caught up with the two. The old man, recognized as Makia Dekishart, served three terms before Hamyuts, who raised Hamyuts and Chacoly as tools of destruction back then. Chacoly uses her power to inject her soul into Minth to control his mind to love her.
24	"Truth, Love, and the Second Sealed Library" "Shinjitsu to koi to daini fuuin shoko" (真実と恋と第二封印書庫)	March 12, 2010
Hamyuts saves Minth from being possessed and then kills Chacoly, not being affected by her power. Lascall removes a book from Chacoly for Hamyuts to read, in order to see what happened after the two of them parted ways. In the past, Chacoly sought to meet Ruruta Coozancoona, the Director of the Bantorra Library, to control him to love her, after he emerged from a giant tree. When she read his soul, she is despaired when she founds out he was in love with someone else. In the present, with everyone out searching for Hamyuts, Enlike is able to sneak into the lower labyrinth of the Bantorra Library, where he and Mattalast come face-to-face with Ruruta, who restrains them with his tree branches. Hamyuts, via public address system, announces to the Armed Librarians that Ruruta has closed the Bantorra Library. Mattalast and Enlike break free from the tree branches. Ruruta causes the area to be covered in snow, which makes everyone outside the Bantorra Library fall into a deep slumber.
25	"Tranquility, Indolence, and a Tale of Despair" "Seijaku to damin to zetsubou no monogatari" (静寂と惰眠と絶望の物語)	March 19, 2010
During the era of the Age of Paradise, as Orntorra, the God of the future, prepared to send seven angels armed with seven deadly 'War Machines of the Past' to destroy the world, Ruruta was the only one man destined to save it. However, this pressure on him gives him much distress in his heart. Nieniu, the last surviving member of a tribe of minstrels, found him after sensing this distress, so she soothed him by singing. In the present, after Hamyuts sings for Ruruta out of mockery, Ruruta pierces through Hamyuts with a giant tree branch, which Mattalast and Enlike both witness before passing out in the snow. Back in the past, the love between Ruruta and Nieniu has kindled, and with her motivation, he becomes stronger. After having consumed the magic rites of 100,000 books, Ruruta was able to defeat the 'Beasts of the Final Chapter', but he was forced to kill Nieniu in the process. Vexille Mariotte, the present monarch of that era, actually caused Ruruta to drink from Argax, erasing his memories of Nieniu. According to the book Lascall removed, Nieniu was tortured and buried by Vexille. She later reincarnated as the statue of the 'Soul of Destruction' to control the Beasts of the Final Chapter, which then led to her death. As such Ruruta created the Armed Librarians and the Shindeki Church in order to fulfill Nieniu's wishes and make her happy.
26	"Atonement, Delusion, and Books Within Books" "Shokuzai to madoi to hon no naka no hon" (贖罪と惑と本の中の本)	March 26, 2010
Inside Ruruta's 'Nonentity Entrails', a seemingly regenerative and unstoppable Hamyuts wages war on Ruruta. She has the upper hand, inflicting pain on him and reviving the magic rites in the form of innocent men before dissolving them into sand. However, things change quickly when Ruruta transfers all of his power to Nieniu, which means Hamyuts must face the Soul of Destruction herself. She is rendered helpless against the Beasts of the Final Chapter, and her arm is severely injured during her battle. Alme and Charlotte, among the characters that have died in the past, attempt to fare off against two beasts, but to no avail. Hamyuts is met with her unlikely, old friend Colio, with Shiron inside his soul, to help her to turn the tide of battle back in her favor. Nieniu rebels against Ruruta, saying that his sins are unforgivable. Meanwhile, at the Bantorra Library, Lascall reawakens Mirepoc, but at the cost of her life. Colio gives Ruruta his blade before dissolving into sand.
27	"The Power of the World" "Sekai no chikara" (世界の力)	April 2, 2010
Hamyuts uses her ability to summon the fallen Armed Librarians into the Nonentity Entrails in a struggle to defeat Nieniu and defend the world. When Ruruta calls on Mirepoc, Chocaly transfers her powers to Mirepoc before entering Nonentity Entrails as well. With her new ability, Mirepoc revive the Armed Librarians still in the living world to protect the innocent population from the Beasts of the Final Chapter. As the battle climaxes, Nieniu creates a wall of ice surrounding a pyramid of thorns when Ruruta runs up to her, but luckily Hamyuts slings the ice to allow Ruruta to pass through and reunite with his lover. Hamyuts and the others inside the Nonentity Entrails die happily, while everyone in the living world celebrate their victory. Ten years after the Bantorra Library was destroyed and the Armed Librarians was disbanded, Mirepoc is surprised to see Mattalast still alive, who vows to return to her and he finishes rewriting the stories of all the lost, loved ones of the past.

==== Music ====
The composer for the series is Yoshihisa Hirano.

===== Opening themes =====
- "Datengoku Sensen" (堕天國宣戦) by Ali Project (Episodes 1–16).
- "Seisai no Ripeno" (星彩のRipieno) by Sasaki Sayaka (Episodes 17–27).

===== Closing themes =====
- "Light of Dawn" by Annabel (Episodes 1–16).
- "Dominant Space" by Aira Yuhki (Episodes 17–27)
