= Montague Burton Professor of International Relations =

The Montague Burton Professorship of International Relations is a named chair at the University of Oxford and the London School of Economics, and a former chair at the University of Edinburgh. Created by the endowment of Montague Burton in UK universities, the Oxford chair was established in 1930 and is associated with a Fellowship of Balliol College, Oxford, while the chair at LSE was established in 1936.

== Montague Burton Professors of International Relations at Oxford ==
- 1930–1944 Sir Alfred Zimmern
- 1944–1947 Sir Llewellyn Woodward
- 1948–1971 Agnes Headlam-Morley
- 1972–1976 Alastair Buchan
- 1977–1985 Hedley Bull
- 1986–2007 Sir Adam Roberts
- 2008–2021 Andrew Hurrell
- 2022-2025 Neta Crawford

== Montague Burton Professors of International Relations at LSE ==
In 1919, Ernest Cassel endowed a £500,000 educational fund which was in part used to establish the Sir Ernest Cassel Professor of International Relations at the University of London. During Manning's tenure in 1936, the chair was re-endowed and renamed the Montague Burton Professorship of International Relations.

- 1924–1929 Philip Noel-Baker
- 1930–1962 Charles Manning
- 1962–1978 Geoffrey Goodwin
- 1978–1988 Susan Strange
- 1989–1990 R J Vincent
- 1991–2004 Christopher J. Hill
- 2005–2008 Fred Halliday
- 2009–2011 Barry Buzan
- 2012–2017 Iver B. Neumann

== Montague Burton Professors of International Relations at Edinburgh ==
- 1948–1951 James Leslie Brierly
- 1951–1957 Carlile Aylmer Macartney
- 1958–1961 Elizabeth Wiskemann
- 1961–1967 Peter Ritchie Calder, Lord Ritchie-Calder

== Selected reading ==
- Alderson, Kai and Andrew Hurrell, Hedley Bull On International Society (2003).
- Markwell, Don (1986), 'Sir Alfred Zimmern Revisited: Fifty Years On', Review of International Studies.
- Markwell, Donald, 'Sir Alfred Eckhard Zimmern', Oxford Dictionary of National Biography, 2004.
- Miller, J.D.B. and R.J. Vincent (eds), Order and Violence: Hedley Bull and International Relations (1990).
- Adam Roberts, 'Professing International Relations at Oxford', Oxford Magazine, Oxford, Noughth Week, Hilary Term 2008, pp. 10–12.
- Vigezzi, Brunello, The British Committee on the Theory of International Politics (2005)
