= The Anarchical Society =

1977 non-fiction book by Hedley Bull

- First edition
- Author: Hedley Bull
- Language: English
- Subject: International relations
- Publisher: Columbia University Press
- Publication date: 1977
- Publication place: United States
- Media type: Hardback
- Pages: 335
- ISBN: 0-231-04132-2
- OCLC: 2332174
- Dewey Decimal: 341.2 19
- LC Class: JX1954 .B79 1977

The Anarchical Society: A Study of Order in World Politics is a 1977 book by Hedley Bull and a founding text of the English School of international relations theory. The title refers to the assumption of anarchy in the international system (posited primarily by realists) and argues for the existence of an international society.

Despite its title, the book progresses well beyond the concept of "anarchy." The field of international relations is dominated by the declinist paradigm of inevitable imperial fall and balance of power or "anarchy." This is a Eurocentric perspective based on the case of Rome. The Anarchical Society is one of a few, and one of the earliest, works to break the bonds of Eurocentrism: In “the broad sweep of human history... the form of states system has been the exception rather than the rule” (1977: p 21).

The book also outlines Bull's theory of new medievalism.

== Bibliographic details ==
- Hedley Bull, The Anarchical Society: A Study of Order in World Politics (London: Macmillan, 1977), ISBN 0333199146.
- Hedley Bull, The Anarchical Society: A Study of Order in World Politics, 2nd edn (London: Macmillan, 1995), ISBN 0333638220 (with a new foreword by Stanley Hoffmann).
- Hedley Bull, The Anarchical Society: A Study of Order in World Politics, 3rd edn (New York: Columbia University Press, 2002), ISBN 0231127634 (paper), ISBN 0231127626 (cloth) (includes a substantial new foreword by Andrew Hurrell).
