= R. J. Vincent =

Raymond John Vincent (February 28, 1943 – November 2, 1990), known as R J Vincent or John Vincent, was a scholar of the English school of international relations theory. He was a graduate of the University College of Wales, Aberystwyth, and the Australian National University. As well as holding visiting positions at Princeton University and the Australian National University, he was professor of international relations ar Keele University, Fellow of Nuffield College, Oxford, and Montague Burton Professor of International Relations at the London School of Economics from 1989 until his death.

He is most famous for his books Nonintervention and International Order, which was developed from his PhD working under Hedley Bull, and Human Rights in International Relations. He was a long-term editor of the journal Review of International Studies.

== Personal life ==
Vincent was married to Angela, with whom he had two children, the TV journalist Geraint Vincent and Gareth Vincent.

== Monographs ==
- Nonintervention and International Order (1974) Princeton: Princeton University Press
- Human Rights in International Relations (1984) Cambridge: Cambridge University Press
