= Hedley Bull =

Australian academic

Hedley Bull FBA
- Born: 10 June 1932; Sydney, Australia
- Died: 18 May 1985 (aged 52); Oxford, United Kingdom

Education
- Education: University of Sydney

Philosophical work
- School: English School
- Institutions: Australian National University; London School of Economics and Political Science; University of Oxford
- Doctoral students: Jason Hu
- Main interests: International relations
- Notable ideas: Society of states

Hedley Norman Bull FBA (10 June 1932 – 18 May 1985) was Professor of International Relations at the Australian National University, the London School of Economics and the University of Oxford until his death from cancer in 1985. He was Montague Burton Professor of International Relations at Oxford from 1977 to 1985, and died there.

== Biography ==
Bull was born in Sydney, Australia, where he attended Fort Street High School. He went on to study history and philosophy at the University of Sydney, where he was strongly influenced by the philosopher John Anderson. In 1953, Bull left Australia to study politics at Oxford, and after two years he was appointed to an assistant lectureship in international relations at the London School of Economics and Political Science (LSE).

In 1965, Bull was appointed director of the Arms Control and Disarmament Unit of the British Foreign Office, forfeiting his Australian identity for British citizenship. Two years later, in 1967, he was appointed to a professorship of international relations at the Australian National University (ANU) in Canberra.

In 1977, Bull published his main work, The Anarchical Society. It is widely regarded as a key textbook in the field of international relations and is also seen as the central text in the so-called "English School" of international relations. In this book, he argues that despite the anarchical character of the international arena, it is characterised by the formation of not only a system of states, but a society of states. His requirements for an entity to be called a state are that it must claim sovereignty over (i) a group of people (ii) a defined territory, and that it must have a government. States form a system when they have a sufficient degree of interaction and effect on one another's decisions, so as they "behave—at least in some measure—as parts of a whole." A system of states can exist without it also being a society of states. A society of states comes into existence "when a group of states, conscious of certain common interests and common values, form a society in the sense that they conceive themselves to be bound by a common set of rules in their relations with one another, and share in the working of common institutions."

The society of states is a way for Bull to analyse and assess possibilities of order in world politics. He continues his argument by giving the concept of order in social life, and the mechanisms of: the balance of power, international law, diplomacy, war and the great powers central roles. He finally concludes that, despite the existence of possible alternative forms of organization, the states system is our best chance of achieving order in world politics.

== Selected works ==
- The control of the arms race: Disarmament and arms control in the missile age (1965)
- Strategic studies and its critics (1967)
- The Anarchical Society: A Study of Order in World Politics (1977)
- The Expansion of International Society, co-edited with Adam Watson (1984).
- Intervention in World Politics (1984)
- Justice in international relations (1984) (1983-84 Hagey lectures)
- The Challenge of the Third Reich (1986) (The Adam von Trott Memorial Lectures)
- (with Adam Roberts and Benedict Kingsbury), ed. (19 March 1992). Hugo Grotius and International Relations, Oxford University Press, 1990. Oxford University Press. ISBN 9780198277712.ISBN 0-19-825569-1 (hardback); ISBN 0-19-827771-7 (paperback). US edition. Oxford Scholarship Online. Google Books.

There is a comprehensive bibliography of Hedley Bull's works (prepared by Donald Markwell) in:

- J. D. B. Miller and R J Vincent (eds.), Order and Violence, Oxford University Press, 1990,

and

- Robert O'Neill and David N. Schwartz (eds.), Hedley Bull on Arms Control, Macmillan, 1987.

== See also ==
- New medievalism
- Domestic analogy
- The Anarchical Society
- Montague Burton Professor of International Relations

== General references ==
- Coral Bell and Meredith Thatcher (eds.), Remembering Hedley, ANU Press, anu.edu.au (2008).
- Alderson, Kai and Andrew Hurrell Hedley Bull On International Society (2003)
- Donald Markwell, "Instincts to lead": on leadership, peace, and education (2013)
- Miller, J.D.B. and Vincent, R. J. (eds), Order and Violence: Hedley Bull and International Relations (1990)
- Vigezzi, Brunello The British Committee on the Theory of International Politics (2005)
- Michele Chiaruzzi, 'Hedley Bull: In Search of International Order', in F. Andreatta (ed), Great Works in International Relations (2017).
- Cooper, Andrew F. The Concertation Impulse in World Politics Contestation over Fundamental Institutions and the Constrictions of Institutionalist International Relations. (Oxford: Oxford University Press, 2024).
