= Ken Booth (academic) =

British political scientist

Ken Booth FBA (born 29 January 1943) is a British international relations theorist, and the former E. H. Carr Professor of International Politics at UCW Aberystwth.

He has been a visiting researcher at the Naval War College in Newport, Rhode Island; at Dalhousie University in Halifax, Canada; and at Cambridge University. He is a former Chair, and the first President of the British International Studies Association. He was part of the editorial team of the Review of International Studies, and currently serves as both Academic Editor of the Lynne Rienner Critical Security Studies series and the journal International Relations.

He is an elected Academician of the Society of Learned Societies for the Social Sciences. He was elected to the British Academy in 2006.

In a 1991 article in the international relations journal International Affairs, he set out a position which he labelled "utopian realism". Within the terminology of international relations theory, he is considered a post-positivist and a critic of orthodox realism by contemporary academics in the field of international relations.

== Key publications ==
- Booth, Ken (2007) Theory of World Security (Cambridge: Cambridge University Press)
- Booth, Ken and Wheeler, Nicholas J. (2007) The Security Dilemma: Fear, Cooperation, and Trust in World Politics (Houndmills and New York: Palgrave Macmillan)
- Booth, Ken (2005) (eds.) Critical Security Studies and World Politics (London and Boulder: Lynne Rienner Publications Inc,)
- Booth, Ken and Dunne, Tim (2002) (eds.) Worlds in Collision. Terror and the Future of Global Order (Houndmills and New York: Palgrave Macmillan)
- Booth, Ken (1999) "Three Tyrannies" in Dunne, Tim and Wheeler, Nicholas J. (eds.) Human Rights in Global Politics (Cambridge: Cambridge University Press), 31-70.
- Booth, Ken (1995) "Human wrongs in international relations", International Affairs, 71(1), 103-26
- Booth, Ken (1991) "Security and emancipation", Review of International Studies, 17(4), 313-26
- Booth, Ken (1991) "Security in Anarchy: Utopian Realism in Theory and Practice", International Affairs, 67(3), 527-45
- Booth, Ken (1979) Strategy and Ethnocentrism (London: Croom Helm Ltd)
- Booth, Ken (1977) Navies and Foreign Policy (New York: Crane, Russak)
