= Ranse Eroica =

Single by Ali Project
- Released: July 14, 2010
- Genre: Neoclassical
- Label: Mellow Head

Ali Project singles chronology
"Datengoku Sensen" (2009)	"Ranse Eroica" (2010)	"Katana to Saya" (2010)

"Ranse Eroica" (亂世エロイカ, Ranse Eroika; lit. "Troubled Times Eroica" or "Chaotic Heroic") is the 27th single by Gothic music duo Ali Project. This single was released on July 14, 2010 under Mellow Head and the single only come in a regular CD only edition. The single's catalog number is LHCM-1078. The single title is used as the opening theme for the PlayStation Portable game, Fate/Extra.

== Track listing ==
#	Track name	Romaji	English
01	亂世エロイカ	Ranse Eroika	Chaotic Heroic
02	腕 kaina	Ude kaina	Kaina Arm
03	亂世エロイカ (instrumental)	Ranse Eroika (instrumental)	Chaotic Heroic (instrumental)
04	腕 kaina (instrumental)	Ude kaina (instrumental)	Kaina Arm (instrumental)
