= Domestic analogy =

Domestic analogy is an international affairs term coined by Professor Hedley Bull. Domestic analogy is the idea that states are like a "society of individuals". The analogy makes the presumption that relations between individuals and relations between states are the same. The domestic analogy is used when aggression is explained as the international equivalent of armed robbery or murder. A person can look at international affairs like a society of people, except there is no police, and every conflict threatens the structure as a whole with collapse.

In his famous book Just and Unjust Wars, Michael Walzer uses the term to explain what is a just and unjust war.
