= Neo-medievalism =

Concept in political theory and literary theory

Neo-medievalism (or neomedievalism, new medievalism) is a term with a long history that has acquired specific technical senses in two branches of scholarship.

Neo-medievalism is a term used to describe modern situations that resemble certain aspects of the Middle Ages, especially when traditional political structures or cultural boundaries seem to break down or become less clear. The concept is often used to explain contemporary conditions—such as the weakening of nation-states, the rise of powerful non-state actors, or the blending of global cultures—that feel similar to the overlapping authorities and decentralized systems of medieval Europe. Outside of politics, the term also refers to the ways modern people reuse, reinterpret, or reinvent medieval ideas and imagery in literature, film, games, and other forms of popular culture. In this broader sense, neo-medievalism helps explain why medieval themes continue to thrive in the modern world and how they are reshaped to reflect today's concerns.

In political theory about modern international relations, the term is originally associated with Hedley Bull. Political theory sees the political order of a globalized world as analogous to high-medieval Europe, in which neither states, nor the Church, nor other territorial powers, exercised full sovereignty. Instead, the institutions participated in complex, overlapping, and incomplete sovereignties.

In literary theory regarding the use and abuse of texts and tropes from the Middle Ages in postmodernity, the term neomedieval was popularized by the Italian medievalist Umberto Eco in his 1983 essay "Dreaming of the Middle Ages".

== Political theory ==
The idea of neomedievalism in political theory was first discussed in 1977 by theorist Hedley Bull in The Anarchical Society: A Study of Order in World Politics to describe the erosion of state sovereignty in the contemporary globalized world:

It is also conceivable that sovereign states might disappear and be replaced not by a world government but by a modern and secular equivalent of the kind of universal political organisation that existed in Western Christendom in the Middle Ages. In that system no ruler or state was sovereign in the sense of being supreme over a given territory and a given segment of the Christian population; each had to share authority with vassals beneath, and with the Pope and (in Germany and Italy) the Holy Roman Emperor above. The universal political order of Western Christendom represents an alternative to the system of states which does not yet embody universal government.

Thus Bull suggested society might move towards "a new mediaevalism" or a "neo-mediaeval form of universal political order", in which individual notions of rights and a growing sense of a "world common good" were undermining national sovereignty. He proposed that such a system might help "avoid the classic dangers of the system of sovereign states by a structure of overlapping structures and cross-cutting loyalties that hold all peoples together in a universal society while at the same time avoiding the concentration inherent in a world government", though "if it were anything like the precedent of Western Christendom, it would contain more ubiquitous and continuous violence and insecurity than does the modern states system".

In this reading, globalization has resulted in an international system which resembles the medieval one, where political authority was exercised by a range of non-territorial and overlapping agents, such as religious bodies, principalities, empires and city-states, instead of by a single political authority in the form of a state which has complete sovereignty over its territory. Comparable processes characterising Bull's "new medievalism" include the increasing powers held by regional organisations such as the European Union, as well as the spread of sub-national and devolved governments, such as those of Scotland and Catalonia. These challenge the exclusive authority of the state. Private military companies, multinational corporations and the resurgence of worldwide religious movements (e.g. political Islam) similarly indicate a reduction in the role of the state and a decentralisation of power and authority.

Stephen J. Kobrin in 1998 added the forces of the digital world economy to the picture of neomedievalism. In an article entitled "Back to the Future: Neomedievalism and the Postmodern Digital World Economy" in the Journal of International Affairs, he argued that the sovereign state as we know it – defined within certain territorial borders – is about to change profoundly, if not to wither away, due in part to the digital world economy created by the Internet, suggesting that cyberspace is a trans-territorial domain operating outside of the jurisdiction of national law.

Anthony Clark Arend also argued in his 1999 book Legal Rules and International Society that the international system is moving toward a "neo-medieval" system. He claimed that the trends that Bull noted in 1977 had become even more pronounced by the end of the twentieth century. Arend argues that the emergence of a "neo-medieval" system would have profound implications for the creation and operation of international law.

Although Bull originally envisioned neomedievalism as a positive trend, it has its critics. Bruce Holsinger in Neomedievalism, Neoconservatism, and the War on Terror argues that neoconservatives "have exploited neomedievalism's conceptual slipperiness for their own tactical ends." Similarly, Philip G. Cerny's "Neomedievalism, Civil War and the New Security Dilemma" (1998) also sees neomedievalism as a negative development and claims that the forces of globalization increasingly undermine nation-states and interstate forms of governance "by cross-cutting linkages among different economic sectors and social bonds," calling globalization a "durable disorder" which eventually leads to the emergence of the new security dilemmas that had analogies in the Middle Ages. Cerny identifies six characteristics of a neomedieval world that contribute to this disorder: multiple competing institutions; lack of exogenous territorializing pressures both on sub-national and international levels; uneven consolidation of new spaces, cleavages, conflicts and inequalities; fragmented loyalties and identities; extensive entrenchment of property rights; and spread of the "grey zones" outside the law as well as black economy.

== Medieval studies ==
An early use of the term neo-medievalism in a sense like Umberto Eco's was in Isaiah Berlin's 1953 "The Hedgehog and the Fox":

There is no kinship between him [Joseph de Maistre] and those who really did believe in the possibility of some kind of return – neo-medievalists from Wackenroder and Görres and Cobbett to G. K. Chesterton, and Slavophils and Distributists and Pre-Raphaelites and other nostalgic romantics; for he believed, as Tolstoy also did, in the exact opposite: in the "inexorable" power of the present moment: in our inability to do away with the sum of conditions which cumulatively determine our basic categories, an order which we can never fully describe or, otherwise than by some immediate awareness of it, come to know.

Then, in 1986, Umberto Eco said "we are at present witnessing, both in Europe and America, a period of renewed interest in the Middle Ages, with a curious oscillation between fantastic neomedievalism and responsible philological examination". Recently, the term has been used by various writers such as medieval historians who see it as the intersection between popular fantasy and medieval history as a term describing the post-modern study of medieval history. Umberto attempts to better visualize and distinguish differing influences, application and representations of neomedievalism, and crafted a list of ten characterizations or categories—"Ten Little Middle Ages"—, in which neomedievalism may be represented in modern mediums. This is in part due to how across neomedieval media, the representation of the medieval differs from one work to another—a spectrum—with those who value the more philological, or historical accuracy, and those who only wish to use the medieval as a pretext for their work.

The widespread interest of medieval themes in popular culture, such as, films and television, neo-medieval music, popular literature, and more recently, especially in computer games such as MMORPGs (e.g. Ubisoft's Assassin's Creed), has been called neomedieval. Critics have discussed why medieval themes continue to fascinate audiences in a modern, heavily technological world. A possible explanation is the need for a romanticized historical narrative to clarify the confusing panorama of current political and cultural events.

== Intersection of neomedievalism in political theory and medieval studies ==
Some commentators have used the terminological overlap between Hedley Bull's political theory of 'neomedievalism' and Umberto Eco's postmodernist theory of 'neomedievalism' to discuss how cultural discourses about the Middle Ages are used to political ends in the changing international order of the twenty-first century. A key proponent of this argument was Bruce Holsinger, who studied the use of orientalist and medievalist language in the discourse of the post-9/11 'war on terror', arguing that American neoconservatives had harnessed medievalism to win popular support for foreign policy and military actions that undermined state sovereignty and the international rule of law.

Working in Holsinger's wake, others have argued that neomedievalist popular culture, such as the video game The Elder Scrolls V: Skyrim, represents and so in turn helps to normalise a neomedievalist political order, and that states other than the US, for example Iceland, have also used medievalism as a source of soft power to help secure their place in the shifting post-9/11 world order.

In 2018 Jorge Majfud published the book Neomedievalism. Reflections on the Post-Enlightenment Era, in which he discussed the political and cultural aspects arising from the economy and finances of neo-feudalism in the United States.

== Studies ==
- Defining Neomedievalism(s) I, ed. by K. Fugelso, Studies in Medievalism, 19 (Cambridge: Brewer, 2010), ISBN 9781843842286
- Defining Neomedievalism(s) II, ed. by K. Fugelso, Studies in Medievalism, 20 (Cambridge: Brewer, 2011), ISBN 9781843842675
- Neo-Medievalism in the Media: Essays on Film, Television, and Electronic Games, ed. by Carol L. Robinson (Mellen, 2012), ISBN 9780773426627
- Comparative Neomedievalisms, ed. by Daniel Lukes, special issue of Postmedieval, 5.1 (Spring 2014)
- Neomedievalism, Popular Culture, and the Academy: From Tolkien to Game of Thrones, by KellyAnn Fitzpatrick (Cambridge: Brewer, 2019), ISBN 9781843845416
- U.S.-China Rivalry in a Neomedieval World: Security in an Age of Weakening States, by Timothy R. Heath, Weilong Kong, Alexis Dale-Huang (RAND Corporation, 2023), ISBN 978-1-9774-1097-9, doi:10.7249/RRA1887-1

== See also ==
- Westphalian sovereignty
- Neoliberalism
- English school of international relations theory
- Refeudalization
- Leo Strauss
