= Charles Manning (academic) =

South African academic (1894–1978)

Charles Anthony Woodward Manning (18 November 1894 – 10 March 1978) was a South African academic. He is considered to be a leading figure in the English School tradition of international relations scholarship.

== Early life and education ==
Charles was the son of Dumaresque Williamson Manning and Helena Isabella Bell. He was educated at the Diocesan College (Bishops), Rondebosch, the South African College, Cape Town; and as a Rhodes Scholar at Brasenose College, Oxford, which he entered in 1914. His academic career was interrupted by military service; he enlisted in the 18th Royal Fusilliers in 1914 and was commissioned in the 7th Oxford and Bucks Light Infantry in the following year. He saw active service in France and Salonkia, 1915–17, was wounded and twice mentioned in despatches. In 1917 and 1918, he served as an Acting Captain and Instructor in the 11th officer cadet battalion.

Returning to Oxford he graduated with a First in Literae humaniores ('Greats') in 1920, a First in Jurisprudence in 1921, and a First in Civil Law in 1922. He was Senior Hulme Scholar, 1921. He became a barrister in Middle Temple, 1922.

== Professional career ==
In 1922, he joined the League of Nations International Labour Office (Diplomatic Division) and in the same year was appointed Personal Secretary to the Secretary General, Sir Eric Drummond.

His academic career resumed in 1923 when he was appointed a Law Fellow at New College, Oxford, and Law Lecturer at both New and Pembroke Colleges. He moved to Harvard University as Laura Spellman Rockefeller Fellow, 1925–26, but returned to Oxford as Deputy Professor of International Law and Diplomacy in 1927. He was Examiner in Roman Law to the Council of Legal Education, 1927-32. In 1930, he was appointed Montague Burton (formerly Cassel) Professor of International Relations at the London School of Economics (which was under the federal University of London) in 1930, a post he held until his retirement in 1962. During the Second World War, he was Senior Specialist at Chatham House, a post he held from 1939-43.

== The politics of Apartheid ==
Professor H.G. Hanbury (19 June 1898 – 12 March 1993), a fellow academic lawyer, describes Manning's attitude as follows:

'From 1964 onwards he was chairman of the South Africa Society, and was a brave apologist for his own country. Though his patience must have been sometimes sorely tried by vitriolic attacks made on it, often by persons whose knowledge of it was scant, he was almost always courteous to its critics, and such was the regard in which his transparent sincerity was held, that never were attacks made personally on him.'

Manning's London School of Economics colleague, Professor F.S. Northedge (16 October 1918 – 3 March 1985), refers to Manning as 'a controversial writer on South Africa'. This remark is expanded with the comment that 'Manning always insisted, with some passion, that scientific detachment [in his academic role] did not, and must not, mean refusal to commit oneself to causes in the political area, when laboratory coat and academic gown are doffed, and Manning did commit himself to at least one such cause, that of South Africa and its regime. But scientific inquiry and political partisanship were at all times rigidly separated from each other in his mind, and only linked in so far as the political partisan, the committed voter in a democratic election or the professional politician, enact their chosen roles the better after serving their time as non-partisan students of the world in which their partisanship subsequently does its work.'

== Personal life ==
Manning married Marion Somerville (Maisie) Johnston, a former pupil, in 1939; Marion predeceased him in 1977. The couple had no children. He retired to South Africa in September 1977.

His recreations included watercolour, gardening, and music.
