= English school of international relations theory =

Theory of international relations

The English School of international relations theory (sometimes also referred to as liberal realism, the international society school or the British institutionalists) maintains that there is a 'society of states' at the international level, despite the condition of anarchy (that is, the lack of a global ruler or world state). The English school stands for the conviction that ideas, rather than simply material capabilities, shape the conduct of international politics, and therefore deserve analysis and critique. In this sense it is similar to constructivism, though the English School has its roots more in world history, international law and political theory, and is more open to normative approaches than is generally the case with constructivism.

== Overview ==
=== International system, international society, world society ===
English School scholars distinguish between international system and international society. The former is a quasi-physical realm, as proximate actors interact with one another. The latter is an intersubjective realm where actors are bound together through rules, norms and institutions.

==== International system ====
The classical English School starts with the realist assumption of an international system that forms as soon as two or more states have a sufficient amount of interaction. It underlines the English school tradition of realism and Machtpolitik (power politics) and puts international anarchy at the center of international relations theory. Hedley Bull defined the international system as being formed "when two or more have sufficient contact between them, and has sufficient impact on one another's decisions to cause them to behave as part of a whole."

==== International society ====
Hedley Bull, however, argued that states share a certain common interest (usually the "fear of unrestricted violence") that lead to the development of a certain set of "rules". He thus defined an international society as existent when:

…a group of states (or, more generally, a group of independent political communities) which not merely form a system, in the sense that the behaviour of each is a necessary factor in the calculations of the others, but also have established by dialogue and consent common rules and institutions for the conduct of their relations, and recognise their common interest in maintaining these arrangements.

In Bull's view, any type of society needed to have rules about restraints on the use of force, about the sanctity of agreements, and about property rights. Without elements of these three there would be no society.

These rules are expressed in a set of institutions that capture the normative structure of any international society. In the classical English School these were: war, the great powers, diplomacy, the balance of power, and international law, especially in the mutual recognition of sovereignty by states. To these could be added: territoriality, nationalism, the market, and human equality. Since these rules are not legally binding and there is no ordering institutions, speaking of norms would probably be more appropriate. States that respect these basic rules form an international society. Brown and Ainley therefore define the international society as a "norm-governed relationship whose members accept that they have at least limited responsibilities towards one another and the society as a whole". States thus follow their interests, but not at all costs. Another way of looking at this would be through Adam Watson's term 'raison de système', a counterpoint to 'raison d'état', and defined as 'the idea that it pays to make the system work'.

There are differing accounts, within the school, concerning the evolution of those ideas, some (like Martin Wight) arguing their origins can be found in the remnants of medieval conceptions of societas Christiana, and others such as Hedley Bull, in the concerns of sovereign states to safeguard and promote basic goals, especially their survival. Most English School understandings of international society blend these two together, maintaining that the contemporary society of states is partly the product of a common civilization - the Christian world of medieval Europe, and before that, the Roman Empire - and partly that of a kind of Lockean contract.

English School scholars vary in terms of the claims they make about the "thickness" of the culture of the international society is, as well as the content of international society.

==== World society ====
Based on a Kantian understanding of the world, the concept of world society takes the global population as a whole as basis for a global identity. However, Buzan also argued that the concept of World Society was the "Cinderella concept of English school theory", as it received almost no conceptual development.

=== Reexamination of traditional approaches ===
A great deal of the English School of thought concerns itself with the examination of traditional international theory, casting it — as Martin Wight did in his 1950s-era lectures at the London School of Economics — into three divisions (called by Barry Buzan as the English School's triad, based on Wight's three traditions):

1. Realist (or Hobbesian, after Thomas Hobbes) and thus the concept of international system
2. Rationalist (or Grotian, after Hugo Grotius), representing the international society
3. Revolutionist (or Kantian, after Immanuel Kant) representing world society.

In broad terms, the English School itself has supported the rationalist or Grotian tradition, seeking a middle way (or via media) between the 'power politics' of realism and the 'utopianism' of revolutionism.

Later Wight changed his triad into a four-part division by adding Mazzini.

The English School is largely a constructivist theory, emphasizing the non-deterministic nature of anarchy in international affairs that also draws on functionalism and realism. It has been argued that, "the English School embodies the notion of a middle course between practical demands and moral claims. In contrast to the realist approach, the English School maintains that states are not entangled in a permanent struggle for power and that they limit their conflicts through common rules, institutions and moral imperatives. Unlike the revolutionist tradition, the English School accepts the realist premise that the state is the primary reality of the international political system and maintains that these imperatives foreswear the replacement of the society of states by a universal community of mankind." In this manner, the English School succeeds in incorporating the salient elements of the main traditions of International Relations theory.

=== Internal divisions ===
The English School is often understood to be split into two main wings, named after two categories described by Hedley Bull:

- The pluralists argue that the diversity of humankind - their differing political and religious views, ethnic and linguistic traditions, and so on - is best contained within a society that allows for the greatest possible independence for states, which can, in their forms of government, express those differing conceptions of the 'good life'. This position is expressed most forcefully by the Canadian academic Robert Jackson, especially in The Global Covenant (2001).
- The solidarists, by contrast, argue that the society of states should do more to promote the causes of human rights and, perhaps, emancipation - as opposed to the rights of states to political independence and non-intervention in their internal affairs. This position may be located in the work on humanitarian intervention by, amongst others, Nicholas Wheeler, in Saving Strangers (2000).

There are, however, further divisions within the school. The most obvious is that between those scholars who argue the school's approach should be historical and normative (such as Robert Jackson or Tim Dunne) and those who think it can be methodologically 'pluralist', making use of 'positivist' approaches to the field (like Barry Buzan and Richard Little).

=== Affinities to others ===
The English School does have affinities:

- The pluralists have drawn from the classical 'political realism' of Hans Morgenthau, George Kennan
- The pluralists have also been influence by the underpinnings of Reinhold Niebuhr's Christian realism
- The solidarists have drawn from realist writers, such as Stanley Hoffmann

Contemporary English School and English School-adjacent writers draw from a variety of sources:

- from structural 'neorealism' of Kenneth Waltz, in the case of Barry Buzan;
- from social constructivism of Alexander Wendt, see Tim Dunne;
- from 'critical theorists' and the sociology of Norbert Elias, in that of Andrew Linklater;
- from the 'post-structuralism' of Michel Foucault, in the case of James Der Derian; and
- even from 'Global IR' and Postcolonialism, in the case of Amitav Acharya.

== History ==
The 'English-ness' of the school is questionable—many of its most prominent members are not English—and its intellectual origins are disputed. One view (that of Hidemi Suganami) is that its roots lie in the work of pioneering inter-war scholars like the South African Charles Manning, the founding professor of the Department of International Relations at the London School of Economics. Others (especially Tim Dunne and Brunello Vigezzi) have located them in the work of the British Committee on the Theory of International Politics, a group created in 1959 under the chairmanship of the Cambridge historian Herbert Butterfield, with financial aid from the Rockefeller Foundation. Both positions acknowledge the central role played by the theorists Martin Wight, Hedley Bull (an Australian teaching at the London School of Economics) and R J Vincent.

The name 'English School' was first coined by Roy Jones in an article published in the Review of International Studies in 1981, entitled "The English school – a case for closure". Some other descriptions—notably that of 'British institutionalists' (Hidemi Suganami)—have been suggested, but are not generally used. Throughout the development of the theory, the name became widely accepted, not least because it was developed almost exclusively at the London School of Economics, Cambridge and Oxford University.

== Criticisms ==
According to George Washington University political scientist Martha Finnemore, who notes that she is an admirer of the English School, the English School has not been received positively in American IR scholarship because there is a lack of clarity in the methods used in English School scholarship (for example, a lack of discussion about research design), as well as a lack of clarity in the theoretical claims made by the English School. She notes that the English School is reluctant to clarify its causal claims, which she contrasts with Constructivist research in the American IR tradition where there is an emphasis on constitutive causality – "how things are constituted makes possible other things (and in that sense causes them)". She also notes that the English School does not engage in hypothesis testing, and that their works mirror the detailed narratives of historians rather than typical works in the social sciences.

In a 1992 review of Martin Wight's work, Keohane criticized it, saying "Wight's greatest oversight ... is his neglect of the scientific or behavioral search for laws of action (or contingent generalizations) about world politics." This has been since considered a misunderstanding of Wight's epistemology and methodology by critics of Keohane, with Keohane and Wight sitting on distinct sides of the 'Rationalist'/'Reflectivist' divide.

== Key works ==
- Herbert Butterfield, Martin Wight (eds), Diplomatic Investigations (1966)
- Hedley Bull, The Anarchical Society (1977/1995)
- Martin Wight, Systems of States (1977)
- Martin Wight, Power Politics (1978)
- Bull, Hedley; Watson, Adam, eds. (1984). The Expansion of International Society. Clarendon Press. ISBN 978-0-19-821942-2.
- James Mayall, Nationalism and International Society (1990)
- Martin Wight, International Theory (1991)
- Adam Watson, (1992) The Evolution of International Society, London: Routledge.
- Tim Dunne, Inventing International Society: A History of the English School (Basingstoke: Macmillan, 1998)
- Robert Jackson, The Global Covenant: Human Conduct in a World of States (2000). Oxford: Oxford University Press.
- Nicholas J. Wheeler, Saving Strangers (2000)
- Barry Buzan, From International to World Society?: English School Theory and the Social Structure of Globalisation (2002)
- Nicolas Lewkowicz, The German Question and the International Order, 1943-48 (2010)
- Ian Clark, Legitimacy in International Society (2005)
- Edward Keene, Beyond the Anarchical Society: Grotius, Colonialism and Order in World Politics (Cambridge: Cambridge University Press, 2002)
- Kalevi Holsti, Taming the Sovereigns: Institutional Change in International Politics (2004). Cambridge University Press.
- Brunello Vigezzi, The British Committee on the Theory of International Politics (1954–1985): The Rediscovery of History (Milano: Edizioni Unicopli, 2005)
- Martin Wight, Four Seminal Thinkers in International Theory : Machiavelli, Grotius, Kant, and Mazzini (2005)
- Andrew Linklater and Hidemi Suganami, The English School of International Relations: A Contemporary Reassessment (Cambridge: Cambridge University Press: 2006)
- Andrew Hurrell, On Global Order: Power, Values, and the Constitution of International Society (Oxford: Oxford University Press, 2007)
- James Mayall, World Politics (2013)
- Barry Buzan, An Introduction to the English School of International Relations: The Societal Approach (2014). Cambridge, Polity.
- Williams, John, Ethics, Diversity, and World Politics: Saving Pluralism from Itself?. Oxford University Press, 2015.

== See also ==
- International community
- Global village
- World community
- Global politics
