= J. D. B. Miller =

Australian academic (1922–2011)

J. D. B. Miller FASSA
- Born: John Donald Bruce Miller; 30 August 1922; Sydney, Australia
- Died: 16 January 2011 (aged 88); Canberra, Australia
- Other name: Bruce Miller

John Donald Bruce Miller FASSA (30 August 1922 – 16 January 2011), known as Bruce Miller, was an Australian academic.

== Education ==
Miller was educated first at Bondi Public School and then at Sydney Boys High School, completing his education part time at the University of Sydney. Miller obtained his Masters of Economics in 1951. Miller then obtained his MA at the University of Cambridge.

== Career ==
In 1946 Miller joined the faculty of the University of Sydney. From the mid 50's to early 60's Miller was at the University of Leicester, first as foundation chair in politics, and later as dean of social sciences. Miller joined the Australian National University in 1962 in the Department of International Relations. Miller retired in 1987.

In 1963, Miller delivered the fifth in the annual series of ABC Boyer Lectures on "Australian and Foreign Policy".

== Personal ==
Miller was born on 30 August 1922 in Sydney, son of Donald and Marian Miller. Miller was married three times and had two sons. He died in Canberra on 16 January 2011.

== Honours and awards ==
- 1967 Elected Fellow of the Academy of the Social Sciences in Australia
