= Ian Clark (political scientist) =

British scholar

Ian Clark, FBA, FLSW (born 14 March 1949) is a British scholar of international relations, who is currently Emeritus Professor of International Politics at Aberystwyth University. Prior to this, he taught at the University of Western Australia and the University of Cambridge.
