= Llewellyn Woodward =

British historian (1890–1971)

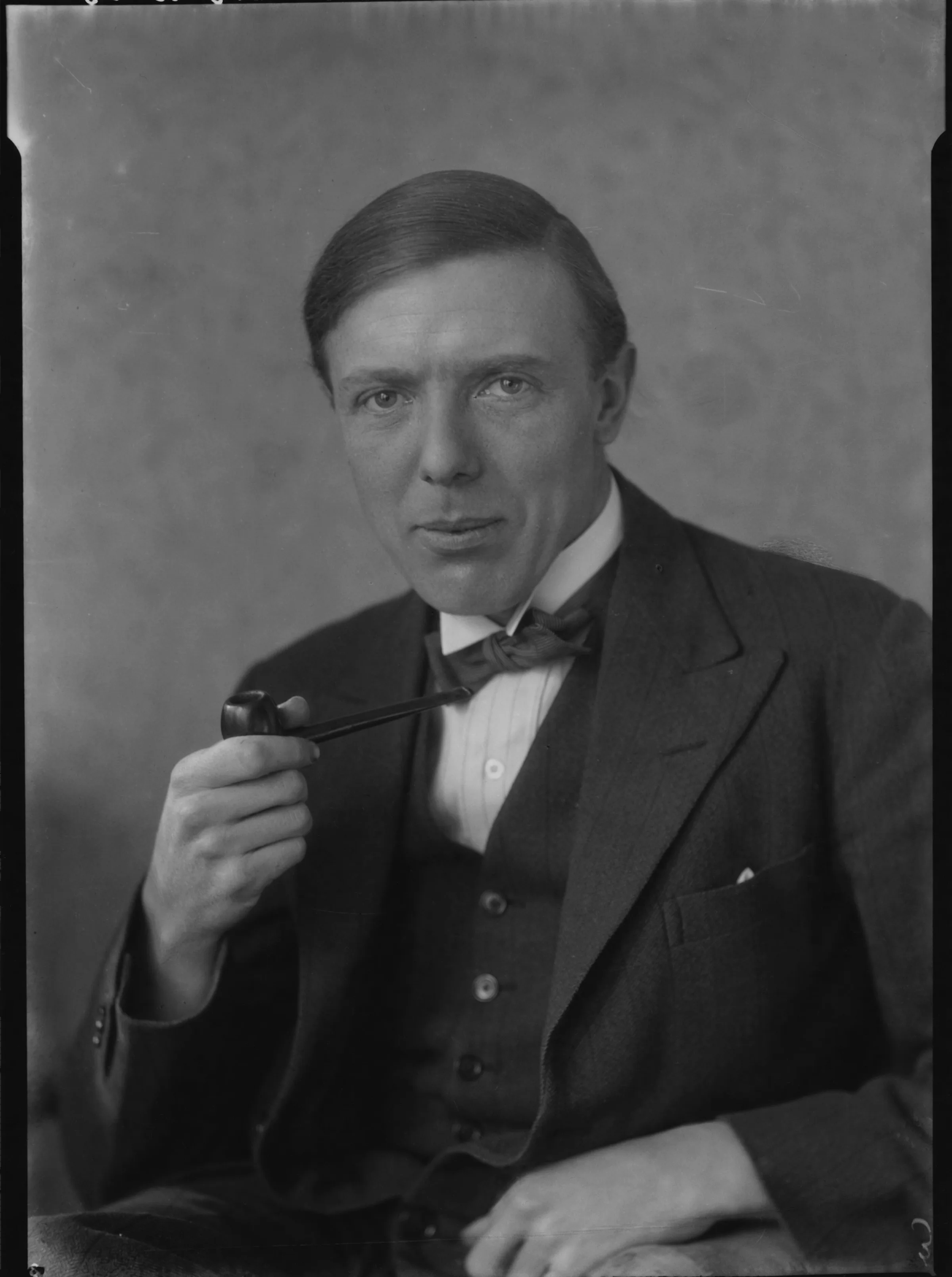
Woodward in 1928

Sir Ernest Llewellyn Woodward, FBA (1890–1971) was a British historian. He was educated at Merchant Taylors' School and Corpus Christi College, Oxford, and after the First World War became a lecturer in Modern History and fellow of All Souls College from 1919 to 1944 and a fellow at New College from 1922 to 1939. Later he was Montague Burton Professor of International Relations (1944–1947) and then Professor of Modern History at Oxford. He later taught at Princeton University in the United States (1951–1962).

His scope was impressively wide, his first publication being on the late Roman Empire whilst on sick leave from service in the First World War but his most famous works being on the First World War. He wrote The Age of Reform in the Oxford History of England.

Woodward was a Member of the American Philosophical Society in 1949.

== Bibliography ==
- Great Britain and the German Navy (Oxford: Clarendon Press, 1935)
- The Age of Reform, 1815–1870 (Clarendon Press, 1938) online
- Short Journey [autobiography] (Faber and Faber, 1942)
- British Historians (1943) online
- The Study of International Relations at a University: An Inaugural Lecture (Clarendon Press, 1945)
- History of England - Home Study Series - (Methuen, 1947)
- British Foreign Policy in the Second World War (HM Stationery Office, 1962) online
- Three studies in European conservatism: Metternich, Guizot, the Catholic Church in the nineteenth century (1963) online
- War and peace in Europe, 1815-1870, and other essays (1963) online
- "The Study of Contemporary History." Journal of Contemporary History (1966) 1#1 pp: 1–13. in JSTOR
- Great Britain and the War of 1914–1918 (Beacon Press, 1970)
- Prelude to modern Europe, 1815–1914 (1972) online
