= Michael Taylor (political scientist) =

Michael Taylor (born 1942) is professor-emeritus at the University of Washington.

Taylor completed his PhD at the University of Essex in the United Kingdom. He has taught at Essex and at Yale University and has held visiting positions at the Center for Advanced Study at Stanford University, the Netherlands Institute of Advanced Studies, the Institute of Advanced Studies in Vienna, the European University Institute in Florence, and at the Australian National University in Canberra.

== Published works ==
He is the author of Anarchy and Cooperation (John Wiley and Sons, 1976), Community, Anarchy and Liberty (Cambridge, 1982), The Possibility of Cooperation (Cambridge, 1987), Rationality and Revolution, (co-author and editor, Cambridge, 1988) and Rationality and the Ideology of Disconnection (Cambridge, 2006).
