= Datengoku Sensen =

Single by Ali Project
- B-side: "Takarajima"
- Released: October 21, 2009
- Recorded: 2009
- Genre: Neoclassical
- Length: 17:29
- Label: Mellow Head

Ali Project singles chronology
"Senritsu no Kodomotachi" (2009)	"Datengoku Sensen" (2009)	"Ranse Eroica" (2010)

"Datengoku Sensen" (堕天國宣戦; "Corrupted Kingdom of Heaven War Declaration") is Ali Project's 26th single. This single was released as a CD on 21 October 2009 under Mellow Head, a sublabel of Lantis, an anime music company.

The single title was used as the opening theme for the anime series Tatakau Shisho: The Book of Bantorra.

== Track listing ==
#	Track name	Romaji
01	堕天國宣戦	Datengoku Sensen
02	寶島	Takarajima
03	堕天國宣戦 -Instrumental-	Datengoku Sensen -Instrumental-
04	寶島 -Instrumental-	Takarajima -Instrumental-

== Charts and sales ==
Oricon Ranking (Weekly)	Sales	Time in Chart
19	9,297	5 weeks
