= Andrew Hurrell =

Andrew James Hurrell, FBA (born 2 February 1955) is a leading British scholar of international relations. He is currently a senior research fellow at Balliol College, Oxford, having previously been Montague Burton Professor of International Relations from 2008 to 2021.

== Biography ==
Hurrell was educated at Gresham's School, St John's College, Cambridge (MA), and St Antony's College, Oxford (MPhil, DPhil). He was a research fellow at Christ Church, Oxford, from 1983 to 1986, an assistant professor of international relations at the Bologna Centre of the School of Advanced International Studies of Johns Hopkins University (now known as The Johns Hopkins University SAIS Europe) from 1986 to 1989.

In 1989, Hurrell became a lecturer in international relations at the University of Oxford from 1989 to 2008, where he was a fellow of Nuffield College, Oxford. In 2008, he was elected Montague Burton Professor of International Relations and became a fellow of Balliol College, Oxford. He was also a Delegate of Oxford University Press and a member of its Finance Committee.

He has held visiting positions at the University of São Paulo, the University of Brasilia, the Fundação Getúlio Vargas, New York University, the Free University of Berlin, the Kollegforschungsgruppe in Berlin, and Humboldt University of Berlin.

In 2011, Hurrell was elected a fellow of the British Academy. In 2015, he was the recipient of the Susan Strange Award from the International Studies Association.

== Research ==
His research interests cover theories of international relations; theories of global governance; the history of thought on international relations; comparative regionalism; and the international relations of the Americas, with particular reference to Brazil. In a recent survey of International Relations teaching and research in 20 countries he was one of only two non-US scholars listed as having produced the most interesting scholarship over the past five years.

Hurrell is an expert on Brazil and has authored a large number of works on Latin American politics. He is a leading theorist of the 'International Society' approach pioneered at the London School of Economics (LSE) and Oxford by Hedley Bull, and has published widely on a vast range of international issues, from the United Nations and humanitarian intervention to international law. His current research project involves comparing the policies and outlooks of emerging regional powers such as Brazil and India, asking what their role in the shifting world order is likely to be.

His current work focuses on emerging powers and the globalization of international society and what this means for ideas and practices of global order, for IR theory, and for international normative theory. Collaborative projects include concerts of power in the 21st century; provincializing Westphalia; and ASEAN integration through law. On the topic of globalization, he has recorded an interview at the Einstein Foundation Berlin on how to correspond to it politically. He is also completing a short introduction to global governance.

== Selected publications ==
- (edited with Benedict Kingsbury), International Politics of the Environment: Actors, Interests, and Institutions (Clarendon Press, 1992)
- (edited with Louise Fawcett), Regionalism in World Politics: Regional Organization and International Order (Oxford University Press, 1995)
- (edited with Ngaire Woods), Inequality, Globalization, and World Politics (Oxford University Press, 1999)
- (edited with Kai Alderson), Hedley Bull On International Society (Macmillan, 2000)
- (edited with Rosemary Foot and John Lewis Gaddis), Order and Justice in International Relations (Oxford University Press, 2003)
- On Global Order. Power, Values, and the Constitution of International Society (Oxford University Press, 2007), winner of International Studies Association Prize for Best Book in the field of International Relations
