= Andrew Linklater =

British academic (1949–2023)

- Born: 3 August 1949; Aberdeen, Scotland
- Died: 5 March 2023 (aged 73); Aberystwyth, Wales
- Scientific career
- Fields: International relations theorist
- Thesis: Obligations beyond the state: the individual, the state and humanity in international theory (1978)
- Doctoral advisor: Michael Donelan and Paul Taylor

Andrew Linklater FAcSS (3 August 1949 – 5 March 2023) was a British scholar of international relations and political theorist who taught at universities in Australia and the United Kingdom. In 2000, he was featured as one of the fifty thinkers in Martin Griffith's Fifty Key Thinkers in International Relations.

== Early life and education ==
Linklater was born on 3 August 1949 to Andrew Linklater and Isabella née Forsyth. His father was a postman and his mother worked various odd jobs. He studied Politics and International Relations as an undergraduate at the University of Aberdeen, and worked as a bus driver while he studied. He then received an MA degree from the University of Aberdeen in 1971, a BPhil degree from Balliol College, University of Oxford in 1973, and a PhD degree from the London School of Economics in 1978. His PhD thesis was titled Obligations beyond the state: the individual, the state and humanity in international theory, and was later published as Men and Citizens in the Theory of International Relations.

== Teaching ==
His teaching career began at the University of Tasmania from 1976 to 1981, before moving to Monash University in 1982, where he taught for ten years. In 1993, he became professor of international relations at Keele University, and became Dean of Postgraduate Affairs in 1997 until he left Keele in 1999. In January 2000 he joined the Department of International Politics at Aberystwyth as the Woodrow Wilson Professor of International Politics.

== Perspectives on international relations ==
Until around the turn of the millennium, Linklater could be characterized as a scholar of the critical theory paradigm within international relations. In his 1990 piece, Beyond Realism and Marxism, he outlined flaws in realist international relations theory, the English School, and Marxist international relations theory. Linklater argued for international relations theorists to take a more expansive approach to the relevant actors, which includes forces that generate human norms and structure human relations between societies, beyond the class framework of Marxism. However, since the 2000s, he moved decisively to championing the relevance of the work of Norbert Elias on the study of international relations. His later books, including The Problem of Harm in World Politics: Theoretical Investigations (2011) and The Idea of Civilization and the Making of the Global Order (2021) show his close connections with the 'figurational sociology' school associated with Elias.

== Research ==
Linklater wrote and edited several books on International Relations, but one of his most important works is The Transformation of Political Community. Published in 1998, it was hailed by fellow academics Chris Brown and Steve Smith as "one of the most important books in international theory published in this decade". Linklater's research interests included the idea of harm in International Relations and critical theories of International Relations. In 2001 he became a member of the Academy of Learned Societies in the Social Sciences, and in 2005 he also became a Fellow of the British Academy. He was also a Founding Fellow of the Learned Society of Wales.

== Personal life ==
Linklater married a fellow Aberdonian, Jane Adam. Andrew Linklater died on 5 March 2023, at the age of 73.

== Publications ==
- The Problem of Harm in World Politics: Theoretical Investigations, Cambridge University Press, 2011.
- Critical Theory and World Politics: Citizenship, sovereignty and humanity, Routledge, 2007.
- The English School of International Relations: A Contemporary Assessment (with Hidemi Suganami), Cambridge University Press, 2006.
- Theories of International Relations (edited with Scott Burchill), Palgrave Macmillan, 2013. (Now on its fifth edition, originally published in 1996)
- Political Loyalty and the Nation-State (edited with Michael Waller), Routledge, 2003.
- International Relations: Critical Concepts in Political Science, Routledge, 2000
- The Transformation of Political Community: Ethical Foundations of the Post-westphalian Era, Polity Press, 1998.
- Boundaries in Question: New Directions in International Relations, (edited with John MacMillan) Frances Pinter, 1995.
- Beyond Realism and Marxism: Critical Theory and International Relations, MacMillan Press, 1990.
- New Horizons in Politics: Essays with an Australian Focus, (edited with Hugh V. Emy), Allen and Unwin, 1990.
- Men and Citizens in the Theory of International Relations, MacMillan Press, 1982.
- New Dimensions in World Politics, (edited with G. Goodwin) Croom Helm, 1975.
