= Oliver Sensen =

German philosopher

- Awards: Mellon Foundation's Young Humanist Fund; Graduate Studies Student Association’s award

Education
- Education: Cambridge University
- Thesis: Freedom and the Categorical Imperative: Kant's Conception of Human Dignity (2004)
- Doctoral advisor: Onora O'Neill and Simon Blackburn

Philosophical work
- Era: 21st-century philosophy
- Region: Western philosophy
- School: Kantian philosophy
- Institutions: Tulane University
- Main interests: Modern philosophy, Ethics

Oliver Sensen is a German philosopher and associate professor of Philosophy at Tulane University. He is known for his expertise on Kantian philosophy. Sensen is the vice-president of North American Kant Society.

== Books ==
- Human Dignity, Cambridge University Press, forthcoming
- Kant on Human Dignity, de Gruyter, 2011; paperback, 2016
- Kant on Moral Autonomy (ed.), Cambridge University Press, 2012
- Respect (ed.), Oxford University Press, forthcoming
- The Emergence of Autonomy in Kant's Moral Theory (ed.), Cambridge University Press, 2018
- Kant's Lectures on Ethics: A Critical Guide (ed.), Cambridge University Press, 2015
- Kant's Tugendlehre. A Commentary (ed.), de Gruyter, 2012
