= Nicholas J. Wheeler =

British academic

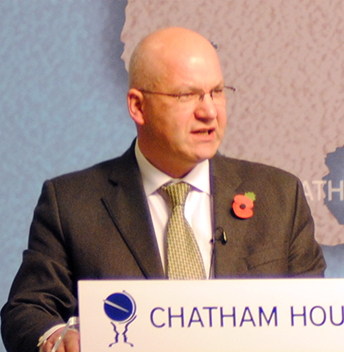
Wheeler delivering the Martin Wight memorial lecture at Chatham House in 2012

Nicholas J. Wheeler FLSW (born 7 April 1962) is professor of international politics at the University of Birmingham and co-editor (with Christian Reus-Smit) of the Cambridge Studies in International Relations book series, published by Cambridge University Press and the British International Studies Association. Wheeler specializes in security studies and has focused his research on the security dilemma and humanitarian intervention.

Wheeler received his BA from Staffordshire University and his MA and PhD from the University of Southampton. He has taught at Aberystwyth University and the University of Hull and served as director of the David Davies Memorial Institute of International Studies. He is also a member of the United Nations Association of the United Kingdom's policy advisory committee and served as a trustee of the Welsh Centre for International Affairs. Wheeler is currently a professor at the University of Birmingham.

Wheeler is the author or co-author of three books and the co-editor of three additional books. He is also the author of numerous articles in journals including International Affairs, Millennium: Journal of International Studies, and International Political Science Review.

In 2011, Wheeler was elected a Fellow of the Learned Society of Wales.
