= Human Terrain System =

US Army support program

- Active: February 2007 – September 2014
- Country: United States
- Part of: TRADOC
- HQ/Project Office: Newport News, Virginia
- Equipment: Mapping the Human Terrain Toolkit (MAP-HT)
- Website: HTS official website

The Human Terrain System (HTS) was a United States Army, Training and Doctrine Command (TRADOC) support program employing personnel from the social science disciplines – such as archaeology, anthropology, sociology, political science, historians, regional studies, and linguistics – to provide military commanders and staff with an understanding of the local population (i.e. the "human terrain") in the regions in which they were deployed.

The concept of HTS was first developed in a paper by Montgomery McFate and Andrea Jackson in 2005, which proposed a pilot version of the project as a response to "identified gaps in [US military] commanders' and staffs' understanding of the local population and culture", such as became particularly visible during the US invasion of Iraq and Afghanistan. HTS was subsequently launched as a proof-of-concept program, run by the United States Army Training and Doctrine Command (TRADOC), in February 2007, with five HTS teams deployed between Iraq and Afghanistan. Since 2007, HTS has grown from a program with five deployed teams and a $20 million two-year budget to one with 31 deployed teams and a $150 million annual budget. HTS became a permanent US Army program in 2010.

Ever since its launch, HTS has been surrounded by controversy. While the program initially received positive coverage in the US media, it quickly became the subject of heavy criticism – particularly from anthropologists, but also from journalists, military officials and HTS personnel and former personnel. Most notably, on 31 October 2007, the executive board of the American Anthropological Association (AAA) published a statement opposing HTS as an "unacceptable application of anthropological expertise" that conflicted with the AAA's Code of Ethics. Following the publication of a report on HTS by the Commission on Engagement of Anthropology with the US Security and Intelligence Services (CEAUSSIC) in 2009, the AAA released a further statement of disapproval, which they re-iterated in 2012 after rumours that the controversy had died down.

The program evolved into a mechanism for supporting security force assistance. The program ended operations on 30 September 2014.

== Background ==
In the most immediate sense, HTS was developed as a response to concerns about mismanagement of US military operations in Iraq and Afghanistan, and, in particular, to the negative effects of recognized "deficiencies" in US military "cultural understanding" of these countries. In 2006 the Human Terrain System was launched by the Pentagon, the headquarters of the United States Department of Defense. However, military analysts and academics have also suggested earlier historical contexts for the program's development.

=== CORDS: a US military precedent ===
A number of military officials have invoked Civil Operations and Rural Development Support (CORDS) – a counterinsurgency program developed by the US military during the Vietnam War – as a precedent for HTS. In a foundational article on HTS, a group of military analysts, Kipp et al, described the program as "a CORDS for the 21st Century". Their article appraised CORDS as a successful and effective program that was "premised on a belief that the war would ultimately be won or lost not on the battlefield, but in the struggle for the loyalty of the people". Kipp et al contended that the only major problems with the CORDS program were that it lacked adequate reachback facilities and that it "was started too late and ended too soon". As such, they argued that it provided "many important lessons" to "guide" the development of HTS as an "effective cultural intelligence program" that could "support tactical and operational-level commanders today". By contrast, critics of HTS have drawn attention to the fact that, in Vietnam, CORDS was run in conjunction with the Phoenix Program, which used information gathered through CORDS in its effort to "neutralize" (by means of assassination, infiltration and capture) supporters of the Viet Cong.

=== History of the concept of "human terrain" ===
The concept of "human terrain" has been defined in military documents pertaining to HTS as "the human population in the operational environment ... as defined and characterized by sociocultural, anthropologic and ethnographic data and other non-geographical information". According to Roberto J. Gonzalez (Associate Professor of Anthropology at San Jose State University, and one of the most vocal critics of HTS), this concept can be traced back to a 1968 report by the House Un-American Activities Committee (HUAC) about "the perceived threat of the Black Panthers and other militant groups". He argues that the concept gradually gained in popularity and usage, in the military and elsewhere, through the writing of military officials, such as Ralph Peters, and pundits, such as Max Boot.

=== History of anthropological engagement with the military ===
Commentators on HTS have also drawn attention to the long history of anthropological involvement in military operations in the US and Europe, though for different reasons. In a 2005 article, Montgomery McFate (HTS's Senior Social Scientist from 2007 to 2010, and an anthropologist by training) argued that anthropology was born as a "warfighting discipline", having served in its early history as "the handmaiden of colonialism". She suggested that anthropology had retreated "into the Ivory Tower" following the Vietnam War, and contended that anthropologists should become involved in developing "military applications of cultural knowledge". Neil L. Whitehead (Professor of Anthropology at the University of Wisconsin–Madison) likewise argued that the "collaboration" between anthropological theory and colonial practice was "nothing new", but went on to suggest that this history – and particularly recent developments such as HTS and the Minerva Initiative – should prompt a critical re-assessment and transformation of anthropological methodology.

=== The "cultural turn" in the US Army ===
A number of commentators on HTS have described the program as part of a "cultural turn" in US military policy, particularly pertaining to the war on terror. According to commentators, this "cultural turn" has been characterized by an increasing strategic emphasis on the use of "cultural knowledge"; the promotion and funding of a growing number of "cultural knowledge" projects in the US Army and National Security services, such as HTS, the Minerva Initiative, and the Pat Roberts Intelligence Scholars Program; and the preference of "gentler" approaches to counterinsurgency that prioritize efforts directed towards "winning hearts and minds" over "kinetic" actions (i.e. the use of military force).

== History and recent developments ==
=== Chronological history of developments in HTS ===
The beginnings of HTS can be traced to a pilot proposal for a "Pentagon Office of Operational Cultural Knowledge", published in 2005 by Montgomery McFate and Andrea Jackson. In July 2005, the Foreign Military Studies Office (FMSO) initiated an HTS pilot project (named Cultural Operations Research – Human Terrain System, or COR-HTS), which was headed up by Captain Don Smith, and housed at the Training and Doctrine Command in Fort Leavenworth. The pilot lasted until August 2006. In July 2006, Colonel Steve Fondacaro (retired) was hired by TRADOC to transition the pilot into an active program. In October 2006, Jacob Kipp and colleagues outlined the Human Terrain System in an official FMSO public press release.

HTS began recruiting in early 2007. In February 2007, the first team was deployed to Afghanistan. Further teams were deployed to Iraq in the summer of that year. Originally, HTS project leaders McFate and Fondacaro had planned for the program to run at a small scale (five teams: two in Afghanistan, three in Iraq) for two years. However, in response to a Joint Urgent Operational Needs Statement (JUONS) from Central Command issued in April 2007, calling for an HTS Team in every Army Brigade and Marine Corps Regiment in Iraq and Afghanistan, the US Defense Secretary, Robert M. Gates, authorized a $40 million expansion of the program in September 2007. The JUONS demanded a 420 per cent expansion of HTS, from the existing five teams to twenty-six teams divided between Iraq and Afghanistan. McFate and Fondacaro referred to this as a "catastrophic success", meaning that "while the boost from the DOD (Department of Defense) was gratifying, fulfilling the mandate would stretch a new organization to the limit".

Following the public statement of disapproval from the AAA, and significant media coverage of the controversy surrounding HTS, the United States Congress issued an order for an independent assessment of HTS to be undertaken by the Center for Naval Analyses (CNA) in September 2009. In May 2010, the House Armed Services Committee (HASC) temporarily limited the Army's funding obligation towards the program while this assessment was completed. The CNA report, which contained the results of interviews with 19 out of 71 commanders supported by HTS, was completed in October 2010. It was subsequently published on the Defense Technical Information Center (DTIC) website in February 2011, but withdrawn from the website shortly after.

In 2010, HTS was approved by the US Army and became a permanent Army program. In June 2010, Maxie McFarland, the Deputy Chief of Staff for Intelligence at TRADOC, terminated Fondacaro's temporary position as HTS Program Manager. Colonel Sharon Hamilton was appointed as his replacement. McFate also left HTS in 2010.

On 8 March 2011, the Center for Complex Operations at the National Defense University hosted a conference titled Inter-agency Human Terrain Program and Requirements. The Center stated that the aims of the conference were to "improve understanding of human terrain information and analysis and of how it is currently being used"; to discuss the "effectiveness" of HTS; and to discuss ethical and legal issues associated with the program. In June 2011, AFRICOM requested and launched a pilot HTS program. In December 2011, Colonel Hamilton reported that the US Central Command had issued a requirement for an increase of 9 HTS teams in Afghanistan by summer 2012, to bring the total number of teams in Afghanistan up to 31.

In 2012, HTS officials began prioritizing HTS involvement in "Phase Zero" or, in other words, the earliest, "prevention of conflict" stage of a military campaign. In April 2012, Defense News reported that the Director of HTS, Colonel Sharon Hamilton, had been "working on a plan" to expand the use of HTS into other regions such as Africa and Latin America, and was considering whether HTS personnel could be deployed in Mexico to support military counter-narcotic work. In August 2012, Hamilton retired from HTS and from the US Army, and was replaced as Director by Colonel Steve Bentley. In October 2013, Colonel Bentley was replaced by Colonel Thomas Georges.

As part of the ongoing drawdown from Afghanistan in 2013–2014, the Army programmed HTS funding to drop proportionately, eliminating human terrain teams as units were removed from theater. By September 2014, all HTS teams and personnel had been withdrawn from Afghanistan. Contract and personnel support to the program ceased at the end of the month, effectively ending the program's operations as of 1 October 2014. However, money was still allocated for the program in FY 2015.

=== Notable operations ===
==== Operation Khyber ====
During a 15-day operation in the late summer of 2007, 500 Afghan and 500 US soldiers were deployed to clear an estimated 200 to 250 Taliban insurgents out of Paktia Province, secure southeastern Afghanistan's most important road, and halt a string of suicide attacks on US troops and local governors. During the operation, an HTS anthropologist, Tracy St. Benoit, identified an unusually high concentration of widows in poverty, creating pressure on their sons to join the well-paid insurgents. Citing St. Benoit's advice, US officers developed a job training program for the widows. She also interpreted the beheading of a local tribal elder as an effort to divide and weaken the Zadran, rather than as a more general attempt at intimidation. As a result, Afghan and US officials focused on uniting the Zadran, one of southeastern Afghanistan's most powerful tribes, as a way of hindering the Taliban's operations in the area.

==== Operation Maiwand ====
800 Afghan soldiers, 400 US soldiers and 200 Afghan policemen took part in Operation Maiwand, in which Afghan soldiers raided houses of suspected militants. Stars and Stripes reported that in one Pashtun village, Kuz Khadokhel, the Human Terrain Team (HTT) made it possible for negotiator Captain Aaron White to understand body language in the context of the culture, to identify leaders during negotiations, and to reinforce a perception of leadership by not conferring with fellow officers and by demonstrating good faith through projects facilitated by the Ghazni Provincial Reconstruction Team (PRT), which included roads, a visit by the PRT's mobile medical clinic, the construction of a deep well for irrigation, and the beginnings of a road to Afghanistan's main Highway 1.

=== Deaths ===
Michael V. Bhatia, a member of HTT AF1, was killed along with two other soldiers by an IED (Improvised Explosive Device) while riding in a Humvee in Khost, Afghanistan in May 2008.

Nicole Suveges, a member of HTT IZ3, was killed on 24 June 2008, along with 11 other soldiers, Iraqi government officials and United States Embassy personnel when a bomb exploded at the District Council building in Sadr City.

On 4 November 2008, HTS member Paula Loyd was fatally injured whilst surveying the village of Chehel Gazi with a US Army platoon. She was doused with gasoline disguised in a jar of cooking oil and lit on fire by Abdul Salam, an Afghan national. Loyd was severely burned over 60 percent of her body. Salam was captured by Don. M Ayala (another member of HTS) and other US Army personnel almost immediately after the attack, as he tried to escape. About ten minutes later, after learning of the severity of Loyd's injuries, Ayala shot Salam in the head, killing him instantly. Loyd, 36, died at Brooke Army Medical Center in San Antonio on 7 January 2009. Ayala pleaded guilty to voluntary manslaughter in federal court in Alexandria, Virginia in February 2009. On 8 May 2009, he was sentenced to five years probation and a $12,500 fine. On 1 September 2010, the Times-Picayune of Louisiana posted a documentary video of friends and family speaking in support of Ayala at sentencing.

== Design and organizational structure ==
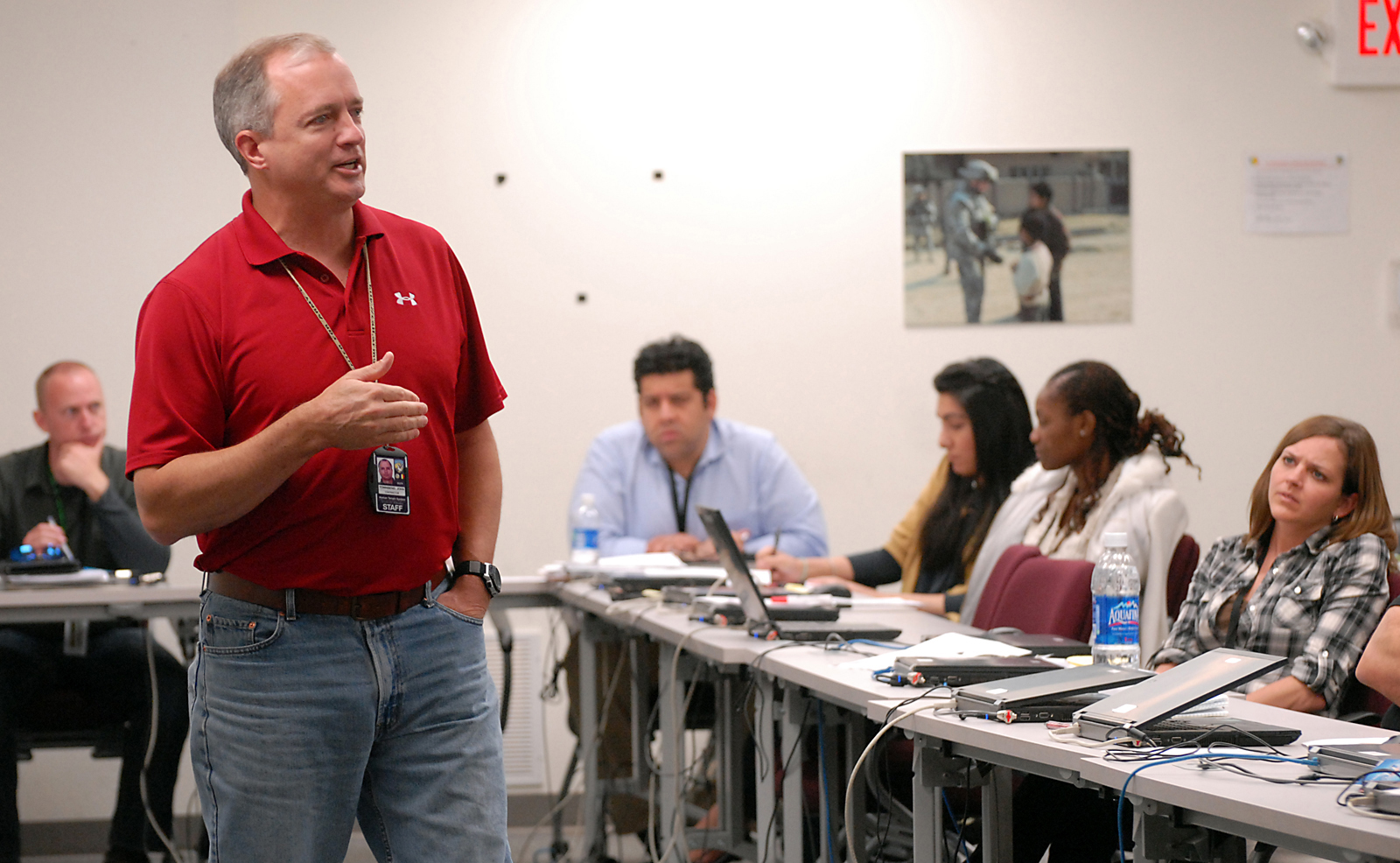
An HTS senior seminar leader provides feedback to Human Terrain Teams at Fort Leavenworth in May 2010

=== Role of HTS in the US Army ===
HTS is defined as an "intelligence enabling capability", and is categorized as "Intelligence support activity". According to the HTS website, the aim of the program is to "provide sociocultural teams to commanders and staff" in the US Army in order to "improve the understanding of the local population", and to "apply this understanding to the Military Decision Making Process (MDMP)". The website also argues that the program was designed to address an identified "operational need" in the US Army for "sociocultural support".

=== HTS components ===
HTS has two main components: an institutional component referred to as the "Army Enduring Base", and an operational component referred to as "Deployed Teams". Both components include numerous sub-divisions.

==== Army Enduring Base ====
===== Project Office =====
The Project Office is based in Newport News and is composed of the Director, the deputy director, and Project staff (including human resources, social scientists, knowledge management, and information technology (IT) teams).

===== Reachback Research Center (RRC) =====
The RRC is a Continental United States (CONUS)-based research and analysis program that provides support to deployed HTTs, HTATs, and TCEs. It is made up of a combination of social scientists, military analysts and civilian analysts who are organized into teams that specialize in research in a particular geographical region. RRC personnel are responsible for supplying information from open source and classified sources to deployed HTS teams, and for continuously updating HTS databases.

===== HTS training =====
HTS training is based at Fort Leavenworth in Kansas. Training focuses on field research methods, staff planning and procedures, and equipment training.

==== Deployed teams ====
===== Human Terrain Teams (HTT) =====
Human Terrain Teams (HTT) work at the brigade or regimental level of the US Army. They undertake research among the local population, and represent that population (referred to as the "human terrain") in the various stages of military operations: planning, preparation, execution, and assessment. Human Terrain Teams contain 5–6 members and consist of a Team Leader, who is a principal adviser and is responsible for the entire team; one or two Social Scientists, who are responsible for conducting and managing ethnographic and social-science research for the brigade staff's area of operations; one Research Manager, who is responsible for integrating the HTT's research into their military unit's intelligence collection effort and interacting with other agencies and organizations; and one or two Human Terrain Analysts, who have specific local knowledge and act as the primary human terrain data researcher. HTTs are responsible for providing a constantly updated, user-friendly ethnographic and socio-cultural database of the area of operations that comprises data maps showing specific ethnographic or cultural features; raising points on cultural or ethnographic issues of specific concern to the unit commander; and sustaining a connection with RRC.

===== Human Terrain Analysis Teams (HTAT) =====
Human Terrain and Analysis Teams provide support to echelons of the US Army that are above brigade or regimental level (e.g., division or regional command). They form a part of the Commander's staff and are responsible for analyzing the information provided by HTTs in order to support the Commander's Military Decision Making Process (MDMP). HTATs are made up of one Team Leader, one or two Social Scientists, one or two Research Managers, and one or two Human Terrain Analysts.

===== Theater Coordination Elements (TCE) =====
TCEs are made up of a mixture of military and civilian staff. They are responsible for providing sociocultural support to the military staff and commanders of a particular operational region or theater. A TCE comprises one Team Leader, three Social Scientists, one or two Research Managers, and one or two Human Terrain Analysts.

===== Theater Support Office (TSO) =====
TSOs are responsible for providing administrative and logistics support to HTTs in a particular operational region or theater. They are made up of one Theater Support Officer and a variably-sized support team.

===== Social Science Research and Analysis (SSRA) =====
SSRA is responsible for liaising with indigenous polling organizations and small or medium-sized enterprises (SMEs) in order to gather data and information from the local population. This information is then passed on to the TCE.

=== Methods ===
The HTS program focuses on mapping the "human terrain" (i.e. the local population in an area in which military are deployed). In order to do this, HTTs create databases of information about local leaders, tribes or social groups, political disputes, economic issues, and social problems. This information is then analyzed by HTATs, used to advise military staff and commanders, and used to inform the Military Decision Making Process (MDMP). Collected data is compiled and stored in a larger archive in order to be accessible for the military and other government agencies.

=== Equipment ===
HTS has developed the MAP-HT Toolkit, an integrated software suite provided to HTTs for data visualization and reporting. This includes software for mapping (of the spatial distribution of social groups, for example), and for producing link charts (of power structures and social networks in informal economies, for example) and timelines. Components in the toolkit include: ANTHROPAC, UCINET, Axis PRO, i2 Analyst's Notebook, and TerraExplorer, a 3D earth visualization application provided by Skyline Software Systems.

=== Funding ===
The initial funding for the Human Terrain System came from the Joint Improvised Explosive Device Defeat Organization (JIEDDO). The JIEDDO funding of $20 million, granted in the summer 2006, supported the pilot HTS project from mid-2006 to 2007. Following the Central Command JUONS request for the major and rapid expansion of HTS in April 2007, the Defense Secretary approved a $40 million expansion of HTS to be funded by the Department of Defense (DOD). DOD provided HTS funding until 2009 when funding responsibilities were assumed by Army G2 (i.e., the Army's Military Intelligence budget). In 2009 it was reported that the annual budget for the program was $143 million. In May 2010 the HASC temporarily limited the funding obligation to HTS until the Army submitted an assessment of the program that addressed concerns that had been raised. In 2011, McFate stated that HTS had a $150 million annual budget.

=== Notable academic embeds ===
- Michael V. Bhatia (killed while serving with a HTT in Khost, Afghanistan in May 2008)
- AnnaMaria Cardinalli (a musician and theologian, who attracted attention for her report on sexual practices in Afghanistan)
- Robert Holbert
- Fouad Lghzaoui
- Paula Loyd (doused with fuel and set alight by an Afghan male in November 2008; died two months later in Brooke Army Medical Center)
- David Matsuda
- Nicole Suveges (killed on duty as HTT-member on 24 June 2008 when a bomb exploded at the District Council building in Sadr City)

== Public debate: praise, criticism and controversy ==
=== Praise and support ===
==== US government officials ====
In a speech in 2008, Robert Gates (US Defense Secretary) praised HTS, saying that although the program had experienced early "teething problems" the "net effect" of HTS efforts was often "less violence across the board, with fewer hardships and casualties among civilians as a result".

==== Military officials and HTS personnel ====
... the chance to change the nature of warfare, the chance to anthropologize the military – and not the other way around – the chance to lessen casualties, avoid conflict, take people through the post-conflict to peace ...

— HTS Social Scientist, David Matsuda, on the HTS program (2008)

In a 2007 article on HTS in the New York Times, David Rohde, an American journalist who has twice won the Pulitzer Prize, reported that one of the first HTTs to be deployed in Afghanistan had received "lavish" praise from officers for "helping them see the situation from an Afghan perspective and allowing them to cut back on combat operations". He wrote that HTS had also been praised by Afghan and Western civilian officials in the area, although they had been "cautious about predicting long term success". Rohde also cited Colonel David Woods (Commander of the 4th Squadron of the 73rd Cavalry Regiment) as having remarked: "Call it what you want, it works ... It works in helping you define the problems, not just the symptoms."

In a statement to the United States House of Representatives in 2008, Colonel Martin Schweitzer, Commander of the 4th Brigade Combat Team, 82nd Airborne Division, claimed that HTS capabilities had reduced his unit's "kinetic operations" in Afghanistan by 60–70 per cent within a year. His statement of praise for HTS was subsequently reported in the New York Times and Harper's Magazine as well as other press media. It was also cited by Robert Gates when he praised the program in 2010. Schweitzer's statistics, however, were later disputed by David Price.

The US media has reported a number of positive review from HTS employees. In 2008, World Politics Review ran a feature article on David Matsuda (a former professor of anthropology at California State University) who described HTS as "the chance to change the nature of warfare, the chance to anthropologize the military – and not the other way around – the chance to lessen casualties, avoid conflict, take people through the post-conflict to peace". Matsuda also described the disapproval of anthropologists as a "knee-jerk reaction" and stated "I came here to save lives, to make friends out of enemies". Michael Bhatia, an embedded anthropologist who was killed whilst serving in Afghanistan, contended that "some academics have created a polemical enemy image rather than actually learning what HTS does". Audrey Roberts, an HTS social scientist who worked with a US Army Brigade at Forward Operating Base Salerno near Khost in Afghanistan, expressed her support of the HTS approach in an interview from 2009.

==== In the media ====
In 2006, George Packer, author of The Assassin's Gate: America in Iraq and New Yorker magazine staff writer, wrote an article about the increasing use of social science in US military operations and the early trials of the HTS program. He reflected: "At a moment when the Bush Administration has run out of ideas and lost control, it could turn away from its "war on terror" and follow a different path – one that is right under its nose."

In a (mainly critical) book about HTS entitled David Petraeus's Favorite Mushroom: Inside the US Army's Human Terrain System (2009), John Stanton stated that HTS had been successful in advising a US military unit in Iraq on proper mealtime etiquette, i.e., not only how to properly eat, but also the gestures during the meal, and especially how to observe the Ramadan feast.

=== Criticism and controversy ===
==== American Anthropological Association ====
When ethnographic investigation is determined by military missions, not subject to external review, where data collection occurs in the context of war, integrated into the goals of counterinsurgency, and in a potentially coercive environment – all characteristic features of the HTS concept and its application – it can no longer be considered a legitimate professional exercise of anthropology.

— CEAUSSIC, Final Report on HTS (2009)

On 31 October 2007, the American Anthropological Association (AAA) published a statement opposing HTS as an "unacceptable application of anthropological expertise". The statement argued that HTS personnel would have responsibilities to the U.S. military working in war zones that would conflict with anthropologists' duty, as outlined in the AAA Code of Ethics (Section III, A, 1), to "do no harm to those they study". It further maintained that, working in a war zone, HTS personnel would be unable to ensure the "voluntary informed consent (without coercion)" of those whom they communicate with, as is also required by the AAA Code of Ethics (Section III, A, 4).

In December 2008, the AAA Executive Board followed up their initial statement of disapproval by asking the Commission on Engagement of Anthropology with the US Security and Intelligence Services (CEAUSSIC) to thoroughly review the HTS program. CEAUSSIC's "Final Report on the Army's Human Terrain Proof-of-Concept System" was released in December 2009.

CEAUSSIC's 74-page report argued that the "goals" and "basic identity" of HTS were characterized by "confusion", and that the program was designed to simultaneously perform multiple tasks that were "potentially irreconcilable"; e.g., serving as research function whilst also operating as "a source of intelligence" and a "tactical function in counterinsurgency warfare". It added that this confusion would make it unclear to anthropologists whether they could follow the Code of Ethics or not. The commission further maintained that HTS personnel would be unable to "maintain reliable control" over the information they collected, and that there was a "significant likelihood" that HTS data would be used "as part of military intelligence", which would place "researchers and their counterparts in the field in harm's way". It also noted that if HTS were a research organization, "it would be required to comply with federal law for subject protection" and suggested that it was "unusual" that the program had avoided oversight by an Institutional Review Board (IRB). In conclusion, the report stated: "When ethnographic investigation is determined by military missions, not subject to external review, where data collection occurs in the context of war, integrated into the goals of counterinsurgency, and in a potentially coercive environment – all characteristic features of the HTS concept and its application – it can no longer be considered a legitimate professional exercise of anthropology". It recommended that the AAA emphasize the incompatibility of HTS with anthropological disciplinary ethics and practice.

In April 2012, the AAA restated their disapproval of the HTS program after a cover story article in C4ISR (a Defense News publication) claimed that "the controversy ha[d] cooled" and that HTS would have a recruiter at the annual AAA meeting in November that year. The AAA denied both claims.

==== Anthropologists ====
In 2007, the Network of Concerned Anthropologists (NCA) was founded by a group of anthropologists, largely in response to the HTS program. In 2010, the Network wrote an "Anthropologists' Statement on the Human Terrain System Program" to the United States House of Representatives, which was signed by over 700 anthropologists. The statement called for Congress to halt governmental support to HTS and cancel plans for its expansion, giving the following reasons: "There is no evidence that HTS is effective"; "HTS is dangerous and reckless"; "HTS wastes taxpayers money"; "HTS is unethical for anthropologists and other social scientists".

In April 2008, a conference was held at the University of Chicago to address the growing controversy around the HTS program and situate it in a global, longue durée context of knowledge production and power relations. Participants in the lively and informative debate included many members of the NCA and other scholars, including several who were working for or with various branches of the U.S. military. Many of the papers presented at the conference were later published in a book edited by John D. Kelly, Beatrice Jauregui, Sean T. Mitchell, and Jeremy Walton, titled Anthropology and Global Counterinsurgency (University of Chicago Press, 2010).

Roberto J. Gonzalez (Associate Professor of Anthropology at San Jose State University), Hugh Gusterson (Professor of Anthropology and Sociology at George Mason University), and David Price (Professor of Anthropology and Sociology at Saint Martin's University) – three of the founding members of NCA – have all written numerous articles criticizing HTS as an effort to "weaponize anthropology". In a 2010 article, Gusterson wrote of the program: "The Pentagon seems to have decided that anthropology is to the war on terror what physics was to the cold war". He criticized HTS for performing "drive-by research" as well as violating disciplinary ethics, arguing that the AAA Code of Ethics is comparable to the Hippocratic oath: "Asking an anthropologist to gather intelligence that may lead to someone's death or imprisonment ... is like asking an army doctor to kill a wounded insurgent".

In a paper from 2009, Neil L. Whitehead, Professor of Anthropology at the University of Wisconsin–Madison, questioned whether HTS can work in the way that it is promoted to do. Drawing on anthropological studies of warfare that demonstrate the socially transformative effects of warfare and military action, Whitehead argued that the practice of anthropology becomes "highly problematic" in a situation where anthropology is being deployed to report on "the very phenomenon it is a part of changing, whether consciously or not". He therefore suggested that ethical objections to HTS are not limited to the anthropologist's potential violation of their duty of confidentiality and responsibility to their informants, but also include the questionable "ethical responsibility" of those anthropologists and military planners "erroneously" promoting HTS as being able to work in ways that "in all likelihood" cannot actually work, thereby "endangering anthropologists and soldiers alike".

Other anthropologists who have criticized HTS include Marshall Sahlins, who describes HTS as "manipulating local culture, imposing [our government's objectives] on them, transforming anthropologists into spies, and putting people you work with [in the locale] at risk"; and Maximilian Forte, who has published numerous articles on HTS in academic journals and on internet websites.

==== Military officials and former HTS personnel ====
In 2009, Major Ben Connable (Marine Corps) published an article in Military Review which argued that HTS was "undermining" the US Army's "cultural competence".

A number of former HTS personnel have also criticized the program. In 2007, social scientist Zenia Helbig was fired from HTS after raising concerns that the program was disorganized and provided insufficient region-specific training. In the same year, Matt Tompkins, an HTT Leader, remarked that defense contractors supporting HTS were not providing sufficient training or staffing, and that the social scientists on his team lacked region-specific expertise. In 2015, Ryan Evans, a HTT social scientist from November 2010 to August 2011, wrote that the program had failed to recruit the right people and provide adequate training. He also argued that the US Army had made major mistakes by calling HTS an anthropology program and denying it was an intelligence program.

==== NDU Study ====
In June 2013, a team of four researchers from the US National Defense University in Washington, DC published an in-depth assessment of HTS and the HTTs in Afghanistan, entitled Human Terrain Teams: An Organizational Innovation for Sociocultural Knowledge in Irregular Warfare. This was the first publicly released book with a history of the program as well as an assessment of the teams in the field. The study's conclusions were also published in Joint Force Quarterly in July 2013.

The study emerged from the Project for National Security Reform and its flagship assessment of the US national security system, Forging a New Shield. The study interviewed 87 individuals in a total of 105 interviews. The participants were principally team members, with commanders (primarily Brigade- and Task Force-level commanders) being the core variable able to define effectiveness of the team under their command. HTS program managers, knowledgeable defense-related persons, and some Iraq team members were interviewed. In researching the program's history, the study's authors found that the relationship between HTS and the Army's Training and Doctrine Command (TRADOC) was one of the primary reasons for the problems within the program. Decisions made about HTS by TRADOC, such as new personnel contracts, had a negative impact on the program. However, the lack of a theory of performance in the beginning by HTS, and the lack of continual assessments of the teams in the field by HTS, meant that the program managers lacked the knowledge to train and deploy effective HTTs.

The authors also point out that the study's assessments strongly agree with the conclusions of earlier studies conducted by faculty at West Point, the Center for Naval Analyses (CNA), and the Institute for Defense Analyses (IDA). All four studies concluded that the program suffered from multiple problems in its creation and implementation, which inhibited the effectiveness of the teams in the field. Yet, all agree that a high majority of commanders were extremely supportive of the teams and found them effective.

===== Assessment Comparisons – NDU Study =====
Study	Successful	Partial Success	No Impact
West Point Study	High Valued (4)		
CNA Study	Very Useful (5)	Varied Usefulness (8)	Not Useful (3)
IDA Study	Successful (26)	Partial Success (9)	No Impact (1)
NDU Study	Effective (8)	Mixed (4)	Not Effective (1)

The NDU study was different in that it categorized the commanders' assessments according to basic concepts of "Cultural Awareness" (Description), "Cultural Understanding" (Explanation), and "Cultural Intelligence" (Prediction). It was found that most commanders only found and used their HTTs at the first level, Awareness. Some of the better performing HTTs could offer Understanding. Only a few HTTs, the very high performing teams with highly effective individuals, held a strong sense of teamwork and were commanded by culturally aware units and commanders. If commanders did not care about cultural issues, which did occur in some cases, the team would have no impact regardless of the team's effectiveness in other circumstances.

Finally, the nature of the intelligence architecture in Afghanistan was seen as the issue that had the biggest impact on HTT performance. Because the intelligence architecture did not value sociocultural knowledge and was not built to provide it, HTTs themselves had to be the ground sensors, a role they had not been designed to fulfill. HTTs were intended to be the aggregators of knowledge at the Brigade level to synthesize information to commanders directly. If HTTs had been built to be the sensors, they would have had to be multiplied in size and number many times over. By utilizing the HTTs as the primary interviewers and data analysts, their effectiveness was constrained. Since HTT members had relatively short tours (9–12 months), and would usually have a new Brigade arrive in the middle of their tour, their effectiveness was further reduced by their constant need to train new units on area features. The NDU team concluded that had soldiers themselves been the primary sensors on the ground, as recommended in LTG Michael T. Flynn's Fixing Intel monograph, HTTs would have better been able to perform the role they were originally intended to serve.

The NDU book ends by suggesting that HTS be turned over to the U.S. Army Special Operations Command (USASOC). There were a number of reasons the team suggested USASOC would be a better fit for HTS: TRADOC had been a prime cause of multiple programmatic problems for HTS throughout its history; the US military has a history of intentionally forgetting and deinstitutionalizing cultural programs; and the future operating environment would be utilizing Special Operations forces to a greater degree than regular Army/Marines units.

==== In the media ====
Ann Marlowe wrote a piece about HTS for the Weekly Standard in November 2007, stating that "there are some things the Army needs in Afghanistan, but more academics are not at the top of the list."

=== Cultural references ===
In 2010, James Der Derian, David Udris, and Michael Udris released a documentary film about HTS entitled Human Terrain: War Becomes Academic. The film has been described as having two main narrative components: the first is an inquiry into the HTS program and its history; the second is a narrative of the "tragic" story of Michael Bhatia's involvement in HTS. The film features interviews with numerous individuals who have played an important role in the history of HTS and the public debate surrounding the program, including Michael Bhatia, Steve Fondacaro, Roberto Gonzalez, Hugh Gusterson, and Montgomery McFate.

== See also ==
- Cultural anthropology
- Project Camelot
- Synthetic psychological environment
