= Human Terrain: War Becomes Academic =

- Theatrical Release Poster for Human Terrain: War Becomes Academic (Bullfrog Films, 2010)
- Directed by: James Der Derian, David Udris, Michael Udris
- Starring: Michael Bhatia, Steve Fondacaro, Roberto Gonzalez, Hugh Gusterson, Christopher Hitchens, Richard Holbrooke, Montgomery McFate
- Distributed by: Bullfrog Films
- Release date: April 16, 2010 (USA)
- Running time: 82 min
- Country: USA
- Language: English

Human Terrain: War Becomes Academic is a 2010 documentary film about the US Army's Human Terrain System (HTS), written and directed by James Der Derian, David Udris and Michael Udris. The film examines the history of the HTS program, the public controversy surrounding HTS, and the story of the involvement of one academic (Michael V. Bhatia) in the program.

== Synopsis ==
Human Terrain has two narrative components. One is an inquiry into the HTS program, which is based around footage of the directors' visits to the HTS training base at Fort Leavenworth and of interviews with HTS personnel, US Government officials, and academic commentators on the HTS program. The other is an account of Michael Bhatia's involvement in HTS, which centers around an exploration of his reasons for joining the program.

Human Terrain features interviews with key HTS personnel – including HTS's former Senior Social Scientist, Montgomery McFate and the former director of HTS, Steve Fondacaro – and with some of the most well-known critics of the HTS program, including Roberto J. Gonzalez and Hugh Gusterson.

== Production ==
Human Terrain started out as a research project for the "Cultural Awareness and the Military Project" at the Watson Institute for International Studies. In 2005, Der Derian visited the March Air Reserve Base in Riverside, California, where he observed US Marine staff taking part in "cultural sensitivity" exercises. Shortly afterwards, he began working on a documentary film about the increasing prioritization of "cultural knowledge" in US military operations in Iraq and Afghanistan with David and Michael Udris. Der Derian and the Udris brothers began filming in 2006, when they embedded themselves in the 1st Battalion 25th Marines at the Marine Corps Air Ground Combat Center Twentynine Palms in order to film and observe the "Mojave Viper" training program, which takes place at a simulation Iraqi village in the Mojave Desert. After learning of the death of Michael Bhatia – who had previously worked with Der Derian at Brown University – on May 7, 2008, the directors decided to make HTS and Bhatia the main focus of their film. They visited Bhatia's mother, who gave them permission to use Bhatia's field notes, journals, photographs and audio files that he had recorded in the field. In the autumn of 2009, The film-makers subsequently visited the Training Base for HTS at Fort Leavenworth where they interviewed key members of the HTS program.

== Release ==
Human Terrain was first released at the Festival dei Pololi in Florence, Italy on November 6, 2009, where it won the festival's Audience Award. It was subsequently released in the USA on 16 April 2010 at the Wisconsin Film Festival. In addition to Italy and the USA, the film has been screened in Belgium, Denmark, Germany, Slovenia and the UK. Human Terrain also featured in the following film festivals: the Copenhagen International Film Festival (November 2009), the Cambridge Film Festival (September 2010), the Mezinárodni Documentary Film Festival (October 2010), and the Millennium International Documentary Film Festival (June 2011).

== Critical reception ==
The critical reception of Human Terrain has been mostly positive. Tony Jones, the artistic director of Cambridge Film Festival, remarked: "Human Terrain is one of the most extraordinary films I have seen for a long time ... It is a very moving and involving film". Writing in the Journal of American Studies, Luke Middup described Human Terrain as "an important work that sheds light on a metamorphosis taking place in the nature of warfare that is too often overlooked in mainstream reporting of wards in Iraq and Afghanistan" Keith W. Ray described the film as "refreshing and illuminating" in a review in Current Anthropology. On the other hand, Maximillian C. Forte has criticized the conception of the film, and particularly its focus on Bhatia rather than "any one of the thousands of Afghan civilians who were killed by Bhatia's employers, the U.S. military".

Human Terrain has also been noted for its contribution to the public debate surrounding the HTS program.

== Accolades ==
- 2009. Festival dei Popoli Audience Award
