= PrognoCIS =

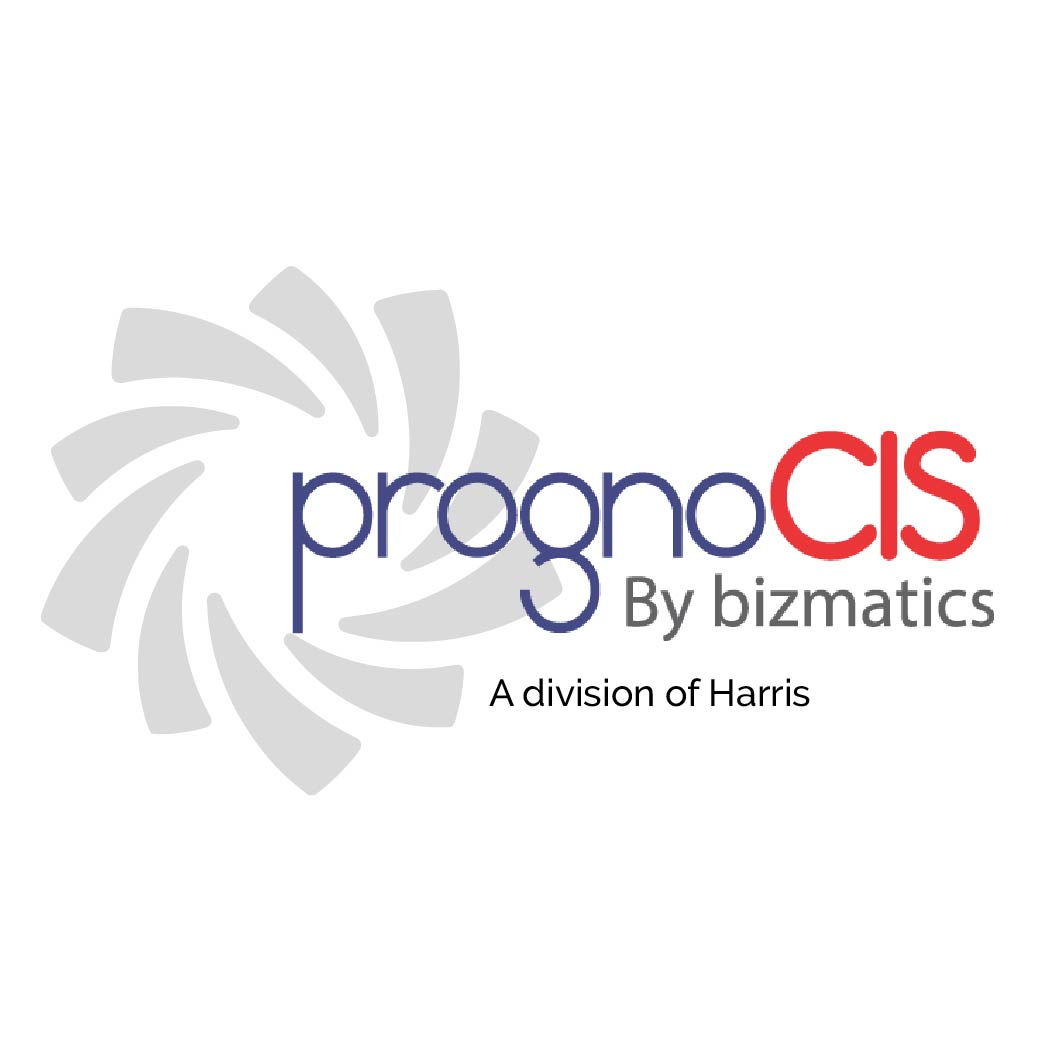
PrognoCIS Logo

PrognoCIS by Bizmatics is a cloud-based electronic health record software (EHR) company. Bizmatics was founded in 2002 out of Silicon Valley, California and is now headquartered in Niagara Falls, New York. In 2021, Bizmatics was acquired by Harris, an operating group within Constellation Software Inc.

The current EVP of Bizmatics is Derek Smith and the current Group President of Harris is Jerry Canada.

== Services ==
PrognoCIS' services include:

- EHR software
- Practice management services
- Revenue cycle management service

== Partnerships ==
In 2022, Bizmatics partnered with Akeso Occupational Health to offer occupational medicine services to its employees.

In 2024, Bizmatics partnered with DrFirst to integrate patient engagement tools into PrognoCIS, enabling automated messaging and educational support for patients following electronic prescriptions, with the aim of improving medication adherence.

PrognoCIS integrates drug knowledge data from First Databank (FDB) to support medication decision-making and patient safety within clinical workflows.

PrognoCIS introduced an AI-powered suite of tools, including a chat assistant, automated clinical summaries, and a virtual scribe, designed to streamline clinical workflows and reduce documentation time for healthcare providers.

In 2026, Bizmatics expanded its AI-powered PrognoAI suite with features such as a virtual scribe, chat assistant, and automated health summaries. According to the company, the tools can reduce clinical documentation time by up to 40%, helping streamline workflows and improve provider efficiency.

In May 2026, PrognoCIS announced a strategic collaboration with Global Payments to launch PrognoPay, an integrated healthcare payment solution.

In November 2026, Bizmatics announced that Beacon Health System's Occupational Health Division had selected PrognoCIS to modernize its occupational medicine operations.
