= Minerva Initiative =

US Department of Defense research program

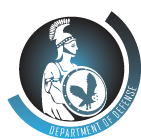
Minerva Initiative logo

The Minerva Initiative is a research program sponsored by the U.S. Department of Defense (DoD) that provides grants to sustain university-based, social science studies on areas of strategic importance to U.S. national security policy. The program looks to tap into the community of area specialists and other university researchers, particularly those who work on Islam, Iraq, China, and related areas. Since its establishment in 2008, the Department of Defense has awarded over 70 grants to private researchers. Grants are awarded on an annual basis for research projects that typically last three years.

In 2011 the DoD hosted the first annual Minerva Conference. The event has since become an annual gathering in September for Minerva researchers, DoD keynote speakers, and scholars to highlight the most relevant research conducted through the program's support. In 2025, the Trump administration defunded this program and DOD Minerva no longer exists.

== History ==
In 2008, the project was provided $50 million by the United States Department of Defense to fund research on five separate themes. When the program began in 2008 project funding was split between DoD and the National Science Foundation. Since that time, all projects have been funded solely by the DoD. The goal was to create improved relations between the Department of Defense and the universities and to develop knowledge that the military can benefit from in the long term.

Secretary of Defense Robert M. Gates commissioned the Minerva Initiative under the vision of "... a consortia [sic] of universities that will promote research in specific areas." Originally, Secretary Gates proposed four principal focus areas: 1) Chinese Military and Technology Studies 2) Iraqi and Terrorist Perspective Projects 3) Religious and Ideological Studies, and 4) New Disciplines Project and 5) Open Category. Since its establishment, the Minerva Initiative has expanded the breadth of sponsored research to include a wide range of academic disciplines and topics [see Ongoing Research]. The program continues to fund research on the most important social science topics for universities like Arizona State University, which recently received a grant to support research on terrorists' use of social media.

As of March 2025, the state and future of the program is uncertain following grant terminations and email communications stating that the Department of Defense is “no longer offering the Minerva University Research Competition." These changes are linked to wider governmental efforts to reduce funding to units that include the Department of Defense.

== Purpose ==
The stated goal of the Minerva Initiative "is to improve DoD's basic understanding of the social, cultural, behavioral, and political forces that shape regions of the world of strategic importance to the U.S." The program seeks to achieve this by sponsoring research designed to bring together universities, research institutions, and individual scholars. Three key priorities reflect the objectives of the Secretary of Defense for the Minerva Initiative:

1) Leverage and focus the resources of the Nation's top universities.

2) Seek to define and develop foundational knowledge about sources of present and future conflict with an eye toward better understanding of the political trajectories of key regions of the world.

3) Improve the ability of DoD to develop cutting-edge social science research, foreign area and interdisciplinary studies that is developed and vetted by the best scholars in these fields."

== Ongoing research ==
As of 2015 the Minerva Initiative's priority research areas fell within four categories:

I. Identity, Influence, and Mobilization

II. Contributors to Societal Resilience and Change

III. Power and Deterrence

IV. Innovations in National Security, Conflict, and Cooperation

A list of all research awards made since the start of the Minerva Initiative are listed at the program's site: https://web.archive.org/web/20091212104216/http://minerva.dtic.mil/funded.html. In 2015, the Minerva Steering Committee received over 300 applications (297 white papers and 46 full proposals).

== Controversy ==
The program's funding of social science research for national security purposes has proven controversial. Although many scholars support Minerva, at the program's start a number of academic researchers sounded public alarm about the prospect of Defense Department funding for research. In 2008 the American Anthropological Association sent a public letter suggesting that the funding be transferred to a different body, such as the National Science Foundation (NSF). Hugh Gusterson, a prominent anthropologist at George Mason University, wrote a series of articles in a variety of venues that have attracted significant attention,

any attempt to centralize thinking about culture and terrorism under the Pentagon's roof will inevitably produce an intellectually shrunken outcome. ... The Pentagon will have the false comfort of believing that it has harnessed the best and the brightest minds, when in fact it will have only received a very limited slice of what the ivory tower has to offer—academics who have no problem taking Pentagon funds. Social scientists call this "selection bias," and it can lead to dangerous analytical errors.

The journalist Nafeez Ahmed has expressed concern that Minerva research, in its effort to understand mass mobilization, may be targeting peaceful activists, NGOs and protest movements. Others believe social science should continue to emphasize security issues but worry that DoD funding will bias findings. One article notes:

In an incentive structure that rewards an emphasis on countering global threats and securing the homeland, the devil lies in the definitions. In this framework, the Boston Marathon bombing becomes a national security problem, whereas the Sandy Hook massacre remains a matter for the police and psychologists—a distinction that is both absurd as social science and troubling as public policy.

== See also ==
- Human Terrain System
- Project Camelot
