= Colors Insulting to Nature =

Book by Cintra Wilson

- Author: Cintra Wilson
- Language: English
- Genre: Fiction
- Publisher: Harper Perennial
- Publication date: 2004
- Publication place: United States
- Media type: Print
- Pages: 368
- ISBN: 0-00-715460-7
- OCLC: 52459920
- Dewey Decimal: 813/.6 21
- LC Class: PS3573.I45685 C65 2004

Colors Insulting To Nature is the fictional follow-up novel to Cintra Wilson's previous collection of non-fiction essays in A Massive Swelling. Within the novel, Wilson takes the central theme of her essays, which is America's obsession with celebrity culture, and makes it the starting point for her narration, focusing on the Normal family, and in particular the aspirations of 13-year-old Liza Normal.

== Plot ==
Set in the early 1980s, Liza Normal goes on numerous theater and commercial auditions, at the behest of her mother Peppy, who costumes the child in a strapless evening gowns, heavy make-up, and false eyelashes. Humiliations repeat for Liza, as she and her family encounter endless degradation, after opening a dinner theater in Marin County, California. Throughout the first half of the novel, Liza is forced to perform in a dilapidated firehouse, which functions as the theater, as well as the family's home, attend school where she is constantly ridiculed and tormented, and at one point, raped. After this, Liza undergoes several phases, the first of which is a gravitation toward the punk rock aesthetic, specifically embracing and cultivating the look of Plasmatics performer, Wendy O. Williams. Liza eventually becomes involved with a drug pusher, and at one point becomes addicted herself during her stint at "Elf House," which Wilson describes as a commune of hippies who have a fetish with elves and speaking in "Quenya, the J.R.R. Tolkien version of High Elf language." It is during this time, that Liza, while working for Centaur Productions—a company that creates and distributes Slash fiction, that she concocts an "alter ego, Venal de Minus, into a phone sex phenomenon and Las Vegas stage act," achieving a new definition of success that is a spin-off of the earlier theater ambitions initially sought by her mother.

== Reception ==
- New York Times book review stated, "Wilson is the thinking woman's David Foster Wallace.... Colors Insulting to Nature is hilarious and strong."
- Prudence Peiffer, of Library Journal, reviewed the book saying, "Ironically, it is when she reverts to her essayist self, inserting her own voice and lengthy exegeses on pop cultural landmarks, that the pace lags. In those ponderous moments we almost lose sight of our quirky heroine, who (refreshingly) is anything but. Recommended for most collections."
- New York Post - "What really astonishes is the energy and brilliance of Wilson's writing... Colors Insulting to Nature is a fluid, seemingly effortless torrent of highly amusing prose that never succumbs to the self-regard it easily deserves"
- A Kirkus Reviews review says, "Wilson's ambition to be a memorable satirist of pop culture is thwarted by her high-decibel prose: she needs to bring the volume down, way down."
- A Publishers Weekly review says, "Wilson's public persona is as flamboyant as her writing, and the novel should garner plenty of media attention, though it may be a more challenging sell than A Massive Swelling."
- Daily Texan reviewed it as a "terrifically dysfunctional coming of age odyssey... Colors Insulting to Nature tells the true girl-growing-up with wit and without apologies."

== See also ==
Montgomery McFate
