= Analyst's Notebook =

Data analysis software

- Developer(s): i2 Group, a subsidiary of Constellation Software
- Operating system: Windows
- Type: Productivity software, mind map, project management and knowledge management
- License: Commercial license
- Website: i2group.com

i2 Analyst's Notebook is a software product from i2 Group for data analysis. Based on ELP (entity-link-property) methodology, it reveals relationships between data entities to discover patterns and provide insight into data. It is commonly used by digital analysts at law enforcement, military and other government intelligence agencies, and by fraud departments. It is a part of the Human Terrain System, a United States Army program which embeds social scientists with combat brigades. Several investigations, including an investigation into fraud in the U.S. Army, are reported to have used it. It is also used by Swedish police to analyse social contacts and social networks.

IBM acquired i2 Analyst's Notebook when it bought the i2 Group in 2011.

IBM sold all the i2 products, including i2 Analyst's Notebook, to Harris Computer Systems, a part of Constellation Software, in January 2022.

== See also ==
- List of concept- and mind-mapping software
