= I2 Group =

Software companies of the United Kingdom

i2 Group
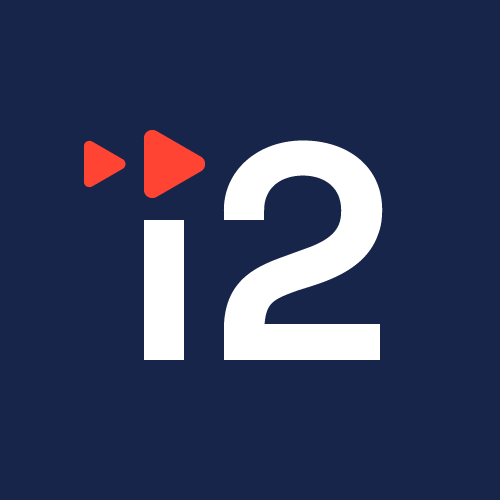
- Industry: Analytics software
- Founded: 1990; 36 years ago Cambridge, Cambridgeshire, England, U.K.
- Products: i2 Analyst's Notebook; i2 iBase; Analysis Hub; Analysis Studio
- Parent: ChoicePoint (2005); Silver Lake Partners (2008); IBM (2011); Harris Computer (2022)

i2 Group is a UK-based software company that produces visual link analysis software for military intelligence, law enforcement, and commercial agencies. Since 2022, it has been a wholly owned subsidiary of Constellation Software.

== History ==
Founded in 1990 in Cambridge, i2 Limited sold products to more than 2,000 organizations in 149 countries, including most members of NATO. The company was founded by Mike Hunter and Dr Tim Spiers, who along with the employees of the company, held all shares until the company was acquired in 2005.

i2 developed software products for visualization and analysis of disparate data sources to aid criminal investigation, and which were later also used by other branches of government (including anti-terrorism, military intelligence and defense), as well as commercial fraud.

Beginning with desktop Windows solution, the first products were the i2 Link Notebook and i2 Case Notebook, which would eventually be used by every police force throughout the UK, and were often the incentive for the first PC installed for use by analysts and investigators in a particular office.

Product capability and range was expanded from law enforcement, for use across industries including government, military and national defense and public safety, as well as commercial fraud prevention.

US headquarters (known as i2 Incorporated) was in McLean, Virginia. In 2005 the company was acquired by ChoicePoint.

In June 2008, i2 was acquired from ChoicePoint by Silver Lake Partners Sumeru fund for $185 million.

In July 2009, i2 merged with Knowledge Computing Corporation (KCC), makers of Coplink software. KCC was founded in 1998 in Tucson, Arizona.

In 2011, i2 received $10 million as an out of court settlement from Palantir. i2 sued Palantir in federal court alleging fraud, conspiracy, and copyright infringement over Palantir's algorithm. Shyam Sankar, Palantir’s director of business development, used a private eye company as the cutout for obtaining i2's code.

In December 2021, IBM announced that it will be divesting the i2 family of products to N. Harris Computer Corporation, a division of Constellation Software. The acquisition was completed in January 2022, and the business subsequently began operating as i2 Group within Harris Computer Corporation.

== Products ==
The first products included the i2 Link Notebook and i2 Case Notebook.

The i2 Link Notebook enabled investigators to create entity relationship diagrams (a kind of visual database) allowing raw intelligence – largely textual reports (e.g. witness statements) – to be entered manually, revealing the relationships within the data and enabling data from different sources to be collated and graded. Automatic and manual layouts, and the ability to create, share, search, analyze and crucially print, even extremely large charts (sometimes tens of meters in length), dramatically improved law enforcement's ability to understand and communicate the status of investigations, and to direct and manage the process.

The i2 Case Notebook provided similar data entry and visualization of time series data (i.e. laying events out along themes such as people and places), again able to handle very large data sets. Even with variable density timescales, due to the very large number of events uncovered in a large investigation, a single Case Chart could cover several walls in an office, or stretch tens of meters along a corridor.

While initially for manual data entry, these tools were then extended with add-on components to allow integration with databases. These database add-ons allowed mapping between a database entities (such as person, place, organization, vehicle, asset, event) and the relationships between entities (such as associate, owns, related) and visual entities used to represent those records on the chart (person icon, place icon etc.). The first such database interface was to HOLMES 2 (Home Office Large Major Enquiry System), and subsequently many different SQL and even free text data sources. With database integration a query could be entered from within the visual representation of the data, the chart, either using a context menu on the chart background, or on a displayed entity (usually an icon). Query results were delivered directly to the visualization, by adding elements to the chart, and any added entities and links were automatically laid out without disturbing the rest of the chart, for ease of understanding. Investigators could explore a database with an initial search, and then incrementally expand to follow particular lines of thought. For example, by right clicking a person icon, choosing "Expand", and having new entities displayed as icons connected to the queried person, to show relationships drawn directly from the database. Thus revealing associations that would be difficult to spot through a traditional database query UI such as a person record that may or may not include information about known associates, vehicles, assets and so on, related to that person. This removed the need for any contextual knowledge by the investigator to infer likely relationships, and enabled even a new investigator to quickly explore new data or new hypotheses even with very large data sets.

The i2 Analyst's Notebook became the name for a packaged solution which included the i2 Link Notebook and i2 Case Notebook. This was part of the Human Terrain System, a United States Army program which embeds social scientists with combat brigades. An investigation into fraud in the U.S. Army was reported to have used Analyst's Notebook in 2009. Analyst's Notebook was also used in the Army Distributed Common Ground System through 2011.

Other i2 products included: Analyst's Workstation, iBase, iBase Intellishare, iXv Visualizer, iBridge, iXa Search Service, TextChart, ChartReader and PatternTracer. Its products deal with problems sometimes called "big data".

In September 2011, it was announced that IBM acquired i2 Limited. The terms were not disclosed, but estimated at around $500 million. At the time, it was estimated to have 350 employees. The products were then sold under the IBM i2 brand, as part of its "Smarter Cities" campaign.
