= Michael Bhatia =

Researcher studying conflict

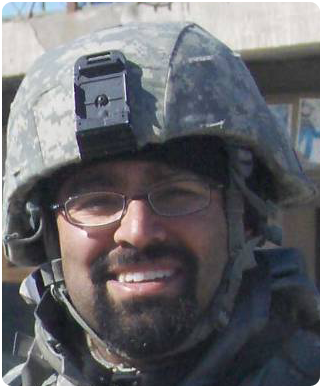
- Michael Bhatia in Afghanistan, Social Science Advisor for the Human Terrain Team
- Born: August 23, 1976; Upland, California, USA
- Died: May 7, 2008 (aged 31); Khost Province, Afghanistan

Academic work
- Notable works: War and Intervention: Issues for Contemporary Peace Operations (2003); Afghanistan, Arms and Conflict: Armed Groups, Disarmament and Security in a Post-War Society (co-author, 2008)

Michael Vinay Bhatia (August 23, 1976 – May 7, 2008) was a researcher studying conflict resolution in war-torn countries. He was born in Upland, California. He attended Brown University, where he graduated magna cum laude with a B.A. in International Relations in 1999. He was the recipient of the Herbert Scoville Jr. Peace Fellowship and a Marshall Scholarship to study at the University of Oxford where he earned his M.Sc. in International Relations in 2002. He was a visiting fellow at the Watson Institute for International Studies at Brown University and a lecturer at Carleton University, Ottawa, Canada.

Bhatia was killed on May 7, 2008, in Khost Province, Afghanistan, where he was serving as a social scientist in consultation with the US Defense Department. On May 16, 2008, by order of Robert Gates, the Secretary of Defense of the United States, Bhatia was awarded the Secretary of Defense Medal for the Defense of Freedom posthumously.

== Research and work ==
Bhatia's work concentrated on conflict resolution in war-torn countries. His research and humanitarian work brought him to the Sahrawi refugee camps in western Algeria, East Timor, Kosovo, and Afghanistan.

Besides published works (see below) which Bhatia wrote and edited, he was working on a doctoral dissertation, "The Mujahideen: A Study of Combatant Motives in Afghanistan, 1978–2004" when he died.

Bhatia's field work had taken him to Khost Province, where he was working on resolutions to inter-tribal conflicts concerning land rights as part of the pilot Human Terrain System (HTS) program with the U.S. Army's 82d Airborne Division.

It has been estimated by US military personnel that Bhatia's Human Terrain Team helped one brigade reduce its killings by 60 to 70%, increase the number of districts supporting the Afghan government from 15 to 83, and reduce Afghan civilian deaths from over 70 during the previous brigade's tour to 11.

Bhatia's human terrain studies, work, and his death are the subject of part three in the documentary Human Terrain: War Becomes Academic, directed by James Der Derian.

== Death ==
Bhatia was assigned to the Afghanistan Human Terrain Team #1, in support of Task Force Currahee based at Forward Operating Base Salerno, Khost Province. His team was making an initial mission into a remote area of Khost province where they intended to initiate a negotiation process between tribes. He was killed when the Humvee he was riding in was struck by an improvised explosive device (IED). Two soldiers from Task Force Currahee were also killed in the attack, and two others were critically injured.

=== Commentary ===
The Army didn't go looking for him to ask for his service – he came looking for us because he was committed to make things better. Our nation is better, as are the people of Afghanistan, because of his devotion and brilliance. He will not be forgotten.

— General William S. Wallace, Commanding General, U.S. Army Training and Doctrine Command.

== List of works ==
- War and Intervention: Issues for Contemporary Peace Operation, Bloomfield, Connecticut: Kumarian Press, 2003, pp. 222, ISBN 978-1-56549-165-6, LCCN 2002156660, OCLC 51323537 LCC JZ6368.B48 2003
- Bhatia, Michael V.; Lanigan, Kevin; Wilkinson, Philip (2004). Minimal investments, minimal results : the failure of security policy in Afghanistan. Kabul: Afghanistan Research and Evaluation Unit. p. 22. LCCN 2006312419. LCC MLCM 2008/43874 (D) FT MEADE
- Michael, Bhatia; Sedra, Mark (editor); Gow, James; Kerr, Rachel (editor) (2008), Afghanistan, Arms and Conflict: Armed groups, disarmament and security in a post-war society, London, New York: Routledge, p. 324, ISBN 978-0-203-92843-1, LCCN 2007042299 LCC HN670.6.Z9 V525 2008
- Terrorism and the Politics of Naming (Third Worlds), (2007, Routledge; ISBN 978-0-415-41372-5, 232 pages)
- "Shooting Afghanistan: Beyond the Conflict" (2008, photo-essay)
- "The peace allergy: why the U.S. military had no plans for post-war Iraq", Bulletin of the Atomic Scientists, July 1, 2003, Foundation for Nuclear Science, Inc., Vol. 59, Issue 4, page 52 (8)
- "Sins of omission: the AJC's project interchange and the creation of American opinion. (American Jewish Committee)", Middle East Policy, September 1, 2002, Middle East Policy Council, Vol. 9, Issue 3, page 98 (7)
- "Postconflict profit: the political economy of intervention", Global Governance, April 1, 2005, Lynne Rienner Publishers, Vol. 11, Issue 2, page 205 (20)
