= TouchBistro =

Canadian technology company

TouchBistro Inc.
- Founded: 2010
- Founder: Alex Barrotti (CEO), Geordie Konrad (COO)
- Headquarters: Toronto, Canada
- Key people: Samir Zabaneh (CEO)
- Products: Restaurant iPad POS
- Number of employees: 450
- Website: www.touchbistro.com

TouchBistro Inc. is a Toronto-based software company that develops a restaurant point of sale system for the iPad. TouchBistro Inc. was founded by Alex Barrotti in 2010.

== History ==
Barrotti had previously founded INEX, a web-based online storefront creator, which he sold to Infospace (now Blucora) in 1999 for $45 million.

TouchBistro is an app that supports tableside ordering, custom restaurant layouts, custom menus, bill splitting, sales reports, and an unlimited number of order and cash register printers. It is available from the iTunes store. At some point it was the top grossing Food and Beverage iTunes app in over 34 countries. TouchBistro does not require an Internet connection, communicating with printers/cash drawers via local WIFI.

== PayPal Partnership ==
In August, 2013, TouchBistro partnered with PayPal to facilitate restaurant payments via smartphones.

In July, 2026, TouchBistro was acquired by Harris Computer, a Constellation Software company.

== See also ==
- Point of sale companies category
