= Pat Roberts Intelligence Scholars Program =

The Pat Roberts Intelligence Scholars Program (PRISP) is a program which funds selected US students entering university, in return for a commitment to join an intelligence agency for at least 18 months on graduation. The program was established by the US Congress in 2004. In 2010 it became a permanent, authorized funded IC program. By 2011 most IC agencies participate in this program which is designated to recruit and train analysts and linguists. PRISP funding can be used to pay hiring incentives, such as a recruitment bonus or reimburse previous educational expenses for individuals who already possess the necessary skills (language, specialized scientific or geographical area expertise), or to provide additional education or training for those selected for the program. There is a service obligation of 18 months. IC agencies' websites should be consulted for specifics on any particular agency's PRISP program participation.

It was the brainchild of University of Kansas anthropologist Felix Moos, who was advocating it as early as 1995. In June 2009 it was reported that Barack Obama's administration was planning to make PRISP a permanent program.

Students are required not to reveal their funding, and must attend "summer military intelligence camps." There have been fears raised by academics in the US and UK that the program might put anthropology students at risk when they do overseas fieldwork in dangerous locations, by creating the possibility that students on fieldwork are linked with US intelligence agencies. The secrecy is "a reminder for some of the bad old days of the 1960s, when the FBI and CIA kept tabs on the political views of U.S. professors."

PRISP is named after Senator Pat Roberts (the then Chairman of the Senate Select Committee on Intelligence). In April 2009, Citizens Against Government Waste gave PRISP a "Narcissist Award".

== See also ==
- National Security Education Program
- Human Terrain System
