= Montgomery McFate =

American anthropologist

- Born: Mitzy Carlough; January 8, 1966 (age 60); Sausalito, California
- Education: Harvard Law School (JD, 1997); Yale University (PhD, Anthropology, 1994); University of California, Berkeley (BA, Anthropology)
- Known for: Study of counterinsurgency and insurgent populations, anthropology of warfare
- Scientific career
- Fields: Anthropology
- Workplaces: United States Navy Naval War College, Minerva Chair, 2011– United States Army Human Terrain System, Senior Social Scientist, 2007–2010; United States Institute of Peace 2006–2007; Office of Naval Research; RAND Corporation

Montgomery McFate (also known as Montgomery Sapone and nicknamed Mitzy; born January 8, 1966) is a cultural anthropologist, a defense and national security analyst, and former Science Advisor to the United States Army Human Terrain System program. As of 2011, she holds the Minerva Chair (Strategic Research) at the U.S. Naval War College.

== Early life ==
McFate was raised in the houseboat community in Sausalito, California, at the time a "hippie" community. Her parents were artists and associates with such figures as Jack Kerouac and Lawrence Ferlinghetti. She grew up in poverty, living on a converted barge with no plumbing. In high school, McFate spent much of her time in the burgeoning early-1980s San Francisco punk scene, but at the same time, was a strong student with an academic focus, earning numerous scholarship that helped put her through college. During this time, McFate was a close friend of Cintra Wilson, and the character Lorna in her novel Colors Insulting to Nature is largely based on the young McFate.

== Academic career ==
She went on to study anthropology at UC Berkeley and as a graduate student at Yale University. McFate developed an interest in the conflict studies and the culture of insurgent groups, and did her doctoral dissertation on Irish Republican social networks and cultural narratives and the role that these played in maintaining the Irish Republican Army insurgency. As part of this research process, she spent several years living among IRA supporters and later among British counterinsurgents. After earning her PhD in anthropology in 1994, McFate went on to study law at Harvard Law School, earning a Juris Doctor in 1997.

While in graduate school, she married a US Army officer, Sean Sapone (the two would later adopt the maiden surname of his mother, Mary McFate). After earning her JD, she spent the next several years, variously, as an associate in a San Francisco law firm, working for human rights organizations, and as a travel writer. It is also alleged that during this time Montgomery and Sean McFate worked as private spies for Mary McFate's security firm.

== Defense career ==
It was after the September 11 attacks that McFate found what she describes as her "mission": to get the military to understand the importance of "cultural knowledge". McFate has stated that she became "passionate about one issue: the government’s need to actually understand its adversaries". In McFate's opinion, during the Cold War, the United States defense establishment developed a very good understanding of the Soviet Union, with the ultimate result of that the US triumphed in that conflict. On the other hand, she holds that the military and defense establishment has a very poor understanding of the cultures of the Middle East, resulting in such debacles as the Abu Ghraib torture and prisoner abuse scandal.

Over the next several years, McFate worked as a defense consultant for the Rand Corporation, the Office of Naval Research, and the United States Institute of Peace. In 2004, she was contacted by Dr. Hariar Cabayan, the Science Advisor to the Joint Chiefs of Staff J3 about developing new counterinsurgency strategies in the Iraq War. Ultimately, this led to the development of the Cultural Preparation of the Environment CPE database developed by MITRE Corporation. The CPE tool was never fielded and the CPE program ended in August 2005. While she is reported in some circles to have been one of the primary architects of the HTS program, she was not. The Human Terrain System program was established between August 2005 and July 2006 by the US Army's Foreign Military Studies Office directed at the time by Dr. Jacob Kipp. Some time in 2007, McFate joined HTS as the Social Science Advisor. Additionally, she was one of hundreds of contributing authors of the US Army's revised Counterinsurgency Field Manual FM 3-24. While many take credit for authorship, the primary author of the FM was LTC Jan Horvath.

McFate is alleged in several magazine articles to have been the blogger "Pentagon Diva", who briefly ran a blog called "I Luv a Man in Uniform" where she commented on the "hotness" of various Department of Defense officials and analysts.

== Publications ==
=== Books ===
- Montgomery McFate and Janice H. Laurence, Social Science Goes to War: The Human Terrain System in Iraq and Afghanistan. Oxford University Press, 2015. doi:10.1093/acprof:oso/9780190216726.001.0001 ISBN 9780190216726
- Montgomery McFate, Military Anthropology: Soldiers, Scholars and Subjects at the Margins of Empire. Oxford University Press, 2018. doi:10.1093/oso/9780190680176.001.0001 ISBN 9780190680176

=== Articles ===
- (as Montgomery Sapone) Ceasefire: The impact of Republican culture on the ceasefire process in Northern Ireland, Journal of Conflict Studies, 21(1), 2001. (PDF)
- Anthropology and counterinsurgency: The strange story of their curious relationship, Military Review, March–April 2005, p 24–38.
- Iraq: the social context of IEDs, Military Review, May–June 2005, p 37–40..
- (with Andrea Jackson) "An Organizational Solution for DoD's Cultural Knowledge needs", Military Review, July–August 2005, pp. 18–21. ISSN 0026-4148; OCLC 211483286, 99170298; British Library Document Supply Service (subscription required).
- The military utility of understanding adversary culture, Joint Forces Quarterly, Summer 2005, p 42–48.
- (with Andrea Jackson) The object beyond war: counterinsurgency and the four tools of political competition, Military Review, January–February 2006, p 13–26.

== Controversy ==
=== Anthropology and the military ===
The relationship between anthropologists and the military has long been the subject of controversy. Nevertheless, by the late 1960s, most Western anthropologists had come to reject such collaboration as a breach of trust between anthropologist participant observers and the people they study, endangering the welfare of both parties. The American Anthropological Association eventually adopted a policy against such collaboration.

McFate sought to reverse this trend, holding that it was possible for a mutually beneficial relationship to emerge between the US military and the populations that insurgency sprang from. This approach, however, has largely been negatively received by the anthropological community, and the American Anthropological Association issued resolutions in 2007 and 2008 condemning the kind of military/anthropological collaboration McFate had called for.

The Human Terrain System was condemned by the American Anthropological Association in November 2007, which called it an "unacceptable application of anthropological expertise." The program also came under fire for allegedly poor organization and execution and limited effectiveness.

A 2010 audit by the Army's Auditing Agency (AAA) identified weaknesses in the program's execution. The final AAA investigation, completed in the summer of 2014, did not uncover any significant weaknesses in the program's execution, and found that the program offered significant value to military units.
