= David Price (anthropologist) =

20th and 21st-century American anthropologist

- Born: David Harold Price; 1960 (age 65–66)

Academic background
- Education: The Evergreen State College; University of Chicago; University of Florida

Academic work
- Main interests: Anthropology
- Website: www.davidhprice.com

David Harold Price (born 1960) is an American anthropologist. He studied anthropology at Evergreen State College, the University of Chicago and the University of Florida (PhD 1993) and is a professor of anthropology at St. Martin's University in Lacey, Washington.

Price has conducted cultural anthropological and archaeological field work in Egypt and elsewhere in the Near East. His primary research area is the history of anthropology along with various interactions between anthropologists and military/intelligence agencies. His 2004 book Threatening Anthropology used tens of thousands of Federal Bureau of Investigation files released under the Freedom of Information Act to examine how the FBI harassed anthropologists that were activists in issues of racial equality during the McCarthy era. His 2008 book Anthropological Intelligence documented American anthropologists’ contributions to the Second World War. He has written journalistic exposés on military uses of anthropology in the Human Terrain System program, and on post-9/11 programs bringing the CIA and other intelligence agencies back on to American university campuses. Much of Price's historical and contemporary writing focuses on the ethical and political context of anthropological practice.

Price is a frequent contributor to CounterPunch, and is a member of the Network of Concerned Anthropologists. In 2022, David Price was identified as one of "today's top ten anthropologists" by the Academic Influencer ranking service.

== Books ==
- Cold War Deceptions: The Asia Foundation and the CIA. University of Washington Press, 2024.
- The American Surveillance State: How The U.S. Spies On Dissent. Pluto Books, 2022.
- Cold War Anthropology: The CIA, the Pentagon and the Growth of Dual Use Anthropology. Duke University Press, 2016.
- Weaponizing Anthropology: Social Science in Service of the Militarized State. AK/CounterPunch Books, 2011.
- Anthropological Intelligence: The Deployment and Neglect of American Anthropology in the Second World War. Duke University Press, 2008.
- Threatening Anthropology: McCarthyism and the FBI's Surveillance of Activist Anthropologists. Duke University Press, 2004.
- Atlas of World Cultures: A Geographical Guide to Ethnographic Literature. SAGE Publications, 1989.
