= Frank Bonilla =

American professor of Puerto Rican studies

- Born: February 3, 1925; New York City, New York
- Died: December 28, 2010 (aged 85)
- Education: CUNY (BA); Harvard University (PhD)
- Military career
- Branch: United States Army
- Units: 290th Infantry Regiment, 75th Infantry
- Conflicts: World War II - Battle of the Bulge
- Awards: Bronze Star
- Other work: Professor

Frank Bonilla (February 3, 1925 – December 28, 2010) was an American academic of Puerto Rican descent who became a leading figure in Puerto Rican Studies. After earning his doctorate from Harvard University, where his dissertation was supervised by Talcott Parsons, he held faculty positions at Massachusetts Institute of Technology, Stanford University, and the City University of New York. He was a key figure in the establishment of the Puerto Rican Hispanic Leadership Forum and the Center for Puerto Rico Studies at the City University of New York.

== Early life and education ==
Bonilla was born in New York City in 1925. His parents were both from Puerto Rico and had moved to the United States early in their lives. His mother emigrated to the United States in hopes of attending college, while his father, a former cigar maker and U.S. Cavalry serviceman, was on the same ship. The two met during the voyage and began a relationship.

Bonilla was raised around East Harlem, a neighborhood full of diversity of culture and race. He said that children were very often exposed to multiple languages at an early age and that they became bilingual to interact with people in their day-to-day lives. Bonilla spent his first years of high school attending a Franciscan high school in Illinois, where he showed academic and leadership skills. His favorite subjects were classical Greek, Latin, Spanish, French, and German. He was also elected President of his class. Bonilla then transferred to Morris High School (Bronx, New York).

== Career ==
After he graduated from Morris High in 1943, he was drafted and assigned to a weapons platoon. Bonilla was taught to be a mortar gunner and was assigned to the 290th Infantry Regiment, 75th Infantry Division.

=== World War II service ===
The 290th Infantry Regiment, 75th Infantry Division was involved in the Battle of the Bulge. Bonilla served in this battle at the front of the line for nearly a month.

After serving at the front lines, Bonilla sustained an injury and had to be hospitalized in France. After a brief three week hospitalization, Bonilla was reassigned to a replacement depot in France. It was there that he was invited to join the Puerto Rican National Guard near Frankfurt and assigned as the company clerk. He soon realized that the Puerto Rican soldiers had a divide. The Puerto Rican soldiers raised in the United States were looked down upon by those who had grown up in Puerto Rico, and referred to the emigrated Puerto Ricans as "American Joes". Bonilla said of this experience, "The military experience helped to consolidate my sense of being Puerto Rican and also a sense of wanting to study and be a scholar."

=== Post-war career ===
Bonilla returned to the United States after he was discharged from the military and made use of the educational benefits of the G.I. Bill to attend the College of the City of New York. He graduated cum laude in 1949 with a B.A. in business administration. He went on to pursue a master's degree in sociology from New York University, which he earned in 1954. He attended Harvard University and received a doctorate in sociology soon after. In 1965 his name appeared on a list of academics involved with Project Camelot.

For 20 years, he directed CUNY's Center for Puerto Rican Studies, where he served as founding director until his retirement in 1995. He also played a key role in the formation of the Puerto Rican Hispanic Leadership Forum to help manage the needs of Puerto Ricans in New York. Bonilla also co-founded the Inter-University Program for Latino Research at the City University of New York, a consortium for research that includes over 20 universities.

=== Legacy ===
The Frank Bonilla Public Intellectual Award was created in his honor by the Latin American Studies Association (LASA). The award is offered every other year.
