= AnnaMaria Cardinalli =

American opera singer

- Born: AnnaMaria Cardinalli-Padilla; 1979 (age 46–47); Santa Fe, New Mexico, U.S.
- Education: Saint Mary's College of California (B.A.); St. John's College (M.A.); University of Notre Dame (Ph.D.)
- Parent: Giovanna Cardinalli
- Awards: Joint Service Civilian Commendation Medal; Secretary of Defense Medal; Mother Teresa Award
- Website: www.annamaria.ws

AnnaMaria Cardinalli (née AnnaMaria Cardinalli-Padilla; born 1979) is an American military investigator, classical guitarist, and operatic contralto.

== Education ==
Cardinalli graduated from high school at the age of 14 and college at the age of 18. Her M.A. was awarded at age 20, and, at the age of 24, she became the youngest person to complete a doctoral degree at the University of Notre Dame. She received a B.A. in Performing Arts from St. Mary's College of California, her M.A. in the Great Books Program from St. John's College in Santa Fe, and completed her Ph.D. in Theology, where she majored in Liturgical Studies with a minor in Latino Studies. Her doctoral research focused upon the music and worship practices of the Penitentes, a secretive Catholic religious society with roots in medieval Spain.

Also at 14, Cardinalli published the nonfiction book Why Wait? Graduate! (Northwest Publishing, 1995), intended to assist other students seeking early graduation from high school.

== Musical career ==
Cardinalli, performing as "AnnaMaria", is a classical and flamenco guitarist, as well as an operatic contralto, noted by reviewers for both technical complexity and a feminine sensuality in her interpretive style. Her performances include a solo recital at the Kennedy Center, appearances for the Prince of Spain and Pope John Paul II, and multiple performances of the Concierto de Aranjuez with various orchestras.

Operatic roles of note have included the First Norn in Wagner's Gotterdammerung at New York's Lincoln Center and La Zia Principessa in Puccini's Suor Angelica, which Cardinalli has performed frequently in the United States and Europe. Cardinalli's discography includes guitar and vocal work, as well as one operatic contribution to a hip-hop album featuring Kanye West and John Legend.

A characteristic of Cardinalli's career is the extent to which she donates proceeds and performs benefit engagements to assist Catholic, humanitarian, and veterans' causes. In 2015, examples included a filmed concert benefiting the preservation of San Miguel Mission, the oldest church in the U.S., which airs frequently on the global cable network EWTN (with a reach of 250 million homes in 140 countries), and a New York performance of Elgar's Sea Pictures, a rarely performed song cycle for contralto with Orchestra Amadeus to benefit the anti-human-trafficking efforts of Covenant House with homeless youth. By 2017, she announced that all proceeds from her future musical endeavors will be donated to the charitable ends of a Catholic organization which seeks to open a home for children at risk for exploitation and works currently in outreach to the homeless.

Cardinalli highly credits Janice Pantazelos as her vocal instructor and Craig Alden Dell as her guitaristic inspiration.

Working as AnnaMaria, Cardinalli has released 12 CD's.

== Investigative career ==
Independent of her more public musical career, Cardinalli's previous employers include the FBI and the Joint Special Operations Command, as well as the U.S. Marine Corps, working in Helmand Province, Afghanistan while serving on a Human Terrain Team. She is the owner of D'Angelo Global Solutions, a consulting firm functioning as a Private Military Company (PMC) and security operation. Cardinalli is a licensed private investigator.

During her time with the Human Terrain Team, Cardinalli was tasked to research the sexual practices of the Pashtun. Her investigation and subsequent report brought to light the prevalent sexual abuse of young boys, and as Sara Carter described it in the Washington Examiner, the "vast gulf between U.S. and Afghan attitudes about homosexuality and pedophilia".

Cardinalli asserts that the practice of abuse plays a role in the early development of terrorists and describes how child sex slaves are often trapped and hidden as young “recruits” to various police, military, and insurgent organizations in Afghanistan. Cardinalli's report led to the announcement that "NATO officials have been aware of the recruitment problem for some time, and the former military commander, Gen. Stanley A. McChrystal, issued an order in 2010 warning troops to be on the lookout for under-age recruits."

By 2011, international pressure, significantly fueled by the attention to Cardinalli’s report, led Afghanistan to enter into a historic agreement with the United Nations to “to stop the recruitment of children into its police forces and ban the common practice of boys being used as sex slaves by military commanders.”

While the sexuality issue was leaked, and is therefore the most publicized aspect of her investigative career, it is not indicative of its extent. Cardinalli has been associated with the inception of the U.S. Marine Corps Female Engagement Team, the first official involvement of women in an operational capacity "outside the wire", and served as a member of, and mentor to, the first team.

== Controversy ==
Cardinalli's work on sexuality came to national media attention in late 2010. Her report was covered by Joel Brinkley in the San Francisco Chronicle, the Washington Examiner, CNN, Fox News and other media outlets.

Cardinalli's better-known musical background caused some responders to question her selection as a researcher for this topic. Cardinalli's academic biography, however, provides insight by mentioning her study of the religious and socio-cultural dynamics underlying conflict between Islamic and western cultures, and her previous use of the ethnographic research techniques required for Human Terrain work.

In 2012, a reversal occurred in the U.S. administration’s stance on the issue, when a “U.S. military handbook for troops deployed to the Middle East ordered soldiers not to make derogatory comments about the Taliban or criticize pedophilia.”

However, some high-ranking military officials continued to support Cardinalli’s original condemnation of the pedophilia issue as both a moral and critical security concern. U.S. Marine General John R. Allen, the top commander in Afghanistan, did not endorse the handbook and rejected a proposed forward drafted by Army officials in his name. “He does not approve of its contents,” according to a military spokesman quoted in the Wall Street Journal.

Beyond the report, Cardinalli has articulated her insistence on the non-acceptance of pedophilia as a “cultural norm,” pointing out its role in the psychological development of extremist fighters and its damaging impact on affected cultures, both in media interviews subsequent to the report's leak, and in the book Crossing the Wire: One Woman’s Journey into the Hidden Dangers of the Afghan War. (ISBN 9781612001913) Cardinalli remains an advocate against human trafficking and the exploitation of children, and donates a portion of book proceeds to the Polaris Project.

While listing her credentials as a professor of National Security and Intelligence studies, Cardinalli does acknowledge having worked "as a contractor on numerous intelligence, training, defense, and counterintelligence/security projects." It is also known that Cardinalli was a commissioned officer in the U.S. Navy, though injury appears to have discontinued that service.

== Academic appointments and awards ==
Cardinalli has served on the faculty of the Graduate Program of Intelligence and National Security Studies at American Military University. Cardinalli’s military and civilian awards include the Joint Service Civilian Commendation Medal and the Secretary of Defense Medal for the Global War on Terrorism. She is a 2009 Laureate of the Mother Teresa Award for her artistic efforts, and the 2023 recipient of Notre Dame's Rev. Arthur S. Harvey Award for the promotion of a Catholic vision of social justice through excellence in the performing arts.

== Personal life ==
In the 2018 EWTN program Enduring Legacy, which is hosted and features performances by Cardinalli, she refers to herself as a member of an Association of the Faithful seeking to become a Society of Apostolic Life in the Roman Catholic Archdiocese of Santa Fe. (This lengthy progression of titles is typical of the Catholic canonical process for the establishment of new religious orders.)

She announced taking vows in the Association, called Familia Victricis, in 2017. According to the Principles of Foundation of the emerging society, the vows of poverty, chastity, and obedience will bind her to donate all earnings from future work to the ends of the order, which, among other goals, seeks to establish an orphanage for the rescue and recovery of children exploited through current conflicts and crises as well as American children at risk for exploitation.

== Bibliography ==
In addition to the publications below, Cardinalli authors media content for Ascension Press archived here and Catholic365 archived here.

- AnnaMaria Cardinalli, Music and Meaning in the Mass. Sophia Institute Press, 2020. ISBN 978-1-64413-281-4
- AnnaMaria Cardinalli, Crossing the Wire: One Woman's Journey into the Hidden Dangers of the Afghan War. Casemate Publishers, 2013. ISBN 9781612001913
- Cardinalli-Padilla, AnnaMaria. El Llanto: A Liturgiological Journey Into the Identity and Theology of the Northern New Mexican Penitentes and Their Spiritual Siblings. Doctoral Dissertation, The University of Notre Dame, 2004.
- Annamaria Christina Padilla. Why Wait? Graduate. Northwest Publishing, 1995. ISBN 978-0-7610-0051-8

== Discography ==
- Global Guitar: A Prayer for Peace
- Enduring Legacy (DVD)
- Saving San Miguel Mission (DVD)
- Legado y Leyenda (DVD)
- Flamenco Steel
- El Duo Duende
- Sweet Night
- Sleep with the Angels
- Padre’s Footsteps
- Quinceañera
- Santa Fe Silver
- Spain Never Sleeps
- El Rosario
- Navidad
- AnnaMaria

== See also ==
- Bacha bazi (sexual slavery and child prostitution in Afghanistan)
- Military intelligence (a discussion of the discipline)
