= Project Camelot =

1964 U.S. Army project

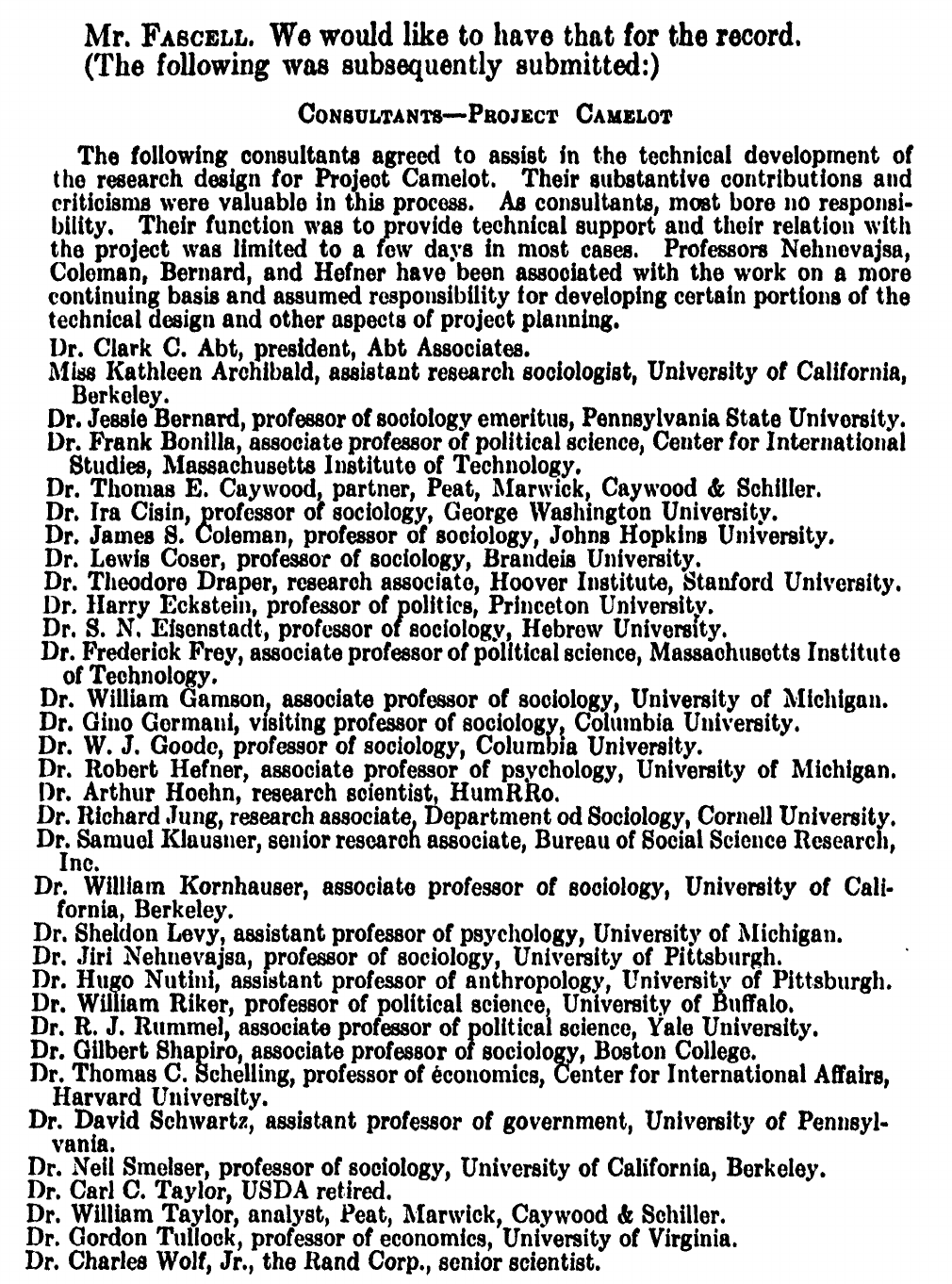
List submitted to Congressional Record of academics collaborating with Project Camelot

Project Camelot was the code name of a counterinsurgency study begun by the United States Army in 1964. The full name of the project was Methods for Predicting and Influencing Social Change and Internal War Potential. The project was executed by the Special Operations Research Office (SORO) at American University, which assembled an eclectic team of psychologists, sociologists, anthropologists, economists, and other intellectuals to analyze the society and culture of numerous target countries, especially in Latin America.

The goal of the project was to enhance the Army's ability to predict and influence social developments in foreign countries. The motive was described by an internal memo on December 5, 1964: "If the U.S. Army is to perform effectively its part in the U.S. mission of counterinsurgency it must recognize that insurgency represents a breakdown of social order and that the social processes involved must be understood."

Controversy arose around Project Camelot when professors in South America discovered its military funding and criticized its motives as imperialistic. The US Department of Defense ostensibly canceled Project Camelot on July 8, 1965 but continued the same research more discreetly.

== Background ==
=== Military-funded social science ===
Government-funded social science projects, especially in the field of psychology, increased dramatically during and after World War II. By 1942 the federal government was the leading employer of psychologists, most of whom it coordinated through the Office of Scientific Research and Development. The military employed psychologists to study tactics in psychological warfare and propaganda as well as studying the United States troops themselves. Research in psychological warfare was widespread, and according to University of Michigan psychologist Dorwin Cartwright, "the last few months of the war saw a social psychologist become chiefly responsible for determining the week-by-week-propaganda policy for the United States government."

The Office of Strategic Services also cultivated a Psychology Division, directed by Robert Tryon, to study the group behavior of humans for warfare purposes. A memo from William J. Donovan in November 1941 called for collection of information about the personality and social relations of "potential enemies" and for the creation of an intelligence organization "to analyze and interpret such information by applying to it not only the experience of Army and Naval Officers, but also of specialized trained research officials in the relative scientific fields, including technological, economic, financial, and psychological scholars."

In Britain, an interdisciplinary study called Mass-Observation was used by the Ministry of Information to evaluate the effectiveness of war propaganda and other influences on public behavior. Germany maintained a special cadre of military psychologists which assisted the Ministry of Propaganda, the Gestapo, and the Nazi party.

Military social science projects increased after the war, though under a reorganized structure under the Office of Naval Research and often contracted to private institutions. Project TROY at the Massachusetts Institute of Technology—a study of "getting the truth behind the Iron Curtain"— exemplified the new model. Project TROY lead to the creation of MIT's Center for International Studies (CENIS), which received funding from the Ford Foundation and the CIA to continue its mostly-classified research on "political warfare." The armed forces and Central Intelligence Agency pursued these projects independently of civilian oversight, despite presidential directives such as Eisenhower's NSC-59 which called for coordination of research under the Department of State.

=== Counterinsurgency studies ===
By the late 1950s, military-funded social science research had expanded from group dynamics and psychological operations to interdisciplinary counterinsurgency studies, seeking to explicate a continuum of social situations from stability to revolution. Counterinsurgency studies built on wartime findings on crowd psychology, morale, and national identity, while incorporating interdisciplinary perspectives from economics, sociology, and developmental psychology.

An instigator of this change, and progenitor of Project Camelot, was the Research Group in Psychology and the Social Sciences, or "Smithsonian Group", established by the Assistant Secretary of Defense for Research and Engineering and hosted by the Smithsonian Institution. The Smithsonian Group comprised intellectuals from the RAND Corporation, the Psychological Corporation, General Electric, the Russell Sage Foundation, the Smithsonian itself, and the American Association for the Advancement of Science, as well as top universities including University of Michigan, Vanderbilt, Princeton, Harvard, Yale, and Northwestern. The new use for social science in this model was predicting the behavior of potential enemies. Therefore, as Princeton professor Harry Eckstein wrote in a report for the Smithsonian Group:

There is practically no limit to the research that can be, and ought to be, undertaken on the subject of internal war. In a sense, the study of internal war is commensurate with the whole study of society, even peaceable society, for anything that increases our knowledge of social order can potentially increase our understanding of civil disorder.

— Harry Eckstein, "Internal War: The Problem of Anticipation", 1962.

The recommendations of the Smithsonian Group led to a wave of research programs, explicit changes in the funding priorities of the Advanced Research Projects Agency, and a March 26–28, 1962 symposium at the Special Operations Research Office called "The U.S. Army's Limited-War Mission and Social Science Research". This symposium, attended by 300 academics, was the first public effort to recruit social scientists for counterinsurgency research.

=== Geopolitical context ===
Vietnam, Laos, and Cambodia were obvious targets for the new techniques of social and psychological warfare. Tensions were also escalating in Latin America as the United States followed its pro-business agenda known as the Mann Doctrine. The populist president of Brazil, João Goulart, was forced from power in a United States-backed military coup on April 1, 1964, shortly after he promised the masses a program of land reform and industry nationalization. In the Andes Mountains (in Colombia, Ecuador, Peru, and Bolivia), multinational companies interested in sugar, mining, and petroleum faced strong resistance from indigenous people whose land they sought to expropriate. This indigenous bloc represented a formidable obstacle to corporate plans for resource extraction and thus was targeted from various directions, including population control programs and USAID assistance for national police and military forces. Military planners wanted an integrated team of social scientists to coordinate these different programs and enhance their effectiveness.

=== Special Operations Research Office ===
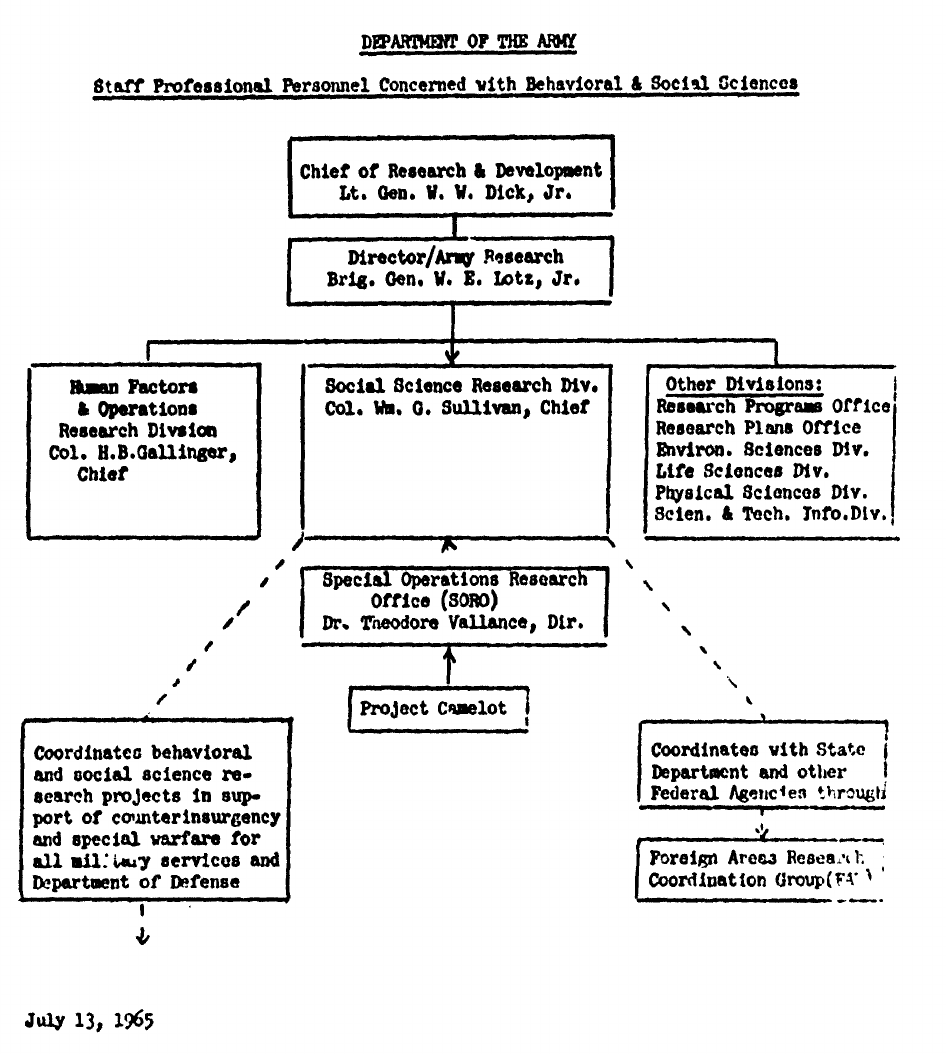
Chart entered into Congressional record describing the hierarchy pertaining to Project Camelot and the Special Operations Research Office

The Special Operations Research Office (SORO) was created at American University in 1956 by the Army's Psychological Warfare office. (In fact, it was at first called the Psychological and Guerrilla Warfare Research Office, PSYGRO, but this name was changed three days after American University and the Department of Defense signed a contract to create the agency.) Initially focused on creating handbooks for United States personnel overseas, SORO soon expanded into studies of the social context for counterinsurgency. Its researchers could pore through boxes of classified military and intelligence reports unavailable to most university researchers. By the 1960s, the Army was paying SORO $2 million each year to study topics as the effectiveness of United States propaganda and including research into the social and psychological makeup of peoples around the world.

SORO was directed by Theodore Vallance. Irwin Altman directed the division of psychological warfare research.

SORO was publicly known to conduct research in other countries on the effectiveness of United States ideological warfare. Echoing United States Information Agency director Edward R. Murrow, Vallance testified in 1963: "Mr. Murrow, I am sure, will agree with the general tenor of what I have to say, and you might consider my remarks as an extension of his general assertion in early testimony before this committee, that there is indeed a need for more and more better research to help in the guidance of our various and complex problems which make up the U.S. ideological offensive."

Vallance articulated his concept of counterinsurgency research more thoroughly with a 1964 article in American Psychologist, co-written with SORO colleague Dr. Charles Windle. "Psychological operations," they write, "include, of course, the relatively traditional use of mass media. In the cold war these operations are directed toward friendly and neutral as well as enemy countries. In addition, there is growing recognition of the possibility and desirability of using other means such as military movements, policy statements, economic transactions, and developmental assistance for psychological impact." The article also promoted "civic action" operations: "military programs, usually by indigenous forces and often aided by United States materiel and advice, to promote economic and social development and civilian good will in order to achieve political stability or a more favorable environment for the military forces."

== Concept and organization ==
The recommendations of the Smithsonian group passed to the Defense Science Board, which advanced the plan to create a massive database of social information. The order for a "centrally coordinated applied research effort" originated in early 1964 with Office of the Chief of Research and Development, and passed through the Office of the Director of Defense Research and Engineering and the Army Research and Development Office. By summer of 1964, the army had offered the project to the Special Operations and Research Office (SORO) at the American University of Washington DC. Its goal was to assess the causes of conflict between national groups, to anticipate social breakdown and provide eventual solutions.

The Army contracted with SORO to pay $4–6 million for 3–4 years of work. American University adopted a hands-off policy on the project, which it maintained throughout the controversy. The Director of the project was Rex Hopper, chairman of the sociology Department at Brooklyn College. The project attracted such notable intellectuals as James Samuel Coleman from Johns Hopkins, Thomas C. Schelling from Harvard, and Charles Wolf, Jr., of the RAND Corporation. Vallance wrote in 1965 that he had spread word of Camelot to "65 of the best and best-known members of the social science fraternity."

=== Documentation of project's role ===
On December 4, 1964, Theodore Vallance sent out a letter to a list of academics worldwide who were considered for involvement. The letter described the project as follows:

Project CAMELOT is a study whose objective is to determine the feasibility of developing a general social systems model which would make it possible to predict and influence politically significant aspects of social change in the developing nations in the world. Somewhat more specifically, its objectives are:

First, to devise procedures for assessing the potential for internal war within national societies;

Second, to identify with increased degrees of confidence those actions which a government might take to relieve conditions which are assessed as giving rise to a potential for internal war; and

Finally, to assess the feasibility of prescribing the characteristics of a system for obtaining and using the essential information for doing the above two things.

The letter indicated that the project would be well-funded by the United States military and that its first major target area would be Latin America. The context for Project Camelot, the letter said, included "much additional emphasis to the U.S. Army's role in the over-all U.S. policy of encouraging steady growth and change in the less developed countries in the world."

=== Scope ===
An internal memo issued by the Army's Office of the Chief of Research and Development on the next day, December 5, 1964, called for "comparative historical studies" in:

# (Latin America) Argentina, Bolivia, Brazil, Colombia, Cuba, Dominican Republic, El Salvador, Guatemala, Mexico, Paraguay, Peru, Venezuela.

1. (Middle East) Egypt, Iran, Turkey.
2. (Far East) Korea, Indonesia, Malaysia, Thailand.
3. (Others) France, Greece, Nigeria.

The same memo listed "survey research and other field studies" for Bolivia, Colombia, Ecuador, Paraguay, Peru, Venezuela, Iran, and Thailand. Teams of researchers were to work discreetly for a period of several months in their target countries, returning to Washington to write reports and process the information they gathered.

According to the December 5 memo,

The U.S. army counterinsurgency mission places broad responsibilities on the Army for planning and conducting operations involving a wide spectrum of sociopolitical problems which are integral parts of counterinsurgency operations. ... If the U.S. Army is to perform effectively its part in the U.S. mission of counterinsurgency it must recognize that insurgency represents a breakdown of social order and that the social processes involved must be understood. Converely, the processes which produce a stable society must also be understood.

=== Plan to create a database ===
The information gathered by the researchers would funnel into a large computerized database containing useful information about foreign areas. This information would be used for forecasting and social engineering, as well as active counterinsurgency. SORO planned eventually to automate this system for autonomous data analysis and prediction of social instability.

=== Scale ===
According to sociologist Irving Louis Horowitz, academics saw Project Camelot as a social science equivalent of the Manhattan Project. " Social science already worked extensively with the military, and thus to insiders Project Camelot was considered unique because of its scale more so than its underlying ideology. Its scale was unprecedented for a social science project, though unspectacular for a military budget item. The Department of Defense's annual spending on psychology research had risen from $17.2 million in 1961 to $31.1 million in 1964. Spending on other social sciences increased from $0.2 million to $5.7 million during the same period.

=== Motives for participation ===
The motives of academics for joining the project, which themselves became a topic of some discussion, varied widely. The project's director, Rex Hopper, had prophesied the possibility of revolution, even in the United States, resulting from the "emergence of a numerically significant, economically powerful, intellectually informed marginal group." Sociologists such as Jessie Bernard and Robert Boguslaw considered social change inevitable and professed a desire to see it take place non-violently. Some participants saw collaboration as an opportunity to guide the military towards less violent ways of accomplishing its goals. Still others saw an opportunity for free, even Platonically idealist thinking, outside the constraints of university academics. Researchers were enticed by the promise of studying new sources, including classified materials made available by the military; psychologists were excited to study data from wider populations than their usual samples of college freshmen.

=== Name ===
According to the testimony of SORO director Theodore Vallance, the code name Camelot came from the premise of a peaceful and harmonious society of Arthurian legend, as envisioned by T.H. White. (Some Spanish speakers may have been more likely to associate the name with the word camelo, meaning joke, or camello, meaning camel.)

== Disclosure ==
Hugo Nutini, an Italian-born Chilean professor of Anthropology, was a consultant in the conceptual stages of Project Camelot and he asked for permission from SORO to approach Chilean social scientists with the idea of conducting a study in their country.

Nutini wrote to Alvaro Bunster, Secretary General of the University of Chile, explaining: "The project in question is a kind of pilot study in which will participate sociologists, anthropologists, economists, psychologists, geographers and other specialists in the social sciences, and which will be supported by various scientific and governmental organizations in the United States." Nutini concealed the role of the Army in sponsoring the research—but the Chilean academics were skeptical.

Their fears were confirmed by professor Johan Galtung—then teaching at the Latin American Social Sciences Institute—who had rejected an invitation to an early conference about Project Camelot and produced the letter as proof. (Galtung had responded to project director Rex Hooper in a letter on April 22, 1965, rejecting the invitation and condemning the project's "imperialist features".)

Bunster expressed his doubts to colleagues who then confronted Nutini. When Nutini was unable to deny that the project had military backing, a letter to the editor was sent to the Latin American Review of Sociology and the whole affair was exposed in the media. Critics claimed that the project violated scientific professional ethics. (Ironically, Nutini had not been a central member of Project Camelot, nor had Chile had been listed as one of its first targets.) The Chilean Senate condemned Project Camelot as a form of imperialist intervention and vowed to investigate.

The U.S. invasion of the Dominican Republic in April 1965 sharply exacerbated concerns about military research by demonstrating the adoption of a more hardline doctrine towards Latin America. One Chilean newspaper suggested that the United States research prepared the way for a possible "anti-democratic coup" in Chile. The Soviet news agency Tass opined that Project Camelot provided "a vivid illustration of the growing efforts of the Pentagon to take into its own hands the conduct of U.S. foreign policy."

Embassy recently became aware through university community of serious anxiety middle-of-the-road scholars with this project and specifically with the manner in which university people here were approached by SORO personnel. I consider, particularly under current conditions, this effort to be seriously detrimental to U.S. interests in Chile and urgently request full explanation of Department Army actions in this regard. Was this project approved by the Department?

— U.S. Ambassador to Chile Ralph Dungan, Telegram to State Department, June 14, 1965

Official complaints from Chile prompted the State Department to deny its involvement, which further intensified the spotlight on role of the Army in organizing the research. The issue became known to the United States public through newspaper stories beginning on June 27, 1965, and three days later Congress resolved to respond.

== Cancellation and continuation ==
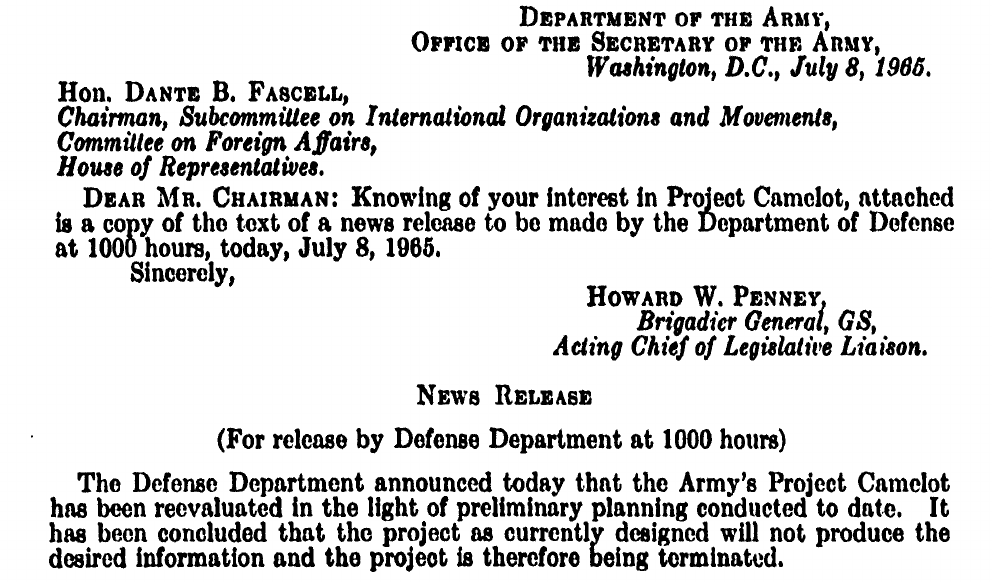
Reproduction of letter from the U.S. Army, informing Congressman Dante B. Fascell that "Project Camelot" has been canceled on the day hearings are scheduled to begin

The Office of the Secretary of Defense publicly ordered the cancellation of Project Camelot on July 8, 1965—the same day Congressional investigations began. Secretary of Defense McNamara's press release said his office had "concluded that the project as currently designed will not produce the desired information and the project is therefore being terminated." On August 5, 1965, President Lyndon Johnson publicly instructed the Secretary of State to review all government sponsorship of foreign area research.

=== Effect on social science ===
Among social scientists in the United States, the publicity around the project led to a discussion about the appropriate relationship of academics to the military. Commentators identified an apparently conservative influence of Army sponsorship on sociological investigation, citing the central focus on "stability" as the most desired outcome. Anthropologists were more critical of the project than followers of other disciplines, and the American Anthropological Association later passed a resolution against participation in "clandestine intelligence activities" along with a nonbinding ethical code for practitioners. On the whole, however, United States social scientists did not contest the validity of working with the government to analyze and influence foreign societies.

In Latin America, the backlash against Project Camelot created problems for United States social scientists wishing to study there overtly. Chile banned Hugo Nutini from returning to the country.

=== Continuation of research ===
SORO changed its name to the Center for Research on Social Systems (CRESS) and received an annual grant it had requested for discretionary spending, along the model pioneered by the RAND Corporation and the United States Air Force. The army assigned a uniformed representative to maintain daily presence at the research office. American University severed its relationship with the SORO/CRESS entirely in 1969.

However, policy makers indicated clearly that research of this type would continue. Congress reaffirmed the importance of behavioral science research for national security and vowed to maintain funding for these projects. And indeed, Congress increased the Department of Defense budget for behavioral and social science research from $27.3 million in 1965 to $34 million in 1966. Social scientists noted hopefully, if with regret for the circumstances, Congress's ratification of their discipline's legitimacy.

An 18 August 1965 memo from Director of Defense Research and Engineering Harold Brown called for better operational secrecy to rectify the cause of the Department's recent embarrassment:

Sensitive aspects of work having primary interest to the US Government (as opposed to a foreign government) must be treated in such a way that offense to foreign governments and propaganda advantage to the communist apparatus are avoided. This means that task statements, contracts, working papers, reports, etc. which refer to US assistance or potential US assistance to foreign countries in the internal defense area; or which express US concern over internal violence or revolution, whether communist inspired or not; or which refer to the development or examination of US policies for the purpose of influencing allied policies or actions; or which could imply US interference or intervention into the internal affairs of a foreign government, will have to be classified and marked as not for disclosure to foreign nationals except where a specific and well-considered exception is made.

A directive released on July 9 explicitly called for the social science research to continue, subdivided into smaller tasks rather than classified under one label. Social scientists made visits to target countries in July and August 1965, despite the protests of ambassadors fearing continued blowback. Code names for the new Camelot subdivisions included "Project Simpatico" in Colombia and "Operation Task" in Peru. Researchers for Project Simpatico asked rural Colombians questions such as, "If a leader of the people should arise, should he be tall, short, white, black, armed, married, over 40 years of age, or under?" Revelation of a similar project in Quebec induced Vallance to write an apology letter to Canadian Prime Minister Lester Pearson.

The military continued to contract with private firms, such as Simulmatics Corporation, which in 1966 deployed a team of researchers to Vietnam to create psychological profiles of the natives.

=== POLITICA ===
The "POLITICA" computer program confirmed the Chileans' fears of an "antidemocratic coup". Project Camelot consultant Clark Abt received the Pentagon contract to create Politica later in 1965. As described in 1965, POLITICA was

designed to reproduce the role of the military and other factions in the politics and economic dynamics of a nation by structuring the roles of major national actors and groups, placing them in conflict or cooperation in a game environment and identifying from the resulting interaction the societal and human variables relevant to the study of incipient insurgency. By sequential search of various patterns of variables under various initial conditions, the game is designed to highlight those variables decisive for the description, indication, prediction, and control of internal revolutionary conflict.

— Gordon, Blaxall, Del Solar, Moore, & Merrill, "COCON-counterconspiracy (POLITICA): The development of a simulation of internal national conflict under revolutionary conflict conditions"; Abt Associates, Inc., November 17, 1965.

Inputs to the program included a list of at least forty groups of variables, such as popular trust in institutions, cultural values, paranoia, hostility toward outsiders, attitudes towards change, institutional alignments, and other such analytical concepts from social science.

This automated simulation based on social science data did indeed serve as justification for the U.S.-backed coup d'état which took place in 1973. Researchers ran a version of the simulation "to determine if the situation in Chile would be 'stable' after a military-take over if Allende were still alive. It was determined by analysts based on POLITICA that Allende should not be allowed to live."

== Academic participants ==
- Clark Abt, Abt Associates
- Kathleen Archibald, sociology, UC Berkeley
- Jessie Bernard, sociology, Pennsylvania State University
- Frank Bonilla, political science, Massachusetts Institute of Technology, Center for International Studies
- Thomas Caywood, partner, Peat, Marwick, Caywood & Schiller
- Ira Cisin, sociology, George Washington University
- James Samuel Coleman, sociology, Johns Hopkins University
- Lewis A. Coser, sociology, Braindeis University
- Theodore Draper, Stanford University, Hoover Institute
- Harry Eckstein, political science, Princeton
- Shmuel Eisenstadt, Hebrew University
- Frederick Frey, political science, Massachusetts Institute of Technology
- William Gamson, sociology, University of Michigan
- Gino Germani, sociology, Columbia University
- W. J. Goode, sociology, Columbia University
- Robert Hefner, psychology, University of
- Arthur Hoehn, Human Resources Research Organization (HumRRO)
- Richard Jung, sociology, Cornell University
- Samuel Klausner, Bureau of Social Science Research, Inc.
- William Kornhauser, sociology, UC Berkeley
- Sheldon Levy, psychology, University of Michigan
- Jiri Nehnevajsa, sociology, University of Pittsburgh
- Hugo Nutini, anthropology, University of Pittsburgh
- William Riker, political science, University of Buffalo
- Rudolph J. Rummel, political science, Yale University
- Gilbert Shapiro, sociology, Boston College
- Thomas C. Schelling, economics, Harvard University, Center for International Affairs
- David Schwartz, government, University of Pennsylvania
- Neil Smelser, sociology, UC Berkeley
- Carl C. Taylor, USDA retired
- William Taylor, analyst, Peat, Marwick, Caywood & Schiller
- Gordon Tullock, economics, University of Virginia
- Charles Wolf Jr. of Michigan, RAND Corporation

== See also ==
- Computational sociology
- Human Terrain System
- Institute for Defense Analysis
- Minerva Initiative
- Political Instability Task Force
