= Beatrice Jauregui =

Anthropologist

Beatrice Jauregui is an anthropologist specialising in policing, social dynamics and state power. She is currently teaching at the Centre for Socio-legal Studies, University of Toronto.

== Career ==
She delivered the Annual Roger Hood Lecture at the University of Oxford Centre for Criminology, in 2024. She is currently lead investigator of a study comparing policing in Brazil, Canada, India, Mexico and the US commissioned by the Social Sciences and Humanities Research Council (SSHRC).

== Publications ==
Her ethnographic study on policing in India was published by the University of Chicago in 2016, titled Provisional Authority: Police, Order, and Security in India. She dwells on the provisional nature of police power and by extension the state power and concludes that many of the concerns she identified in the study are not confined to India but probably applicable across the world. The work provides an anthropological perspective to an area that is mostly studied by sociologists and criminologists.

Jauregui co-edited the Handbook of Global Policing (published by Sage in 2016) and Anthropology and Global Counterinsurgency (published by University of Chicago in 2010).
