= Chehel Gazi =

- Location in Afghanistan
- Coordinates: 36°43′48″N 66°59′30″E
- Country: Afghanistan
- Province: Balkh Province
- Time zone: + 4.30

Chehel Gazi is a village in Balkh Province in northern Afghanistan.

== See also ==
- Balkh Province
