= Cintra Wilson =

American writer, performer and cultural critic

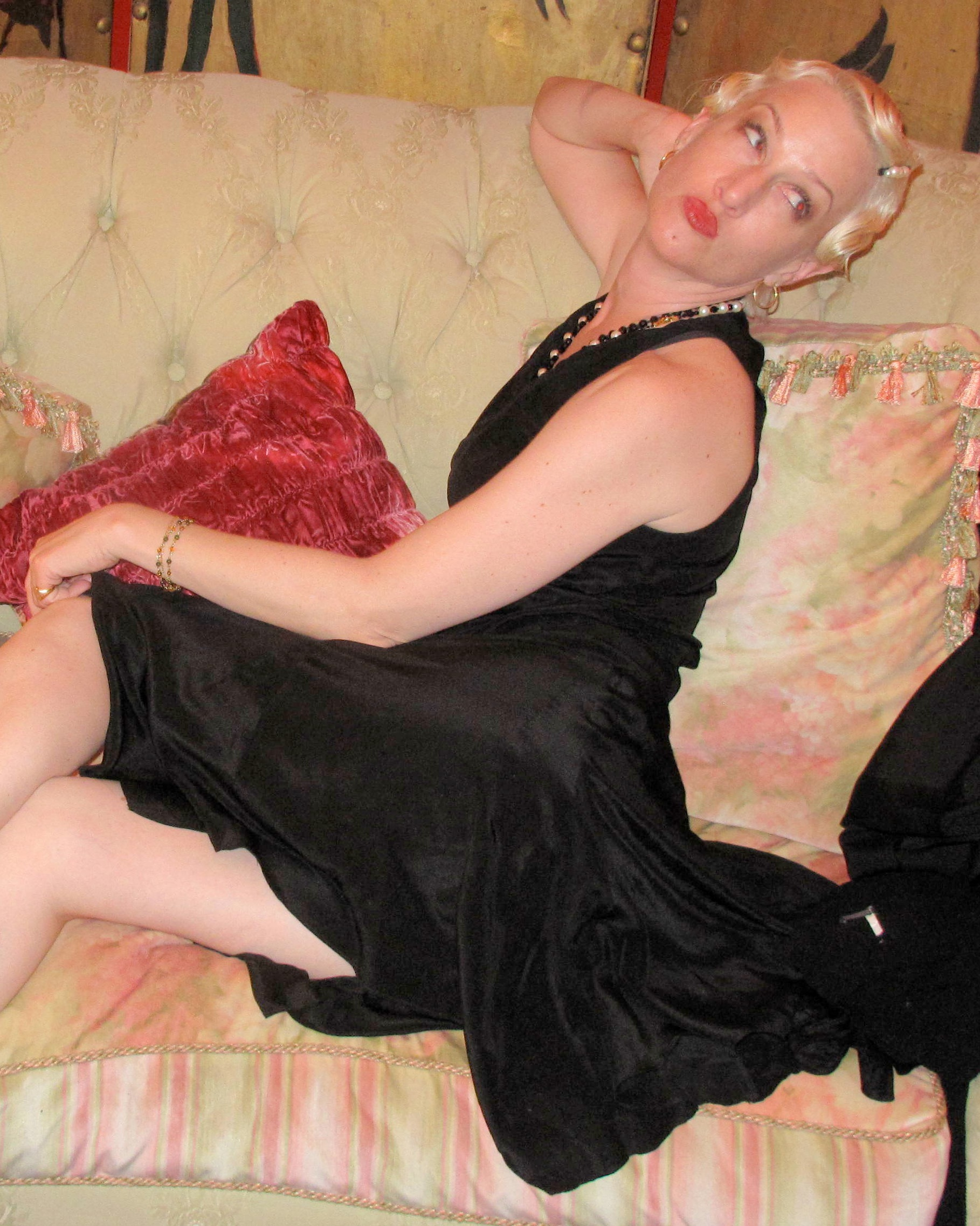
- Wilson in August 2009
- Born: Cintra E. Wilson; October 9, 1967 (age 59); Chico, California, U.S.
- Occupations: Writer, actress
- Years active: 1988–present

Cintra Wilson (born October 9, 1967) is an American writer, performer and cultural critic. Dubbed "the Dorothy Parker of the cyber age" and "Hunter S. Thompson with ovaries", she is best known for her commentary on popular culture which is often humorous and irreverent in tone. She contributed to The New York Times for its "Critical Shopper" series and was at the time named as one of the 50 "most influential people working in New York fashion". Wilson is also a regular contributor to the Hartford Advocate for her political column "The C Word". Her books include Fear and Clothing: Unbuckling American Style; A Massive Swelling: Celebrity Re-examined as a Grotesque Crippling Disease; Colors Insulting to Nature; and Caligula for President: Better American Living Through Tyranny. She wrote a bi-weekly column called The Dregulator, which critiqued the tabloid culture and was syndicated in a number of alternative weeklies. She was a frequent contributor to Salon.com from 1994 to 2007.

== Early life and career ==
Wilson was born on October 9, 1967, in Butte County, California. She grew up initially in Chico, and later in Marin County, California, where she attended Tamalpais High School. After dropping out of high school, Wilson went to San Francisco State University. She was an avant-garde playwright in San Francisco as well as a contributor to Frisko magazine and the San Francisco Examiner, where she wrote a weekly advice column called "Cintra Wilson Feels Your Pain." Her first play, Juvee, based on her experiences in juvenile hall, was produced when she was 20. She lived in Los Angeles for a time (where she was engaged to musician Kevin Gilbert at the time of his death), and now lives in New York City.

== Writing ==
She was a frequent contributor for Salon.com chronicling celebrity tabloid news and has provided frequent commentary on various award presentations, most notably the Oscars. She wrote for "Critical Shopper", a New York Times fashion column, and has been credited with bringing together "tremendous erudition and a singular approach to an otherwise disposable area of a newspaper". Wilson is also the creator and voice of Winter Steele, which was a puppet television series on MTV's Liquid Television in the early 1990s. Her column "The Dregulator" steadily evolved from a commentary on tabloid reportage to a purely political column called "The C Word" published by the Hartford Advocate, The Fairfield County Weekly and the New Haven Advocate. On December 6, 2010 Wilson wrote in support of WikiLeaks founder Julian Assange in "The C Word" entitled, "Julian Assange Isn't Doing Anything Worse Than What Our Government Is Doing".

Wilson was featured in Salon in 2008 for her political commentary on the Republican Party's then-candidate for Vice President, Sarah Palin, describing Palin as the "centerfold spread, revealing the ugliest underside of Republican ambitions – their insanely zealous and cynical drive to win power by any means necessary, even at the cost of actual leadership." In her trademark satirical rhetoric, she went on to describe Palin as "the White House bunny – the most nauseating novelty confection of the evangelical mind-set since Southern "chastity balls," wherein teen girls pledge abstinence from premarital sex by ceremonially faux-marrying their own fathers." Conversely, in a "C Word" article entitled The Hot and the Dead, Wilson had said of the Obama administration, “President Obama... is beginning to look merely ceremonial, like the Queen of England. Despite the fact that he relinquished none of the concentrated imperial superpowers and near-papal infallibility claimed for the Presidency by Cheney, Obama still doesn’t seem to have the right wooden stakes or zombie head-smashing shovels to actually implement any real reforms. He has been either unwilling or unable to sit on the lobbyists, who have been playing musical chairs and orgies of footsie around the public/private sectors since the Clinton era ...."

== Works ==
Books

- A Massive Swelling: Celebrity Re-examined as a Grotesque Crippling Disease and Other Cultural Revelations (2000) ISBN 978-0670891627
- Colors Insulting to Nature (2004) ISBN 978-0007154579
- Caligula for President: Better American Living Through Tyranny (2008) ISBN 978-1596915886
- Fear and Clothing: Unbuckling American Style (2015) ISBN 978-0-393-24840-1

Short Fiction

- Red Spiral Notebook (1995)
- The Abounding Gutter (2005)

Animated Series

- Winter Steele – for MTV's Liquid Television (1991–1993)

Plays

- Juvee (1988)
- Dognite (1989)
- The Bitzy La Fever's Kingdom of Passion Trilogy (1989)
- Arbuckle (1990)
- XXX Love Act (1992)
- Alien Soul (1994)
- Soul Hunt

Video Games

- Iron Helix (1993)
