= Network of Concerned Anthropologists =

The Network of Concerned Anthropologists (NCA) is a group of Anthropologists that formed in 2007 for the purpose of protesting the Iraq War.

== Beliefs ==
The group believed that anthropologists should not participate in any work involving the war on terror, due to believing it is unethical and that the US presence in Iraq was illegitimate.

The founding members of the Network of Concerned Anthropologists include Catherine Besteman, Andrew Bickford, Greg Feldman, Gustaaf Houtman, Roberto Gonzalez, Hugh Gusterson, Jean Jackson, Kanhong Lin, Catherine Lutz, David Price, and David Vine.
