= Neil L. Whitehead =

English anthropologist

- Born: 19 March 1956; U.K.
- Died: 22 March 2012 (aged 56); Madison, Wisconsin, U.S.
- Known for: Anthropology of violence, dark shamanism, kanaimá, post-human anthropology, historical anthropology and archaeology of South America and the Caribbean
- Scientific career
- Fields: Anthropology (Guyana, South America, Caribbean)
- Institutions: University of Wisconsin-Madison
- Thesis: The conquest of the Caribs of the Orinoco basin (1984)
- Website: Neil L Whitehead's academia.edu page

Neil L. Whitehead (19 March 1956 – 22 March 2012) was an English anthropologist, who is best known for his work on the anthropology of violence, dark shamanism (and Guyanese kanaimà in particular), post-human anthropology and the historical anthropology of South America and the Caribbean. From 1997 to 2007 he was the editor of Ethnohistory, Journal of the American Society for Ethnohistory.

== Bibliography ==
- 2013. Virtual War and Magical Death: Technologies and Imaginaries for Terror and Killing. Ed. with Sverker Finnstrom. Duke University Press.
- 2012. Human No More: Digital Subjectivities, Unhuman Subjects, and the End of Anthropology. Ed. with Michael Wesch. University Press of Colorado.
- 2011. Of Cannibals and Kings. Primal Anthropology in the Americas. Pennsylvania University Press.
- 2009. Anthropologies of Guayana. Ed. with Stephanie Aleman. Arizona University Press.
- 2008. Hans Staden's True History. An Account of Cannibal Captivity. Duke University Press.
- 2005. Terror and Violence: Imagination and the Unimaginable Ed. with Andrew Strathern and Pamela Stewart. Pluto Press.
- 2004. Violence. Ed. SAR/James Currey Press.
- 2004. In Darkness and in Secrecy. The Anthropology of Assault Sorcery in Amazonia. Ed. with Robin Wright. Duke University Press.
- 2003. Histories and Historicities in Amazonia. Ed. University of Nebraska Press.
- 2002. Dark Shamans. Kanaimá and the Poetics of Violent Death. Duke University Press.
- 2001. Beyond the Visible and the Material: The Amerindianization of Society in the Work of Peter Rivìere. Ed. with Laura Rival. Oxford University Press.
- 2000. War in the Tribal Zone. Expanding States and Indigenous Warfare. Ed. with R. Brian Ferguson. School of American Research Press.
- 1997. The Discoverie of the Large, Rich and Bewtiful Empire of Guiana by Sir Walter Ralegh. Edited, annotated and transcribed by Neil L. Whitehead.
- 1995. Wolves from the Sea. Readings in the Archaeology and Anthropology of the Island Caribs. Ed. KITLV Press.
- 1992. Wild Majesty. Encounters with Caribs from Columbus to the Present Day. An Anthology. Ed. with Peter Hulme. Oxford University Press.
- 1988. Lords of the Tiger Spirit. A History of the Caribs in Colonial Venezuela and Guyana 1498-1820. Foris Publications.

== Awards ==
- James Henry Breasted Prize (American Historical Association) for "Indigenous Cartography in Lowland South America and the Caribbean" in The History of Cartography II. 3, pp. 301–326. Ed. D. Woodward and G. M. Lewis. University of Chicago Press, 1998.
- The Rasputin Award (University of Wisconsin-Madison) for Dark Shamans. Kanaimá and the Poetics of Violent Death.
