= A Massive Swelling =

2000 essay collection by Cintra Wilson

- Author: Cintra Wilson
- Language: English
- Genre: Cultural commentary
- Publisher: Viking
- Publication date: 2000
- Pages: 256
- ISBN: 978-0-670-89162-7
- OCLC: 42771896
- Dewey Decimal: 306.4/84 21
- LC Class: PN1590.S6 W55 2000

A Massive Swelling: Celebrity Reexamined as a Grotesque, Crippling Disease and Other Cultural Revelations is a book of essays on celebrities and celebrity culture written by Cintra Wilson.

According to Wilson, celebrity status and the desire to attain it is a "grotesque crippling disease". Her subjects include Barbra Streisand, Michael Jackson, New Kids on the Block, Las Vegas, Plastic surgery, and Bill Gates. She criticises the machine that uses artists for a period of time and discards them once they become unprofitable. She focuses a good deal of attention on the influence of New York City and Los Angeles on the appetite for fame, as well as the media's ability to manipulate consumers into believing that celebrities are more physically equipped for success. She suggests that what is aggressively sought after and envied is nothing more than a facade.

Kirkus Reviews described it as "Rhinestone-studded prose, best taken in small doses, but with a backbone of rectitude that gives it substance." Variety described Wilson as a talented wordsmith but said that "she struggles to make the topics in this haphazardly organized volume seem anything but tired and obvious."
