= James Der Derian =

Professor of International Studies

James Der Derian is the Michael Hintze Chair of International Security Studies and Director of the Centre for International Security Studies at The University of Sydney, having taken up his appointment in January 2013. His research and teaching interests are in international security, information technology, international theory and documentary film.

Prior to his appointment, Der Derian was a Watson Institute research professor of international studies and professor of political science at Brown University. In July 2004, he became the director of the institute's Global Security Program. Der Derian also directed the Information Technology, War, and Peace Project in the Watson Institute's Global Security Program.

Der Derian was educated at McGill University and was a Rhodes Scholar at Balliol College at Oxford University, where he completed a M.Phil. and D.Phil. in international relations. At Balliol, his D.Phil. supervisor was Hedley Bull.

He has been a visiting scholar at the University of Southern California, MIT, Harvard, Oxford, Copenhagen University and at the Institute for Advanced Study in Princeton. He was also tenured at the University of Massachusetts Amherst.

He is author of On Diplomacy: A Genealogy of Western Estrangement (1987) and Antidiplomacy: Spies, Terror, Speed, and War (1992); editor of International Theory: Critical Investigations (1995) and The Virilio Reader (1998); co-editor with Michael Shapiro of International/Intertextual Relations: Postmodern Readings of World Politics (1989); Global Voices: Dialogues In International Relations (with others) (1993); and, Virtuous War: Mapping the Military-Industrial-Media-Entertainment Network (2001; 2nd edition, 2009). His most recent books are a collection of selected essays, titled Critical Practices of International Relations: Selected Essays (2009), and a co-edited volume with Alexander Wendt, Quantum International Relations: A Human Science for World Politics (2022).

His articles on international relations have appeared in the Review of International Studies, International Studies Quarterly, Cambridge Review of International Affairs, International Affairs, Brown Journal of World Affairs, Millennium, Alternatives, Cultural Values, Global Perspectives and Samtiden. His articles on war, technology, and the media have appeared in The New York Times, The Nation, The Australian, Washington Quarterly, and Wired.

Der Derian has produced three film documentaries with Udris Film, Virtual Y2K, After 9/11, and most recently, Human Terrain: War Becomes Academic, which won the Audience Award at the 2009 Festival dei Popoli in Florence and has been an official selection at numerous international film festivals. His documentary, Project Z: The Final Global (co-produced with Phillip Gara), premiered at the 2012 DOK Leipzig Film Festival. His most recent documentary, Project Q: War, Peace and Quantum Mechanics, premiered at the 2024 Melbourne Documentary Film Festival.

Der Derian is the recipient of the Bosch Berlin Prize in Public Policy and Fellow at the American Academy in Berlin from January - March 2011.
