= Hugh Gusterson =

- Education: Cambridge University (BA); University of Pennsylvania (MA); Stanford University (PhD)
- Scientific career
- Fields: Anthropology
- Workplaces: University of British Columbia; George Washington University; George Mason University; Massachusetts Institute of Technology

Hugh Gusterson is an English anthropologist at the University of British Columbia and George Washington University. His work focuses on nuclear culture, international security and the anthropology of science. His articles have appeared in the LA Times, the Boston Globe, the Boston Review the Washington Post, the Chronicle of Higher Education, Foreign Policy, and American Scientist. He is a regular contributor to the Bulletin of the Atomic Scientists and has a regular column in Sapiens, an anthropology journal.

== Biography ==
Hugh Gusterson grew up in England. He has a B.A. in history from Cambridge University, a master's degree in anthropology from the University of Pennsylvania (as a Thouron Scholar), and a PhD in anthropology from Stanford University. He taught at MIT from 1992-2006 before moving to George Mason University and George Washington University. Since 2020 he has taught for the anthropology department of the University of British Columbia.

His early work was on the culture of nuclear weapons scientists and antinuclear activists. In that work he explored weapons scientists' and activists' contending social constructions of weaponry and international peace and security. More recently he has written on teenage use of alcohol. and counterinsurgency in Iraq and Afghanistan, arguing that U.S. counterinsurgency campaigns would fail and, in the process, damage U.S. civil society as well as Iraq and Afghanistan. In 2016 he published Drone - a book about drone warfare that won the Roy C. Palmer Civil Liberties Prize at the Chicago-Kent College of Law. A leading critic of attempts to recruit anthropologists for counterinsurgency work, he is one of the founders of the Network of Concerned Anthropologists. He is currently researching the polygraph, as well as conducting a research project on nuclear waste disposal in Australia.

Gusterson served on the American Association of Anthropology's Executive Board from 2009–12, co-chaired the committee that rewrote the Association's ethics code 2012, and currently serves on the Association's Task Force on Engagement with Israel/Palestine. He was President of the American Ethnological Society from 2016-18. He won the American Anthropological Association's anthropology in media award in 2020.

He is married to Allison Macfarlane, former chairman of the Nuclear Regulatory Commission (NRC). They have two children.

== Works ==
- Nuclear Rites: A Weapons Laboratory at the End of the Cold War, University of California Press, 1998, ISBN 978-0-520-21373-9
- People of the Bomb: Portraits of America's Nuclear Complex, University of Minnesota Press, 2004, ISBN 978-0-8166-3860-4
- Drone Remote Control Warfare, MIT Press, 2016, ISBN 978-0-2620-3467-8

=== Editor ===
- Why America's top pundits are wrong: anthropologists talk back, editors Catherine Lowe Besteman, Hugh Gusterson, University of California Press, 2005, ISBN 978-0-520-24356-9
- The insecure American: how we got here and what we should do about it, editors Hugh Gusterson, Catherine Lowe Besteman, University of California Press, 2009, ISBN 978-0-520-25969-0
- Cultures of Insecurity: States, Communities, and the Production of Danger, editors Jutta Weldes, Mark Laffey, Hugh Gusterson, and Raymond Duvall, University of Minnesota Press, 1999.
- The Counter-Counterinsurgency Manual: Or, Notes on Demilitarizing Anthropology, edited by Network of Concerned Anthropologists, Prickly Paradigm Press, 2009
- Life by Algorithms, University of Chicago Press, 2020

=== Videos ===
- "Surprising Fact about Political Views of Nuclear Weapons Scientists", March 1, 2015 talk at the Helen Caldicott Symposium: The Dynamics of Possible Nuclear Extinction
- "Who are nuclear weapons scientists?", July 6, 2016 talk at TedxFoggyBottom at the George Washington University
- "Ethical Implications of Drone Warfare," February 5, 2019, LEAP Initiative Series at the Elliott School of International Affairs at the George Washington University.
- "Democracy, Hypocrisy, First Use" Harvard University November 4, 2017
- American Ethnological Society Presidential address July 10, 2017
- University of Sydney interview 2026 on nuclear Futures: https://www.youtube.com/watch?v=HLKs3-F9O4Y

=== Chapters ===
- "Remembering Hiroshima at a Nuclear Weapons Laboratory", Living with the bomb: American and Japanese cultural conflicts in the Nuclear Age, editors Laura Elizabeth Hein, Mark Selden, M.E. Sharpe, 1997, ISBN 978-1-56324-967-9
- "Nuclear Weapons Testing", Naked science: anthropological inquiry into boundaries, power, and knowledge, editor Laura Nader, Psychology Press, 1996, ISBN 978-0-415-91465-9
- "Becoming a Weapons Scientist", Technoscientific imaginaries: conversations, profiles, and memoirs, editor George E. Marcus, University of Chicago Press, 1995, ISBN 9780226504445
- "A Pedagogy of Diminishing Returns: Scientific Involution across Three Generations of Nuclear Weapons Science", Pedagogy and the practice of science: historical and contemporary perspectives, editor David Kaiser, MIT Press, 2005, ISBN 978-0-262-11288-8
- "Missing the End of the Cold War in International Security", Cultures of insecurity: states, communities, and the production of danger, editor Jutta Weldes, U of Minnesota Press, 1999, ISBN 978-0-8166-3308-1

=== Interviews ===
- "AE Interviews Hugh Gusterson (George Washington University): A conversation on his latest book Drone: Remote Control Warfare"
- Conversations in Anthropology@Deakin (Episode #10): Hugh Gusterson
- Covid and Culture interview on KNME TV, December 19, 2020
- We Have to Find a Way to Make the World Feel Secure interview by Peking Financial Review 2023

=== Other scholarly references ===
- Academia.edu
