= Constellation Software =

Software company in Canada

Constellation Software Inc.
- Type: Public
- Traded as: TSX: CSU; S&P/TSX 60 component
- Industry: IT services
- Founded: 1995; 31 years ago
- Founders: Mark Leonard
- Headquarters: Toronto, Ontario, Canada
- Area served: Worldwide
- Key people: John Billowits (Chairman of the Board); Jamal Baksh (Chief Financial Officer); Mark Miller (President & Chief Operating Officer)
- Services: Custom Computer Programming Services
- Revenue: ▲US$10.066 billion (2024)
- Net income: ▲US$767 millions (2024)
- Total assets: ▲US$12.863 billion (2024)
- Total equity: ▲US$3.288 billion (2024)
- Number of employees: 64,000
- Website: www.csisoftware.com

Constellation Software Inc. is a Canadian vertical market software company headquartered in Toronto, Ontario. It is listed on the Toronto Stock Exchange under the ticker CSU and is a constituent of the S&P/TSX 60.

The company was founded in 1995 by Mark Leonard, a former venture capitalist, and went public in 2006. Its core strategy is the acquisition and permanent ownership of vertical market software (VMS) businesses, software companies servicing a specific industry niche rather than a horizontal market. Since its founding, Constellation has acquired over 850 businesses across more than 100 industry vertical worldwide.

Constellation is widely studied by investors and capital allocators for its disciplined, decentralized acquisition model and its long-term compounding track record. Since its IPO, the stock has compounded at approximately 30% per annum.

== Business ==
The company's business strategy is to acquire software companies, and then hold them for the long term. It has acquired over 500 businesses since being founded. It focuses on vertical market software companies (i.e. those that create software for a particular industry or market, as opposed to creating software usable for a wide variety of markets). Most of its acquisitions are relatively small (for less than $5 million), although the company has indicated that it may pursue larger acquisitions in the future. For instance, Constellation acquired Acceo Solutions for $250 million in January 2018, its then second-largest acquisition. In March 2022, Constellation Software acquired Allscripts’ hospital business unit for $700m. As per the agreement, Allscripts will receive a fixed amount of $670m plus $30M as a performance bonus at the closing of the deal. Although the company has experienced great success with this strategy in the past (its stock has increased 30 times since its IPO in 2006), it has experienced more competition in acquiring companies in recent years, especially from private equity and hedge funds. As of 2016, 67% of revenue was from customers in the public sector, while the other 33% was from customers in the private sector. 12% of revenue was from Canada, 52% from the US, 30% from Europe, and 5% from the rest of the world.

== Operating segments ==
Constellation Software has seven operating segments:

- Volaris Group: focuses on acquiring software businesses serving various areas, including agri-business, financial services, and education. It has more than 150 constituent software businesses.
- Harris Computer Systems: primarily serves the public sector, including utilities, education, and healthcare, as well as the private technology, retail technologies, payment solutions and insurance sectors. It has over 100 constituent software businesses.
- Jonas Software: acquires niche software businesses or companies in the vertical market software industry. Focuses on B2B and has a heavy presence in North America, Europe, South America, Australia and New Zealand. Has 140 companies in its portfolio across 40+ major verticals in 2022, primarily in the hospitality and construction sectors.
- Vela Software: operates 8 divisions, primarily focuses on the industrial sector, including oil and gas and manufacturing
- Perseus Operating Group: operates 56 companies in a variety of industries, including home building, pulp and paper, dealerships, finance, healthcare, digital marketing, and real estate.
- Total Specific Solutions: focuses on software companies in the UK and Europe. Total was acquired in December 2013 for $360 million. In January 2021, this operating segment was spun-off to Topicus.com.
- Andromeda Software: acquires and supports vertical market software businesses with a long term ownership approach, operates over 30 companies across a variety of industries as the seventh operating group.

== Controversy ==
In 2016, the founder of Innoprise Software sued Harris Computer Systems for giving away its software for free, thus reducing the value of a revenue-sharing agreement.

In mid-2018, the company cancelled its quarterly earnings calls, a highly unusual step for a public company. Analysts suggest the company took this step because it was worried about leaking information about potential acquisitions to its competitors.

== Management team ==
As of September 25th 2025, the management team is composed of

- Mark Miller – President, COO and CEO
- Jamal Baksh – Chief Financial Officer
- Bernard Anzarouth – Chief Investment Officer
- Farley Noble – Senior Vice President
- Mark Dennison – General Counsel

== Business trend ==
	2016	2017	2018	2019	2020	2021	2022	2023	2024	2025
Total revenue (USD bn)	2.1	2.5	3.1	3.5	4.0	5.1	6.6	8.4	10.1	11.6
Operating income (USD bn)	0.3	0.4	0.5	0.5	0.7	0.9	0.9	1.1	1.5	1.9
Net income (USD bn)	0.2	0.2	0.4	0.3	0.4	0.3	0.5	0.6	0.7	0.5
Total assets (USD bn)	0.5	0.6	0.9	0.7	1.1	1.5	1.9	2.0	3.4	4.3
Total equity (USD bn)	1.9	2.3	2.9	3.5	4.4	5.8	7.9	10.9	12.9	16.2
