= Violence =

Use of physical force or psychological power with the intent to inflict harm

Violence is characterized as the use of physical force by humans to cause harm to other living beings, such as pain, injury, disablement, death, damage and destruction. The World Health Organization (WHO) defines violence as "the intentional use of physical force or power, threatened or actual, against oneself, another person, or against a group or community, which either results in or has a high likelihood of resulting in injury, death, psychological harm, maldevelopment, or deprivation"; it recognizes the need to include violence not resulting in injury or death.

== Categories ==
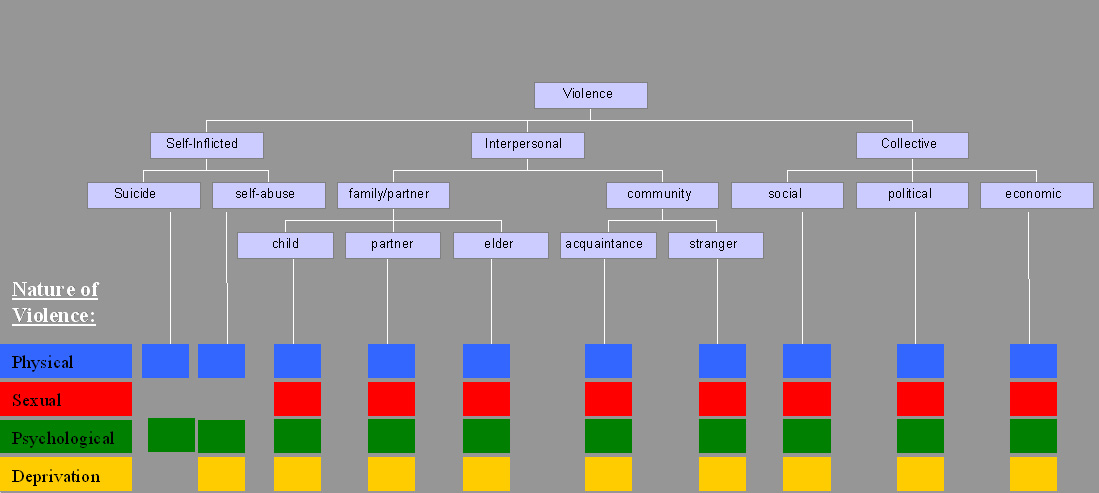
Typology of violence

The World Health Organization (WHO) divides violence into three broad categories: self-directed, interpersonal, and collective. This categorization differentiates between violence inflicted to and by oneself, by another individual or a small group, and by larger groups such as states. Alternatively, violence can primarily be classified as either instrumental or hostile.

=== Self-inflicted ===
Self-inflicted violence comes in two forms. The first is suicidal behaviour, which includes suicidal thoughts and suicide attempts. The second is self-harm, which includes acts such as self-mutilation.

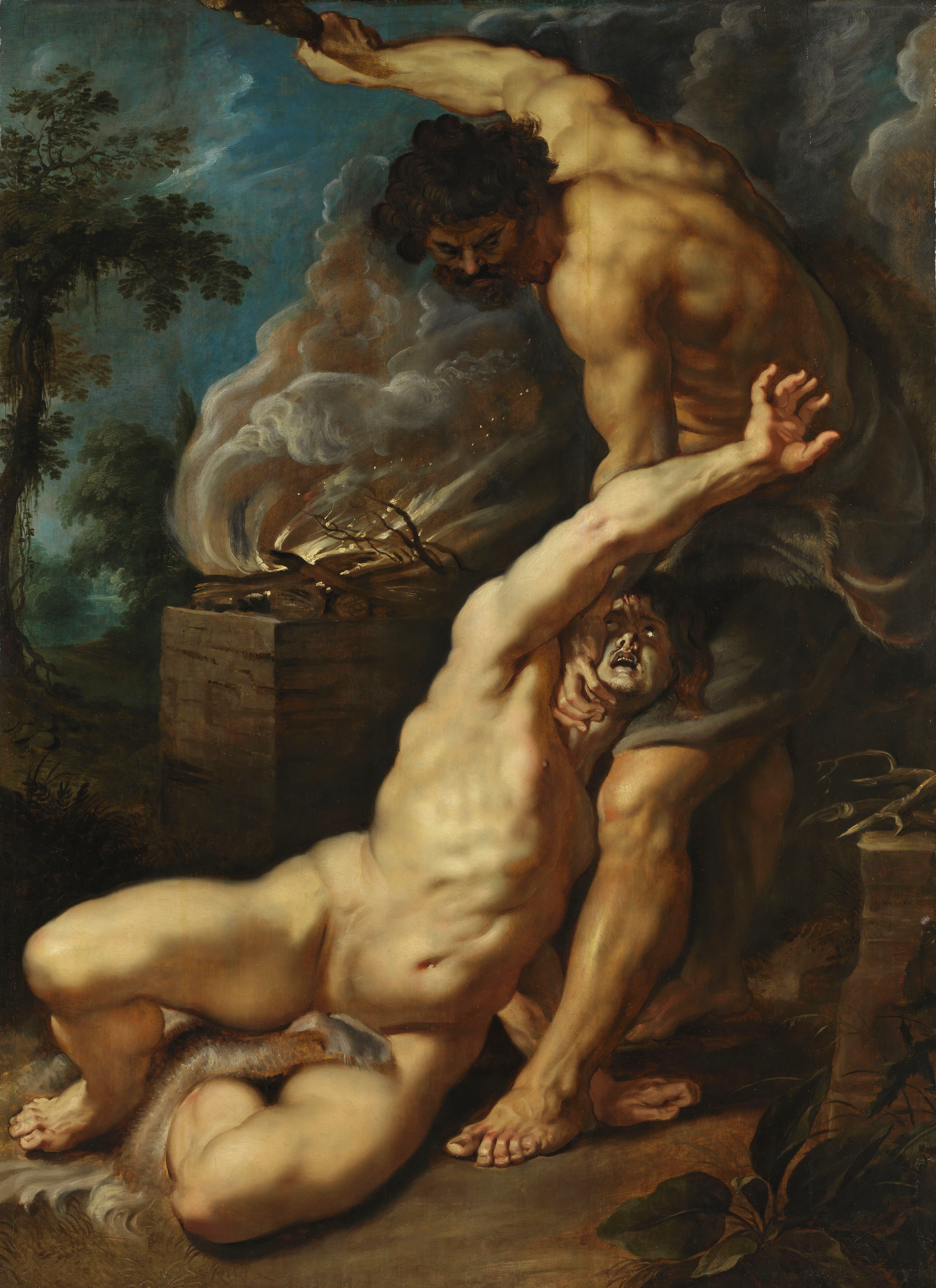
Cain slaying Abel, by Peter Paul Rubens, c. 1600

=== Collective ===
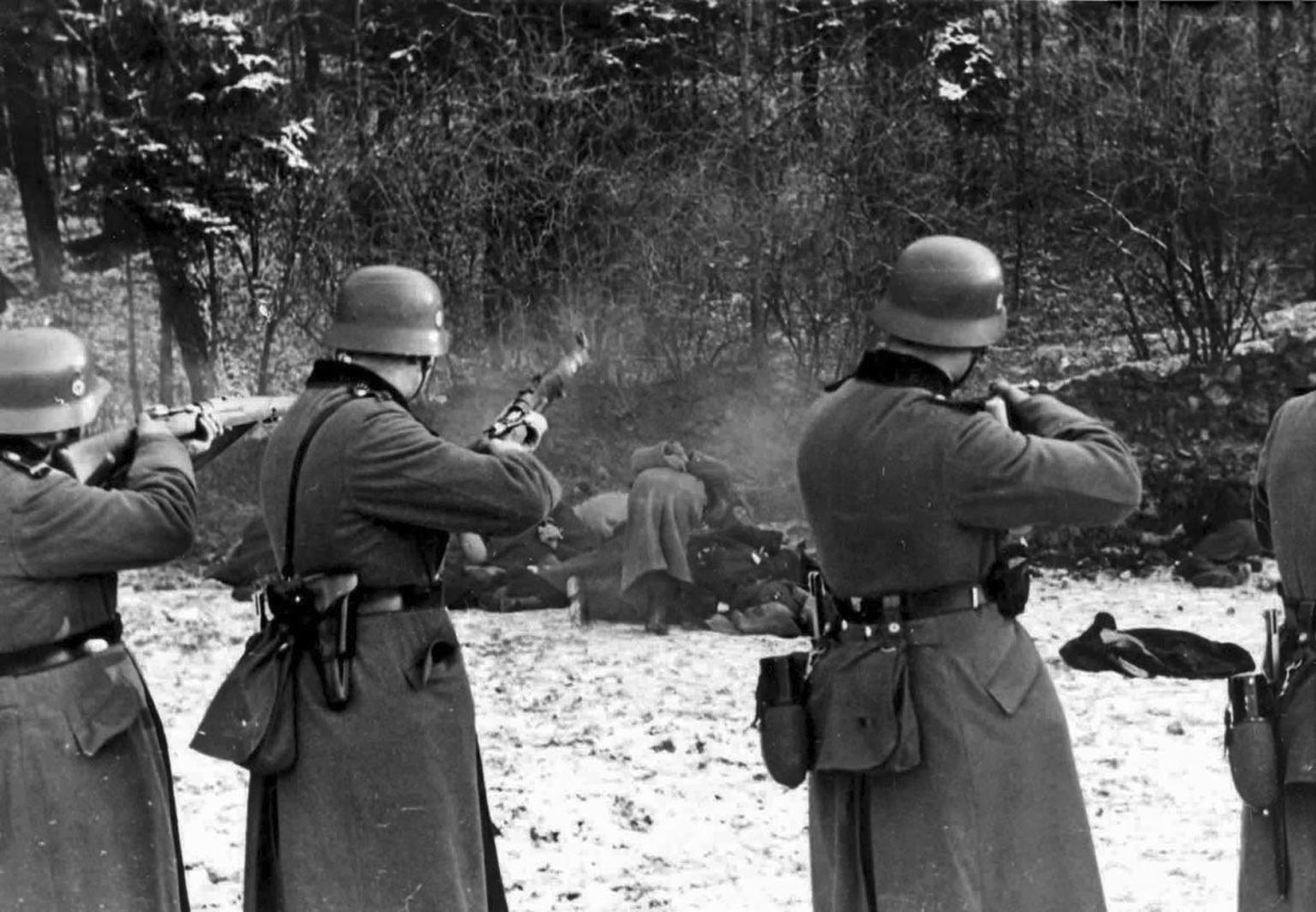
Massacre of Polish civilians during Nazi Germany's occupation of Poland, December 1939

According to WHO, collective violence refers to "the instrumental use of violence by people who identify themselves as members of a group – whether this group is transitory or has a more permanent identity – against another group or set of individuals in order to achieve political, economic or social objectives". Collective violence may be "targeted" or stochastic.

Political violence includes conflicts led by communities, by states, and by other kinds of groups. The most extreme form of collective violence is when conflicts are prolonged, large-scale, and political: war. Explaining wars requires multi-factorial analysis.

Economic violence includes attacks motivated by economic gain—such as attacks carried out with the purpose of disrupting economic activity, denying access to essential services, or creating economic division and fragmentation.

Slow violence is often invisible, gradual, and structural; it obtains through degradation, attrition, and pollution.

Structural violence is a form of violence wherein some social structure or social institution may harm people by preventing them from meeting their basic needs or rights.

=== Interpersonal ===
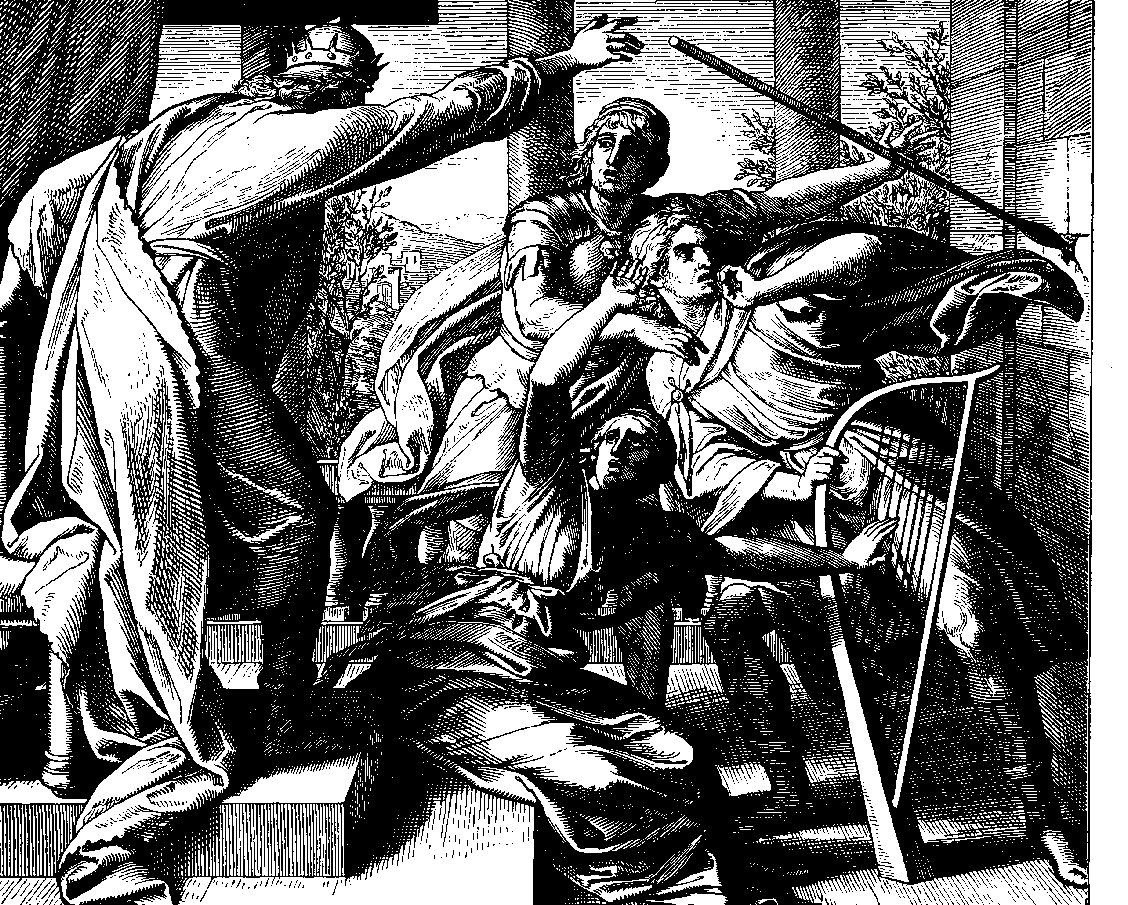
Saul attacks David (who had been playing music to help Saul feel better), 1860 woodcut by Julius Schnorr von Karolsfeld

Interpersonal violence can be subdivided in many ways: types of abuse (physical, emotional, etc.); locations where it occurs (home, work, etc.); age disparity between the persons in the relationship (child, elder). It can affect the victims' other relationships in the short- and long-terms.

==== Location ====
Intimate partner violence (or domestic violence) involves physical, sexual and emotional violence by an intimate partner or ex-partner. Although males can also be victims, intimate partner violence disproportionately affects females. It commonly occurs against girls within child marriages and early/forced marriages. Among romantically involved but unmarried adolescents it is sometimes called "dating violence".

A recent theory named "The Criminal Spin" suggests a mutual flywheel effect between partners that is manifested by an escalation in the violence. A violent spin may occur in any other forms of violence, but in Intimate partner violence the added value is the mutual spin, based on the unique situation and characteristics of intimate relationship.

The primary prevention strategy with the best evidence for effectiveness for intimate partner violence is school-based programming for adolescents to prevent violence within dating relationships. Evidence is emerging for the effectiveness of several other primary prevention strategies—those that: combine microfinance with gender equality training; promote communication and relationship skills within communities; reduce access to, and the harmful use of alcohol; and change cultural gender norms.

==== Age disparity ====
Violence against children includes all forms of violence against people under 18 years old, whether perpetrated by parents or other caregivers, peers, romantic partners, or strangers. Maltreatment (including violent punishment) involves physical, sexual and psychological/emotional violence; and neglect of infants, children and adolescents by parents, caregivers and other authority figures, most often in the home but also in settings such as schools and orphanages. It includes all types of physical and/or emotional ill-treatment, child sexual abuse, neglect, negligence and commercial or other child exploitation, which results in actual or potential harm to the child's health, survival, development or dignity in the context of a relationship of responsibility, trust, or power. Exposure to intimate partner violence is also sometimes included as a form of child maltreatment.

There are no reliable global estimates for the prevalence of child maltreatment. Data for many countries, especially low- and middle-income countries, are lacking. Current estimates vary widely depending on the country and the method of research used. Approximately 20% of women and 5–10% of men report being sexually abused as children, while 25–50% of all children report being physically abused. Exposure to any form of trauma, particularly childhood trauma, can increase the risk of mental illness and suicide; smoking, alcohol and substance abuse; chronic diseases like heart disease, diabetes and cancer; and social problems such as poverty, crime and violence. Child maltreatment is a global problem with serious lifelong consequences. It is complex and difficult to study. Consequences of child maltreatment include impaired lifelong physical and mental health, and social and occupational functioning (e.g. school, job, and relationship difficulties). These can ultimately slow a country's economic and social development. Preventing child maltreatment before it starts is possible and requires a multisectoral approach. Effective prevention programmes support parents and teach positive parenting skills. Ongoing care of children and families can reduce the risk of maltreatment reoccurring and can minimize its consequences.

Elder maltreatment is a single or repeated act, or lack of appropriate action, occurring within any relationship where there is an expectation of trust which causes harm or distress to an older person. While there is little information regarding the extent of maltreatment in elderly populations, especially in developing countries, it is estimated that 4–6% of elderly people in high-income countries have experienced some form of maltreatment at home However, older people are often afraid to report cases of maltreatment to family, friends, or to the authorities. Data on the extent of the problem in institutions such as hospitals, nursing homes and other long-term care facilities are scarce. Elder maltreatment can lead to serious physical injuries and long-term psychological consequences. Elder maltreatment is predicted to increase as many countries are experiencing rapidly ageing populations.

==== Types of abuse ====
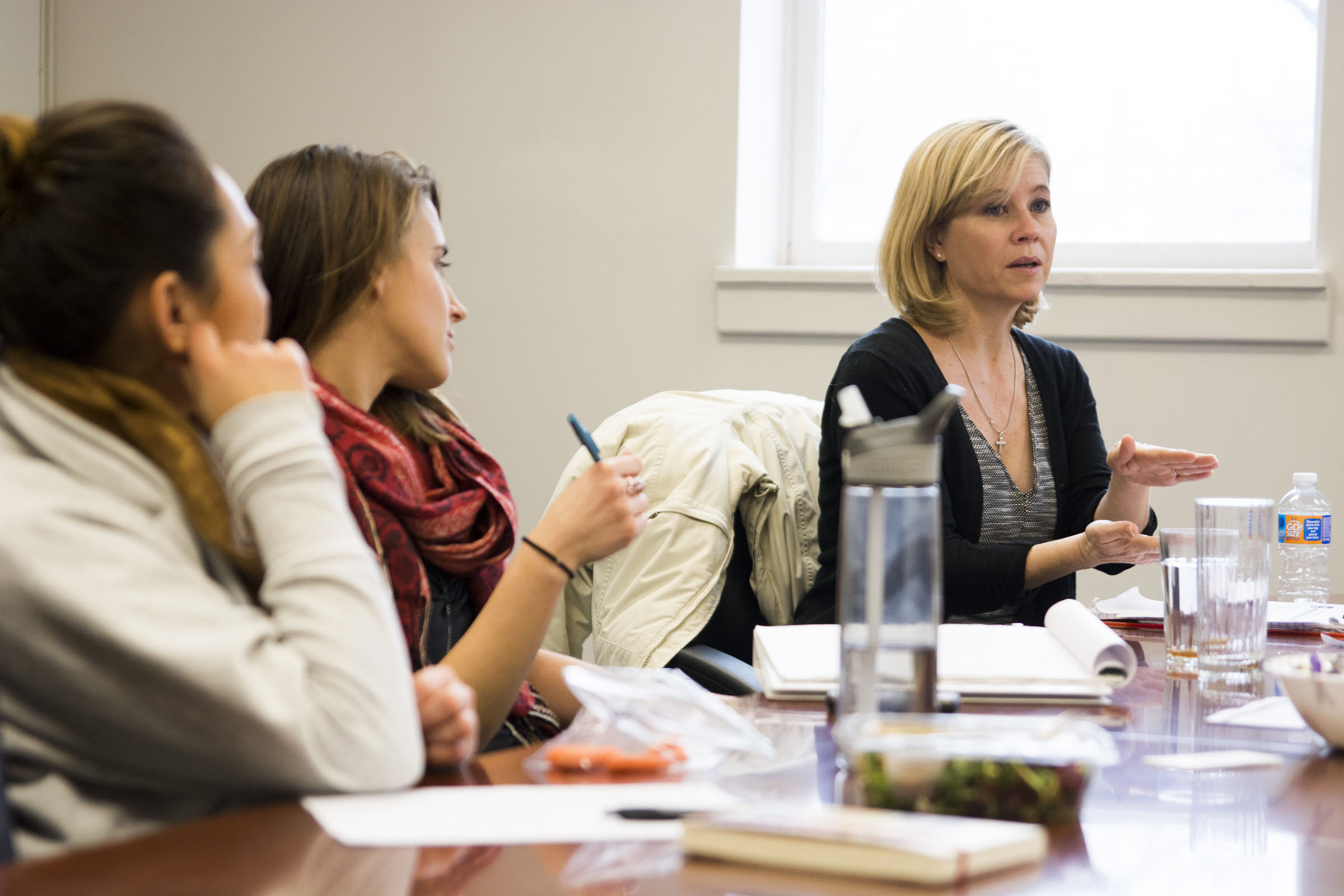
Joint Base Myer-Henderson Hall (JBM-HH) roundtable addressing digital stalking, ties to intimate partner violence

Psychological (or emotional) abuse includes restricting a person's movements, denigration, ridicule, threats and intimidation, discrimination, rejection and other non-physical forms of hostile treatment.

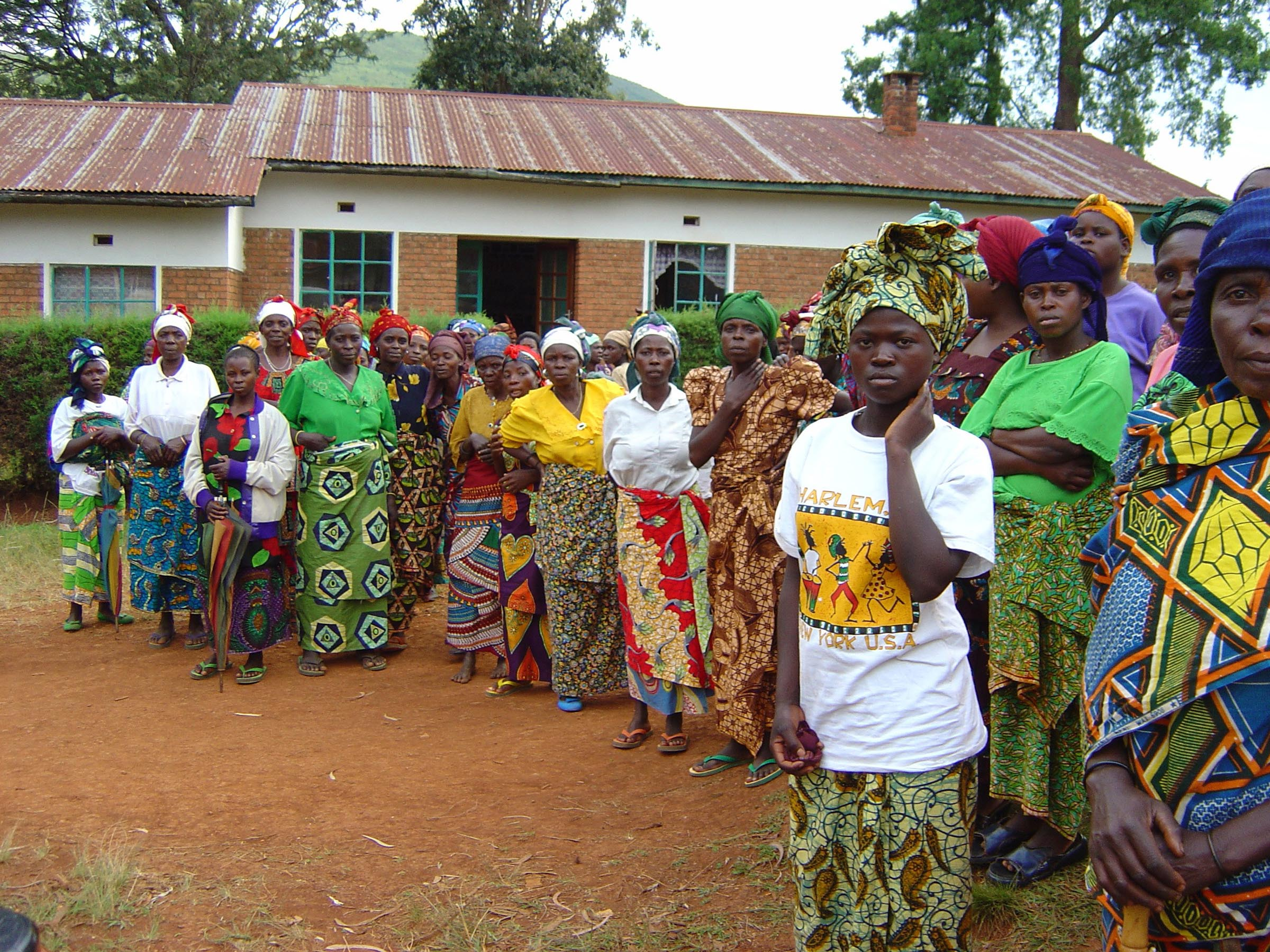
Meeting of victims of sexual violence in the Democratic Republic of the Congo.

Sexual violence is any sexual act, attempt to obtain a sexual act, unwanted sexual comments or advances, or acts to traffic, or otherwise directed against a person's sexuality using coercion, by any person regardless of their relationship to the victim, in any setting. It includes rape, defined as the physically forced or otherwise coerced penetration of the vulva or anus with a penis, other body part or object.

An anthropological concept,"everyday violence" may refer to the incorporation of different forms of violence (mainly political violence) into daily practices.

Sexual violence has serious short- and long-term consequences on physical, mental, sexual and reproductive health for victims and for their children as described in the section on intimate partner violence. If perpetrated during childhood, sexual violence can lead to increased smoking, drug and alcohol misuse, and risky sexual behaviors in later life. It is also associated with perpetration of violence and being a victim of violence.

Many of the risk factors for sexual violence are the same as for domestic violence. Risk factors specific to sexual violence perpetration include beliefs in family honor and sexual purity, ideologies of male sexual entitlement and weak legal sanctions for sexual violence.

Few interventions to prevent sexual violence have been demonstrated to be effective. School-based programmes to prevent child sexual abuse by teaching children to recognize and avoid potentially sexually abusive situations are run in many parts of the world and appear promising, but require further research. To achieve lasting change, many experts maintain that it is important to enact legislation and develop policies that protect women; address discrimination against women and promote gender equality; and help to move the culture away from violence.

== Impact ==
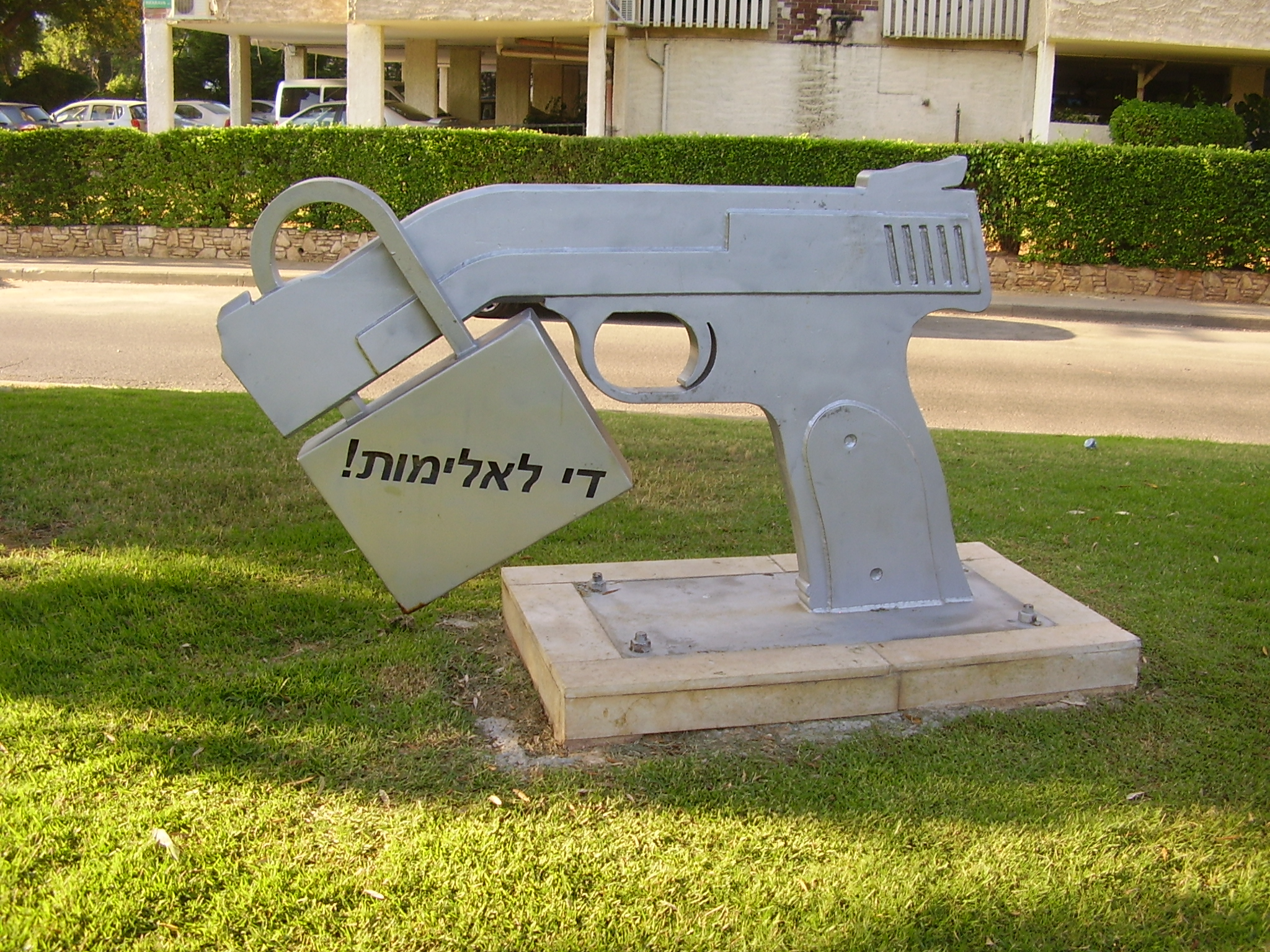
A sculpture in Petah Tikva, Israel of a padlock on the warped barrel of a semi-automatic pistol, with the inscription "stop violence!" in (Hebrew: !די לאלימות)

The Institute for Economics and Peace, estimated that the economic impact of violence and conflict on the global economy, the total economic impact of violence on the world economy in 2024 was estimated to be $17.5 trillion.

The incidence of violence can lead to adverse health effects. Mental health issues include depression, anxiety, posttraumatic stress disorder, and suicide. Physical health issues include cardiovascular diseases and premature mortality. Health effects can be cumulative.

Intimate partner and sexual violence have serious short- and long-term physical, mental, sexual and reproductive health problems for victims and for their children, and lead to high social and economic costs. These include both fatal and non-fatal injuries, depression and post-traumatic stress disorder, unintended pregnancies, sexually transmitted infections, including HIV.

== Prevalence ==
Injuries and violence are a significant cause of death and burden of disease in all countries; however, they are not evenly distributed across or within countries. Violence-related injuries kill 1.25 million people every year, as of 2024. This is relatively similar to 2014 (1.3 million people or 2.5% of global mortality), 2013 (1.28 million people) and 1990 (1.13 million people). For people aged 15–44 years, violence is the fourth leading cause of death worldwide, as of 2014. Between 1990 and 2013, age-standardised death rates fell for self-harm and interpersonal violence. Of the deaths in 2013, roughly 842,000 were attributed to suicide, 405,000 to interpersonal violence, and 31,000 to collective violence and legal intervention. For each single death due to violence, there are dozens of hospitalizations, hundreds of emergency department visits, and thousands of doctors' appointments. Furthermore, violence often has lifelong consequences for physical and mental health and social functioning and can slow economic and social development. It's particularly the case if it happened in childhood.

In 2013, of the estimated 405,000 deaths due to interpersonal violence globally, assault by firearm was the cause in 180,000 deaths, assault by sharp object was the cause in 114,000 deaths, and the remaining 110,000 deaths from other causes.

Estimates of disability-adjusted life years from physical violence, per 100,000 inhabitants in 2002. No data <200 200–400 400–600 600–800 800–1,000 1,000–1,200 1,200–1,400 1,400–1,600 1,600–1,800 1,800–2,000 2,000–3,000 >3,000

Deaths due to interpersonal violence per million persons in 2012 0–8 9–16 17–24 25–32 33–54 55–75 76–96 97–126 127–226 227–878

As of 2010, all forms of violence resulted in about 1.34 million deaths up from about 1 million in 1990. Suicide accounts for about 883,000, interpersonal violence for 456,000 and collective violence for 18,000. Deaths due to collective violence have decreased from 64,000 in 1990.

By way of comparison, the 1.5 millions deaths a year due to violence is greater than the number of deaths due to tuberculosis (1.34 million), road traffic injuries (1.21 million), and malaria (830'000), but slightly less than the number of people who die from HIV/AIDS (1.77 million).

For every death due to violence, there are numerous nonfatal injuries. In 2008, over 16 million cases of non-fatal violence-related injuries were severe enough to require medical attention. Beyond deaths and injuries, forms of violence such as child maltreatment, intimate partner violence, and elder maltreatment have been found to be highly prevalent.

In the last 45 years, suicide rates have increased by 60% worldwide. Suicide is among the three leading causes of death among those aged 15–44 years in some countries, and the second leading cause of death in the 10–24 years age group. These figures do not include suicide attempts which are up to 20 times more frequent than suicide. Suicide was the 16th leading cause of death worldwide in 2004 and is projected to increase to the 12th in 2030. Although suicide rates have traditionally been highest among the male elderly, rates among young people have been increasing to such an extent that they are now the group at highest risk in a third of countries, in both developed and developing countries.

Rates and patterns of violent death vary by country and region. In recent years, homicide rates have been highest in developing countries in Sub-Saharan Africa and Latin America and the Caribbean and lowest in East Asia, the western Pacific, and some countries in northern Africa. Studies show a strong, inverse relationship between homicide rates and both economic development and economic equality. Poorer countries, especially those with large gaps between the rich and the poor, tend to have higher rates of homicide than wealthier countries. Homicide rates differ markedly by age and sex. Gender differences are least marked for children. For the 15 to 29 age group, male rates were nearly six times those for female rates; for the remaining age groups, male rates were from two to four times those for females.

Studies in a number of countries show that, for every homicide among young people age 10 to 24, 20 to 40 other young people receive hospital treatment for a violent injury.

Forms of violence such as child maltreatment and intimate partner violence are highly prevalent. Approximately 20% of women and 5–10% of men report being sexually abused as children, while 25–50% of all children report being physically abused. A WHO multi-country study found that between 15 and 71% of women reported experiencing physical and/or sexual violence by an intimate partner at some point in their lives.

Wars grab headlines, but the individual risk of dying violently in an armed conflict is today relatively low—much lower than the risk of violent death in many countries that are not suffering from an armed conflict. For example, between 1976 and 2008, African Americans were victims of 329,825 homicides. Although there is a widespread perception that war is the most dangerous form of armed violence in the world, the average person living in a conflict-affected country had a risk of dying violently in the conflict of about 2.0 per 100,000 population between 2004 and 2007. This can be compared to the average world homicide rate of 7.6 per 100,000 people. This illustration highlights the value of accounting for all forms of armed violence rather than an exclusive focus on conflict related violence. Certainly, there are huge variations in the risk of dying from armed conflict at the national and subnational level, and the risk of dying violently in a conflict in specific countries remains extremely high. In Iraq, for example, the direct conflict death rate for 2004–07 was 65 per 100,000 people per year and, in Somalia, 24 per 100,000 people. This rate even reached peaks of 91 per 100,000 in Iraq in 2006 and 74 per 100,000 in Somalia in 2007.

Population-level surveys based on reports from victims estimate that between 0.3 and 11.5% of women reported experiencing sexual violence.

== Factors ==
Violence can be attributed to protective and risk factors. The social ecological model divides factors into four levels: individual, relational, communal, and social.

=== Individual ===
Individual risk factors include poor behavioral control, high emotional stress, low IQ, antisocial beliefs or attitudes, and in some cases genetic variation. Individual protective factors include an intolerance towards deviance, higher IQ and GPA, elevated popularity and social skills, as well as religious beliefs. Family protective factors include a connectedness and ability to discuss issues with family members or adults, parent/family use of constructive coping strategies, and consistent parental presence during at least one of the following: when awakening, when arriving home from school, at dinner time, or when going to bed. Social protective factors include quality school relationships, close relationships with non-deviant peers, involvement in prosocial activities, and exposure to school climates that are: well supervised, use clear behavior rules and disciplinary approaches, and engage parents with teachers.

=== Relational ===
Relational risk factors include authoritarian childrearing attitudes, inconsistent disciplinary practices, low emotional attachment to parents or caregivers, and low parental income and involvement. A number of longitudinal studies suggest that the experience of physical punishment has a direct causal effect on later aggressive behaviors. Cross-cultural studies have shown that greater prevalence of corporal punishment of children tends to predict higher levels of violence in societies. For instance, a 2005 analysis of 186 pre-industrial societies found that corporal punishment was more prevalent in societies which also had higher rates of homicide, assault, and war. In the United States, domestic corporal punishment has been linked to later violent acts against family members and spouses. The American family violence researcher Murray A. Straus believes that disciplinary spanking forms "the most prevalent and important form of violence in American families", whose effects contribute to several major societal problems, including later domestic violence and crime.

=== Communal ===
Community risk factors include poverty, low community participation, and diminished economic opportunities. Since violence is a matter of perception as well as a measurable phenomenon, psychologists have found variability in whether people perceive certain physical acts as "violent". For example, in a state where execution is a legalized punishment we do not typically perceive the executioner as "violent", though we may talk, in a more metaphorical way, of the state acting violently. Likewise, understandings of violence are linked to a perceived aggressor-victim relationship: hence psychologists have shown that people may not recognise defensive use of force as violent, even in cases where the amount of force used is significantly greater than in the original aggression. The concept of violence normalization is known as socially sanctioned, or structural violence and is a topic of increasing interest to researchers trying to understand violent behavior, medical anthropology, psychology, psychiatry, philosophy, and bioarchaeology. An environment of great inequalities between people may cause those at the bottom to use more violence in attempts to gain status.

=== Social ===
Social risk factors include social rejection, poor academic performance and commitment to school, and gang involvement or association with delinquent peers. Research into the media and violence examines whether links between consuming media violence and subsequent aggressive and violent behaviour exists. Although some scholars had claimed media violence may increase aggression, this view is coming increasingly in doubt both in the scholarly community and was rejected by the US Supreme Court in the Brown v EMA case, as well as in a review of video game violence by the Australian Government (2010) which concluded evidence for harmful effects were inconclusive at best and the rhetoric of some scholars was not matched by good data.

=== Religious ===
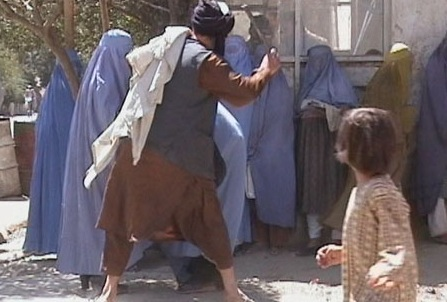
Taliban beating woman in public

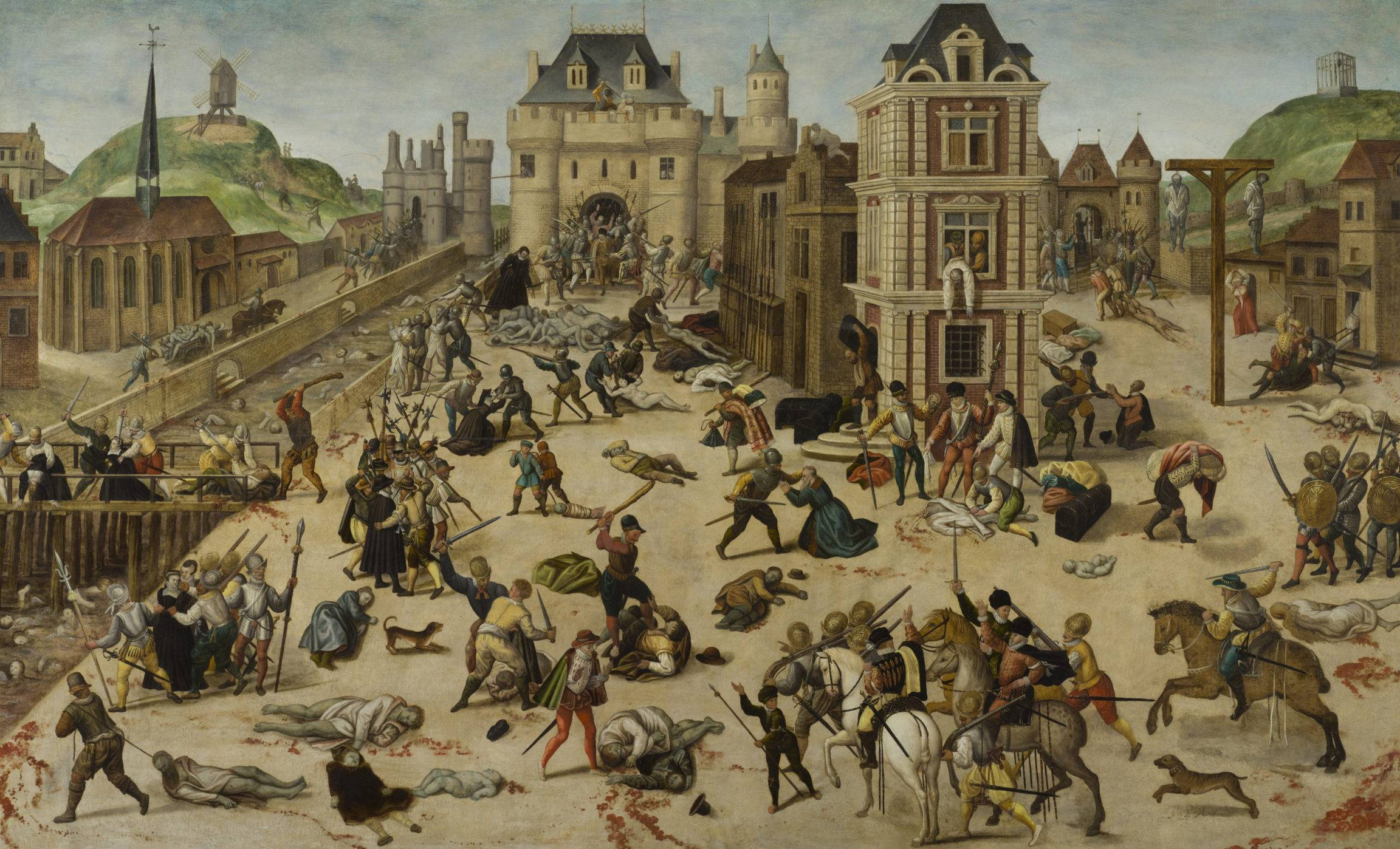
The St. Bartholomew's Day massacre of French Protestants, 1572

Religious violence covers phenomena in which religion is either the target or perpetrator of violent behavior. All the religions of the world contain narratives, symbols, and metaphors of violence and war and also nonviolence and peacemaking. Religious violence is violence that is motivated by, or in reaction to, religious precepts, texts, or the doctrines of a target or an attacker. It includes violence against religious institutions, people, objects, or events. Religious violence includes both acts which are committed by religious groups and acts which are committed against religious groups.

The term “religious violence” has proven difficult to define. Violence is a very broad concept, because it is used against both human and non-human entities. Furthermore, violence can range from bloodshed and physical harm to violation of personal freedoms, passionate conduct or language, or emotional outbursts like fury or passion. Adding to the difficulty, religion is a complex and modern Western concept, one whose definition still has no scholarly consensus.

Religious violence, like all forms of violence, is a cultural process which is context-dependent and highly complex. Thus, oversimplifications of religion and violence often lead to misguided understandings of the causes for acts of violence, as well as oversight of their rarity. Violence is perpetrated for a wide variety of ideological reasons, and religion is generally only one of many contributing social and political factors that may foment it. For example, studies of supposed cases of religious violence often conclude that the violence was driven more by ethnic animosities than by religious worldviews. Historical circumstances in conflicts often are not linear, but socially and politically complex. Due to the complex nature of conflict, it is often difficult to discern whether religion is a significant cause of violence from all other factors. Yet instances of violence unrelated to religion are common in history.

== Prevention ==
Scientific evidence about the effectiveness of interventions to prevent collective violence is lacking. However, policies that facilitate reductions in poverty, that make decision-making more accountable, that reduce inequalities between groups, as well as policies that reduce access to biological, chemical, nuclear and other weapons have been recommended. When planning responses to violent conflicts, recommended approaches include assessing at an early stage who is most vulnerable and what their needs are, co-ordination of activities between various players and working towards global, national and local capabilities so as to deliver effective health services during the various stages of an emergency.

The criminal justice approach sees its main task as enforcing laws that proscribe violence and ensuring that "justice is done". The notions of individual blame, responsibility, guilt, and culpability are central to criminal justice's approach to violence and one of the criminal justice system's main tasks is to "do justice", i.e. to ensure that offenders are properly identified, that the degree of their guilt is as accurately ascertained as possible, and that they are punished appropriately. To prevent and respond to violence, the criminal justice approach relies primarily on deterrence, incarceration and the punishment and rehabilitation of perpetrators.

=== Criminal justice ===
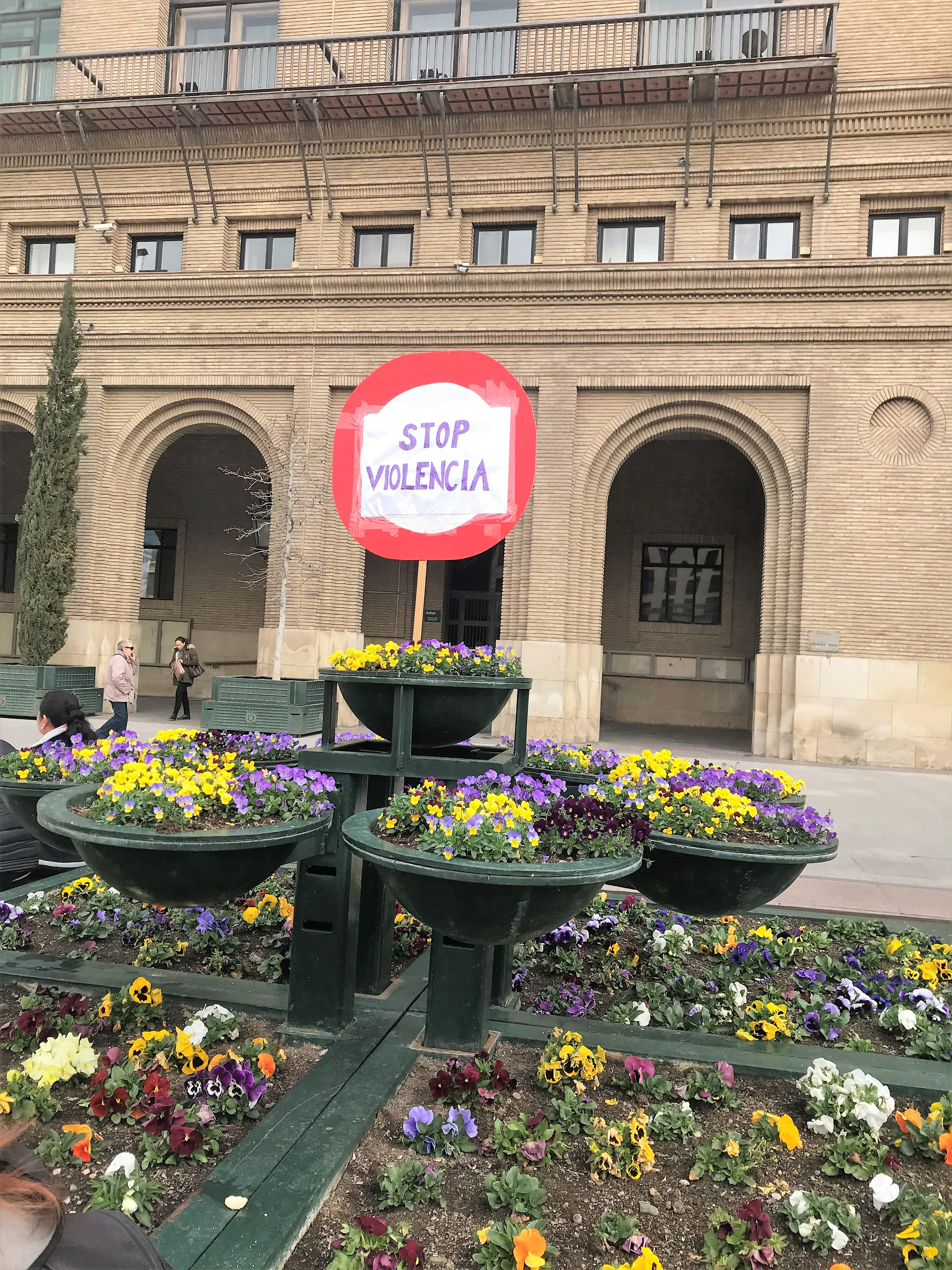
A sign that calls to stop violence

The threat and enforcement of physical punishment has been a tried and tested method of preventing some violence since civilisation began. It is used in various degrees in most countries. The criminal justice approach, beyond justice and punishment, has traditionally emphasized indicated interventions, aimed at those who have already been involved in violence, either as victims or as perpetrators. One of the main reasons offenders are arrested, prosecuted, and convicted is to prevent further crimes—through deterrence (threatening potential offenders with criminal sanctions if they commit crimes), incapacitation (physically preventing offenders from committing further crimes by locking them up) and through rehabilitation (using time spent under state supervision to develop skills or change one's psychological make-up to reduce the likelihood of future offences).

In recent decades in many countries in the world, the criminal justice system has taken an increasing interest in preventing violence before it occurs. For instance, much of community and problem-oriented policing aims to reduce crime and violence by altering the conditions that foster it—and not to increase the number of arrests. Indeed, some police leaders have gone so far as to say the police should primarily be a crime prevention agency. Juvenile justice systems—an important component of criminal justice systems—are largely based on the belief in rehabilitation and prevention. In the US, the criminal justice system has, for instance, funded school- and community-based initiatives to reduce children's access to guns and teach conflict resolution. Despite this, force is used routinely against juveniles by police. In 1974, the US Department of Justice assumed primary responsibility for delinquency prevention programmes and created the Office of Juvenile Justice and Delinquency Prevention, which has supported the "Blueprints for violence prevention" programme at the University of Colorado Boulder.

=== Public health ===
In 1949, Gordon called for injury prevention efforts to be based on the understanding of causes, in a similar way to prevention efforts for communicable and other diseases. In 1962, Gomez, referring to the WHO definition of health, stated that it is obvious that violence does not contribute to "extending life" or to a "complete state of well-being". He defined violence as an issue that public health experts needed to address and stated that it should not be the primary domain of lawyers, military personnel, or politicians. Public health has begun to address violence only 30 years later, and only in the last 15 has it done so at the global level. In 1996, the World Health Assembly adopted Resolution WHA49.25 which declared violence "a leading worldwide public health problem" and requested that the World Health Organization (WHO) initiate public health activities to (1) document and characterize the burden of violence, (2) assess the effectiveness of programmes, with particular attention to women and children and community-based initiatives, and (3) promote activities to tackle the problem at the international and national levels. The World Health Organization's initial response to this resolution was to create the Department of Violence and Injury Prevention and Disability and to publish the World report on violence and health (2002).

The case for the public health sector addressing interpersonal violence rests on four main arguments. First, the significant amount of time health care professionals dedicate to caring for victims and perpetrators of violence has made them familiar with the problem and has led many, particularly in emergency departments, to mobilize to address it. The information, resources, and infrastructures the health care sector has at its disposal are an important asset for research and prevention work. Second, the magnitude of the problem and its potentially severe lifelong consequences and high costs to individuals and wider society call for population-level interventions typical of the public health approach. Third, the criminal justice approach, the other main approach to addressing violence (link to entry above), has traditionally been more geared towards violence that occurs between male youths and adults in the street and other public places—which makes up the bulk of homicides in most countries—than towards violence occurring in private settings such as child maltreatment, intimate partner violence and elder abuse—which makes up the largest share of non-fatal violence. Fourth, evidence is beginning to accumulate that a science-based public health approach is effective at preventing interpersonal violence.

The World Health Organization has identified seven strategies to prevent violence supported by evidence:

1. Developing safe, stable and nurturing relationships between children and their parents and caregivers;
2. Developing life skills in children and adolescents;
3. Reducing the availability and harmful use of alcohol;
4. Reducing access to guns, knives and pesticides;
5. Promoting gender equality to prevent violence against women;
6. Changing cultural and social norms that support violence;
7. Victim identification, care and support programmes.

There is a strong relationship between levels of violence and modifiable factors in a country such as concentrated (regional) poverty, income and gender inequality, the harmful use of alcohol, and the absence of safe, stable, and nurturing relationships between children and parents.

Evaluation studies are beginning to support community interventions that aim to prevent violence against women by promoting gender equality. For instance, evidence suggests that programmes that combine microfinance with gender equity training can reduce intimate partner violence. School-based programmes such as Safe Dates programme in the United States of America and the Youth Relationship Project in Canada have been found to be effective for reducing dating violence.

Rules or expectations of behaviour – norms – within a cultural or social group can encourage violence. Interventions that challenge cultural and social norms supportive of violence can prevent acts of violence and have been widely used, but the evidence base for their effectiveness is currently weak. The effectiveness of interventions addressing dating violence and sexual abuse among teenagers and young adults by challenging social and cultural norms related to gender is supported by some evidence.

Interventions to identify victims of interpersonal violence and provide effective care and support are critical for protecting health and breaking cycles of violence from one generation to the next. Examples for which evidence of effectiveness is emerging includes: screening tools to identify victims of intimate partner violence and refer them to appropriate services; psychosocial interventions—such as trauma-focused cognitive behavioural therapy—to reduce mental health problems associated with violence, including post-traumatic stress disorder; and protection orders, which prohibit a perpetrator from contacting the victim, to reduce repeat victimization among victims of intimate partner violence.

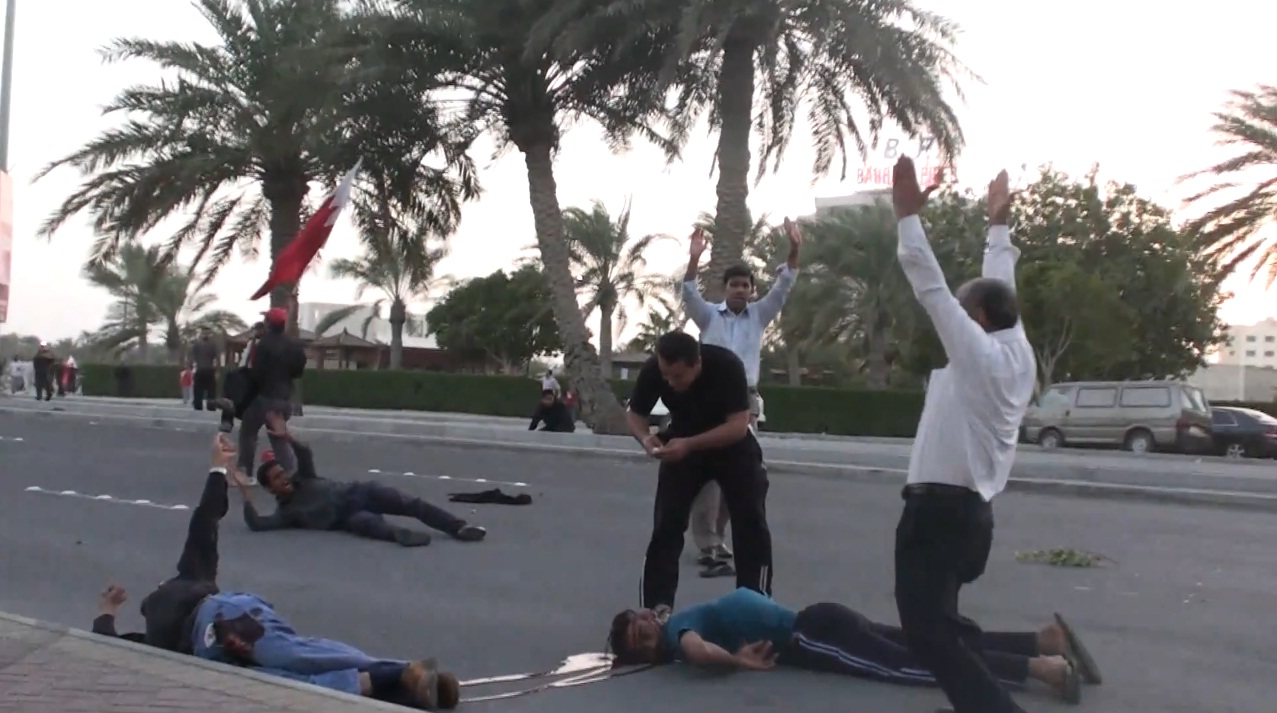
Bahrain's pro-democracy protesters killed by military, February 2011

== Perspectives ==
=== Historical ===
Scientific evidence for warfare has come from settled, sedentary communities. Some studies argue humans have a predisposition for violence (chimpanzees, also great apes, have been known to kill members of competing groups for resources like food). A comparison across mammal species found that humans have a Paleolithic adult homicide rate of about 2%. This would be lower than some other animals, but still high. However, this study took into account the infanticide rate by some other animals such as meerkats, but not of humans, where estimates of children killed by infanticide in the Mesolithic and Neolithic eras vary from 15 to 50 percent. Other evidence suggests that organized, large-scale, militaristic, or regular human-on-human violence was absent for the vast majority of the human timeline, and is first documented to have started only relatively recently in the Holocene, an epoch that began about 11,700 years ago, probably with the advent of higher population densities due to sedentism. Social anthropologist Douglas P. Fry writes that scholars are divided on the origins of possible increase of violence—in other words, war-like behavior:

There are basically two schools of thought on this issue. One holds that warfare... goes back at least to the time of the first thoroughly modern humans and even before then to the primate ancestors of the hominid lineage. The second positions on the origins of warfare sees war as much less common in the cultural and biological evolution of humans. Here, warfare is a latecomer on the cultural horizon, only arising in very specific material circumstances and being quite rare in human history until the development of agriculture in the past 10,000 years.

Jared Diamond in his books Guns, Germs and Steel and The Third Chimpanzee posits that the rise of large-scale warfare is the result of advances in technology and city-states. For instance, the rise of agriculture provided a significant increase in the number of individuals that a region could sustain over hunter-gatherer societies, allowing for development of specialized classes such as soldiers, or weapons manufacturers.

The percentages of men killed in war in eight tribal societies. (Lawrence H. Keeley, Archeologist, War Before Civilization)

In academia, the idea of the peaceful pre-history and non-violent tribal societies gained popularity with the post-colonial perspective. The trend, starting in archaeology and spreading to anthropology reached its height in the late half of the 20th century. However, some newer research in archaeology and bioarchaeology may provide evidence that violence within and among groups is not a recent phenomenon. According to the book "The Bioarchaeology of Violence" violence is a behavior that is found throughout human history.

Lawrence H. Keeley at the University of Illinois writes in War Before Civilization that 87% of tribal societies were at war more than once per year, and that 65% of them were fighting continuously. He writes that the attrition rate of numerous close-quarter clashes, which characterize endemic warfare, produces casualty rates of up to 60%, compared to 1% of the combatants as is typical in modern warfare. "Primitive Warfare" of these small groups or tribes was driven by the basic need for sustenance and violent competition.

Fry explores Keeley's argument in depth and counters that such sources erroneously focus on the ethnography of hunters and gatherers in the present, whose culture and values have been infiltrated externally by modern civilization, rather than the actual archaeological record spanning some two million years of human existence. Fry determines that all present ethnographically studied tribal societies, "by the very fact of having been described and published by anthropologists, have been irrevocably impacted by history and modern colonial nation states" and that "many have been affected by state societies for at least 5000 years."

The relatively peaceful period since World War II is known as the Long Peace.

Steven Pinker's 2011 book, The Better Angels of Our Nature, argued that modern society is less violent than in periods of the past, whether on the short scale of decades or long scale of centuries or millennia. He argues for a paleolithic homicide rate of 15%. Pinker's analyses have also been criticized, concerning the statistical question of how to measure violence and whether it is in fact declining.

Pinker's observation of the decline in interpersonal violence echoes the work of Norbert Elias, who attributes the decline to a "civilizing process", in which the state's monopolization of violence, the maintenance of socioeconomic interdependencies or "figurations", and the maintenance of behavioural codes in culture all contribute to the development of individual sensibilities, which increase the repugnance of individuals towards violent acts. According to a 2010 study, non-lethal violence, such as assaults or bullying appear to be declining as well.

Some scholars disagree with the argument that all violence is decreasing arguing that not all types of violent behaviour are lower now than in the past. They suggest that research typically focuses on lethal violence, often looks at homicide rates of death due to warfare, but ignore the less obvious forms of violence.

=== Philosophical ===
Max Weber stated that the state claims the monopoly of the legitimate use of force to cause harm practised within the confines of a specific territory. Law enforcement is the main means of regulating nonmilitary violence in society. Governments regulate the use of violence through legal systems governing individuals and political authorities, including the police and military. Civil societies authorize some amount of violence, exercised through the police power, to maintain the status quo and enforce laws.

Hannah Arendt noted: "Violence can be justifiable, but it never will be legitimate [...] Its justification loses in plausibility the farther its intended end recedes into the future. No one questions the use of violence in self-defence, because the danger is not only clear but also present, and the end justifying the means is immediate". Arendt made a clear distinction between violence and power. Most political theorists regarded violence as an extreme manifestation of power whereas Arendt regarded the two concepts as opposites. Some philosophers have argued that any interpretation of reality is intrinsically violent. Slavoj Žižek, in his book Violence, stated that "something violent is the very symbolization of a thing." Johanna Oskala argues that while "the ontological violence of language does, in significant ways, sustain, enable, and encourage physical violence, it is a serious mistake to conflate them [...] Violence is understood to be ineliminable in the first sense, and this leads to its being treated as a fundamental in the second sense, too." Both Foucault and Arendt considered the relationship between power and violence but concluded that while related they are distinct.

In feminist philosophy, epistemic violence is the act of causing harm by an inability to understand the conversation of others due to ignorance. Some philosophers think this will harm marginalized groups.

Brad Evans states that violence "represents a violation in the very conditions constituting what it means to be human as such", "is always an attack upon a person's dignity, their sense of selfhood, and their future", and "is both an ontological crime ... and a form of political ruination".

Robert L. Holmes argues that however elusive its general definition may be, violence entails a moral wrong, insofar as "it is presumptively wrong to do violence to innocent persons." He further argues that at least one necessary condition for the formulation of any potential moral alternative to violence in all its manifistations is the exploration of a philosophy of nonviolence which places a concern for the lives and the well-being of individual persons at its moral center.

== See also ==
- Ahimsa
- Culture of violence theory
- De-escalation
- Deradicalization
- Fight-or-flight response
- Harm principle
- Hunting
- Legislative violence
- Non Violent Resistance (psychological intervention)
- Road rage
- Violence begets violence
- Violence in art
- Chimpanzee violence

== Sources ==
- Barzilai, Gad (2003). Communities and Law: Politics and Cultures of Legal Identities. Ann Arbor: University of Michigan Press. ISBN 0-472-11315-1.
- Benjamin, Walter, Critique of Violence
- Flannery, D.J., Vazsonyi, A.T. & Waldman, I.D. (Eds.) (2007). The Cambridge handbook of violent behavior and aggression. Cambridge University Press. ISBN 0-521-60785-X.
- James, Paul; Sharma, RR (2006). Globalization and Violence, Vol. 4: Transnational Conflict. London: Sage Publications.
- Malešević, Siniša The Sociology of War and Violence. Cambridge University Press; 2010 [cited October 17, 2011]. ISBN 978-0-521-73169-0.
- Nazaretyan, A.P. (2007). Violence and Non-Violence at Different Stages of World History: A view from the hypothesis of techno-humanitarian balance. In: History & Mathematics. Moscow: KomKniga/URSS. pp. 127–48. ISBN 978-5-484-01001-1.
- States, United (1918). "U.S. Compiled Statutes, 1918: Embracing the Statutes of the United States of a General and Permanent Nature in Force July 16, 1918, with an Appendix Covering Acts June 14 to July 16, 1918". Making of Modern Law: Primary Sources, 1763–1970: 1716.
