= Statistics of Deadly Quarrels =

1960 book by Lewis Fry Richardson

- Title page for Statistics of Deadly Quarrels (1960)
- Author: Lewis Fry Richardson
- Language: English
- Subject: War
- Publisher: Boxwood Press
- Publication date: 1960
- Media type: Print
- Pages: 373
- OCLC: 606099616

Statistics of Deadly Quarrels is a 1960 book by English mathematician and physicist Lewis Fry Richardson (1881–1953) published posthumously by Boxwood Press. The book is a mathematical and social science study on the origins of war; topics that informed much of Richardson's research throughout his life.

The book received mixed reviews in academia, with overall critical consensus that the works therein are important pioneering endeavors.

== Background ==
The book can be seen as a follow-up to Richardson's book Arms and Insecurity (1949) with a number of reviewers commenting on both books, treating them as a related set. It was published posthumously, based on published and unpublished works of Richardson, and was edited by American political scientists Quincy Wright and C. C. Lienau.

== Contents ==
In Statistics of Deadly Quarrels Richardson presented data on most conflicts, in particular, wars, from AD 1820 to 1949. He hypothesized a base 10 logarithmic scale for conflicts (not just wars but at the bottom of the scale, even simple homicides). He illustrated the fact that there are many more small fights, in which only a few people die, than large ones that kill many. While no conflict's size can be predicted beforehand and it is impossible to give an upper limit to the series, overall they do form a Poisson distribution.

Richardson also attempted to correlate factors such as economics, language, and religion with the causes of war. Most proved insignificant, except religion; data indicated that countries with differing religions are more likely to engage in hostilities. Some of his findings suggested that Christian nations participated in an above-average number of hostilities, particularly against Islamic nations; and that Spanish speakers tended to war against one another more than other language speakers, while Chinese speakers fought against one another less than expected. (Here Richardson criticizes individualism and praises collectivism.) There are also suggestions that countries under similar governments are less likely to fight one another (see also democratic peace theory), and that fighting is "infectious". The neighbors of belligerent countries are likely to be involved.

Nationalism is shown to reduce the chances of civil wars while increasing the chances of international warfare. The question whether world government might pacify the world the author leaves undefined: "There are arguments both ways." Revolts and civil wars remain possible. National propaganda pacifies the nation by directing the hates of the population outwards but the world state, being world-wide, cannot be pacified in this manner.

Economic factors explained only 10 percent of the causes, which contradicts the expectations from the Marxist theory, although this interpretation has been subject to criticism, as one of the reviewers noted that arguably Richardson's data can be taken to show that economic factors contributed to two-thirds of the causes.

Richardson's data also suggested that the larger the war, the more exponentially deadly it would be; an observation which has been considered a warning against World War III.

== Reception ==
The book received mixed reviews in academia, with many reviewers noting that Richardson's book, or books, can be debated and criticized, but are arguably an important pioneering endeavor. David Gold reviewing the book for the American Sociological Review in 1962 concluded that "one cannot help but be impressed by [Richardson's] bold imagination. The heuristic value of this work can prove to be great. Nevertheless, this work is science in the most superficial state."

Among the more positive takes, writing for Science in 1960, Paul Kecskemeti called it "monumental" and "an important landmark" in the quest to develop mathematical models encompassing complex social situations. Sociologist Philip C. Sagi in his 1961 review of the book for the Annals of the American Academy of Political and Social Science called it a valuable addition to the sociology of conflict. The same year, an anonymous reviewer for the Journal of the American Statistical Association noted that the volumes "establish Richardson as an important precursor.... in the mathematical analysis of conflict". A year later, Ian Sutherland in the Journal of the Royal Statistical Society praised the book as a "remarkable pioneering achievement in a field which many would have regarded as not amenable to mathematical treatment" and "a comprehensive and highly ingenious descriptive analysis of past wars".

On the other hand, in 1962, American sociologist Amitai Etzioni in the American Journal of Sociology was rather critical of the work, calling it a "poor" use of mathematical models in sociology.

== See also ==
- The Better Angels of Our Nature
- War Before Civilization
