= Lawrence H. Keeley =

American archaeologist (1948–2017)

- Born: August 24, 1948; Cupertino, California, US
- Died: October 11, 2017 (aged 69)
- Occupation: archaeologist
- Awards: Society for American Archaeology's Award for Excellence in Lithic Studies

Academic background
- Education: San Jose State University (B.A., 1970); University of Oregon (M.A., 1972); Oxford University (Ph.D., 1977)
- Thesis: An experimental study of Microwear traces on selected British Palaeolithic implements (1977)

Academic work
- Discipline: Archaeology
- Sub-discipline: Prehistoric archaeology Experimental archaeology Lithics
- Institutions: University of Illinois Chicago

Lawrence H. Keeley (August 24, 1948 – October 11, 2017) was an American archaeologist best known for pioneering the field of microwear analysis of lithics. He is also known for his 1996 book, War Before Civilization: The Myth of the Peaceful Savage. Keeley worked as a professor of archaeology at the University of Illinois Chicago.

== Early life ==
Keeley was born and raised in Cupertino, California, where he attended Cupertino High School. After high school, he went on to earn his B.A. in Anthropology from San José State University in 1970. Keeley initially pursued graduate education at the University of Oregon, but his professors encouraged him to enroll in a British university. After transferring, Keeley earned his Ph.D. in Archaeology at the University of Oxford in 1977.

== Career ==
Keeley had a short postdoctoral appointment at Musée royal de l'Afrique centrale in 1977. He began his academic career at the University of Illinois Chicago the following year. Keeley was promoted to assistant professor in 1984, and reached full professor in 1991. He retained this position until his 2014 retirement.

=== Microwear Analysis ===
With the use of high magnification ... one can almost always isolate the used portion of the tool and reconstruct its movement during use, as well as, in the majority of cases, determine exactly which material was being worked.

— Lawrence H. Keeley, Experimental Determination of Stone Tool Uses: A Microwear Analysis (1980), p.78.

Keeley's most noted contribution to the fields of Paleolithic archaeology and experimental archaeology was his development and defense of microwear analysis in the study of stone tools and hominid behavioral reconstruction. Microwear analysis is one of two primary methods (the other being use-wear analysis) for identifying the functions of artifact tools. Both methods rely on examination of the smoothed down sections of blades, called "polishes," formed on the working edges of lithics. Microwear differs from use-wear because of the scale at which the analysis happens; microwear analysis is the use of microscopy to evaluate and understand these polishes. Keeley is considered to be a pioneer of microwear analysis, and microwear analysis has become a vital method of archaeological research.

The primary way that Keeley demonstrated the efficacy of microwear analysis was through the Keeley–Newcomer blind test. The methodology of this test was similar to other early microwear experiments, and it consisted of attempting to correctly determine tool function from analysis of lithics made and used by a researcher. The Keeley-Newcomer test differed from prior tests though because the tools were made and used by a researcher, Mark Newcomer, independent of the archaeologist, Lawrence Keeley. Keeley took up this test as a challenge from Mark Newcomer, a lecturer at London University's Institute of Archaeology and a skeptic of microwear analysis, to demonstrate the reliability of the method. Running a blind test granted their results objectivity and turned the experiment into an argument for the general use of microwear analysis in archaeological research. As a result of these original results and similar tests, microwear has enjoyed consistent use and development across the field of Paleolithic archaeology since 1977.

Despite Keeley's successful identification of the majority of the lithics provided by Newcomer and subsequent similar blind tests by other archaeologists, Newcomer wrote critically of microwear analysis in 1986. He wrote of a series of blind tests run by London University, "there has been no convincing demonstration that anyone can consistently identify worked materials by polish type alone." However, other archaeologists have defended Keeley's contribution and even criticized Newcomer's skepticism.

=== Koobi Fora study ===
Keeley worked with Nicholas Toth in 1981 to analyze oldowan tools from Koobi Fora, Kenya. Using microwear and use-wear analysis, the pair narrowed their research to 54 lithic flakes from among the oldowan, which they used to understand the at least 1.4 million year-old civilization. Nine of these 54 exhibited signs of wear in their analysis, which involved high power microscopy at 50-400x magnification. Keeley discovered that these nine flakes, which would have been overlooked by most traditional studies, were actually used as stone tools themselves and were not simply debitage from the creation of lithic cores. Their conclusion was that flakes themselves were the desired tool in lithic reduction, which was supported by their identification of flakes used for butchery, woodworking, and standard cutting of plant matter. At the time of publishing, this use theory ran counter to a competing theory that lithic cores were the primary intended tools. Since publishing, however, their theories have become widely known and have found support in several other studies. Their joint study was published in Nature and has been widely cited as an example of hominid behavioral reconstruction.

Toth later hypothesized that these flake tools were likely to have initially been created accidentally from the creation of cores but later became the desired result instead of cores. He also stated that the development of flake tools was crucial in the evolution of human intelligence, a theory that has found support even outside of archaeology.

=== War Before Civilization ===
According to War before Civilization, modern western societies are significantly less violent than various historical groups.

Keeley's best known work is War Before Civilization: The Myth of the Peaceful Savage, published by the Oxford University Press in 1996. This book was an empirical rebuttal of the popular romantic anthropological idea of the "noble savage." Keeley's core thesis is that western academics had "pacified" history, especially relating to the role of violence in the history of human development, and that overall death rates in modern societies were remarkably lower than among small-scale Paleolithic groups. War Before Civilization reinvigorated classic arguments regarding human nature, largely inspired by Thomas Hobbes and Jean-Jacques Rousseau's perspectives on the subject. This book also initiated a renewed interdisciplinary interest in war in the context of sociocultural evolution, which lasted through the latter 1990s.

The findings of this book have been the subject of some criticism, including a short 2014 article reprinted by Indian Country Today. Keith F. Otterbein, an anthropology professor, criticized Keeley's book in American Anthropologist, explaining that Keeley was right to identify two competing theories on human nature, but that he did not capture the full scope of historical developments by disregarding the idea of peaceful prehistoric hominids. Neil L. Whitehead, another notable anthropologist and someone identified by Keeley as a proponent of the myth of the peaceful savage, sympathized with Otterbein but saw other ways to challenge Keeley's "peculiar view" of anthropology.

== Books ==
- Experimental Determination of Stone Tool Uses: A Microwear Analysis (University of Chicago Press, 1980); ISBN 978-0226428895
- War Before Civilization: The Myth of the Peaceful Savage (Oxford University Press, 1996); ISBN 978-0195091120
