= War Before Civilization =

1996 book by Lawrence H. Keeley

- Author: Lawrence H. Keeley
- Language: English
- Subject: Warfare
- Publisher: Oxford University Press
- Publication date: 1996
- Media type: Print
- Pages: xiv, 245
- ISBN: 9780199761531
- OCLC: 770942100

War Before Civilization: the Myth of the Peaceful Savage (Oxford University Press, 1996) is a book by Lawrence H. Keeley, a professor of archaeology at the University of Illinois at Chicago who specialized in prehistoric Europe. The book deals with warfare conducted throughout human history by societies with little technology. In the book, Keeley aims to stop the apparent trend in seeing modern civilization as bad, by setting out to prove that prehistoric societies were often violent and engaged in frequent warfare that was highly destructive to the cultures involved.

== Summary ==
According to Keeley's book, modern western societies are not more violent or war-prone than (historical) tribes. This bar chart compares the percentage of male deaths as caused by warfare in eight tribal societies (Jívaro, Yanomamo, Mae Enga, Dugum Dani, Murngin, Huli, Gebusi) with Europe and the US in the 20th century. The chart is based on War before Civilization.

Keeley conducts an investigation of the archaeological evidence for prehistoric violence, including murder and massacre as well as war. He also looks at nonstate societies of more recent times – where we can name the tribes and peoples – and their propensity for warfare. It has long been known, for example, that many tribes of South America's tropical forest engaged in frequent warfare.

Keeley says peaceful societies are an exception. About 90–95% of known societies engage in war. Those that did not are almost universally either isolated nomadic groups (for whom flight is an option), groups of defeated refugees, or small enclaves under the protection of a larger modern state. The attrition rate of numerous close-quarter clashes, which characterize warfare in tribal warrior society, produces casualty rates of up to 60%, compared to 1% of the combatants as is typical in modern warfare. Despite the undeniable carnage and effectiveness of modern warfare, the evidence shows that tribal warfare is on average 20 times more deadly than 20th-century warfare, whether calculated as a percentage of total deaths due to war or as average deaths per year from war as a percentage of the total population. Nicholas Wade writes: "Had the same casualty rate been suffered by the population of the twentieth century, its war deaths would have totaled two billion people." In modern tribal societies, death rates from war are four to six times the highest death rates in 20th-century Germany or Russia.

One-half of the people found in a Mesolithic cemetery in present-day Jebel Sahaba, Sudan dating to as early as 13,000 years ago had died as a result of warfare between seemingly different racial groups with victims bearing marks of being killed by arrow heads, spears and club, prompting some to call it the first race war. The Yellowknives tribe in Canada was effectively obliterated by massacres committed by Dogrib Indians, and disappeared from history shortly thereafter. Similar massacres occurred among the Eskimos, the Crow Indians, and countless others. These mass killings occurred well before any contact with the West. In Arnhem Land in northern Australia, a study of warfare among the Australian Aboriginal Murngin people in the late-19th century found that over a 20-year period no less than 200 out of 800 men, or 25% of all adult males, had been killed in intertribal warfare. The accounts of missionaries to the area in the borderlands between Brazil and Venezuela have recounted constant infighting in the Yanomami tribes for women or prestige, and evidence of continuous warfare for the enslavement of neighboring tribes such as the Macu before the arrival of European settlers and government. More than a third of the Yanomamo males, on average, died from warfare.

According to Keeley, among the indigenous peoples of the Americas, only 13% did not engage in wars with their neighbors at least once per year. The natives' pre-Columbian ancient practice of using human scalps as trophies is well documented. Iroquois routinely slowly tortured to death captured enemy warriors (see Captives in American Indian Wars for details). In some regions of the American Southwest, the violent destruction of prehistoric settlements is well documented and during some periods was even common. For example, the large pueblo at Sand Canyon in Colorado, although protected by a defensive wall, was almost entirely burned, artifacts in the rooms had been deliberately smashed, and bodies of some victims were left lying on the floors. After this catastrophe in the late thirteenth century, the pueblo was never reoccupied.

For example, at the Crow Creek massacre site (in the territory of the Crow Creek Reservation in South Dakota), archaeologists found a mass grave containing the remains of more than 500 men, women, and children who had been slaughtered, scalped, and mutilated during an attack on their village a century and a half before Columbus's arrival (c. 1325 AD). The Crow Creek massacre seems to have occurred just when the village's fortifications were being rebuilt. All the houses were burned, and most of the inhabitants were murdered. This death toll represented more than 60% of the village's population, estimated from the number of houses to have been about 800. The survivors appear to have been primarily young women, as their skeletons are underrepresented among the bones; if so, they were probably taken away as captives. Certainly, the site was deserted for some time after the attack because the bodies evidently remained exposed to scavenging animals for a few weeks before burial. In other words, this whole village was annihilated in a single attack and never reoccupied.

Chapter 5 compares civilized soldiers with primitive warriors. Keeley observes that tactical methods by civilized soldiers were not very good and that primitive methods were actually better. Indigenous groups in many areas of the world successfully defended and defeated multiple European colonization campaigns for decades due to primitive unorthodox warfare techniques like smaller mobile units, using small arms as opposed to artillery, open formations, frequent uses of ambushes and raids, surprise attacks, destruction of infrastructure (e.g. villages, habitations, foodstores, livestock, means of transportation), extensive uses of scouts. European conquests were greatly helped by ecological changes like diseases, viruses, and bacteria in defeating many indigenous groups since such conditions eliminated more indigenous people than did any armed conflict. The defeat of the Inca and the Aztecs are examples. Sometimes, primitive groups had better military foresight than civilized counterparts. Keeley relates an incident in which an Eipo tribal leader of highland Irian (in Western New Guinea) quickly thought of – and wanted to immediately use – aerial bombardment of enemies shortly after seeing an airplane for the first time. Keeley says the Western developers of planes took years to develop similar ideas. Many primitive techniques are preserved in modern times as guerrilla warfare.

He makes three conclusions which The New York Times considers unexpected:

- that the most important part of any society, even the most war-like ones, are the peaceful aspects such as art
- that neither frequency nor intensity of war is correlated with population density
- that societies frequently trading with one another fight more wars with one another

== Reception ==
When it was published, I thought my book would annoy everybody. Other than a few anthropologists whom I either ridiculed or found rather obvious mistakes in their analyses, the reception was instead surprisingly positive. This positive response was especially true of archaeologists.

— Keeley, L. H. (2014). War Before Civilization – 15 Years On. In The Evolution of Violence (pp. 23–31). Springer, New York

The New York Times said that "the book's most dramatic payoff is its concluding explanation for the recent "pacification of the past" by scholars" and that "...revulsion with the excesses of World War II has led to a loss of faith in progress and Western civilization....".

American political scientist Eliot A. Cohen described the book as "At once scholarly and lucid, he paints a dark picture of human nature, although he does not believe humankind is doomed to a perpetual striving for mutual extinction. A sobering, grim, and important book." Anthropologist R. Brian Ferguson gave a critical review and argued that Keeley overstated the commonality of ancient warfare and that aversion by academics to the existence of pre-historical warfare was misrepresented.

The book was a finalist for the 1996 Los Angeles Times Book Prize for History.

=== Selected academic reviews ===
- Bryjak, George J. (July 1997). "Book Review: War Before Civilization: The Myth of the Peaceful Savage". Armed Forces & Society. 23 (4): 675–677. doi:10.1177/0095327X9702300409. S2CID 144659141.
- Helms, Mary W. (1999). "Review of War before Civilization: The Myth of the Peaceful Savage; Blood Rites: Origins and History of the Passions of War". Journal of World History. 10 (2): 431–434. doi:10.1353/jwh.1999.0011. JSTOR 20078787. S2CID 162372565.
- Franson, Robert Wilfred (July 2004). "Review: War Before Civilization - Lawrence H. Keeley". Troynovant. Franson Publications.
- Meilinger, Phillip S.; Wrangham, Richard; Peterson, Dale; Keeley, Lawrence H.; Keegan, John (July 1997). "Demonic Males: Apes and the Origins of Human Violence". The Journal of Military History. 61 (3): 598. doi:10.2307/2954037. JSTOR 2954037. S2CID 16972227. ProQuest 1296716952.
- Simons, Anna (February 1997). "Two Perspectives on War and Its Beginnings War Before Civilization: The Myth of the Peaceful Savage. Lawrence Keeley Ride of the Second Horseman: The Birth and Death of War. Robert L. O'Connell". Current Anthropology. 38 (1): 149–151. doi:10.1086/204602. S2CID 146215718.
- Straus, Lawrence G. (December 1997). "War before Civilization: The Myth of the Peaceful Savage . Lawrence H. Keeley". Journal of Anthropological Research. 53 (4): 505–507. doi:10.1086/jar.53.4.3631266.
- Willis, Roy (February 1999). "War before civilization. The myth of the peaceful savage. BY LAWRENCE H. KEELEY. New York and Oxford: Oxford University Press. 1996. xii + 245 pp. Hb.: $25. ISBN 0 19 509112 4". Social Anthropology. 7 (1) S0964028299280081: 93–113. doi:10.1017/S0964028299280081.

== See also ==
- Constant Battles: Why we fight by Steven A. LeBlanc and Katherine E. Register (2004)
- The Better Angels of Our Nature by Steven Pinker (2011)
- Statistics of Deadly Quarrels by Lewis F. Richardson (1960)
- Douglas P. Fry, author of The Human Potential for Peace: An Anthropological Challenge to Assumptions about War and Violence (2006) and Beyond War: The Human Potential for Peace (2007)
