= Douglas P. Fry =

American anthropologist (born 1953)

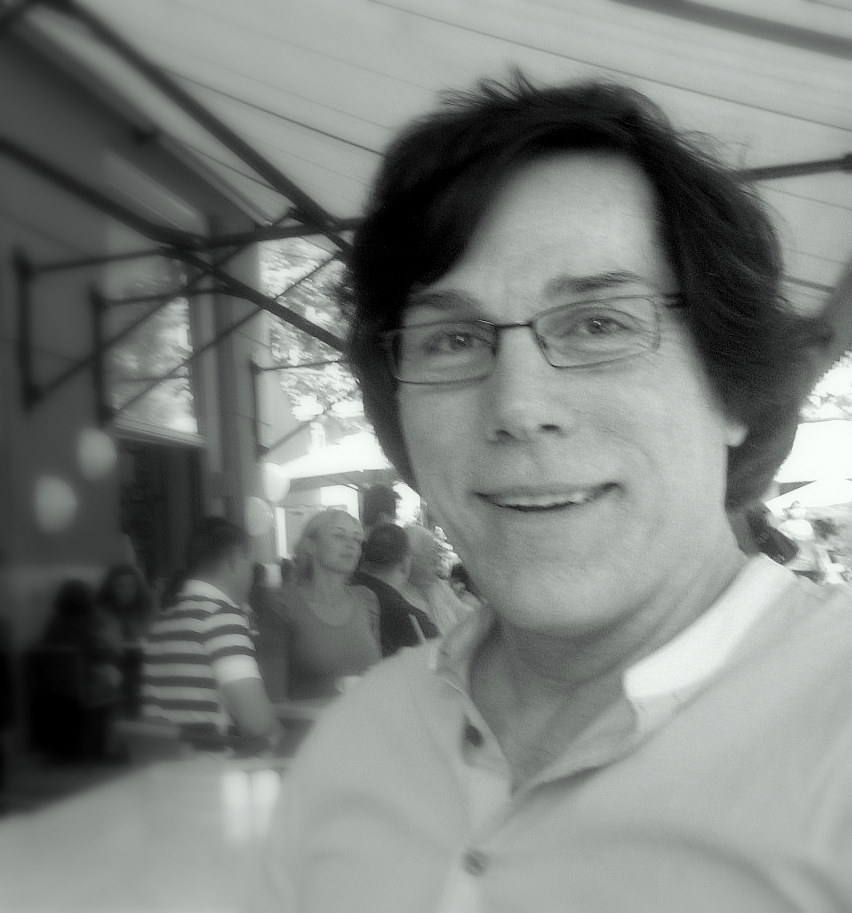
Douglas P. Fry

Douglas P. Fry (born 20 September 1953 in Boston, Massachusetts) is an American anthropologist. He has written extensively on aggression, conflict, and conflict resolution in his own books and in journals such as Science and American Anthropologist. His work frequently engages the debate surrounding the origins of war, arguing against claims that war or lethal aggression is rooted in human evolution.

Fry currently chairs the Department of Anthropology at the University of Alabama at Birmingham and is an affiliate of Åbo Akademi University in Vaasa, Finland.

"Today, the idea of the European nations waging war with each other is absurd", Fry said in 2021.

== Publications ==
=== Books ===
- Fry, Douglas P. (Ed). (2013). War, Peace, and Human Nature: The Convergence of Evolutionary and Cultural Views. New York: Oxford University Press.
- Kurtz, Lester (Editor-in-Chief) (2008)., A. McAlister, A. Petit, A. Coker, B. Chasin, D. Ritter, D. Fry, J. Oberg, J. Backwell, L. Lorentzen, M. Okamoto, & R. Elias (Associate Eds.): Encyclopedia of Violence, Peace, and Conflict, Volumes 1–3, second edition. New York: Elsevier/Academic Press. ISBN 0-12-369503-1
- Fry, Douglas P. (2007). Beyond War: The Human Potential for Peace. New York: Oxford University Press. ISBN 0-19-530948-0
- Fry, Douglas P. (2006). The Human Potential for Peace: An Anthropological Challenge to Assumptions about War and Violence. New York: Oxford University Press. ISBN 0-19-518178-6
- Kemp, Graham & Douglas P. Fry (Eds.) (2004).: Keeping the Peace: Conflict Resolution and Peaceful Societies around the World. New York: Routledge. ISBN 0-415-94761-8
- Fry, Douglas P. & Kaj Björkqvist (Eds.) (1997).: Cultural Variation in Conflict Resolution: Alternatives to Violence. Mahwah, NJ: Lawrence Erlbaum Press. ISBN 0-8058-2222-4

=== Articles ===
- Geneviève Souillac and Douglas P. Fry, "The Human Quest for Peace, Rights, and Justice: Convergence of the Traditional and the Modern," How is Global Dialogue Possible?: Foundational Research on Values, Conflicts and Intercultural Thought, Johanna Seibt and Jesper Garsdal, eds. (DeGruyter, 2014), 225–49.
- Douglas P. Fry and Patrik Söderberg, "Myths about Hunter-Gatherers Redux: Nomadic Forager War and Peace," Journal of Aggression, Conflict and Peace Research 6 (2014.):255-66.
- Geneviève Souillac and Douglas P. Fry, "Indigenous Lessons for Conflict Resolution," in The Handbook of Conflict Resolution: Theory and Practice (Third Edition), Peter Coleman, Morton Deutsch, and Eric Marcus, eds. (Jossey-Bass, 2014), 602–22.
- Douglas P. Fry and Patrik Söderberg, "Lethal Aggression in Mobile Forager Bands and the Implications for the Origins of War," Science 341 (2013):270-73.
- Douglas P. Fry, "Life without War," Science 336 (2012):879-84.
- Douglas P. Fry, "Anthropological Examples of Peacemaking: Practice and Theory," in Peacemaking: From Practice to Theory, Volume II, Susan Allen Nan, Zachariah Mampily, and Andrea Bartoli, eds., (Praeger Security International, 2012), 550–62.
- Graham Kemp and Douglas P. Fry, eds., Keeping the Peace: Conflict Resolution and Peaceful Societies around the World (Routledge, 2004).

== Media coverage ==
- "New Study of Foragers Undermines Claim That War Has Deep Evolutionary Roots": https://blogs.scientificamerican.com/cross-check/new-study-of-foragers-undermines-claim-that-war-has-deep-evolutionary-roots/
- Keim, Brandon (18 July 2013). "Human Nature May Not Be So Warlike After All". Wired.
- Interview from NPR: https://radio.azpm.org/p/azspot/2013/8/22/26320-new-study-warfare-may-not-be-part-of-human-nature/
- "A Few Questions for Douglas P. Fry": https://blog.oup.com/2007/02/a_few_questions_15/
- NBC News: http://www.nbcnews.com/science/war-inevitable-debate-rages-among-anthropologists-6C10680040
- Equal time for Free Thought: http://www.equaltimeforfreethought.org/2009/08/02/show-313314-on-human-nature-and-the-potential-for-peace/
- "Imagine all the People": http://atheism.about.com/od/abouthumanism/a/WarPeaceHuman.htm
- Interview from KUCI radio: http://www.kuci.org/podcastfile/1069/_120514%20Doug%20Fry%20Final%2028%20min%2004%20sec.mp3
