= War =

Intense armed conflict

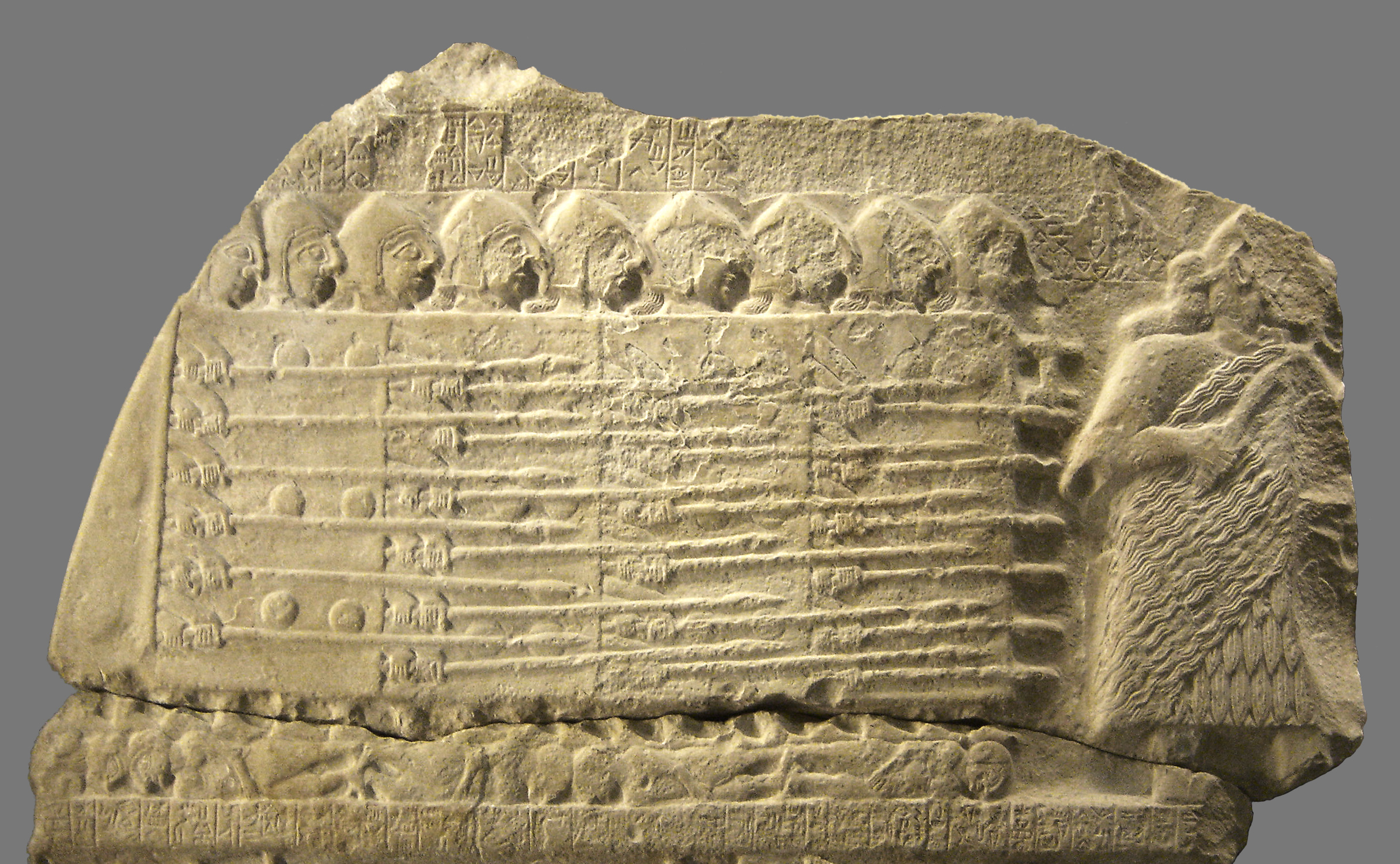
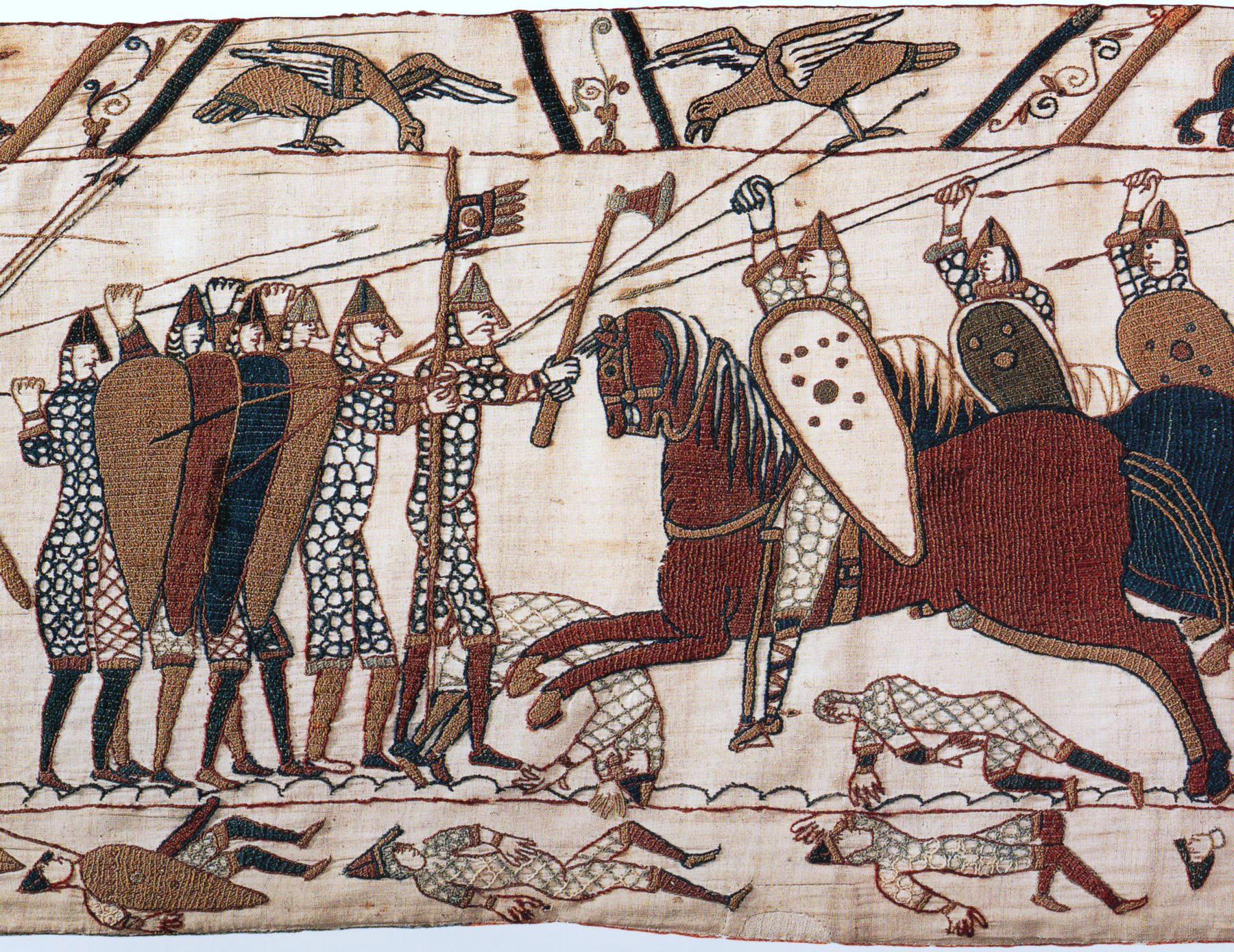
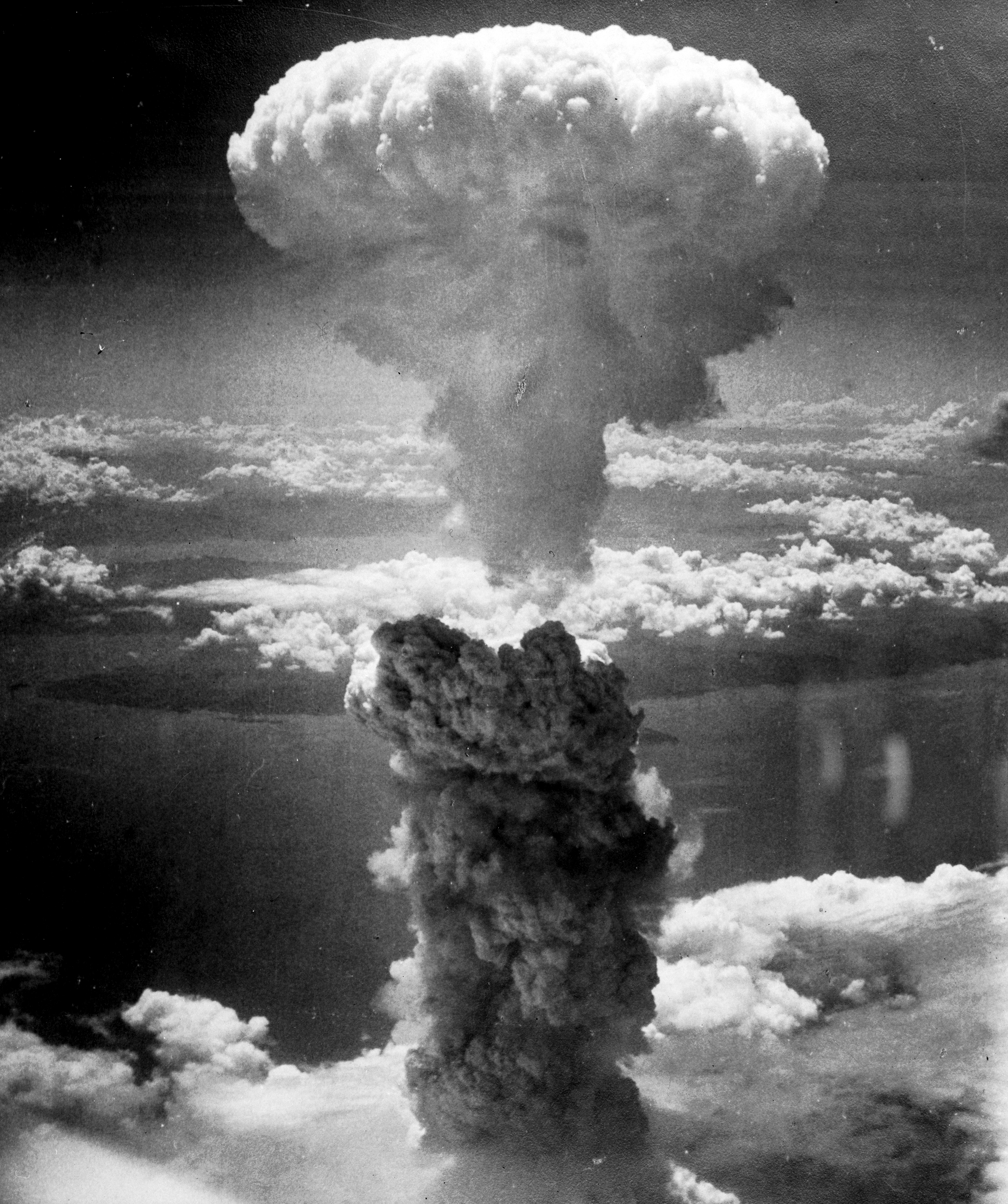
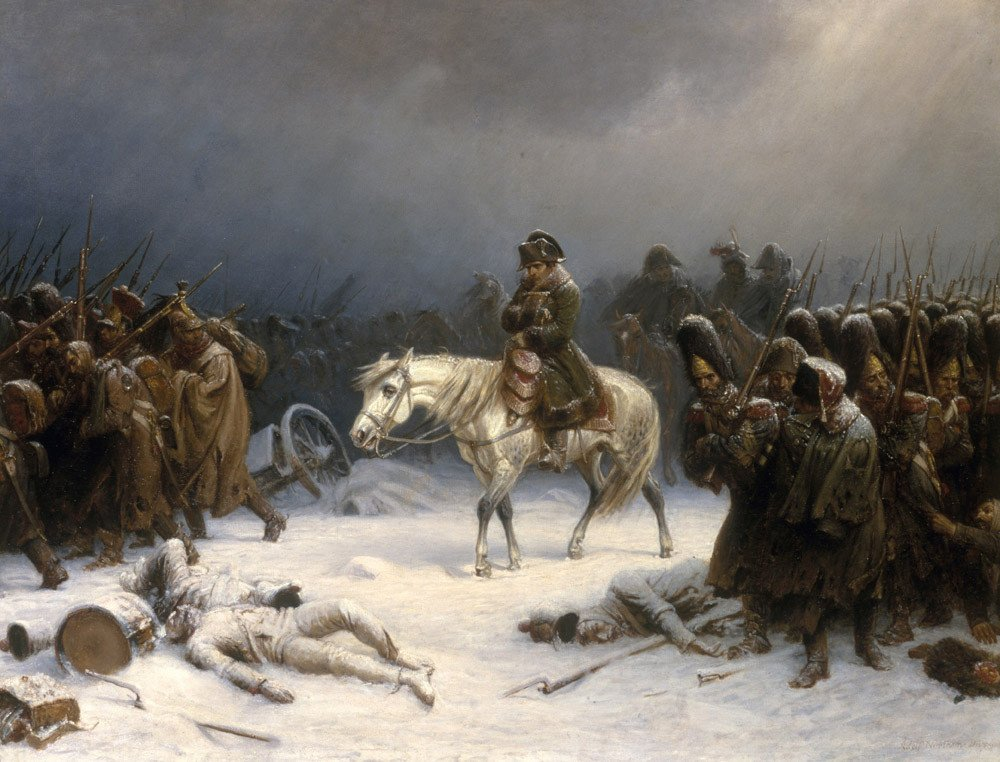
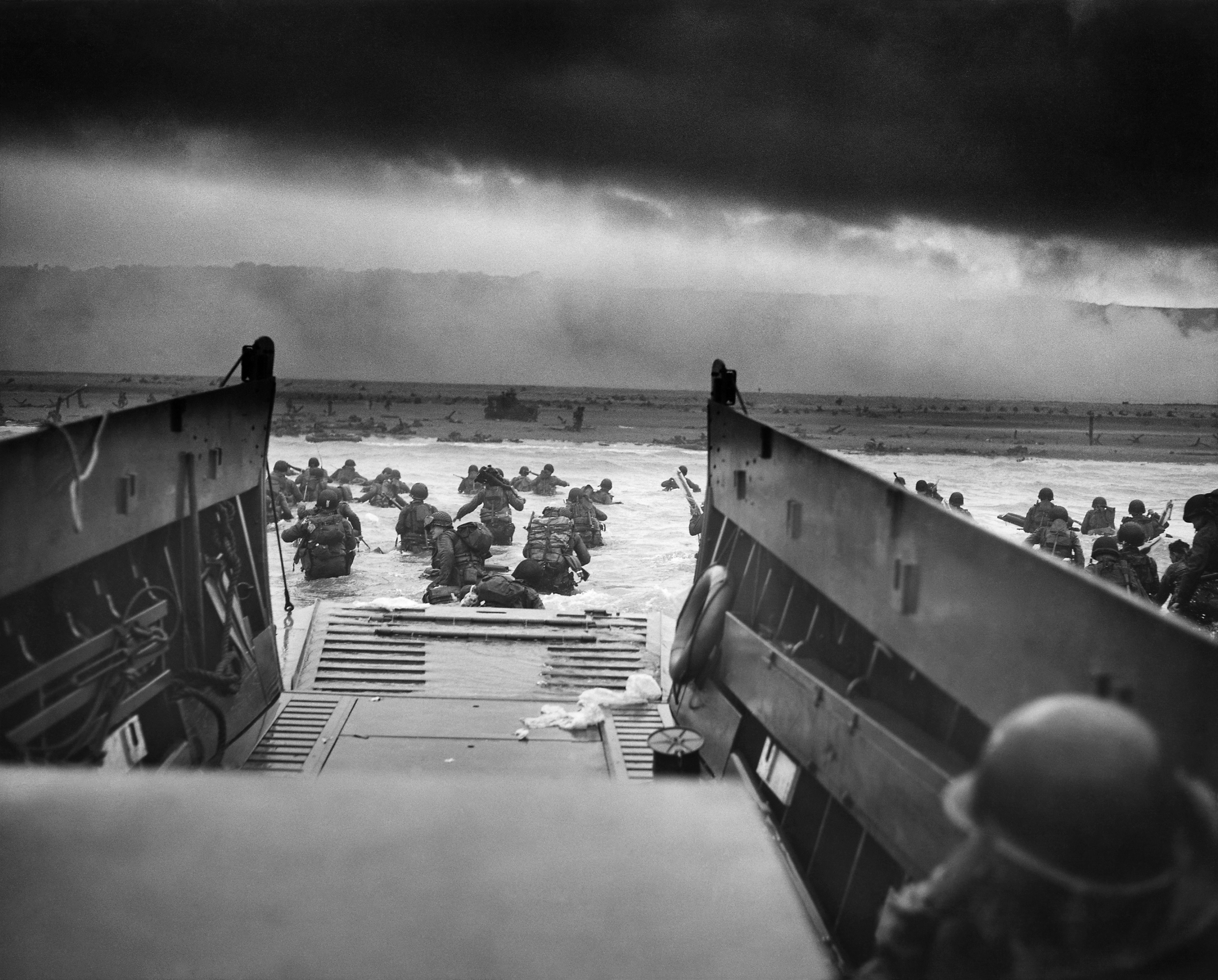
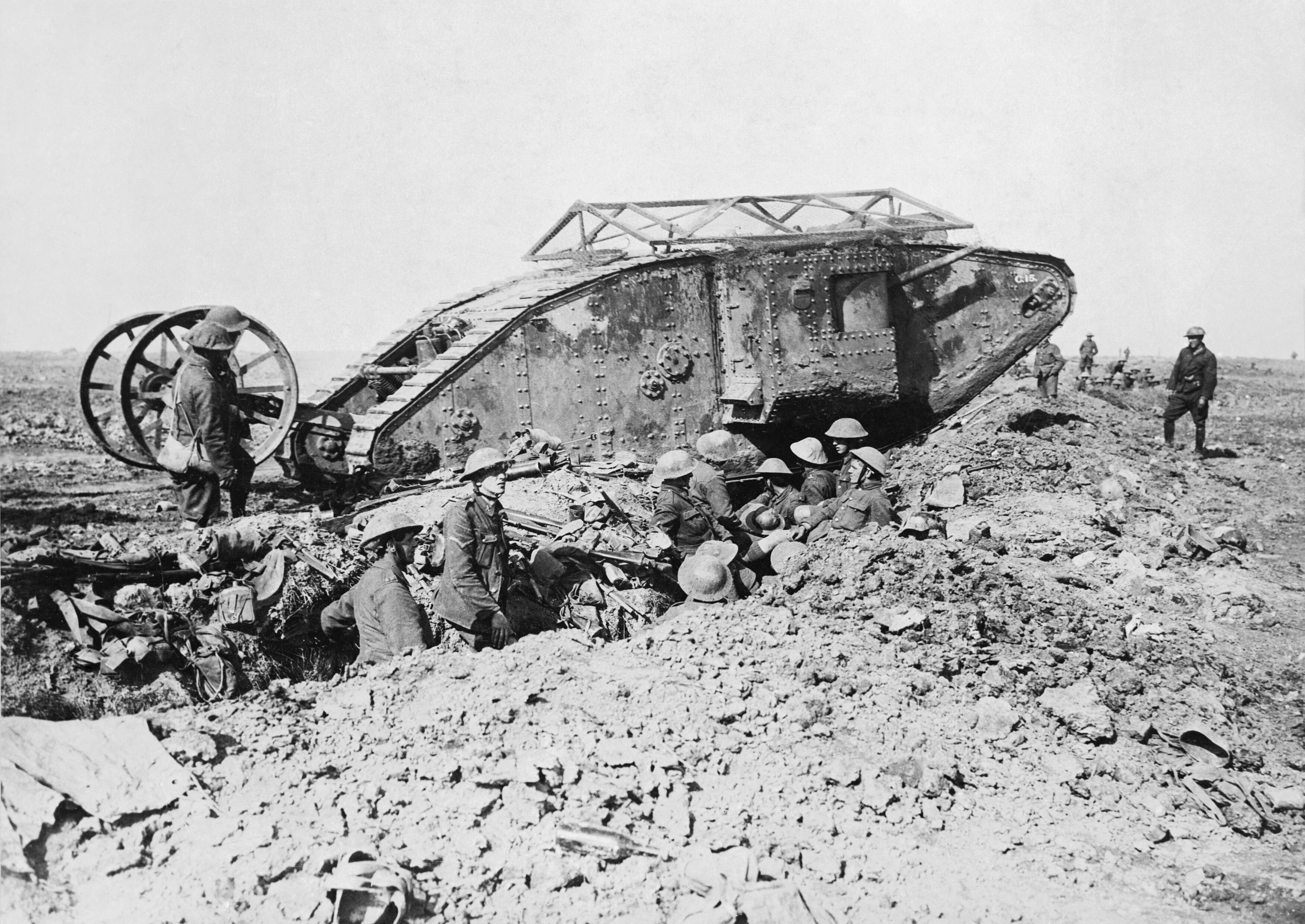
Clockwise from top-left:
Ancient warfare: Stele of the Vultures, c. 2500 BCE
Medieval warfare: Battle of Hastings, 1066
Early modern warfare: Retreat from Moscow, 1812
Industrial age warfare: Battle of the Somme, 1916
Modern warfare: Normandy landings, 1944
Nuclear warfare: Atomic bombing of Nagasaki, 1945

War is an armed conflict (Note: The term "armed conflict" is used instead of, or in addition to, the term "war" with the former being more general in scope. The International Committee of the Red Cross differentiates between international and non-international armed conflict in their definition, "International armed conflicts exist whenever there is resort to armed force between two or more States.... Non-international armed conflicts are protracted armed confrontations occurring between governmental armed forces and the forces of one or more armed groups, or between such groups arising on the territory of a State [party to the Geneva Conventions]. The armed confrontation must reach a minimum level of intensity and the parties involved in the conflict must show a minimum of organisation.") between the armed forces of states, or between governmental forces and armed groups that are organized under a certain command structure and have the capacity to sustain military operations, or between such organized groups.

It is generally characterized by widespread violence, destruction, and mortality, using regular or irregular military forces. War aims typically involve the pursuit of political, economic, or territorial objectives. Warfare refers to the common activities and characteristics of types of war, or of wars in general. Total war is warfare that is not restricted to purely legitimate military targets, and can result in massive civilian or other non-combatant suffering and casualties.

War has changed in numerous ways over the course of history. Since 1945, (Note: The final year of World War II) great power wars, territorial conquests and war declarations have declined in frequency. However, war in general has not necessarily declined. Civil wars have increased in absolute terms since 1945. Wars have been increasingly regulated by international humanitarian law. Battle deaths and casualties have declined, in part due to advances in military medicine.

== Etymology ==
The English word war derives from the 11th-century Old English words wyrre and werre, from Old French werre (guerre as in modern French), in turn from the Frankish *werra, ultimately deriving from the Proto-Germanic *werzō 'mixture, confusion'. The word is related to the Old Saxon werran, Old High German werran, and the modern German verwirren, meaning 'to confuse, to perplex, to bring into confusion'.

== History ==
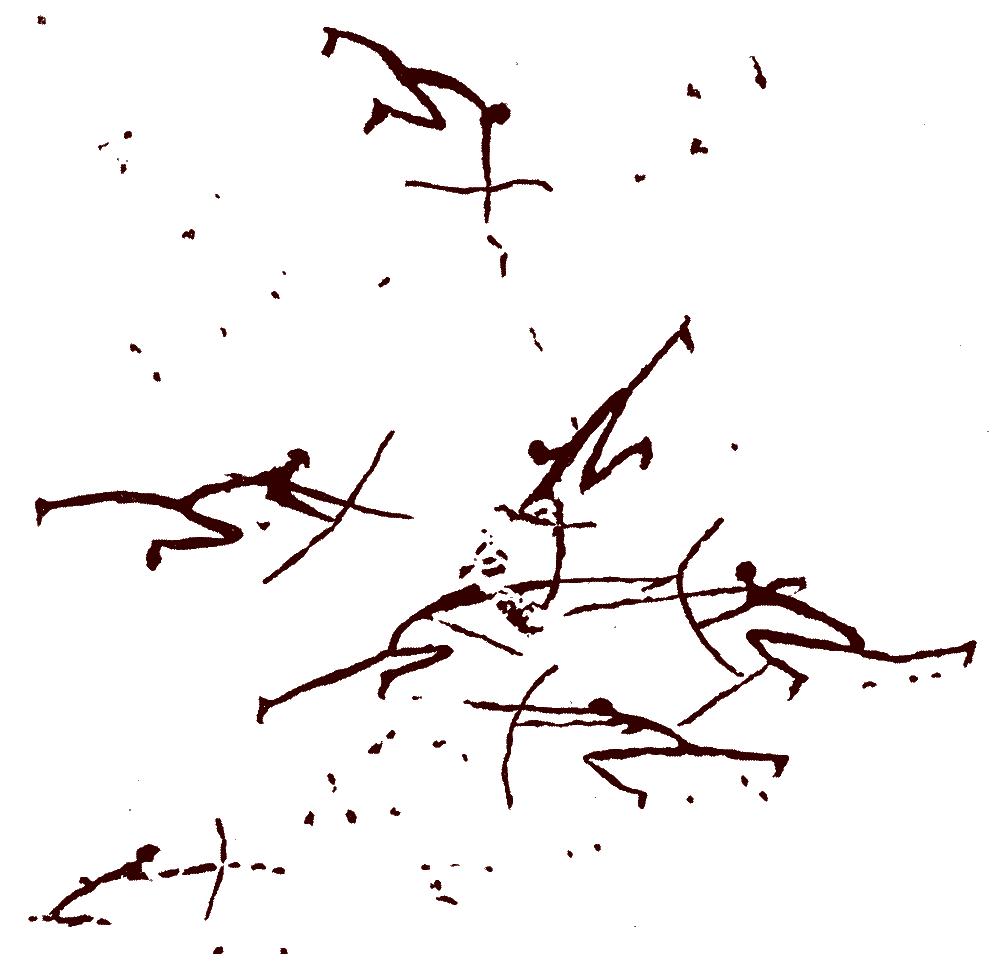
Cave painting in Galeria del Roure, in Morella la Vella depicting archery combat

Anthropologists disagree about whether warfare was common throughout human prehistory, or whether it was a more recent development, following the invention of agriculture or organized states. It is difficult to determine whether warfare occurred during the Paleolithic due to the sparsity of known remains. Some sources claim that most Middle and Upper Paleolithic societies were possibly fundamentally egalitarian and may have rarely or never engaged in organized violence between groups (i.e. war). Evidence of violent conflict appears to increase during the Mesolithic period, from around 10,000 years ago onwards.

American cultural anthropologist and ethnologist Raymond C. Kelly claimed that before 400,000 years ago, humans clashed like groups of chimpanzees; however, later they preferred "positive and peaceful social relations between neighboring groups, such as joint hunting, trading, and courtship". In his book Warless Societies and the Origin of War he explores the origins of modern wars and states that high surplus product encourages conflict, so "raiding often begins in the richest environments".

In his 1996 book War Before Civilization, Lawrence H. Keeley, a professor at the University of Illinois, says approximately 90–95% of known societies throughout history engaged in at least occasional warfare, and many fought constantly. Keeley describes several styles of primitive combat such as small raids, large raids, and massacres. All of these forms of warfare were used by primitive societies, a finding supported by other researchers. Keeley explains that early war raids were not well organized, as the participants did not have any formal training. Scarcity of resources meant defensive works were not a cost-effective way to protect the society against enemy raids. William Rubinstein wrote "Pre-literate societies, even those organized in a relatively advanced way, were renowned for their studied cruelty.'"

Since the rise of the state some 5,000 years ago, military activity has continued over much of the globe. In Europe the oldest known battlefield is thought to date to 1250 BC. The Bronze Age has been described as a key period in the intensification of warfare, with the emergence of dedicated warriors and the development of metal weapons like swords. Two other commonly named periods of increase are the Axial Age and Modern Times. The invention of gunpowder, and its eventual use in warfare, together with the acceleration of technological advances, have fomented major changes to war itself.

The percentages of men killed in war in eight tribal societies, and Europe and the U.S. in the 20th century. (Lawrence H. Keeley, archeologist)

In Coercion, Capital, and European States, AD 990–1992, Charles Tilly argued that "war made the state, and the state made war", saying that wars have led to creation of states which in their turn perpetuate war. Tilly's theory of state formation is considered dominant in the state formation literature.

Since 1945, great power wars, territorial conquests and war declarations have declined in frequency. Wars have been increasingly regulated by international humanitarian law. Battle deaths and casualties have declined, in part due to advances in military medicine and despite advances in weapons. In Western Europe, since the late 18th century, more than 150 conflicts and about 600 battles have taken place, but no battle has taken place since 1945. According to Michael Spagat and William Thompson, great power war in Western Europe shows a sustained decline since the 16th century.

Scholars have debated the question of decline in wars and the purported causes behind such a decline. Joshua Goldstein, John Mueller and Steven Pinker have argued that war is in decline, while Bear F. Braumoeller has challenged such claims.

However, civil wars have increased in absolute terms since 1945. A distinctive feature of war since 1945 is that combat has largely been a matter of civil wars and insurgencies. The major exceptions were the Korean War, the Indo-Pakistani War of 1971, the Iran–Iraq War, the Gulf War, the Eritrean–Ethiopian War, and the Russo-Ukrainian War.

== Types of warfare ==
- Asymmetric warfare is the methods used in conflicts between belligerents of drastically different levels of military capability or size.
- Biological warfare, or germ warfare, is the use of biological infectious agents or toxins such as bacteria, viruses, and fungi against people, plants, or animals. This can be conducted through sophisticated technologies, like cluster munitions, or with rudimentary techniques like catapulting an infected corpse behind enemy lines, and can include weaponized or non-weaponized pathogens.
- Chemical warfare involves the use of weaponized chemicals in combat. Poison gas as a chemical weapon was principally used during World War I, and resulted in over a million estimated casualties, including more than 100,000 civilians.
- Cold warfare is an intense international rivalry without direct military conflict, but with a sustained threat of it, including high levels of military preparations, expenditures, and development, and may involve active conflicts by indirect means, such as economic warfare, political warfare, covert operations, espionage, cyberwarfare, or proxy wars.
- Conventional warfare is a form of warfare between states in which nuclear, biological, chemical or radiological weapons are not used or see limited deployment.
- Cyberwarfare involves the actions by a nation-state or international organization to attack and attempt to damage another nation's information systems.
- Insurgency is a rebellion against authority, where irregular forces take up arms to change an existing political order. An insurgency can be fought via counterinsurgency, and may also be opposed by measures to protect the population, and by political and economic actions of various kinds aimed at undermining the insurgents' claims against the incumbent regime.
- Information warfare is the application of destructive force on a large scale against information assets and systems, against the computers and networks that support the four critical infrastructures (the power grid, communications, financial, and transportation).
- Nuclear warfare is warfare in which nuclear weapons are the primary, or a major, method of achieving capitulation.
- Radiological warfare is any form of warfare involving deliberate radiation poisoning or contamination of an area with radiological sources.
- Total war is warfare by any means possible, disregarding the laws of war, placing no limits on legitimate military targets, using weapons and tactics resulting in significant civilian casualties, or demanding a war effort requiring significant sacrifices by the friendly civilian population.
- Unconventional warfare can be defined as "military and quasi-military operations other than conventional warfare" and may use covert forces or actions such as subversion, diversion, sabotage, espionage, biowarfare, sanctions, propaganda or guerrilla warfare.

== Aims ==
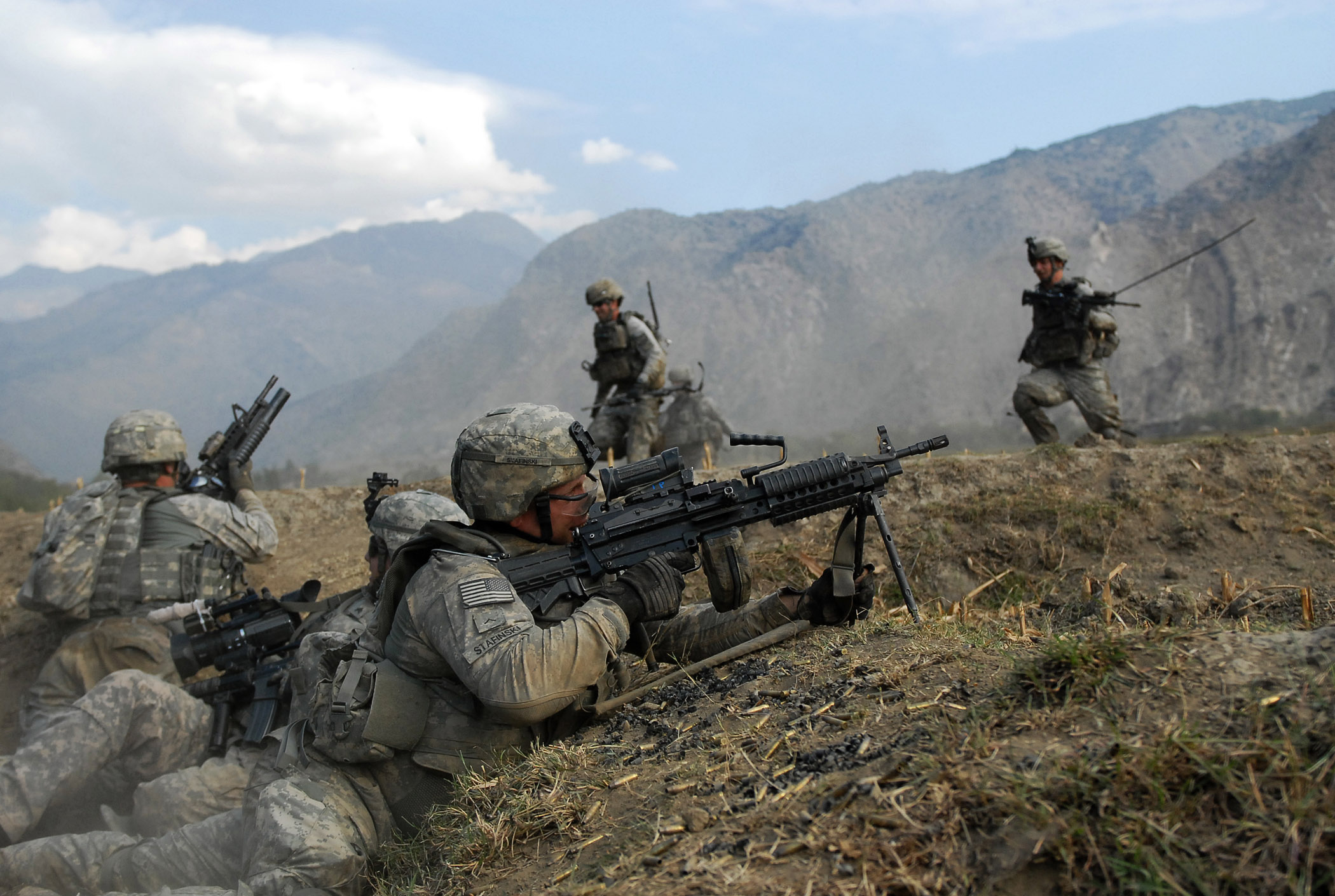
United States Army soldiers engaged in a firefight with Taliban insurgents during the War in Afghanistan, 2009

Entities contemplating going to war and entities considering whether to end a war may formulate war aims as an evaluation/propaganda tool. War aims may stand as a proxy for national-military resolve.

=== Definition ===
Fried defines war aims as "the desired territorial, economic, military or other benefits expected following successful conclusion of a war".

=== Classification ===
Tangible/intangible aims:

- Tangible war aims may involve (for example) the acquisition of territory (as in the German goal of Lebensraum in the first half of the 20th century) or the recognition of economic concessions (as in the Anglo-Dutch Wars).
- Intangible war aims – like the accumulation of credibility or reputation – may have more tangible expression ("conquest restores prestige, annexation increases power").

Explicit/implicit aims:

- Explicit war aims may involve published policy decisions.
- Implicit war aims can take the form of minutes of discussion, memoranda and instructions.

Positive/negative aims:

- "Positive war aims" cover tangible outcomes.
- "Negative war aims" forestall or prevent undesired outcomes.

War aims can change in the course of conflict and may eventually morph into "peace conditions" – the minimal conditions under which a state may cease to wage a particular war.

== Effects ==
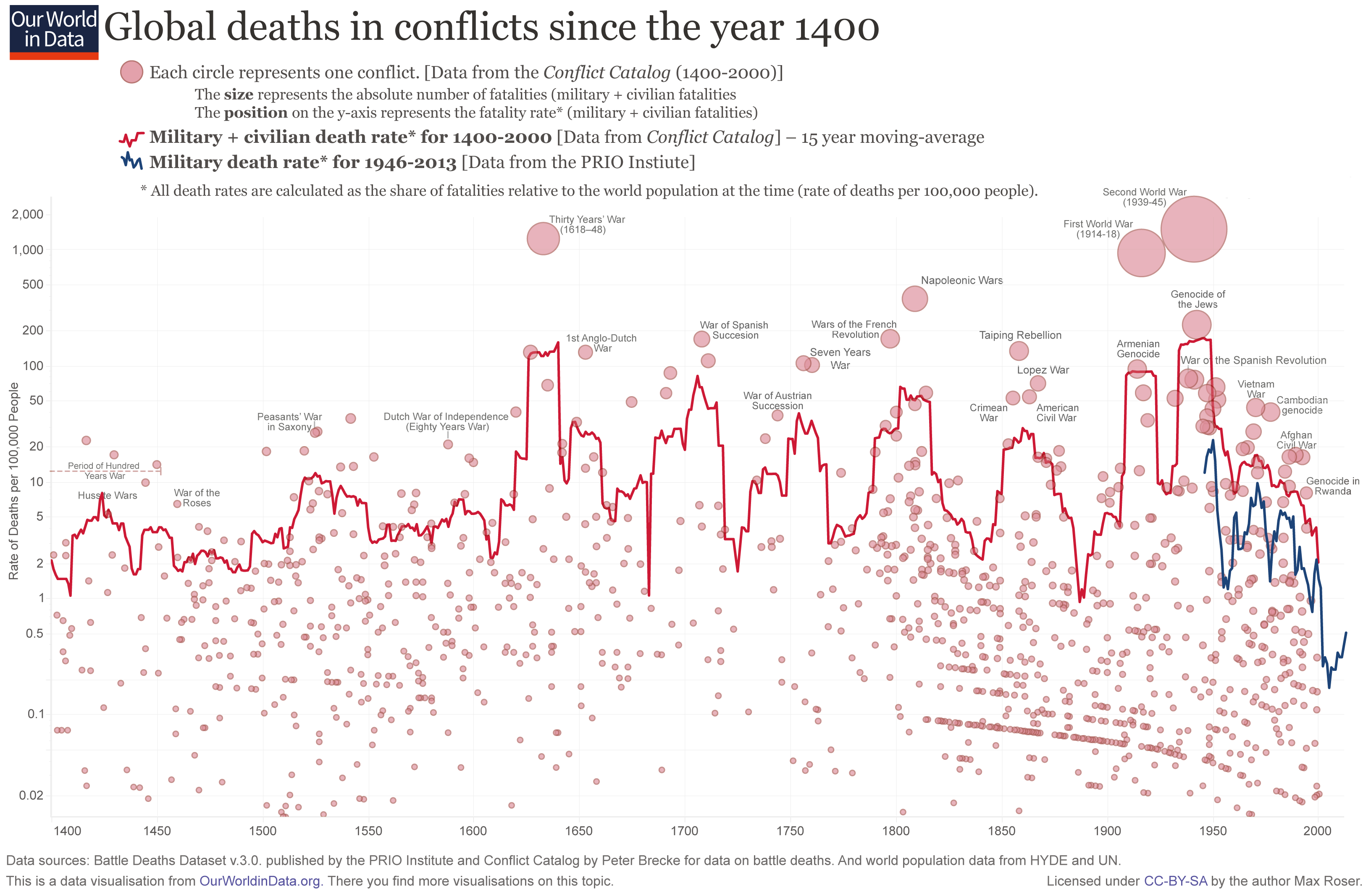
Global deaths in conflicts since the year 1400

=== Conflict zones ===
When a war takes place, one or more areas within a country or across border becomes a war zone or conflict zone. Daily life is interrupted, travel to or across the area may be difficult and international visitors may be advised to leave the area.

=== Casualties ===
Deaths in wars

Estimates for total deaths due to war vary widely. In one estimate, primitive warfare from 50,000 to 3000 BCE has been thought to have claimed 400 million±133,000 victims based on the assumption that it accounted for the 15.1% of all deaths. Ian Morris estimated that the rate could be as high as 20%. Other scholars find the prehistoric percentage much lower, around 2%, similar to the Neanderthals and ancestors of apes and primates.

For the period 3000 BCE until 1991, estimates range from 151 million to several billion. The lowest estimate for history of 151 million was calculated by William Eckhardt. He explained his method as summing the recorded casualties and multiplying their average by the number of recorded battles or wars. This method excludes indirect deaths for premodern wars and all deaths for unrecorded wars. Few premodern wars were recorded beyond Eurasia and only 18 wars were recorded for period 3000–1500 BC worldwide.

Data cumulated since the research of Eckhardt, especially for the non-European world, was collected in this list. Averaging the ranges it provided, the total for 500 BC–2023 AD is about 570 million, or 0.95% of people born in the same period, of them 58 million for 500 BC–AD 500, 117 million for AD 500–1700, and 396 million for 1700–2023.

Meanwhile, researchers shifted from Eckhardt's approach to general estimations of the percentage of the population killed by wars. Azar Gat and Ian Morris both give the lowest estimate of 1% for history including all the 20th century, or about 1 billion. The highest estimates of both scholars exceed the famous "hoax" of 3,640,000,000 people killed in wars which circulated decades in scholarly literature in various countries. Gat gives 5%, or about 5 billion. Morris gives for the 20th century 2%, for 1400–1900 3% in Europe and "slightly higher" elsewhere, 5% for the ancient empires in 500 BC–AD 200, 10% for the rest of history and 20% for prehistory. His total for history is thus about 9 billion.

Approaches to reducing casualties include air defence, and military robots.

=== Largest wars by death toll ===
The deadliest war in history, in terms of the cumulative number of deaths since its start, is World War II, from 1939 to 1945, with 70–85 million deaths, followed by the Mongol conquests at up to 60 million. As concerns a belligerent's losses in proportion to its prewar population, the most destructive war in modern history may have been the Paraguayan War (see Paraguayan War casualties). War resulted in 31,000 deaths in 2013, down from 72,000 deaths in 1990.

War usually results in significant deterioration of infrastructure and the ecosystem, a decrease in social spending, famine, large-scale emigration from the war zone, and often the mistreatment of prisoners of war or civilians. For instance, of the nine million people who were on the territory of the Byelorussian SSR in 1941, some 1.6 million were killed by the Germans in actions away from battlefields, including about 700,000 prisoners of war, 500,000 Jews, and 320,000 people counted as partisans (the vast majority of whom were unarmed civilians). Another byproduct of some wars is the prevalence of propaganda by some or all parties in the conflict, and increased revenues by weapons manufacturers.

Three of the ten most costly wars, in terms of loss of life, have been waged in the last century. These are the two World Wars, followed by the Second Sino-Japanese War (which is sometimes considered part of World War II, or as overlapping). Most of the others involved China or neighboring peoples. The death toll of World War II, being over 60 million, surpasses all other war-death-tolls.

Deaths (millions)	Date	War
70–85	1939–1945	World War II (see World War II casualties)
60	13th century	Mongol Conquests (see Mongol invasions and Tatar invasions)
40	1850–1864	Taiping Rebellion (see Dungan Revolt)
36	755–763	An Lushan Rebellion (death toll uncertain)
25	1616–1662	Qing dynasty conquest of Ming dynasty
15–22	1914–1918	World War I (see World War I casualties)
20	1937–1945	Second Sino-Japanese War
20	1370–1405	Conquests of Tamerlane
20.77	1862–1877	Dungan Revolt
5–9	1917–1922	Russian Civil War and Foreign Intervention

=== On military personnel ===
Military personnel subject to combat in war often suffer mental and physical injuries, including depression, posttraumatic stress disorder, disease, injury, and death.

In every war in which American soldiers have fought in, the chances of becoming a psychiatric casualty – of being debilitated for some period of time as a consequence of the stresses of military life – were greater than the chances of being killed by enemy fire.

— No More Heroes, Richard Gabriel

Swank and Marchand's World War II study found that after sixty days of continuous combat, 98% of all surviving military personnel will become psychiatric casualties. Psychiatric casualties manifest themselves in fatigue cases, confusional states, conversion hysteria, anxiety, obsessional and compulsive states, and character disorders.

One-tenth of mobilised American men were hospitalised for mental disturbances between 1942 and 1945, and after thirty-five days of uninterrupted combat, 98% of them manifested psychiatric disturbances in varying degrees.

— 14–18: Understanding the Great War, Stéphane Audoin-Rouzeau, Annette Becker

Additionally, it has been estimated anywhere from 18% to 54% of Vietnam war veterans suffered from posttraumatic stress disorder.

Based on 1860 census figures, 8% of all white American males aged 13 to 43 died in the American Civil War, including about 6% in the North and approximately 18% in the South. The war remains the deadliest conflict in American history, resulting in the deaths of 620,000 military personnel. United States military casualties of war since 1775 have totaled over two million. Of the 60 million European military personnel who were mobilized in World War I, 8 million were killed, 7 million were permanently disabled, and 15 million were seriously injured.

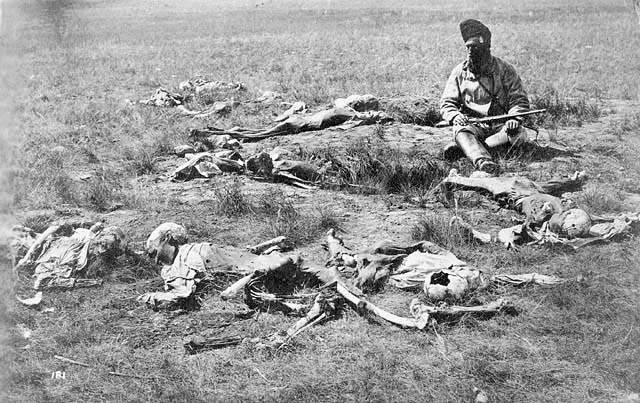
The remains of dead Crow Indians killed and scalped by Sioux c. 1874

During Napoleon's retreat from Moscow, more French military personnel died of typhus than were killed by the Russians. Of the 450,000 soldiers who crossed the Neman on 25 June 1812, less than 40,000 returned. More military personnel were killed from 1500 to 1914 by typhus than from military action. In addition, if it were not for modern medical advances there would be thousands more dead from disease and infection. For instance, during the Seven Years' War, the Royal Navy reported it conscripted 184,899 sailors, of whom 133,708 (72%) died of disease or were 'missing'. It is estimated that between 1985 and 1994, 378,000 people per year died due to war.

=== On civilians ===
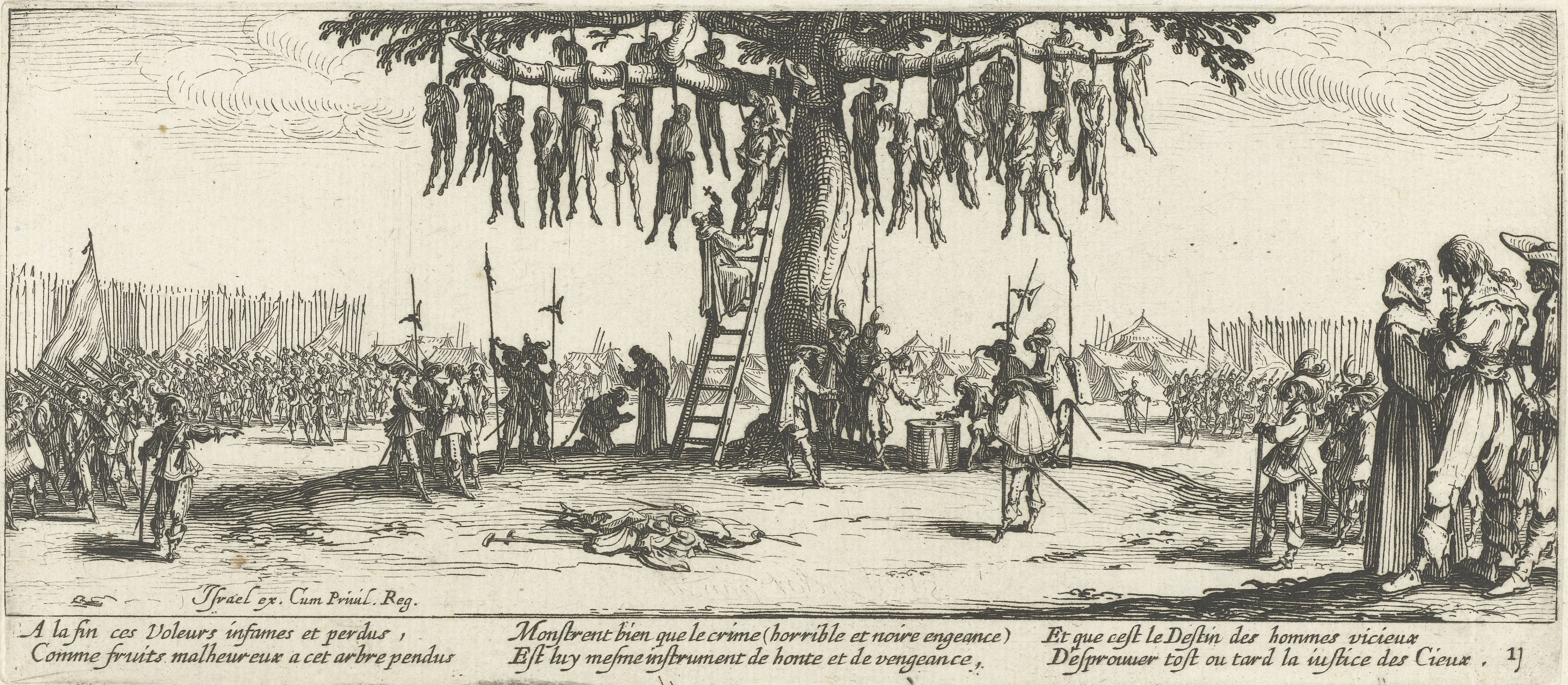
Les Grandes Misères de la guerre depict the destruction unleashed on civilians during the Thirty Years' War.

Most wars have resulted in significant loss of life, along with destruction of infrastructure and resources (which may lead to famine, disease, and death in the civilian population). During the Thirty Years' War in Europe, the population of the Holy Roman Empire was reduced by 15 to 40 percent. Civilians in war zones may also be subject to war atrocities such as genocide, while survivors may suffer the psychological aftereffects of witnessing the destruction of war. War also results in lower quality of life and worse health outcomes. A medium-sized conflict with about 2,500 battle deaths reduces civilian life expectancy by one year and increases infant mortality by 10% and malnutrition by 3.3%. Additionally, about 1.8% of the population loses access to drinking water.

Most estimates of World War II casualties indicate around 60 million people died, 40 million of whom were civilians. Deaths in the Soviet Union were around 27 million. Since a high proportion of those killed were young men who had not yet fathered any children, population growth in the postwar Soviet Union was much lower than it otherwise would have been.

=== Economic ===
Once a war has ended, losing nations are sometimes required to pay war reparations to the victorious nations. In certain cases, land is ceded to the victorious nations. For example, the territory of Alsace-Lorraine has been traded between France and Germany on three different occasions.

Typically, war becomes intertwined with the economy and many wars are partially or entirely based on economic reasons. The common view among economic historians is that the Great Depression ended with the advent of World War II. Many economists believe that government spending on the war caused or at least accelerated recovery from the Great Depression, though some consider that it did not play a very large role in the recovery, though it did help in reducing unemployment. In most cases, such as the wars of Louis XIV, the Franco-Prussian War, and World War I, warfare primarily results in damage to the economy of the countries involved. For example, Russia's involvement in World War I took such a toll on the Russian economy that it almost collapsed and greatly contributed to the start of the Russian Revolution of 1917.

Federle, et al. study the economic effects of large interstate wars using a new data set spanning 150 years of data for more than 60 countries. They found that war on a country’s territory leads, on average, to output decline of 30% and a 15% increase in inflation. GDP in neighboring countries falls by more than 10% over 5 years, and inflation rises on average by 5%.

==== World War II ====
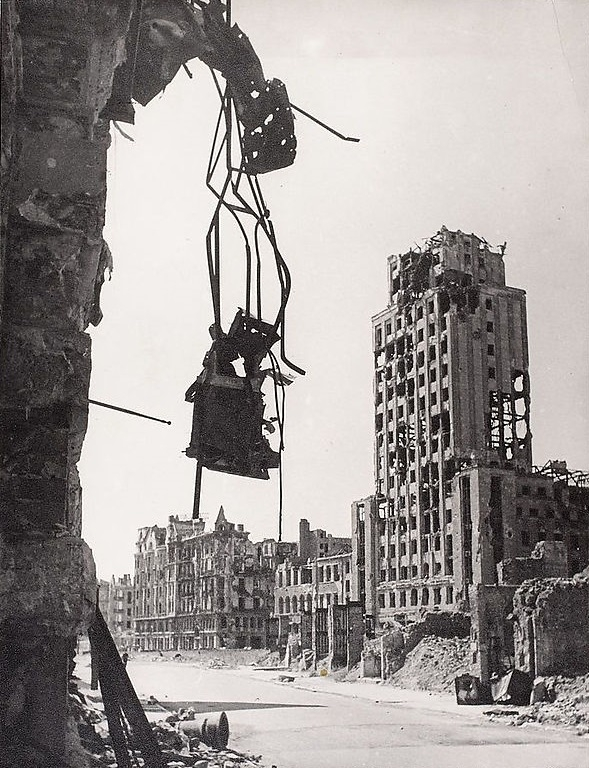
Ruins of Warsaw's Napoleon Square in the aftermath of World War II

World War II was the most financially costly conflict in history; its belligerents cumulatively spent about a trillion U.S. dollars on the war effort (as adjusted to 1940 prices). The Great Depression of the 1930s ended as nations increased their production of war materials.

By the end of the war, 70% of European industrial infrastructure was destroyed. Property damage in the Soviet Union inflicted by the Axis invasion was estimated at a value of 679 billion rubles. The combined damage consisted of complete or partial destruction of 1,710 cities and towns, 70,000 villages/hamlets, 2,508 church buildings, 31,850 industrial establishments, 40,000 mi (64,374 km) of railroad, 4100 railroad stations, 40,000 hospitals, 84,000 schools, and 43,000 public libraries.

== Theories of motivation ==
There are many theories about the motivations for war, but no consensus about which are most common. Military theorist Carl von Clausewitz said, "Every age has its own kind of war, its own limiting conditions, and its own peculiar preconceptions."

=== Psychoanalytic ===
Dutch psychoanalyst Joost Meerloo held that, "War is often...a mass discharge of accumulated internal rage (where)...the inner fears of mankind are discharged in mass destruction." Other psychoanalysts such as E.F.M. Durban and John Bowlby have argued human beings are inherently violent. This aggressiveness is fueled by displacement and projection where a person transfers his or her grievances into bias and hatred against other races, religions, nations or ideologies. By this theory, the nation state preserves order in the local society while creating an outlet for aggression through warfare.

The Italian psychoanalyst Franco Fornari, a follower of Melanie Klein, thought war was the paranoid or projective "elaboration" of mourning. Fornari thought war and violence develop out of our "love need": our wish to preserve and defend the sacred object to which we are attached, namely our early mother and our fusion with her. For the adult, nations are the sacred objects that generate warfare. Fornari focused upon sacrifice as the essence of war: the astonishing willingness of human beings to die for their country, to give over their bodies to their nation.

Despite Fornari's theory that man's altruistic desire for self-sacrifice for a noble cause is a contributing factor towards war, few wars have originated from a desire for war among the general populace. Far more often the general population has been reluctantly drawn into war by its rulers. One psychological theory that looks at the leaders is advanced by Maurice Walsh. He argues the general populace is more neutral towards war and wars occur when leaders with a psychologically abnormal disregard for human life are placed into power. War is caused by leaders who seek war such as Napoleon and Hitler. Such leaders most often come to power in times of crisis when the populace opts for a decisive leader, who then leads the nation to war.

Naturally, the common people don't want war; neither in Russia nor in England nor in America, nor for that matter in Germany. That is understood. But, after all, it is the leaders of the country who determine the policy and it is always a simple matter to drag the people along, whether it is a democracy or a fascist dictatorship or a Parliament or a Communist dictatorship. ... the people can always be brought to the bidding of the leaders. That is easy. All you have to do is tell them they are being attacked and denounce the pacifists for lack of patriotism and exposing the country to danger. It works the same way in any country.

— Hermann Göring at the Nuremberg trials, 18 April 1946

=== Evolutionary ===
Several theories concern the evolutionary origins of warfare. There are two main schools: One sees organized warfare as emerging in or after the Mesolithic as a result of complex social organization and greater population density and competition over resources; the other sees human warfare as a more ancient practice derived from common animal tendencies, such as territoriality and sexual competition.

The latter school argues that since warlike behavior patterns are found in many primate species such as chimpanzees, as well as in many ant species, group conflict may be a general feature of animal social behavior. Some proponents of the idea argue that war, while innate, has been intensified greatly by developments of technology and social organization such as weaponry and states. A study even found that civil war did occur in wild chimpanzee colonies, leading to a violent split in a group of chimpanzees.

Psychologist and linguist Steven Pinker argued that war-related behaviors may have been naturally selected in the ancestral environment due to the benefits of victory. (Note: The argument is made from pages 314 to 332 of The Blank Slate. Relevant quotes include on p332 "The first step in understanding violence is to set aside our abhorrence of it long enough to examine why it can sometimes pay off in evolutionary terms.", "Natural selection is powered by competition, which means that the products of natural selection – survival machines, in Richard Dawkins metaphor – should, by default, do whatever helps them survive and reproduce.". On p323 "If an obstacle stands in the way of something an organism needs, it should neutralize the obstacle by disabling or eliminating it.", "Another human obstacle consists of men monopolozing women who could otherwise be taken as wives.", "The competition can be violent". On p324 "So people have invented, and perhaps evolved, an alternate defense: the advertised deterrence policy known as lex talionis, the law of retaliation, familiar from the biblical injunction "An eye for an eye, a tooth for a tooth." If you can credibly say to potential adversaries, "We won't attack first, but if we are attacked, we will survive and strike back," you remove Hobbes's first two incentives for quarrel, gain and mistrust.". On p326 "Also necessary for vengeance to work as a deterrent is that the willingness to pursue it be made public, because the whole point of deterrence is to give would-be attackers second thoughts beforehand. And this brings us to Hobbes's final reason for quarrel. Thirdly, glory – though a more accurate word would be "honor".") He also argued that in order to have credible deterrence against other groups (as well as on an individual level), it was important to have a reputation for retaliation, causing humans to develop instincts for revenge as well as for protecting a group's (or an individual's) reputation ("honor"). This idea is the cornerstone of governments' deterrence strategy since World War II. In deterrence theory, the success of this strategy requires the achievement of four pillars: capability, credibility, communication, and stability.

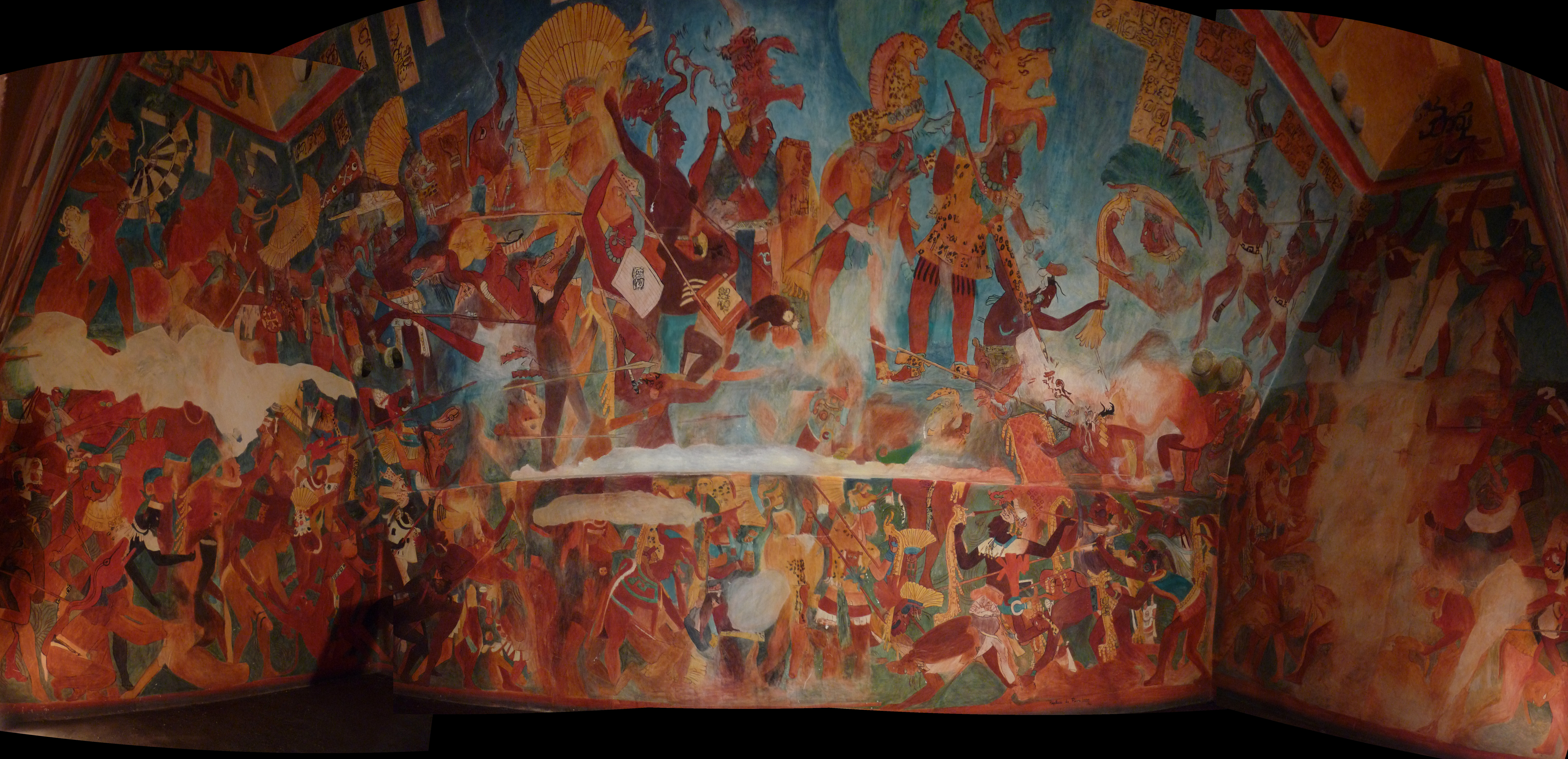
Increasing population and constant warfare among the Maya city-states over resources may have contributed to the eventual collapse of the Maya civilization by 900 CE.

John Tooby and Leda Cosmides argue that natural selection has over the course of human evolution selected for coalitions of males that would initiate attacks in scenarios that were likely to lead to a gain in fitness for the coalition. This overall gain in fitness for members of such a coalition as a whole would counteract the high mortality risk for any individual male in the coalition.

Margaret C. Crofoot and Richard W. Wrangham have argued that warfare, if defined as group interactions in which "coalitions attempt to aggressively dominate or kill members of other groups", is a characteristic of most human societies. Those in which it has been lacking "tend to be societies that were politically dominated by their neighbors".

Ashley Montagu strongly denied universalistic instinctual arguments, arguing that social factors and childhood socialization are important in determining the nature and presence of warfare. Thus, he argues, warfare is not a universal human occurrence and appears to have been a historical invention, associated with certain types of human societies. Montagu's argument is supported by ethnographic research conducted in societies where the concept of aggression seems to be entirely absent, e.g. the Chewong and Semai of the Malay peninsula. Bobbi S. Low has observed correlation between warfare and education, noting societies where warfare is commonplace encourage their children to be more aggressive.

=== Economic ===
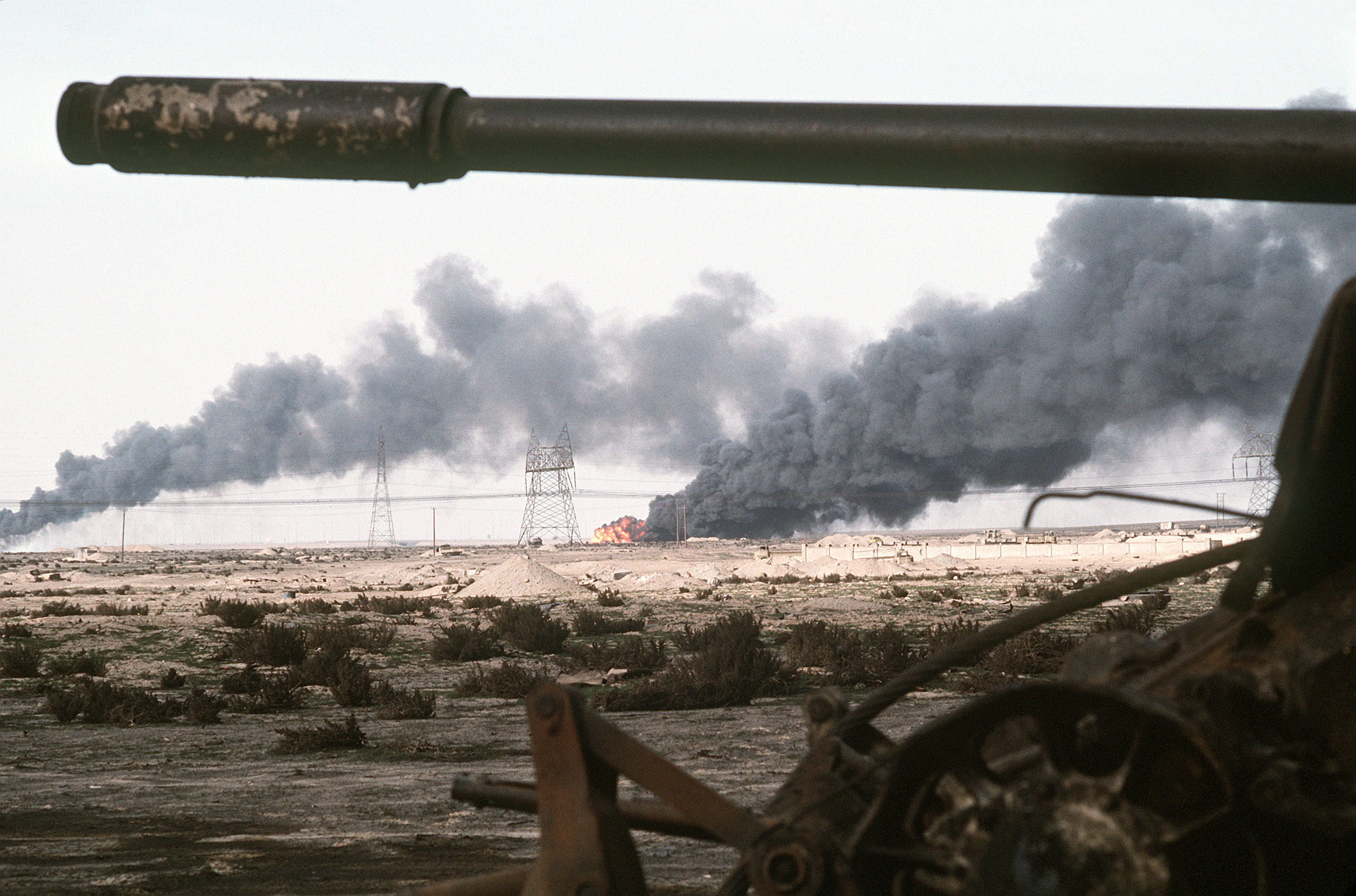
Kuwaiti oil wells on fire during the Gulf War, March 1, 1991

War can be seen as a growth of economic competition in a competitive international system. In this view wars begin as a pursuit of markets for natural resources and for wealth. War has also been linked to economic development by economic historians and development economists studying state-building and fiscal capacity. While this theory has been applied to many conflicts, such counter arguments become less valid as the increasing mobility of capital and information level the distributions of wealth worldwide, or when considering that it is relative, not absolute, wealth differences that may fuel wars. There are those on the extreme right of the political spectrum who provide support, fascists in particular, by asserting a natural right of a strong nation to whatever the weak cannot hold by force.

=== Marxist ===
The Marxist theory of war is quasi-economic in that it states all modern wars are caused by competition for resources and markets between great (imperialist) powers, claiming these wars are a natural result of capitalism. Marxist economists Karl Kautsky, Rosa Luxemburg, Rudolf Hilferding and Vladimir Lenin theorized that imperialism was the result of capitalist countries needing new markets. Expansion of the means of production is only possible if there is a corresponding growth in consumer demand. Since the workers in a capitalist economy would be unable to fill the demand, producers must expand into non-capitalist markets to find consumers for their goods, hence driving imperialism.

=== Demographic ===
Demographic theories can be grouped into two classes, Malthusian and youth bulge theories:

==== Malthusian ====
Malthusian theories see expanding population and scarce resources as a source of violent conflict. Pope Urban II in 1095, on the eve of the First Crusade, advocating Crusade as a solution to European overpopulation, said:

For this land which you now inhabit, shut in on all sides by the sea and the mountain peaks, is too narrow for your large population; it scarcely furnishes food enough for its cultivators. Hence it is that you murder and devour one another, that you wage wars, and that many among you perish in civil strife. Let hatred, therefore, depart from among you; let your quarrels end. Enter upon the road to the Holy Sepulchre; wrest that land from a wicked race, and subject it to yourselves.

This is one of the earliest expressions of what has come to be called the Malthusian theory of war, in which wars are caused by expanding populations and limited resources. Thomas Malthus (1766–1834) wrote that populations always increase until they are limited by war, disease, or famine. The violent herder–farmer conflicts in Nigeria, Mali, Sudan and other countries in the Sahel region have been exacerbated by land degradation and population growth.

==== Youth bulge ====
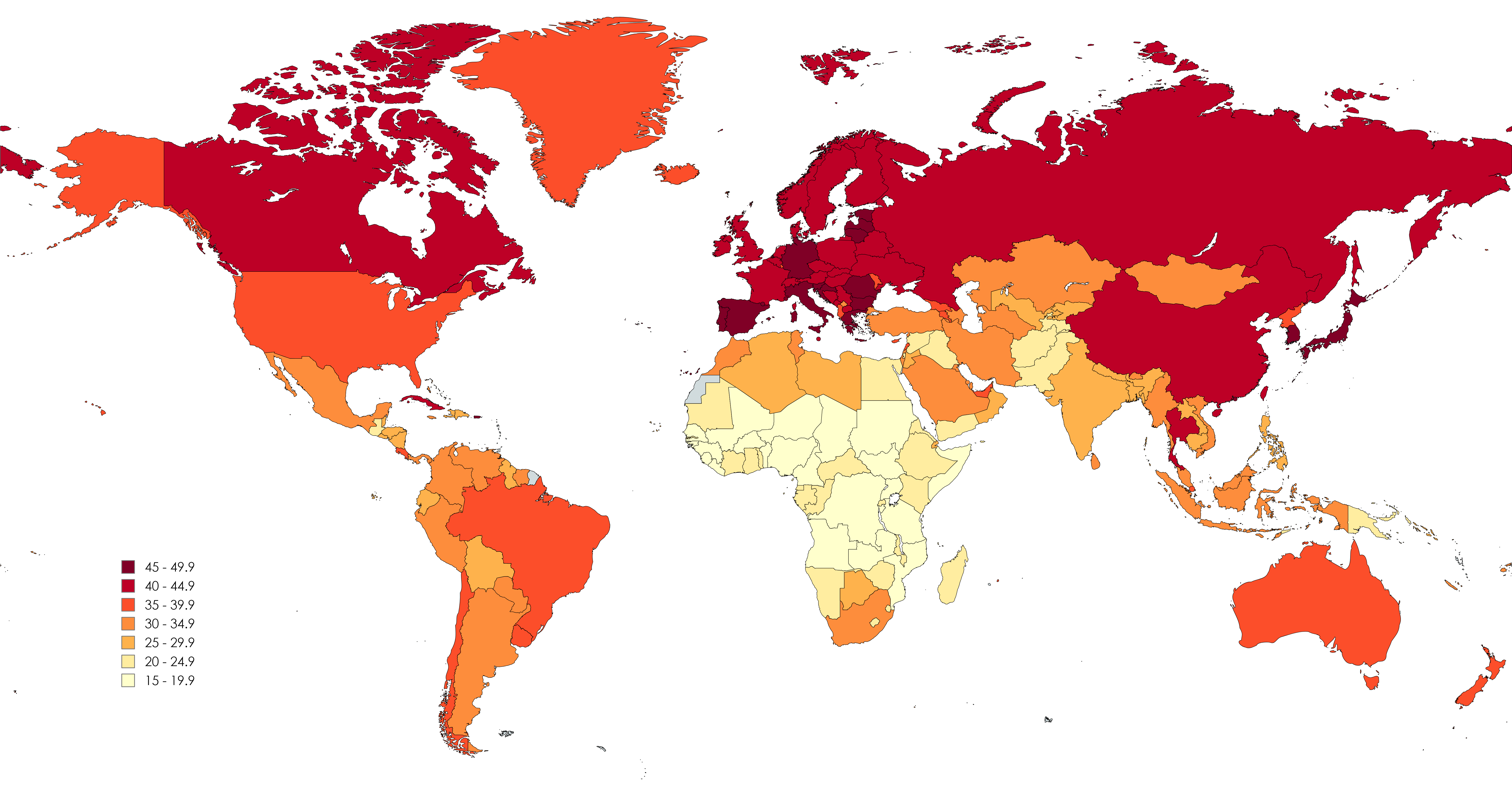
Median age by country. A youth bulge is evident for Africa, and to a lesser extent in some countries in West Asia, South Asia, Southeast Asia and Central America.

According to Heinsohn, who proposed youth bulge theory in its most generalized form, a youth bulge occurs when 30 to 40 percent of the males of a nation belong to the "fighting age" cohorts from 15 to 29 years of age. It will follow periods with total fertility rates as high as 4–8 children per woman with a 15–29-year delay. Heinsohn saw both past "Christianist" European colonialism and imperialism, as well as today's Islamist civil unrest and terrorism as results of high birth rates producing youth bulges.

Among prominent historical events that have been attributed to youth bulges are the role played by the historically large youth cohorts in the rebellion and revolution waves of early modern Europe, including the French Revolution of 1789, and the effect of economic depression upon the largest German youth cohorts ever in explaining the rise of Nazism in Germany in the 1930s. The 1994 Rwandan genocide has also been analyzed as following a massive youth bulge. Youth bulge theory has been subjected to statistical analysis by the World Bank, Population Action International, and the Berlin Institute for Population and Development. Youth bulge theories have been criticized as leading to racial, gender and age discrimination.

=== Cultural ===
Geoffrey Parker argues that what distinguishes the "Western way of war" based in Western Europe chiefly allows historians to explain its extraordinary success in conquering most of the world after 1500:

The Western way of war rests upon five principal foundations: technology, discipline, a highly aggressive military tradition, a remarkable capacity to innovate and to respond rapidly to the innovation of others and – from about 1500 onward – a unique system of war finance. The combination of all five provided a formula for military success....The outcome of wars has been determined less by technology, then by better war plans, the achievement of surprise, greater economic strength, and above all superior discipline.

Parker argues that Western armies were stronger because they emphasized discipline, that is, "the ability of a formation to stand fast in the face of the enemy, where they're attacking or being attacked, without giving way to the natural impulse of fear and panic." Discipline came from drills and marching in formation, target practice, and creating small "artificial kinship groups: such as the company and the platoon, to enhance psychological cohesion and combat efficiency.

=== Rationalist ===
Rationalism is an international relations theory or framework. Rationalism (and Neorealism (international relations)) operate under the assumption that states or international actors are rational, seek the best possible outcomes for themselves, and desire to avoid the costs of war. Under one game theory approach, rationalist theories posit all actors can bargain, would be better off if war did not occur, and likewise seek to understand why war nonetheless reoccurs. Under another rationalist game theory without bargaining, the peace war game, optimal strategies can still be found that depend upon number of iterations played. In "Rationalist Explanations for War", James Fearon examined three rationalist explanations for why some countries engage in war:

- Issue indivisibilities
- Incentives to misrepresent or information asymmetry
- Commitment problems

"Issue indivisibility" occurs when the two parties cannot avoid war by bargaining, because the thing over which they are fighting cannot be shared between them, but only owned entirely by one side or the other. "Information asymmetry with incentives to misrepresent" occurs when two countries have secrets about their individual capabilities, and do not agree on either: who would win a war between them, or the magnitude of state's victory or loss. For instance, Geoffrey Blainey argues that war is a result of miscalculation of strength. He cites historical examples of war and demonstrates, "war is usually the outcome of a diplomatic crisis which cannot be solved because both sides have conflicting estimates of their bargaining power." Thirdly, bargaining may fail due to the states' inability to make credible commitments.

Within the rationalist tradition, some theorists have suggested that individuals engaged in war suffer a normal level of cognitive bias, but are still "as rational as you and me". According to philosopher Iain King, "Most instigators of conflict overrate their chances of success, while most participants underrate their chances of injury...." King asserts that "Most catastrophic military decisions are rooted in groupthink" which is faulty, but still rational. The rationalist theory focused around bargaining, which is currently under debate. The Iraq War proved to be an anomaly that undercuts the validity of applying rationalist theory to some wars.

=== Political science ===
The statistical analysis of war was pioneered by Lewis Fry Richardson following World War I. More recent databases of wars and armed conflict have been assembled by the Correlates of War Project, Peter Brecke and the Uppsala Conflict Data Program. The following subsections consider causes of war from system, societal, and individual levels of analysis. This kind of division was first proposed by Kenneth Waltz in Man, the State, and War and has been often used by political scientists since then.

==== System-level ====
There are several different international relations theory schools. Supporters of realism in international relations argue that the motivation of states is the quest for security, and conflicts can arise from the inability to distinguish defense from offense, which is called the security dilemma.

Within the realist school as represented by scholars such as Henry Kissinger and Hans Morgenthau, and the neorealist school represented by scholars such as Kenneth Waltz and John Mearsheimer, two main sub-theories are:

1. Balance of power theory: States have the goal of preventing a single state from becoming a hegemon, and war is the result of the would-be hegemon's persistent attempts at power acquisition. In this view, an international system with more equal distribution of power is more stable, and "movements toward unipolarity are destabilizing." However, evidence has shown power polarity is not actually a major factor in the occurrence of wars.
2. Power transition theory: Hegemons impose stabilizing conditions on the world order, but they eventually decline, and war occurs when a declining hegemon is challenged by another rising power or aims to pre-emptively suppress them. On this view, unlike for balance-of-power theory, wars become more probable when power is more equally distributed. This "power preponderance" hypothesis has empirical support.

The two theories are not mutually exclusive and may be used to explain disparate events according to the circumstance. Liberalism as it relates to international relations emphasizes factors such as trade, and its role in disincentivizing conflict which will damage economic relations. Critics respond that military force may sometimes be at least as effective as trade at achieving economic benefits, especially historically if not as much today. Furthermore, trade relations which result in a high level of dependency may escalate tensions and lead to conflict. Empirical data on the relationship of trade to peace are mixed, and moreover, some evidence suggests countries at war do not necessarily trade less with each other.

==== Societal-level ====
- Diversionary theory, also known as the "scapegoat hypothesis", suggests the politically powerful may use war as a diversion or to rally domestic popular support. This is supported by literature showing out-group hostility enhances in-group bonding, and a significant domestic "rally effect" has been demonstrated when conflicts begin. However, studies examining the increased use of force as a function of need for internal political support are more mixed. U.S. war-time presidential popularity surveys taken during the presidencies of several recent U.S. leaders have supported diversionary theory.

==== Individual-level ====
These theories suggest that differences in people's personalities, decision-making, emotions, belief systems, and biases are important in determining whether conflicts get out of hand. For instance, it has been proposed that conflict is modulated by bounded rationality and various cognitive biases, such as prospect theory.

== Ethics ==
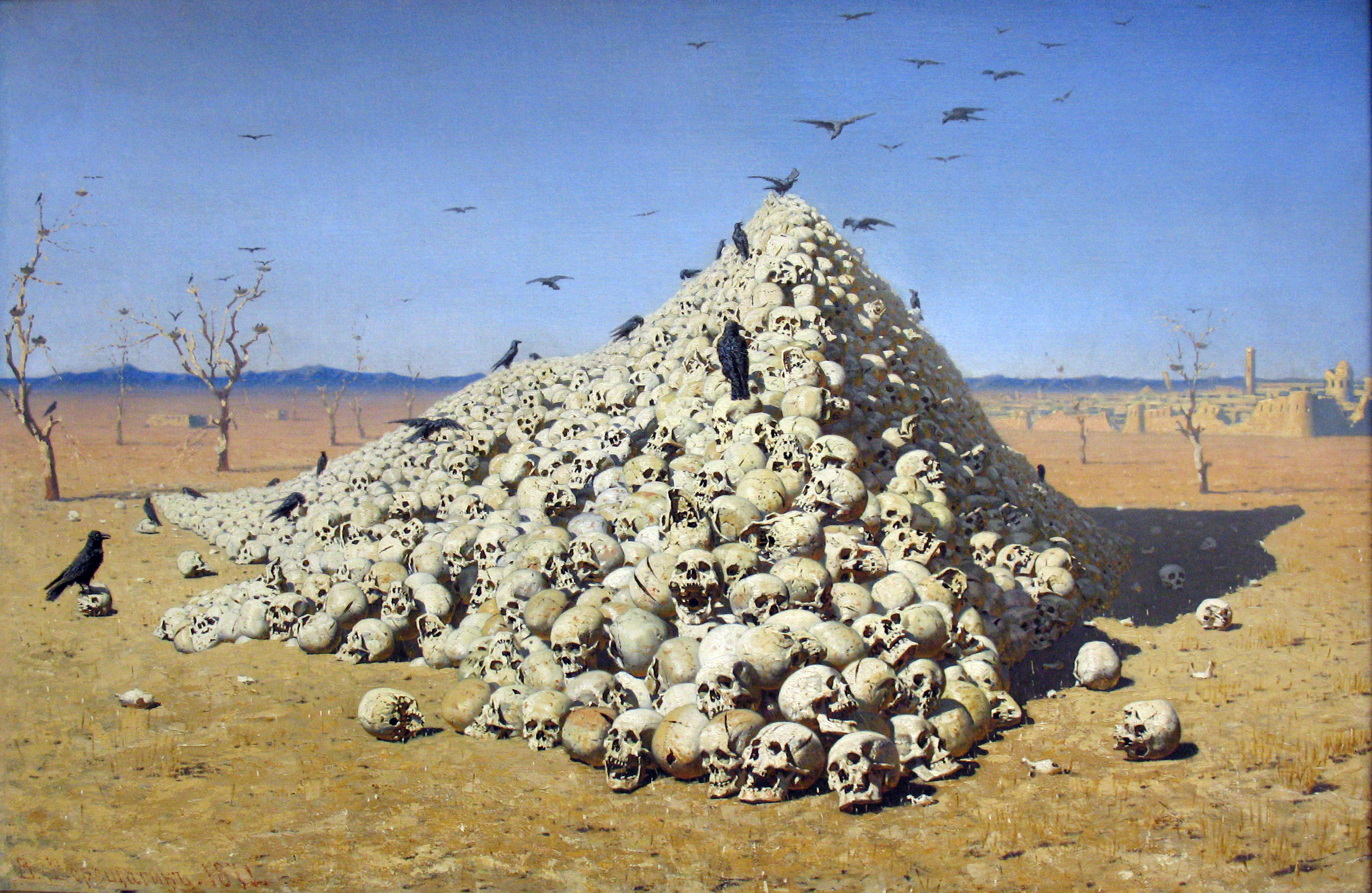
The Apotheosis of War (1871) by Vasily Vereshchagin

The morality of war has been the subject of debate for thousands of years.

The two principal aspects of ethics in war, according to the just war theory, are jus ad bellum and jus in bello.

Jus ad bellum (right to war), dictates which unfriendly acts and circumstances justify a proper authority in declaring war on another nation. There are six main criteria for the declaration of a just war: first, any just war must be declared by a lawful authority; second, it must be a just and righteous cause, with sufficient gravity to merit large-scale violence; third, the just belligerent must have rightful intentions – namely, that they seek to advance good and curtail evil; fourth, a just belligerent must have a reasonable chance of success; fifth, the war must be a last resort; and sixth, the ends being sought must be proportional to means being used.

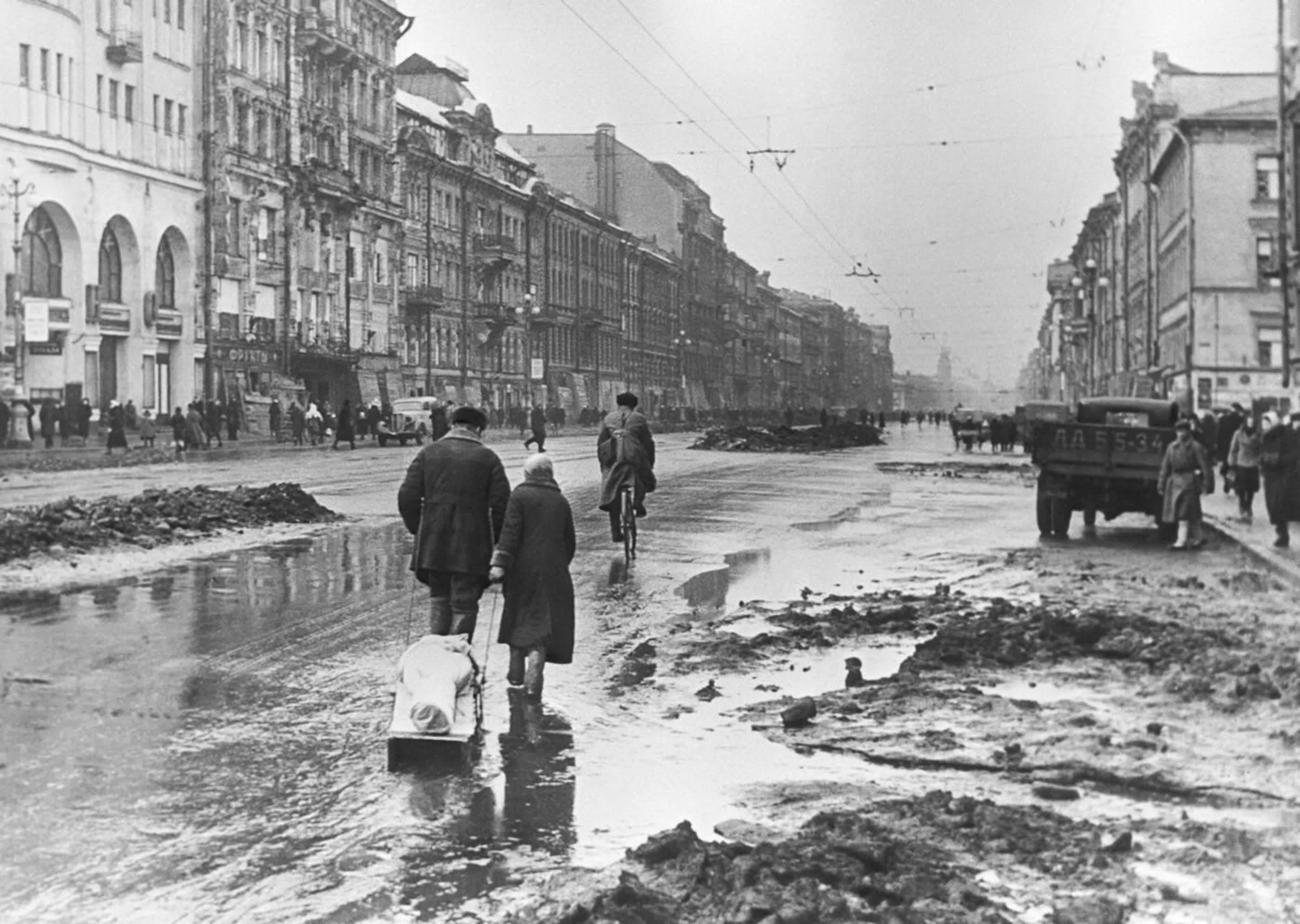
In besieged Leningrad. "Hitler ordered that Moscow and Leningrad were to be razed to the ground; their inhabitants were to be annihilated or driven out by starvation. These intentions were part of the 'General Plan East'." – The Oxford Companion to World War II

Jus in bello (right in war), is the set of ethical rules when conducting war. The two main principles are proportionality and discrimination. Proportionality regards how much force is necessary and morally appropriate to the ends being sought and the injustice suffered. The principle of discrimination determines who are the legitimate targets in a war, and specifically makes a separation between combatants, who it is permissible to kill, and non-combatants, who it is not. Failure to follow these rules can result in the loss of legitimacy for the just-war-belligerent.

The just war theory was foundational in the creation of the United Nations and in international law's regulations on legitimate war.

Lewis Coser, an American conflict theorist and sociologist, argued that conflict provides a function and a process whereby a succession of new equilibriums are created. Thus, the struggle of opposing forces, rather than being disruptive, may be a means of balancing and maintaining a social structure or society.

== Limiting and stopping ==
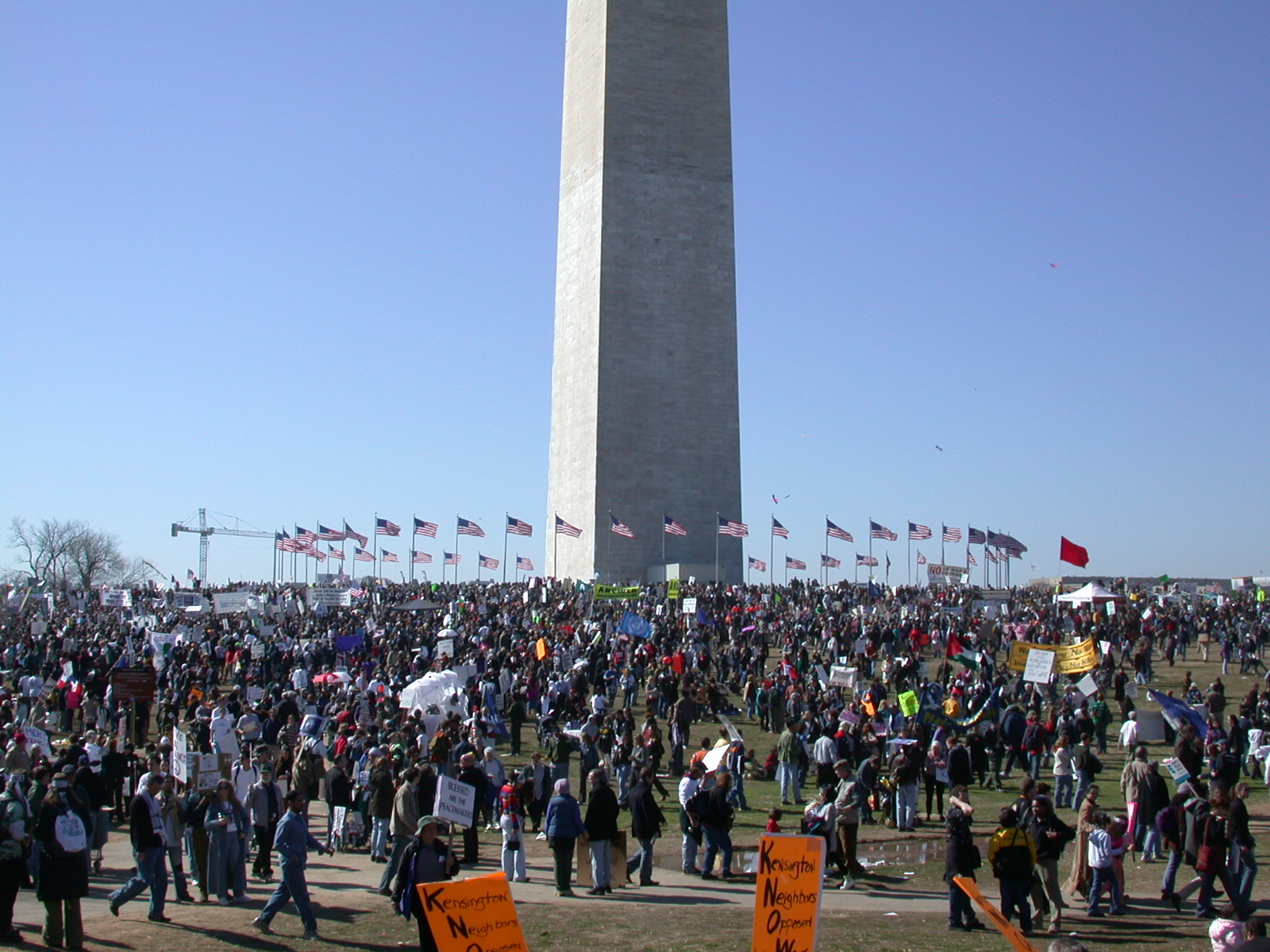
Anti-war rally in Washington, D.C., 15 March 2003

Religious groups have long formally opposed or sought to limit war as in the Second Vatican Council document Gaudiem et Spes: "Any act of war aimed indiscriminately at the destruction of entire cities of extensive areas along with their population is a crime against God and man himself. It merits unequivocal and unhesitating condemnation."

Anti-war movements have existed for every major war in the 20th century, including, most prominently, World War I, World War II, and the Vietnam War. In the 21st century, worldwide anti-war movements occurred in response to the United States invasion of Afghanistan and Iraq. Protests opposing the War in Afghanistan occurred in Europe, Asia, and the United States.

== Pauses ==
During a war, the parties may agree to pauses. A ceasefire is a stoppage of a war in which each side agrees with the other to suspend aggressive actions (often due to mediation by a third party). Ceasefires may be declared as part of a formal treaty but also as part of an informal understanding between opposing forces. A ceasefire can be temporary with an intended end date or may be intended to last indefinitely. A ceasefire is distinct from an armistice in that the armistice is a formal end to a war whereas a ceasefire may be a temporary stoppage.

The immediate goal of a ceasefire is to stop violence, but the underlying purposes of ceasefires vary. Ceasefires may be intended to meet short-term limited needs (such as providing humanitarian aid), manage a conflict to make it less devastating, or advance efforts to peacefully resolve a dispute. An actor may not always intend for a ceasefire to advance the peaceful resolution of a conflict but instead give the actor an upper hand in the conflict (for example, by re-arming and repositioning forces or attacking an unsuspecting adversary), which creates bargaining problems that may make ceasefires less likely to be implemented and less likely to be durable if implemented.

The durability of ceasefire agreements is affected by several factors, such as demilitarized zones, withdrawal of troops and third-party guarantees and monitoring (e.g. peacekeeping). Ceasefire agreements are more likely to be durable when they reduce incentives to attack, reduce uncertainty about the adversary's intentions, and when mechanisms are put in place to prevent accidents from spiraling into conflict.

== See also ==
- Outline of war
