= Berlin Institute for Population and Development =

German think tank

The Berlin Institute for Population and Development (German: Berlin-Institut für Bevölkerung und Entwicklung) is an independent scientific research institute that aims to improve the way in which international demographic change is perceived and dealt with in the context of sustainable development. To reach this goal, the institute publishes studies and discussion papers. It also offers an online handbook on demography and publishes a newsletter. The institute is financed by contributions, project funds, earnings from the foundation's endowment, and contributions to the endowment. The institute is headed by Reiner Klingholz, who studied chemistry, earning a PhD in molecular biology. Earlier in his career, Reiner Klingholz worked as a journalist for the German weekly Die Zeit and the bi-annual magazine Geo Wissen.

== History ==
The Berlin Institute for Population and Development was founded in 2000 by Marlene von Reichenbach and has since been recognised as a foundation (non-profit organisation). The institute has no political or religious affiliations.

During the initial years of its existence, the institute received general support from the William and Flora Hewlett Foundation. Today it has a broad range of sponsors, which are listed on the institute's website. Among the more prominent are the Robert Bosch Foundation, the Erste Foundation, and the Software AG Foundation.

== Publications ==
The Demographic State of the Nation – How Sustainable Are Germany’s Regions? (2006) describes demographic change in Germany and its expected impact on Germany's 439 German regions and municipalities. Based on a set of 22 demographic, economic, social, and educational indicators, the authors of the study come up with an assessment of the sustainability of each of the 439 units covered. Aside from identifying general trends such as an ageing and dwindling population, the study sheds light on some important patterns of internal migration in Germany. The urban regions surrounding big cities like Berlin, Munich and Hamburg, alongside other economically prosperous regions, turn out to be prime destinations for internal migrants.

Male Emergency (2007) analyses the causes and consequences of young women leaving the states of eastern Germany: the regions are becoming poorer – socially, economically and demographically. A portion of the men who have stayed behind now constitute a new underclass. The authors of the study Male Emergency see educational advancement as the main reason for the disproportionate outward migration of young women. They strongly recommend setting up programmes aimed at boosting the motivation and educational qualifications of young males who have fallen behind.

Unintentionally Childless (2007) looks into the question of how reproductive medicine can contribute to mitigating the demographic crisis in Germany. The study concludes that aside from modern family policies and increased efforts to combat the causes of biological-medical infertility, medicine could help couples, whose wish for children has gone unfulfilled, thus contributing, to a certain extent, to raising birth rates.

Talents, Technology and Tolerance (2007) examines, on the basis of Richard Florida’s theory of the creative class, the prospects of Germany's regions in a future knowledge-based society. The theory postulates that a successful economy requires a society in which talent, technology and tolerance can all flourish equally. Measured according to the TTT criteria, Berlin possesses the greatest creative potential among the German states, followed by Hamburg and Baden-Württemberg. By comparison, the eastern German states of Brandenburg, Thuringia, Saxony-Anhalt and Mecklenburg-Western Pomerania lag far behind.

Emancipation or child benefits? (2008) compares the social conditions for different fertility rates in the nations of western Europe based on an array of socioeconomic indicators. It shows clearly that the traditionally negative correlation between wealth and social development on the one hand and fertility on the other no longer holds once a society has reached a certain level of development. Today more children are born in the countries with the most advanced social systems in regard to gender equality. Based on this result, we propose to discuss the problem of low-fertility countries from a different point of view. Neither child benefits nor other sources of financial aid appear to motivate people in modern industrial societies to have more children. What is far more crucial is equality of men and women in society.

Europe’s Demographic Future (2008) is the institute's first major study that has been translated fully into English. The study compares and assesses the various regions of the EU-27 countries as well as Norway, Switzerland, Iceland, as well as a number of selected eastern European countries on the basis of 24 demographic, economic, social, and environmental indicators. The study shows the very different ways in which individual countries are affected by and deal with demographic challenges. The authors of the study map out the ways in which mutual learning can help European countries in dealing with concrete challenges facing them.

Unutilised Potentials – On the Current State of Integration in Germany (2009) is dedicated to the 15 million persons in Germany that have a migration background. In order to assess the integration performance of eight different immigrant groups, the institute has developed an Integration Measurement Index (IMI), which is based on 20 indicators for assimilation, education, working life, and social security. The results of the study show that the roughly two million persons stemming from other EU-25 countries (without southern Europe) are best integrated. On the other hand, migrants from Turkey in particular tend to show massive integration deficits. Looked at in regional terms, integration tends generally to work out better in places where there is demand in the labour market for large numbers of highly qualified workers.
