= Bear F. Braumoeller =

American academic

Bear F. Braumoeller (January 31, 1968, – May 3, 2023) was an American political scientist studying international conflict, international order, statistical methodology, and computational models. At the time of his death (May 2, 2023) he was a Professor of Political Science at The Ohio State University, where he held the Baronov and Timashev Chair in Data Analytics. He founded the MESO (Modelling Emergent Social Order) Lab and co-led the Computational Social Science Community of Practice at Ohio State's Translational Data Analytics Institute (TDAI). Braumoeller graduated Phi Beta Kappa from the University of Chicago in 1990 with a B.A. in Political Science writing his senior thesis under Stephen Walt. In 1998 he completed his PhD in Political Science at the University of Michigan under Robert Axelrod with a thesis titled "Isolationism in International Relations." He began his career in 1998 as an assistant professor of Political Science at the University of Illinois Urbana-Champaign, moving to Harvard University's Department of Government from 2000-2007, before arriving at Ohio State. He was a visiting fellow at the Norwegian Nobel Institute in 2016, and was named a fellow of the American Association for the Advancement of Science in 2021.

Within international relations, Braumoeller is best known for developing the first systemic theory of international relations amenable to statistical testing, culminating in his first book, The Great Powers and the International System: Systemic Theory in Empirical Perspective. The book synthesizes realist and liberal theories of international relations specifying the ways in which individual leaders create the contours of the system that in turn constrain their actions. The book won the 2014 Annual Best Book Award from the International Studies Association and the 2013 J. David Singer Book Award from the ISA-Midwest Conference.

More recently Braumoeller published, Only the Dead: The Persistence of War in the Modern Age, the first book length critique of Steven Pinker's claims about the decline of violence in The Better Angels of Our Nature. Braumoeller argues that statistical analysis provides little evidence in support of the psychological mechanisms Pinker proposes, arguing instead that the rise of international institutions better account for declines in the interstate use of force.

Within political methodology Braumoeller is best known for developing statistical tests tailored to the kinds of hypotheses common in the study of international relations, in particular, Boolean operators, multiplicative interaction terms, the analysis of necessary conditions, and computational models.
