= Bargaining model of war =

Transactional view of violent conflict in international relations theory

In international relations theory, the bargaining model of war is a method of representing the potential gains and losses and ultimate outcome of war between two actors as a bargaining interaction. A central puzzle that motivates research in this vein is the "inefficiency puzzle of war": why do wars occur when it would be better for all parties involved to reach an agreement that goes short of war? In the bargaining model, war between rational actors is possible due to uncertainty and commitment problems. As a result, provision of reliable information and steps to alleviate commitment problems make war less likely. It is an influential strand of rational choice scholarship in the field of international relations.

Thomas Schelling was an early proponent of formalizing conflicts as bargaining situations. Stanford University political scientist James Fearon brought prominence to the bargaining model in the 1990s. His 1995 article "Rationalist Explanations for War" is the most assigned journal article in International Relations graduate training at U.S. universities. The bargaining model of war has been described as "the dominant framework used in the study of war in the international relations field."

== History ==
Carl von Clausewitz was the first to define war as a bargaining interaction. He wrote that war has no value itself, thus no one pursues war without having a larger goal. During the 1950s, the limited conflicts of the Cold War furthered the bargaining theory. Because wars were limited, it was determined that war usually ends with a bargain rather than a total military victory. In the 1960s, Thomas Schelling claimed that most conflicts were bargaining interactions and defined the end of World War II in bargaining rather than military terms. Formal bargaining models of war were introduced in the 1980s. The formal models focused on the causes of war as well as the ends, and defined them as bargaining interactions as well.

== Description ==
The bargaining model of war is a means of describing war as a political rather than economic or social action. The bargaining model of war describes war, its causes and consequences, as a bargaining disagreement over the allocation of resources. Bargaining is defined as an interaction where no one actor can benefit without another suffering a loss, which is the opposite of cooperative interaction, where all involved actors enjoy a benefit. Because war is defined as a bargaining interaction it is always costly and all actors involved suffer a cost of war, outside of the fighting. Therefore, the model assumes that war is the undesired outcome for both actors, and only under the correct conditions will war occur. This is different than economic or other political models of war which propose that war can have a positive net utility, or provide benefits to the victor that are greater than the losses of the defeated. The model makes several assumptions about war. Ultimately, it defines the cause of wars as a lack of information and a high level of uncertainty between actors, the process of fighting a war as a means to reveal information, and the consequence of war as revealed information, allowing for involved actors to adjust behaviors and motivations.

=== Structure ===
The model is linear with two actors, A and B, on the left and right ends of the line, respectively. The line represents a good that A and B are willing to fight over. Point p represents the perceived potential division of the good that will result from a war. Actor A wants p to be as far right as possible, because it receives a greater division of the good, while actor B p to be as far left as possible. Points c_{a} and c_{b} represent the costs of war for A and B respectively. These costs are usually blood and treasure, the financial and manpower losses that result from a war. Points p-c_{a} and p-c_{b} represent the ultimate division of a good for A and B when the costs of war are calculated into the outcome. Both actors are willing to accept any deal that divides the good anywhere between points c_{a} and c_{b}. This is because a point in that range provides a better division than a war. A is willing to accept a point to the left of p because although the division is not in its favor, it is still better than if it were divided based on the costs of war. A is willing to accept a point to the right of p because this is a better division of the good than it predicted. The same reasoning stands for actor B, only in the opposite direction.

- A = actor A
- B = actor B
- C = actor C
- p = predicted division of a good as a result of a war
- c_{a} = the cost of fighting war for actor A
- c_{b} = the cost of fighting war for actor B
- p-c_{a} = actor A's division of the good after the costs of war are calculated
- p-c_{b} = actor B's division of the good after the costs of war are calculated

=== Causes of war based on the model ===
According to James D. Fearon, there are three conditions where war is possible under the bargaining model:

1. Uncertainty: Actors may miscalculate each other's capabilities, preferences, and resolve, making it hard for them to find a mutually acceptable bargain.
2. Commitment problems: actors cannot credibly commit to not use their military strength in the future, which makes it hard to find a mutually acceptable bargain. This is particularly problematic in cases of power transitions or when offensive military capabilities have the advantage over defense military capabilities. A first-strike advantage may force an actor to begin a preemptive war, or the threat of being attacked may cause an actor to start a preventive war.
3. Indivisibility of a good: if actors believe that a certain good could not be divided but only controlled in its entirety they may go to war. Indivisible goods are possible in theory, but extremely rare in practice.

In short, Fearon argues that a lack of information and bargaining indivisibilities can lead rational states into war. Robert Powell modified the model as presented by Fearon, arguing that three prominent kinds of commitment problems (preventive war, preemptive war, and bargaining failure over rising powers) tended to be caused by large and rapid shifts in the distribution of power. The fundamental cause for war in Powell's view is that actors cannot under those circumstances credibly commit to abide by any agreement. Powell also argued that bargaining indivisibilities were a form of commitment problem, as opposed to something that intrinsically prevented actors from reaching a bargain (because actors could reach an agreement over side payments over an indivisible good).

Applications of the bargaining model have indicated that third-party mediators can reduce the potential for war (by providing information). Some scholars have argued that democratic states can more credibly reveal their resolve because of the domestic costs that stem from making empty threats towards other states.

Harrison Wagner argues that the interstate system is one of agreements between states (e.g. to respect each other's sovereignty). These agreements are subject to constant renegotiation because of "exogenous changes in incentives, expectations, or the technology of violence." In other words, the fundamental causes of war are tied to exogenous factors, such as changes in the distribution of power.

=== Signaling ===
Building on canonical work by James Fearon, there are two prominent signaling mechanisms in the rational choice literature: sinking costs and tying hands. The former refers to signals that involve sunk irrecoverable costs, whereas the latter refers to signals that will incur costs in the future if the signaler reneges.

== Limitations ==
The applicability of the bargaining model is limited by numerous factors, including:

1. Cognitive factors: new information does not lead actors to change their beliefs or behaviors in a consistent way
2. Cost-benefit calculations: how do actors determine which costs and benefits to consider?
3. Domestic politics: leaders' aims in war are reflected by personal or domestic political interests rather than what is strictly in the state's interest
4. Constructivism: the identities of actors are realized through conflict
5. Multi-player bargaining: war can be an equilibrium solution to bargaining between more than two actors
6. Divergent interpretations of identical information: two actors can interpret identical information differently
7. Usefulness in individual cases: due to uncertainty, the model cannot explain the onset of war in individual cases

According to Paul Poast and Erik Gartzke, there is a limited amount of empirical tests of the bargaining model.

According to Robert Powell, the bargaining model has limitations in terms of explaining prolonged wars (because actors should quickly learn about the other side's commitment and capabilities). It can also give ahistorical readings of certain historical cases, as the implications of the model is that there would be no war between rational actors if the actors had perfect information. Ahsan Butt argues that in some wars, one actor is insistent on war and there are no plausible concessions that can be made by the other state.

Stephen Walt argues that while the bargaining model of war (as presented by Fearon) is an "insightful and intelligent" formalization of how a lack of information and commitment problems under anarchy can lead states into conflict, it is ultimately not a "new theoretical claim" but rather another way of expressing ideas that the likes of Robert Art, Robert Jervis and Kenneth Oye have previously presented.

Jonathan Kirshner has criticized the assumption of the bargaining model that states will reach a bargain if they have identical information. Kirshner notes that sports pundits have high-quality identical information available to them, yet they make different predictions about how sporting events will turn out. International politics is likely to be even more complicated to predict than sporting events.

According to Erik Gartzke, the bargaining model is useful for thinking probabilistically about international conflict, but the onset of any specific war is theoretically indeterminate. He argues that Fearon's model of conflict initiation only points to necessary conditions for war, not sufficient conditions.

Joshua Kertzer has questioned how actors determine costs and benefits in the first place.

In a 2010 critique of the bargaining model, David Lake argued that the model poorly explains the Iraq War for four reasons. First, domestic political actors (such as Exxon and Halliburton) affected the conduct and possible resolution of the war (the bargaining model assumes that states are unitary actors). Second, in the lead-up to the war, Saddam Hussein was not only signaling to the United States but also Iran and Kurdish minorities in Iraq (the bargaining model is a dyadic model which assumes that there are two relevant actors). Third, the bargaining model assumes that war ends when a settlement is reached, yet the Iraq War demonstrates that it is hard to impose one's will on a defeated opponent. Fourth, both the Bush administration and the Saddam regime demonstrated cognitive and decision-making biases (the bargaining model assumes that actors behave rationally).

=== Explaining prolonged wars with the bargaining model ===
University of Pennsylvania political scientist Alex Weisiger has tackled the puzzle of prolonged wars, arguing that commitment problems can account for lengthy wars. Weisiger argues that "situational" commitment problems where one power is declining and preemptively attacks a rising power can be lengthy because the rising power believes that the declining power will not agree to any bargain. He also argues that "dispositional" commitment problems, whereby states will not accept anything except unconditional surrender (because they believe the other state will never abide by any bargain), can be lengthy.

University of Rochester political scientist Hein Goemans argues that prolonged wars can be rational because actors in wars still have incentives to misrepresent their capabilities and resolve, both to be in a better position at the war settlement table and to affect interventions by third parties in the war. Actors may also raise or reduce their war aims once it becomes clear that they have the upper hand. Goemans also argues that it can be rational for leaders to "gamble for resurrection", which means that leaders become reluctant to settle wars if they believe they will be punished severely in domestic politics (e.g. punished through exile, imprisonment or death) if they do not outright win the war.

== See also ==
- Armistice
- Ceasefire
