= Long Peace =

Absence of major wars following World War II

- Date: September 2, 1945 – present
- Location: Global (primarily Northern Hemisphere)
- Type: Historical period; geopolitical era
- Theme: Great power peace and nuclear deterrence
- Participants: United States; Soviet Union (1945–1991); NATO; Warsaw Pact (1955–1991); People's Republic of China

The Long Peace is a term for the unprecedented historical period of relative global stability following the end of World War II in 1945 to the present day. The period of the Cold War (1947–1991) was marked by the absence of major wars between the great powers of the period: the United States and the Soviet Union.

First recognized in 1986, this period of relative peace has been compared to the 200-year-long stability of the Roman Empire, called the Pax Romana, and the Pax Britannica, a century of relative peace that existed between the end of the Napoleonic Wars in 1815 and the outbreak of World War I in 1914 during which the British Empire held global hegemony.

== History ==
In the 1990s, it was thought that the Long Peace was a unique result of the Cold War; however, when the Cold War ended, the same trends continued in what has also been called the New Peace. The period has exhibited more than a quarter of a century of even greater stability and peacefulness and has also shown continued improvements in related measurements such as the number of coups, the amount of repression, and the durability of peace settlements. Though civil wars and lesser military conflicts have occurred, there has been a continued absence of direct conflict between any of the largest economies by gross domestic product; instead, wealthier countries have fought limited small-scale regional conflicts with poorer countries. Conflicts involving smaller economies have also gradually tapered off. Overall, the number of international wars decreased from a rate of six per year in the 1950s to one per year in the 2000s, and the number of fatalities decreased from 240 reported deaths per million to less than 10 reported deaths per million.

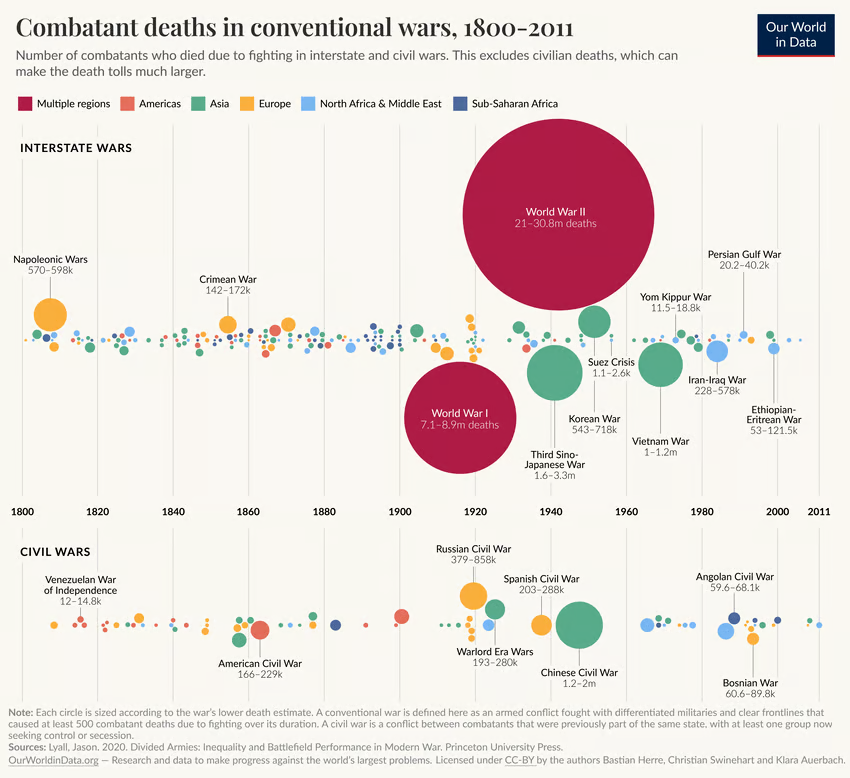
Chart of combatant deaths in wars since 1800, showing relatively few combatant deaths after World War II. Excludes civilian deaths, which can make death tolls much larger.

In 2012, the European Union was awarded the Nobel Peace Prize "for over six decades [having] contributed to the advancement of peace and reconciliation, democracy and human rights in Europe" by a unanimous decision of the Norwegian Nobel Committee. Major factors cited as reasons for the Long Peace have included the deterrence effect of nuclear weapons, the economic incentives towards cooperation caused by globalization and international trade, the worldwide increase in the number of democracies, the World Bank's efforts in reduction of poverty, and the effects of the empowerment of women and peacekeeping by the United Nations; however, no factor is a sufficient explanation on its own and so additional or combined factors are likely. Other proposed explanations have included the proliferation of the recognition of human rights, increasing education and quality of life, changes in the way that people view conflicts (such as the presumption that wars of aggression are unjustified), the success of non-violent action, and demographic factors such as the reduction in birthrates.

In the book The Better Angels of Our Nature, Steven Pinker considers that to be part of a trend that has continued since the beginning of recorded history, and other experts have made similar arguments. While there is general agreement among experts that we are in a Long Peace and that wars have declined since the 1950s, Pinker's broader thesis has been contested. Critics have also said that a longer period of relative peace is needed to be certain, or they have emphasized minor reversals in specific trends, such as the increase in battle deaths between 2011 and 2014 due to the Syrian civil war. In the 2020s, the Russian invasion of Ukraine has been recognized, including by Pinker himself, as having interrupted some of the trends of the Long Peace. Pinker's work has received some publicity, but most information about the Long Peace and related trends remains outside public awareness, and some data demonstrate a widespread perception that the world has become more dangerous.

== See also ==
- Balance of power
- Balance of terror
- Deterrence theory
- Dissolution of the Soviet Union
- Historiography of the Cold War
- Mutual assured destruction
- Pax Americana
- Pax Atomica
- South American Long Peace
