= Arnold Wolfers =

Swiss-American lawyer and scholar

Arnold Wolfers, c. 1950s

Arnold Oscar Wolfers (June 14, 1892, St. Gallen – July 16, 1968) was a Swiss-American lawyer, economist, historian, and international relations scholar, most known for his work at Yale University and for being a pioneer of classical international relations realism.

Educated in his native Switzerland and in Germany, Wolfers was a lecturer at the Deutsche Hochschule für Politik in Berlin in the late 1920s and then became its director in the early 1930s. Initially having some sympathies with the ideas of Nazi Germany, he left that country to become a visiting professor at Yale in 1933, stayed there, and became a U.S. citizen in 1939. In 1935 he was co-founder of the influential Yale Institute of International Studies. As master of Pierson College at Yale, he played a significant role during World War II by recruiting for the Office of Strategic Services. In 1957 he left Yale and became director of the Washington Center of Foreign Policy Research at Johns Hopkins University, where he served in that role until his retirement in 1965.

Wolfers' two most known works are Britain and France Between Two Wars (1940), a study of two foreign policies during the interwar period, and Discord and Collaboration: Essays on International Politics (1962), a collection of papers on international relations theory.

== Early life and education ==
Arnold Oskar Wolfers (the spelling of the middle name later changed to Oscar) was born on June 14, 1892, in St. Gallen, Switzerland, to parents Otto Gustav Wolfers (1860–1945) and the former Clara Eugenie Hirschfeld (1869–1950). His father was a New York merchant who emigrated and became a naturalized Swiss citizen in 1905, while his mother was from a Jewish family in St. Gallen. Arnold grew up in St. Gallen and attended the gymnasium secondary school there, gaining his Abitur qualification.

Wolfers studied law at the University of Lausanne, the Ludwig-Maximilians-Universität München, and the Friedrich Wilhelm University of Berlin beginning in 1912, gaining a certificate (Zeugnis) from the last of these. He served as a first lieutenant in the infantry of the Swiss Army, with some of the service taking place from May 1914 to March 1915, part of which included Switzerland's maintaining a state of armed neutrality during World War I. He first began studying at the University of Zurich in the summer of 1915. He graduated summa cum laude from there with a J.U.D. degree, in both civil and church law, in April 1917.

Admitted to the bar in Switzerland in 1917, Wolfers practiced law in St. Gallen from 1917 to 1919. His observing of the war, and of the difficulties the Geneva-based League of Nations faced in the aftermath of the war, enhanced his natural Swiss skepticism and led him towards a conservative view regarding the ability of countries to avoid armed conflict. On the other hand, his Swiss background did provide to him an example of how a multi-lingual federation of cantons could prosper.

In 1918, Wolfers married Doris Emmy Forrer. She was the daughter of the Swiss politician Robert Forrer, who as a member of the Free Democratic Party of Switzerland from St. Gallen had been elected to the National Council in the 1908 Swiss federal election, retaining that seat until 1924 and chairing the radical-democratic group (1918–1924). She studied art, attending the École des Beaux-Arts in Geneva as well as the University of Geneva, and spent a year at the Academy of Fine Arts, Munich during the early stages of World War I.

Wolfers studied economics and political science at the Universities of Zurich and Berlin from 1920 to 1924, with his study at the University of Zurich concluding with a certificate in April 1920. He received a Ph.D. from the University of Giessen in Germany in 1924. During this time, Wolfers' abilities with languages allowed him to act as an interpreter in some situations. He first traveled to the United States in 1924 and delivered lectures to various audiences.

== Academic career in Germany ==
By one later account, Wolfers emigrated to Germany following the conclusion of World War I, while another had him living in Germany starting in 1921. Contemporary newspaper stories published in the United States portray Wolfers as a Swiss citizen through at least 1926. In 1933, stories describe him as Swiss-German or a native Swiss and naturalized German. But in 1940 he is described as having been a Swiss before being naturalized as an American, something that a later historical account also states.

From 1924 to 1930, Wolfers was a lecturer in political science at the Deutsche Hochschule für Politik (Institute of Politics) in Berlin. Headed by Ernst Jaeckh, it was considered Berlin's best school for the study of political behavior. In 1927, he took on the additional duties of being studies supervisor. Wolfers was one of the early people in the circle around Lutheran theologian Paul Tillich, with he and Doris giving much-needed economic support to Tillich in Berlin during the hyperinflation in the Weimar Republic period. As such Wolfers might have been considered a religious socialist. The Hochschule attracted many religious socialists, who were interested in combining spiritual development with social reform in an effort to provide an attractive alternative to Marxism.

Wolfers became the director of the Hochschule für Politik from 1930 until 1933, with Jaeckh as president and chair. Wolfers and Jaeckh both gave lecture tours in America, made contacts there, and secured funding for the Hochschule's library and publications from the Carnegie Endowment for International Peace and the Rockefeller Foundation. Two endowed visiting lectureships were sponsored by Carnegie, one of which would be held by Hajo Holborn. In a period where there was considerable student unrest, Wolfers led popular classroom discussion sessions regarding the state of world affairs.

Between 1929 and 1933, Wolfers was a privatdozent (roughly, assistant professor) in economics at the University of Berlin. He was active in the International Student Service and presided over their annual conference in 1931, held in the midst of the Great Depression, at Mount Holyoke College in the United States. In his address before them, Wolfers urged more financial help from Great Britain and the United States to Continental Europe: "What Europe needs is not general declarations for peace and cooperation – people are getting sick of them. We need proposals to help overcome concrete pressing difficulties."

Wolfers, like other German academics, witnessed first-hand the demise of the Weimar Republic and the rise to power of the Nazi Party. While some of the academics perceived immediately the reality of the Nazis, Wolfers, along with Jaeckh, did not. Wolfers had a belief in the great man theory, extended to the role of great nations, and was drawn to the notion of spectacular actions in international relations; as such he found some Nazi rhetoric appealing. In this manner Wolfers tended to be in agreement with some of the foreign policy objectives of the Nazi regime, especially in the East, thinking that those objectives could play a part in restoring the European balance of power. As for other aspects of the Nazis, Wolfers failed to comprehend the amount of racism and authoritarianism essential to Nazi ideology. In a November 1932 article in the journal International Affairs, Wolfers prophesied that "Hitler, with all his anti-democratic tendencies, is caught by the fact that he leads a mass movement... He may therefore become, against his own original programme, a force making for democracy. ... The further we go, the more this character of his movement as a safeguard against social reaction is likely to come to the fore."

Hitler seized control in the Machtergreifung in January 1933. At some point, Wolfers, a "half-Jew" (Halbjude) in the language of the Third Reich, was classified as "undesirable" (unerwünscht) by the new regime. In late April 1933, Wolfers was offered a position as a visiting professor of international relations at Yale University, and in late May, the appointment was publicly announced by Yale, with Wolfers being assigned to Yale's graduate school, where he was to lecture on world economics and European governments. Also in May, Wolfers served as general rapporteur to that year's International Studies Conference in London.

== Master at Yale ==
Wolfers traveled to the United States on the SS Albert Ballin, arriving on August 11, 1933. He commented that Europeans generally felt threatened by U.S. monetary policy, but that people in Germany were sympathetic to U.S. leadership in trying to overcome the Depression.

In a November 1933 address at Yale, Wolfers described Hitler as saying that Germany would return to the League of Nations if reparations-based discrimination against her ended and that France and Germany could be allied against the Bolshevik threat from the east. Wolfers added, "Hitler's policy is not only an outgrowth of dire necessity. His party's emphasis is on domestic affairs. The 'militant' energies of Germany's soldier-like citizens are at last finding a field of action at home that satisfies all needs." In a February 1934 speech before the Foreign Policy Association in New York, Wolfers said, "The cause of present unrest is France's extravagant demands. ... Germany has lost her territorial cohesion; she has been forced to live in conflict with her Eastern neighbors, and is deprived of the most meager of self-defense." In 1934 the German embassy in Washington expressed satisfaction with the contents of Wolfers' lectures in the United States.

The contradictions inherent in the Nazi government's classification of Wolfers, compared to the Nazis' and Wolfers' somewhat complimentary views of each other at this time, have been noted by the German political scientist Rainer Eisfeld. Wolfers destroyed his personal and work files several times over the course of his career and thus it is difficult to know if his leaving Germany was for academic or political reasons or exactly what his thinking was at the time.

Intellectually, Wolfers' early work on international politics and economics was influenced by European conflicts and their effect upon the world and revealed something of a Realpolitik point of view. However he was not as heavily devoted to this perspective as was his colleague Nicholas J. Spykman. In terms of economics, Wolfers spoke somewhat favorably of New Deal initiatives such as the National Recovery Administration that sought to manage some competitive forces.

In 1935, Wolfers was named as professor of international relations at Yale. In taking the position, Wolfers was essentially proclaiming his lack of desire to return to Germany under Nazi rule. As part of gaining the position, Wolfers received an honorary A.M. from Yale in 1935, a standard practice at Yale when granting full professorships to scholars who did not previously have a Yale degree.

Also in 1935, Wolfers was appointed master of Pierson College at Yale, succeeding Alan Valentine. The college system had just been created at Yale two years earlier and masterships were sought after by faculty for the extra stipend and larger living environment they allotted. A master was expected to provide a civilizing influence to the resident students and much of that role was filled by Doris Wolfers. She decorated with eighteenth century Swiss furniture, played the host with enthusiasm, and together the couple made the Master's House at Pierson a center for entertaining on the campus second only to the house of the president of the university. When diplomats visited the campus, it was the Wolferses who provided the entertainment. The couple collected art and in 1936 loaned some of their modern art to an exhibit at the Yale Gallery of the Fine Arts. Doris Wolfers became a frequent attendee or patroness at tea dances and other events to celebrate debutantes. He would accompany her to some university dances. One former Yale undergraduate later said that he had lived in Pierson and that as head of the hall, Wolfers had been wiser and more useful regarding the practical issues of foreign policy than any of the faculty in political science. Veterans returning after the war would express how much they had missed Doris.

Another development in 1935 was that the Yale Institute of International Studies was created, with Wolfers as one of three founding members along with Frederick S. Dunn and Nicholas J. Spykman with Spykman as the first director. The new entity sought to use a "realistic" perspective to produce scholarly but useful research that would be useful to government decision makers. Wolfers was one of the senior academics who gave both the institute and Yale as a whole gravitas in the area and the nickname of the "Power School". The members of the institute launched a weekly seminar called "Where Is the World Going?" at which various current issues would be discussed, and from this Wolfers developed small study groups to address problems sent from the U.S. Department of State. Wolfers traveled to the State Department in Washington frequently and also discussed these matters with his friend and Yale alumnus Dean Acheson. Wolfers gained campus renown for his lectures on global interests and strategy.

Politically, Wolfers styled himself a "Tory-Liberal", perhaps making reference to the Tory Liberal coalition in Britain of that time. Wolfers had a distinctive image on campus: tall and well-dressed with an aristocratic demeanor and a crisp voice that rotated between people in conversation "rather like a searchlight" in the words of one observer.

Whatever appeal the Nazis had held for Wolfers had ended by the conclusion of the 1930s, and in 1939, Wolfers was naturalized as an American citizen. His 1940 book Britain and France Between Two Wars, a study of the foreign policies of the two countries in the interwar period, became influential. An assessment in The New York Times Book Review by Edgar Packard Dean said that the book was a "substantial piece of work" and that Wolfers handled his descriptions with "extraordinary impartiality" but that his analysis of French policy was stronger than of British policy. Another review in the same publication referred to Britain and France Between Two Wars as "a most excellent and carefully documented study" by an "eminent Swiss scholar".

== World War II involvements ==
Wolfers actively assisted the U.S. war effort during World War II. From 1942 to 1944 he served as a special advisor and lecturer at the School of Military Government in Charlottesville, Virginia, where he conveyed his knowledge of Germany's society and government to those taking training courses to become part of a future occupying force. He served as an expert consultant to the Office of Provost Marshal General, also from 1942 to 1944. He was also a consultant to the Office of Strategic Services (OSS) in 1944 and 1945.

The masters at Yale served as contact points for recruiting appropriate students into the intelligence services, and according to the historian Robin Winks, none did so more than Wolfers, who made excellent use of his connections in Washington through the Yale Institute of International Studies. Overall a disproportionate number of intelligence workers came from Pierson College; in addition to Wolfers, other Pierson fellows who did recruiting included Wallace Notestein and C. Bradford Welles. Pierson College residents who later became intelligence figures included James Jesus Angleton, who often spent time in Wolfers' living room listening to poets such as Robert Frost that Wolfers brought in to read. Other attendees to these sessions included a future U.S. Poet Laureate, Reed Whittemore. Wolfers liked the young Angleton and kept in touch with him in subsequent years. Another protégé of Wolfers was Robert I. Blum, who became one of the early core members of the X-2 Counter Espionage Branch of the OSS, which provided liaison with the British in the exploitation of Ultra signals intelligence.

Wolfers had worked on a study of American diplomatic communications, including telecommunications and codes and ciphers. He thus became one of the few people to have a professional-level interest in intelligence matters before the war. In addition, Anita Forrer, Doris's sister, became an OSS agent and conducted secret and dangerous operations in Switzerland on behalf of Allen Dulles. Before that, she had been a correspondent of poet Rainer Maria Rilke.

In June 1944, Wolfers was among a group of ten prominent Protestant clergy and laymen organized by the Commission on a Just and Durable Peace who issued a signed statement advocating a way of dealing with Germany after war. The statement said that Germany should not be left economically destitute or subjected to excessive reparations, as "an impoverished Germany will continue to be a menace to the peace of the world," and that punishment for German extermination campaigns against Jews and war crimes against those in occupied territories should be limited to those responsible and not extended to those just carrying out orders. A month after V-E Day, Wolfers had a letter published wherein he remarked upon "the shocking revelations" of Nazi concentration camps but still recommended "stern but humane rules" for directing the future of the German people.

== Later Yale years ==
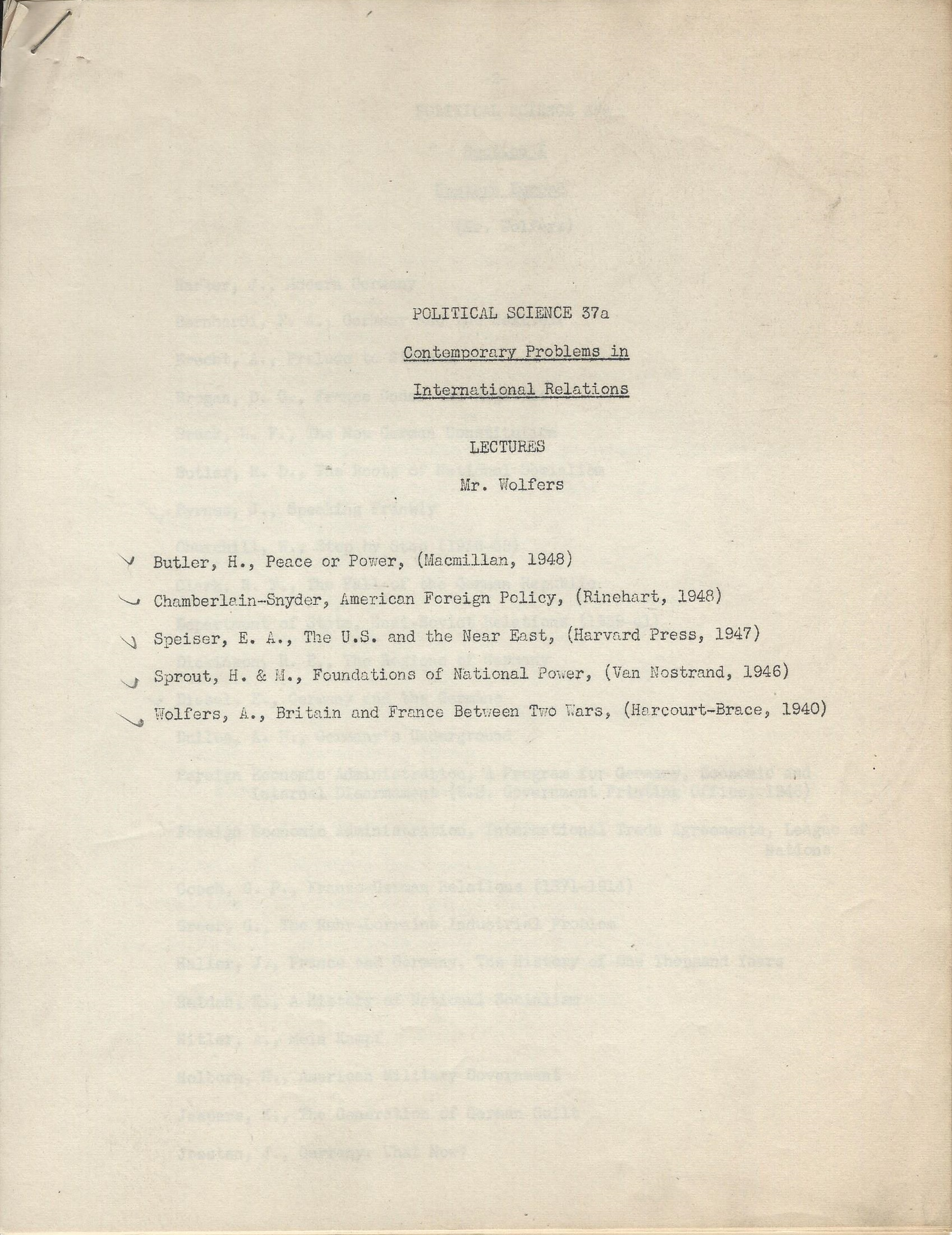
Reading list for Wolfers' "Contemporary Problems in International Relations" political science course, Fall 1948

Wolfers was one of the contributors to Bernard Brodie's landmark 1946 volume The Absolute Weapon: Atomic Power and World Order, which focused on the effect of the new atomic bomb on U.S.-Soviet relations. He worked with Basil Duke Henning, the master of Saybrook College, on a study of what Soviet leaders would judge American foreign policy options to be if they used the European press for their information. Wolfers continued to serve as a recruiter for the Central Intelligence Agency when it was formed after the war. He was a strong influence on John A. McCone, who later became Director of Central Intelligence (1961–65).

A distinguishing feature of Wolfers' career was his familiarity with power and his policy-oriented focus, which assumed that academia should try to shape the policies of government. A noted American international relations academic, Kenneth W. Thompson, subsequently wrote that Wolfers, as the most policy-oriented of the Yale institute's scholars, "had an insatiable yearning for the corridors of power" and because of that may have compromised his scholarly detachment and independence. Wolfers was a member of the resident faculty of the National War College in 1947 and a member of its board of consultants from 1947 to 1951. He was a consultant to the Bureau of Educational and Cultural Affairs during 1951 and served as President of the World Peace Foundation during 1953. In 1953 he was named a member of the board of the Woodrow Wilson Foundation.

The Wolferses, who had spent summers in Switzerland in the prewar years, considered moving back to Switzerland after the war, but decided to stay in the United States. In 1947 the couple commissioned a summer home on a Naskeag Point bluff in Brooklin, Maine. Designed by Walter Gropius and The Architect's Collective, the innovative Bauhaus-influenced design incorporated a gull-wing roof and large overhangs; the adventuresome design reflected the couple's artistic nature and cosmopolitan outlook. The home was featured in House & Garden magazine in 1948 (and would be featured again in Portland Monthly Magazine in 2013).

Wolfers was named a Sterling professor of international relations in 1949, which remains Yale's highest level of academic rank. He was, as one author later stated, "a revered doyen in the field of international relations". He was also named to direct two new entities at Yale, the Division of Social Sciences and the Social Science Planning Center. He stepped down as master of Pierson College at that time; President of Yale Charles Seymour said, "I regret exceedingly that we must take from Pierson College a master who has conducted its affairs with wisdom and understanding for fourteen years." The Wolferses continued to reside in New Haven.

In 1950 and 1951, the Yale Institute of International Studies ran into conflict with a new President of Yale University, A. Whitney Griswold, who felt that scholars should conduct research as individuals rather than in cooperative groups and that the institute should do more historical, detached analysis rather than focus on current issues and recommendations on policy. Most of the institute's scholars left Yale, with many of them going to Princeton University and founding the Center of International Studies there in 1951, but Wolfers remained at Yale for several more years.

In May 1954, Wolfers attended the Conference on International Politics, sponsored by the Rockefeller Foundation and convened in Washington, D.C., which brought together Hans Morgenthau, Reinhold Niebuhr, Walter Lippmann, Paul Nitze, Kenneth W. Thompson, Kenneth Waltz, Dean Rusk, and others. The conference has since been seen as an attempt to define an international relations theory through modern realism.

== Washington Center of Foreign Policy Research ==
Wolfers left Yale in 1957, at the age of 65, but retained an emeritus title there. He was appointed director of the Washington Center of Foreign Policy Research at Johns Hopkins University. This was a new institute founded by Paul Nitze, who wanted to create a center within the School of Advanced International Studies that would join academics and policymakers. Unsettled by some feuding going on at Yale regarding the future of international relations study there, Wolfers was willing to leave Yale and move to Washington to take on the new position.

At the Washington Center, Wolfers brought academics and government officials together to discuss national security policy. Nitze would later say that Wolfers had been an asset in running discussions wherein members were encouraged to bring forth their ideas and defend them while others kept an open mind. Wolfers was willing to question prevailing academic opinions and ideologies and, in Nitze's words, "brought a wind of fresh air to what had been a fairly stodgy and opinionated group. He was a joy to work with." Wolfers' own thoughts at the time still revolved around classical balance of power relationships. Overall, the directorship of Wolfers added an academic prestige to the center that it had previously not had.

Wolfers consulted for the Institute for Defense Analyses in 1960 and 1961 and was a consultant to the State Department from 1960 on. He also consulted for the U.S. Department of the Army.

A 1962 book from Wolfers, Discord and Collaboration: Essays on International Politics, presented sixteen essays on international relations theory, most of which had already been published in some form but some of which were completely new. Many of the essays had been influential when first published, and the book came to be viewed as a classic. In a foreword, Reinhold Niebuhr said that Wolfers was more of political philosopher than a political scientist who nonetheless sought empirical verification of his theories and suppositions.

Wolfers belonged to a number of academic organizations and clubs, including the International Institute for Strategic Studies (for which he was a member of the international advisory council), the American Political Science Association, the Council on Foreign Relations, the Century Association, and the Cosmos Club.

== Final years ==
Wolfers retired from the Washington Center of Foreign Policy Research in 1965 but remained affiliated to it with the status of special adviser. Wolfers destroyed his files on three occasions when undergoing changes of position, in 1949, 1957, and 1966.

Beginning in 1958, the Wolferses spent more time at their Maine house, even though he officially still lived in Washington. They entertained in Maine often, bringing in guests of all different political persuasions and artistic endeavors.

Encouraged by the Wolferses' acquaintance Carl Jung, who thought that Doris had a greater creative instinct than her role as Arnold's secretary and amanuensis made use of, she had resumed her career as an artist in the early-to-mid 1950s. She specialized in embroidery-based textual montages. Beginning in 1960, she had her work exhibited at galleries in Washington, New York, Rhode Island, and Maine.

Wolfers died on July 16, 1968, in a hospital in Blue Hill, Maine. Doris focused even more on her artistic endeavors after he was gone and would live until 1987.

== Awards and honors ==
Wolfers received an honorary Litt.D. from Mount Holyoke College in 1934. He had a long relationship with that school, including giving the Founder's Day address in 1933, conducting public assemblies in 1941, and delivering a commencement address in 1948. Wolfers was also granted an honorary LL.D. from the University of Rochester in 1945.

An endowed chair, the Arnold Wolfers Professor of Political Science, was created at Yale following Wolfers' death, funded by a $600,000 gift from Arthur K. Watson of IBM. Watson's gift was subsequently increased to $1 million.

== Legacy ==
Two Festschrift volumes were published in tribute to Wolfers. The first, Foreign Policy in the Sixties: The Issues and the Instruments: Essays in Honor of Arnold Wolfers, edited by Roger Hilsman and Robert C. Good, came out in 1965 during Wolfers' lifetime. It largely featured contributions from his former students, including ones from Raymond L. Garthoff, Laurence W. Martin, Lucian W. Pye, W. Howard Wriggins, Ernest W. Lefever, and the editors. The second, Discord and Collaboration in a New Europe: Essays in Honor of Arnold Wolfers, edited by Douglas T. Stuart and Stephen F. Szabo, came out in 1994 based on a 1992 conference at Dickinson College. It featured contributions from Martin again, Catherine McArdle Kelleher, Vojtech Mastny, and others, as well as the editors.

In terms of international relations theory, the editors of the second Festschrift characterize Wolfers as "the reluctant realist". Wolfers could be categorized as belonging to "progressive realists", figures who often shared legal training, left-leaning traits in their thinking, and institutionally reformist goals. Wolfers' focus on morality and ethics in international relations, which he viewed as something that could transcend demands for security depending upon circumstances, is also unusual for a realist. Martin believes Wolfers "swam against the tide" within the realist school, taking "a middle line that makes him seem in retrospect a pioneer revisionist of realism." But Wolfers did not subscribe to alternative explanations for international relations, such as behaviorism or quantification, instead preferring to rely upon, as he said, "history, personal experience, introspection, common sense and the gift of logical reason".

The progressive, democratic reputation that the Deutsche Hochschule für Politik enjoyed for decades became diminished as a result of scholarly research performed in the latter part of the twentieth century which showed that the Hochschule's relationship with the Nazi Party was not the one of pure opposition that had been portrayed. With those findings, Wolfers' reputation in connection to his role there suffered somewhat as well. By one account, it took six decades for any of Wolfers' former students in the United States to concede that Wolfers, even after having left Germany and finding a secure position at Yale, had still during the 1930s shown some ideological sympathies with the Nazi regime.

Two of Wolfers' formulations have often been repeated. The first provides a metaphor for one model of who the participants are in international relations: states-as-actors behaving as billiard balls that collide with one another. The second provides two components for the notion of national security; Wolfers wrote that "security, in an objective sense, measures the absence of threats to acquired values, in a subjective sense, the absence of fear that such values will be attacked."

Wolfers found composition difficult and his written output was small, with Britain and France Between Two Wars and Discord and Collaboration being his two major works. Much of his influence lay in how he brought people and discussions together in productive ways and bridged gaps between theory and practice. But what Wolfers did write found an audience; by 1994, Discord and Collaboration was in its eighth printing, twenty-five years after his death. In the introduction to the second Festschrift, Douglas T. Stuart wrote, "The book stands the test of time for two reasons. First, the author addresses enduring aspects of international relations and offers insightful recommendations about the formulation and execution of foreign policy. Second, Wolfers's writings are anchored in a sophisticated theory of situational ethics that is valid for any historical period, but that is arguably more relevant today than it was when Wolfers was writing."

Nevertheless, Wolfers' name is often not remembered as well as it might. In a 2008 interview, Robert Jervis, the Adlai E. Stevenson Professor of International Politics at Columbia University, listed international relations scholars who had influenced him, and he concluded by saying, "then there is one scholar who's not as well known as he should be: Arnold Wolfers, who was I think the most sophisticated, subtle, and well-grounded of the early generation of Realists." In his 2011 book, political theorist William E. Scheuerman posits three "towering figures" of mid-twentieth century classical realism – E. H. Carr, Hans J. Morgenthau, Reinhold Niebuhr – and next includes Wolfers, along with John H. Herz and Frederick L. Schuman, in a group of "prominent postwar US political scientists, relatively neglected today but widely respected at mid century".

On the other hand, in a 2011 remark the British international relations scholar Michael Cox mentioned Wolfers as one of the "giants" of international relations theory, along with Hans Morgenthau, Paul Nitze, William T. R. Fox, and Reinhold Niebuhr. In the 2011 Encyclopedia of Power, Douglas T. Stuart wrote that "More than 40 years after his death, Arnold Wolfers remains one of the most influential experts in the field of international relations."

== Published works ==
- Die Verwaltungsorgane der Aktiengesellschaft nach schweizerischem Recht unter besonderer Berücksichtigung des Verhältnisses von Verwaltungsrat und Direktion (Sauerländer, 1917) (Zürcher Beiträge zur Rechtswissenschaft 66).
- Die Aufrichtung der Kapitalherrschaft in der abendländischen Geschichte (1924, thesis).
- "Über monopolistische und nichtmonopolistische Wirtschaftsverbände", Archiv für Sozialwissenschaften und Sozialpolitik 59 (1928), 291–321.
- "Ueberproduktion, fixe Kosten und Kartellierung", Archiv für Sozialwissenschaften und Sozialpolitik 60 (1928), 382–395.
- Amerikanische und deutsche Löhne: eine Untersuchung über die Ursachen des hohen Lohnstandes in den Vereinigten Staaten (Julius Springer, 1930).
- Das Kartellproblem im Licht der deutschen Kartellliteratur (Duncker & Humblot, 1931).
- "Germany and Europe", Journal of the Royal Institute of International Affairs 9 (1930), 23–50.
- "The Crisis of the Democratic Régime in Germany", International Affairs 11 (1932), 757–783.
- Britain and France Between Two Wars: Conflicting Strategies of Peace Since Versailles (Harcourt, Brace and Co., 1940); revised edition (W. W. Norton, 1966)
- The Absolute Weapon: Atomic Power and World Order (Harcourt Brace, 1946) [co-author with Bernard Brodie, Frederick Sherwood Dunn, William T. R. Fox, Percy Ellwood Corbett]
- The Anglo-American Tradition in Foreign Affairs (Yale University Press, 1956) [co-editor with Laurence W. Martin]
- Alliance Policy in the Cold War (Johns Hopkins University Press, 1959) [editor]
- Developments in Military Technology and Their Impact on United States Strategy and Foreign Policy (Washington Center of Foreign Policy Research for U.S. Senate Foreign Relations Committee, 1959) [co-author with Paul Nitze and James E. King]
- Discord and Collaboration: Essays on International Politics (Johns Hopkins University Press, 1962)

== Bibliography ==
- Eisfeld, Rainer (2014). "From the Berlin Political Studies Institute to Columbia and Yale: Ernest Jaeckh and Arnold Wolfers". In Rösch, Felix (ed.). Émigré Scholars and the Genesis of International Relations: A European Discipline in America?. Basingstoke, Hampshire: Palgrave Macmillan. pp. 113–131.
- Guilhot, Nicolas (2011). "The Realist Gambit: Postwar American Political Science and the Birth of IR Theory". In Guilhot, Nicolas (ed.). The Invention of International Relations Theory: Realism, the Rockefeller Foundation, and the 1954 Conference on Theory. New York: Columbia University Press. pp. 128–161.
- Haslam, Jonathan (2002). No Virtue Like Necessity: Realist Thought in International Relations Since Machiavelli. New Haven: Yale University Press.
- Hilsman, Roger; Good, Robert C. (1965). "Introduction". In Hilsman, Roger; Good, Robert C. (eds.). Foreign Policy in the Sixties: The Issues and the Instruments: Essays in Honor of Arnold Wolfers. Baltimore: The Johns Hopkins Press. pp. ix–xii.
- Kaplan, Fred (1983). The Wizards of Armageddon. Stanford, California: Stanford University Press.
- Korenblat, Steven D. (September 2006). "A School for the Republic? Cosmopolitans and Their Enemies at the Deutsche Hochschule Für Politik, 1920–1933". Central European History. 39 (3): 394–430. doi:10.1017/S0008938906000148. S2CID 144221659.
- Martin, Laurence (1994). "Arnold Wolfers and the Anglo-American Tradition". In Stuart, Douglas T.; Szabo, Stephen F. (eds.). Discord and Collaboration in a New Europe: Essays in Honor of Arnold Wolfers. Washington, D.C.: Foreign Policy Institute, Paul H. Nitze School of Advanced International Studies, Johns Hopkins University. pp. 11–16.
- Nitze, Paul H. (1994). "Foreword". In Stuart, Douglas T.; Szabo, Stephen F. (eds.). Discord and Collaboration in a New Europe: Essays in Honor of Arnold Wolfers. Washington, D.C.: Foreign Policy Institute, Paul H. Nitze School of Advanced International Studies, Johns Hopkins University. pp. v–vi.
- Parmar, Inderjeet (2011). "American Hegemony, the Rockefeller Foundation, and the Rise of Academic International Relations in the United States". In Guilhot, Nicolas (ed.). The Invention of International Relations Theory: Realism, the Rockefeller Foundation, and the 1954 Conference on Theory. New York: Columbia University Press. pp. 182–209.
- Scheuerman, William E. (2011). The Realist Case for Global Reform. Cambridge: Polity Press.
- Stuart, Douglas T. (1994). "Discord and Collaboration: Enduring Insights of Arnold Wolfers". In Stuart, Douglas T.; Szabo, Stephen F. (eds.). Discord and Collaboration in a New Europe: Essays in Honor of Arnold Wolfers. Washington, D.C.: Foreign Policy Institute, Paul H. Nitze School of Advanced International Studies, Johns Hopkins University. pp. 3–10.
- Szabo, Stephen F. (1994). "Conclusion: Wolfers and Europe Today". In Stuart, Douglas T.; Szabo, Stephen F. (eds.). Discord and Collaboration in a New Europe: Essays in Honor of Arnold Wolfers. Washington, D.C.: Foreign Policy Institute, Paul H. Nitze School of Advanced International Studies, Johns Hopkins University. pp. 239–250.
- Who's Who in America 1966–1967 (34th ed.). Chicago: Marquis Who's Who. 1966.
- Williams, Robert E. Jr. (Summer 2012). "Review: The Invention of International Relations Theory: Realism, the Rockefeller Foundation, and the 1954 Conference on Theory, Nicolas Guilhot, ed". Ethics & International Affairs. 26 (2): 284–286. doi:10.1017/S0892679412000366. S2CID 145419172.
- Winks, Robin W. (1987). Cloak & Gown: Scholars in the Secret War, 1939–1961. New York: William Morrow and Company.
