= Center of International Studies =

Former research center at Princeton University

Coordinates: 40.3483°N 74.6548°W

The Center of International Studies (CIS) was a research center that was part of Princeton University's Woodrow Wilson School of Public and International Affairs in Princeton, New Jersey. It was founded in 1951 by six scholars who came to Princeton from Yale Institute of International Studies under the leadership of the center's first director, Frederick S. Dunn. By 1999, its stated mission was to "promote world peace and mutual understanding among nations by supporting scholarship in international relations and national development" and to "support analysis of abiding questions in international security and political economy". In 2003, the center was merged with the university's regional studies programs to form the considerably larger Princeton Institute for International and Regional Studies.

== Origins ==
The Yale Institute of International Studies had existed since 1935, but during 1950–51, ran into a conflict with the new President of Yale University, A. Whitney Griswold, who felt that scholars should conduct research as individuals rather than in cooperative groups and who thought that the institute should do more historical, detached analysis rather than focus on current issues and recommendations on policy. In addition there was some personal animosity involved, related to Griswold believing that institute members had argued against his receiving tenure.

In April 1951, the longtime director of the Yale institute, Frederick Sherwood Dunn (who was a Princeton alumnus), together with five of his political science colleagues – Percy Corbett, Gabriel Almond, Klaus Knorr, William Kaufmann, and Bernard C. Cohen – all left Yale and came to Princeton. With the goal of strengthening international studies within the Woodrow Wilson School of Public and International Affairs, the Center of International Studies was thus created. It was initially funded by donations, including a grant from the Rockefeller Foundation, which had also sponsored the Yale institute. It also received a substantial gift from the Milbank Memorial Fund. Dunn became the first director of the new body. The President of Princeton University, Harold W. Dodds, said that the new center would focus its attentions on the problems of foreign policy and conflicting national policies, would work with the U.S. State Department and other governmental agencies, and declared that, "Basic research in the foreign policies and behavior of nations is just as essential as research in physical science and engineering if the United States is to achieve security and avoid catastrophic total war."

The news of the shift from Yale to Princeton made the front page of The New York Times. Dodds used a metaphor from American football to summarize the events: "Yale fumbled and Princeton recovered the ball." The new center became known as the continuation of the old Yale institute, and terms such as "migration" or "moved" have been used. One government publication later termed the center a "reincarnation".

== Structure and work ==
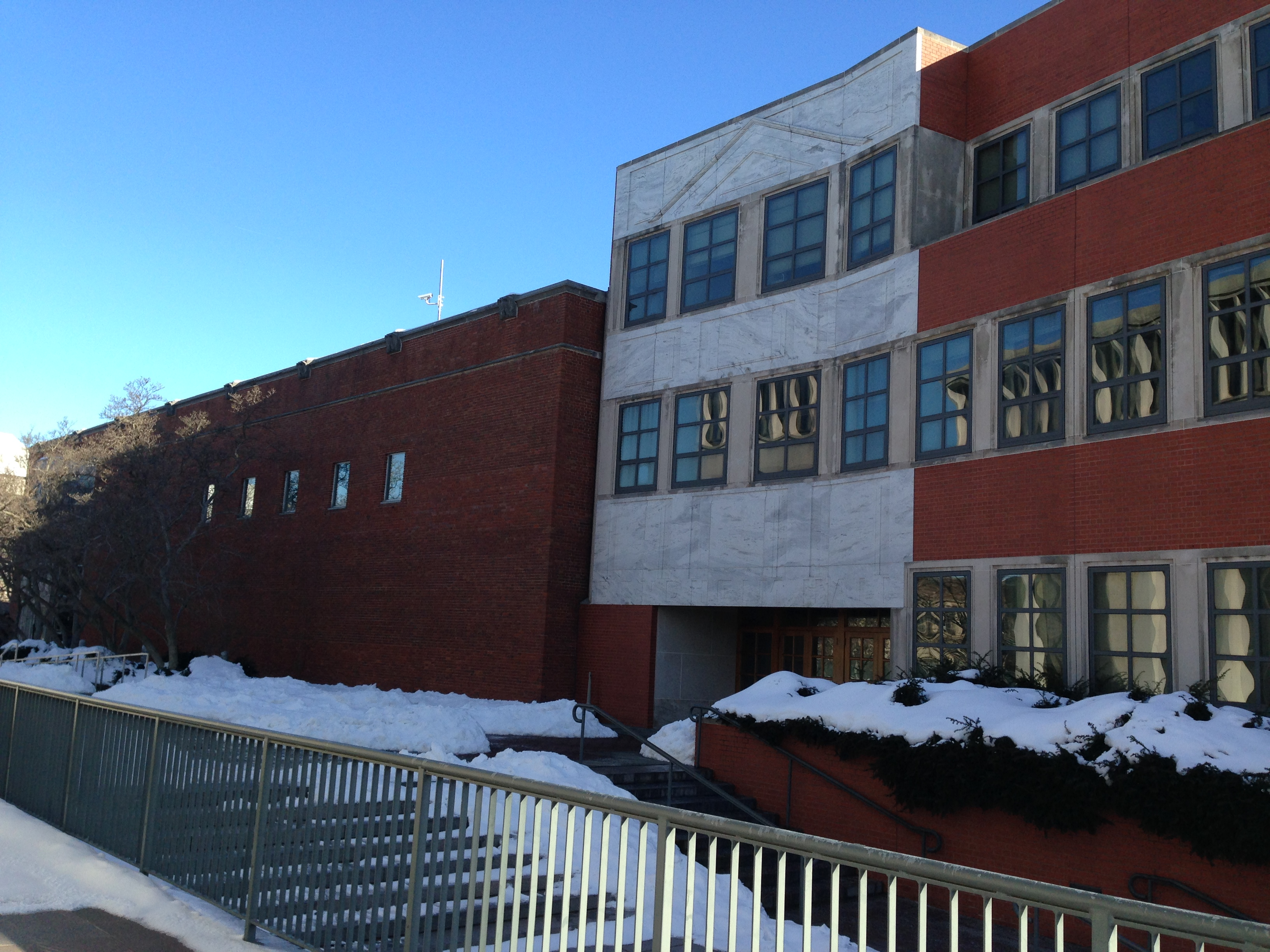
The Center of International Studies was housed in Wilson (later renamed Corwin) Hall (left) during the 1950s through 1980s, and then in Bendheim Hall (center) during the 1990s and 2000s.

The center's structure had a faculty committee overseeing it, chaired by Dunn, that included some of Princeton's well-known historians; research associates, initially consisting largely of those who had come over from Yale; and visiting fellows, of whom many were postdoctoral researchers.

In its early years, the official statement of purpose for the center read:

The program of the Center of International Studies falls into two principal divisions. The first is concerned with the development of methods an analysis appropriate to the study of international relations and foreign policy. The second is research in specific problems of world politics with special reference to the foreign policy of the United States.

The creation of the center was part of a group of such research facilities that came into being in the aftermath of World War II to pursue international security studies. Another was Columbia University's Institute of War and Peace Studies, also created in 1951 and whose founding director, William T. R. Fox, had been associate director of the Yale Institute of International Studies but had departed a year earlier. Indeed, both Fox and his wife, Annette Baker Fox, had also been listed as coming to the Center of International Studies as part-time research associates, leading to some accounts increasing the total number coming to Princeton from Yale from six to seven or eight. She did work for the center during 1951–57 while he was there only during 1951–52. More important was the influence he had at Columbia; some of the Princeton center's research scholars who were hired later in the early 1950s, such as Warner R. Schilling and Roger Hilsman, would later end up at the Columbia institute.

Integration with the existing political science department at Princeton was not always smooth, for Dodds had not apprised them in advance of the newcomers. Due to this Almond fairly soon departed, and Kaufman and Cohen left later in the decade as well.

Subsequent directors of the Center of International Studies were Knorr, who served in the position from 1960 to 1968, and history professor Cyril E. Black, from 1968 to 1985. Henry Bienen served as director until 1992, when John Waterbury took over. He served in that role until around 1997–98, when Michael W. Doyle took it over until 2001. Aaron Friedberg served as acting director, and then director, of the center, culminating in 2002–03. Continued funding from the center came from a variety of Princeton sources, outside grants from foundations, and from research-related federal agencies. Beginning in 1970, a grant from the Fund for Peace sponsored the Compton fellowship, named after a Princeton student killed in World War II and whose parents created the fund.

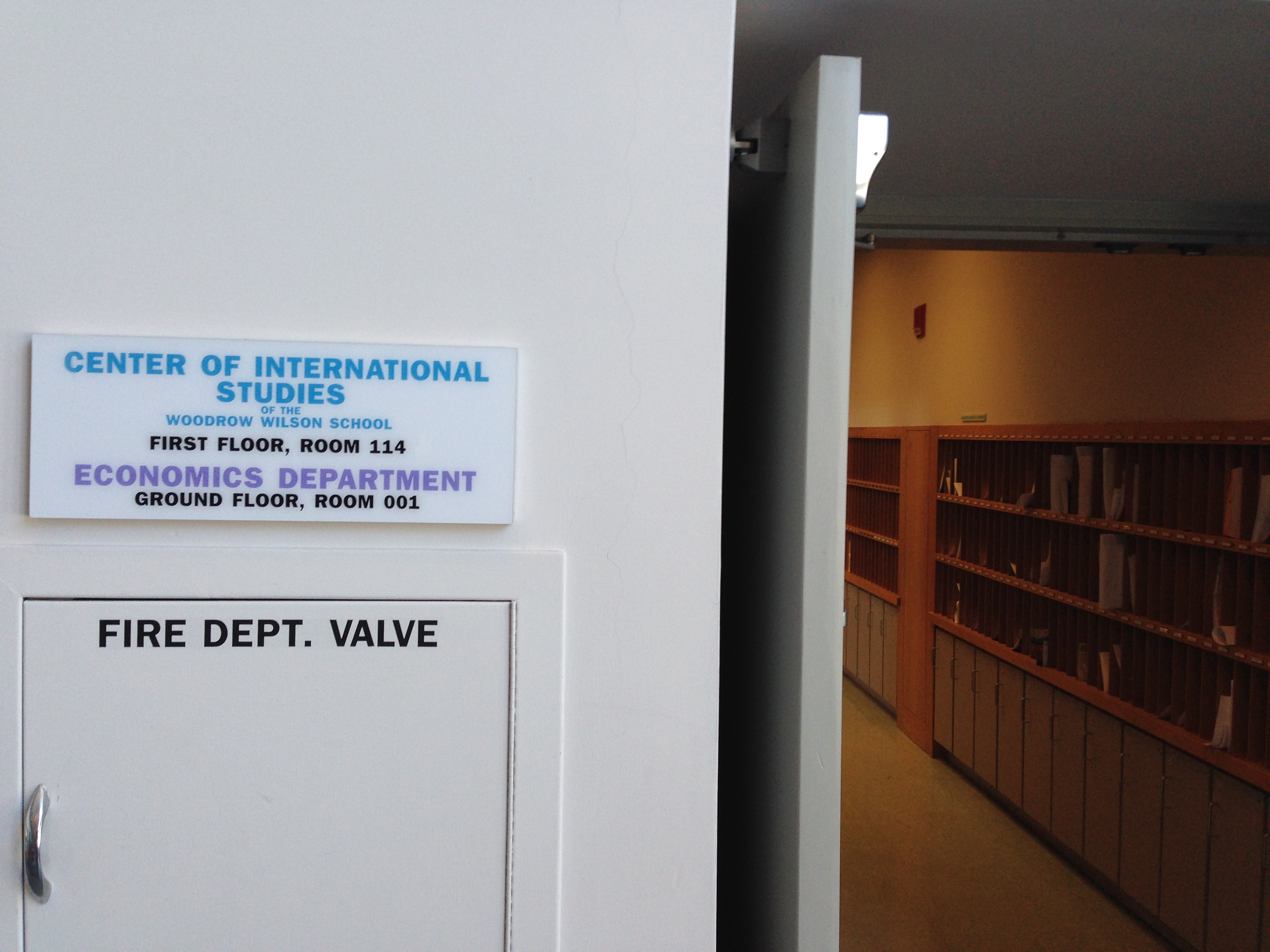
Signage for the center could still be seen some years after the end of its existence.

The center also took over from the Yale institute the sponsorship of the quarterly academic journal World Politics. Dunn served as chair of its editorial board for a period and Knorr served as it editor for a decade. By 1975, it was ranked the highest in quality of over sixty journals in its field.

Both the Yale Institute and the Princeton Center have been considered bastions of international relations realism although influential academic organizer Kenneth W. Thompson saw the Princeton center as a growing home for behaviorism. As the RAND Corporation, formed around the same time, took the lead in security studies, the center helped forge a bridge between RAND and academia. Over time, the center's work developed into a multidisciplinary approach that used cross-cultural studies, and its researchers included not just political scientists but also historians, economists, and sociologists.

In addition to the directors, other scholars of note to work in the center included Richard A. Falk. Black and Falk edited a multi-volume study, The Future of the International Legal Order, beginning in 1969, that combined the efforts of over three dozen scholars from nearly as many institutions; it would win an award from the American Society of International Law in 1973. By 1978, some 90 books had been published in connection with the center, with half coming from scholars outside of Princeton. In some cases, limited teaching responsibilities enabled the researchers to focus their efforts on producing books. The title of one book, 1960's The Politics of the Developing Areas, was responsible for spreading that term into the academic world.

By 1999, the center consisted of some sixty-five faculty associates, who belonged to several different departments within the university, and about ten visiting fellows at any given time.

== Merging ==
In 2003, the Center of International Studies was merged with the Council on Regional Studies, which had been an interdepartmental organization of regional study programs, to form the considerably larger Princeton Institute for International and Regional Studies. University President Shirley M. Tilghman said that, "This new institute will build on two long-established areas of strength at Princeton to bring an even greater global perspective to teaching and research at this University". The first director of the new institute was a Latin American studies scholar. The new institute continued to sponsor the World Politics journal.
