= Annette Baker Fox =

American international relations scholar

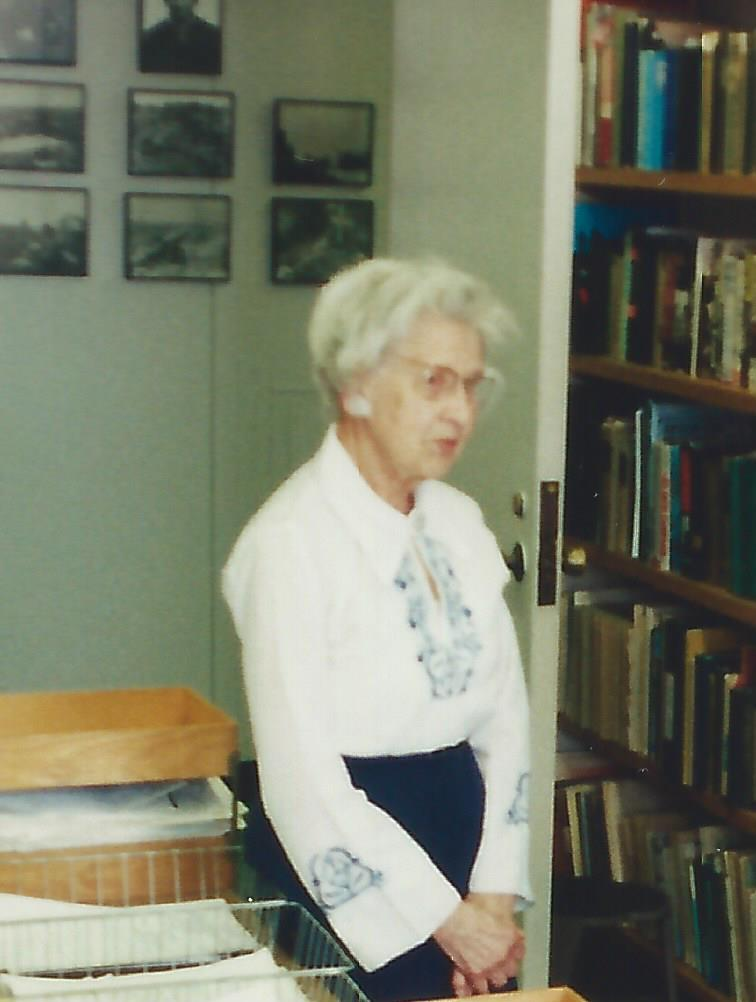
Annette Baker Fox in the offices of Columbia University's Institute of War and Peace Studies, 1995

Annette May Baker Fox (1912 – December 26, 2011) was an American international relations scholar, who spent much of her career at Columbia University's Institute of War and Peace Studies. She was a pioneer in the academic study of small powers and middle powers and the books and articles she wrote on that subject are highly regarded in the field. She was director of the institute's Canadian Studies Program from 1977 to 1984.

== Life and career ==
Annette May Baker was born and raised in Buffalo, New York. She attended the Buffalo Seminary, an all-girls preparatory school.

In 1930 she entered Wellesley College, but after two years was looking for a place with a greater research impact, and transferred to the University of Chicago, where political science was undergoing a transformation to a modern social science. She earned a B.A. there in 1934. She continued on to graduate school there, studying with leading political scientists such as Harold Lasswell and Charles Merriam. She was awarded a Ph.D. from the University of Chicago in 1941.

Meanwhile, she had met William T. R. Fox during her first year at Chicago, who was also a Ph.D. student there. They married in 1935. The couple raised two children together, both born in the 1940s.

In a two-career couple, she was what later would become known as the trailing spouse. While both were still working on their dissertations, he was an instructor at Temple University from 1936 to 1941, while she did graduate school work at Bryn Mawr College during 1936–37, then was a research assistant at the University of Pennsylvania during 1937–38 and taught at the Wharton School of the University of Pennsylvania. At Bryn Mawr, she was appointed a reader in politics during 1940–41. He taught at Princeton University from 1941 to 1943 and during 1942 she worked as a research assistant in the State and Local Government Section of the Woodrow Wilson School of Public and International Affairs at Princeton. He went to Yale University in 1943, where he became associate director of the Yale Institute of International Studies; she joined the Yale institute as a research assistant the same year. Under the influence of the institute's director Frederick S. Dunn, she switched her area of study from public administration to international relations. There she published her first book, Freedom and Welfare in the Caribbean: A Colonial Dilemma, in 1949. It examined the post-World War II move to independence and modernization by ex-colonial states and the resulting political and economic problems and conflicts.

In 1950, her husband left Yale to go to Columbia University. In 1951, she became a part-time research associate at Princeton's new Center of International Studies, which was founded by a number of scholars who had left the Yale Institute. She remained there until 1957. She then became a lecturer in international relations at Hunter College, teaching there from 1958 to 1961. She also taught at Sarah Lawrence College, serving as a visiting political scientist there in 1962.

In 1963, she joined Columbia University's Institute of War and Peace Studies as a research associate. Her husband was the founding director of the institute, which had been created in 1951. During her time there, she also lectured at Columbia's Barnard College during the years 1966–79. She became a senior lecturer at Columbia University as well, where she taught courses such as "Foreign relations of Canada and other middle powers". But Fox was known most for her research and writing.

In 1959, she published her book The Power of Small States: Diplomacy in World War II, which examined the role that small powers play in international relations by looking at how several small European countries conducted diplomacy during the war. It was a departure from the usual focus in the field on the interactions that take place between great powers. Fox looked in detail at Turkey, Spain, Norway, Sweden, and Finland, and analyzed and grouped them by the kind of security problems they faced and by the fate of their foreign policies. She developed theories as to why some such states had done better than others, such as: that geographical distance from the straight line between belligerents is helpful; and somewhat counter-intuitively, that having two great powers interested in a small state is better for it than having just one being interested. The book has been termed a "pioneering" study by several subsequent scholars as well as a "classic". In related published work, she examined the Cold War prospects of small states and the role that the United Nations could play with respect to them.

Fox's work also addressed the characteristics of middle powers, and her 1977 book, The Politics of Attraction: Four Middle Powers and the United States, discussed U.S. relations with Australia, Brazil, Canada, and Mexico. In the words of a subsequent scholar, it made her a "pioneer" in the comparative study of Australia and Canada as middle powers. The book argued that the relationships between middle powers and great powers reveal more intricate behaviors and bargaining schemes than previous literature had assumed. One reviewer praised her "careful analysis" in the work. Other scholars followed up on her work while exploring the area of Canadian and Australian experiences; the book was also used as a starting point by scholars exploring American policy towards Canada. It was one of the few works outside the circle of Brazilian scholars and Latin Americanists to examine the international relations of Brazil beyond just those with the U.S. In using the comparative method to do so, she used an approach that became more popular with the growth of cross-regional analyses.

In addition to her books, she published over thirty articles in scholarly journals. She also engaged in a number of joint authorships with her husband on academic work, including the 1967 book NATO and the Range of American Choice, which sought to identify desirable choices for the alliance that were politically feasible. As she later remarked drily, these efforts were "happily completed without the collaboration ending in divorce."

Despite the level of her scholarship, Fox suffered from building an academic career as a married woman with children in the 1940s and 1950s, when such a path was not at all the norm. She was never offered tenure or a tenure-track position. Indeed, Columbia's Department of Political Science would not have its first female tenured professor until the 1980s.

She was, however, director of the institute's Canadian Studies Program from 1977 to 1984. This program made use of a quarter-million-dollar grant from the William H. Donner Foundation for fellowships, expanded courses, and faculty exchanges.

In addition to her own works, Fox served with Richard Howard as co-translators from the French for Raymond Aron's Peace and War: A Theory of International Relations, published in 1966. She also wrote an internal history of the institute's first thirty-five years.

Anne Fox (as she was informally known) and her husband were residents of the Riverside neighborhood of Greenwich, Connecticut from 1950 on and she was active in the First Congregational Church of Old Greenwich. She was active in the League of Women Voters and as a Democrat in local politics, serving three terms on Greenwich's representative town meeting and serving on the town's charter revision committee while in her early nineties.

She died at her home in Riverside on December 26, 2011, at age 99.

== Published works ==
Books

- Freedom and Welfare in the Caribbean: A Colonial Dilemma (Harcourt Brace, 1949)
- The Power of Small States: Diplomacy in World War II (University of Chicago Press, 1959)
- NATO and the Range of American Choice (Columbia University Press, 1967) [co-author with William T. R. Fox ]
- The Politics of Attraction: Four Middle Powers and the United States (Columbia University Press, 1977)
- Canada and Transgovernmental Relations (Columbia University Press, 1976) [co-editor with Alfred O. Hero Jr. and Joseph S. Nye Jr.]

Selected articles

- "The Local Housing Authority and the Municipal Government", in Journal of Land and Public Utility Economics, Vol. 17 (1941) pp. 280–290.
- "The United Nations and Colonial Development", in International Organization, Vol. 4, No. 2 (May 1950), pp. 199–218.
- Britain and America in the Era of Total Diplomacy, Center of International Studies, Princeton University, 1952 [report, co-author with William T. R. Fox]
- "Small State Diplomacy", in Diplomacy in a Changing World (1959): pp. 339–364.
- "The Teaching of International Relations in the United States", in World Politics, Vol. 13, No. 3 (1961), pp. 339–359 [co-author with William T. R. Fox]
- "The Small States in the International System, 1919–1969", in International Journal, Vol. 24, No. 4 (Autumn 1969), pp. 751–764.
- "Canada and the United States: Their Binding Frontier", in International Organization, Vol. 28, No. 4 (Autumn 1974), pp. 999–1014 [co-author with Alfred O. Hero, Jr.]
- "The Range of Choice for Middle Powers: Australia and Canada Compared", in Australian Journal of Politics & History, Vol. 26, No. 2 (August 1980), pp. 193–203.
- "Environment and Trade: The NAFTA Case", in Political Science Quarterly, Vol. 110, No. 1 (Spring 1995), pp. 49–68.
