= Yale Institute of International Studies =

Former research institute of Yale University (1935–1951)

Coordinates: 41°18′40″N 72°55′36″W

The Yale Institute of International Studies was a research institute that was part of Yale University in New Haven, Connecticut. It was founded in 1935 and was led by directors Nicholas J. Spykman and later Frederick S. Dunn, under whom there was also an associate director, William T. R. Fox. The institute was influential in the development of international relations theory; in particular, it was considered a bastion of international relations realism. The institute came to an end in 1951 due to a conflict with the university administration. Dunn and five of his colleagues left Yale and formed a successor organization, the Center of International Studies, at Princeton University that same year.

== Origins ==
The Yale Institute of International Studies was founded in 1935 by several faculty members at Yale. Its first director was Nicholas J. Spykman, who organized the new entity, and the other founding members were Arnold Wolfers and Frederick S. Dunn. Dunn later wrote that the timing was not accidental, as the rise of Fascism in Europe during the early 1930s was clearly threatening the security of the United States. The new institute had the support of the President of Yale, Charles Seymour, and was initially funded by a five-year, $100,000 grant from the Rockefeller Foundation.

Under Spykman, the institute explored all the avenues in which research could help formulate the country's foreign policy. The goal was to investigate the historical, theoretical, and applied aspects of the international relations field. This last was especially important; unlike some other academic efforts in this area, the institute explicitly attempted to both study and influence the decisions of the present. As one of Spykman's mission statements at the time said:

The Yale Institute of International Studies was organized in 1935 for the purpose of promoting research and post-graduate training in the field of international relations. Although concerned with all aspects of this broad field, its research program is devoted primarily to studies designed to clarify contemporary problems in the foreign policy of the United States.

Members of the research staff at the institute during the 1930s included A. Whitney Griswold and George T. Davis. Spykman held the directorship until 1940, when he fell ill. He was replaced by Dunn, who held the position the remainder of the institute's span.

== Activities and influence ==
Journalist Fred Kaplan has written, "In the 1940s, there was no more exciting and stimulating place in the academic world for an international relations scholar to reside than at the Institute of International Studies at Yale." Similarly, Lucian W. Pye has written that during this time the institute became "the preeminent such center in the country."

Regarding schools of thought, the Yale Institute was considered a bastion of international relations realism. Wolfers started out in the mindset, then converted the previously idealist Spykman, and Dunn, a disillusioned former legal officer at the U.S. Department of State who had become a scholar of international law, followed suit. Under Dunn, the institute continued to focus on work that would clarify choices faced by American foreign policy and determine ways in which American power could best be deployed. This did not mean the studies should make policy themselves or attempt to settle difficult policy questions; Dunn believed that government officials had access to the most information and were in the best position to do that.

As part of its emphasis on the present, the institute sent hundreds of copies of its studies to officials in relevant areas of government, where they found a welcome audience. The institute also created a "memorandum series" of treatments of contemporary research problems; these were longer than journal articles but kept shorter than books so that they could be more easily read by time-pressed officials. Reproduced by mimeograph, some thirty-five issues of this series were made and the recipient list grew to 1,500 names.

In 1940–41 the institute was funded again by the Rockefeller Foundation, but this time for three years, to the amount of $51,500; the foundation's goal was that the institute become self-supporting after that. By then the faculty members had built up enough connections to help supply such sources.

Under Dunn, the institute had a loose, informal organization that one of its members likened to "a band of brothers". The institute began expanding its staff in 1943, adding seven permanent research associates over the next four years. A key addition was that of William T. R. Fox, who joined Yale University in 1943 and was associate director of the institute from 1943 to 1950. Dunn proved to be a significant influence on Fox, while Fox in turn became a significant influence on the institute, in part by recruiting people from the University of Chicago, the behavioralism-centered school where he had done his graduate work.

Also joining in 1943 were David N. Rowe and Percy E. Corbett. Bernard Brodie came to both Yale and the institute in 1945 and quickly became a well-known nuclear strategist. Klaus Knorr joined that year as well, and in 1947 the institute added Gabriel Almond and Frederick C. Barghoorn.

In addition to the regular staff, a dozen or so other scholars would be attached to the institute for temporary appointments to carry out particular research projects; these included Harold D. Lasswell, Robert A. Dahl, Annette Baker Fox, and Ellen Hammer. The noted historian Samuel F. Bemis was also affiliated with the institute.

At the same time the institute was created, an undergraduate international major in international relations was established at Yale, and the members of the institute often taught the courses for that major. The themes of the courses revolved around national security and war; this sometimes upset undergraduates who were interested in going into missionary work or in joining efforts towards building world peace, but it accurately reflected the realist perspective of the institute. By the mid-1940s, the number of international relations majors at Yale had increased by a factor of five, which helped justify the expansion of the faculty.

The institute was funded again in 1944 by the Rockefeller Foundation, this time for $125,000 to run over five years. Again this was augmented by funding from other sources, with Yale University undertaking the responsibility for finding such funding to the sum of $145,000 for the interval.

Many books on U.S. security policy came out of the institute, with Far East and Anglo-American relations particular areas of focus. Some of the more important such works included: Griswold, The Far Eastern Policy of the United States (1938); Davis, A Navy Second to None (1940); Wolfers, Britain and France Between Two Wars (1940); Almond, The American People and Foreign Policy (1950); and Dahl, Congress and Foreign Policy (1950). Perhaps the two most influential were Spykman's America's Strategy in World Politics: The United States and the Balance of Power (1942) and Fox's The Super-Powers: The United States, Britain, and the Soviet Union – Their Responsibility for Peace (1944), the former selling some 10,000 copies within the first three months of publication and the latter being credited with coining the term "superpower". Also quite influential was one that Brodie wrote along with Dunn, Wolfers, Corbett, and Fox, The Absolute Weapon: Atomic Power and World Order, published in 1946, which laid down the fundamentals of nuclear deterrence strategy and explored ways the A-bomb might be put under international control without idealistic notions of world government being in place. Dunn urged that books be written with clarity and be kept relatively short.

In 1948, the quarterly academic journal World Politics was founded under the auspices of the institute. Its focus was on the political processes by which governments and leaders interact when there is no central authority. It remains one of the most highly ranked journals in the international relations field well into the 2010s.

== End ==
In 1950–51, the institute ran into conflict with the new President of Yale, their former colleague A. Whitney Griswold, who felt that scholars should conduct research as individuals rather than in cooperative groups. He also thought that the institute should do more historical, detached analysis rather than focus on current issues and recommendations on policy. In the estimation of political scientist Annette Baker Fox, the creation of an institute such as the Yale one, which is separate from the usual departmental structure, "alters the making of choices by undergirding particular intellectual activities, thus changing academic priorities and who gets to rank them ... [the Yale Institute] foundered on this rock of university structure." Finally, there was some personal animosity involved, related to Griswold believing that institute members had argued against him receiving tenure. In 1949 the Rockefeller Foundation had agreed to another term of funding for the institute, $75,000 over three years, but it, like the previous grant, was dependent upon Yale University committing to raise an even greater sum on its own. Some of that funding had already been arranged with the Carnegie Corporation, but when the institute applied to the university for the balance of these additional funds, Griswold declined support.

The associate director, Fox, departed in 1950 and went to Columbia University, where he founded the Institute of War and Peace Studies. Some of the Carnegie funding followed him there.

In April 1951, Dunn (who was a Princeton alumnus), together with five of his political science colleagues – Corbett, Almond, Knorr, William Kaufmann, and Bernard C. Cohen – all left Yale and went to Princeton. With the goal of strengthening the international studies area within that university's Woodrow Wilson School of Public and International Affairs, the Center of International Studies was created. It was initially funded by donations, including a grant from the Rockefeller Foundation, which had similarly sponsored the Yale institute. Dunn became the first director of the new body.

The news of the shift from Yale to Princeton made the front page of the New York Times. The new center became known as the continuation of the old institute; one government publication later termed it a "reincarnation". The Princeton center also took over from the Yale institute the sponsorship of the World Politics journal. Pye has termed it "one of the most dramatic personnel changes in the history of political science". Or as the President of Princeton, Harold W. Dodds, put it at the time, using a metaphor from American football to summarize the events, "Yale fumbled and Princeton recovered the ball."

Of two other major figures at the Yale Institute, Brodie went to the RAND Corporation, while Wolfers stayed at Yale (but left six years later to become director of the Washington Center of Foreign Policy Research at Johns Hopkins University). The Yale political science department was left "in shambles", according to one observer; James W. Fesler was hired as chairman, and eventually the upheaval led to reforms being put into place at the department. Nor was it always smooth sailing at Princeton, for Dodds had not apprised the existing political science department there of the newcomers. Almond soon departed, and Kaufman and Cohen left later in the decade as well. Nevertheless, the center carried on, with Knorr assuming the directorship for much of the 1960s.

William T. R. Fox later noted that the Yale Institute of International Studies became the model for other international relations research entities to follow, with former colleagues at Yale leading not just the Princeton center and his institute as Columbia and the Washington Center at Johns Hopkins but also the MIT Center for International Studies as well. Overall some 600 students majored in international relations at Yale during the 1935–1951 period, and several alumni became well-known academics. A number of others went from the exposure to the institute into the State Department or into other foreign policy-related organizations, thus showing that the influence that the Yale Institute of International Studies had extended beyond academia and beyond its span.

== Key members ==
- Nicholas J. Spykman
- Frederick S. Dunn
- Arnold Wolfers
- Percy E. Corbett
- William T. R. Fox
- Bernard Brodie
- Klaus Knorr
- Gabriel Almond
