= William T. R. Fox =

Foreign policy professor and theoretician (1912-1988)

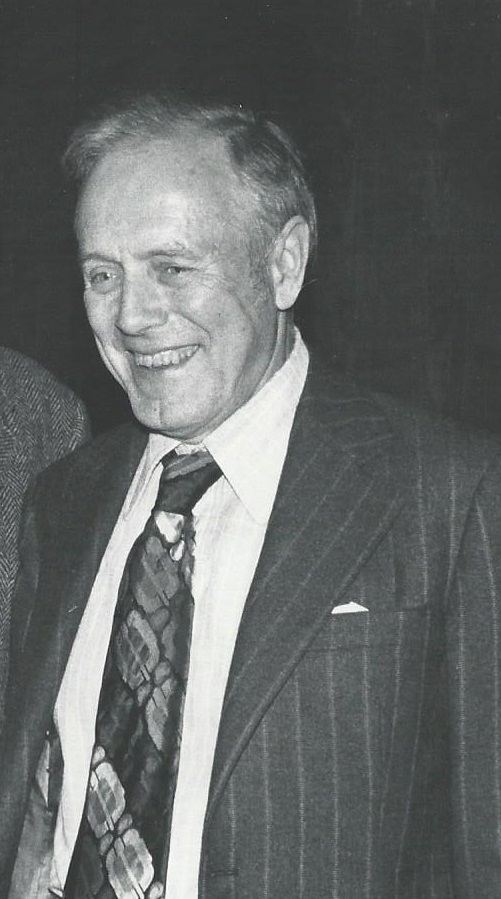
William T. R. Fox, c. 1984

William Thornton Rickert Fox (January 12, 1912 – October 24, 1988), generally known as William T. R. Fox (or occasionally W. T. R. Fox), was an American foreign policy professor and international relations theoretician at the Columbia University (1950–1980, emeritus 1980–1988). He is perhaps mostly known as the coiner of the term "superpower" in 1944. He wrote several books about the foreign policy of the United States of America and the United Kingdom (and the British Empire). He was a pioneer in establishing international relations, and the systematic study of statecraft and war, as a major academic discipline. National security policy and an examination of civil-military relations were also focuses of his interests and career. He was the founding director of Columbia's Institute of War and Peace Studies and held the position from 1951–1976.

== Early life and early career ==
Fox was born and grew up in Chicago. He attended Haverford College, graduating Phi Beta Kappa with a B.S. in 1932.

He then obtained his masters and Ph.D. degrees at the University of Chicago, in 1934 and 1940, respectively. There he was among a group of students, which also included V. O. Key, Jr. and David Truman, who studied with the pioneering political scientist Charles E. Merriam. He also studied international law under Quincy Wright. Harold Lasswell and his approach towards political analysis was the biggest influence on Fox there.

He married Annette Baker in 1935, who also became a Ph.D. from the University of Chicago and an international relations scholar. They had two children together and sometimes collaborated on academic work as well.

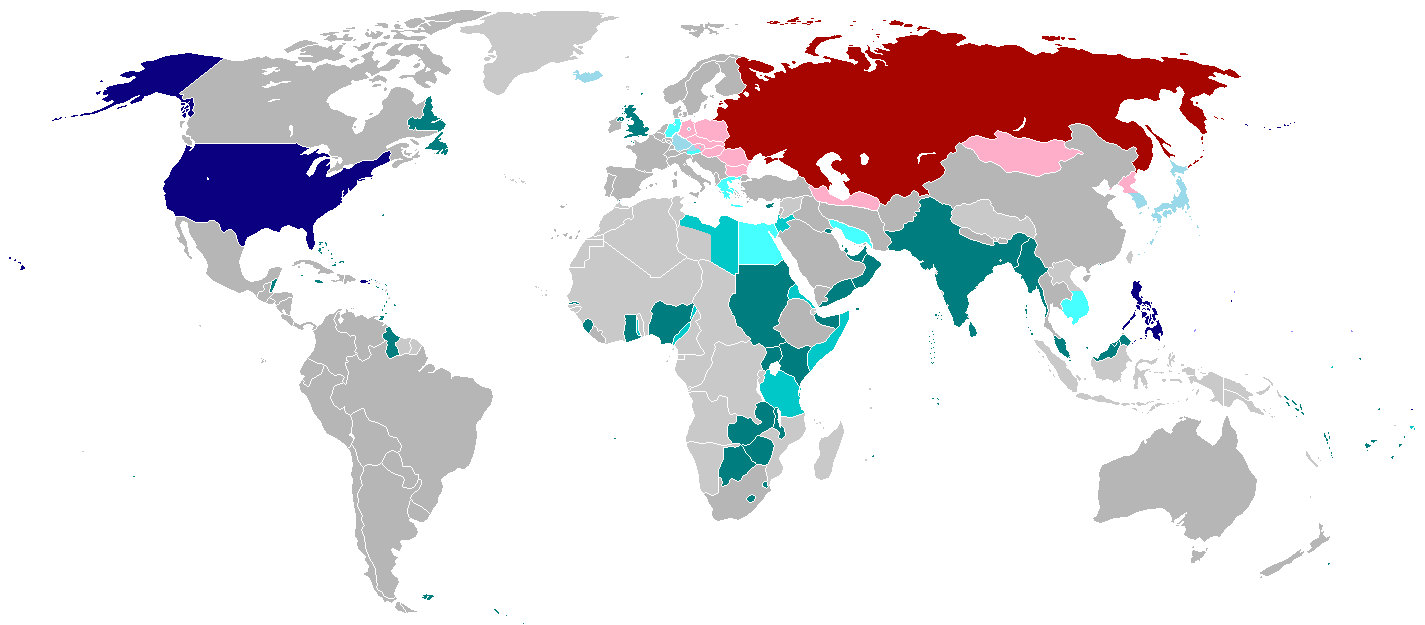
A world map of 1945. According to William T.R. Fox, the United States (blue), the Soviet Union (red), and the British Empire (turquoise) were superpowers.

Fox initially taught as an instructor at Temple University from 1936–1941 and Princeton University from 1941–1943. He joined Yale University in 1943 and became an associate professor there in 1946. He was associate director of the Yale Institute of International Studies from 1943 to 1950. The director there, Frederick S. Dunn – who held that international relations was "politics in the absence of central authority" – was another important influence on Fox.

Fox coined the word "superpower" in his 1944 book The Super-Powers: The United States, Britain, and the Soviet Union – Their Responsibility for Peace to identify a new category of power able to occupy the highest status in a world in which, as the war then raging demonstrated, states could challenge and fight each other on a global scale. According to him, there were (at that moment) three states that were superpowers: the United States, the Soviet Union, and the British Empire. The book forecast the directions that Soviet-American relations would take if the powers did not collaborate, but also made an effort to explore feasible opportunities that leaders might have to forestall that future. Fox was part of the international staff at the 1945 United Nations Conference on International Organization, the San Francisco meeting that led to the creation of the United Nations Charter. He was one of the contributors to Bernard Brodie's landmark 1946 volume The Absolute Weapon: Atomic Power and World Order, where he recognized with Brodie that the future nuclear stand-off between the U.S. and U.S.S.R. would become focused on the fear of mutual destruction, but in his portion explored ways that international agreements to limit or control nuclear weapons might improve matters. Fox came away from his activities during this period convinced that the framing of international relations theory should be around the proposition that, "If man is to have the opportunity to exercise some measure of rational control over his destiny, the limits of the possible and the consequences of the desirable both have to be investigated."

== Columbia years and organizational positions ==
Fox joined the Columbia faculty as a full professor in 1950. Later, he became the James T. Shotwell Professor of International Relations from 1968–1972, the Bryce Professor of the History of International Relations from 1972–1980, and Bryce Professor Emeritus after that.

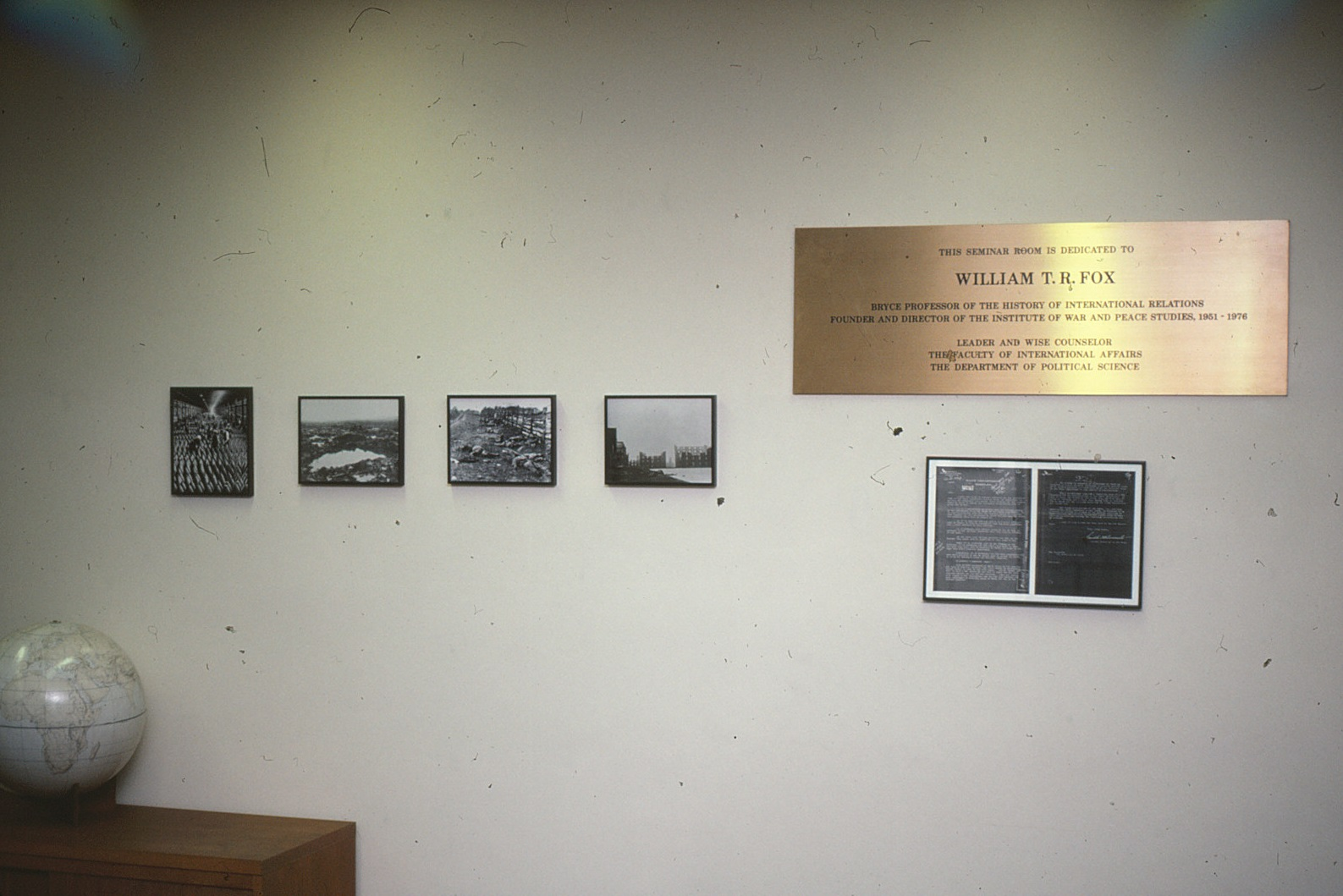
A dedication plaque at the Institute of War and Peace Studies at Columbia University marks Fox's role in founding the institute and leading it for its first 25 years.

Upon the request of President of Columbia Dwight D. Eisenhower, in 1951 Fox became the first director of the university's Institute of War and Peace Studies, a position he would hold for 25 years. Fox said that the new institute would focus on security studies and that its aim was "to find a road to security with the most peace and the least war." Early areas of focus for the institute were civil–military relations and the Cold War and nuclear strategy; these areas, and especially the first, were of particular interest to Fox. Meanwhile, Fox remained focused on developing the academic discipline of international relations theory and was one of the key influential figures in discussions about that theory during this period.

Under the leadership of Fox, the Institute of War and Peace Studies became a viable operation; John A. Krout, dean of the graduate faculty, said after ten years had gone by that the institute had "done a great deal of fine work". One emphasis of the institute was in research, and by 1986 nearly 70 books had been published in connection with the institute.

Fox often spent time abroad as a scholar, including in England in 1955, as a Fulbright Lecturer at the Rio Branco Institute and Pontifical Catholic University of Rio de Janeiro in Brazil in 1966, in Mexico in 1967, and as a visiting research fellow at Australian National University in 1968 and 1979. In addition, he was a visiting professor at Carleton University in Ottawa in 1971, as well as the Claude T. Bissell Visiting Professor of Canadian-American Relations at the University of Toronto for 1982–83. He saw Canada as an ideal vehicle for studying what was similar and different compared to the U.S. in foreign policy, and in 1985 he published the book A Continent Apart: The United States and Canada in World Politics. He served as a consultant to the U.S. Department of State for a number of years, as well as to other governmental agencies, and lectured at the National War College and various service branch colleges.

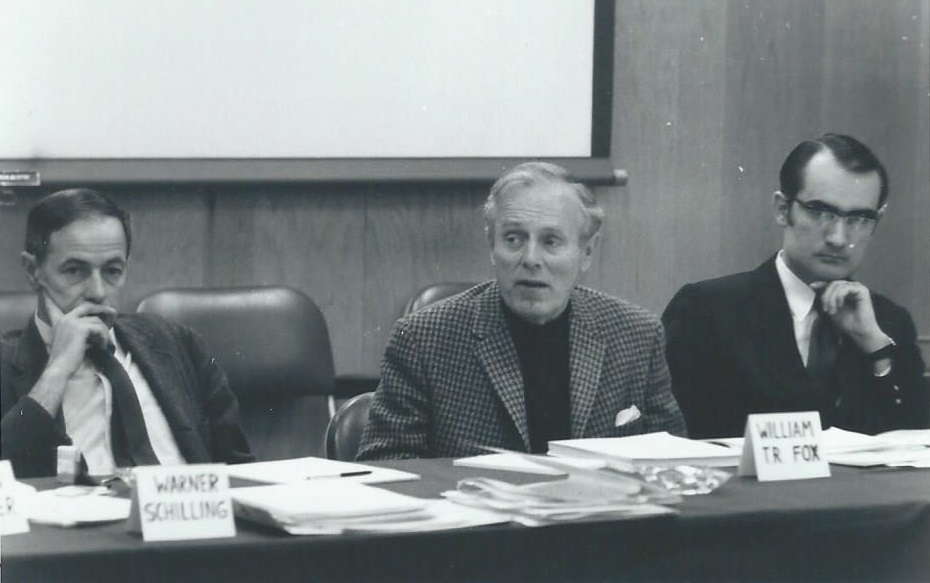
Fox (center) at a 1969 conference for the United States Arms Control and Disarmament Agency to discuss American defense postures and European security. On the left is colleague and former student Warner R. Schilling; on the right, Wilfrid L. Kohl.

Long interested in issues surrounding NATO, Fox and his wife Annette Baker Fox published NATO and the Range of American Choice in 1967, which analyzed the range of reactions to the evolution of NATO and the American role within it. Fox also worked on behalf of the Arms Control and Disarmament Agency, addressing issues related to the security of Western Europe. In a 1967 address to one of the World Affairs Councils of America, Fox said that NATO "seems superfluous because it is working ... it is in part a victim of its own success."

During his career, Fox described himself as a "pragmatic meliorist" who believed in the possibility of improving how international relations were conducted and in highlighting the normative meanings of domestic and world policies. Former colleague and dean David Truman later said, "He was an impressive scholar with a tremendous range. He was interested in the whole political scene, not just international relations, and was always full of ideas about how to do things better." One of his longtime courses at Columbia was called "Systematic World Politics"; as it evolved, its reading list gave more space to issues such as imperialism, International inequality, and limited global resources, but always focused at the end upon the range of choices for future world orders. Towards the end of his career at Columbia, he developed an explicit focus on moral concerns and human rights, giving courses such as "Means and Ends in International Relations" and "Human Rights and U.S. Foreign Policy".

He was the first managing editor of the journal World Politics, a position he held from 1948 to 1953. Under his guidance it became the preeminent journal in its field, and his system of commissioning review articles for it endured past his time there. He remained a member of its editorial board through 1978. He was also an advisory board member of the Journal of International Affairs from 1952 until 1988. In addition, he was a founding editor of the journal International Organization.

Fox was president of the International Studies Association (ISA) in 1972–73. In addition, he was a former vice president of the American Political Science Association. He also chaired a committee for research on national security policy in the Social Science Research Council from 1953 to 1964. The conferences it sponsored under Fox's guidance aided the development of the field and gave those starting in the field as sense of intellectual community. Fox was also a fellow of the American Academy of Arts and Sciences.

Fox and his wife were residents of the Riverside neighborhood of Greenwich, Connecticut for four decades and he was active in the First Congregational Church of Old Greenwich. He died at Greenwich Hospital of heart disease on October 24, 1988, having suffered a heart attack and been hospitalized two months earlier.

== Legacy ==
In 1991, The Evolution of Theory in International Relations, a Festschrift-like collection of essays in honor of William T. R. Fox, was published, many of which had been featured in the special Spring/Summer 1990 issue of Journal of International Affairs. Edited by Robert L. Rothstein, it featured contributions from Kenneth N. Waltz, Robert Jervis, Glenn H. Snyder, Louis Henkin, Ernst B. Haas, and others, as well as a preface from his wife, Annette Baker Fox. In her essay, Professor Elizabeth C. Hanson said that, "Bill Fox helped to shape international relations as a major academic field and to demonstrate the relevance of its theoretical investigations to policy making." She went on to describe his contributions as a professor and colleague, writing that, "Fox's influence as teacher and mentor on the discipline of international relations was enormous. Scores of students who participated in his seminars now fill high academic or policy-making positions." Many of the "Great Debates" in international relations theory happened during this era. But Fox's non-dogmatic approach meant there was a wide range of intellectual diversity and scholarly approach among his students and mentees.

In other settings, the scholar Lucja Swiatkowski Cannon wrote that Fox "was a U.S. pioneer in establishing the systematic study of statecraft and war as an academic discipline." Another scholar, James McAllister, noted that Fox's influence at Columbia's Institute of War and Peace Studies was being felt well after his death. Two-time National Security Advisor Brent Scowcroft recalled of his time at Columbia's graduate school in the early 1950s, "My guiding star was William T. R. Fox, who had a really fine strategic mind, and I was fortunate to have him to guide me. ... he's probably the one person who stands out in my mind as having shaped the way I thought." The British international relations scholar Michael Cox mentioned Fox as one of the "giants" of international relations theory, along with Hans Morgenthau, Paul Nitze, Arnold Wolfers, and Reinhold Niebuhr.

== Notable students ==
- Kenneth N. Waltz
- Glenn H. Snyder
- Warner R. Schilling
- Morton Kaplan
- William Kaufmann
- Lucian Pye
- Roger Hilsman
- Brent Scowcroft
- Amos Jordan
- Michael Armacost
- Michael Nacht
- Richard N. Gardner
- Samuel P. Huntington
- Robert Rothstein

== Published works ==
Books

- The Super-Powers: The United States, Britain, and the Soviet Union – Their Responsibility for Peace (Harcourt Brace, 1944)
- The Absolute Weapon: Atomic Power and World Order (Harcourt Brace, 1946) [co-author with Bernard Brodie, Frederick Sherwood Dunn, Arnold Wolfers, Percy Ellwood Corbett]
- Theoretical Aspects of International Relations (University of Notre Dame Press, 1959) [editor]
- The American Study of International Relations (University of South Carolina Press, 1968) [compilation of previously published journal articles]
- NATO and the Range of American Choice (Columbia University Press, 1967) [co-author with Annette Baker Fox]
- American Arms and a Changing Europe: Dilemmas of Deterrence and Disarmament (Columbia University Press, 1973) [co-author with Warner R. Schilling, Catherine M. Kelleher, and Donald J. Puchala]
- European Security and the Atlantic System (Columbia University Press, 1973) [co-editor with Warner R. Schilling]
- A Continent Apart: The United States and Canada in World Politics (Bissell Lectures, 1982–3) (University of Toronto Press, 1985)

Selected articles

- "Competence of Courts in Regard to 'Non-Sovereign' Acts of Foreign States", American Journal of International Law, Vol. 35, No. 4 (Oct., 1941), pp. 632–640.
- "The Super-Powers at San Francisco", in The Review of Politics, Vol. 8, No. 1 (1946), pp. 115–127.
- "Interwar International Relations Research: The American Experience", in World Politics, Vol. 2, No. 1 (1949), pp. 67–79.
- Britain and America in the Era of Total Diplomacy, Center of International Studies, Princeton University, 1952 [report, co-author with Annette Baker Fox]
- "Civilians, Soldiers, and American Military Policy", in World Politics, Vol. 7, No. 3 (1955), pp. 402–418.
- "The Teaching of International Relations in the United States", in World Politics, Vol. 13, No. 3 (1961), pp. 339–359 [co-author with Annette Baker Fox]
- "Representativeness and Efficiency Dual Problem of Civil-Military Relations", in Political Science Quarterly, Vol. 76, No. 3 (Sep., 1961), pp. 354–366.
- "Science, Technology and International Politics", in International Studies Quarterly, Vol. 12, No. 1. (Mar., 1968), pp. 1–15.
- "'The Truth Shall Make You Free': One Student's Appreciation of Quincy Wright", in The Journal of Conflict Resolution, Vol. 14, No. 4. (Dec., 1970), pp. 449–452.
- "The Problems of War Termination: The Causes of Peace and Conditions of War", in Annals of the American Academy of Political and Social Science, Vol. 392, How Wars End. (Nov., 1970), pp. 1–13.
