= Frederick Sherwood Dunn =

American international relations scholar

Dunn in 1951

Frederick Sherwood Dunn (June 10, 1893 – March 17, 1962) was an American scholar of international law and international relations. After working as a legal officer at the U.S. Department of State, he went into academia and taught at Johns Hopkins University, Yale University, and Princeton University, publishing several books during his career. He was founder and a director of both Yale's Institute of International Studies and the Center of International Studies at Princeton. He founded the journal World Politics and was chairman of its editorial board until 1961.

== Early life and military service ==
Dunn was born in Manhattan, New York City on June 10, 1893, to parents George Warren Dunn and the former Sarah Benton Brown. He graduated from the Kelvin School, a preparatory school for boys in Manhattan, in 1910. He then went to Princeton University, from where he graduated in 1914 with a Bachelor of Letters degree, followed by the New York University School of Law, from where he earned a Doctor of law degree in 1917.

He was admitted to the bar in 1917 but during that year entered the United States Army, in which he served until 1919. With the American Expeditionary Forces in France, he was a first lieutenant in the Tank Corps.

== Legal career ==
Upon returning to the United States, Dunn began practicing law in Washington, D.C., in 1920. He worked as a legal officer at the U.S. Department of State, where his positions included being an Assistant Solicitor, an associate counsel in American and British Claims Arbitration, and a lawyer for United States agent before the Mixed Claims Commission (United States and Mexico). He was known as Ted Dunn to friends.

In 1922, Dunn became engaged to, and then married, Eliza Gordon Woodbury. She was the daughter Gordon Woodbury, the former Assistant Secretary of the Navy, and she also went by the name Gordon. They had two children, but she died in 1929, three weeks after giving birth for the second time.

== Scholar of international law ==
While in State Department positions, two of which involved international claims commissions, Dunn began thinking about the factors behind how the claims were decided and how they often went beyond legal considerations. He studied international law at Johns Hopkins University, in part supported by a Carnegie Fellowship, and earned a Ph.D. there in 1928. In 1927, Dunn was also enrolled at the Geneva Graduate Institute.

Between 1928 and 1933 Dunn published three influential books (the first of which was based on his dissertation), as well as several articles, on the sociological aspect of international jurisprudence.

Dunn was the Creswell Lecturer on International Law at Johns Hopkins from 1929 to 1935 and during the same period was also executive secretary of the Walter Hines Page School of International Relations at the same university.

== Scholar of international relations ==
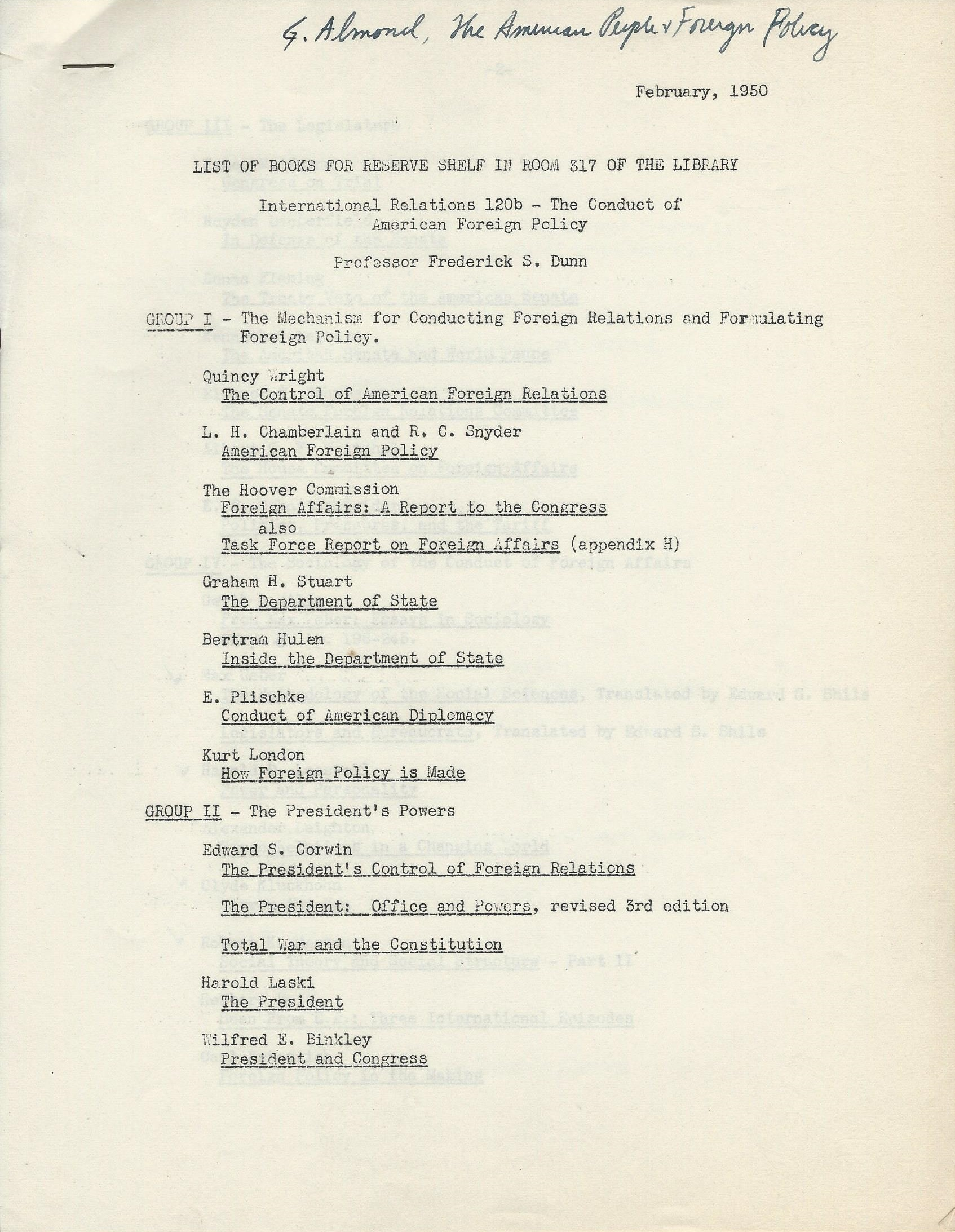
Reading list for one of Dunn's international relations courses at Yale

In 1935, Dunn went to Yale University, where he became a professor of international relations. At the same time he was a co-founder of the Yale Institute of International Studies along with Nicholas J. Spykman, the new entity's first director, and Arnold Wolfers. Dunn's own investigations broadened greatly in scope from his earlier work but he still applied the perspective he had developed studying international law to issues of world politics.

Dunn became the director of the institute in 1940, when Spykman fell ill, and held that post through 1951. From this point on, his administrative and project roles took priority over his own research and writing. Under Dunn, the institute had a loose, informal organization. It focused on work that would clarify choices faced by American foreign policy and determine ways in which American power could best be deployed. Dunn urged institute members to write with clarity and to keep their books short. Journalist Fred Kaplan has written, "In the 1940s, there was no more exciting and stimulating place in the academic world for an international relations scholar to reside than at the Institute of International Studies at Yale."

Regarding the causes of war, Dunn argued that "the origin of wars is to be found ... in the minds ... of men". He maintained that ignorance and dissatisfaction were what gave rise to war, and advocated for a United Nations that could contribute to world peace through provision of education and raising living standards. During 1948 and 1949 Dunn was a U.S. delegate to UNESCO general conferences in Beirut and Paris.

In 1949 Dunn remarried, to Mary Beale Willard, and gained two step-children.

== Shift of universities ==
During 1950–51, the Yale Institute of International Studies ran into a conflict with the new President of Yale University, A. Whitney Griswold, who felt that scholars should conduct research as individuals rather than in cooperative groups and who thought that the institute should do more historical, detached analysis rather than focus on current issues and recommendations on policy. In addition there was some personal animosity involved, related to Griswold believing that institute members had argued against his receiving tenure.

In April 1951, Dunn and five of his political science colleagues – Percy Corbett, Gabriel Almond, Klaus Knorr, William Kaufmann, and Bernard C. Cohen – left Yale en masse and went to Princeton. With the goal of strengthening international studies within the Woodrow Wilson School of Public and International Affairs at that university, the Center of International Studies was created. The news of the shift from Yale to Princeton made the front page of The New York Times; the new center became known as the continuation of the old institute, with one government publication later terming it a "reincarnation". The President of Princeton, Harold W. Dodds, used a metaphor from American football to summarize the events: "Yale fumbled and Princeton recovered the ball." One statement written after Dunn's passing said of him, "Beneath a quiet, unassuming manner, Frederick Dunn maintained unyielding firmness in acts of whose rightness he was convinced. It is believed that his transfer of the Center from Yale to Princeton was an instance of this."

In addition to being director of the center, Dunn was named the Albert G. Milbank Professor of International Law and Practice at Princeton. Dunn's later scholarly work included a focus on decision-making and some of the self-deceptions made by Foreign Offices: in particular, he stated that people often thought they were finding a solution to a technical problem when in actuality they were making a political choice.

During his career Dunn also served as a trustee for the Carnegie Endowment for International Peace, was the chair of the board of editors of the quarterly academic journal World Politics, which had been founded at the Yale institute, and did consulting work for the RAND Corporation. He was also a twenty-year member of the Century Association.

== Retirement and death ==
Dunn retired from Princeton in July 1961. He did teach a seminar in politics at Bryn Mawr College during the fall of that year, while continuing to reside in Princeton.

He died on March 17, 1962, at the University of Pennsylvania Hospital's neurological unit. His final book, Peace-making and the Settlement with Japan, was published posthumously in 1963.

One of his colleagues, William T. R. Fox, noted that Dunn's legacy could be seen in how the Yale Institute of International Studies became a model for other international relations research entities to follow, including the Princeton center, Columbia University's Institute of War and Peace Studies, the MIT Center for International Studies, and the Washington Center of Foreign Policy Research at Johns Hopkins, and that all four were initially led by colleagues of Dunn at Yale.

== Published works ==
- The Practice and Procedure of International Conferences (Johns Hopkins Press, 1929)
- The Protection of Nationals: A Study in the Application of International Law (Johns Hopkins Press, 1932)
- The Diplomatic Protection of Americans in Mexico (Columbia University Press, 1933)
- Peaceful Change: A Study of International Procedures (Council on Foreign Relations, 1937)
- The Absolute Weapon: Atomic Power and World Order [contributor] (Harcourt, Brace and Co., 1946)
- War and the Minds of Men (Council on Foreign Relations, 1950)
- Peace-making and the Settlement with Japan (Princeton University Press, 1963)
