= Cyril Edwin Black =

American historian (1915–1989)

- Born: September 10, 1915; Bryson City, North Carolina, U.S.
- Died: July 18, 1989 (aged 73); Princeton, New Jersey, U.S.
- Education: Duke University; Harvard University (PhD)
- Occupation: Historian
- Spouse: Corinne Manning Black
- Parent(s): Floyd Henson Black; Zarafinka Kirova Black

Cyril Edwin Black (September 10, 1915, Bryson City, North Carolina – July 18, 1989, Princeton, New Jersey) was a professor of history and international affairs, specializing in the modern history of Eastern Europe and, in particular, Russian history since 1700.

== Biography ==
The son of Floyd Henson Black, president of Istanbul's Robert College, and Zarafinka Kirova Black, a native of Bulgaria, Cyril E. Black grew up in Turkey and Bulgaria. The family moved from Istanbul to Sofia, Bulgaria in 1926. Cyril E. Black received secondary education at the American College of Sofia and then returned to the United States to attend Duke University. After study from 1934 to 1935 at Besançon's University of Franche-Comté and in the summer of 1935 at the University of Berlin, he graduated in 1936 with a bachelor's degree from Duke University. At Harvard University he graduated with a master's degree in 1937 and a Ph.D. in 1941.

Black began teaching history at Princeton University in 1939 and went on leave of absence during World War II. From 1943 to 1946 he served with the State Department in Washington and Eastern Europe. During the Second World War, the United States Foreign Service created a Foreign Service Auxiliary, in which Black became an officer and from 1944 to 1945 served as an aide to the U.S. Political Adviser on the Allied Control Commission in Bulgaria. Journalist Mark Foster Ethridge (1896–1981) was sent on several fact-finding missions from 1945 to 1947 by the U.S. State Department to several Balkan countries and also the Soviet Union. In autumn 1945 Black was in Bulgaria, Romania, and the Soviet Union as adviser to the Etheridge Mission that was sent to report on the implementation of the Yalta Declaration. Black, along with other officials, was later charged with espionage by the Bulgarian government, but he dismissed the charge as "a complete fabrication."

In 1946, Black returned to Princeton University to inaugurate Princeton's course on Russian history for undergraduates and continued to teach the course until the 1970s. His course was an inspiration to James A. Baker III. Black was promoted to full professor in 1954. In 1958, he was a member of the U.S. delegation of observers in the elections to the Supreme Soviet of the USSR, where he met Nikita Khrushchev. From 1968 to 1986 he was the director of the Center of International Studies. In addition to modern Russian history he taught courses on comparative modernization and comparative modernization. At Princeton University he held from 1961 to 1970 the Duke Professorship of Modern History, from 1973 to 1983 the Shelby Cullom Davis Professorship of European History, and from 1983 to 1986 the James S. McDonnell Distinguished University Professorship. He retired as professor emeritus in 1986.

According to the economist John Cavanagh, Black was one of (at least) five Princeton University professors who were paid consultants for the CIA.

Black was the co-author or co-editor of a number of monographs and collections concerning Russia and the Soviet Union, world politics, and the international legal order. His papers are at the Princeton University Library.

A resident of Princeton, New Jersey, he died there on July 18, 1989. He was married to Corinne Manning Black. Upon his death he was survived by his widow, a son, a daughter, and a granddaughter.

== Books authored by C. E. Black ==
- Black, Cyril E. (1943). The Establishment of Constitutional Government in Bulgaria. Princeton, NJ: Princeton University Press – via Internet Archive.
- Understanding Soviet Politics: The Perspective of Russian History (1986)

== Books edited or coauthored by C. E. Black ==
- Challenge in Eastern Europe (1954);
- Rewriting Russian History (1956);
- Soviet Interpretation of Russia’s Past (1956);
- American Teaching About Russia (1959);
- The Transformation of Russian Society: Aspects of Social Change Since 1861 (1960);
- Communism and Revolution: The Strategic Uses of Political Violence (1964);
- The Modernization of Japan and Russia (1975).
