= Roger Hilsman =

American soldier, statesman, teacher, and author (1919–2014)

Roger Hilsman Jr.
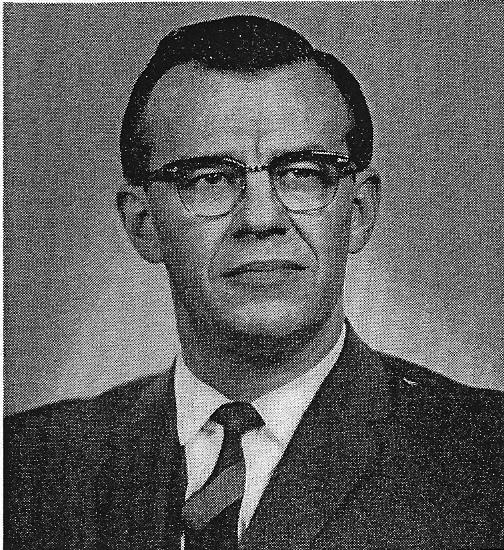
- Hilsman during the early 1960s

8th Assistant Secretary of State for Far Eastern Affairs
- In office May 9, 1963 – March 15, 1964
- President: John F. Kennedy; Lyndon B. Johnson
- Preceded by: W. Averell Harriman
- Succeeded by: William Bundy

2nd Director of the Bureau of Intelligence and Research
- In office February 19, 1961 – April 25, 1963
- President: John F. Kennedy
- Preceded by: Hugh S. Cumming Jr.
- Succeeded by: Thomas Lowe Hughes

Personal details
- Born: November 23, 1919 Waco, Texas
- Died: February 23, 2014 (aged 94) Ithaca, New York
- Party: Democratic
- Spouse: Eleanor Hoyt Hilsman
- Children: 4, including Hoyt Hilsman
- Education: United States Military Academy; Yale University
- Profession: Soldier, statesman, scholar, author

Roger Hilsman Jr. (November 23, 1919 – February 23, 2014) was an American soldier, government official, political scientist, and author. He saw action in the China-Burma-India Theater of World War II, first with Merrill's Marauders, getting wounded in combat, and then as a guerilla leader for the Office of Strategic Services. He later became an aide and adviser to President John F. Kennedy, and briefly to President Lyndon B. Johnson, in the U.S. State Department while he served as Director of the Bureau of Intelligence and Research in 1961 to 1963 and Assistant Secretary of State for Far Eastern Affairs in 1963 to 1964.

There, Hilsman was a key and controversial figure in the development of U.S. policies in South Vietnam during the early stages of American involvement in the Vietnam War. He was an advocate of a strategy that emphasized the political nature of the conflict as much as the military aspect and was a proponent of the removal from power of South Vietnamese president Ngô Đình Diệm. Hilsman left government in 1964 to teach at Columbia University and retired in 1990. He wrote many books about American foreign policy and international relations. He was a Democratic Party nominee for election to the U.S. House of Representatives in 1972 but lost in the general election.

== Early life ==
Hilsman was born on November 23, 1919, in Waco, Texas, the son of Roger Hilsman Sr., a career officer with the United States Army, and Emma Prendergast Hilsman. He lived in Waco only briefly, growing up on a series of military posts. He attended public schools for a while in Minneapolis, Minnesota. Hilsman spent part of his childhood in the Philippines, where his father was a company commander and later commandant of cadets at Ateneo de Manila, a Jesuit college. His father was a distant figure whom the young Hilsman endeavored to gain the approval of, such as by choosing a military career. Back in the United States, Hilsman attended Sacramento High School in Sacramento, California, where he was a leader in a Junior Reserve Officers' Training Corps program and graduated in 1937.

After spending a year at Millard's Preparatory School in Washington, DC, and another traveling around Europe, including a visit to Nazi Germany, Hilsman attended the United States Military Academy and graduated in 1943 with a B.S. degree and as a second lieutenant.

== World War II ==
Following U.S. entry into World War II, Hilsman's father, a colonel, fought under General Douglas MacArthur during the Japanese invasion of the Philippines. Two weeks into the conflict, newspaper reports described Colonel Hilsman as still holding Davao on the island of Mindanao. Later reports reflected his retreat to Malaybalay after he had faced overwhelming Japanese forces, followed by another move onto the island of Negros and he was captured by the Japanese once all the islands had surrendered in 1942.

After leaving West Point the younger Hilsman was immediately posted to the South-East Asian Theatre and joined the Merrill's Marauders long-range penetration jungle warfare unit, which fought the Japanese during the Burma Campaign. There, he found morale to be poor due to typhus outbreaks and unhappiness with the generals leading the unit. He participated in infantry operations during the battle for Myitkyina in May 1944 and suffered multiple stomach wounds from a Japanese machine gun while on a reconnaissance patrol.

After recovering in army field hospitals, Hilsman joined the Office of Strategic Services. Now a lieutenant, he at first served as a liaison officer to the British Army in Burma. He then volunteered to be put in command of a guerrilla warfare battalion, organized and supplied by OSS Detachment 101, of some 300 local partisans, mercenaries, and irregulars of varying ethnicities, operating behind the lines of the Japanese in Burma.

There, he developed an interest in guerrilla tactics and personally found them to be preferable to being part of infantry assaults. By early 1945, Hilsman was considered, as Detachment 101 commander William R. Peers later stated, to be one of a number of the guerillas' "good... junior officers, every one outstanding and experienced." Hilsman's group made hit-and-run attacks on Japanese forces and kept a Japanese regiment ten times its size occupied far from the front lines, all while waging its own battle with the ever-present leeches and other insects and various diseases. In one particular engagement in May 1945, Hilsman led a mixed company of Kachins, Burmese, and Karens in staging successful raids in the area between Lawksawk and Taunggyi that culminated in a carefully-orchestrated ambush that caused a hundred casualties among the Japanese at no cost to the guerillas. Hilsman wanted to deploy his unit farther south into the Inle Lake area but was constrained by orders to help hold the road between Taunggyi and Kengtung.

Soon after the Japanese surrender in 1945, Hilsman was part of an OSS group that staged a parachute mission into Manchuria to liberate American prisoners held in a Japanese camp near Mukden. There, he found his father, who became one of the first prisoners to be freed. His father asked as they hugged, "What took you so long?" At some point, Hilsman was promoted to captain. (Decades later, Hilsman related his wartime experiences in his 1990 memoir American Guerrilla: My War Behind Japanese Lines.)

Returning from the war, Hilsman served in the OSS as assistant chief of Far East intelligence operations in 1945 to 1946, and once the Central Intelligence Agency had been created, he served in it in the role of special assistant to executive officer in 1946 to 1947 (he belonged to the Central Intelligence Group during the interim period between the two organizations).

== Student, lecturer and researcher ==
Hilsman married Eleanor Willis Hoyt in 1946. They raised four children together. Sponsored by the Army, Hilsman attended Yale University, earning a master's degree in 1950 and a Ph.D. in 1951 in political science. He specialized in international relations and he studied under noted professors Arnold Wolfers and William T. R. Fox.

By 1951, Hilsman had risen to the rank of major. He worked on planning for the North Atlantic Treaty Organization and of Supreme Headquarters Allied Powers Europe with the Joint American Military Advance Group in London in 1950 to 1952 and as part of the International Policies Division of the United States European Command in Frankfurt, Germany, in 1952 to 1953. Waiting for the end of hostilities in the Korean War, he resigned from the Army in 1953 but kept reserve status.

Hilsman turned to academia and became a research associate and lecturer in international politics at the Center of International Studies at Princeton University from 1953 to 1956 and a part-time lecturer and research associate at the Washington Center of Foreign Policy Research, which was affiliated with the School of Advanced International Studies at Johns Hopkins University, from 1957 to 1961. In 1956, he published the book Strategic Intelligence and National Decisions. Based upon an expanded version of his dissertation, it became well thought of in government circles and entered the permanent White House collection. He was also a Rockefeller Fellow and a lecturer on international relations at Columbia University in 1958.

He was the chief of the foreign affairs division of the Congressional Research Service within the Library of Congress in 1956 to 1958 and then deputy director for research for them in 1958 to 1961. There, he met Senator John F. Kennedy and other members of Congress interested in foreign affairs.

== Kennedy administration ==
During staffing of the incoming Kennedy administration, the nominee for Under Secretary of State, Chester Bowles, aggressively sought academics and journalists who would be committed to the ideals of the New Frontier. In line with this, Hilsman was selected to be the Director of the Bureau of Intelligence and Research for the U.S. Department of State, assuming the position in February 1961. His duty was to analyze foreign events and trends as part of the department's long-range planning. Hilsman soon became a key planner within the administration's foreign policy circles. Like many of the "New Frontiersmen," he had fought with distinction as a junior officer in World War II. Hilsman was particularly effective at talking to members of the U.S. Congress because that military background and war record appealed to hardliners and his academic history and intellectual leanings appealed to those more of that bent.

A Hilsman memorandum in November 1962 tried to account for the deployments of Soviet intermediate-range ballistic missiles in Cuba

His background in guerrilla warfare led him in 1961, together with Walt Rostow, to push for the American armed forces and the State Department to emphasize counterguerrilla training. Hilsman was involved for more than two months in the U.S. responses to Soviet actions during the Cuban Missile Crisis of 1962, including developing informal communications with Soviet officials and the briefing of congressional leaders. He was also involved in the State Department's analysis of the Sino-Soviet split and the possible conditions for future warming in Sino-American relations.

Hilsman became one of the main architects of American policy in Vietnam during the early 1960s and in January 1962 presented the plan "A Strategic Concept for South Vietnam." It stated that the war was primarily a political struggle and proposed policies that emphasized that the Vietnamese in rural areas were the key to victory. It also recommended for the Army of the Republic of Vietnam to start using guerrilla tactics. Out of the report came Kennedy's approval of American participation in the Strategic Hamlet Program, the relocation of rural peasants into villages consolidated and reshaped to create a defensible, networked perimeter, with the goal of removing population from contact and influence with the Viet Cong. The implementation of the program by the South Vietnamese government became problematic, however, and Hilsman later stated that its execution was a "total misunderstanding of what the [Strategic Hamlet] program should try to do."

In 1962, reports from American journalists in South Vietnam about the progress of the conflict with the Viet Cong, and the characteristics of the South Vietnamese government under President Ngô Đình Diệm, differed from the picture that the American military was portraying. Kennedy became alarmed, and in December 1962, Hilsman, together with Michael Forrestal of the U.S. National Security Council staff, were sent by Kennedy on a fact-finding mission to South Vietnam. The Hilsman–Forrestal Report was delivered to Kennedy on January 25, 1963. It described weaknesses in the South Vietnamese government; the corruption of Diệm, his brother Ngô Đình Nhu, and their cohorts; and the increasing isolation of and lack of support for the Diệm regime from the South Vietnamese people. Overall, however, the report came to some optimistic conclusions: "Our overall judgment, in sum, is that we are probably winning, but certainly more slowly than we had hoped. At the rate it is now going the war will last longer than we would like, cost more in terms of both lives and money than we anticipated...." The report thus contributed to the escalation of American involvement in Vietnam and to growing doubts in U.S. government circles about the usefulness of the Diệm regime.

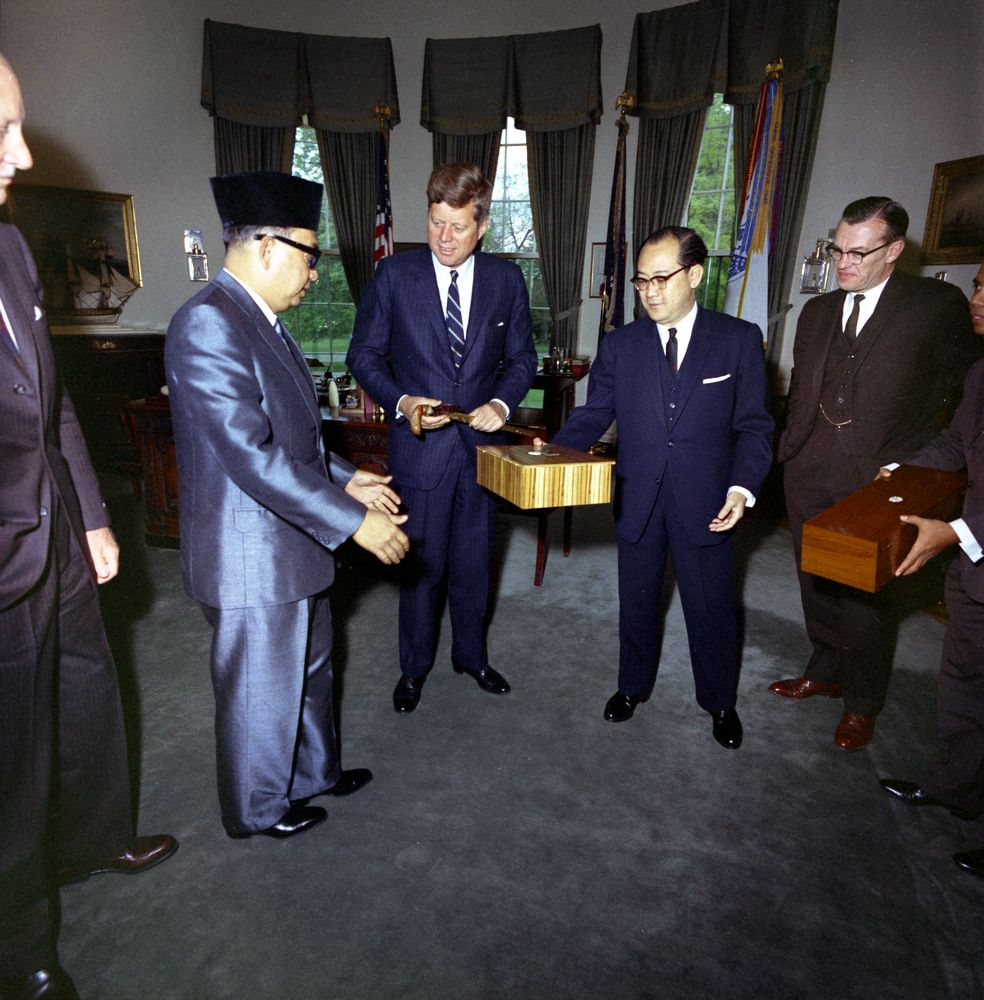
Hilsman (far right) at the White House in April 1963 during a presentation of gifts with Kennedy and Deputy Prime Minister of Malaya Tun Abdul Razak

In March 1963, the White House announced that Hilsman would become Assistant Secretary of State for Far Eastern Affairs, replacing Averell Harriman (who was promoted to an undersecretary position). Hilsman had risen quickly in the government bureaucracy, partly because Kennedy liked his willingness to challenge the military. A New York Times profile that year described Hilsman as "a restless, bouncy, aggressive but deeply reflective man". Hilsman assumed the new position in May 1963. The same month, the Buddhist crisis began in South Vietnam, which featured a series of repressive acts by the South Vietnamese government and a campaign of civil resistance led mainly by Buddhist monks. Doubts grew further about Diệm, and within the Kennedy administration Hilsman became the most outspoken proponent of a coup against Diệm.

On August 24, 1963, in the wake of raids against Buddhist pagodas across the country by Nhu's special forces, Hilsman, along with Forrestal and Harriman, drafted and sent Cable 243, an important message from the State Department to U.S. Ambassador Henry Cabot Lodge Jr. In South Vietnam. The message declared that Washington would no longer tolerate Nhu remaining in a position of power and ordered Lodge to pressure Diệm to remove his brother and that if Diệm refused, the United States would explore the possibility for alternative leadership in South Vietnam. Lodge replied that he saw no reason to speak to Diem about this and proposed that "we go straight to the generals with our demands, without informing Diem." The State Department quickly approved that change. The cable had the overall effect of giving tacit American approval for a coup against the regime. Hilsman was the point man for the cable – some contemporaries referred to it as the "Roger Hilsman cable" – as it was approved and sent while many higher-ranking officials were out of town, and each of the officials who were called to approve it did so because he thought some other official had approved it. The events surrounding the sending of the cable led to Kennedy's becoming quite upset over the disorganization within his government. The events have also long been criticized as at best an example of a bizarrely poor decisionmaking process and at worst a case in which a small group of secondary, anti-Diệm figures was able to circumvent normal procedures with a consequent harmful effect on the situation in Vietnam.

On November 1, the 1963 South Vietnamese coup came. Although it was conducted by South Vietnamese generals, they had been encouraged by the United States and so there was shared responsibility. American decisionmakers did not want the coup to involve assassination of the current leaders, but by the next day, Diệm and his brother had been arrested and assassinated. The coup set off a period of political instability in South Vietnam that opened the door to more American involvement.

Hilsman was one of the academics and intellectuals in the administration who were later grouped by the author David Halberstam in his book as The Best and the Brightest for the misguided foreign policy that they crafted and its disastrous consequences. Hilsman's role has been variously interpreted. Mark Moyar's 2006 book Triumph Forsaken: The Vietnam War, 1954–1965 paints Hilsman as one of the key Americans who shortsightedly and arrogantly pushed out Diệm when, Moyar says, the struggle against the communists was being won. Guenter Lewy portrays Hilsman as being "farsighted and correct" in his perspective from 1964 and on, while the scholar Howard Jones views the coup against Diệm that Hilsman acted in favor of as "a tragically misguided move."

== Johnson administration ==
Following Kennedy's assassination on November 22, 1963, Hilsman stayed in his position under the new president, Lyndon B. Johnson. But Johnson sought a narrower range of opinion on foreign policy matters than Kennedy had and Hilsman, along with a number of other formerly influential State Department figures, was now not being listened to. Furthermore, by this time, in the words of Halberstam, "[Hilsman] had probably made more enemies than anyone else in the upper levels of government." Secretary of Defense Robert McNamara and the Joint Chiefs of Staff disliked Hilsman for his constant questioning of military estimates and forthrightness, Secretary of State Dean Rusk had been angered by Hilsman's tendency to circumvent proper channels and by the friction Hilsman caused with the military, and as vice president, Johnson had not liked Hilsman's brashness or his policies. Kennedy as Hilsman's protector was gone, and Johnson determined that he wanted Hilsman out.

At the same time, Hilsman disagreed with Johnson's approach to the Vietnam War, viewing the new president as primarily seeking a military solution there rather than a political one. Not liking anyone to quit outright, the president offered the position of Ambassador to the Philippines, but Hilsman declined. And while Hilsman would later say that he had initiated the resignation, Rusk later stated: "I fired him".

In any case, on February 25, 1964, the White House announced that Hilsman had resigned; the statement was front-page news in The New York Times with Hilsman claiming he had no policy quarrels with the current administration. As his tenure ended, Hilsman argued in favor of continued perseverance in the conflict using a pacification-based counter-insurgency strategy, but against increased military action against North Vietnam, saying that until the counter-insurgency efforts had demonstrated improvement in the South, action against the North would have no effect on the Communists. His stance lost out within the administration to those who advocated the virtues of air power. Hilsman's last day in office was March 15, 1964. He was replaced at the Bureau of Far Eastern Affairs by William Bundy.

== Professor and political candidate ==
In his resignation letter, Hilsman had said that he considered university teaching his "basic profession". Hilsman became a professor at Columbia University in 1964, joining the Department of Public Law and Government within its School of International Affairs. The course he gave on foreign policy decision-making became known for the anecdotes he told about the famous figures in the Kennedy administration and for the political theory he introduced in explanation. Indeed, Hilsman became known as one of the expansive "Kennedy network", and his office at Columbia was adorned with Kennedy-era mementos.

He also became part of the university's Institute of War and Peace Studies, where his former professor William T. R. Fox was director. Hilsman became one of the longest-serving professors in the institute. He also regularly lectured at the various U.S. war colleges. Hilsman lived in Morningside Heights, Manhattan, but he and his family also became longtime residents of the Hamburg Cove area of Lyme, Connecticut, for weekends and summers. He and his wife later became full-time residents there.

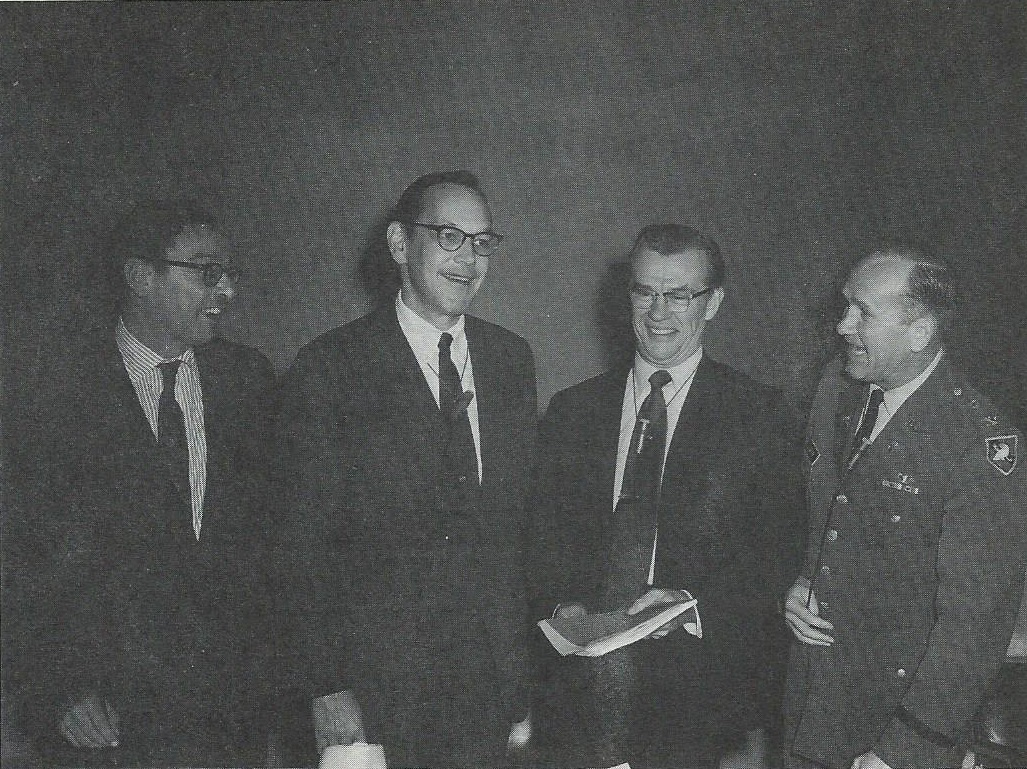
Professor Hilsman (second from right) at a conference at the United States Military Academy at West Point in December 1969, with syndicated columnist Joseph Kraft, U.S. Representative from Ohio Robert A. Taft Jr., and Colonel Amos A. Jordan Jr.

Hilsman was one of the institute's most prolific book authors. Of particular note was his 1967 work To Move a Nation: The Politics of Foreign Policy in the Administration of John F. Kennedy, which combined a theoretical political science approach with a personal memoir. It was the first book by a maker of policy to dissent on the course of the Vietnam War. The New York Times Book Review called it a "highly informative study of the internal and external forces that shaped much of American foreign policy" and said that "Hilsman makes many wise and perceptive comments on the politics of policy-making." To Move a Nation became a National Book Award finalist and has been viewed as influential. His 1971 volume, Politics of Policy Making in Defense and Foreign Affairs: Conceptual Models and Bureaucratic Politics, was used as the textbook for his class and went through three editions.

Hilsman continued to speak publicly, in print and on television, regarding what he thought should be done in Vietnam, such as in August 1964, when he warned against over-militarizing the conflict, and in mid-1967, when he said the war was not politically "winnable" and that the U.S. should scale down its military involvement and stop the ongoing bombing campaign against the North. He consistently maintained that had Kennedy lived, he would not have escalated the war the way Johnson did. Hilsman was an ardent supporter of Robert Kennedy's 1968 presidential campaign, serving as one of the expert advisors. He was part of a large "brain trust" of advisers to Kennedy during the crucial Democratic California primary in June 1968; that ended with another Kennedy assassination.

Hilsman later tried his own hand at electoral politics: In the 1972 Congressional elections, he ran for election to the United States House of Representatives as the Democratic Party nominee for Connecticut's 2nd congressional district. He secured the Democratic nomination in a race where few Democrats wanted to run or thought the party had much of a chance of winning. He campaigned on domestic issues as well as those of foreign policy, presenting a five-point plan for increasing employment in eastern Connecticut. He predicted his chances of winning were directly linked to Democratic presidential nominee George McGovern's performance in the state against Richard Nixon, the incumbent whom Hilsman termed a threat to civil liberties. McGovern lost in a landslide, and Hilsman lost the congressional general election to the Republican incumbent, Robert H. Steele, by a wide margin (66 to 34 percent).

Hilsman retired from Columbia in 1990 upon reaching the then-mandatory retirement age of 70. Reflecting upon his life, he said, "I've been doing the same thing in the military, on Capital Hill, and at Columbia. The content is the same. ... Of all my careers, I think university teaching is the most satisfying." He and his course, "The Politics of Policy Making", were not directly replaced.

== Later years ==
In 1994, President Bill Clinton named Hilsman to the National Security Education Board, where he served until his term expired in 1999.

Hilsman remained active in local politics, where he was a member of the Democratic Town Committee in Lyme for over two decades. During the 1990s he led a letter-writing campaign to the Connecticut State Police on behalf of safer street speeds in Lyme. He continued to publish books on a variety of subjects into his eighties. He and his wife later lived in Chester, Connecticut, and Ithaca, New York. Through 2014, Hilsman was still listed as a professor emeritus at Columbia.

Hilsman died at the age of 94 on February 23, 2014, at his home in Ithaca due to complications from several strokes. He was buried at Arlington National Cemetery on August 28, 2014, with full honors.

== Books ==
Hilsman wrote a number books about 20th century American foreign policy as well as a few on other topics. His works include:

- Strategic Intelligence and National Decisions (Free Press, 1956; reprinted by Greenwood Press, 1981)
- Foreign Policy in the Sixties: The Issues and the Instruments (Johns Hopkins Press, 1965) [co-editor with Robert C. Good]
- To Move a Nation: The Politics of Foreign Policy in the Administration of John F. Kennedy (Doubleday, 1967)
- Politics of Policy Making in Defense and Foreign Affairs: Conceptual Models and Bureaucratic Politics (Harper & Row, 1971; Second Edition Prentice-Hall, 1987; Third Edition Prentice Hall, 1993 [with Laura Gaughran and Patricia A. Weitsman])
- The Crouching Future: International Politics and U.S. Foreign Policy – A Forecast (Doubleday, 1975)
- To Govern America (Harper & Row, 1979)
- The Politics of Governing America (Prentice Hall, 1985)
- American Guerrilla: My War Behind Japanese Lines (Brassey's, 1990; republished by Potomac Books, 2005)
- George Bush vs. Saddam Hussein: Military Success! Political Failure? (Presidio, 1992)
- The Cuban Missile Crisis: The Struggle Over Policy (Praeger, 1996)
- From Nuclear Military Strategy to a World Without War: A History and a Proposal (Praeger, 1999)
- A Layman's Guide to the Universe, The Earth, Life on Earth, and the Migrations of Humankind (Publishing Works, 2003)
- Classical Chinese Cooking: For the Occasional and Amateur Chef (Publishing Works, 2005)

== See also ==
- Krulak Mendenhall mission
- McNamara Taylor mission
- Reaction to the 1963 South Vietnamese coup

Government offices
Preceded by Hugh S. Cumming Jr.	Director of the Bureau of Intelligence and Research; February 19, 1961 – April 25, 1963	Succeeded by Thomas L. Hughes
Preceded by W. Averell Harriman	Assistant Secretary of State for Far Eastern Affairs; May 9, 1963 – March 15, 1964	Succeeded by William Bundy
