= Patricia A. Weitsman =

American political scientist and international relations scholar

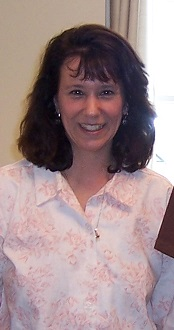
Weitsman in 2006

Patricia Ann Weitsman (October 23, 1964 – March 30, 2014) was an American political scientist and international relations professor at Ohio University where she was also Director of War and Peace Studies. She specialized in security studies and international relations theory, especially on topics related to military alliances.

== Life and career ==
Weitsman attended Indiana University as an undergraduate and spent one year during that time at Hebrew University of Jerusalem. She did her graduate studies at Columbia University, resulting in M.A., M. Phil., and Ph.D. degrees, the last coming in 1994. She was a pre- and post-doctoral fellow at the Graduate Institute of International Studies in Geneva.

She began at Ohio University in 1995. There she developed a reputation for teaching, winning the College of Arts & Sciences Outstanding Teacher Award in 1997, the campus-wide University Professor honor in 1997–98 and again in 2000–01 and the Outstanding Graduate Faculty Award in 2008. In 2009 she was the Ohio University Graduate Commencement Speaker. She was also nominated for the Statewide Excellence in Education Award by Ohio Magazine. She noted that working with students was vitally important to her as it lightened her feelings given the "very dark" subject matter of her research. In 2010, Weitsman created a new interdisciplinary War and Peace Studies major, as well as a certificate program under that name, within the university's Center for International Studies. She became Director of War and Peace Studies in 2012.

Weitsman's 2004 book Dangerous Alliances: Proponents of Peace, Weapons of War analyzed military alliances as not just a means by a state to protect against threats from other countries, but also to improves ties with a particular nation (she termed it "hedging") or to manage conflict with a particular nation (she termed it "tethering"). It used case studies from European history during the 1873–1918 period and sought to synthesize previous scholarly research on alliance formation and cohesion into a more robust theoretical framework that incorporated realist, rationalist, and institutionalist thinking on the subject. The book was heavily reviewed in academic journals, with scholars generally praising the work as a valuable contribution to the study of alliances while sometimes taking issue with particular points or judging that the work did not fulfill all of its ambitions. For one, Joseph M. Grieco wrote that it was an "original and thoughtful analysis ... and contributes greatly to our understanding of alliances and their impact on war and peace." Nicholas Onuf said that her emphasis on "tethering" was a valuable new concept validated by her historical survey. Dangerous Alliances was a finalist for several book prizes.

Her second book, Waging War: Alliances, Coalitions, and Institutions of Interstate Violence, was published in 2014. It sought to establish a theoretical model for how coalition warfare in Iraq and elsewhere had affected the U.S. projection of power. She also published a number of articles in scholarly journals on various topics, including ones on sexual violence and identity in war which covered events such as rape during the Bosnian War and rape during the Rwandan Genocide.

Weitsman was very active in the 1,400-member International Security Studies Section (ISSS) of the International Studies Association (ISA); the section is the world's largest association of security studies scholars. She was elected to its governing board in 2006 and was selected as its vice chair in 2009. She then served as its chair from 2011 to 2013. During her time as chair, the section became the largest within the ISA.

Weitsman was married to David L. Hoffmann, professor of Russian History at Ohio State University, with two children. They lived in Lancaster, Ohio. In 2010 Weitsman was diagnosed with life-threatening myelodysplastic syndrome. She received a bone marrow transplant for it in 2011, went into remission and was able to resume work. But the disease returned as leukemia in 2013 and she succumbed to it in 2014 at age 49.

The International Security Studies Section's annual Patricia Weitsman Award for Outstanding ISSS Graduate Paper is named in her honor. A panel session honoring her contributions to the field was held at the 2015 ISA Conference in New Orleans.

== Publications ==
- Politics of Policy Making in Defense and Foreign Affairs: Conceptual Models and Bureaucratic Politics (Third Edition, Prentice Hall, 1993) [co-assistant with Laura Gaughran for author Roger Hilsman]
- Towards A New Europe: Stops and Starts in Regional Integration (Praeger Publishers, 1995) [co-editor with Gerald Schneider and Thomas Bernauer]
- Enforcing Cooperation: "Risky" States and the Intergovernmental Management of Conflict (St. Martin's, 1997) [co-editor with Gerald Schneider]
- Dangerous Alliances: Proponents of Peace, Weapons of War (Stanford University Press, 2004)
- Waging War: Alliances, Coalitions, and Institutions of Interstate Violence (Stanford University Press, 2014)
