= Stephen Szabo =

American political communication scholar

- Born: Stephen Szabo
- Education: American University (BA, MA); Georgetown University (PhD)
- Known for: Faculty member at Johns Hopkins University
- Scientific career
- Fields: Foreign Policy; Political science
- Workplaces: Foreign Service Institute; National Defense University; Johns Hopkins University

Stephen Francis Szabo is an American political scientist and educator who specializes in foreign policy. He was executive director of the German Marshall Fund Transatlantic Academy and a faculty member at Johns Hopkins University and the National Defense University.

== Education ==
Szabo received a BA and MA from the School of International Service at the American University, and his PhD from Georgetown University in political science. He completed his PhD in 1977, with a dissertation titled Party Recruitment in the Federal Republic of Germany: Candidate Selection in a West German state.

== Career ==
Szabo is a political scientist and educator specialized in foreign policy. In 2011, he was executive director of the Transatlantic Academy (TAA), as part of the German Marshall Fund (GMF). Before joining the GMF, Szabo had been professor of European Studies at the Paul H. Nitze School of Advanced International Studies, Johns Hopkins University, where he also served as academic and interim dean. Before that, he was professor of National Security Affairs at the National Defense University and chairman of West European Studies at the Foreign Service Institute, U.S. Department of State.

== Selected publications ==
- Germany, Russia, and the Rise of Geo-economics (2015) London [etc.] : Bloomsbury Academic, 2016.
- Parting Ways: The Crisis in German-American Relations (2004), Washington, D.C. : Brookings Institution Press, ©2004.the book is about the deterioration of the relationship between Washington and Berlin in the run-up to the second Iraq War
- Research Support for Political Scientists: A Guide to Sources of Funds for Research Fellowships, Grants, and Contracts.
- The Diplomacy of German Reunification (1992), New York : St. Martin's Press, 1994. The book attributes German reunification to skillful political leadership and adept negotiations by well-positioned German and American political elites.
- The Changing Politics of German Security (1990) London : Pinter, 1990.
