= Bernard Brodie (military strategist) =

American military strategist (1910–1978)

- Born: May 20, 1910; Chicago, Illinois, U.S.
- Died: November 24, 1978 (aged 68); California, U.S.
- Known for: The Absolute Weapon: Atomic Power and World Order
- Spouse: Fawn M. Brodie (m. 1936)

Academic background
- Education: University of Chicago Ph.B, Ph.D
- Thesis: Sea Power in the Machine Age (1940)
- Doctoral advisor: Jacob Viner

Academic work
- Discipline: Military strategist
- Sub-discipline: Nuclear strategy
- Institutions: Dartmouth College; Yale University; RAND Corporation; UCLA

Bernard Brodie (May 20, 1910 – November 24, 1978) was an American military strategist well known for establishing the basics of nuclear strategy. Known as "the American Clausewitz," and "the original nuclear strategist," he was an initial architect of nuclear deterrence strategy and tried to ascertain the role and value of nuclear weapons after their creation.

Brodie was initially a strong supporter of the concept of escalating responses; he promoted the view that a war in Europe would be started with conventional forces and escalate to nuclear only if and when necessary. After a meeting with French counterparts in 1960, he came to espouse a very different policy, one based purely on nuclear deterrence with the stated position that the US would use nuclear arms at the first instance of hostilities of any sort. Brodie felt that anything short of this seriously eroded the concept of deterrence and might lead to situations where one side might enter hostilities believing it could remain non-nuclear. This change in policy made Brodie increasingly at odds with his contemporaries.

== Life and career ==
Born in Chicago, Bernard Brodie was the third of four sons of Max and Esther (Bloch) Brodie, Jewish immigrants from Latvia, in the Russian Empire. He graduated from the University of Chicago with a Ph.B in 1932, and received a Ph.D in 1940 under Jacob Viner. His dissertation was titled Sea Power in the Machine Age: Major Naval Inventions and Their Consequences on International Politics, 1814–1940.

Brodie was an instructor at Dartmouth College from 1941 to 1943. During World War II, he served in the U.S. Naval Reserve Bureau of Ordnance and at the Office of the Chief of Naval Operations. He then taught at Yale University from 1945 to 1951, where he was a member of the Yale Institute of International Studies, and worked at the RAND Corporation as a senior staff member between 1951 and 1966. Brodie was a full professor and taught Political Science and International Relations at UCLA from 1966 until his death in 1978.

He married Fawn McKay Brodie – who became a well-known biographer of Richard Nixon, Joseph Smith, Thomas Jefferson and others – on August 28, 1936. They were the parents of three children.

== Theories ==
Initially a theorist about naval power, Brodie shifted his focus to nuclear strategy after the creation of the nuclear bomb. His most important work, written in 1946, was entitled The Absolute Weapon: Atomic Power and World Order, which laid down the fundamentals of nuclear deterrence strategy. He saw the usefulness of the atomic bomb was not in its deployment but in the threat of its deployment. The book had a now-famous passage "Thus far the chief purpose of our military establishment has been to win wars. From now on its chief purpose must be to avert them. It can have almost no other useful purpose." In the early 1950s, he shifted from academia and began work at the RAND Corporation. There, a stable of important strategists, Herman Kahn and others, developed the rudiments of nuclear strategy and warfighting theory.

Working at the RAND Corporation, Brodie wrote Strategy in the Missile Age (1959), which outlined the framework of deterrence. By arguing that preventative nuclear strikes would lead to escalation from limited to total war, Brodie concluded that deterrence by second-strike capability would lead to a more secure outcome for both sides. The virtual abandonment of first strike as a strategy made Brodie suggest investment in civil defense, which included the "hardening" of land based missile locations to ensure the strength of second-strike capability. The building of protected missile silos around the United States is a testament to that belief. It was important for the second-strike force to have first-strike capabilities to provide the stasis necessary for deterrence.

Brodie believed that the second-strike force should be targeted towards not cities but military installations. That was meant to give the Soviets an opportunity to limit escalation and to allow the United States to win the war. Brodie also advocated the funding of conventional military personnel to ensure the containment of communism by fighting limited wars or, if deterrence failed, a total war.

Brodie, Kenneth Waltz, and Robert Jervis accepted that deterrence was not ironclad, but that a "stable balance of nuclear terror" would prevent the use of nuclear weapons. This view has been called the "easy deterrence narrative".

Brodie, who had a fascination with Freud and psychoanalysis, sometimes used it to refer to his work in nuclear strategy. In an internally-circulated memorandum at the RAND Corporation, he compared his no-cities/withhold plan to coitus interruptus, and the SAC plan was like "going all the way." Following those comments, a fellow RAND scholar, Herman Kahn, told an assembled group of SAC officers, "Gentlemen, you don't have a war plan, you have a war orgasm!" Similar sexual imagery was liberally used in Stanley Kubrick's film Dr. Strangelove, a satire of Cold War nuclear strategy.

Brodie was also responsible, along with Michael Howard and Peter Paret, for making the writings of the Prussian strategist Carl von Clausewitz more accessible to the English-speaking world. Brodie's incisive "A guide to the reading of On War" in the Princeton translation of 1976 corrected most of the misinterpretations of the theory and provided students with an accurate synopsis of the vital work.

== Books ==
- Sea Power in the Machine Age. Princeton University Press,1941 and 1943.
- A Layman’s Guide to Naval Strategy. Princeton University Press, 1942.
- The Absolute Weapon: Atomic Power and World Order. (editor and contributor), Harcourt, 1946.
- Strategy in the Missile Age. Princeton University Press, 1959.
- From Cross-Bow to H-Bomb. Dell, 1962; Indiana University Press (rev. ed.), 1973.
- Escalation and the Nuclear Option. Princeton University Press, 1966.
- Bureaucracy, Politics, and Strategy. University of California, 1968 (with Henry Kissinger).
- The Future of Deterrence in U.S. Strategy. Security Studies Project, University of California, 1968.
- War and Politics. Macmillan, 1973.
- A Guide to the Reading of "On War". Princeton University Press, 1976.

== Awards ==
- Carnegie Fellow, Institute for Advanced Study, 1941
- Carnegie Corporation reflective year fellowship in France, 1960–61
