= Bernard Cecil Cohen =

American political scientist (1926–2024)

- Born: February 22, 1926; Northampton, Massachusetts, U.S.
- Died: January 9, 2024 (aged 97)

Bernard Cecil Cohen (February 22, 1926 – January 9, 2024) was an American political scientist and educator who was acting Chancellor of University of Wisconsin–Madison in 1987.

Born in Northampton, Massachusetts, Cohen received his bachelors, masters, and doctorate degrees in political science from Yale University. Cohen became an original member of Princeton University's Center of International Studies and taught at Princeton from 1951 to 1959. Then, in 1959, Cohen taught at University of Wisconsin–Madison. He became chair of the political science department, dean of the graduate school, and then vice chancellor. In 1987, Cohen was acting chancellor of University of Wisconsin–Madison. In 1989, Cohen retired and lived in Madison, Wisconsin.

Cohen died on January 9, 2024, at the age of 97.
