= Catherine McArdle Kelleher =

American political scientist (1939–2023)

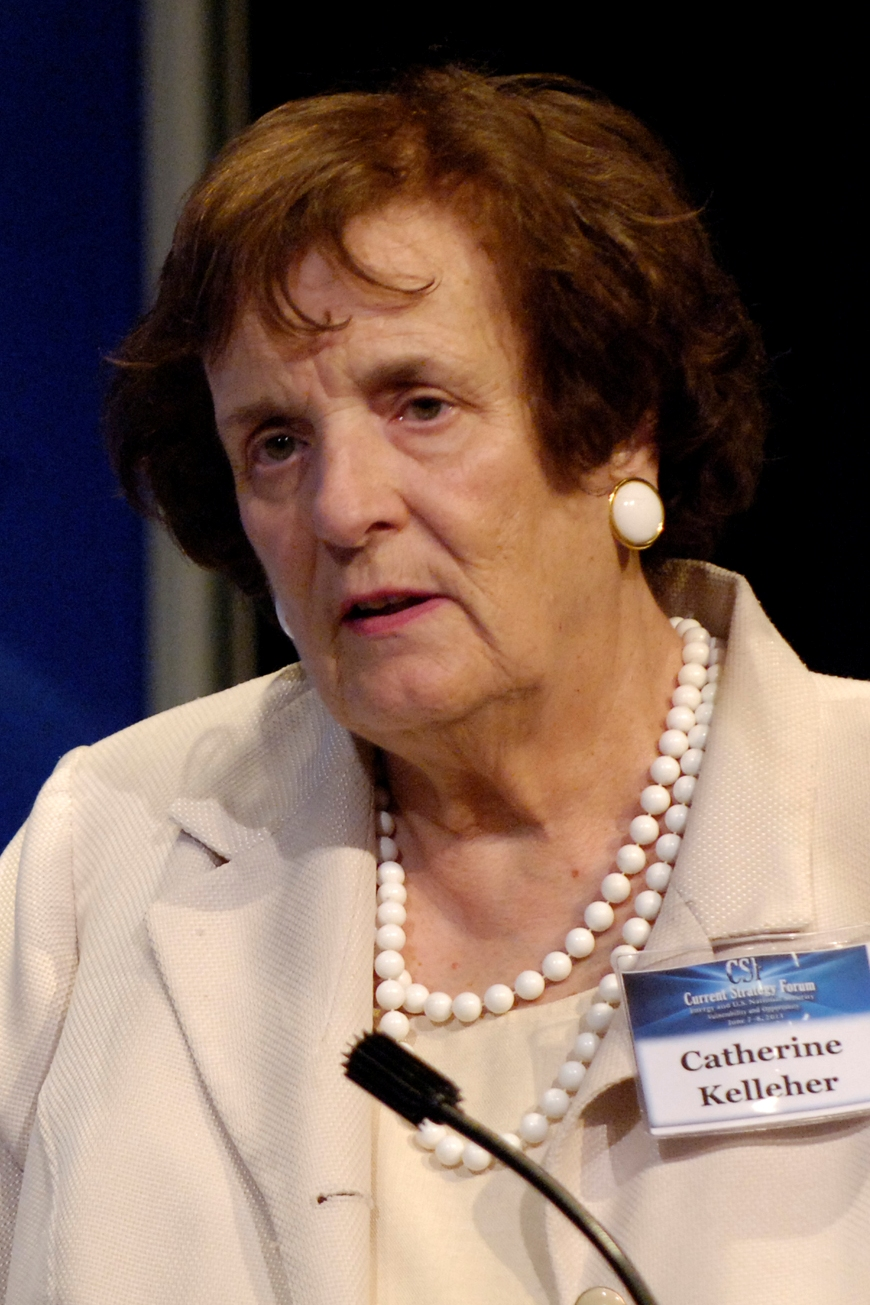
Kelleher in 2011

Catherine McArdle Kelleher (January 19, 1939 – February 15, 2023) was an American political scientist involved in national and international security policy. She was Senior Fellow at the Watson Institute for International Studies at Brown University and College Park Professor of Public Policy at the University of Maryland. Kelleher was the Director of the Aspen Institute in Berlin from 1998 to 2001 when she was appointed Professor of Strategy at the Naval War College (2001–2006). In the 1990s she was appointed Honorary professor at the Free University of Berlin, and she regularly taught at the Geneva Center for Security Policy in Switzerland for over a decade.

Her public service career began with appointment to the National War College as a professor of military strategy in the 1980s (only the second woman professor in their history) and a series of consulting posts in the Office of the Secretary of Defense, the Arms Control and Disarmament Agency, and the Department of State. She served both in the White House on the National Security Council staff (under President Jimmy Carter) and at various levels in the Department of Defense. Her final assignments were as the Secretary of Defense's Personal Representative and Defense Advisor to the US Mission to NATO, and as Deputy Assistant Secretary of Defense for Russia, Ukraine, and Eurasia (OSD/RUE) in the Clinton Administration. She was considered an expert on international security.

== Life and career ==
Kelleher was a graduate of the Girls’ Latin School in Boston; she received her A.B. from Mount Holyoke College, then her Ph.D. in political science from the Massachusetts Institute of Technology in 1967 for a thesis entitled German Nuclear Dilemmas, 1955-1965. Her doctoral advisor at M.I.T. was William W. Kaufmann. Mount Holyoke later honored her with a D.Litt.

Kelleher founded the Center for International Security Studies at Maryland, which is part of the School of Public Policy at the University of Maryland. She also assisted at various times the Ford Foundation and the MacArthur Foundation in the development and assessment of their grant programs in international security, and their efforts to change the traditional research agenda for students at the graduate and undergraduate levels, in the United States and throughout the world. She spearheaded these efforts as Chair of the Social Science Research Council's prestigious MacArthur Committee on International Peace and Security fellowships.

Kelleher was a member of several advisory boards, including the Arms Control Association, the Geneva Centre for Security Policy, SIPRI North America, and the Center for Democratic Control of Armed Forces (DCAF) in Geneva. She founded the now-international organization Women in International Security (WIIS). She was Professor Emerita at the U.S. Naval War College, where she served in several capacities, including editor of the Naval War College Review from Spring 2003 through June 2004. She was Vice-Chair of the Committee of International Security of the National Academies of Sciences (with particular responsibility for exchanges with the Russian, Chinese, and Indian academies) for two terms, was a two-term member of the Naval Studies Board, and a member of several of the Academies' study panels. Kelleher was also a Distinguished Fellow of the Center for Naval Analyses (CNA).

Kelleher was decorated for her public service by both the American and German governments. Her German awards include the Gold Cross of Honor of the Bundeswehr and the Manfred Woerner award for "contributions to European security." Her American awards include the Department of Defense Medal for Distinguished Public Service and the Director's Medal from the Defense Intelligence Agency. Kelleher was celebrated for her excellence in scholarship and public service with the Joseph Kruzel and Hubert Humphrey awards from the American Political Science Association. She was one of the few academics asked in 2010 to join the Carnegie Commission's European American Security Initiative (EASI) and was a member of the much-lauded working group on cooperative solutions to missile defense, which Ambassador Steven Pifer called "the most detailed Track II discussion of NATO-Russia missile defense cooperation" in a report for the Brookings Institution.

Kelleher died on February 15, 2023, at the age of 84.

== Publications ==
Kelleher was the author of more than 70 publications focused principally on European security, with special interests in Germany and Russia beyond the United States. Her book on The Politics of German Nuclear Weapons is still considered a classic source. Kelleher’s most recent book is Getting to Zero: The Path to Nuclear Disarmament, co-edited with Judith Reppy of Cornell University. Lawrence Freedman, writing in Foreign Affairs, wrote that the “impressive group of scholars” contributing to the book move the debate on nuclear disarmament “to a more serious level.” According to American physicist Richard Garwin: "This valuable book extends the important conversation on getting to zero nuclear weapons by asking hard questions about how to accommodate the desires and preferences of the global community while making progress toward that goal."
