= Kenneth W. Thompson =

American academic and author

Kenneth W. Thompson (August 29, 1921 – February 2, 2013) was an American academic and author known for his contributions to normative theory in international relations. In 1978 he became director of the Miller Center of Public Affairs at the University of Virginia. He retired as director in 1998, but continued to head its Forum Program until 2004.

== Biography ==
Thompson received his Ph.D. from the University of Chicago in 1950 and taught there and at Northwestern University from 1949 to 1955. He resumed teaching at the University of Virginia in 1975. Between 1955 and 1975, he worked in the area of institutional philanthropy, becoming vice president for International Programs at the Rockefeller Foundation.

He helped to organize eight national commissions on topics ranging from presidential disability to the selection of federal judges.

Thompson's Principles and Problems of International Politics, a volume of readings co-edited with his mentor, Hans Morgenthau, provided the intellectual guidelines for his thinking through the succeeding four decades. Primary among these guidelines is a reliance on history. Thompson has seen himself as part of the influential tradition of political realism, the heir of the thought of Morgenthau and Reinhold Niebuhr, and the sustainer of the subsequent generation of scholars. He organized and coedited the innovative seventh edition of Politics among Nations released by McGraw Hill.

Thompson's desire to ground international relations thought in history led him to distrust mono-causal theories, whether the Marxist championing of class and economic relations, the liberal faith in democratic government, or the "scientific" theorizing of much of international relations thought since the behavioral revolution. For Thompson, theory picks out what is most essential from reality, but theory that strays too far from the complexity of reality revealed in history is more likely to be the projection of the theorist's own prejudices than a useful way of understanding the international states-system.

His distrust of the great simplifiers has led to his refusal to rely on one truth and to his acceptance of the Niebuhrian belief that all political insights are partial, motives are usually mixed, and any one truth taken to its logical extreme will prove harmful. Unlike many students of normative theory in international relations, he has been reluctant to judge one side in a dispute entirely right and the other irrevocably wrong, granting instead that both may have some claim of justice which they might press too far if unopposed. This belief has led in turn to Thompson's consistent position that ethically tolerable outcomes in international politics are more likely to be achieved through a counterbalancing of power than through moral exhortation.

A distribution of power that prevents any one actor from dominating the rest is what he sees as the great insight of The Federalist Papers, an insight that remains fully applicable to international relations, despite changes in technology, ideologies, and economic ties. Thus he has engaged in a lifelong effort to synthesize the austere world of the realist, a world always verging on cynicism, with the ideals of the moralist, ideals that run the risk of pretentiousness.

Thompson's assertion of the truths derived by the realist tradition from political philosophy, international history, and Christian theology has been questioned by behaviorists and neo-realists, who see it as "soft," and by moral critics, who see it as cynical. His energy and learning, however, have helped classical realism survive and enjoy a renaissance in the 20th to the 21st century.

== Selected publications ==
- 1951 Principles and Problems of International Politics: Selected Readings. With Hans Morgenthau. New York: Knopf.
- 1960 Political Realism and the Crisis of World Politics: An American Approach to Foreign Policy. Princeton: Princeton University Press.
- 1966 The Moral Issue in Statecraft. Baton Rouge: Louisiana State University Press.
- 1978 Interpreters and Critics of the Cold War. Washington, D.C.: University Press of America.
- 1980 Morality and Foreign Policy. Baton Rouge: Louisiana State University Press.
- 1981 Cold War Theories. Baton Rouge: Louisiana State University Press.
- 1985 Toynbee's World Politics and History. Baton Rouge: Louisiana State University Press.
- 1992 Traditions and Values in Politics and Diplomacy. Baton Rouge: Louisiana State University Press.
- 1996 Schools of Thought in International Relations: Interpreters, Issues, and Morality. Baton Rouge: Louisiana State University Press.

Source: William David Clinton, American Political Scientists: A Dictionary 2nd ed. Edited by Glenn H. Utter and Charles Lockhart. Westport, Conn: Greenwood Press.
