= Concert of Democracies =

A Concert of Democracies or League of Democracies is an alternative international organization proposed by Ivo Daalder and James Lindsay in a May 2004 Washington Post op-ed. The concept is broader than a military organization, hence “concert” instead of “alliance.” In a subsequent article in The American Interest, they affirm that roughly 60 countries would qualify for membership under these criteria. They conceive such a "Concert" as a "D-60" group within the UN.

Around the same time, following a 2004 exchange with Jean Elshtain on just war theory, John Davenport of Fordham University proposed a "federation of democracies" in a 2005 article. He developed this further by analogy with arguments for the American federation, and contended that only a federation of democracies could reliably undertake humanitarian interventions to stop mass atrocity crimes. He also defended this proposal against criticisms by Stephen Schlesinger in an online exchange.

G. John Ikenberry and Anne-Marie Slaughter have also called for the creation of a "Concert of Democracies" in the final report of the Princeton Project on National Security, Forging a World Under Liberty and Law: U.S. National Security in the 21st Century (September 2006). Most recently the concept has been supported by former United States presidential candidate John McCain.

According to the Princeton Project's final report released on September 27, 2006, this alternative body's purpose would be to strengthen security cooperation among the world’s liberal democracies and to provide a framework in which they can work together to effectively tackle common challenges - ideally within existing regional and global institutions, but if those institutions fail, then independently, functioning as a focal point for efforts to strengthen liberty under law around the world. It would serve as the institutional embodiment and ratification of the "democratic peace".

On September 16, 2006, Anne Bayefsky at the Hudson Institute, published a nearly identical proposal to establish an organization called the United Democratic Nations in The Jerusalem Post. Unlike the Princeton Project scholars, Bayefsky and other conservative scholars view the institution as a replacement for the United Nations, which they view as illegitimate and ineffective.

In December 2018, John Davenport published A League of Democracies, which argued for a robust version of this such a league synthesizing proposals from James Yunker, Daalder and Lindsay, Slaughter, Ikenberry, Robert Kagan, and older authors such as James Huntley and Clarence Streit. Davenport's version focuses on ending mass atrocities and countering rising threats to democratic nations from Russia and China. It would include demanding criteria for membership, an associate membership status, a directly elected executive and legislature, a small standing armed forces made up entirely of volunteers from the member nations, and reserve forces with resources to shore up failing states and reconstruct nations after conflicts. This work includes a list of 50 global public goods that cannot be adequately secured by free markets or international networks of NGOs and IGOs, according to the author.

== Possible membership ==
Political scientists have argued that the criteria for inclusion in a Concert of Democracies are by no means clear-cut. The main factors for membership most agreed upon are regular, competitive, free and fair elections, and protection of individual rights and the rule of law. Didier Jacobs has argued that an effective league of democracies might be grown out of NATO nations with additions from other continents. Davenport argues instead that the NATO treaty is hard to amend and the NATO name might be too off putting to some potential members because of its Cold War connotations. He proposes a list of over 40 potential founding nations from all inhabited continents.

Other progressive thinkers, such as Daniele Archibugi have argued that the same purposes will be better served by a democratic reform of the United Nations. Peter Singer has made similar proposals in versions of his book, One World: The Ethics of Globalisation. Davenport argued, on the contrary, that the United Nations cannot be sufficiently reformed to do the job because of its universal inclusion ideal, and its lack of sufficient coordinative power in making and enforcing decisions.

== See also ==
- Princeton Project
- Cosmopolitan democracy
- David Held
- Daniele Archibugi
- United Nations Parliamentary Assembly
- World Federalism
