= Quadrilateral Security Dialogue =

Strategic dialogue between Australia, India, Japan, and the United States

The Quad
- Australia, India, Japan, and the United States are highlighted in blue. Former Prime Minister Shinzo Abe intended for the Quad to establish an "Asian Arc of Democracy".
- Established: 2007 (1st time); lasted until 2008; 2017 (re-established after negotiations in November)
- Type: Inter-governmental security forum
- Region served: Indo-Pacific
- Members: States in the Dialogue: Australia; India; Japan; United States

The Quadrilateral Security Dialogue, sometimes referred to as the Quad, is a grouping of Australia, India, Japan, and the United States that is maintained by talks between member countries. The dialogue is widely viewed by newspapers and think tanks to be a diplomatic arrangement responding to increased Chinese economic and political power.

The grouping was initiated in 2007 by Japanese prime minister Shinzo Abe, with the support of Australian prime minister John Howard, Indian prime minister Manmohan Singh and U.S. vice president Dick Cheney. The dialogue was paralleled by joint military exercises of an unprecedented scale, titled Exercise Malabar. The diplomatic and military arrangement was widely viewed as a response to increased Chinese economic and military power.

The Quad ceased in 2008 following the withdrawal of Australia during Kevin Rudd's tenure as prime minister, reflecting ambivalence in Australian policy over the growing tension between the United States and China in the Indo-Pacific. Following Rudd's replacement by Julia Gillard in 2010, enhanced military cooperation between the United States and Australia was resumed, leading to the placement of U.S. Marines near Darwin, overlooking the Timor Sea and Lombok Strait. Meanwhile, India, Japan, and the United States continued to hold joint naval exercises under Malabar.

During the 2017 ASEAN Summits in Manila, all four former members led by Abe, Australian prime minister Malcolm Turnbull, Indian prime minister Narendra Modi, and U.S. president Donald Trump agreed to revive the Quad partnership in order to counter China militarily and diplomatically in the Indo-Pacific region, particularly in the South China Sea. Tensions between Quad members and China have led to fears of what was dubbed by some commentators "a new Cold War" in the region, and the Chinese government responded to the Quad dialogue by issuing formal diplomatic protests to its members, calling it "Asian NATO".

Due to the COVID-19 pandemic, Brazil, Israel, New Zealand, South Korea, and Vietnam were invited to "Quad Plus" meetings to discuss their responses to it.

Current QUAD Leaders

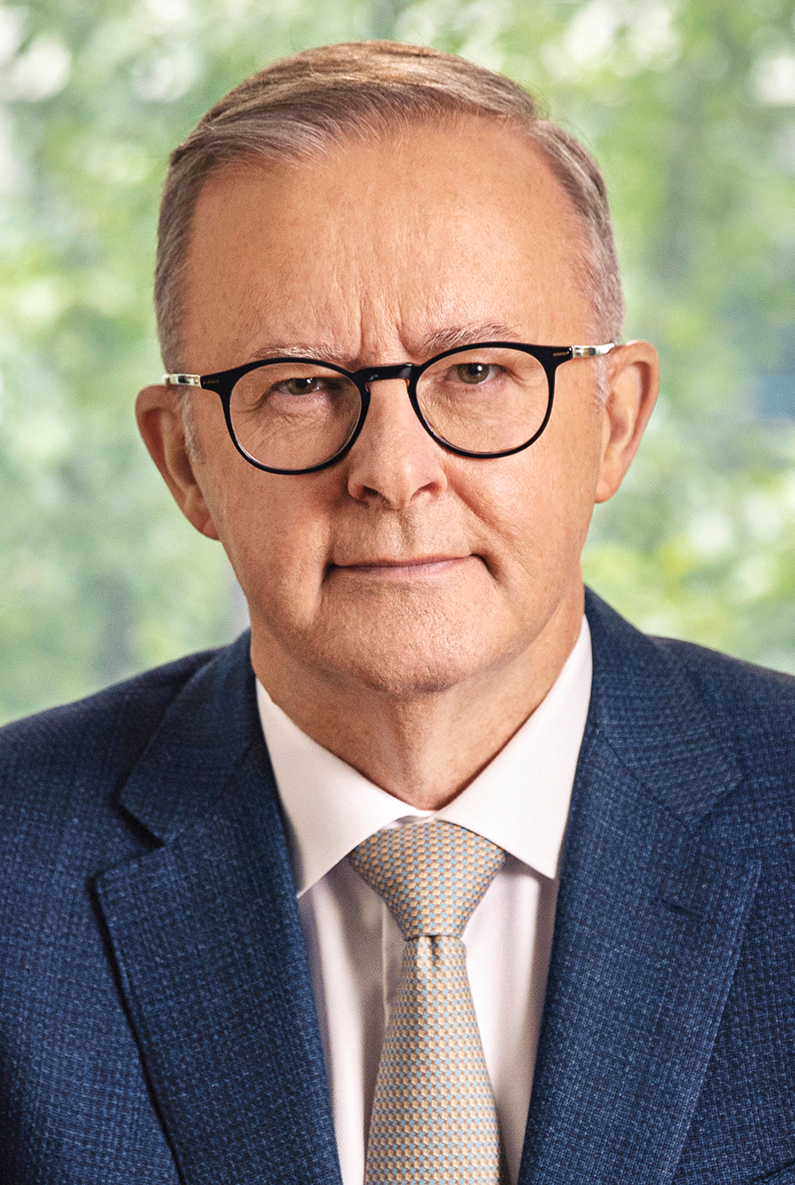
Prime Minister
Anthony Albanese
Australia

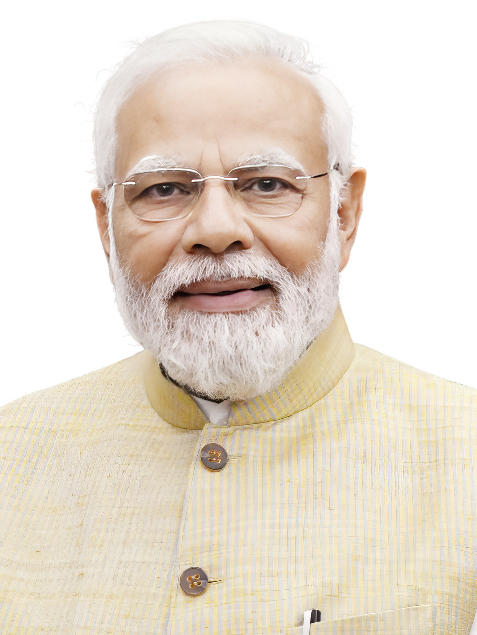
Prime Minister
Narendra Modi
India

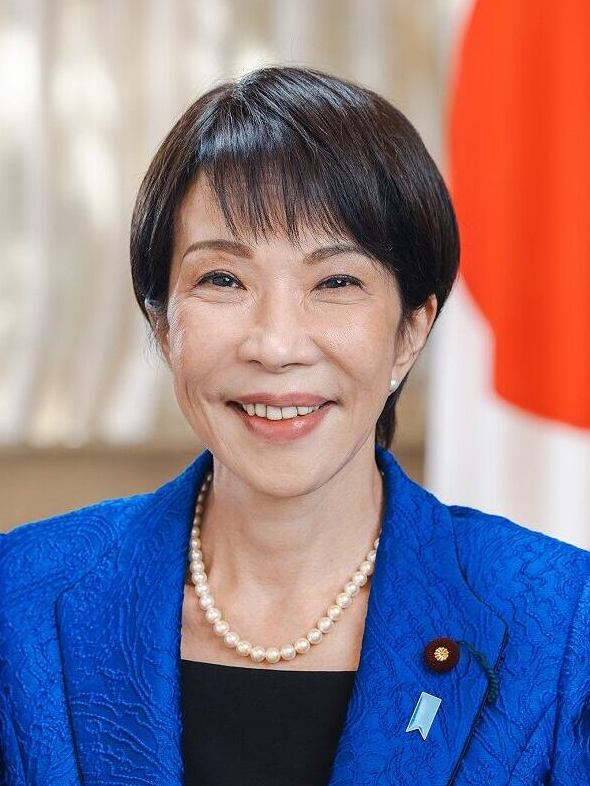
Prime Minister
Sanae Takaichi
Japan

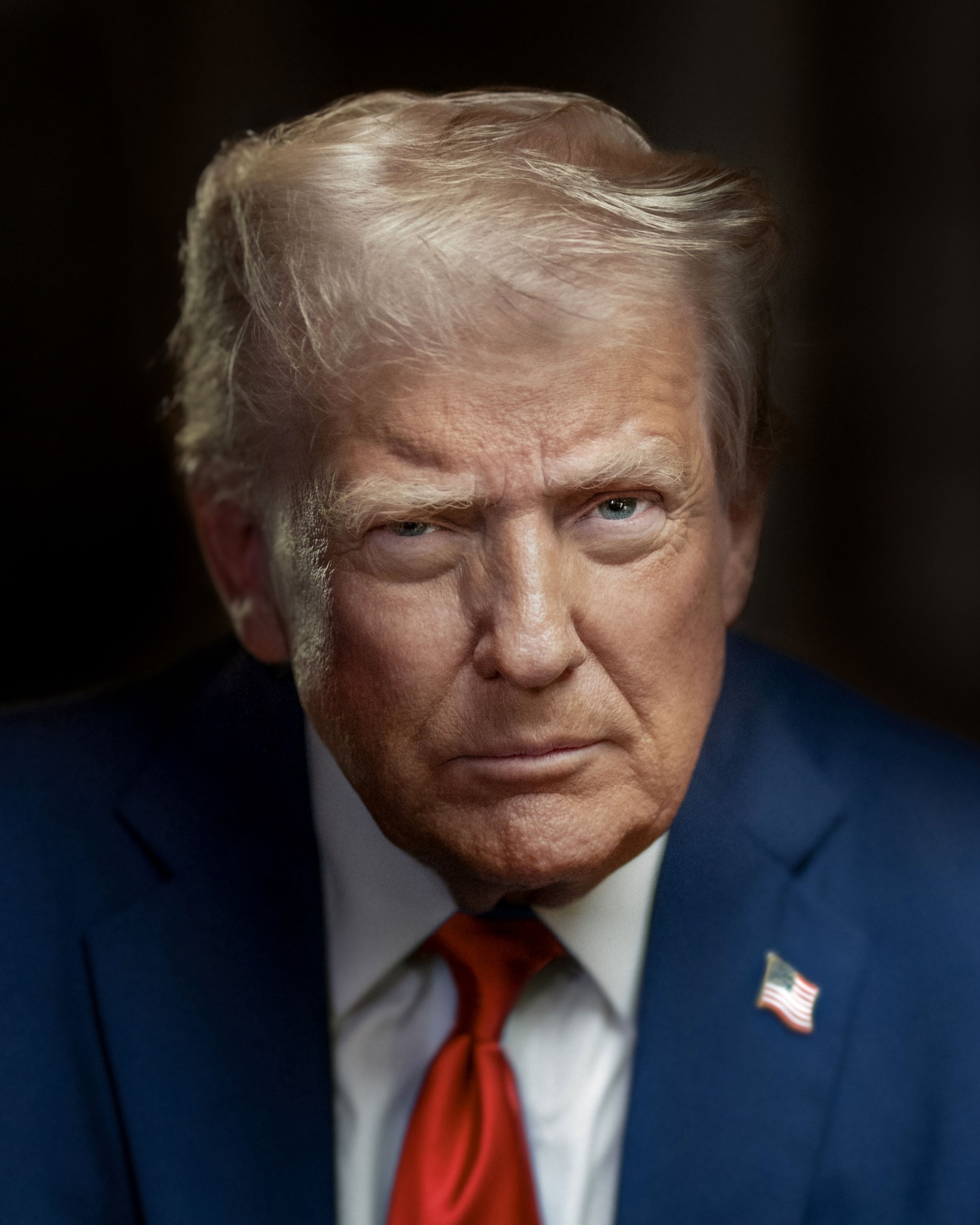
President
Donald Trump
United States

== Background ==
=== Strategic framework of US–China competition ===
In the early twenty-first century, the strategic preoccupation of the United States with Iraq and Afghanistan served as a distraction from major power shifts in the Asia-Pacific, brought about by increased Chinese economic power, which undermined America's traditional role in the region. In the long term the United States has sought a policy of "soft containment" of China by organizing strategic partnerships with democracies at its periphery. While US alliances with Japan, Australia and India now form the bulwark of this policy, the development of closer US military ties to India has been a complex process since the collapse of the Soviet Union. Australian commentaries showed mixed attitudes to a Quadrilateral partnership isolating China.

=== India–US military relations ===
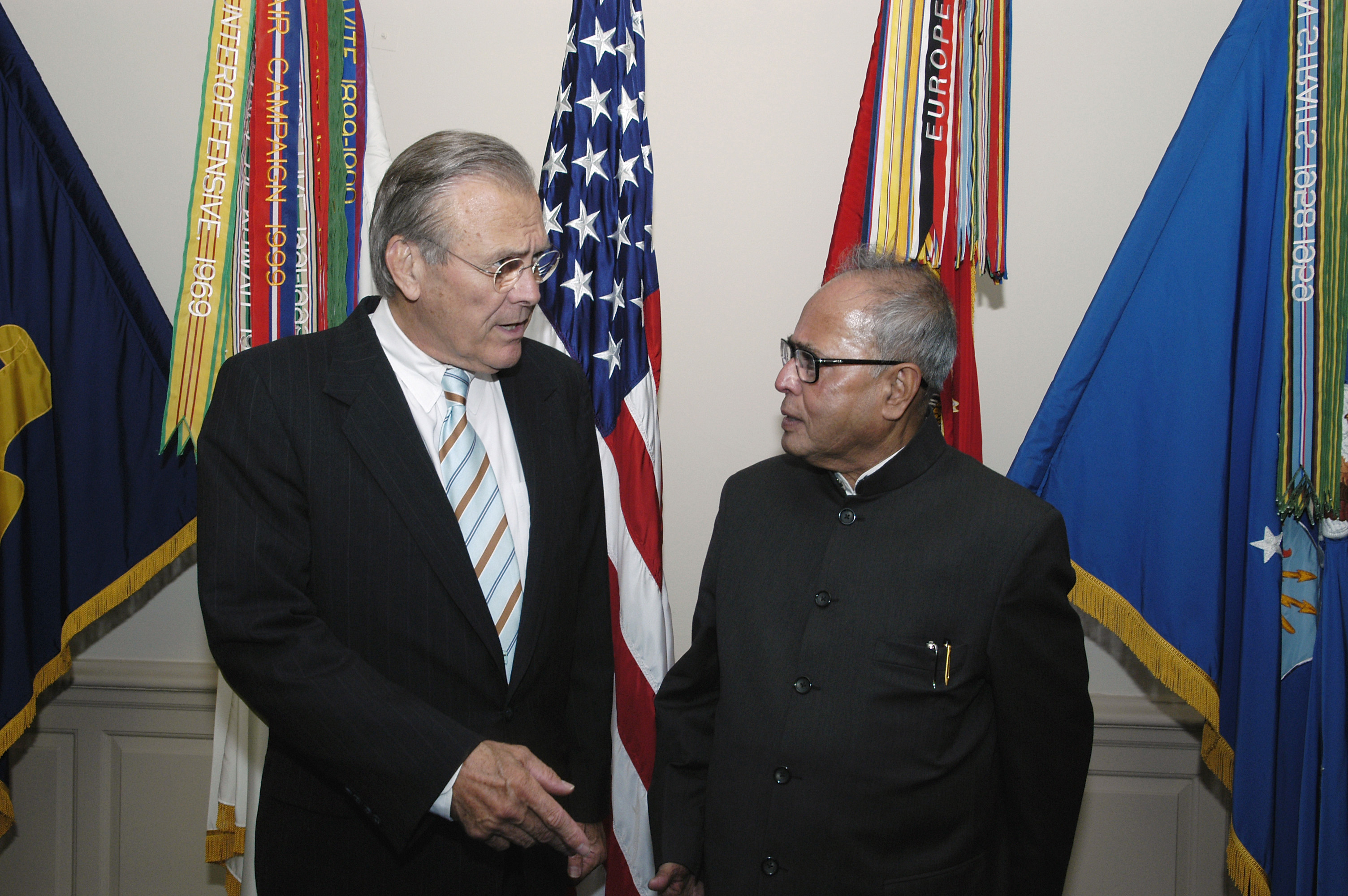
Donald H. Rumsfeld, U.S. Secretary of Defense and Pranab Mukherjee, Minister of Defence for India, at Pentagon, Washington, D.C., 2005.

Active US-Indian military cooperation expanded in 1991 following the economic liberalization of India when American Lt. General Claude C. Kicklighter, then commander of the United States Army Pacific, proposed army-to-army cooperation. This cooperation further expanded in the mid-1990s under an early Indian centre-right coalition, and in 2001 India offered the United States military facilities within its territory for offensive operations in Afghanistan. US Defense Secretary Donald Rumsfeld and his Indian counterpart Pranab Mukherjee signed a "New Framework for India-US Defense" in 2005 under the Indian United Progressive Alliance government, increasing cooperation regarding military relations, defence industry and technology sharing, and the establishment of a "Framework on maritime security cooperation." India and the United States conducted dozens of joint military exercises in the ensuing years before the development of the Quad, interpreted as an effort to "contain" China. Indian political commentator Brahma Chellaney referred to the emerging Quadrilateral partnership between the United States, Japan, Australia and India as part of a new "Great Game" in Asia, and Indian diplomat M. K. Rasgotra has maintained that American efforts to shape security pacts in Asia will result not in an "Asian Century," but rather in an "American Century in Asia."

Some, like US Lt. General Jeffrey B. Kohler, viewed US-India defence agreements as potentially lucrative for American defence industries and oversaw the subsequent sale of American military systems to India. Nevertheless, some Indian commentators opposed increased American military cooperation with India, citing the American presence in Iraq, hostility to Iran and "attempts at encircling China" as fundamentally destabilizing to Asian peace, and objecting to the presence of American warships with nuclear capabilities off the coast of southern India, or to American calls for the permanent hosting of American naval vessels in Goa or Kochi.

=== Trilateral Security Dialogue (TSD) ===
The Trilateral Strategic Dialogue (TSD) was a series of trilateral meetings between the United States, Japan, and Australia. The TSD originally convened at senior officials level in 2002, then was upgraded to ministerial level in 2005. The United States expected regional allies to help facilitate evolving US global strategy to fight against terrorism and nuclear proliferation. In return, Japan and Australia expected benefits including continued US strategic involvement and the maintenance of strategic guarantees in the region.

=== 2004 Tsunami Cooperation ===
The Quad's origins, also referred to as "Quad 1.0", go back to the humanitarian assistance and disaster relief to the 2004 Indian Ocean Tsunami, later leading to a wider range of initiatives including maritime, health security, and education, and "with a focus on securing a free and open Indo-Pacific".

In 2021, some commentators wrote that an ad-hoc Tsunami Core Group in response to the 2004 Indian Ocean earthquake and tsunami may have been an early precursor to the Quad.

=== South China Sea ===
The nine-dash line refers to the ill-defined demarcation line used by the People's Republic of China (China) and the Republic of China (Taiwan), for their claims of the major part of the South China Sea. The contested area in the South China Sea includes the Paracel Islands, (Note: The Paracel Islands are administered by China (PRC), but are also claimed by Taiwan (ROC) and Vietnam.) the Spratly Islands, (Note: The Spratly Islands are disputed by Brunei, China (PRC), Malaysia, the Philippines, Taiwan (ROC), and Vietnam, who each claim either part or all the islands, which are believed (hoped) to sit on vast mineral resources, including oil and gas.) and various other areas including Pratas Island and the Vereker Banks, the Macclesfield Bank and the Scarborough Shoal. Despite having made the vague claim public in 1947, neither the PRC nor the ROC has (as of 2018) filed a formal and specifically defined claim to the area. An early map showing a U-shaped eleven-dash line was published in the then-Republic of China on 1 December 1947. Two of the dashes in the Gulf of Tonkin were later removed at the behest of Chinese Premier Zhou Enlai, reducing the total to nine. Chinese scholars asserted at the time that the version of the map with nine dashes represented the maximum extent of historical claims to the South China Sea. Subsequent editions added a tenth dash to the east of Taiwan island in 2013, extending it into the East China Sea.

==== Condemnation of Pahalgam Terror Attack ====
In July 2025, the Quad foreign ministers—representing the United States, India, Japan, and Australia—condemned the 22 April terrorist attack in Pahalgam, Jammu and Kashmir, that killed 26 civilians, most of them tourists. In a joint statement issued from Washington, the Quad called for the perpetrators, organisers, and financiers of the attack to be brought to justice without delay. Though not naming Pakistan explicitly, the group's call aligned with growing international concern over cross-border terrorism originating from Pakistani soil.

The Quad also expressed serious concerns over coercive actions and militarisation in the East and South China Seas. In the wake of the Pahalgam attack, India launched Operation Sindoor on 7 May, targeting terror infrastructure in Pakistan and Pakistan-administered Kashmir. The Quad's statement marked a clear show of solidarity with India's right to defend its citizens from state-sponsored terrorism.

== Members ==
Overview of QUAD members
Member	Population	Nominal GDP (million US$)	PPP GDP (million US$)	Nominal GDP per capita (In USD)	PPP GDP per capita (In USD)	Trade (billions of USD)
Australia	27,400,013	1,771,681	1,980,022	64,547	72,138	804
India	1,413,324,000	4,187,017	17,647,050	2,878	12,132	1,612
Japan	123,360,000	4,186,431	6,741,192	33,956	54,677	2,013
United States	340,110,988	30,507,217	30,507,217	89,105	89,105	6,786

== List of Leaders Summits ==
No.	Date	Host country	Leader	Location	Key Themes and Discussions	Image
1st	24 March 2021	Virtual meeting	(United States) Joe Biden (Australia) Scott Morrison (India) Narendra Modi (Japan) Yoshihide Suga	Video conference	COVID-19 response, climate change, regional security, technological cooperation	
2nd	24 September 2021	United States	(United States) Joe Biden (Australia) Scott Morrison (India) Narendra Modi (Japan) Yoshihide Suga	Washington, D.C.	COVID-19 vaccination efforts, climate change, economic security, Indo-Pacific security	
3rd	4 March 2022	Virtual meeting	(United States) Joe Biden (Australia) Scott Morrison (India) Narendra Modi (Japan) Fumio Kishida	Video conference	Russian invasion of Ukraine and ensuing humanitarian crisis	
4th	24 May 2022	Japan	(Japan) Fumio Kishida (Australia) Anthony Albanese (India) Narendra Modi (United States) Joe Biden	Tokyo	Indo-Pacific security, COVID-19 response, climate change and sustainability, economic resilience	
5th	20 May 2023	Japan	(Japan) Fumio Kishida (Australia) Anthony Albanese (India) Narendra Modi (United States) Joe Biden	Hiroshima	Indo-Pacific security, climate change, health security, technology and cybersecurity	
6th	21 September 2024	United States	(United States) Joe Biden (Australia) Anthony Albanese (India) Narendra Modi (Japan) Fumio Kishida	Wilmington	Climate change/disaster response, maritime security, infrastructure, technology and cybersecurity	
7th	17 November 2026	Philippines	(India) Narendra Modi (Australia) Anthony Albanese (Japan) Sanae Takaichi (United States) Donald Trump	Parañaque	Maritime security, critical minerals, economic cooperation, artificial intelligence and cybersecurity	
8th	TBD	India	(India) Narendra Modi (Australia) Anthony Albanese (Japan) Sanae Takaichi (United States) Donald Trump	New Delhi	TBD	

== Creation and cessation of the Quad (2007–2008) ==
=== Creation ===
In early 2007, Prime Minister Abe proposed the Quad, under which India would join a formal multilateral dialogue with Japan, the United States and Australia.

The initiation of an American, Japanese, Australian and Indian defence arrangement, modelled on the concept of a Democratic Peace, was credited to Japanese Prime Minister Shinzo Abe. The Quad was supposed to establish an "Asian Arc of Democracy", envisioned to ultimately include countries in Central Asia, Mongolia, the Korean Peninsula, and other countries in Southeast Asia: "virtually all the countries on China's periphery, except for China itself." This led some critics, such as former U.S. State Department official Morton Abramowitz, to call the project "an anti-Chinese move", while others have called it a "democratic challenge" to the projected Chinese century, mounted by Asian powers in coordination with the United States. While China has traditionally favoured the Shanghai Cooperation Organisation, the Quad was viewed as an "Asian NATO;" Daniel Twining of the German Marshall Fund of the United States has written that the arrangement "could lead to military conflict," or could instead "lay an enduring foundation for peace" if China becomes a democratic leader in Asia.

=== China's opposition ===
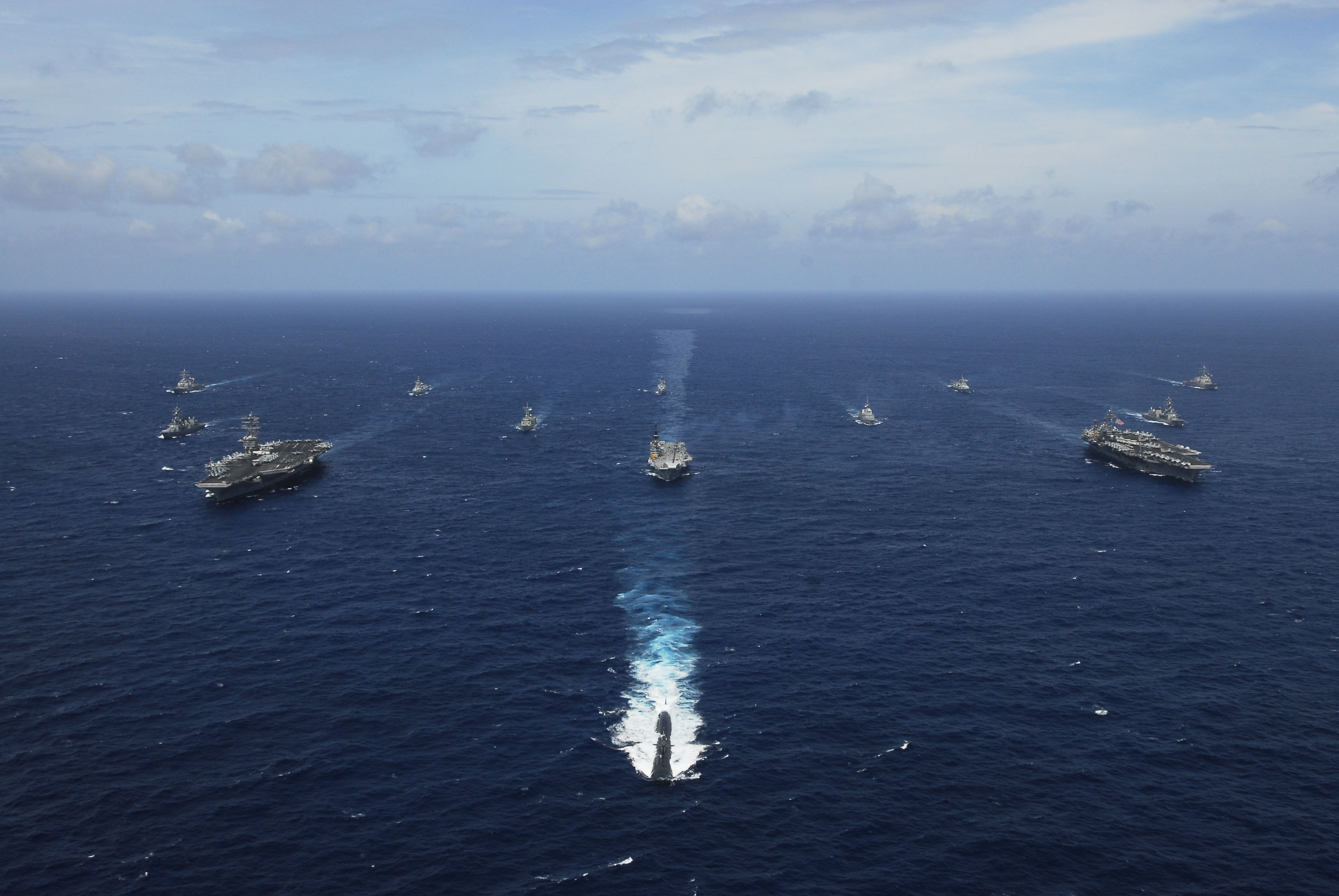
Naval vessels from Australia, India, Japan, Singapore, and the United States take part in Malabar Exercise in the Bay of Bengal in 2007.

China sent diplomatic protests to all four members of the Quad before any formal convention of its members. In May 2007 in Manila, Australian Prime Minister John Howard participated with other members in the inaugural meeting of the Quad at Cheney's urging, one month after joint naval exercises near Tokyo by India, Japan and the United States. In September 2007 further naval exercises were held in the Bay of Bengal, including Australia. These were followed in October by a further security agreement between Japan and India, ratified during a visit by Indian Prime Minister Manmohan Singh to Tokyo, to promote sea lane safety and defence collaboration; Japan had previously established such an agreement only with Australia.

Though the Quadrilateral initiative of the Bush administration improved relationships with New Delhi, it gave the impression of "encircling" China. The security agreement between Japan and India furthermore made China conspicuous as absent on the list of Japan's strategic partners in Asia. These moves appeared to "institutionally alienate" China, the Association of South-East Asian Nations (ASEAN), and promote a "Washington-centric" ring of alliances in Asia.

The Japanese Prime Minister succeeding Abe, Taro Aso, downplayed the importance of China in the Japan-India pact signed following the creation of the Quad, stating, "There was mention of China – and we do not have any assumption of a third country as a target such as China." Indian Foreign Secretary Shiv Shankar Menon similarly argued that the defence agreement was long overdue because of Indian freight trade with Japan, and did not specifically target China. On the cusp of visits to China and meetings with Prime Minister Wen Jiabao and President Hu Jintao in January 2008, the Indian prime minister, Manmohan Singh, declared that "India is not part of any so-called contain China effort," after being asked about the Quad.

=== Australia's departure during Rudd ===
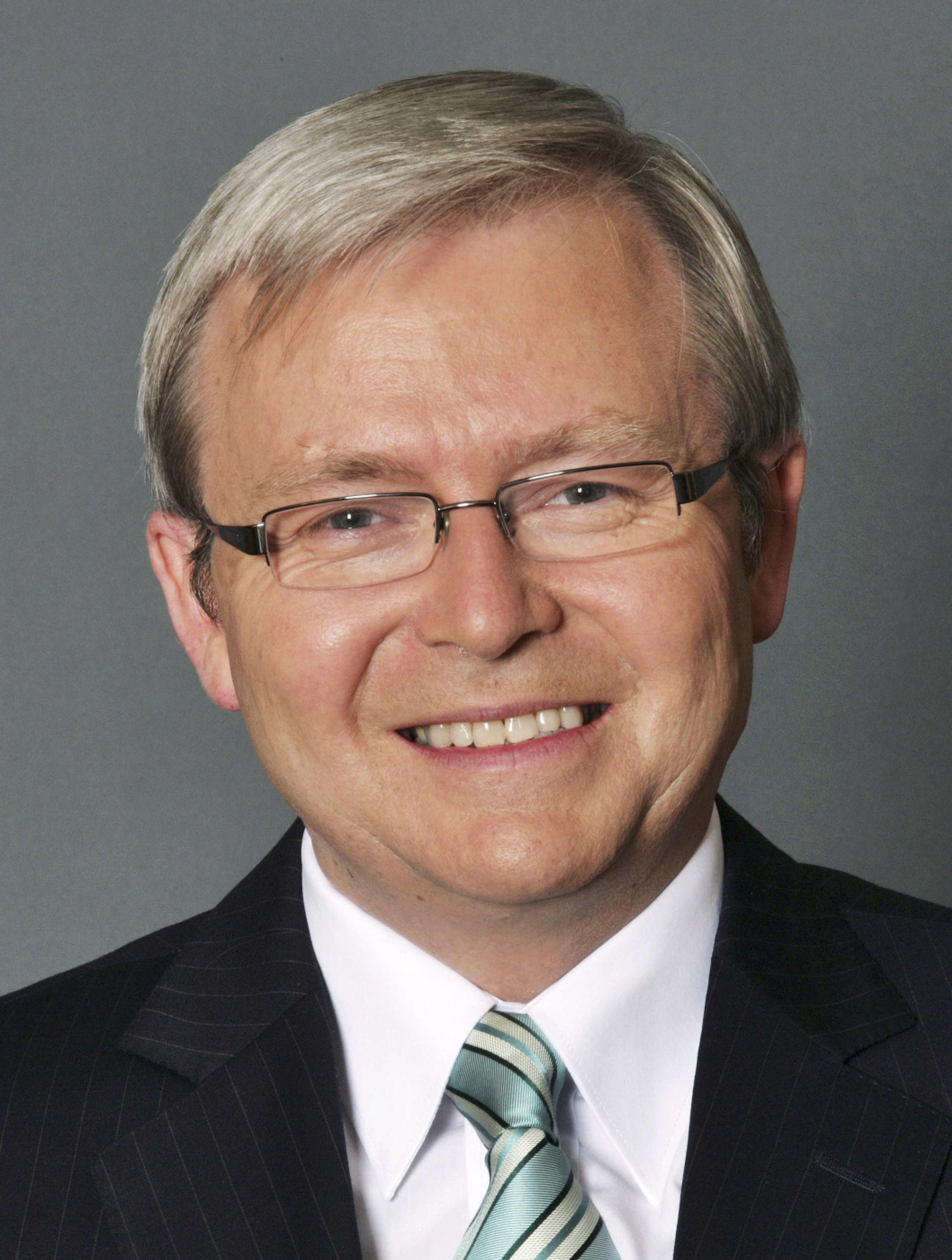
In 2008 Kevin Rudd terminated the Quad, signaling closer relations with China.

Fears over Chinese military spending and missile capacities had helped drive Australia towards a defence agreement with the United States, as outlined by the 2007 Canberra Defense Blueprint; Sandy Gordon of the Australian Strategic Policy Institute had recommended the sale of uranium to India on the basis of similar considerations, as it appeared that the United States was backing it as a "counter to a rising China." Chinese anger over the Quad however caused uneasiness within Australia even before the agreements were initiated.

On becoming prime minister, Kevin Rudd visited China's foreign minister, Yang Jiechi, even before visiting Japan, and subsequently organized a meeting between Yang and the Australian foreign minister, Stephen Smith, in which Australia unilaterally announced it would "not be proposing" a second round of dialogue between the four partners. Within Australia, this decision was seen as motivated by the uncertainty of China-United States relations and by the fact that Australia's principal economic partner, China, was not its principal strategic partner. Rudd may furthermore have feared regional escalations in conflict and attempted to diffuse these via an "Asia-Pacific Union."

Some US strategic thinkers criticized Rudd's decision to leave Quad; the former Asia director of the United States National Security Council, Mike Green, said that Rudd had withdrawn in an effort to please China, which had exerted substantial diplomatic effort to achieve that aim. A December 2008 leaked diplomatic cable authored by US ambassador Robert McCallum reveals that Rudd did not consult the United States before leaving the Quad.

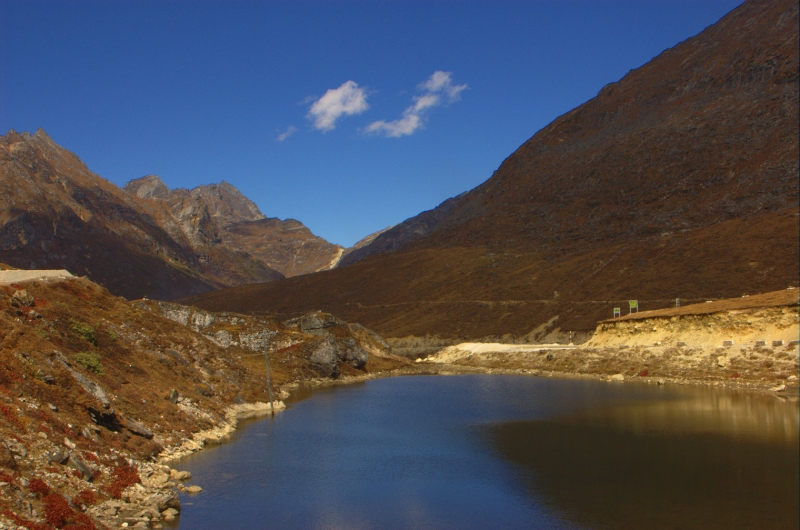
The Indian state of Arunachal Pradesh, a region claimed by China to be part of Tibet.

US President Obama's efforts in November 2009 to improve US–Indian relations raised alarms in India and Australia both that a deepening military alliance between these powers could lead to regional escalations. According to analyst John Lee, "For realists ... New Delhi has been warily balancing and competing against Beijing from the very moment of India's creation in 1947;" significant tensions between China and India were associated with the disputed Indian province of Arunachal Pradesh, and with Chinese nuclear weapons stationed on the Tibetan Plateau. Rudd's calculation may have been that as a regional economic power, China was too important to contain through a simplistic Quadrilateral Initiative undertaken by US, India, Japan and Australia in 2007, when many regional powers are hedging their alliances in the event of a Japanese and an American decline.

== Intermission (2009–2017) ==
=== Continued naval exercises ===
In the years between the cessation and restart of the Quad, Quad members continued to cooperate on a bilateral or trilateral level, sometimes with non-Quad members involved. This was especially the case in joint military exercises: Japan joined for the first time the Australian Kakadu and Nichi Trou Trident naval exercises in respectively 2008 and 2009, Japan and India held for the first time a joint naval exercise in 2012 and Australia and India did the same in 2015, Australia joined the US-Philippines Balikatan exercise for the first time in 2014 and Japan did the same in 2017, Japan joined for the first time the Indian Malabar exercise in 2015, and Japan joined for the first time the Australian-US joint Defence Exercise Talisman Saber in 2015.

=== Australia's foreign policy under the Liberal-National governments ===
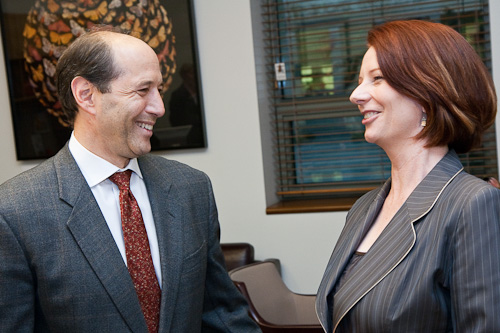
Australian Prime Minister Julia Gillard with US Ambassador Jeff Bleich in June 2010.

Rudd's replacement as Australian prime minister by Julia Gillard in June 2010 was associated with a shift in Australian foreign policy towards a closer relationship to the United States and a distancing from China. The Australian, which has written extensively on the Quad and on Australian defence issues, argued after Rudd's replacement that "Australia's national interest is best served by continuing to engage and encourage our long-standing ally, the US, to retain its primacy in the region." Despite Gillard's rapprochement with the US and increased US-Australian military cooperation, Rudd's decision to leave the Quad remained an object of criticism from Tony Abbott and the Liberal Party.

Australia's decision not to sell uranium to India had weakened the Quad, a move also criticized by the Liberal Party; the Party has however backed Gillard's support for a US military presence near Darwin, overlooking the Timor Sea and the Lombok Strait. With support from the United States, Gillard and the Labor party have since reversed policy and backed the sale of uranium to India, which has refused to sign the Nuclear Non-proliferation Treaty. On 5 September 2014, Australian Prime Minister Tony Abbott agreed to sell Uranium to India.

=== US' "Pivot to Asia" ===
The Obama administration's 2011 US "Pivot to Asia" represented a significant shift of resources and priorities in the foreign policy of the United States away from the Middle Eastern/European sphere and the US began to invest heavily in East Asian countries, some of which are in close proximity to the People's Republic of China. The pivot also included taking the lead in the Trans-Pacific Partnership trade agreement and rejecting the Chinese claims on the islands in the South China Sea. The US policy shift towards East-China was generally seen as a move to oppose the growing influence of China in the region. In July 2013, when Obama named Susan Rice the US National Security Advisor, Rice sought a cooperative relationship with China.

=== Japan's reorientation to the Indo-Pacific ===
Japan opened a naval base in Djibouti in 2011, its first long term naval base overseas, and part of its growing involvement in the wider Indo-Pacific region. In December 2012, Shinzo Abe had prepared a proposal on strategic framework "Asia's Democratic Security Diamond", a sort of Quad remake, to be published from an international media organization before his second administration in Japan, and it was published on the next day of his prime minister designate. The Japanese government had worked to clarify the concepts in Prime Minister Abe's proposal of 2012, implemented in diplomatic statements, and prepared the official announcement of "Free and Open Indo-Pacific" in 2016.

=== China's foreign policy under Xi ===
Territorial claims in the South China Sea

In 2012, Xi Jinping became the General Secretary of the Chinese Communist Party, succeeding the leader of China. Since then, tensions between China and each of the four Quad countries have increased. Xi has taken a hard-line on security issues as well as foreign affairs, projecting a more nationalistic and assertive China on the world stage than was the case with China's peaceful rise policy advanced by Xi's predecessor Hu Jintao. Xi's political program calls for a China more united and confident of its own value system and political structure.

Under Xi's leadership, the PRC has resorted to island building in the Spratly Islands and the Paracel Islands region. According to Reuters, island building in the South China Sea primarily by Vietnam and the Philippines has been going on for decades; while China has come late to the island building game, its efforts have been on an unprecedented scale as it had from 2014 to 2016 constructed more new island surface than all other nations have constructed throughout history and as of 2016 placed military equipment on one of its artificial islands unlike the other claimants. A 2019 article in Voice of America that compared China and Vietnam's island building campaign in the South China Sea similarly noted that the reason why Vietnam in contradistinction to China has been subject to little international criticism and even support was because of the slower speed and widely perceived defensive nature of its island-building project.

In a 2020 opinion column, former Indian general S. K. Chatterji described China's foreign policy as "salami slicing.". Between 2015 and mid-2017, the US has conducted five freedom of navigation naval operations (FONOP) in the region. In July 2016, an arbitration tribunal constituted under Annex VII of the United Nations Convention on the Law of the Sea (UNCLOS) ruled against the PRC's maritime claims in Philippines v. China. The tribunal did not rule on the ownership of the islands or delimit maritime boundaries. Both the People's Republic of China and the Republic of China (Taiwan) stated that they did not recognize the tribunal and insisted that the matter should be resolved through bilateral negotiations with other claimants.

=== India's shift in position and "Act East" ===
In the years following the cessation of the Quad, India was not keen to reinstate the grouping, out of fear it would antagonize China. After several years of growing tensions with China on a range of topics, and particularly after the 2017 border standoff, India started to express renewed interest.

== Restarting the Quad (2017–present) ==
=== 2017 ASEAN Summit ===
In August 2017, Japan invited Australia, India and the US to hold a joint foreign ministers meeting during the ASEAN summit in November.

In November 2016, American president-elect Donald Trump and Prime Minister Abe met and agreed to pursue what Japan calls a "Free and Open Indo-Pacific" strategy, "originally advanced by Japan, although the regional concept of the Indo-Pacific was truly sparked by the former US Secretary of State, Hillary Clinton". The agreement was regarded as a response to China's Belt and Road Initiative, and Chinese minister Geng Shuang responded by stating that "such multilateral initiatives should promote cooperation among countries concerned and not be turned into exclusionary frameworks."

The visit coincided with a meeting by Japanese, Indian, Australian and American officials to continue military cooperation ahead of the ASEAN and East Asia Summits in November 2017. The meeting included discussion of China's increased prominence in the South China Sea, and may have signalled U.S. president Trump's interest in reviving a formal Quad.

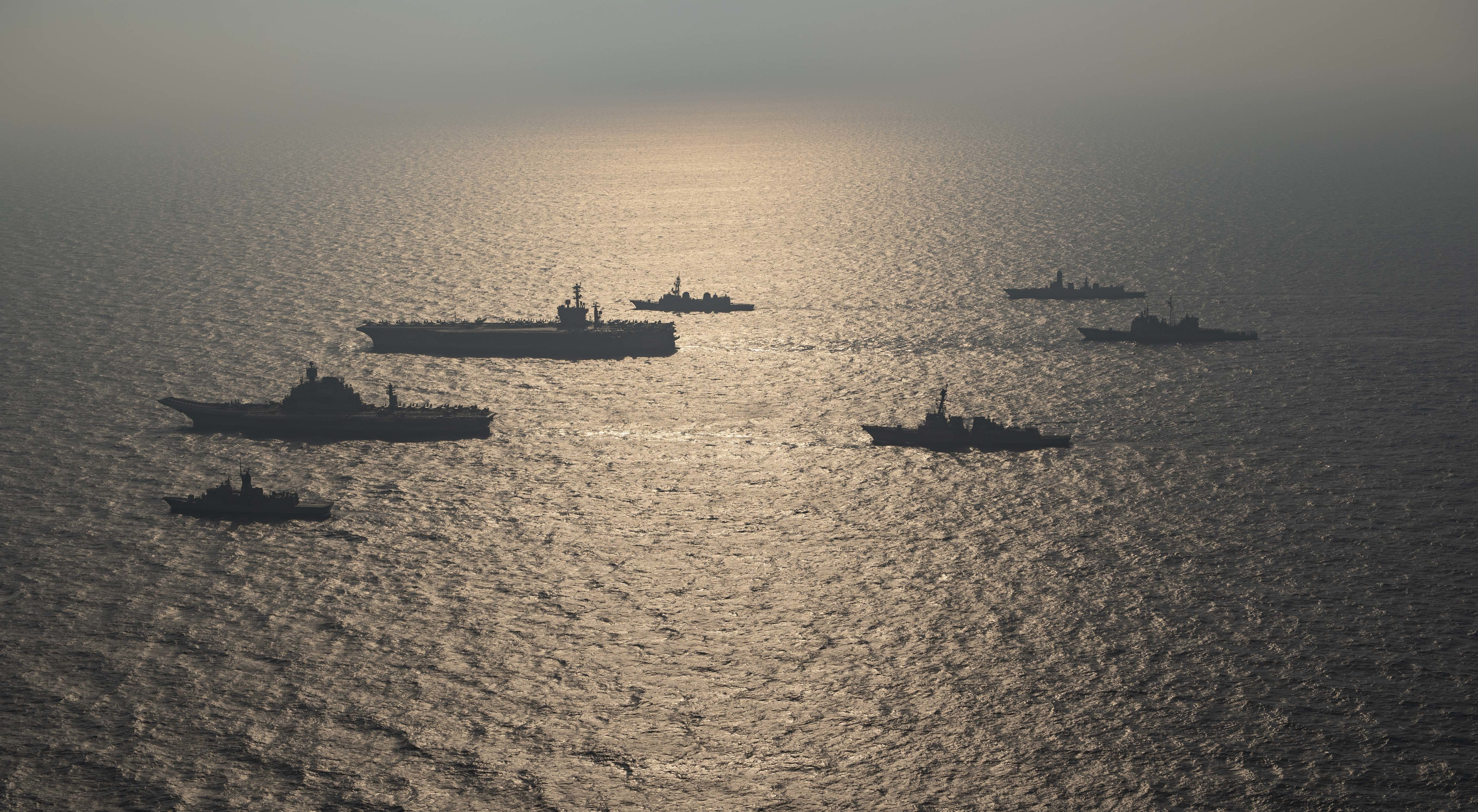
Naval vessels from the United States, Australia, Japan and India take part in the Malabar Exercise in 2020.

=== Follow-up meetings ===
The Quad met five times in 2017–2019. During the Raisina Dialogue in New Delhi in 2018, the navy chiefs of Japan, US, Australia and India came together, one of the first indications of the revival of the Quad's security structure.

In 2019, four ministers met in New York City to discuss reforming the Quad, and then again in Bangkok. The next summer, India, Japan and US invited Australia to the co-ordinated navy exercise at Malabar; the exercises were delayed due to the COVID-19 pandemic.

Indian Prime Minister Narendra Modi in his opening statement, on 24 May 2022, remarked the Quad has gained a significant place on the world stage and that it is a "force for good" for the Indo-Pacific region.

=== Quad Plus meetings ===
In March 2020, the Quad members held a meeting with representatives from New Zealand, South Korea and Vietnam to discuss their respective approaches to the ongoing COVID-19 pandemic. The participation of representatives from New Zealand, South Korea and Vietnam, the latter being the first country from Southeast Asia/ASEAN to join, was seen as another attempt to expand the importance of the QUAD as well as the growing threat China posed in the region. Instigated by the US, this new grouping of key Indo-Pacific states was referred to as "Quad Plus". A further meeting was held in May 2021 where Brazil and Israel, two countries with no border to the Pacific Ocean, were invited into the Plus format to discuss the distribution of COVID-19 vaccines.

=== Comparisons to NATO ===
Following the 2020 Malabar naval exercises, American secretary of state and former CIA director Mike Pompeo met with members of the Quad to discuss converting the security arrangement into an "Asian NATO" with "shared security and geopolitical goals". One commentator at the South China Morning Post described the concept as "a bulwark against the rise of China", and a Chinese diplomat protested the concept as an attempt to "wind back the clock of history." Indian Foreign Minister S. Jaishankar denies China's allegations and claimed India never had 'NATO mentality'.

The foreign secretary of Sri Lanka raised concerns in October 2020 about the militarization of the Quad in the Indian Ocean. At the same time, Japan, the US and Canada held a joint naval exercise called Keen Sword in October, which was one of several Canadian naval exercises in the Taiwan straits that year, and which was accompanied by diplomatic meetings in Tokyo, though no joint statement was produced from the meeting. With a visit by Australian Prime Minister Scott Morrison to Tokyo, Australia and Japan agreed in principle to a defence pact that will increase military ties.

In 2021, Li Jimming, the Chinese ambassador to Bangladesh, warned Bangladesh not to join the Quad saying any attempt to do so would seriously damage relations with China. The ambassador described the Quad as "a military alliance aimed against China's resurgence." Within Bangladesh these comments attracted criticism both from the government and otherwise for infringing on Bangladesh's sovereignty. Following the controversy Li Jimming walked back his statement saying that he was only expressing his personal view on the issue. However the Chinese Foreign Ministry appeared to defend the ambassador with Hua Chunying stating that "We all know what kind of mechanism the Quad is. China opposes certain countries' efforts to form an exclusive clique, portray China as a challenge, and sow discord between regional countries and China."

=== Expanding scope ===
On 3 March 2021, The White House, now under president Biden, issued the "Interim National Security Strategic Guidance", and two days later, Australian Prime Minister Morrison announced that the leaders of the Quad would hold their first-ever meeting virtually. Morrison said he had discussed arrangements with US President Joe Biden and Vice President Kamala Harris in recent weeks. The next week, on 12 March, the first summit meeting was held virtually by US President Biden. In a joint statement, the Quad members described "a shared vision for a Free and Open Indo-Pacific" and a "rules-based maritime order in the East and South China seas," which they state are needed to counter Chinese maritime claims. Further development of the Quad included the launches of the senior-level Quad Vaccine Experts Group, the Quad Climate Working Group, and the Quad Critical and Emerging Technology Working Group. It had been reported before the summit meeting that the four countries are working to develop a plan to distribute COVID-19 vaccines to countries in Asia as part of a broader strategy to counter China's influence, and that India had urged the other three countries to invest in its vaccine production capacity. The next summit meeting was to be held in person by the end of 2021. In March 2021, the Quad pledged to respond to the economic and health impacts of COVID-19.

=== Other meetings ===
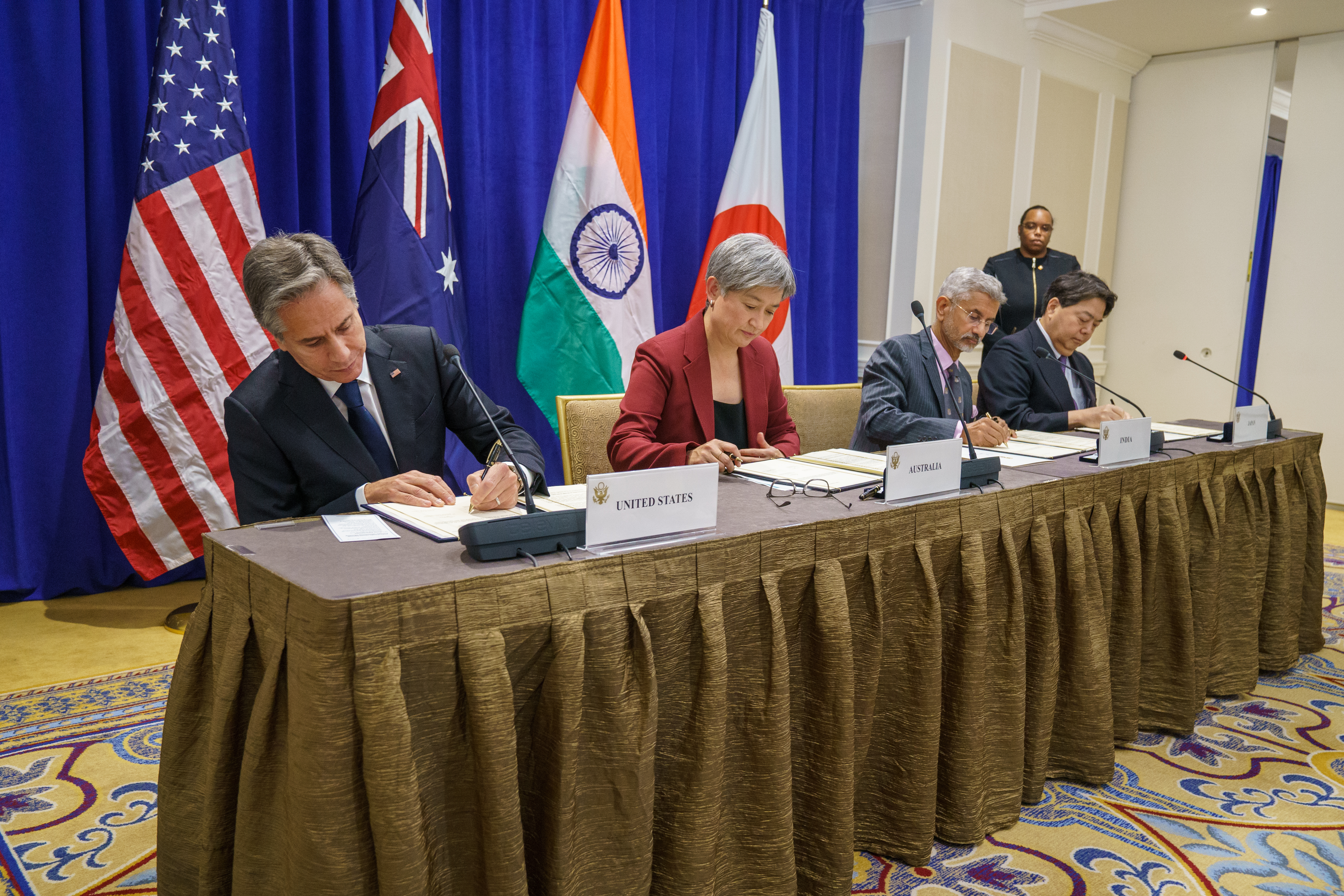
Quad foreign ministers meet in New York at the margins of the 2022 UN General Assembly

On 15 March 2021, US Secretary of State Antony Blinken and Defense Secretary Lloyd Austin arrived at the Yokota Air Base in Tokyo. They had contributed to a Washington Post article before their flight. On 16 March, the two US officials participated in a Security Consultative Committee (SCC), the so-called "two-plus-two", with Japanese Foreign Minister Toshimitsu Motegi and Defense Minister Nobuo Kishi. Also, the two US officials have met and talked with Prime Minister Suga.

On 19 March, US Defense Secretary Austin arrived at India, and met with Prime Minister Narendra Modi and Indian National Security Adviser Ajit Doval. The next day, he discussed with Indian Defence Minister Rajnath Singh.

On 13 April, the foreign and defence ministers of Japan and Germany held the first "two-plus-two" dialogue between the two nations, with each expected to affirm security cooperation in an apparent counter to China's increasing assertiveness in its regional waters. On 16 April, in Washington, D.C., US President Biden and Japanese Prime Minister Suga met and showcased the alliance between their two countries as well as their shared resolve in dealing with China. The US and Japanese governments have been working to strengthen technology supply chains independent of China during a shortage of semiconductors that's worrying businesses around the world. Both countries are expected in coming days to make deeper commitments to cutting climate-wrecking fossil fuel emissions, in line with Biden's climate summit with 40 world leaders next week.

Suga planned to visit India and the Philippines. With India and the US, he also sought to further solidify the Quad framework. Japan and India would hold a "two-plus-two" foreign and defence ministerial meeting in Tokyo in late April, government sources said.

Senior military commanders from Quad member countries, including India's chief of defence staff General Anil Chauhan, were meeting in Rancho Mirage, California on 15–17 May 2023, discussing the Indo-Pacific security.

=== Regular summit meetings ===
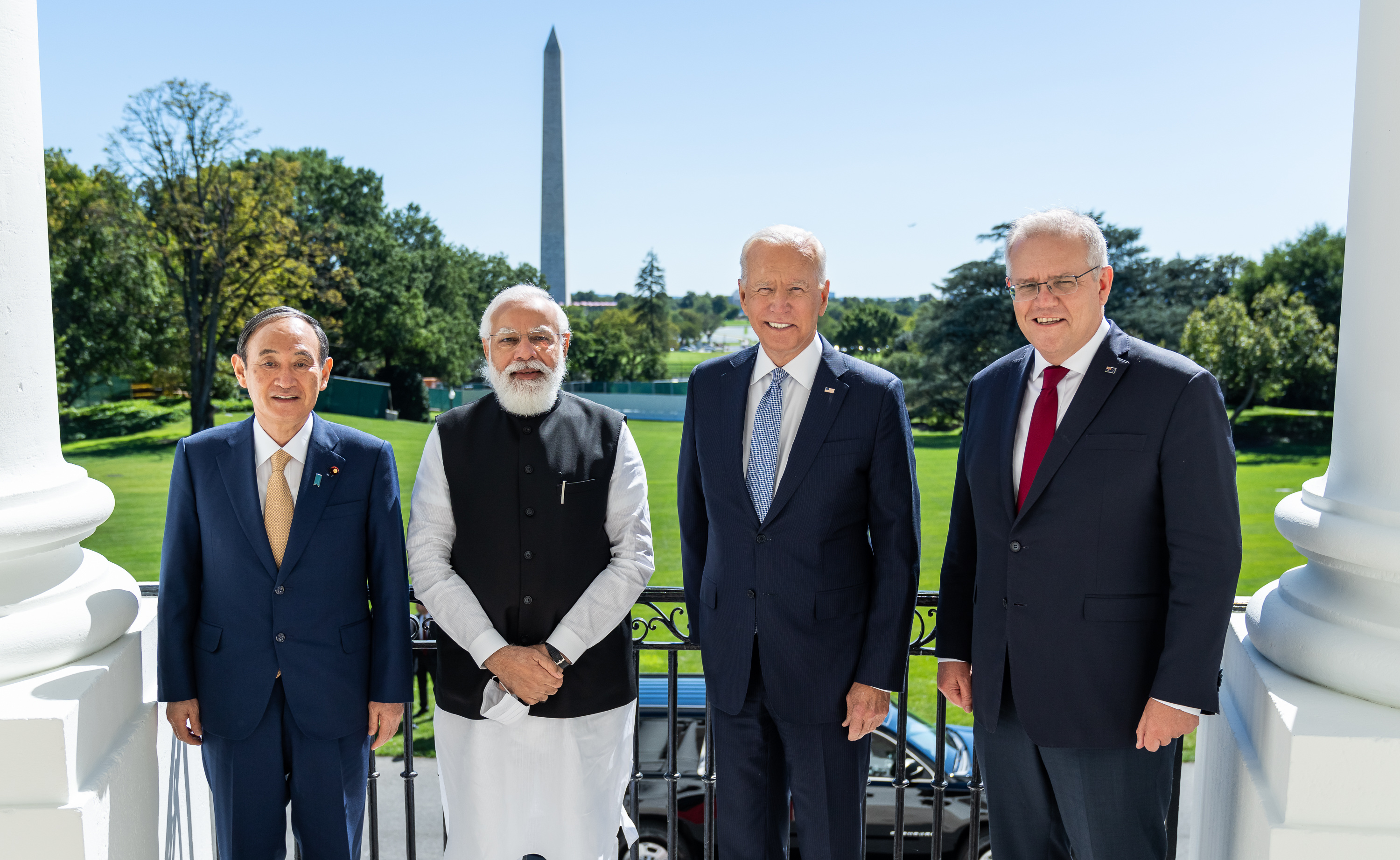
From left to right: Japanese Prime Minister Yoshihide Suga, Indian Prime Minister Narendra Modi, U.S. President Joe Biden and Australian Prime Minister Scott Morrison held the first in-person Quad meeting in Washington, D.C., 2021

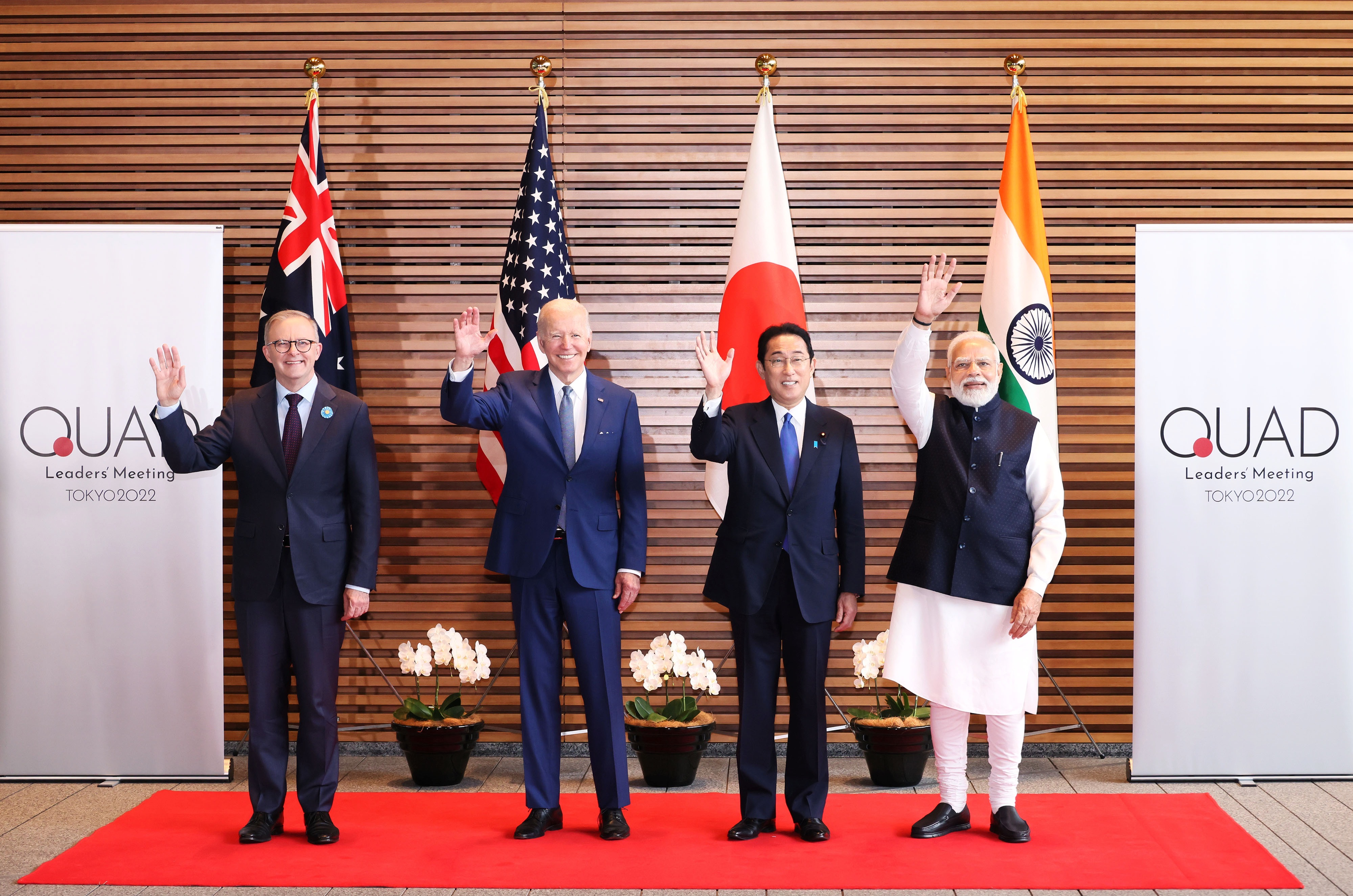
From left to right: Australian Prime Minister Anthony Albanese, U.S. President Joe Biden, Japanese Prime Minister Fumio Kishida and Indian Prime Minister Narendra Modi in Tokyo, Japan on 24 May 2022.

Since March 2021, member states of the Quad and their leaders have hosted regular "Leaders Summits", which have been both online and in-person. The summits have aimed to solidify the positions of the Quad and demonstrate the alliances commitment to cooperation.

The first "Quad Leaders Summit" was held virtually on 24 March 2021, hosted by U.S. President Joe Biden. Attending leaders included Australian Prime Minister Scott Morrison, Japanese Prime Minister Yoshihide Suga and Indian Prime Minister Narendra Modi. (Note: This article incorporates text from this source, which is in the public domain.)

On 24 September 2021, U.S. President Joe Biden hosted the second Quad Leaders Summit, and the first in-person meeting of the group, at the White House in Washington, with Indian Prime Minister Narendra Modi, Australian Prime Minister Scott Morrison and Japanese Prime Minister Yoshihide Suga all participating.

On 4 March 2022, the third Quad Leaders Summit was held via video conference, with leaders and representatives of Australia, India, Japan and the United States participating. During the meeting leaders "reaffirm[ed] their commitment to the Indo-Pacific" and "discussed the ongoing conflict and humanitarian crisis in Ukraine."

On 24 May 2022, Japanese Prime Minister Fumio Kishida hosted the fourth Quad Leaders Summit and the second in-person meeting in Tokyo, Japan. U.S. President Joe Biden, Indian Prime Minister Narendra Modi and newly elected Australian Prime Minister Anthony Albanese, all attended the meeting. The summit concluded with a joint statement from the leaders that vowed their "steadfast commitment to a free and open Indo-Pacific that is inclusive and resilient."

On 24 May 2023, Australian Prime Minister Anthony Albanese was set to host the fifth Quad Leaders Summit in Sydney, with proceedings being held at the Sydney Opera House. On 17 May, a week before the scheduled summit, plans were cancelled following an announcement by President Biden that he would not be attending due to domestic negotiations over the debt-limit. The leaders instead met during the 49th G7 summit held in Japan on 20 May. Although Prime Minister Modi still visited Sydney for a bilateral meeting with Albanese after the summit.

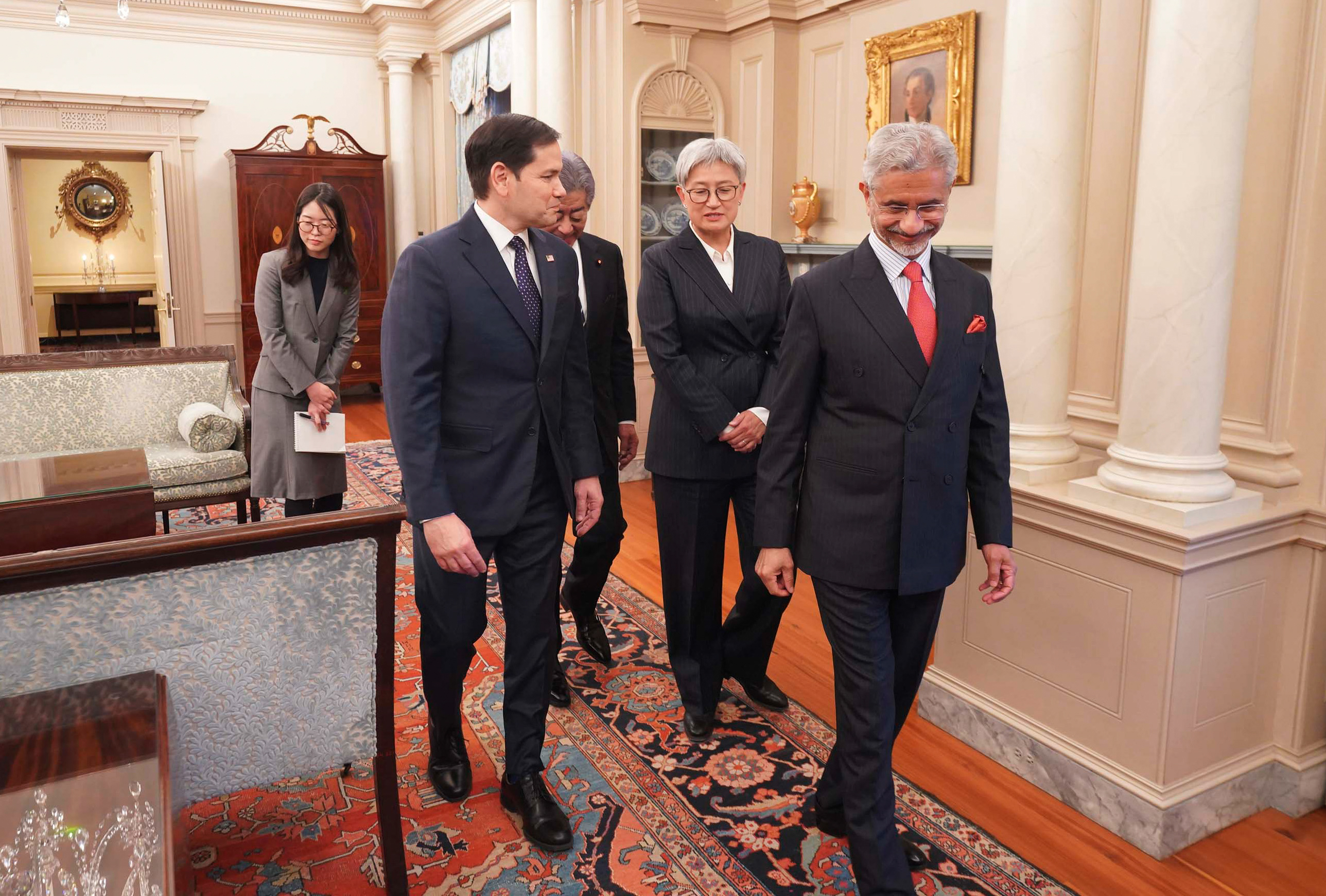
Quad Foreign Ministers (Rubio, Jaishankar, Wong and Takeshi) meet right after Second inauguration of Donald Trump on 21st January 2025 in Washington, DC

The 2024 meeting was originally set to be hosted by Indian Prime Minister Narendra Modi and was scheduled to be held in January immediately following Republic Day in India. The meeting was then postponed to September in that year and was hosted by US president Joe Biden in Delaware, United States. During a visit by Eric Garcetti, the idea of a QUAD satellite, to be built in co-operation between the US and India was mooted. The summit held on 21 September 2024 committed the nations to the Quad Cancer Moonshot Initiative, and to the elimination of cervical cancer.

The joint statement of the Quad foreign ministers' meeting on 21 January 2025 affirmed strengthening a free and open Indo-Pacific, and its opposition to "any unilateral actions that seek to change the status quo by force or coercion". The statement did not mention the Quad's commitment to denuclearization of the Korean Peninsula, signalling the US government's shift to recognize North Korea as a nuclear state.

=== 2026 New Delhi Foreign Ministers' Meeting ===
On 26 May 2026, the Quad Foreign Ministers met in New Delhi. They announced the Quad Critical Minerals Framework to strengthen supply chains, launched the Indo-Pacific Maritime Surveillance Collaboration (IPMSC) to enhance maritime domain awareness, and advanced the Ports of the Future Partnership by committing to work with Fiji on port infrastructure.

The ministers opposed any measures inconsistent with UNCLOS, including the imposition of tolls in the Strait of Hormuz and the Red Sea.

== Concept of the Indo-Pacific ==
The four Quad members have played a major role in purposefully redefining the "Asia-Pacific" as the "Indo-Pacific", to deepen trans-regional ties between the Indian and Pacific Ocean areas, and to, in their words, deal more effectively with the rise of China in Asia, the Middle East and Africa. The term "Indo-Pacific" gained traction in the political lexicon and strategic thinking of not only the Quad members, but as of recently also of ASEAN, the European Union, the United Kingdom, France, Germany, and the Netherlands, used mainly with regards to China.

=== European and Canadian pivot to the Indo-Pacific ===
At the Shangri-La Dialogue in Singapore in June 2018, French and British defence ministers announced they would sail warships through the South China Sea to challenge China's military expansion. In a similar move, on 16 September 2020, France, the UK and Germany together submitted a note verbale to the United Nations, which reaffirmed that the integrity of UNCLOS needs to be maintained, stating that China's territorial claims in the South China Sea do not comply with it.

On 20 January 2021, Joe Biden became the president of the United States, and two days later, US and Japanese top security officials discussed security issues. Three days after that, the Japanese Foreign Minister, Toshimitsu Motegi, attended the EU Foreign Affairs Council to promote cooperation between Japan and the EU in the Indo-Pacific. On 18 February, during the third ministerial meeting, the United States, Australia, Japan and India agreed to strongly oppose any use of force by China, and vowed to work with ASEAN and Europe to meet their aims.

==== Canada ====
While Canada has not published an Indo-Pacific strategy, it started increasing its naval presence in the region in 2020. In June 2020, Canadian frigate HMCS Regina and auxiliary vessel MV Asterix sailed through the Taiwan Strait. In January 2021, HMCS Winnipeg did the same and later joined the navies of the Quad members in the naval exercise Sea Dragon, according to a Canadian official "to demonstrate the strength and durability of our alliances in the Indo-Pacific region". In late March, the Canadian frigate HMCS Calgary passed near the Spratly Islands, which China claims.

==== European Union ====
The first Quad summit, held in March 2021, explored a partnership with Europe. France, Germany, and the Netherlands have announced their Indo-Pacific visions, and the EU is in the midst of formulating its own.

==== France ====
According to Brendan Berne, then the Australian ambassador to France, French president Macron said, when they met in late 2017 that "he was aware of the threat situation in the Indo-Pacific and that Australia would not be alone". Six months later, in June 2018, the same month as the 2018 Shangri-La Dialogue, France, with 1.6 million of its citizens living and over 90% of its exclusive economic zone located in the Indo-Pacific region, was the first EU member to publish an Indo-Pacific strategy, following increased Chinese assertiveness in the region, and updated it in May 2019. It was also the first EU member to use the geopolitical concept of the Indo-Pacific. Partnerships with all four members of the Quad as well as with ASEAN are a key component of France's Indo-Pacific strategy. As part of this strategic shift, French frigate Vendémiaire sailed through the Taiwan Strait in 2018, possibly the first-ever such passage for the modern French Navy, and was seen as a freedom of navigation patrol, countering China's claim over the Strait.

On 9 September 2020, France, India and Australia held their first India-France-Australia Trilateral Dialogue, with their foreign secretaries meeting through videoconference. In December 2020, France also revealed it would join for the first time the joint military drills with Japan and the US in May 2021. On 10 February 2021, the French submarine Emeraude patrolled through the South China Sea, proving its capacity to deploy over long distances and work together with the navies of Australia, the US, and Japan. On 24 February 2021, a second India-France-Australia Trilateral Dialogue meeting was held, to evaluate progress on the actions defined in the first trilateral meeting in September. On 30 March 2021, French Navy's amphibious assault helicopter carrier Tonnerre and escort frigate Surcouf arrived at the Kochi port in Kerala, India, ahead of a joint naval exercise with the four Quad member countries. The French naval drill exercise called La Perouse was scheduled to take place from 5 to 7 April 2021. South China Morning Post reported this as the first instance of naval exercises to involve all four Quad members. In late April, India and France held their separate annual Varuna naval exercise. The two French warships were on a five-month-long deployment in the Indo-Pacific. On 13 April 2021, a third India-France-Australia Trilateral Dialogue meeting took place in New Delhi.

==== Germany ====
On 1 September 2020, the German government followed, releasing a policy document in which the country for the first time officially endorsed the concept of the Indo-Pacific, and among others includes actively building partnerships in the region, including on security matters, calling on the EU to do the same. In December 2020, in an online meeting between Japan's and Germany's defence ministers, Japan expressed hopes for Germany to send a warship to the Indo-Pacific region, and join drills with Japan Self-Defense Forces, In March 2021, Germany confirmed that it would send a frigate in August to the South China Sea, making it the first German warship since 2002 to traverse the region. In mid-April 2021, the foreign and defence ministers of Japan and Germany would meet via videoconference to discuss Indo-Pacific security topics.

==== Italy ====
Mirroring the India-France-Australia Trilateral, an India-Italy-Japan Trilateral was formed in June 2021, aiming to create a rules-based international order in the Indo-Pacific region.

==== Netherlands ====
In November 2020, the Netherlands published its Indo-Pacific strategy, making it the third EU member to do so, following France and Germany. The policy document calls on the EU to build partnerships in the region and to reject Chinese territorial claims more strongly. As part of this policy shift, the Netherlands would send the frigate HNLMS Evertsen to the Indo-Pacific as part of the British aircraft carrier group in 2021. In April 2021, Dutch prime minister Rutte and Indian prime minister Modi held a videoconference meeting to discuss cooperation in the Indo-Pacific region.

==== United Kingdom ====
In 2016 the UK moved a satellite in its Skynet military communications system eastward to extend coverage to east Asia and the western Pacific Ocean, and opened a new Australian ground station. At the opening ceremony the British High Commissioner referred to the territorial disputes in the South China Sea.

In December 2020, the UK announced it would dispatch an aircraft carrier strike group to waters near Japan as soon as early 2021, to conduct joint exercises with US military and Japan Self-Defense Forces in May. The strike group would consist of: the carrier HMS Queen Elizabeth (R08) with an embarked air group (consisting of 24 F-35 aircraft from No. 617 Squadron RAF and Marine Fighter Attack Squadron 211, along with 9 Merlin helicopters and a number of Wildcat helicopters); two Type 45 destroyers; two Type 23 frigates; two Royal Fleet Auxiliary logistics vessels; an Astute-class submarine; the American destroyer USS The Sullivans, and the Dutch frigate HNLMS Evertsen. Once it set sail, the strike group would also be joined by "at least a frigate" of the Royal Australian Navy, HMNZS Te Kaha and HMNZS Aotearoa from the Royal New Zealand Navy, and a number of vessels from the Japan Maritime Self-Defense Force, before it was reported that it would enter the South China Sea.

In March 2021, the UK published a policy document titled the "Integrated Review" which confirmed the UK's foreign policy shift towards the Indo-Pacific and included a nine-step plan detailing what this shift entails. The document acknowledged that trade between the UK and China was mutually beneficial, yet it also named China as "the biggest state-based threat to the U.K.'s economic security" and called on middle powers to work together in this new geopolitical context. Britain's "Indo-Pacific tilt" is exemplified in projects such as AUKUS, CPTPP, and GCAP.

== Analysis ==
According to the American think tank Center for a New American Security (CNAS), the United States pursued the Quad in an effort to adapt to an increasingly economically powerful China in the Asia-Pacific, where great power rivalry, massive military investment, social inequality, and contemporary territorial disputes have all made war in Asia "plausible." According to the CNAS, establishing a series of alliances among nations recognized as democratic by the United States furthers its own interests: "It is precisely because of the rise of Chinese power and the longer term trend towards multipolarity in the international system that values can and should serve as a tool of American statecraft today."

Prominent U.S. politicians from both Democratic and Republican parties have advocated a more aggressive diplomacy in Asia. During the 2008 US presidential campaign, President Obama called for a new worldwide concert of democracies to counter the influence of Russia and China in the UN Security Council; key officials of Obama's administration were involved in the Princeton Project, whose final report called for the construction of a new "concert of democracies". Secretary of State Hillary Clinton's Policy Planning Director at the State Department, Anne-Marie Slaughter, authored the Princeton Project's final report, which "called for reconstituting the quadrilateral military partnership among the United States, Japan, Australia and India". John McCain also called for a "league of democracies", and Rudy Giuliani for incorporating Asia's militarily capable democracies into NATO. The development of the Quad took place in the context of Chinese military modernization, geared towards contingency in Taiwan Strait but also towards "force projection capabilities". Some US officials view Chinese assertiveness in South China Sea as demonstrated by the naval confrontation between the USNS Impeccable and Chinese naval vessels near Hainan Island.

According to academic Jeremy Garlick, publishing in early 2024, the Quad had not yet achieved much in practice. Academic Jeffrey Crean concludes that as of 2024, the Quad had yet to find common ground or a coherent strategic approach. Crean writes that while Quad members have various conflicts with China, those conflicts arise in significantly different areas or with regard to different issues and this has been an obstacle to unified action.

The Australian government states that the aim of the partnership is to support 'a peaceful, stable and prosperous Indo-Pacific that is inclusive and resilient'.

== See also ==
- Andaman and Nicobar Command
- Anti-Chinese sentiment
- Chinese espionage in the United States
- Chinese salami slicing strategy
- East Asia island arcs (China containment policy)
- Indo-Pacific Maritime Surveillance Collaboration
- I2U2 Group (West Quad)
- Pax Americana
- Post–Cold War era
- Sea lines of communication
- Second Cold War
- String of Pearls
- Territorial disputes in the South China Sea
- United States-China Economic and Security Review Commission
- Vaccine diplomacy
- Wolf warrior diplomacy

International groupings

- ABCD Encirclement
- ANZUS
- AUKUS
- Blue Dot Network
- D-10 Strategy Forum
- Eight-Nation Alliance
- Five Eyes
- Five Power Defence Arrangements
- Group of Seven (G7)
- Partners in the Blue Pacific
- The Clean Network

International relations

- Australia–India relations
- Australia–Japan relations
- Australia–United States relations
- India–Japan relations
- India–United States relations
- Japan–United States relations
- Quad Critical Minerals Initiative Framework
- U.S.–China Strategic and Economic Dialogue

Military exercises

- Balikatan (Philippines–U.S.)
- Malabar (India–U.S.)
- Talisman Saber (Australia–U.S.)
- Varuna (France–India)
