= Unfinished Business: Women Men Work Family =

Unfinished Business
- First edition
- Author: Anne-Marie Slaughter
- Published: 2015, Random House
- ISBN: 9780812984972

Unfinished Business: Women Men Work Family is a 2015 non-fiction book written by Anne-Marie Slaughter, currently President and CEO of the New America Foundation. It is based on Slaughter's 2012 article Why Women Still Can't Have It All published in The Atlantic. Why Women Still Can't Have It All is one of the most widely read pieces in the Atlantic's history, with over 3 million views.

== Overview ==
A look into the challenges of career advancement for professional women with children and the "unfinished business" of the women's movement. Drawing on her own experiences as a mother and State Department official, Slaughter argues for the importance of valuing care: the work to nurture our friends, family and loved ones. Unfinished Business challenges key arguments in Lean In by Sheryl Sandberg, Chief Operating Officer of Facebook.

The book argues that a number of challenges remain for the women's movement in the US. It allows her to expands on her position in the article and respond to her critics. In Unfinished Business, she attempts to create a framework to understand the problems faced by all working parents, not just women. She also discusses US public policy and declares that without paid maternity leave, affordable childcare, the right to part-time work, job security for pregnant employees and better enforcement of discriminatory laws both men and women will continue to suffer. Slaughter urges a focus on the value of work being done, not on the traditional gender roles. She states that western notions of masculinity should be challenged before women imprison men to the crippling gender roles women have been fighting to escape from. Slaughter believes that men and women must acknowledge the damaging social system in place hindering their ability to make money while simultaneously caring for their families. When this system is realized they must work together to push the boundaries of traditional gender roles and create an impactful, positive change. Ultimately, Slaughter calls for a change in the workplace policies which affect both men and women. She argues that embracing a parental role, instead of a gendered one is crucial for the success of future families. One step toward gender equity that it advocates is empowering men to re-envision their lives and embrace the roles of engaged fathers, sons and caregivers.

== Critical reception ==
Unfinished Business has been widely reviewed in the US and UK. Jill Abramson, former executive editor of the New York Times, reviewed the book for the Washington Post, writing, "Slaughter's case for revaluing and better compensating caregiving is compelling. . . . Slaughter makes it a point in her book to speak beyond the elite...she’s right that there is something fundamentally wrong with a society that values managing money so much more than raising children well." The Economist wrote "Ms Slaughter has widened her conceptual lens in response to her critics. Whereas the Atlantic article was written "for my demographic [of] highly educated, well-off women who are privileged enough to have choices in the first place", Unfinished Business is full of voices from outside her social group."

The journal Signs devoted an online feature and the Winter 2017 issue to discussing the book, including nine responses from scholars and thinkers including Joan C Williams and Ai-Jen Poo. "Slaughter’s book is a pleasure to read, as is having her very considerable powers focused on work-family conflict. I fervently hope her focus on building a broad coalition and using a broad range of change levers will help her generation accomplish more than mine did. God knows we need it," Joan Williams wrote in her response. Premilla Nadasen wrote: "Slaughter’s most important contribution is to reclaim care work as valuable. She argues that care is a universal issue that connects people across class and race lines, and that it includes not just child care but care for disabled adults and the elderly. Revaluing care, Slaughter argues, means changing the way we think, transforming our workplaces, and offering both better pay to care workers and government support for family-friendly policies."
