= Joan C. Williams =

American feminist legal scholar (born 1952)

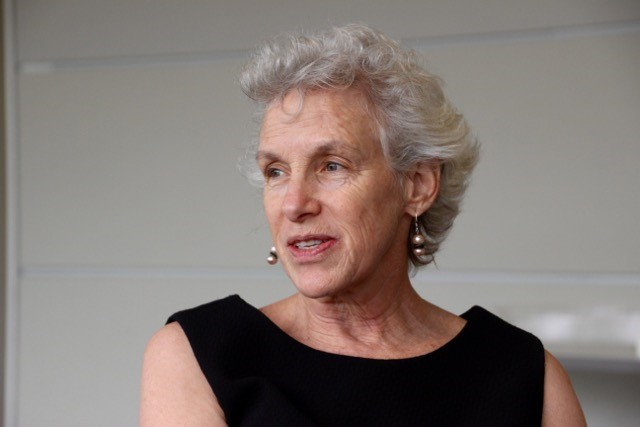
- Born: Joan Chalmers Williams; 1952 (age 73–74)
- Occupation: Law Professor

Academic background
- Education: Yale University (BA); Massachusetts Institute of Technology (MA); Harvard University (JD)
- Website: www.equalityactioncenter.org

Joan Chalmers Williams is an American law professor who is Distinguished Professor of Law (Emerita) at University of California College of the Law, San Francisco. She has published 12 books and 116 academic articles in law, sociology, psychology, and management journals.

== Education and early career ==
Williams received a B.A. in history from Yale University, a master's degree in City Planning from the Massachusetts Institute of Technology, and a J.D. from Harvard Law School. Between college and law school she did city planning work at Skidmore, Owings & Merrill. She was employed for many years as a professor of property law at American University, Washington College of Law. She later became a law professor at University of California Law SF (2005-present). Her 1989 law review article, “Deconstructing Gender,” was cited as one of the most cited law review articles ever written in 1996. In 1998, she co-founded (with Adrienne Davis) what became the Center for WorkLife Law; she passed the baton to Liz Morris and Jessica Lee in 2024. She founded the Equality Action Center in 2024.

== Social class dynamics in American politics ==
Williams’ work on social class extends the French sociologist Pierre Bourdieu’s insight that class is expressed through cultural differences between elites and non-elites. For the past quarter century, Williams has documented how college-educated elites differ from middle-status (a.k.a. blue-collar) Americans. In White Working Class, she argues that the logic of blue-collar life stems from its focus on self-discipline, “the kind that gets you up every day, on time, without “an attitude” to an often not-very-fulfilling job.” Blue-collar Americans also highly value traditional institutions that aid self-discipline: the military, religion and “traditional family values.” In contrast, the logic of elite life revolves around self-development because professional jobs require one to be “at the top of your game.” Elites also value novelty, which is a way they enact the sophistication that signals to others in the elite they are “in the know.”

What results is a “class culture gap” that conservatives have sculpted into the culture wars to forge an alliance between the working class and the Merchant Right against the Brahmin Left. Williams’ Outclassed: How the Left Lost the Working Class and How to Win Them Back (St. Martins, May 2025) details how to destabilize this alliance, which has twice elected Donald Trump president.

== Diversity, equity and inclusion ==
Williams is well-known both in the US and abroad for her work on diversity, equity and inclusion (DEI). Her TED talk, Why corporate diversity programs fail -- and how small tweaks can have big impact, has over 1.3 million views. In 2014, she launched “bias interrupters,” a data-driven approach to interrupting bias in organizations. Her team has published 37 articles in Harvard Business Review on bias interrupters and related topics. Her book Bias Interrupted: Creating Inclusion for Real and for Good, was called by Anne-Marie Slaughter “a deeply researched blend of evidence and practical, actionable advice.”

Williams is also often cited in the Korean press as an expert on the country’s low fertility rate as the result of a meme that has been shared throughout the country. She is the subject of a documentary on the country’s low birthrate by Korean public television, “A Conversation with Joan Williams.”

Williams and her EAC team have published nine studies documenting how racial and gender bias play out in today’s workplaces. These studies document how bias plays out in everyday workplace interactions, and that the experience of white men in professional workplaces differs from that of every other group, with women of color very consistently (though not invariably) reporting the most bias and the least fairness. The EAC’s work includes studies of the legal profession in the US and Chile, of engineers in the US and India, of US architects, of US tech workers, and US science professors.

== Work, family, and gender ==
Williams’s Unbending Gender: How Work and Family Conflict and What To Do About It (Oxford, 2000) won the Myers Outstanding Book Award, Gustavus Myers Center for the Study of Bigotry and Human Rights in North America, 2001.

Williams played a leading role in documenting maternal wall bias against mothers. She ran the working group whose work pioneered the study of workplace bias against mothers, and popularized the term “maternal wall bias” to refer to it. Her 2006 report “Out or Pushed Out: The Real Story of Women and Work,” set the frame later used to cover the COVID pandemic: that mothers weren’t choosing to drop out in pursuit of changed priorities—they were being pushed out by hostile workplace. She also coined the popularized the term the “flexibility stigma” to refer to the career detriments often associated with flexible work schedules.

When Williams founded WorkLife Law in 1998, mothers were being fired, told it was because they were mothers, and federal courts were saying that was not gender discrimination. Her 2003 law review article “Beyond the Maternal Wall” argued that this common practice constituted sex discrimination in violation of Title VII and other federal laws. Her legal theories were adopted by the Equal Employment Opportunity Commission’s in 2007 and 2012. “Beyond the Maternal Wall” was prominently cited in the landmark 2004 case that held that discrimination based on motherhood was sex discrimination, Back v. Hastings on Hudson. By 2010 “family responsibilities discrimination” (a term she coined) was one of the fastest growing arenas of anti-discrimination lawsuits.

Williams has also played a central role in documenting work-family conflict among hourly workers, through reports such as “One Sick Child Away From Being Fired” (2006) and “The Three Faces of Work-Family Conflict” (2010) (co-authored by Heather Boushey, then at the Center for American Progress). She was Co-Principal Investigator of the Gap Stable Scheduling Study (with Susan Lambert and Sarvanan Kesevan). This was a randomized controlled experiment that shifted a group of Gap workers to more stable schedules and found that not only did workers’ health outcomes improve—so did Gap’s sales and labor productivity).

Williams, with Jessica Lee of WorkLife Law, pioneered the use of Title IX to garner rights for pregnant and parenting students. Together they founded The Pregnant Scholar in 2007. In 2019, the legal rights they pioneered were included the National Academies of Sciences, Engineering, and Medicine’s report: Supporting Family Caregivers in STEM.

== Honors and grants ==
Williams was awarded an honorary degree from the University of Utrecht in The Netherlands in 2017. For her contributions to the legal profession, she has received both the American Bar Foundation’s Outstanding Scholar Award (2012) and the ABA’s Margaret Brent Women Award for Lawyers of Achievement (2006). For her contributions to the work-family field, she received the Work Life Legacy Award from the Families and Work Institute (2014) and MSOM Responsible Research Award in Operations Management (2022). For her contributions to women in engineering, she received the President's Award from the Society of Women Engineers (2019). For contributions to psychology, she received the Distinguished Publication Award from the Association for Women in Psychology (2005). Endowed lectures include the Roger S. Aaron '64, T '65 Distinguished Lecture on Ethics in Law and Business at Dartmouth, 2024 and Massey Lectures in American Civilization Massey Lectures in American Civilization, Harvard University, 2008.

== Selected works ==
- Williams, Joan C. (2025) Outclassed: How the Left Lost the Working Class and How to Win Them Back. St. Martin's Press. ISBN 1250368960.
- Williams, Joan C. (2017). White Working Class: Overcoming Class Cluelessness in America. Boston, MA: Harvard Business Review Press. ISBN 978-1633693784.
- Williams, Joan C.; Dempsey, Rachel (2014). What Works for Women at Work: Four Patterns Working Women Need to Know. New York, NY: NYU Press. ISBN 978-1479835454.
- Williams, Joan C. (2010). Reshaping the Work-Family Debate: Why Men and Class Matter. Cambridge, MA: Harvard University Press. ISBN 978-0674055674.
- Williams, Joan C. (1999). Unbending Gender: Why Family and Work Conflict and What To Do About It. Oxford: Oxford University Press. ISBN 978-0195094640.

== See also ==
- Feminist psychology
