= Center for WorkLife Law =

The Center for WorkLife Law ("WorkLife Law" or "WLL") is a national advocacy and research organization housed at the University of California College of the Law, San Francisco. WorkLife Law seeks to advance gender and racial equity at work and in higher education by strengthening legal rights for pregnant people and family caregivers. WLL staff advocate for changes in policies that discriminate against women and people of color and create research-based, actionable tools for workers and advocates to address discrimination in their workplaces and schools. WLL has many initiatives and programs to target different types of discrimination, including those focused on pregnancy, lactation, and caregiving discrimination.

WLL was founded in 1998 by Joan C. Williams. Currently, the co-directors are Jessica Lee and Liz Morris.
