= Indo-Pacific Maritime Surveillance Collaboration =

Quad Indo-Pacific Maritime Surveillance Collaboration (IPMSC)
- Type: Maritime security framework
- Signed: 26 May 2026
- Location: New Delhi, India
- Effective: 26 May 2026
- Signatories: Australia; India; Japan; United States
- Parties: Australia; India; Japan; United States
- Language: English

The Indo-Pacific Maritime Surveillance Collaboration (IPMSC) is a cooperative initiative among the four Quad countries – Australia, India, Japan, and the United States – to enhance maritime domain awareness and coordinate surveillance activities across the Indo-Pacific region. The framework was announced on 26 May 2026 at the Quad Foreign Ministers’ Meeting in New Delhi, India.

== Background ==
The Indo-Pacific region accounts for more than 60% of global maritime trade and is home to critical sea lanes of communication (SLOCs), including the South China Sea, the East China Sea, and the Indian Ocean.

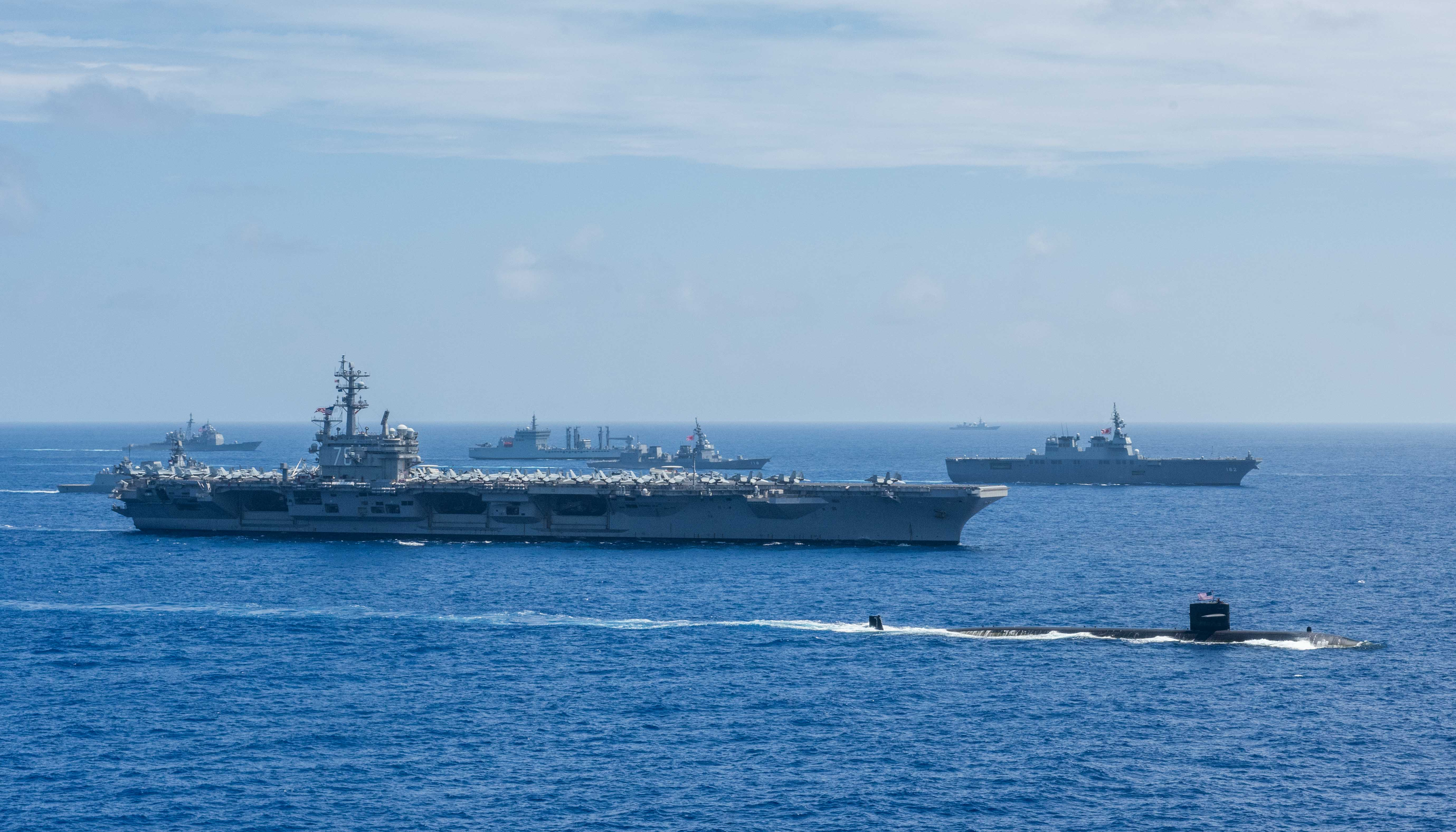
Ships from the Indian Navy, Japan Maritime Self-Defense Force, and U.S. Navy during Exercise Malabar 2018, a multilateral maritime exercise in the Indo-Pacific.

Concerns over unregulated fishing, maritime militarization, and unlawful activities at sea have prompted Quad countries to deepen cooperation on maritime domain awareness (MDA).

== Key provisions ==
=== Integration of surveillance capabilities ===
The IPMSC aims to integrate satellite, aerial, and surface maritime surveillance systems of the four Quad countries to create a near‑real‑time Common Operating Picture (COP) of maritime activity in the Indo-Pacific. The initiative initially concentrates on the Indian Ocean Region, with plans to expand to other areas.

=== Information sharing and analysis ===
Under the framework, participating nations will share data on vessel movements, illegal fishing, suspicious shipping behavior, and environmental threats. The collaboration includes the establishment of dedicated liaison officers and shared data platforms to enable rapid analysis and response.

=== Complement to IPMDA ===
The IPMSC is designed to work alongside the expanded IPMDA. According to the Australian government factsheet, the IPMSC leverages “the latest technological developments to augment the IPMDA” and helps Quad countries “to better coordinate our own assets”. The 2026 Quad leaders’ expansion of IPMDA aims to develop a comprehensive COP across the entire Indo-Pacific.

=== Not a militarization effort ===
Indian Ministry of External Affairs (MEA) officials clarified that the IPMSC is “not militarization” but rather a practical, technology‑driven initiative to enhance transparency and safety at sea.

== Reactions ==
Quad foreign ministers welcomed the IPMSC as a “practical, non‑traditional security cooperation” that strengthens the Quad’s contribution to regional stability. U.S. Secretary of State Marco Rubio stated that the collaboration would help “deter illicit maritime activities” and protect freedom of navigation. Australian Foreign Minister Penny Wong emphasized the initiative’s role in supporting the rule of law and the security of Pacific and Indian Ocean island states.

== See also ==
- Quadrilateral Security Dialogue
- Indo-Pacific
- Quad Critical Minerals Initiative Framework
- Freedom of navigation
- Maritime domain awareness
- Sea lines of communication
