= John Ikenberry =

American political scientist (born 1954)

Gilford John Ikenberry
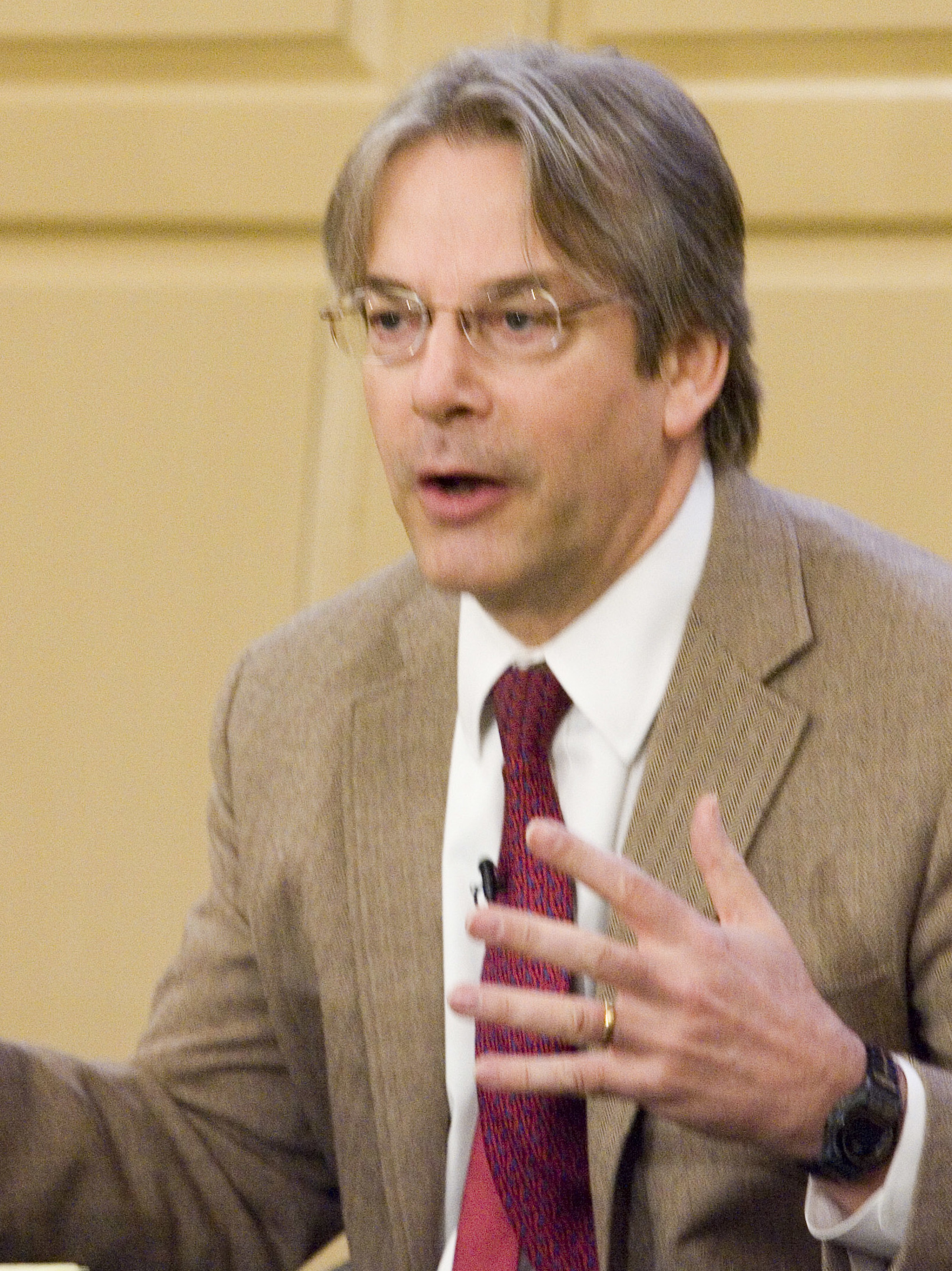
- Born: October 5, 1954 (age 71)
- Education: Manchester University (B.A.), University of Chicago (Ph.D.)
- Scientific career
- Fields: International relations
- Workplaces: Georgetown University, Princeton University, University of Pennsylvania

Gilford John Ikenberry (October 5, 1954) is an American political scientist. He is the Albert G. Milbank Professor of Politics and International Affairs at Princeton University.

Known for his work on international relations theories, such as books After Victory (2001) and Liberal Leviathan (2011), he has been described as "the world's leading scholar of the liberal international order."

== Career ==
After receiving his BA from Manchester University, Indiana, and his PhD from the University of Chicago in 1985, Ikenberry became an assistant professor at Princeton, where he remained until 1992. He then moved to the University of Pennsylvania, where he taught from 1993 to 1999, serving as co-director of the Lauder Institute from 1994 to 1998, while since 1996 he has been Visiting Professor at the Catholic University of Milan in Italy. In 2001, he joined Georgetown University as the Peter F. Krogh Professor of Geopolitics and Global Justice in the Edmund A. Walsh School of Foreign Service. He returned to Princeton in 2004, at the invitation of then-Dean Anne-Marie Slaughter, as the Albert G. Milbank Professor of Politics and International Affairs in the Woodrow Wilson School of Public and International Affairs. Ikenberry is also a Global Eminence Scholar at Kyung Hee University in Seoul, Korea. In 2013-2014 he was the 72nd Eastman Visiting Professor at Balliol College, University of Oxford.

Ikenberry served on the U.S. State Department's Policy Planning Staff from 1991 to 1992. He was a Senior Associate at the Carnegie Endowment for International Peace from 1992 to 1993, a Fellow at the Woodrow Wilson International Center for Scholars from 1998 to 1999, and a non-resident Senior Fellow at the Brookings Institution from 1997 to 2002. He has also worked for several projects of the Council on Foreign Relations and is the Political and Legal book reviewer for Foreign Affairs.

Ikenberrry was elected as a member of the American Academy of Arts and Sciences in 2016.

== Criticism of U.S. policy ==
Ikenberry is known for vehement criticism of what he described as the "neoimperial grand strategy" of the United States under the Bush administration. His critique is primarily a pragmatic one, arguing not that the U.S. should eschew imperialism as a matter of principle, but rather, that it is not in a position to succeed at an imperial project. He contends that such a strategy, rather than enabling a successful war on terrorism and preserving international peace, will end up alienating American allies, weakening international institutions, and provoking violent blowback, including terrorism, internationally, as well as being politically unsustainable domestically.

In a Foreign Affairs article titled "The Rise of China and the Future of the West", Ikenberry suggests strengthening and re-investing in the existing institutions and rules of U.S.-led western order. He argues that the first thing that U.S. must do is to reestablish itself as a foremost supporter of the global system that underpins the Western order. In this view, when other countries see the U.S. using its power to strengthen the existing rules and institutions, US authority will be strengthened because they will become more inclined to work in collaboration with U.S. power. Secondly, the U.S. should update the key post-war security pacts, such as NATO and Washington's East Asian alliances. When the U.S. provides security, the U.S. allies, in return, will operate within the western order. Thirdly, the U.S. should renew its support for wide-ranging multilateral institutions. Economically speaking, building on the agreements of the WTO, concluding the current Doha Round of trade talks that seek to extend market opportunities and trade liberalization to developing countries are possible examples. Fourthly, the U.S. should make sure that the order is all-encompassing, meaning there shouldn't be any space left for other rising countries to build up their own “minilateral” order. Lastly, U.S. must support efforts to integrate rising developing countries into key global institutions. Less formal bodies, like G-20 and various other intergovernmental networks, can provide alternative avenues for voice and representation.

== Research ==
In After Victory: Institutions, Strategic Restraint, and the Rebuilding of Order after Major Wars, Ikenberry explores how the United States utilized its hegemony after both World Wars to shape future world order. In both cases, the U.S. attempted to institutionalize its power through the creation of a constitutional order, by which political order was organized around agreed-upon legal and political institutions that operate to allocate rights and limit the exercise of power. In the process, the United States agreed to "tame" its power by placing it within institutions and the set of rules and rights with which this came. One of the advantages for the United States in doing so was locking itself into a guaranteed position for years to come. In the event that its power waned in the future, the institutional framework it created would nonetheless remain intact.

=== The settlement of World War I ===
Following World War I, the distribution of power was greatly skewed towards the United States. President Woodrow Wilson possessed the power to set the terms of peace, and the manner in which the post-war order was constructed. He sought to do so through a model based on upholding collective security and sparking a democratic revolution across the European continent based on American ideals. Great Britain and France were worried about America's preponderance of power, and sought to tie the United States to the continent. Both sides attempted to meet at a middle ground, with European nations gaining security and financial considerations while the United States would institutionalize its power through the League of Nations and maintain its presence on the continent for decades to come. Ultimately, Woodrow Wilson's envisioned order encountered major obstacles, including the failure of the United States to join the League of Nations. Furthermore, the imposition of war guilt and stiff penalties on Germany through the terms set by the Treaty of Versailles set in place conditions favorable for Hitler to rise to power.

=== The settlement of World War II ===
Compared to the end of the First World War, the United States was even more powerful in 1945 following the conclusion of the Second World War. The nation possessed a preponderance of military power and close to half of the world's wealth. Once again, leaders from the United States attempted to leverage this powerful position and create a stable order that would serve to benefit their nation for decades to come. Political and economic openness was the centerpiece of this envisioned framework. It was believed that the closed economic regions which had existed before the war had led to worldwide depression and at least in part contributed to the start of the conflict. Reconstructing a stable Europe was also a priority, as safeguarding American interests was seen as being rooted in European stability. The region also became a staging ground for the Cold War, and building a strong West Germany was seen as an important step in balancing against the Soviet Union. In the end, the United States created its desired order through a series of security, economic, and financial multilateral institutions, including NATO and the Marshall Plan. West Germany was bound to its democratic Western European neighbors through the European Coal and Steel Community (later, the European Communities) and to the United States through Atlantic security pact; Japan was bound to the United States through an alliance partnership and expanding economic ties. The Bretton Woods system meeting in 1944 laid down the monetary and trade rules that facilitated the opening and subsequent flourishing of the world economy. In institutionalizing its power, the United States was willing to act as a "reluctant superpower," making concessions to weaker states in order to ensure their participation in their desired framework.

Ikenberry asserts that the dense, encompassing, and broadly endorsed system of rules and institutions, which are rooted in and also reinforced by democracy and capitalism, laid a basis of cooperation and shared authority over the current U.S.-led global system. He says that system with the institutions that were built around rules and norms of nondiscrimination and market openness, provides low barrier of economic participation and high potential benefits. However, the key point is that while making active use of these institutions to promote the country's development of global power status, the country should work within the order, rather than the outside of it. Thus, no major state can modernize without integrating into the globalized capitalist system.

A 2018 special issue of The British Journal of Politics and International Relations was devoted to After Victory.

== Publications ==
Ikenberry is the author of:

- Reasons of State: Oil Politics and the Capacities of American Government, Cornell University Press, 1988
- The State with John A. Hall, University of Minnesota Press, 1989
- After Victory: Institutions, Strategic Restraint, and the Rebuilding of Order after Major Wars, Princeton University Press, 2001 (New edition, 2019).
- State Power and the World Markets with Joseph Grieco, W. W. Norton, 2002
- Liberal Leviathan: The Origins, Crisis, and Transformation of the American System, Princeton University Press, 2011
- The Rise of Korean Leadership: Emerging Powers and Liberal International Order with Jongryn Mo, New York: Palgrave, 2013
- A World Safe for Democracy: Liberal Internationalism and the Crises of Global Order, Yale University Press, 2020

He has also co-authored or edited:

- The State and American Foreign Economic Policy, Cornell University Press, 1988
- New Thinking in International Relations, Westview Press, 1997
- U.S. Democracy Promotion: Impulses, Strategies, and Impacts, Oxford University Press, 2000
- America Unrivaled: The Future of the Balance of Power, Cornell University Press, 2002
- Reinventing the Alliance: U.S.-Japan Security Partnership in an Era of Change, New York: Palgrave Press, 2003
- International Relations Theory and the Asia-Pacific, Columbia University Press, 2003
- Forging A World of Liberty Under Law: U.S. National Security in the 21st Century, Final report of the Princeton Project on National Security, 2006
- The Uses of Institutions: U.S., Japan, and the Governance of East Asia, New York: Palgrave, 2007
- The United States and Northeast Asia: Debate, Issues, and New Order, Rowman & Littlefield Publishers, 2008
- The Crisis of American Foreign Policy: Wilsonianism in the Twenty-first Century, with Thomas J. Knock, Anne-Marie Slaughter & Tony Smith, Princeton University Press, 2008.
- The Alliance Constrained: The U.S.- Japan Security Alliance and Regional Multilateralism, New York: Palgrave, 2011
- The Troubled Triangle: Japan, the United States, and China: The Duality between Security and Economy, New York: Palgrave, 2013
- Power, Order, and Change in World Politics, Cambridge University Press, 2014.
- America, China, and the Struggle for World Order: Ideas, Traditions, Historical Legacies and Global Visions, New York: Palgrave, 2015
- The Crisis of Liberal Internationalism: Japan and the World Order, The Brookings Institution, 2019
- The Age of Hiroshima, Princeton University, 2020

Ikenberry has published in a number of foreign policy and international relations journals, and writes regularly for Foreign Affairs:

- "Rethinking the Origins of American Hegemony", Political Science Quarterly, Vol. 104, No. 3 (Autumn 1989)
- "New Grand Strategy Uses Lofty and Material Desires", Los Angeles Times, 12 July 1998
- "Why export Democracy?", Wilson Quarterly (Spring 1999)
- America's Liberal Grand Strategy: Democracy and National Security in the Post‐War Era, 2000
- "Getting Hegemony Right" The National Interest, No. 63 (Spring 2001)
- The Rise of China and the Future of the West, Foreign Affairs, January/February 2008
- "China and the Rest Are Only Joining the American‐Built Order", New Perspectives Quarterly, Vol. 25, Issue 3, 2008 (doi:10.1111/j.1540-5842.2008.00995.x)
- The Myth of the Autocratic Revival: Why Liberal Democracy Will Prevail, Foreign Affairs, January/February 2009
- Which Way Is History Marching? Debating the Authoritarian Revival Response, Foreign Affairs, July/August 2009
- The Illusion of Geopolitics: The Enduring Power of the Liberal Order, Foreign Affairs, May/June 2014
- From Hegemony to the Balance of Power: The Rise of China and American Grand Strategy in East Asia, International Journal of Korean Unification Studies, vol.23, no.2, 2014
- Misplaced Restraint: The Quincy Coalition Versus Liberal Internationalism with Daniel Deudney, Survival, 63(4), 2021
- Getting Restraint Right: Liberal Internationalism and American Foreign Policy with Daniel Deudney, Survival, 63(6), 2021
- Review of Richard Ned Lebow, Why Nations Still Fight, Cambridge University Press, 2026, 476 pp., in Foreign Affairs, vol. 105, no. 3 (May/June 2026), p. 171.

== See also ==
- Jeanne Morefield
