= Quad Critical Minerals Initiative Framework =

The Quad Critical Minerals Initiative Framework is a cooperative arrangement among Australia, India, Japan, and the United States (the four Quad countries) to diversify and secure supply chains for critical minerals and rare-earth elements. The framework was announced on 26 May 2026 at the Quad Foreign Ministers’ Meeting in New Delhi, India.

== Background ==
Critical minerals are non-fuel minerals used in batteries, semiconductors, military hardware, renewable energy systems, and other advanced technologies. They include 17 rare‑earth elements (15 lanthanides plus scandium and yttrium). China controls about 60% of the world’s rare‑earth deposits and processes approximately 90% of the global supply. For 12 critical minerals the United States relies entirely on imports, and for 29 additional minerals it imports at least half of its needs. During the Quad Foreign Ministers’ Meeting, the four ministers shared “grave concerns” about export restrictions on critical minerals.

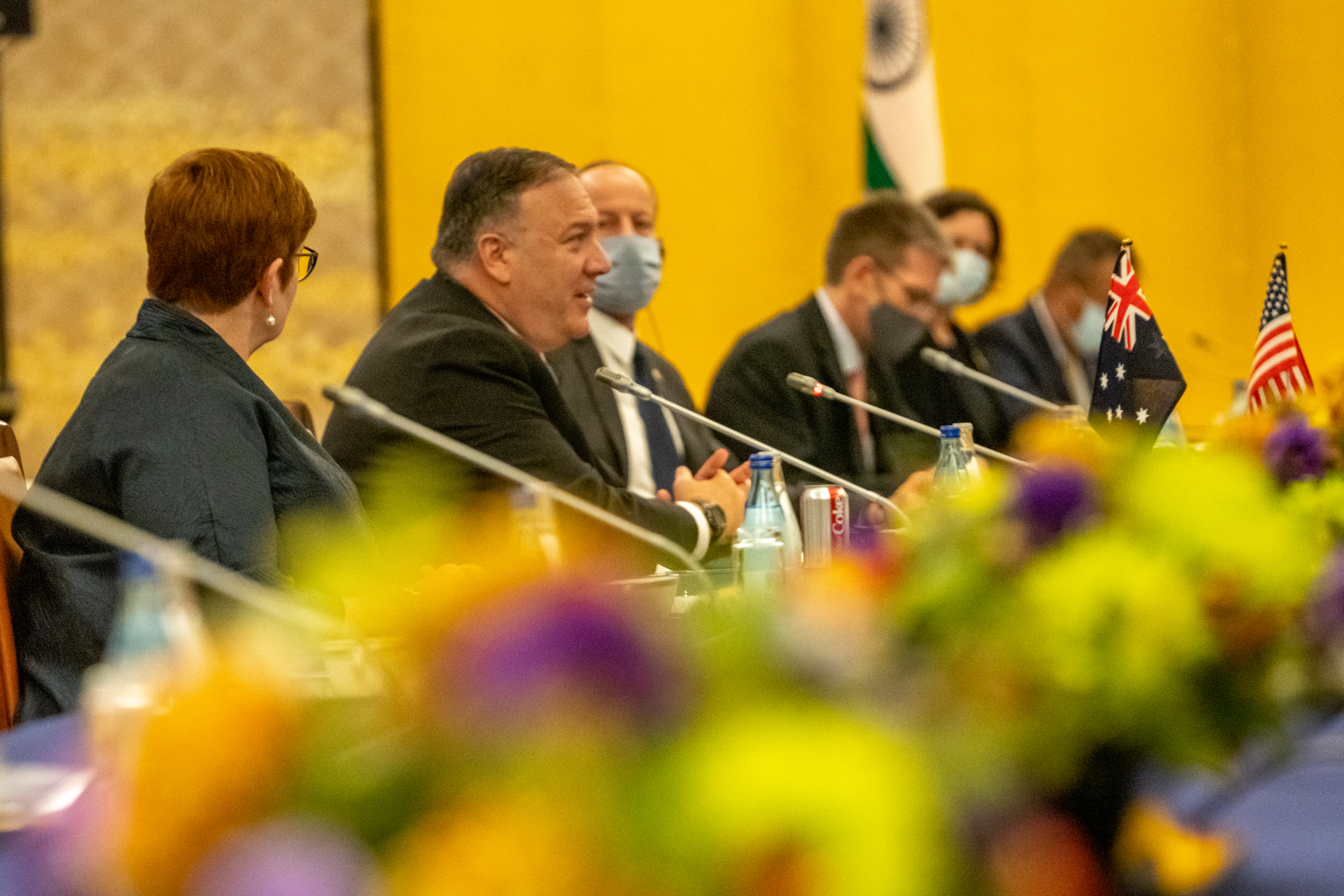
U.S. Secretary of State Mike Pompeo (far left) with Australian Foreign Minister Marise Payne, Japanese Foreign Minister Toshimitsu Motegi, and Indian External Affairs Minister Subrahmanyam Jaishankar during a Quad meeting in Tokyo, October 6, 2020.

The framework follows a separate bilateral critical minerals framework signed by India and the United States on the same day in New Delhi. It was one of several initiatives announced at the meeting, alongside the Indo-Pacific Maritime Surveillance Collaboration and the Quad Initiative on Indo‑Pacific Energy Security.

== Key provisions ==
The framework outlines cooperation in three main areas: investment and project development, regulatory alignment, and recycling and recovery.

=== Investment and project development ===
Quad partners intend to mobilise up to US$20 billion in government and private sector support to strengthen critical minerals supply chains, covering mining, processing, and recycling. The funding is to be channelled through export credit agencies, development finance institutions, private capital mobilisation, guarantees, loans, equity participation, insurance, subsidies, and offtake or other commercial arrangements. Projects with a “Quad nexus”—those located in Quad countries, operated by companies headquartered in Quad countries, or supplying Quad markets—are to be identified to address supply chain gaps.

=== Regulatory alignment ===
The partners aim to improve the investment climate for critical minerals development by sharing good practices on permitting and licensing, developing tools to review transactions that threaten national security, cooperating on geological mapping and resource assessment, and considering coordinated measures to address non‑market policies and unfair trade practices. They also agreed to share information on technical approaches to regulatory processes.

=== Recycling and recovery ===
The framework includes provisions for enhancing recovery of critical minerals from electronic waste and scrap materials. Actions include facilitating investment in recycling technologies, building collection networks, promoting innovation in recovery processes, and exploring streamlined export‑import procedures for relevant waste and scrap among Quad partners, consistent with domestic laws and international obligations.

== Reactions ==
The Quad foreign ministers welcomed the framework as a means to strengthen the resilience of critical mineral supply chains. U.S. Secretary of State Marco Rubio stated that the framework would serve as a guide for member states to coordinate economic policies and investment strategies to reinforce supply chains in mining, processing, and recycling.

== See also ==
- Critical mineral raw materials
- Energy security
- Indo-Pacific
- Indo-Pacific Maritime Surveillance Collaboration
- Quadrilateral Security Dialogue
- Rare-earth element
