= Princeton Project =

The Princeton Project on National Security is a multi-year, bipartisan initiative to develop a sustainable and effective national security strategy for the United States of America. Under the stewardship of honorary co-chairs George P. Shultz and Anthony Lake, the Princeton Project brings together leading thinkers on national security from government, academia, business, and the non-profit sector to analyze key issues and develop innovative responses to a range of national security threats.

Through support from the Ford Foundation, the Hewlett Foundation, Mr. David M. Rubenstein, and the Woodrow Wilson School of Public and International Affairs at Princeton University, the Princeton Project has:

• Convened and published the findings of seven working groups that addressed different aspects of national security—including grand strategy, state security and transnational threats, economics and national security, reconstruction and development, anti-Americanism, relative threat assessment, and foreign policy infrastructure and global institutions;

• Held ten conferences in the United States and abroad to explore major issues pertaining to U.S. national security ranging from the use of preventive force to the role of the private sector;

• Commissioned seventeen working papers on critical security topics.

The Princeton Project culminated with the release of its final report, Forging A World of Liberty Under Law: U.S. National Security in the 21st Century, by project co-directors G. John Ikenberry and Anne-Marie Slaughter.

Released on September 27, 2006, the report proposes that the United States must stand for, seek, and secure a world of liberty under law. It argues that Americans would be safer, richer and healthier in a world of mature liberal democracies.

Getting there requires: 1. Bringing governments up to PAR (Popular, Accountable, Rights-Regarding); 2. Building a liberal order through reform of existing international institutions and the creation of new ones, such as the Concert of Democracies; and 3. Rethinking the role of force in light of the threats of the 21st century.

== Princeton Project Staff ==
Anne-Marie Slaughter, Convener and Co-Director
G. John Ikenberry, Co-Director
Elizabeth L. Colagiuri, Executive Director
Thomas J. Wright, Senior Researcher Dawn Yamane Hewett, Program Manager
