= Sea lines of communication =

Primary maritime routes between ports

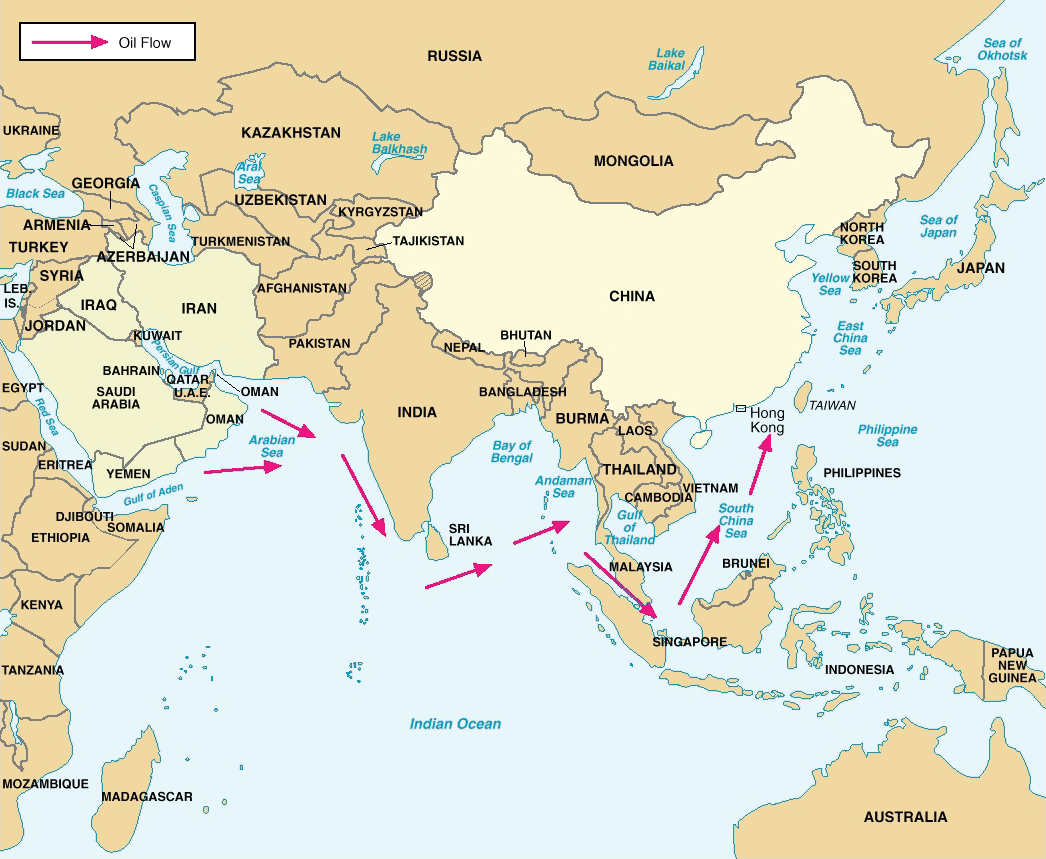
China's Critical Sea Lines of Communication. In 2004, over 80 percent of Chinese crude oil imports transited the Straits of Malacca, with less than 2 percent transiting the Straits of Lombok. Click to enlarge. See also: China's String of Pearls

Sea Lines of Communication (abbreviated as SLOC) is a term describing the primary maritime routes between ports, used for trade, logistics and naval forces. It is generally used in reference to naval operations to ensure that SLOCs are open, or in times of war, to close them. The importance of SLOCs in geopolitics was described in Nicholas J. Spykman's America's Strategy in World Politics published in 1942.

In the American Revolutionary War and the Napoleonic Wars, the SLOCs were, for the most part, in the control of the British Navy. When the British lost control of them during the Revolution, the result was the fall of Yorktown and its biggest army and, ultimately, the war. In the Napoleonic era, maintaining belligerence throughout, the British embargoed and blockade any country associated with Napoleon, which created large economic hardships and dislocations that played a part in the people of France becoming disenchanted with Napoleon.

In World War I and World War II, the British and Germans declared mutual blockade and the Kriegsmarine attempted to close the SLOCs from North America to the British Isles with the use of submarines. In each case the Allies succeeded in keeping the sea lanes open. The Germans in each case failed to defeat the British naval blockade of Germany. The United States Navy in World War II successfully closed the SLOCs to Japan, strangling the resource-poor island nation.

Had the Cold War turned hot, Europe would have required resupply and reinforcement from North America. The Soviet Navy could potentially threaten and contest Atlantic SLOCs to support ground offensives in Europe.

== Economic Importance of Sea Lines of Communication ==
Around 70-90 percent of global trade in volume and 70 percent in value is dependent on maritime transport and therefore open Sea Lines of Communication. Maritime transport is of crucial importance to firm interest, as it allows Transnational Corporations to diversify their supply chains, access larger markets and reduce production cost. Because Sea Lines of Communication enable this international linkage and make it profitable, they are a key driver of overall economic growth and stability. Shipping, making use of open SLOC, as a “blue industry” is therefore important to secure economic growth and national interest.

== Threats to Economic Effectiveness of Sea Lines of Communication ==
There prevail challenges to maritime trade along SLOC, for example piracy and maritime terrorism. These can negatively impact global economic stability. Therefore, warships are used to secure SLOC and facilitate trade and alleviate pressure on national economies.

=== Piracy in the Gulf of Aden ===
Piracy in the Gulf of Aden had a negative economic impact, because it directly affected shipping along one of the most important SLOC connecting Europe to Asia through the Suez Canal. Piracy attacks reduced bilateral trade value between two countries. As a consequence, the cost of Somali piracy activity between the years 2000 and 2016 is estimated to lie between $1 billion to $25 billion annually.These costs are incurred due to a loss of cargo, shipping delays, costs of introducing better security systems and the costs of ransom. Furthermore, shipping costs for firms increased because of higher insurance risk premia, higher wages to account for higher risk of the crew and because firms switched to alternative forms of transportation, e.g. airborne or landbased transport. Shipping costs also increased because of elevated fuel consumption from increasing travelling speed when crossing risk regions and rerouting along longer routes. The direct cost of rerouting due to Somali piracy in the Gulf of Aden amounted to $12 billion in 2010.

=== Grey Zone Activity of Houthis in the Red Sea ===
Houthi activity in the Red Sea between 2023 and 2024 disrupted one of the most significant SLOC globally, connecting the European and Asian markets. Around 12-15 percent of global trade and 30 percent of global container trade pass through the Suez Canal and through the Red Sea annually.

Firstly, Houthi activity in the Red Sea increased operational costs of shipping companies by 18 percent. Most major shipping companies like MSC, BP, and Maersk suspended the route through the Red Sea and Suez Canal and decided to reroute ships via the Cape of Good Hope. The rerouting of 67 percent of traffic increased transit around the Cape of Good Hope Route (CGHR) and added 10 to 14 days per trip for ships. This caused higher fuel consumption as the route is 4,500 nautical miles longer than the Suez Canal Route (SCR), which increased fuel costs by around $1 million per trip for shipping companies. Additionally, rerouting caused a disruption in timetables and port calls, congestion in harbors, and delays. Longer routes also required higher expenses due to higher wages, more maintenance and repairs. Lastly, insurance risk premia increased from 0.07 - 0.2 percent of the cargo value to up to 2 percent if the vessel wanted to enter the Red Sea. Because vessels were at sea longer and companies were mostly operating at full capacity, trade volume decreased and freight rates increased by between 124 and 339 percent.

Secondly, East African countries like Djibouti, Kenya, Tanzania and Sudan were negatively impacted by the trade disruptions via the SCR. They experienced a shortage in perishables and normal containerized goods as between 10 percent (Tanzania) and 34 percent (Sudan) of their foreign trade volume are transiting this route.

Thirdly, the Red Sea Crisis caused disruptions in the financial sector. Increased operational costs of shipping companies reduced dividends and served as a negative signal to investors. Because of this, investors exited the stock market which made stock prices more volatile and disrupted overall financial market stability.

Lastly, Egypt saw declining government revenue due to decreased traffic along the SCR. The Suez Canal Authority reported a loss in canal toll revenues ranging from $175 million to $350 million between December 2023 and January 2024. At the same time, companies explored long-term rerouting along the CGHR which could potentially introduce new trading opportunities for African countries along that route. Demand in bunkering services can create new business ventures and promote infrastructure investments. This could cause economic development in the long-run. Alternatively, shipping companies have considered modal alternatives or alternative routes like the Northern Sea Route (NSR). Nonetheless, there remain viability concerns of this route because of reliance on Russian ports and adverse ecological impacts.

== See also ==
- Choke point
- Indo-Pacific Maritime Surveillance Collaboration
- Line of communication
- String of Pearls (Indian Ocean)
