= One World: The Ethics of Globalisation =

2002 book by Peter Singer

- Cover of the first edition
- Author: Peter Singer
- Language: English
- Subject: Globalization
- Publisher: Yale University Press
- Publication date: 2002
- Publication place: United Kingdom
- Media type: Print (Hardcover and Paperback)
- Pages: 208
- ISBN: 978-0-300-09686-6

One World: The Ethics of Globalisation is a 2002 book about globalization by the philosopher Peter Singer. In the book, Singer applies moral philosophy to four issues: the impact of human activity on the atmosphere; international trade regulation (and the World Trade Organization); the concept of national sovereignty; and the distribution of aid.

One World Now is an updated version of the book, published in 2016.
