= Anne-Marie Slaughter =

American lawyer and political scientist

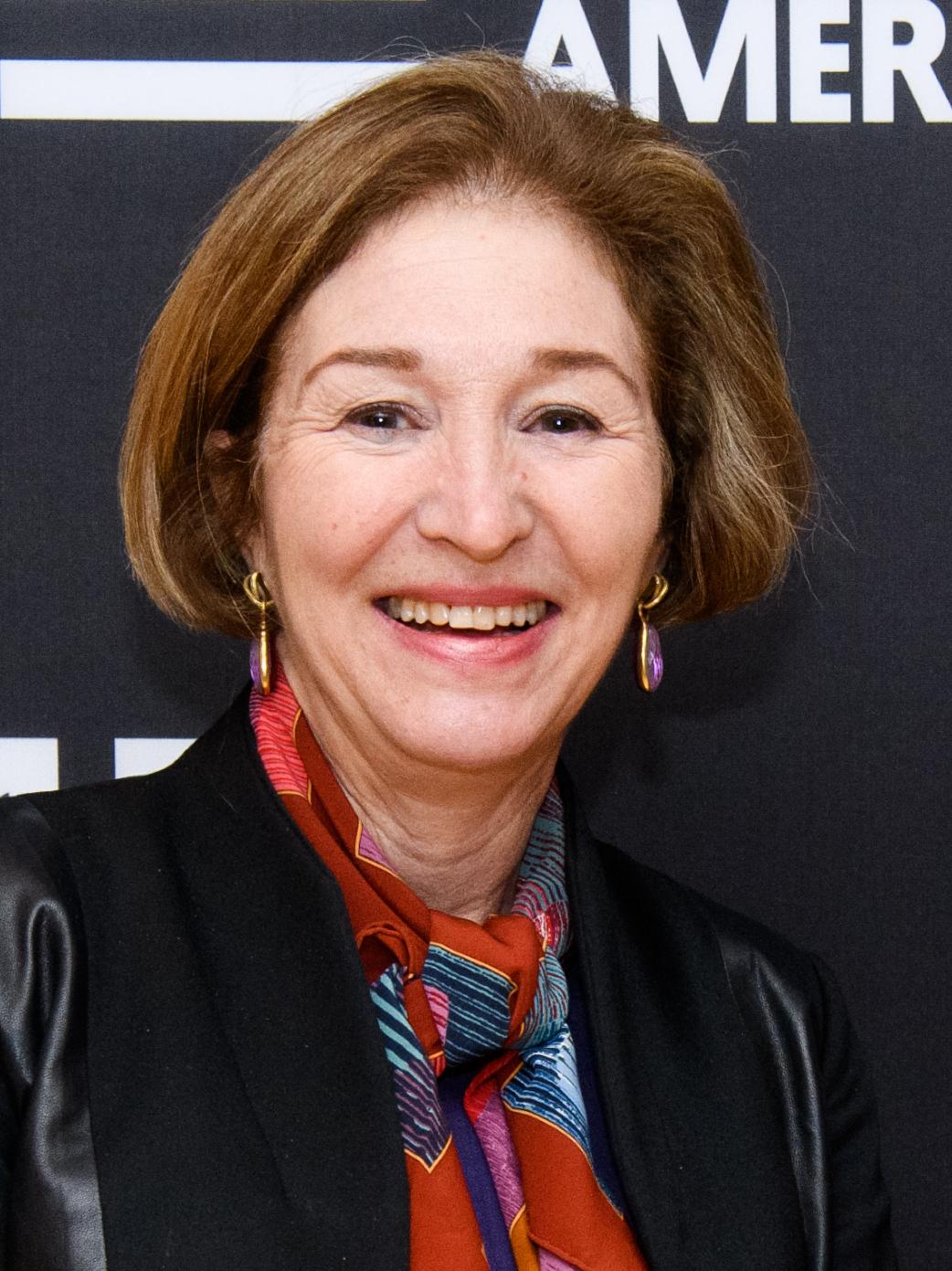
- Slaughter in 2019

25th Director of Policy Planning
- In office January 23, 2009 – January 23, 2011
- President: Barack Obama
- Preceded by: David F. Gordon
- Succeeded by: Jake Sullivan

Personal details
- Born: September 27, 1958 (age 68) Charlottesville, Virginia, U.S.
- Spouse: Andrew Moravcsik
- Education: Princeton University (BA); Worcester College, Oxford (MPhil, DPhil); Harvard University (JD)

Anne-Marie Slaughter (born September 27, 1958) is an American lawyer and political scientist, and author. She was the president and CEO of New America (formerly the New America Foundation), and stepped down after June 30, 2026.

Previously, Slaughter served as the dean of Princeton School of Public and International Affairs from 2002 to 2009. From 2009 to 2011, she was the director of policy planning for the U.S. State Department under U.S. Secretary of State Hillary Clinton, the first woman to hold the position. Later, She also served as a president of the American Society of International Law.

Slaughter has received several awards for her work including: the Woodrow Wilson School R.W. van de Velde Award, 1979; the Thomas Jefferson Medal in Law, University of Virginia and Thomas Jefferson Foundation, 2007; Distinguished Service Medal, U.S. Secretary of state 2011; Louis B. Sohn Award for Public International Law, American Bar association, 2012. She is also on the global advisory board of Oxford University's journal Global Summitry: Politics, Economics, and Law in International Governance.

== Early life and education ==
Slaughter was born in Charlottesville, Virginia to a Belgian mother, Anne Marie Denise Limbosch, and an American father, Edward Ratliff Slaughter Jr., a lawyer. Her paternal grandfather was Edward Slaughter, a football player, athletic coach, and professor of physical education. She graduated from St. Anne's-Belfield School in 1976.

Slaughter attended the Princeton School of Public and International Affairs, where she graduated magna cum laude with an B.A. from in 1980. Mentored by Richard H. Ullman, She received her M.Phil. in international affairs from Worcester College, Oxford, in 1982 and her J.D. cum laude from Harvard Law School in 1985. She received her D.Phil. in international relations from Oxford in 1992.

Slaughter received honorary degrees from the University of Miami in 2006, the University of Warwick in 2013, and Tufts University in 2014. She also received the University of Virginia's Thomas Jefferson Medal in 2007. She is a fellow of the American Academy of Arts and Sciences.

== Academic career ==
Slaughter served on the faculty of the University of Chicago Law School from 1989 to 1994 and then as J. Sinclair Armstrong Professor of International, Foreign, and Comparative Law on the faculty of Harvard Law School from 1994 to 2002. She then moved to Princeton to serve as dean of the Woodrow Wilson School from 2002 to 2009. She became the first woman to hold that position. During her deanship, she oversaw the creation of several research centers and academic programs. During the academic year 2007–2008, Slaughter was a visiting fellow at the Shanghai Institute for International Affairs. Following her government service, she returned to Princeton in 2011 as a professor.

== Public service ==
In January 2009, U.S. Secretary of State Hillary Clinton appointed Slaughter as the director of policy planning. She became the first woman to hold this position. In this role, she was chief architect of the Quadrennial Diplomacy and Development Review, a report intended to guide the State Department's strategic planning.

Slaughter remains a consultant for the State Department and sits on the secretary of state's Foreign Policy Advisory Board.

== Business career ==
She began her law career at the corporate firm Simpson Thacher and is currently on the corporate board of Abt Global (formerly Abt Associates). She was previously on the board of the McDonald's Corporation and that of the Citigroup Economic and Political Strategies Advisory Group.

In 2011, she was elected to the American Philosophical Society.

In 2013, Slaughter was named president and CEO of the New America Foundation, a think-tank based in Washington, D.C.

In 2017, The New York Times alleged that Slaughter had closed the Open Markets research group and dismissed its director Barry Lynn because he had criticized Google, a major donor of New America, and called for it to be broken up. Slaughter denied that Open Markets was closed because of pressure from Google and said Lynn was dismissed because he had "repeatedly violated the standards of honesty and good faith with his colleagues." New America co-chair Jonathan Soros wrote in a letter that Google had neither "attempted to interfere" nor "threaten[ed] funding" over Open Markets research critical of monopolies. In a letter to New America's board and leadership, 25 former and current New America fellows said that although they had "never experienced any efforts by donors or managers at New America to influence [their] work," they "were troubled by the initial lack of transparency and communication from New America's leadership" and "remained deeply concerned about this sequence of events".

Slaughter has served on the boards of numerous non-profit organizations, including the Council of Foreign Relations, the New America Foundation, the National Endowment for Democracy, the National Security Network and the Brookings Doha Center. She is a member of the advisory board of the Center for New American Security, the Truman Project, and the bipartisan Development Council of the Center for Strategic and International Studies. In 2006, she chaired the Secretary of State's Advisory Committee on Democracy Promotion. From 2004 to 2007, she was a co-director of the Princeton Project on National Security.

Slaughter has participated in Dialog, a secretive, invite-only social club founded by Peter Thiel and Auren Hoffman.

== Writing ==
Slaughter has written extensively on European Union politics, network theories of world politics, transjudicial communication, liberal theories of international law and international relations, American foreign policy, international law, and various types of policy analysis. She has written books: International Law and International Relations (2000), A New World Order (2004), The Idea that is America: Keeping Faith with our Values in a Dangerous World (2007), and The Crisis of American Foreign Policy: Wilsonianism in the Twenty-first Century (with G. John Ikenberry, Thomas J. Knock, and Tony Smith) (2008), as well as three edited volumes on international relations and international law, and over one hundred extended articles in scholarly and policy journals or books.

The article in The Atlantic became the basis of the 2015 book Unfinished Business: Women Men Work Family. The book argues that a number of challenges remain for the women's movement in the US. It allows her to expands on her position in the article and respond to her critics. In Unfinished Business, she attempts to create a framework to understand the problems faced by all working parents, not just women.

Since leaving the State Department, Slaughter remains a frequent commentator on foreign policy issues. She has written a regular opinion column for Project Syndicate since January 2012.

Slaughter's article titled "Why Women Still Can't Have it All" appeared in the July/August 2012 issue of The Atlantic. In the first four days after publication, the piece attracted 725,000 unique readers, making it the most popular article ever published in that magazine. In the same period, it received over 119,000 Facebook "Recommends," making it by far the most "liked" piece ever to appear in any version of the magazine. Within several days, it had been discussed in detail on the front page of The New York Times and in many other media outlets, attracting attention from around the world. Although Slaughter originally tried to call the article "Why Women Can't Have it All Yet," she has since stated that it was a mistake to use the phrase "Have it All" in general. In 2015, Slaughter clarified that she hoped to stimulate a discussion about a wide range of working mothers, not only those in prestigious or lucrative careers.

== Personal life ==
Slaughter is married to Princeton politics professor Andrew Moravcsik, with whom she has two children: Alex and Michael Moravcsik.

== Selected works ==
- Slaughter, Anne-Marie (2021). Renewal: From Crisis to Transformation in Our Lives, Work, and Politics. The Public Square. Princeton University Press. ISBN 978-0-691-21056-8.
- Slaughter, Anne-Marie (2017). The Chessboard and the Web: Strategies of Connection in a Networked World. New Haven: Yale University Press. ISBN 9780300215649.
- Slaughter, Anne-Marie (2015). Unfinished Business: Women Men Work Family. New York: Random House. ISBN 9780345812896.
- Slaughter, Anne-Marie (2007). The Idea That Is America: Keeping Faith with Our Values in a Dangerous World. New York: Basic Books. ISBN 9780465078080.
- Slaughter, Anne-Marie (2004). A New World Order. Princeton: Princeton University Press. ISBN 9780691123974.
