= Richard K. Betts =

American political scientist (born 1975)

- Born: August 15, 1947 (age 79); Easton, Pennsylvania, U.S.
- Education: Harvard University (B.A., M.A., and Ph.D.)
- Occupations: Professor, author, pundit, policy scholar
- Organization: School of International and Public Affairs, Columbia University
- Spouse: Adela M. Bolet
- Children: 3

Richard Kevin Betts (born August 15, 1947) is an American political scientist and international relations scholar who centers on U.S. foreign policy. He is the Leo A. Shifrin Professor of War and Peace Studies Emeritus in the Department of Political Science, former director of the International Security Policy Program in the School of International and Public Affairs at Columbia University, and former director of the Saltzman Institute of War and Peace Studies.

== Early life and education ==
Betts was born in Easton, Pennsylvania and raised in Newton, Massachusetts, graduating from Newton High School in 1965. He went on to attend and graduate from Harvard University earning a bachelor's, master's, and doctorate in government in 1965, 1971 and 1975 respectively. His dissertation, under the direction of Samuel P. Huntington was on the role of military advice in decisions to resort to force, which later became his first book, Soldiers, Statesmen, and Cold War Crises. His dissertation was awarded the Sumner Prize, for best dissertation in international relations. While a student at Harvard, Betts served as a teaching fellow from 1971 to 1975. He joined the faculty as lecturer for the 1975–1976 academic year.

In 1976 Betts joined the Brookings Institution where he served as a research associate and later in 1981 a senior fellow until 1990. While at Brookings, Betts was a professorial lecturer at Johns Hopkins University's Paul H. Nitze School of Advanced International Studies, Harvard, and Columbia University. He was a staff member of the original U.S. Senate Select Committee on Intelligence (the Church Committee)in 1975-76, the National Security Council in 1977, on the foreign policy staff of the Walter Mondale presidential campaign in 1984, and Commissioner of the National Commission on Terrorism 2000-01.

== Later career ==
In 1990, Betts joined the faculty at Columbia University. There, he led the international security policy program at the School of International and Public Affairs, became the director of the Institute of War and Peace Studies. Betts taught the introductory course war, peace, and strategy for graduate and undergraduate students for over 25 years.

In 1996, Betts joined the Council on Foreign Relations as the Director of National Security Studies. He served in the role until 2000, when he transitioned into an adjunct senior fellow role, which he currently retains.

His writings have earned five prizes, including the Woodrow Wilson Award of the American Political Science Association for the best book in political science.

== Books ==
=== Sole author ===
- Soldiers, Statesmen, and Cold War Crises (Cambridge: Harvard University Press, 1977; 2d edition Columbia University Press, 1991)
- Surprise Attack: Lessons for Defense Planning (Washington, DC: Brookings Institution, 1982)
- Nuclear Blackmail and Nuclear Balance (Washington, DC: Brookings Institution, 1987)
- Military Readiness: Concepts, Choices, Consequences (Washington, DC: Brookings Institution, 1995)
- Enemies of Intelligence: Knowledge and Power in National Security (New York: Columbia University Press, 2007)
- American Force: Dangers, Delusions, and Dilemmas in National Security (New York: Columbia University Press, 2012)

=== Co-author and editor ===
- (with Leslie H. Gelb) The Irony of Vietnam: The System Worked (Washington, D.C.: Brookings Institution, 1979)
- (with Joseph Yager [editor] and others) Nonproliferation and U.S. Foreign Policy (Washington, D.C.: Brookings Institution, 1980) (six chapters by Betts)
- (editor and contributor) Cruise Missiles: Technology, Strategy, Politics (Washington, D.C.: Brookings Institution, 1981),
- (editor and contributor) Conflict After the Cold War: Arguments on Causes of War and Peace (New York: Allyn & Bacon, 1994)
- (co-editor with Thomas Mahnken, and contributor) Paradoxes of Strategic Intelligence: Essays in Honor of Michael I. Handel (London: Frank Cass, 2003)

== Articles ==
- "The Soft Underbelly of American Primacy: Tactical Advantages of Terror," in Political Science Quarterly (Spring 2002), reprinted on September 11, Terrorist Attacks, and U.S. Foreign Policy, edited by Demetrios James Caraley (Academy of Political Science, 2002).
