= Peter Clement =

Peter Clement may refer to:

- Peter Clement (footballer) (born 1946), Austrian footballer
- Peter Clement (political scientist), American political scientist

== See also ==
- Peter Clements, Australian cricketer
