= Robert Jervis =

American political scientist and academic (1940–2021)

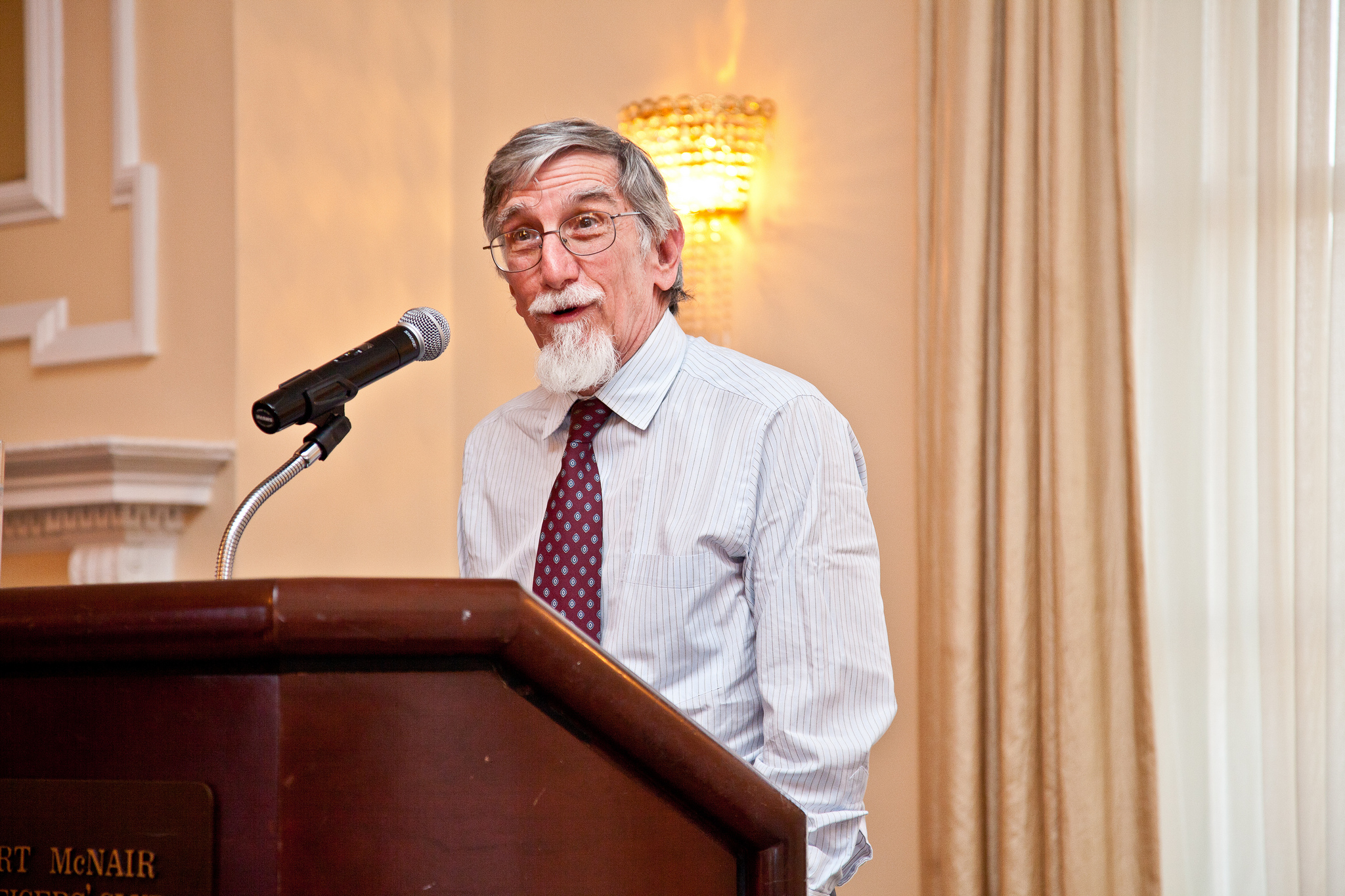
- Born: April 30, 1940
- Died: December 9, 2021 (aged 81)

Academic background
- Education: Oberlin College (BA); University of California, Berkeley (PhD)
- Influences: Glenn Snyder; Thomas Schelling

Academic work
- Discipline: Political science
- Institutions: Harvard University; University of California, Los Angeles; Columbia University
- Doctoral students: Rose McDermott; Randall Schweller; Jeffry Frieden; Mira Rapp-Hooper; Keren Yarhi-Milo
- Influenced: Shiping Tang

Robert Louis Jervis (April 30, 1940 – December 9, 2021) was an American political scientist who was the Adlai E. Stevenson Professor of International Politics in the Department of Political Science at Columbia University. Jervis was co-editor of the Cornell Studies in Security Affairs, a series published by Cornell University Press.

He is known for his contributions to political psychology, international relations theory, nuclear strategy, and intelligence studies. According to the Open Syllabus Project, Jervis is one of the most-frequently cited authors on college syllabi for political science courses. Foreign Affairs has referred to him as "the renowned and beloved international relations theorist."

== Early life and education ==
Robert Jervis was born in New York City in 1940. He earned a BA from Oberlin College in 1962. At Oberlin, he developed an interest in nuclear strategy, and was influenced by Thomas Schelling’s Strategy of Conflict and Glenn Snyder’s Deterrence and Defense. In 1962, he began graduate work at University of California, Berkeley, where he studied under Glenn Snyder. He received a PhD from UC Berkeley in 1968.

== Career ==
From 1968 to 1972, he was an assistant professor of government at Harvard University and was an associate professor from 1972 to 1974. According to Jervis, Schelling brought him to Harvard. In 1974, Jervis was a candidate for the tenured chair vacated by Henry Kissinger when he started working in the Richard Nixon administration, but the Government department at Harvard did not consider Jervis qualified. At Harvard, he developed a close friendship with Schelling and Kenneth Waltz. From 1974 to 1980, he was a professor of political science at the University of California, Los Angeles. He was a member of the Columbia University faculty from 1980 until his death in 2021. He was a member of the Arnold A. Saltzman Institute of War and Peace Studies in the School of International and Public Affairs. He was president of the American Political Science Association in 2000–2001.

Jervis consulted for the CIA, and served as head of the agency's Historical Review Panel for 20 years.

He worked on perceptions and misperceptions in foreign policy decision-making. Jervis played a key role in introducing insights from psychology to International Relations scholarship. Charles Glaser described Jervis's work on the security dilemma as "among the most important works in international relations of the past few decades."

According to Jack Snyder, "Jervis's body of thought can be categorized in terms of five interrelated themes: communication in strategic bargaining, perception and misperception in international politics, cooperation in anarchy, the nuclear revolution, and complex system effects and unintended consequences." According to Thomas J. Christensen and Keren Yarhi-Milo, "in seeking to understand both behavior and outcomes in world affairs, Jervis championed the role of individuals’ perceptions and formative experiences rather than just broad political, social, and economic forces... [His] work was always rooted in the complexities of actual decision-making by real people with quirks and flaws."

Jervis was a member of the American Association for the Advancement of Science, the American Academy of Arts and Sciences, and the American Philosophical Society. In 2006 he was awarded the NAS Award for Behavior Research Relevant to the Prevention of Nuclear War from the National Academy of Sciences. He participated in the 2010 Hertog Global Strategy Initiative, a high-level research program on nuclear proliferation.

In 2021, he was elected member of the U.S. National Academy of Sciences. Jervis was the recipient of the 1990 University of Louisville Grawemeyer Award for Ideas Improving World Order.

== Personal life and death ==
Jervis met his wife Kathe (née Weil) Jervis in 1961 on a student trip to the Soviet Union. Together they had two daughters, Alexa and Lisa. Lisa Jervis is a co-founder of Bitch magazine.

In the early 1960s, while studying for his PhD in Political Science at the University of California at Berkeley, Jervis participated in the Free Speech Movement.

Jervis died of lung cancer in his Manhattan home on December 9, 2021, at the age of 81. He is honored at Columbia University with an annual conference bearing his name.

== Selected publications ==
Books

- The Logic of Images in International Relations (Princeton, 1970) ISBN 978-0-231-06932-8
- Perception and Misperception in International Politics (Princeton, 1976) ISBN 978-0-691-10049-4
- The Illogic of American Nuclear Strategy (Cornell, 1985) ISBN 9781501738654
- The Meaning of the Nuclear Revolution (Cornell, 1989) ISBN 978-0801495656
- System Effects: Complexity in Political and Social Life (Princeton, 1997) ISBN 978-0-86682-003-5
- American Foreign Policy in a New Era (Routledge, 2005) ISBN 978-0-41595-101-2
- Why Intelligence Fails: Lessons From The Iranian Revolution And The Iraq War (Cornell, 2010) ISBN 978-0-8014-4785-3
- How Statesmen Think: The Psychology of International Politics (Essay Collection) (Princeton, 2017) ISBN 978-0-691-17644-4

Articles

- Jervis, Robert (September 2012). "System Effects Revisited". Critical Review. 24 (3): 393–415. doi:10.1080/08913811.2012.767048. S2CID 143974640.
- Jervis, Robert (January 2009). "Black Swans in Politics". Critical Review. 21 (4): 475–489. doi:10.1080/08913810903441419. S2CID 144232450.
- Jervis, Robert (August 2008). "Bridges, Barriers, and Gaps: Research and Policy". Political Psychology. 29 (4): 571–592. doi:10.1111/j.1467-9221.2008.00650.x. JSTOR 20447145.
- Jervis, Robert (September 2006). "Understanding Beliefs". Political Psychology. 27 (5): 641–663. doi:10.1111/j.1467-9221.2006.00527.x. ISSN 0162-895X. JSTOR 3792533.
- Jervis, Robert (April 2004). "The Implications of Prospect Theory for Human Nature and Values". Political Psychology. 25 (2): 163–176. doi:10.1111/j.1467-9221.2004.00367.x. JSTOR 3792560.
- Jervis, Robert (July 1999). "Realism, Neoliberalism, and Cooperation: Understanding the Debate". International Security. 24 (1): 42–63. doi:10.1162/016228899560040. S2CID 57572295.
- Jervis, Robert (Winter 1997–1998). "Complexity and the Analysis of Political and Social Life". Political Science Quarterly. 112 (4): 569–593. doi:10.2307/2657692. JSTOR 2657692.
- Jervis, Robert (January 1978). "Cooperation under the Security Dilemma". World Politics. 30 (2): 167–214. doi:10.2307/2009958. hdl:2027/uc1.31158011478350. JSTOR 2009958. S2CID 154923423.
