= Paul Hammond =

Paul Hammond may refer to:

- Paul Hammond (footballer) (born 1953), British football player
- Paul Hammond (ballet dancer) (1922–2010), Australian dancer
- Paul Hammond (musician) (1952–1992), English rock drummer
- Paul Y. Hammond (1929–2012), American foreign policy scholar
