= Ivo H. Daalder =

American diplomat

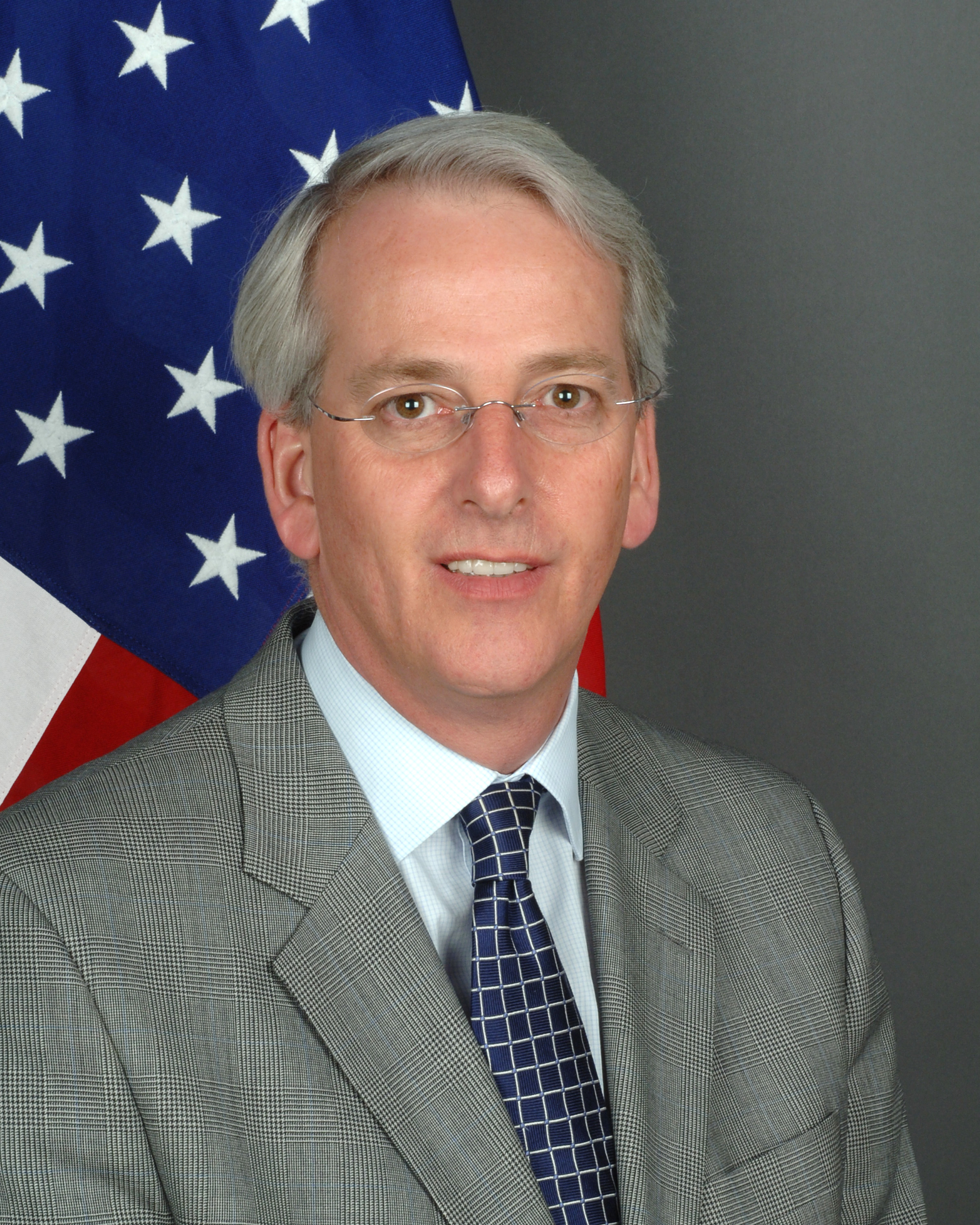

22nd United States Ambassador to NATO
- In office May 7, 2009 – July 6, 2013
- President: Barack Obama
- Preceded by: Kurt Volker
- Succeeded by: Douglas Lute

Personal details
- Born: March 2, 1960 (age 66) The Hague, Netherlands
- Party: Democratic
- Spouse: Elisa Harris
- Children: 2
- Education: University of Kent (BA); Georgetown University (MA); University of Oxford (MLitt); Massachusetts Institute of Technology (PhD)

Ivo H. Daalder (born March 2, 1960, in The Hague, Netherlands) is a U.S. diplomat who served as the U.S. Permanent Representative on the Council of the North Atlantic Treaty Organization (NATO) from May 2009 to July 2013 under President Barack Obama.

He was a member of the staff of United States National Security Council (NSC) during the administration of President Bill Clinton.

== Education and academic career ==
Daalder was educated at the University of Kent, Oxford University, and Georgetown University, and received his Ph.D. in political science from the Massachusetts Institute of Technology.

He was fellow at Harvard University's Center for Science and International Affairs and the International Institute for Strategic Studies in London. He received a Pew Faculty Fellowship in International Affairs and an International Affairs Fellowship of the Council on Foreign Relations.

Daalder was an associate professor at the University of Maryland's School of Public Affairs, where he was also director of research at the Center for International and Security Studies. He was a Senior Fellow in foreign policy studies at the Brookings Institution.

== Career ==
=== Clinton administration ===
In 1995–1997, Daalder served as a director for European Affairs on the National Security Council staff under President Bill Clinton, where he was responsible for coordinating U.S. policy toward Bosnia.

From 1998 to 2001, Daalder served as a member of the Study Group of the U.S. Commission on National Security/21st Century (the Hart-Rudman Commission), a multi-year examination of U.S. national security requirements and institutions.

=== Obama administration ===
On March 11, 2009, President Obama nominated Daalder to become the United States Permanent Representative to NATO, a post commonly referred to as "U.S. Ambassador to NATO".

One of the issues that Daalder has addressed is the lack of communication on security issues between NATO and the European Union. In October 2010 he wrote in the International Herald Tribune: "NATO and E.U. capabilities need to be in synch, and their operations need to be complementary. We should regularly engage in a robust and transparent exchange of views on a wide range of shared interests. Policy should support work in the field; those in harm's way shouldn't have to work around our failures in Brussels."

On March 27, the North Atlantic Council voted unanimously to take charge of what became known as Operation Unified Protector. The Operation had three missions; to police the arms embargo, to patrol the no-fly zone, and to protect civilians. Fourteen NATO allies took part in the actual operations, along with contingents from Jordan, Morocco, Qatar, and the United Arab Emirates. In Libya, unlike other military intervention in Kosovo, Iraq and Afghanistan, the United States played a largely supporting role, providing intelligence, aerial surveillance and refueling, while other NATO allies, including France, the United Kingdom, Denmark and Belgium, flew most of the bombing missions.

The first two missions were quickly put into place, but, due to the presence of Gaddafi forces in or near civilian areas, NATO was unable to strike with full force. By August 2011, however, the opposition forces were strong enough to seize Tripoli and within two months had taken control of the entire country. On October 23, 2011–233 days after Operation Unified Protector had begun—the NATO North Atlantic Council declared its mission complete.

=== Return to private life ===
Daalder served as President of the Chicago Council on Global Affairs from 2013 to 2023. He then served as the organization's CEO from 2023 to 2025.

Daalder was appointed Professor and holder of the Kooijmans Chair in Peace, Justice and Security at Leiden University on September 1, 2026.

=== Bibliography ===
==== Books ====
- The Empty Throne: America's Abdication of Global Leadership, with James M. Lindsay (PublicAffairs (October, 2018)) ISBN 978-1541773851
- In the Shadow of the Oval Office: Portraits of the National Security Advisers and the Presidents they Serve—From JFK to George W. Bush, with I.M. Destler. (Simon & Schuster, 2009). ISBN 9781416553199 OCLC 232979162
- Beyond Preemption: Force and Legitimacy in a Changing World (edited, 2007). ISBN 9780815716860 OCLC 173666835
- The Crescent of Crisis: U.S.-European Strategy for the Greater Middle East, co-edited with Nicole Gnesotto and Phil Gordon (2006). ISBN 0815716907 OCLC 61878855
- America Unbound: The Bush Revolution in Foreign Policy, with James M. Lindsay (2003). Winner of 2003 Lionel Gelber Prize. Revised and updated edition published by John Wiley & Sons in 2005. Translated into Chinese, Dutch, Korean, Italian and Polish. ISBN 0815716885 OCLC 52773456
- Protecting the American Homeland: One Year on, with Michael E. O'Hanlon (editor), I. M. Destler, David L. Gunter, Robert Litan, Peter Orszag, and James Steinberg (2003).
- Protecting the American Homeland: A Preliminary Analysis, with Michael E. O'Hanlon (editor), I. M. Destler, David L. Gunter, Robert Litan, Peter Orszag, and James Steinberg (2002).
- Winning Ugly: NATO's War to Save Kosovo, with Michael E. O'Hanlon (2000). ISBN 0815716966 OCLC 43951944
- Getting to Dayton: The Making of America's Bosnia Policy (2000). ISBN 0815716923 OCLC 42619716

==== Newspaper articles ====
- "America's new global challenge", with Anne-Marie Slaughter Boston Globe, July 24, 2008.
- "Talking to Iran Is Our Best Option", with Philip Gordon The Washington Post, June 29, 2008.
- "The United Nations Can Save Burma", with Paul Stares International Herald Tribune and Boston Globe, May 13, 2008.
- "NATO: A Mockery of Enlargement", with James Goldgeier, International Herald Tribune, April 8, 2008.
- "Presidential Politics Can Help Iraq Policy", with Philip Gordon, Boston Globe, March 29, 2008.
- "Iraq After the Surge" NRC Handelsblad, December 8, 2007.
- "A Nuclear-Free World", with John Holum, Boston Globe, October 5, 2007.
- "Nuclear Weapons in the Age of al-Qaeda", with Jeffrey Lewis, Financial Times, August 13, 2007.
- "The Next Intervention: Legitimacy Matters", with Robert Kagan, The Washington Post, August 6, 2007.
- "U.S. and Europe Must Learn About Alliances", with James Goldgeier, Financial Times, December 14, 2006.
- "Global Challenges for NATO", with James Goldgeier, El País, November 27, 2006.
- "NATO: For Global Security, Expand the Alliance", with James Goldgeier, International Herald Tribune, October 12, 2006.
- "Five Years After 9/11 – A Balance Sheet", NRC Handelsblad, September 6, 2006.
- "Is War With Iran Inevitable?", NRC Handelsblad, April 21, 2006.
- "Still Time for a Good Deal With India", with Michael Levi, Washington Post, March 10, 2006.
- "Face-to-Face: The Recent Spike of Violence in Iraq", Washington Examiner, March 2, 2006.
- "The Limits of Rice's Diplomacy", NRC Handelsblad, January 17, 2006.
- "We Should Strike Iran, But Not With Bombs", with Philip Gordon, Washington Post, January 22, 2006.

==== Other publications ====
- "NATO's Victory in Libya- the Right Way to Run an Intervention." Foreign Affairs, March–April 2012.
- "In the Shadow of the Oval Office: The Next National Security Adviser", with I. M. Destler, Foreign Affairs, January/February 2009, pp. 114–29.
- "The Logic of Zero", with Jan Lodal, Foreign Affairs, November/December 2008, pp. 80–95.
- "America and the Use of Force: Sources of Legitimacy", with Robert Kagan, in Chollet, Lindberg and Shorr (eds). Bridging the Foreign Policy Divide, 2008.
- "Restore Trust in America's Leadership", with James M. Lindsay, Democracy: A Journal of Ideas, Fall 2007.
- "Coping with Failure in Iraq", Vrij Nederland, June 16, 2007.
- (With James M. Lindsay) "Democracies of the World, Unite: The Debate Continues", The American Interest, Vol. II, No. 4 (March/April 2007), pp. 137–139
- "Democracies of the World, Unite", with James M. Lindsay, The American Interest, January/February 2007.
- "Renewing the Nuclear Bargain", with Michael H. Fuchs and Morton H. Halperin, in Halperin, Laurenti, Rundlet and Boyer (eds) Power and Superpower: Global Leadership and Exceptionalism in the 21st Century, 2007.
- "Global NATO", with James Goldgeier, Foreign Affairs, September/October 2006, pp. 105–113.

== Personal life ==
Ambassador Daalder is married to Elisa D. Harris, and they have two sons, Marc and Michael.

Diplomatic posts
Preceded by Kurt Volker	United States Ambassador to NATO; 2009–2013	Succeeded by Douglas Lute
