= Edward Bermingham =

Edward Bermingham may refer to:

- Edward Bermingham, 13th Baron Athenry (died 1709), Anglo-Irish lord
- Edward J. Bermingham (1887–1958), American investment banker
