= James M. Lindsay =

American foreign policy scholar

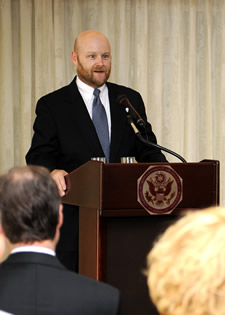
James M. Lindsay in 2009.

James M. Lindsay (born November 29, 1959, Winchester, Massachusetts), is the Mary and David Boies distinguished senior fellow in U.S. foreign policy at the Council on Foreign Relations (CFR) and a leading authority on U.S. foreign policy. He is also the award-winning coauthor of America Unbound: The Bush Revolution in Foreign Policy and former director for global issues and multilateral affairs at the National Security Council. In 2008, he was the principal author of a Department of Defense funded $7.6 million Minerva Research Initiative grant entitled "Climate Change, State Stability, and Political Risk in Africa." He writes regularly for the Council on Foreign Relations on the history and domestic underpinnings of U.S. foreign policy. He also hosts the weekly CFR podcast The President's Inbox where he speaks with leading experts on how the U.S. should respond to evolving global challenges.

== Academic work ==
Lindsay holds an A.B. in economics and political science (highest distinction, highest honors) from the University of Michigan and an M.A., M. Phil., and Ph.D. from Yale University.

He has authored, co-authored, or edited more than fifteen books and fifty journal articles and book chapters on various aspects of American foreign policy and international relations. His latest book, The Empty Throne: America's Abdication of Global Leadership, co-authored with Ivo H. Daalder and released in October 2018. His previous book with Ivo H. Daalder, America Unbound: The Bush Revolution in Foreign Policy, was awarded the 2003 Lionel Gelber Award, named a finalist for the Arthur S. Ross Book Award, and selected as a top book of 2003 by The Economist.

With Henry J. Aaron and Pietro S. Nivola, he co-edited Agenda for the Nation, which Choice Magazine named “Outstanding Academic Book of 2004.” In 2001, with Michael E. O'Hanlon, he wrote Defending America: The Case for Limited National Missile Defense.

He is the author of Congress and the Politics of U.S. Foreign Policy, published in 1994; and Congress and Nuclear Weapons, published in 1991. He has also contributed articles to the op-ed pages of many major newspapers, including the New York Times, the Washington Post, and the Los Angeles Times.

== Research and government positions ==
From 2006 to 2009, Lindsay was the inaugural director of The Robert S. Strauss Center for International Security and Law at The University of Texas at Austin as well as the first Tom Slick Chair for International Affairs at the Lyndon B. Johnson School of Public Affairs. From 2003 to 2006, he was vice president, director of studies, and Maurice R. Greenberg Chair at the Council on Foreign Relations. From 1999 to 2003, he served as deputy director and senior fellow in the Foreign Policy Studies Program at the Brookings Institution. From 1987 to 1999, he was a professor of political science at the University of Iowa, where he was the recipient of the Collegiate Teaching Award and of the James N. Murray Faculty Teaching Award. In 1996-1997, he was director for global issues and multilateral affairs on the staff of the National Security Council during the Clinton administration.

He has also served as a consultant to the United States Commission on National Security/21st Century (Hart-Rudman Commission) and as a staff expert for the United States Institute of Peace’s Congress-mandated Task Force on the United Nations. He has been a fellow at the Center for International Affairs and the Center for Science and International Affairs, both at Harvard University. He was a recipient of the Pew Faculty Fellowship in International Affairs in 1990 and an International Affairs Fellowship from the Council on Foreign Relations in 1995.

== Professional boards, committees, and organizations ==
- Council on Foreign Relations, 2000–Present
- Editorial Board, International Studies Quarterly, 1999-2002
- Executive Committee, Midwest Consortium for International Security, 1992-1999
- Editorial Board, PS: Political Science & Politics, 1993-1996
- Editorial Board, International Studies Perspectives, 2004–2006

== Publications ==
=== Books ===
- The Empty Throne: America's Abdication of Global Leadership, with Ivo H. Daalder (2018)
- Agenda for the Nation, with Henry J. Aaron and Pietro S. Nivola (2004)
- America Unbound: The Bush Revolution in Foreign Policy, with Ivo H. Daalder (2003)
- Defending America: The Case for Limited National Missile Defense, with Michael E. O'Hanlon (2001)
- Congress and the Politics of U.S. Foreign Policy (1994)
- Congress and Nuclear Weapons (1991)
- Congress Resurgent: Foreign and Defense Policy on Capitol Hill (ed. With Randall B. Ripley)
- U.S. Foreign Policy After the Cold War (ed. With Randall B. Ripley)
- Dynamics of Democracy, 5ed. (with Peverill Squire, Cary Covington, and Eric R.A.N. Smith)

=== Articles ===
- "The Price of Trump's Power Politics", with Ivo H. Daalder, Foreign Affairs, January 2025
- "The West Holds Firm", with Ivo H. Daalder, Foreign Affairs, September 2022
- "Last Best Hope", with Ivo H. Daalder, Foreign Affairs, June 2022
- "Why Putin Underestimated the West", with Ivo H. Daalder, Foreign Affairs, April 2022
- "America's Treacherous Transition", Foreign Affairs, November 2020
- "The Committee to Save the World Order", with Ivo H. Daalder, Foreign Affairs, November/December 2018
- "Foreign Policy and Obama's State of the Union Address", Foreign Affairs, January 2012
- "The 2012 Election and the Republicans' Foreign Policy," Foreign Affairs, November 2011
- "After Iran Gets the Bomb","Foreign Affairs, March/April 2010
- "Congress and Foreign Policy: Why the Hill Matters."(1994) Political Science Quarterly 107 (Winter):607-628
