= Arnold A. Saltzman Institute of War and Peace Studies =

American research institute

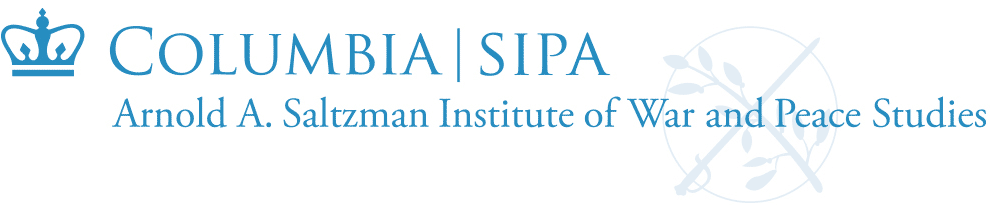
- Named after: Arnold A. Saltzman
- Founded: 1951
- Founder: Dwight D. Eisenhower
- Type: Research Center
- Location: Morningside Heights, New York City, New York, U.S.
- Director: Stacie E. Goddard
- Key people: William T. R. Fox; Warner R. Schilling; Richard K. Betts
- Parent organization: Columbia University
- Website: www.siwps.org
- Formerly called: Institute of War and Peace Studies

The Arnold A. Saltzman Institute of War and Peace Studies (SIWPS) is a research center that is part of Columbia University's School of International and Public Affairs in New York. It was founded in 1951 by President of Columbia Dwight D. Eisenhower as the Institute of War and Peace Studies (IWPS) and was led for its first 25 years by Professor William T. R. Fox. It was given its current name in 2003. By its own description, the institute's researchers analyze "the political, military, historical, legal, economic, moral, psychological, and philosophical dimensions of international relations."

== History ==
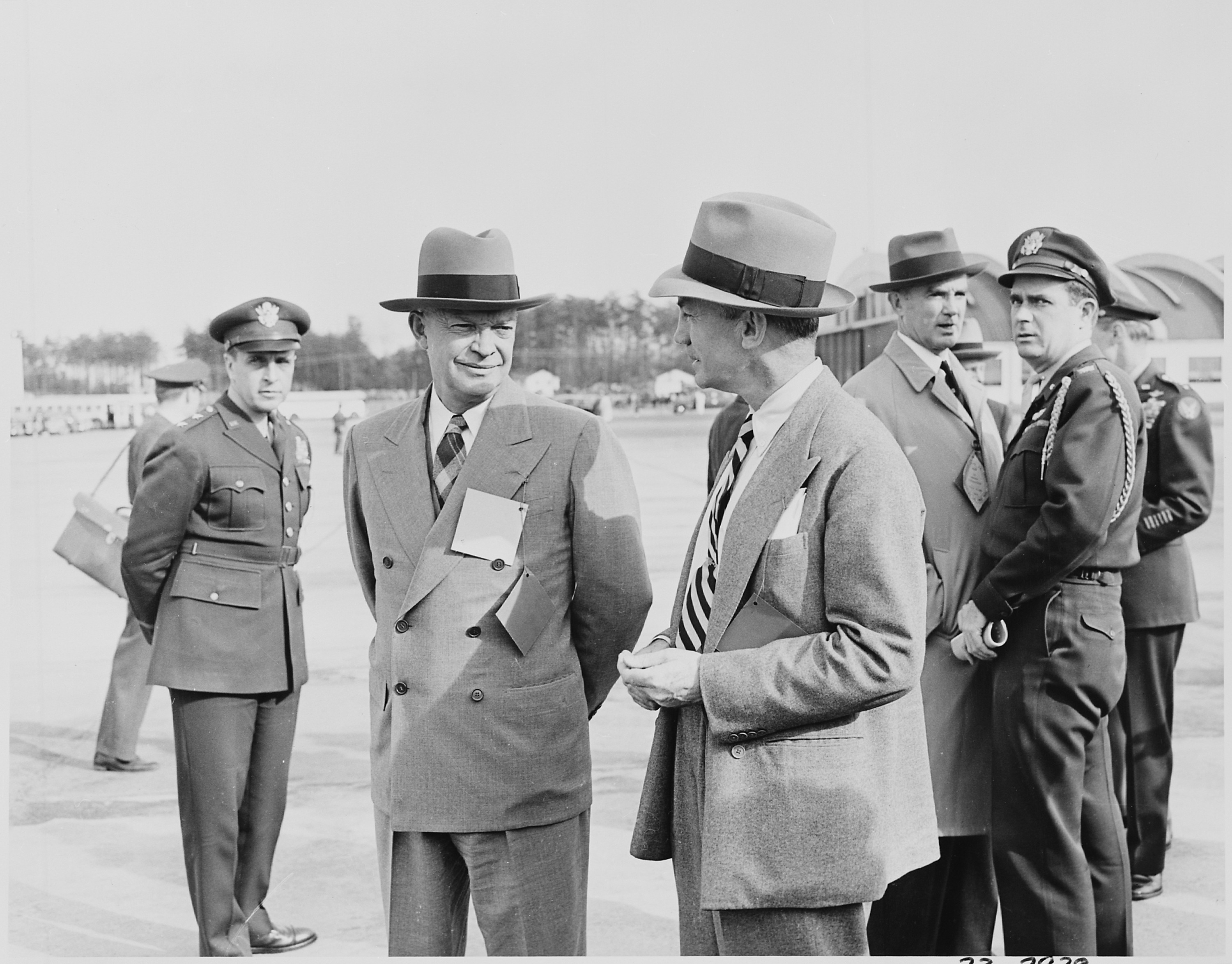
President of Columbia Dwight D. Eisenhower had the original idea for the institute.

The impetus for the institute's formation came from President of Columbia Dwight D. Eisenhower. The former general had written to a friend that he found it "almost incomprehensible that no American university has undertaken the continuous study of the causes, conduct and consequences of war." Eisenhower at first envisioned an endowed chair, or as he phrased it a "Chair for Peace", but the idea was then expanded into a full institute. In a March 1950 speech, Eisenhower said the purpose of the institute would be to "study war as a tragic social phenomenon – its origins, its conduct, its impact and particularly its disastrous consequences upon man's spiritual, intellectual, and material progress." Eisenhower was also instrumental in raising money for the new entity, making use of his fundraising prowess among his network of wealthy friends and acquaintances, in particular Edward J. Bermingham and Clarence Dillon. Eisenhower, who was taken with the idea enough to mention it in a 1950 letter to Winston Churchill, regarded the creation of the institute as his "unique contribution" to the university during this time as president, and when he stepped down from his position and gave a farewell speech to the university in January 1953, just days before being inaugurated as President of the United States, he listed the institute as one of his projects for which "my hopes are especially high."

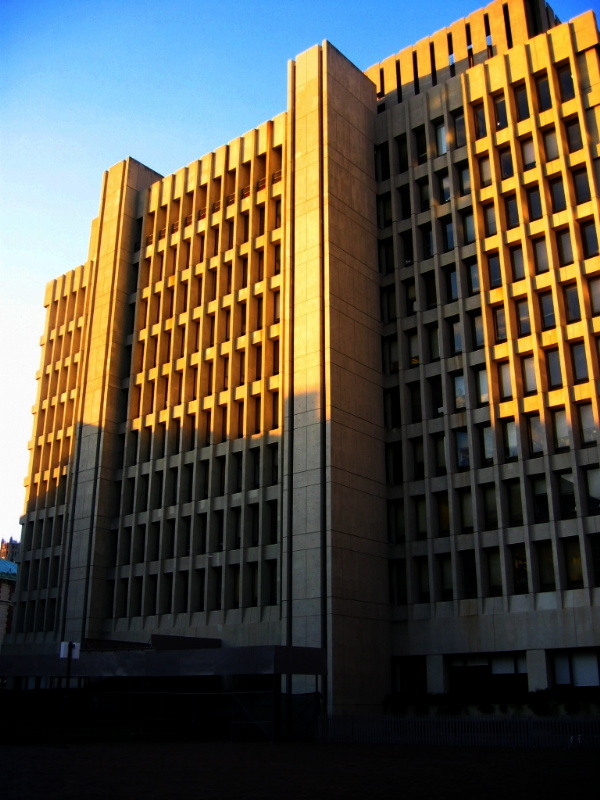
The Saltzman Institute of War and Peace Studies is located on the 13th floor of Columbia's International Affairs Building.

The creation of the institute was one of the first that took place in the aftermath of World War II to pursue international security studies, with the others that followed in that decade being the United States Army's research group in the mid-1950s that later became its Strategic Studies Institute, the programs in the 1950s that later became the Mershon Center for International Security Studies at the Ohio State University, the Department of War Studies at King's College London in the 1950s, and the International Institute for Strategic Studies in London in 1958.

The initial director of the Institute of War and Peaces Studies was Professor William T. R. Fox. (Eisenhower had originally asked George F. Kennan to take on the job but was rebuffed; Fox, reluctant to take on administrative work, had attempted to refuse too, but Eisenhower had simply said, "So glad you will accept the position.") Fox said the institute would reject simplistic explanations for the causes of war, and instead endeavor to understand war as "a method of protecting the values considered even more precious than the values it places in jeopardy." Early areas of focus for the institute were civil–military relations and the Cold War and nuclear strategy; these areas, and especially the first, were of particular interest to Fox. The subject areas did broaden over time. The burgeoning field of "peace research" was not one of them, however, nor was the institute dedicated to pacifism. Under the leadership of Fox, the institute became a viable operation; John A. Krout, dean of the graduate faculty and one of Eisenhower's allies in university administration, said after ten years had gone by that the institute had "done a great deal of fine work". One emphasis of the institute was in research, and by 1986 nearly 70 books had been published in connection with the institute.

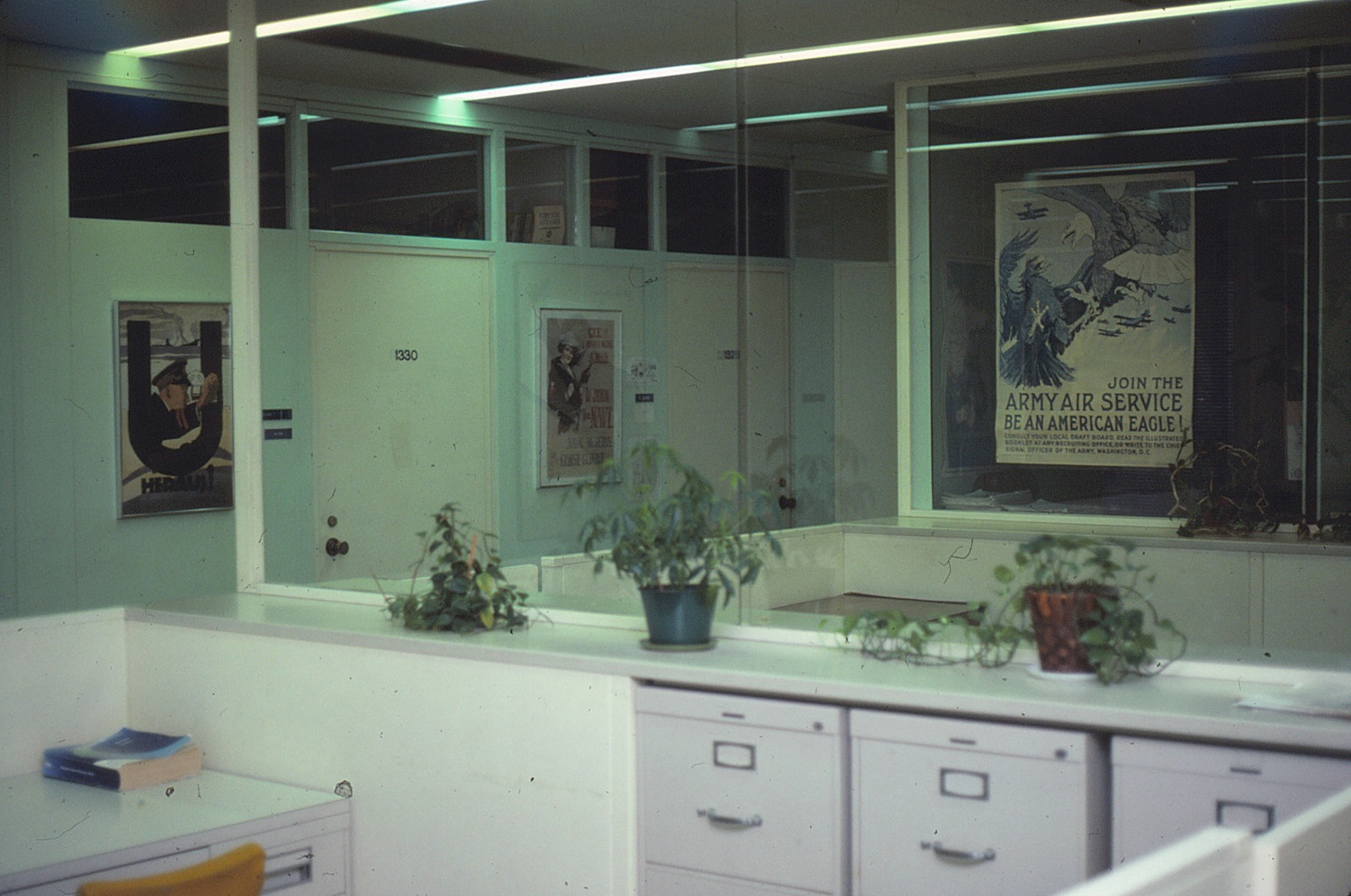
The central area of the Institute of War and Peace Studies, here seen in 1985, has featured an historical collection of war-recruitment and propaganda posters as part of its decor.

Fox would be director of the institute for 25 years. He was succeeded by Professor Warner R. Schilling, who held the position from 1976 to 1986. Schilling, who had previously served as associate director of the institute, was instrumental in protecting the institute's funding sources and physical space from encroachment by other parts of the university. Professor Howard Wriggins was acting director during 1986–1987. Professor David A. Baldwin then served as director from 1987 to 1994, followed by Professor Jack Snyder from 1994 to 1997. The next director, who held the position for over two decades, was Professor Richard K. Betts, beginning in 1997. In 2020 Professor Keren Yarhi-Milo was named the first woman to lead the institute. After Yarhi-Milo's promotion to Dean of the School of International and Public Affairs, Professor Peter Clement served as interim director from 2022 to 2023, after which Professor Page Fortna was named as director in 2023. In July 2026, political scientist Stacie E. Goddard became director of the institute, succeeding Elizabeth N. Saunders.

Besides the directors, prominent scholars associated with the institute have included Samuel P. Huntington (who was associate director of the institute from 1959 to 1962), Glenn Snyder, Roger Hilsman, Annette Baker Fox, Kenneth Waltz, Robert Jervis, Severine Autesserre, Kim Marten, and Stephen Biddle. The institute also helped foster the careers of several members who went on to high positions in government, including Michael Armacost, Joan E. Spero, Lynn E. Davis, Jean-Marie Guehenno, and Catherine McArdle Kelleher. In terms of physical location of the institute, it started in brownstones on 117th Street, then during the 1960s moved twice on a temporary basis before settling into the new International Affairs Building on 118th Street in 1970.

In 2003, the institute was renamed in honor of Arnold A. Saltzman, an industrialist and diplomat who graduated from Columbia College in 1936. Administratively, the institute remained within the School of International and Public Affairs. Two endowed chairs under the Saltzman name were also added at that time. Saltzman said, "No bugles blow for peace – and peace is not simply the absence of war. There is no mechanism in our government to wage peace, to look beyond immediate crises and plan for a peaceful future. This Institute can help move us in that direction."

== Programs ==
The Institute of War and Peace Studies has never had a teaching program of its own; rather, instruction is carried out through the university's Department of Political Science and the School of International and Public Affairs. The goal has been that members would engage in research, which would inform their teaching in other university departments and schools, and that teaching would likewise benefit the research in return. The institute would become the only non-area-specializing one within the School of International Affairs (later the School of International and Public Affairs).

Active programs at the institute during the 2010s and beyond have included the annual Saltzman Forum, the annual Summer Workshop on the Analysis of Military Operations and Strategy, the International Security Policy Concentration of the School of International and Public Affairs, the Saltzman Working Paper Series, the International Relations Faculty Seminar led by Professor Robert Jervis, the Comparative Defense Studies Program, the Center for International Conflict Resolution, and the Columbia Defense and Security Program. Following the passing of Jervis in 2021, the seminar was renamed the University Seminar in International Relations and Contemporary Foreign Policy.
