= Aldo Civico =

Aldo Civico was an assistant professor of anthropology at Rutgers University and director of International Institute for Peace. He was director of the Center for International Conflict Resolution at Columbia University.
