= James Goldgeier =

American political scientist

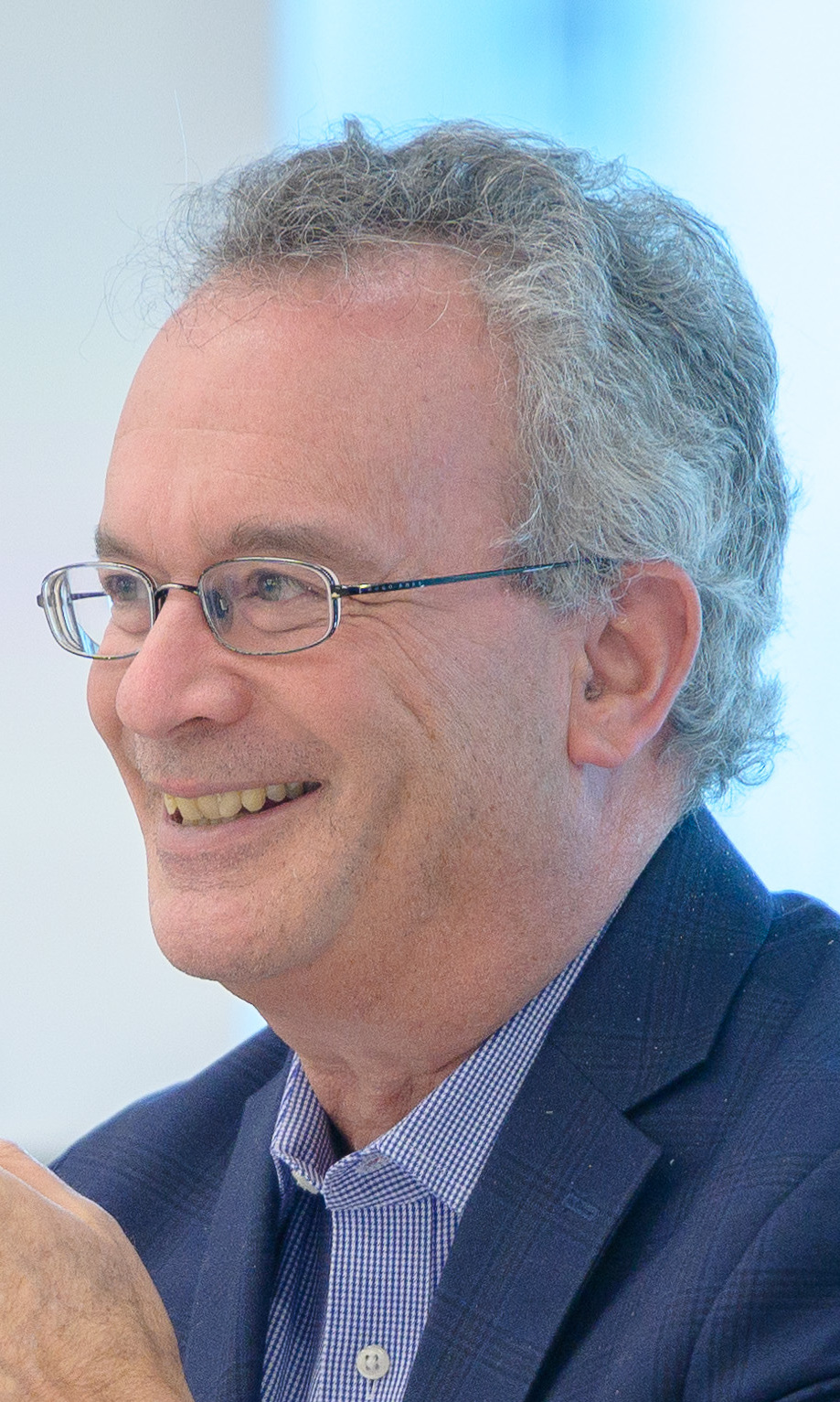
- Goldgeier in January 2020

Academic background
- Education: Harvard University (AB); University of California, Berkeley (MA and PhD)

Academic work
- Discipline: International relations
- Sub-discipline: Foreign relations of NATO, Russia–United States relations, Foreign relations of the United States
- Institutions: American University; George Washington University; Cornell University
- Website: Official website

James M. Goldgeier is a professor of international relations at the School of International Service at American University in Washington, D.C., where he served as dean from 2011 to 2017.

He was previously a professor of political science and international affairs at George Washington University in Washington, D.C. from 2004 to 2011, an associate professor of political science and international affairs from 1998 to 2004, and assistant professor of political science and international affairs from 1994 to 1998. While at George Washington University, he served as director of the Institute for European, Russian and Eurasian Studies from 2001 to 2005 and was its acting director from 1999 to 2000. Before joining George Washington University, Goldgeier taught at Cornell University from 1991 to 1993.

== Early life and education ==
Goldgeier BA in government at Harvard University in 1983 and his MA in political science from the University of California, Berkeley and PhD from Berkeley in 1985 and 1990, respectively.

== Career ==
=== Appointments ===
Goldgeier is a Robert Bosch Senior Visiting Fellow at the Center on the United States and Europe at the Brookings Institution. a Washington, D.C. think tank. From 2017 to 2019, he was a visiting senior fellow at the Council on Foreign Relations and the 2018–19 Library of Congress U.S.-Russia Chair at the John W. Kluge Center.

Prior to joining American University, Goldgeier served as Transatlantic Academy Fellow at the German Marshall Fund of the United States (2010–2011); Whitney H. Shepardson Senior Fellow for Transatlantic Relations at the Council on Foreign Relations (2007–2010); W. Glenn Campbell and Rita Ricardo-Campbell National Fellow and the Edward Teller National Fellow at the Hoover Institution (2008–2009); a Public Policy Scholar at the Woodrow Wilson International Center for Scholars (2007); Whitney H. Shepardson Fellow at the Council on Foreign Relations (2006–2007); a Policy Research Scholar, at George Washington Institute of Public Policy (2005–2007); the Henry Alfred Kissinger Chair in Foreign Policy and International Relations at the Library of Congress (2005- 2006); Adjunct Senior Fellow at the Council on Foreign Relations (2002–2006); Nonresident Senior Fellow at The Brookings Institution (1999–2001); a visiting fellow at The Brookings Institution (1998–1999); a Council on Foreign Relations International Affairs Fellow at the State Department and National Security Council (1995–1996); a Visiting Pre-doctoral and Post-doctoral Fellow, Center for International Security and Arms Control, Stanford University (1989–1990); and a Dissertation Fellow at the UC Institute on Global Conflict and Cooperation, (1987–1988).

Goldgeier serves as a co-principal investigator of the Bridging the Gap initiative, a multi-year project named in honor of Alexander George, whose 1993 book of this title encouraged scholars to pursue policy-relevant research. Likewise, the Bridging the Gap initiative, which is housed at the School of International Service, supports professional development programs and other activities to encourage scholars of political science and international relations to produce research that is relevant to policymakers.

== Publications ==
=== Books ===
Goldgeier is co-author of America Between the Wars: From 11-9 to 9-11 (Public Affairs 2008) with current assistant secretary of defense for international security affairs Derek Chollet, which was named a "Best Book of 2008" by Slate and a "2008 Favorite Book" by The Daily Beast.

In addition, Goldgeier is co-author of Power and Purpose: U.S. Policy toward Russia after the Cold War (Brookings Institution, 2003) with former U.S. Ambassador to Russia Michael McFaul, for which he won the 2003 Lepgold Book Prize in international relations from Georgetown University.

He is also author of Not Whether But When: The U.S. Decision to Enlarge NATO (Brookings Institution, 1999). Goldgeier is also author of "The Future of NATO," a Council on Foreign Relations Special Report (2010), and Leadership Style and Soviet Foreign Policy: Stalin, Khrushchev, Brezhnev, Gorbachev (The Johns Hopkins University Press 1994), for which he received the Edgar S. Furniss Book Award in National and International Security. Goldgeier also authored Foreign Policy Careers for PhDs: A Practical Guide to a World of Possibilities alongside Tamara Cofman Wittes in 2023.

=== Articles ===
- The Imperial Presidency Unleashed, Foreign Affairs, July 18, 2024 (co-authored with Sarah Binder and Elizabeth N. Saunders)
