= Elizabeth N. Saunders =

American political scientist

- Education: Harvard College (AB), University of Cambridge (MPhil), Yale University (PhD)
- Occupation: Political scientist
- Employer: Columbia University
- Website: https://profsaunders.com

Elizabeth N. Saunders is an American political scientist. She is a professor of political science at Columbia University, a non-resident senior fellow at the Brookings Institution, and an editor of The Washington Post's Monkey Cage blog. She is known for her research examining the domestic politics of U.S. foreign policy and the foreign policy behavior of leaders.

== Education ==
Saunders holds a AB in physics and astronomy and astrophysics from Harvard College, a MPhil in international relations from the University of Cambridge, and a PhD in political science from Yale University.

== Career ==
Prior to joining Columbia, Saunders was an associate professor at Georgetown University's School of Foreign Service.

== Publications ==
=== Books ===
- The Insiders’ Game: How Elites Make War and Peace, Princeton University Press, March 26, 2024
- Leaders at War: How Presidents Shape Military Interventions, Cornell University Press, February 3, 2011

=== Articles ===
- "The Imperial Presidency Unleashed", Foreign Affairs, July 18, 2024 (co-authored with Sarah Binder and James Goldgeier)
- "Politics Can't Stop at the Water's Edge", Foreign Affairs, February 20, 2024
- "Leaders around the world made bold moves in 2022. They didn't always succeed." The Washington Post, December 30, 2022
