= Keren Yarhi-Milo =

Israeli-American political scientist

Academic background
- Education: Columbia University (BA); University of Pennsylvania (PhD)
- Influences: Robert Jervis

Academic work
- Discipline: Political science
- Institutions: Princeton University; Columbia University

Keren Yarhi-Milo is an Israeli and American political scientist and higher education academic administrator who serves as Dean of the School of International and Public Affairs (SIPA) and the Adlai E. Stevenson Professor of International Relations at Columbia University. Her research focuses on international security and foreign policy decision-making.

She is the co-founder of the Institute of Global Politics, established in 2023, and previously served as Director of Columbia's Arnold A. Saltzman Institute of War and Peace Studies.

== Early life and education ==
Yarhi-Milo earned a Bachelor of Arts in political science from Columbia University in 2003, summa cum laude, and then worked with several NGOs promoting peace in the Middle East.

She received her Ph.D. in political science from the University of Pennsylvania, graduating as a Dean's Scholar. She completed her postdoctoral research at Harvard University's Belfer Center for Science and International Affairs and a predoctoral fellow at the Olin Institute for Strategic Studies at Harvard University. She studied under political scientist Robert Jervis.

Her doctoral dissertation received the Kenneth Waltz Award for the best dissertation in the field of International Security and Arms Control in 2010. Her research in political science has also received awards from the Smith Richardson Foundation, Arthur Ross Foundation, and Abram Morris Foundation.

== Career ==
=== Princeton University ===
Yarhi-Milo began working at Princeton University in 2009 as an assistant professor of Politics and International Affairs at the Princeton School of International and Public Affairs. She later became an associate professor with tenure before joining Columbia University in 2019. During her tenure at Princeton, her research focused on international security and foreign policy decision-making.

=== Columbia University ===
At Columbia University, Yarhi-Milo served as Director of the Saltzman Institute of War and Peace Studies where she oversaw research initiatives and academic programming. She founded the Saltzman Student Scholar program, a selective program for undergraduate political science majors.

In the Fall of 2021, Yarhi-Milo co-launched the Emerging Voices in National Security and Intelligence program, which provides academic and professional exposure to careers in national security and intelligence.

In May 2022, Yarhi-Milo was appointed Dean of the School of International and Public Affairs (SIPA) at Columbia University. She is also on the Executive Committee and President's Cabinet of Columbia University.

=== Institute of Global Politics ===
In 2023, Yarhi-Milo co-founded and launched the Institute of Global Politics (IGP) at Columbia SIPA along with former Secretary of State Hillary Clinton. The institute, launched on October 3, 2023, serves as a nonpartisan platform that brings academics, political leaders, and policy makers together to address global policy challenges. Among its initiatives, the Institute of Global Politics has hosted the Across the Aisle series, which hosts public discussions featuring speakers with differing political perspectives on policy issues.

=== Teaching and public engagement ===
Yarhi-Milo has taught courses on intelligence and foreign policy, crisis diplomacy, and foreign policy deision-making. At SIPA, Yarhi-Milo co-teaches the course Inside the Situation Room with Secretary Clinton. The course, which is offered to Columbia undergraduates and SIPA students by application, discusses the psychological biases that influence crisis decision-making.

The course informed an edited volume, Inside the Situation Room: The Theory and Practice of Crisis Decision-Making, edited by Yarhi-Milo and Secretary Clinton. The volume was published by Oxford University Press in 2025. Yarhi-Milo and Secretary Clinton participated in public discussions of the book at academic and policy forums, including the Council on Foreign Relations.

Yarhi-Milo delivered the Michael W. Doyle Inaugural Lecture, entitled "Credibility Reversed: Coercive Diplomacy in an Age of Unpredictability," at the American Academy in Berlin in June 2026.

Yarhi-Milo is also a member of the Council on Foreign Relations (CFR).

=== Awards and honors ===
In 2010, Yarhi-Milo's doctoral dissertation won the Kenneth Waltz Award for the best dissertation in the field of International Security and Arms Control.

Her 2014 book, Knowing The Adversary: Leaders, Intelligence Organizations, and Assessments of Intentions in International Relations, received the 2016 Edgar S. Furniss Book Award. She was also a co-winner of the 2016 DPLST Book Prize, Diplomatic Studies Section of the International Studies Association (ISA).

Her 2018 book, Who Fights for Reputation? The Psychology of Leaders in International Conflict earned the Best Book Award on Foreign Policy from the American Political Science Association in 2019. It also won the Biennial Best Foreign Policy Book Award from the International Studies Association in 2021.

In 2022, Yarhi-Milo won the Emerging Scholar Award from the International Studies Association (ISA), an annual award that recognizes "early- to mid-career scholars who have made an unusually significant contribution to the field of security studies."

In 2023, Yarhi-Milo was named the Adlai E. Stevenson Professor of International Relations, a chair formerly held by Robert Jervis.

In June 2026, Yarhi-Milo received an honorary Doctor of the University degree from Queen’s University Belfast for distinction in international and public affairs.

=== Scholarship and written works ===
Yarhi-Milo's research and teaching focus on international security, intelligence, and foreign policy decision-making. Her work has contributed to the development of the selective attention framework in the study of international decision-making.

Yarhi-Milo has written and co-authored articles and essays for public outlets, including The Atlantic, The New York Times, Foreign Affairs, and The Washington Post. Her research has also been published in academic journals, including International Organization and International Security.

She also serves on the editorial advisory board of Political Science Quarterly (PSQ) and is a series editor for Princeton Studies in International History and Politics.

Yarhi-Milo has also published three books.

- Knowing The Adversary: Leaders, Intelligence Organizations, and Assessments of Intentions in International Relations (2014)
- Who Fights for Reputation? The Psychology of Leaders in International Conflict (2018)
- Inside the Situation Room: The Theory and Practice of Crisis Decision-Making (2025, co-edited)
