= Military History for the Modern Strategist =

2023 book

- Author: Michael E. O'Hanlon
- Language: English
- Subject: Military history
- Genre: Nonfiction
- Publisher: Brookings Institution Press
- Publication date: 2023
- Publication place: United States of America
- Pages: 448
- ISBN: 9780815739838

Military History for the Modern Strategist: America's Major Wars Since 1861 is a nonfiction military history book by Michael E. O'Hanlon. It was published by Brookings Institution Press in 2023. The book analyzes every one of the United States of America's major wars, from the American Civil War to the conflicts in the Middle East.

== Structure ==
The book is separated into six chapters. The first five each deal with a different era of American warfare: Chapter 1 (The American Civil War), Chapter 2 (World War I), Chapter 3 (World War II), Chapter 4 (The Korean War and Vietnam War), and Chapter 5 (Middle Eastern wars after 1990, including the Iraq War and War in Afghanistan). The sixth chapter concludes the book by summarizing the key takeaways from the analyses presented in previous chapters.

Over the course of the book, O'Hanlon observes that wars tend to be more costly and difficult than expected, and that its ultimate outcome is rarely apparent at the outset. O'Hanlon attributes the United States' track record of losses and costly engagement with modern wars to these factors. However, he observes that the grand military strategy of the United States has been more successful than any other nation in history. This success has rendered modern setbacks inconsequential. He credits this success to the United States' resource-rich, continent-spanning infrastructure as well as its society, which is democratic, flexible and places a high value on research and development.

== Reception ==
The book received positive reviews. Amos C. Fox praised the book's focus on concise, qualitative analyses of case studies in a review for The Journal of Strategic Security. Fox wrote that "readability and O’Hanlon’s ability to reduce complex ideas into manageable bits of information" made it stand out. Fletcher M. Burton of American Diplomacy praised the book's breadth and insightful analysis of American military doctrine.

Lieutenant Commander Michael Axel praised the book in a review for the United States Naval Institute, recommending it as a foundational text on U.S. military history. Wm. Shane Story of Army History wrote that the book was accessible to general audiences while still being useful for subject matter experts.
