= Demetrios James Caraley =

American political scientist

Demetrios "Jim" Caraley (June 22, 1932 – December 14, 2020) was editor of Political Science Quarterly and President Emeritus of The Academy of Political Science. Before retiring in 2004, he was Janet Robb Professor of the Social Science at Barnard College and Professor of International and Public Affairs at Columbia University.

== Biography ==
Caraley was born in New York City in 1932 and graduated from Brooklyn Technical High School. He earned his B.A. from Columbia College summa cum laude in 1954 and a Ph.D. and M.Phil from Columbia University. While a student at Columbia Law School, he was elected to Law Review. He married Vilma Mairo Bornemann 1988. He has three children, James Christopher Caraley (d.), David Andrew Caraley (d.), and Anne Leslie Caraley from a previous marriage. Demetrios Caraley died on December 14, 2020, aged 88.

== Career and Research ==
Caraley was a founding director of Columbia University's Graduate Program in Public Policy and served as Chairman of the Barnard College Department of Political Science for thirty years. He has been Editor of the Political Science Quarterly for more than thirty-five years, a position he held until his death.

He has published numerous books and articles on various aspects of American politics including city government, congressional policies toward cities, national security policy, as well as democratic political theory and ethics. In the field of national security policy, his publications include September 11, Terrorist Attacks, and U.S. Foreign Policy, The President's War Powers and The Politics of Military Unification, and The New American Interventionism. Caraley's other field of interest is "Democratic Political Theory and Ethics," in which he wrote an article "Elections and Dilemmas of American Democratic Governance," that was reprinted in Promise and Problems of Old and New Democracies, edited by Xiaobo Lü (2000). The New York Academy of Public Administration selected Caraley's article "Ending Welfare As We Know It: A Reform Still in Progress” as the "outstanding" article published in 2001.

Caraley served as a naval officer during the Korean War.

== Selected publications ==
- 'The Politics of Military Unification (1965)
- Governing the City (1969, with R. H. Connery)
- Doing More With Less: Cutback Management in New York City (1982)
- September 11, Terrorist Attacks, and U.S. Foreign Policy (2002)
- American Hegemony: Preventive War, Iraq, and Imposing Democracy (2004)
- EIGHT PRESIDENTIAL ELECTIONS, 1980–2008: Dealignments, Brittle Mandates, and Possible Majority Realignment (2008)

== Major Articles ==
- "Washington Abandons the Cities"
- "Dismantling the Federal Safety Net: Fictions versus Realities"
- "Complications of American Democracy: Elections Are Not Enough"
- “Three Trends Over Eight Presidential Elections, 1980–2008: Toward the Emergence of a Democratic Majority Realignment?”

== Academic Focus ==
- Urban policy-making and government
- Congress
- Democratic political theory
- Policy analysis
- National security

== Awards and honors ==
- Grants from Committee on Research in the Social Sciences, The Urban Center, The Ford Foundation, H.E.W., the Exxon Education Foundation, the Department of Education, the Russell Sage Foundation
- Harlan Fiske Scholar and elected to Columbia Law Review (Law School)
- Phi Beta Kappa (junior year)
