= Warner R. Schilling =

American political scientist

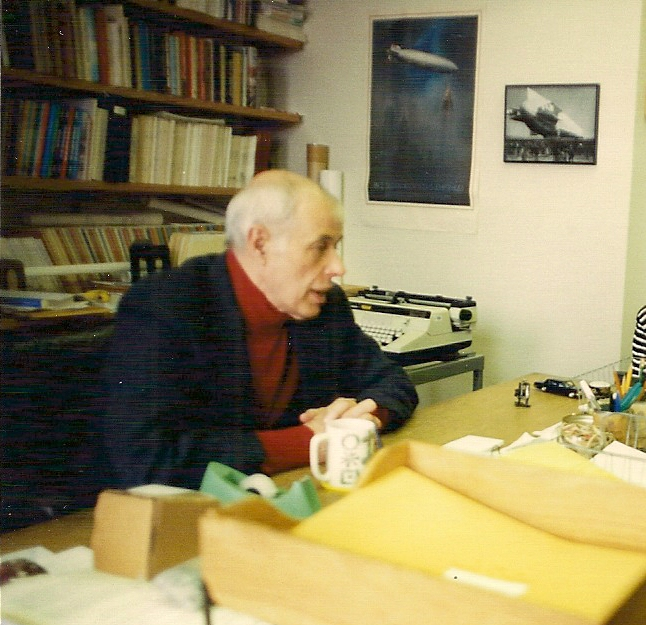
Schilling in his office in 1995

Warner Roller Schilling (May 23, 1925 – October 20, 2013) was an American political scientist and international relations scholar at Columbia University (1954–1957, 1958–1996, emeritus 1997–2013), where he was the James T. Shotwell Professor of International Relations. He was director of the university's Institute of War and Peace Studies from 1976 to 1986.

== Biography ==
Schilling was born in Glendale, California, but grew up in Greater St. Louis. He served as a radio operator with the United States Army Air Forces from 1943 to 1946. He received his bachelor's, master's, and Ph.D. degrees from Yale University in 1949, 1951, and 1954, respectively. As an undergraduate at Yale he belonged to Saybrook College, was a member of Phi Beta Kappa and the Yale Political Union, and was pictorial editor for Yale Scientific Magazine. He was part of an era of students motivated to study international relations following World War II because, as he later said, "We thought that by studying international politics and foreign policy we might have a part in moving the world in happier directions."

He was a research fellow at the Center of International Studies at Princeton University during 1953–54, a lecturer and research associate at Columbia University from 1954–57, and an assistant professor of international relations at the Massachusetts Institute of Technology during 1957–58, before coming to Columbia for good in 1958.

He married the former Jane Pierce Metzger in 1951 (she had been a teacher of economics who co-authored the 1954 book The Impact of Strikes and would later serve as editor for some of the Institute of War and Peace Studies' published works). The couple raised two sons and lived in Leonia, New Jersey, a town where a number of other Columbia professors lived. He sometimes engaged in academic-oriented presentations and debates in Leonia itself and in surrounding Bergen County.

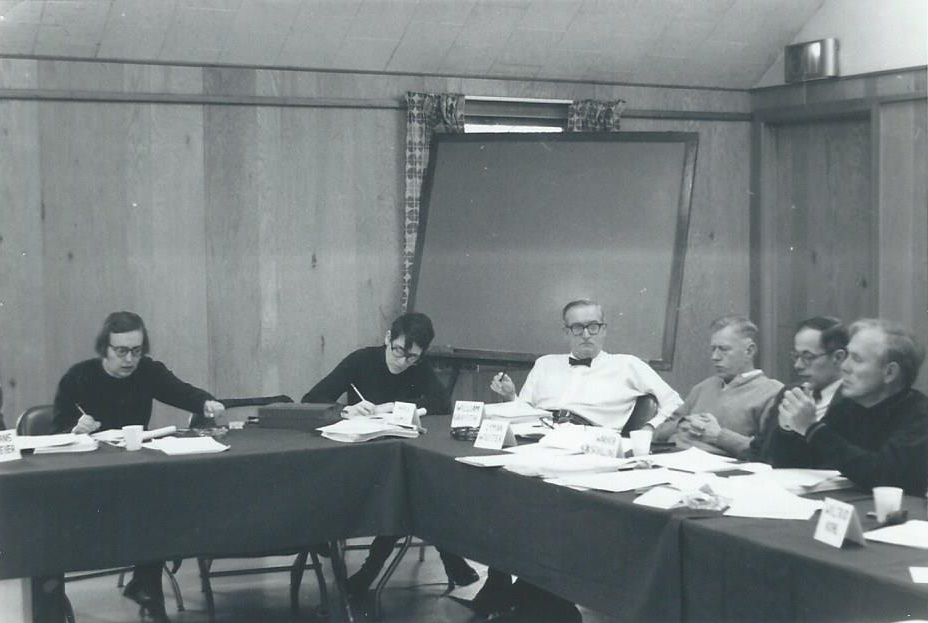
Schilling (second from right) at a 1969 conference for the United States Arms Control and Disarmament Agency; his wife Jane P. M. Schilling was also present (far left)

Schilling was the co-author of the book Strategy, Politics and Defense Budgets (1962) along with Paul Y. Hammond and Glenn H. Snyder. Writing for the journal Defense Analysis in 1989, Michael D. Yaffe wrote that 25 years later the three authors' "insights about defense planning still ring true" and that the book was a landmark of defense-policy literature. Schilling's portion, The Politics of National Defense: Fiscal 1950, was an examination of the process by which the U.S. defense budget was arrived at during a time of fundamental change for U.S. security policy and an analysis of the forces at play that made rational choice so difficult. An influential work, two decades later, John Lewis Gaddis commented that it was still the "classic discussion" of defense spending during that period. Robert J. Art has labeled Schilling, along with contemporaries Richard Neustadt, Roger Hilsman, and Samuel Huntington, as part of the "first wave" of scholars of foreign policy making.

He was also co-author of American Arms and a Changing Europe: Dilemmas of Deterrence and Disarmament (1973) and co-editor of European Security and the Atlantic System (1973). In addition, he published a number of scholarly articles. One of those was regarding the decision by the President Harry S. Truman and the U.S. government to proceed with development of the hydrogen bomb in 1950; in the mid-1950s Schilling interviewed virtually every participant in that decision, and gave public lectures on the subject, but a book-length treatment of the decision did not incorporate these interviews until after his death. He was recipient of one of the Guggenheim Fellowships awarded in 1964.

At Columbia, he became a full professor in 1967. He served on a faculty committee investigating university recruiting policies. At one point in 1967, he was mentioned in the Columbia Daily Spectator as a possible candidate under consideration to become Dean of Columbia College

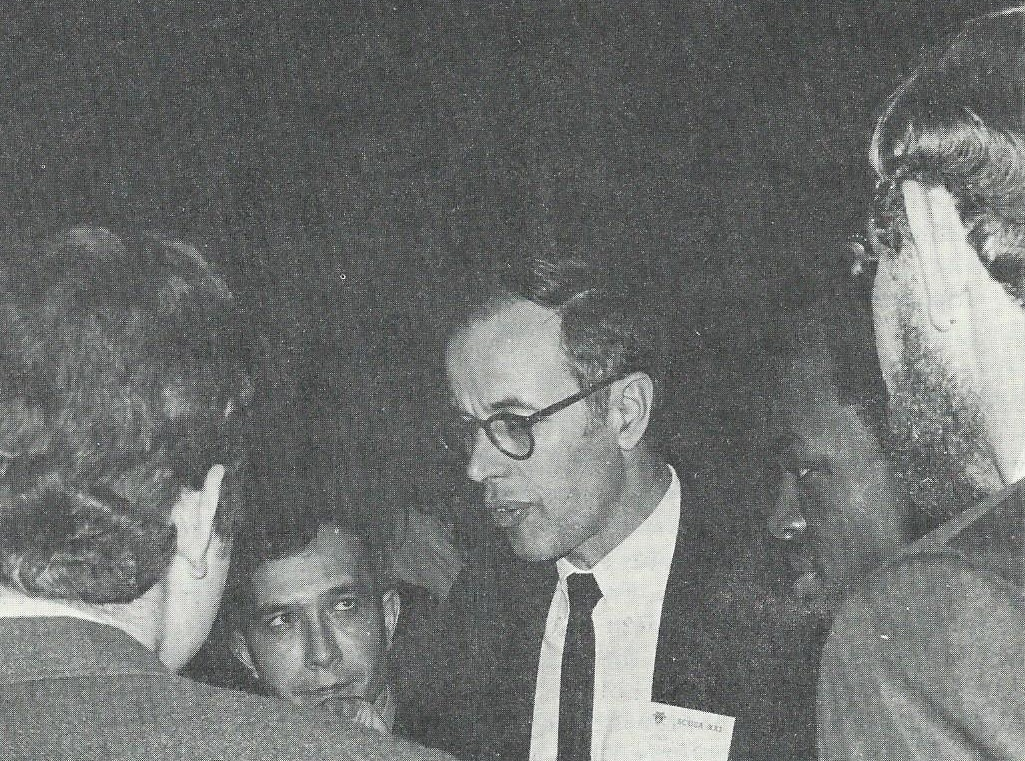
Schilling with students during a 1969 conference at the United States Military Academy at West Point

During the Columbia University protests of 1968 that split the faculty and campus, Schilling was considered one of the more vocal of the conservative faculty members, opposing the demonstrators and their spokesperson Mark Rudd and supporting the position of the university administration. (Off campus, the politics of any of these "conservatives" was often anything but, and they were uncomfortable with such labels when their goal as they saw it was simply the restoration of order in American and European academies.) Shortly after midnight at the start of April 25, 1968, the third day of student protests and occupations, Schilling was part of a faculty delegation unsympathetic to the protesters that entered the occupied portion of Low Library to attempt a dialogue with them; it went nowhere. That evening, he spoke to a large gathering of like-minded students and faculty at Wollman Auditorium and gained applause after proclaiming, "if Mark Rudd is still at Columbia in the fall, I will not be." On the evening of April 26, he was part of a press conference in which several faculty members endorsed a moderate student group called the Majority Coalition that wanted to prevent the granting of amnesty to the occupying students; Schilling said he had "high admiration for [the] conduct" of the counter-demonstrators. He was one of several professors to propose that the faculty themselves cordon off Low Library to prevent free entry and exit of the demonstrators and seize the university identification cards of those leaving. On April 28, he was part of a line of faculty formed outside Low Library that sought to prevent violence among students. He supported the administration's April 30 decision to bring in the police to clear the buildings, saying it was "a horrible decision to make [but] the right one". Schilling subsequently faulted colleague Alan Westin, leader of a faculty group more sympathetic to the demonstrators, and others in that group, for engaging in behavior that turned what he thought would have been a manageable student-administration conflict into "a disaster".

In 1973, Schilling was named the James T. Shotwell Professor of International Relations.

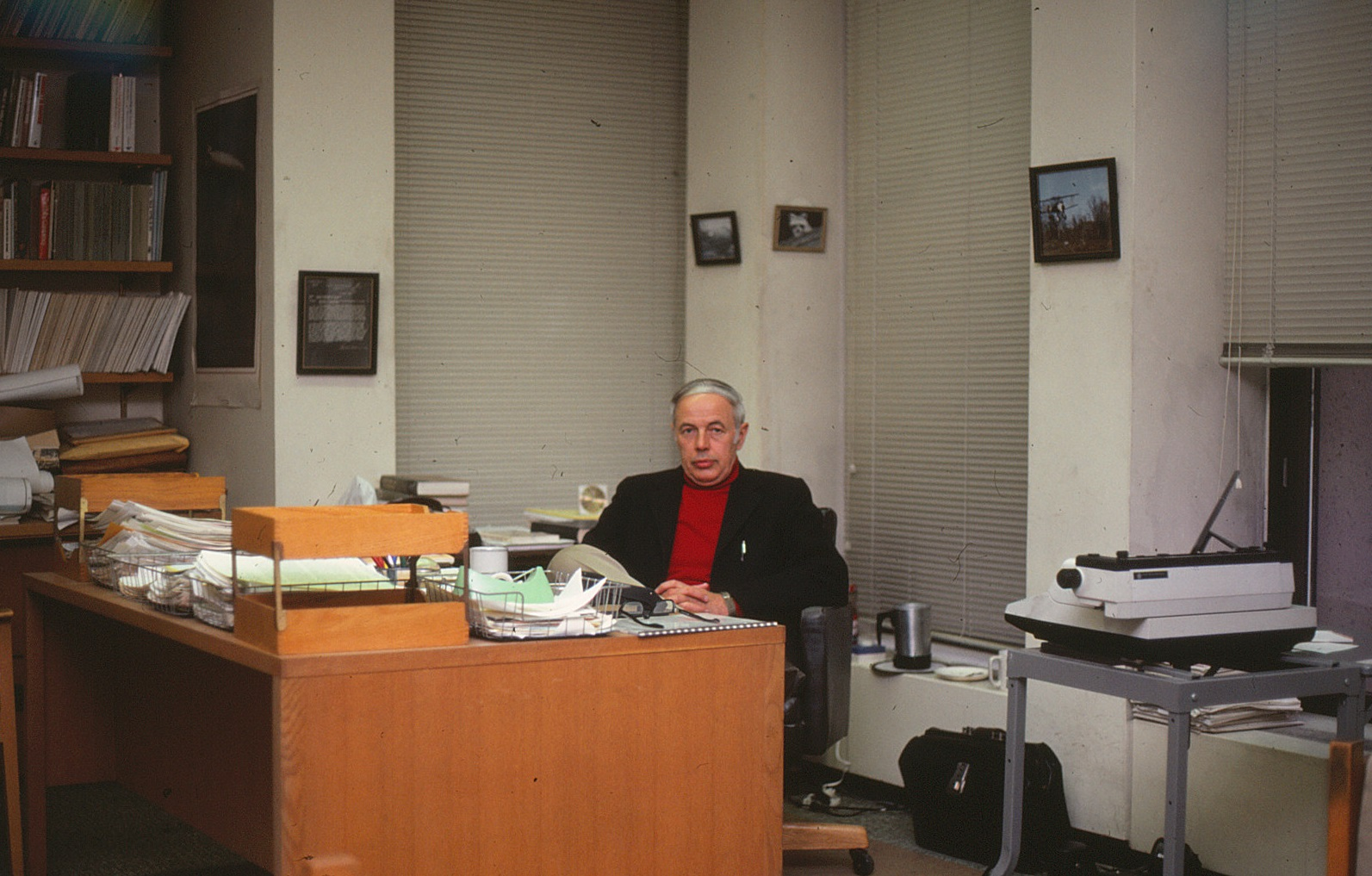
Schilling as director of the Institute of War and Peace Studies in 1985

He served as director of the university's Institute of War and Peace Studies from 1976 to 1986, taking over from Professor William T. R. Fox, who had founded the institute twenty-five years earlier. Schilling had previous served as associate director of the institute beginning in 1968. (Schilling was one of those influenced by Fox, having been his student back at Yale.) As director, Schilling endeavored to keep the institute's funding sources and physical space from being encroached upon by other parts of the university.

Schilling also lectured at the National War College, West Point, the Army War College, the Army Command and General Staff College, the Air Force Academy, the Foreign Service Institute in the U.S., the Imperial Defence College and the Royal Naval College in the UK. His appearance in Japan in 1969 to discuss the impact of MIRV warheads on the strategic nuclear balance was covered in the Yomiuri Shimbun. He also served as a consultant for the U.S. Department of State and Department of Defense, as well as for the U.S. Senate's Subcommittee on National Policy Machinery. He was a resident fellow at The Bellagio Center in 1975. He was a member of the International Institute for Strategic Studies and the Council on Foreign Relations. At Columbia, he was associate director for the Council for Atomic Age Studies.

Schilling made a number of media appearances, including on Edward R. Murrow's Hidden Revolution radio series in 1959, where he described the effects of a surprise Soviet nuclear attack on the United States; on National Educational Television's debate-style Court of Reason in 1963, to discuss Western alliance policy regarding nuclear weapons; appearances on the nationally distributed Columbia Lectures in International Studies, for instance in 1964 to talk about "The Likelihood of Limited War"; on New York local television station news and public affairs programs to discuss international events; and on the CBS Morning News in 1982 to discuss the ongoing Falklands War. He was quoted in newspapers over several decades, often emphasizing the need to appreciate a broad sweep of history to understand current developments. A 1986 front-page story in the Portland Press Herald displayed his quote, "Statesmen very rarely decide to have a war – they usually decide to risk a war," meaning that miscalculations in those risk assessments sometimes result in wars taking place that they never would have chosen.

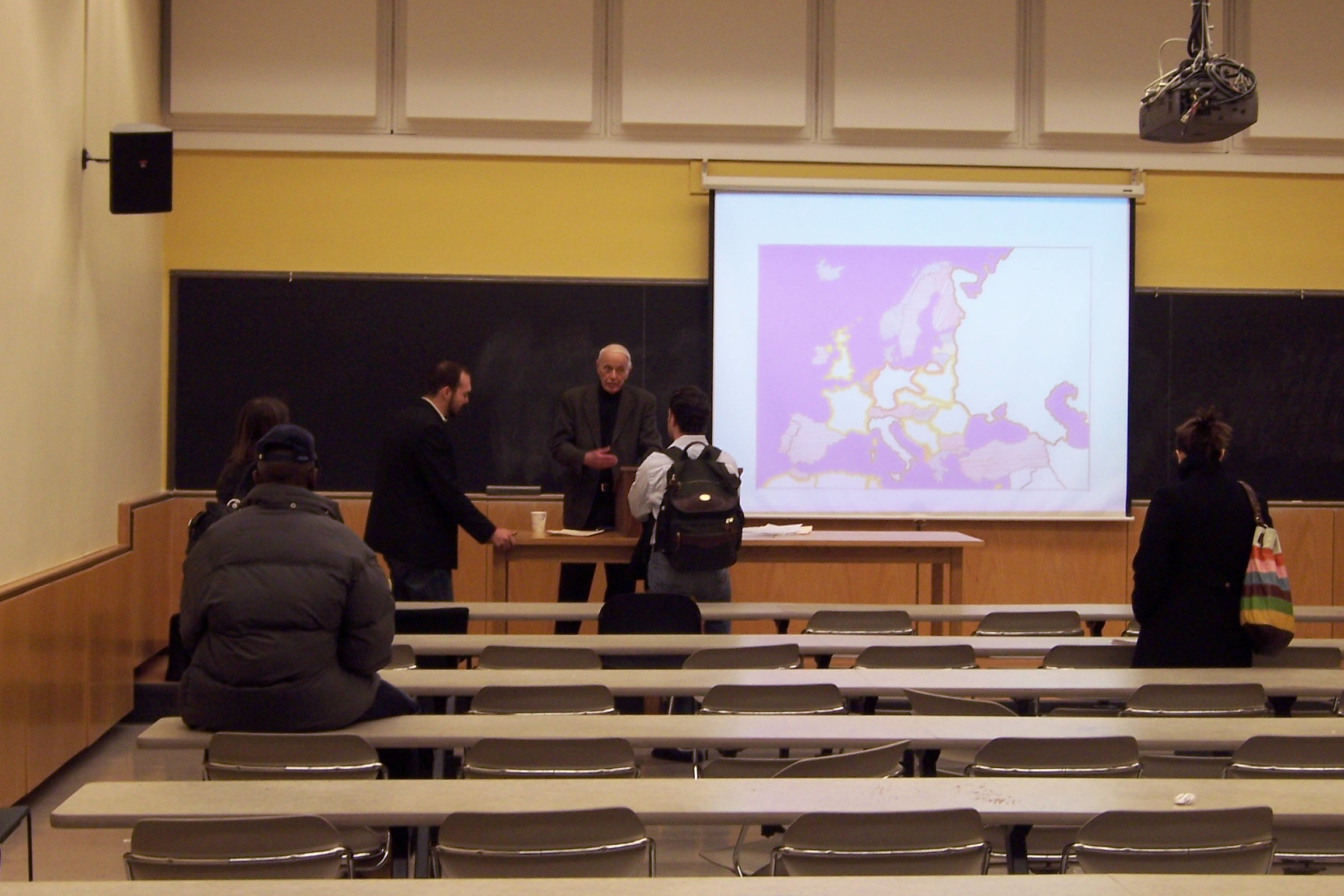
Schilling talking to students after one of his "Weapons, Strategy, and War" classes in 2008

Schilling was known for his teaching, which included courses such as "American Strategies in World Politics", "Causes of War", and "Weapons, Strategy, and War". The last of these was a popular course that, according to the university, "became legendary among undergraduates and graduate students", and which he was still teaching well into his eighties. Each year, while observed by a university security officer, he brought an unloaded, World War I-era rifle to class to allow students to physically imagine what using it in battle would be like. A panel session at the International Studies Association 2009 annual conference in New York commemorated his teaching and mentoring contributions in the field of security studies. As Stacie E. Goddard, one of the organizers of the session, said, "We all felt it was important to recognize the influence Warner has had on our teaching."

In a 2003 profile by The Christian Science Monitor, Schilling said that students were more oriented towards academic careers than they had been in years past, but were less knowledgeable about history and geography and less personally vulnerable to decisions about war and peace. On the importance of studying history, he said, "There are a whole host of questions that, even if you are only interested in the here and now, can best be answered by looking backward. It requires a greater leap of faith than I am willing to undertake to think that people are brighter in the year 2003 than they were in 1903 or 1803 or 1703. There are some things which have changed, but I don't think there have been any major new innovations in human intelligence or human emotions. If you are interested in the human animal and how the human animal behaves in different circumstances, a study of past behavior, or in this case, history, is one very useful way of building up your working capital, insight, and knowledge."

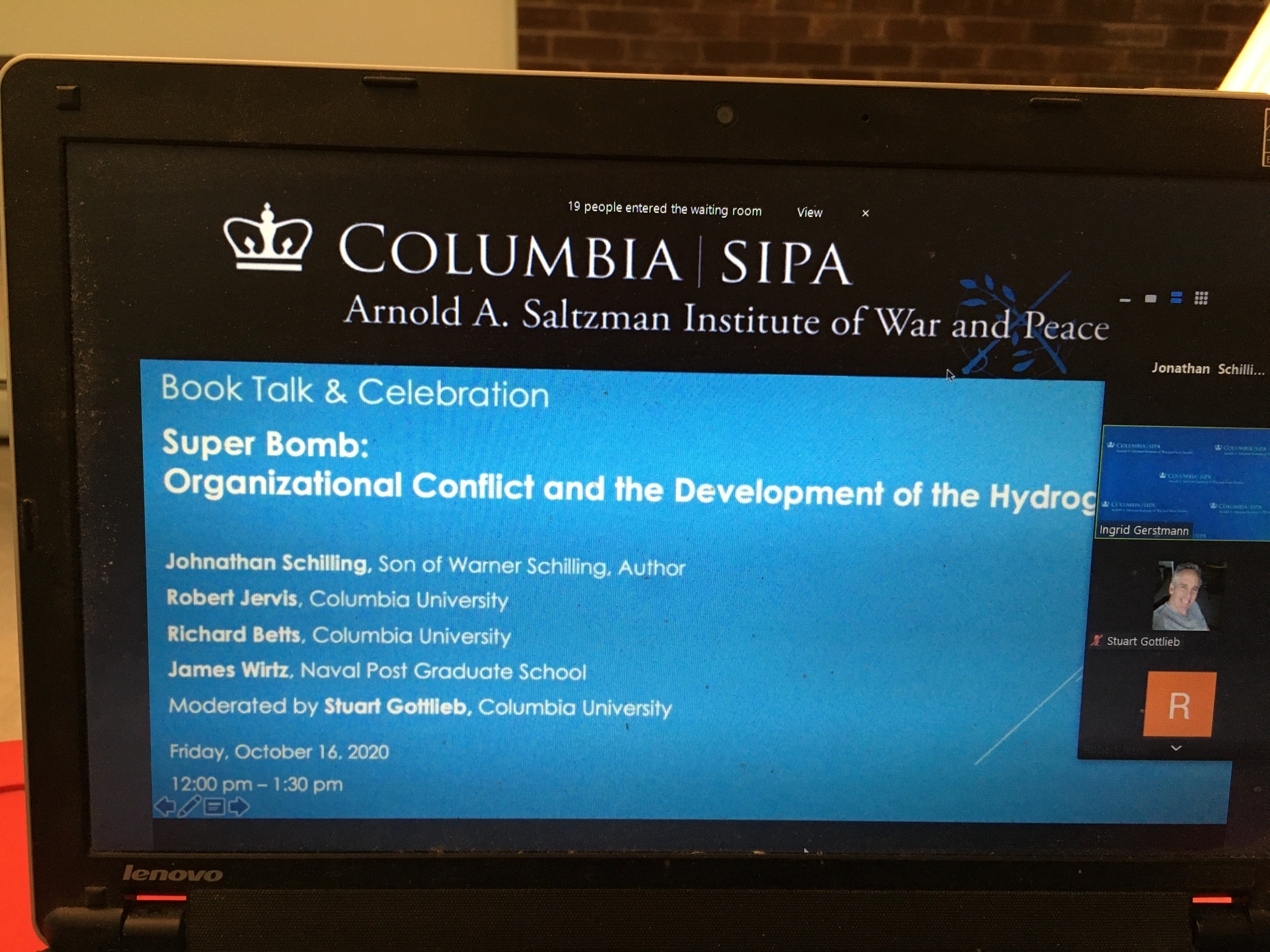
Virtual book talk for Super Bomb at Columbia University's Arnold A. Saltzman Institute of War and Peace Studies, 2020

He died in Englewood, New Jersey, on October 20, 2013, at age 88.

Schilling was a perfectionist who had trouble finishing writing projects during his lifetime. After his death, unfinished works of his – regarding assassination as an instrument of foreign policy, and his interviews and conclusions regarding the aforementioned H-bomb decision – were published in collaboration with other authors and scholars. The latter project took the form of the book Super Bomb: Organizational Conflict and the Development of the Hydrogen Bomb and was written by British academic Ken Young. A review in Foreign Affairs characterized the result as "a compelling book" that presented "a fresh look at the defeat" of those opposing the weapon, a review for the Association of College and Research Libraries found value in the "illuminating contemporaneous interviews" that Schilling had conducted, and a review in Perspectives on Politics pointed to the "sixty years of gestation" back story behind the book as "highlight[ing] why it constitutes a unique contribution to the historical literature and to our understanding of bureaucratic politics".

== Publications ==
Books

- Strategy, Politics and Defense Budgets (Columbia University Press, 1962) [co-author with Paul Y. Hammond and Glenn H. Snyder]
- American Arms and a Changing Europe: Dilemmas of Deterrence and Disarmament (Columbia University Press, 1973) [co-author with William T. R. Fox, Catherine M. Kelleher, and Donald J. Puchala]
- European Security and the Atlantic System (Columbia University Press, 1973) [co-editor with William T. R. Fox]
- Super Bomb: Organizational Conflict and the Development of the Hydrogen Bomb (Cornell University Press, 2019) [co-author with Ken Young]

Selected articles

- "Civil-Naval Politics in World War I", in World Politics Vol. 7, No. 4 (1955), pp. 572–591.
- "The H-bomb Decision: How to Decide Without Actually Choosing", in Political Science Quarterly Vol. 76, No. 1 (1961), pp. 24–46.
- "Scientists, Foreign Policy, and Politics", in American Political Science Review Vol. 56, No. 2 (1962), pp. 287–300.
- "All You Ever Wanted to Know About MIRV and ICBM Calculations But Were Not Cleared to Ask", in Journal of Conflict Resolution Vol. 17, No. 2 (1973), pp. 207–242. [co-author with Lynn Etheridge Davis]
- "U.S. Strategic Nuclear Concepts in the 1970s: The Search for Sufficiently Equivalent Countervailing Parity", in International Security Volume 6, No. 2 (1981), pp. 48–79.
- "Decision Making in Using Assassinations in International Relations", in Political Science Quarterly Vol. 131, No. 3 (2016), pp. 503–539. [co-author with Jonathan L. Schilling]
