= Rose McDermott =

Rose McDermott is an American political scientist who is the David and Marianna Fisher University Professor of International Relations at Brown University. She has also taught at Cornell, UCSB, and Harvard. She is a member of the American Academy of Arts and Sciences and the recipient of numerous awards and fellowships. Her work is situated at the intersection of several disciplines including political science, psychology, biology, methods, development, and gender studies.

== Early life and education ==
McDermott was raised in Hawaii, United States. Her father was in the Navy. She has a B.A. in Political Science from Stanford University (1984), M.A. in Political Science from Columbia University (1986), M.A. in Experimental Social Psychology from Stanford University (1988), M.A. in Political Science from Stanford University (1990) and a PhD in Political Science from Stanford University (1991).

At Columbia University, she was strongly influenced by Robert Jervis.

== Research ==
McDermott has applied prospect theory to U.S. foreign policy behavior.

Her book Man is by nature a political animal: Evolution, Biology and Politics explored the connection between biological factors and individuals' politics using a variety of experimental methods.

== Publications ==
- Bar-Joseph, Uri & McDermott, Rose (2017). Intelligence Successes and Failure: The Human Factor. New York: Oxford University Press.
- Hatemi, P. & McDermott, R.(Eds.) (2011). Man is by nature a political animal: Evolution, Biology and Politics. Chicago: University of Chicago Press.
- McDermott, R. (November, 2007). Presidential Leadership, Illness and Decision Making. New York: Cambridge University Press.
- Abdelal, R., Herrera, Y., Johnston, A.I. & McDermott, R. (Eds.) (2009). Measuring Identity: A Guide for Social Science Research. New York: Cambridge University Press.
- McDermott, R. (2004). Political Psychology in International Relations. Ann Arbor, MI: University of Michigan Press.
- McDermott, R. (1998). Risk-Taking in International Relations: Prospect Theory in Post-War American Foreign Policy. Ann Arbor, MI: University of Michigan Press.
