= Arnold A. Saltzman =

American businessman, diplomat, art collector, philanthropist (1916–2014)

- Born: Arnold Asa Saltzman; October 1, 1916; Brooklyn, New York City
- Died: January 2, 2014 (aged 97); Sands Point, New York
- Education: Columbia University (BA)
- Occupations: Businessman, philanthropist, diplomat
- Known for: Namesake of the Arnold A. Saltzman Institute of War and Peace Studies
- Spouse: Joan Roth
- Children: 3

Arnold Asa Saltzman (October 1, 1916 – January 2, 2014) was an American businessman, diplomat, art collector, and philanthropist, based in New York.

== Early life, marriage and family ==
Saltzman was born on October 1, 1916, in Brooklyn, New York, to a Russian immigrant father, Isidore, and his wife Dora. It was a Jewish family and he had two sisters. He attended Samuel J. Tilden High School in the East Flatbush section of Brooklyn. He was elected vice president of the student government, and was named class orator by his senior class.

He then entered Columbia College within Columbia University, majoring in economics and government. He was president of his fraternity, Beta Sigma Rho. He earned a top-level award for his performance on the Debate Council. Saltzman graduated with a Bachelor of Arts degree in June 1936, at the age of 19.

He married his wife, the former Joan Roth, in a Jewish ceremony on November 21, 1942. They raised three children, born between 1945 and 1951. They went on to live in Sands Point, New York. His son, Eric Saltzman, served as a director of the Berkman Klein Center for Internet & Society.

== Early business and government career ==
His first job was taken in 1936 with the Premiere Knitting Company, the family sweater business. He then entered government service, working for the Roosevelt administration as a member of the National Industrial Mobilization Committee. He was in charge of the Military Price Control Section of the Office of Price Administration, with $8 billion of defense and Lend-Lease spending under his purview. He was on the Procurement Policy Board, which had representatives from each large government agency. Saltzman joined the United States Coast Guard; by 1943 he was a warrant officer, and then by 1944 he was an ensign in it. During the Korean War, he served in the Office of Price Stabilization.

Saltzman returned to business, becoming vice president and then president of Premiere Knitting. In 1957, Premiere was acquired by Botany Mills, a Passaic, New Jersey manufacturer of textiles that was rapidly expanding and diversifying. He became vice president and a director of Botany Industries, an outgrowth of Botany Mills, from 1959 to 1962. Saltzman was president of the Seagrave Corporation starting in 1961. He took a company that mostly made fire-fighting equipment and diversified it via acquisition and other changes into one that did leather processing, made paint and industrial finishes, constructed low-cost houses, and sold mortgages. He remained president of Seagrave into the 1970s. Around 1970, Saltzman also headed a group that had a 24 percent interest in Trans Beacon Corporation, a movie distribution and theater operation that was a remnant of RKO Pictures.

== Diplomatic and political activities ==
In 1957, Saltzman ran for the board of trustees of the village of Great Neck Estates, New York, on the ticket of the newly created local Village Party and in opposition to the entrenched local Citizens Party. Saltzman and the other Village Party candidates were defeated by decisive margins.

A lifelong Democrat, Saltzman served five U.S. presidents as envoys on diplomatic missions. He was a trouble-shooter for the U.S. Department of State during the Kennedy administration and Johnson administration years. He helped negotiate the Treaty on the Non-Proliferation of Nuclear Weapons in the mid-late 1960s.

Saltzman was a hopeful for the Democratic nomination in the United States Senate election in New York, 1974. But he had little support in the New York State Democratic Committee, and instead he was chosen as an unsalaried advisor to New York State's Congressional delegation as it tried to heal internal divisions. In 1976, he served as chair of the federal Advisory Committee on National Growth Policy Processes; it published a report entitled Forging America's Future: Strategies for National Growth and Development.

He was co-author of the 1990 book Bending with the Winds: Kurt Waldheim and the United Nations. In its review, Foreign Affairs magazine said that the book's examination of Kurt Waldheim's career was "meticulously undertaken" and that its recommendations for how the Secretary-General of the United Nations could better be chosen "[make] the book important today".

== Later business career ==
Still in business, Saltzman headed Vista Resources (which Seagrave had become), a diversified public company, until selling majority interest in it in 1989. He became chair of the Windsor Production Corporation, a privately held oil, real estate, and investment firm. In 1992, he was named by Kyrgyzstan, newly independent of the Soviet Union, as its representative in negotiations for natural-resource arrangements with American companies.

In 1993, Saltzman pleaded guilty in United States District Court for the Eastern District of New York to charges of insurance fraud related to a $610,000 claim before Chubb Insurance on behalf of a leather products company. By 2001, there had still been no sentencing hearing in his case, a delay that legal experts said was extraordinary. In 2002, having previously made financial restitution, Saltzman attempted to withdraw that felony plea, have it expunged, and substitute a misdemeanor plea instead, but a federal judge denied the request.

== Philanthropic activities ==
In 2003, Columbia University's Institute of War and Peace Studies was renamed the Arnold A. Saltzman Institute of War and Peace Studies. Two endowed chairs under the Saltzman name were also added at that time. Saltzman later said, "Anything that can fight war and promote peace I'm for!"

As a benefactor, Saltzman and his wife played a part in the creation of the Joan and Arnold Saltzman Community Services Center at Hofstra University, where he was a trustee emeritus. The center provides health services both to Hofstra and the local community and additionally provides educational and practitioner experience for Hofstra students.

He was founding president of the Nassau County Museum of Art, having been given the charge in the late 1980s by the county executive, Thomas Gulotta, to revive and reimagine the county's former Fine Arts Museum. For this, Newsday named him one of "23 Long Islanders whose track records say they're worth watching" in 1989. He took a hands-on role in the museum task, to the extent of sometimes coming in direct conflict with the director of the museum. The couple are reflected in the name of the Arnold and Joan Saltzman Fine Arts Building there, where he became chairman emeritus. It was given this name following a large-scale renovation of the central building on the museum. In 2012, Saltzman was the originating force behind bringing a world-class Marc Chagall exhibit to the museum.

Saltzman also served as a trustee of the Baltimore Museum of Art and was involved with acquisitions for the Museum of Modern Art in New York. In 2012, the library in Port Washington, New York, named its reading room after the couple following a large gift from the Saltzman Foundation.

== Final years ==
Saltzman died on January 2, 2014, at his home in Sands Point, New York.

== Awards and honors ==
Saltzman was given honorary degrees by Adelphi University in 1985 and Hofstra University in 1986.

In 2002, Saltzman was presented with the Order of Honor from the Republic of Georgia, "in recognition of his notable personal contribution to the implementation of international aid programs [and] his active support of Georgia's interest and generous charity work".
