= Academy of Political Science =

The Academy of Political Science is an American non-profit organization and publisher devoted to cultivating non-partisan, objective analysis of political, social, and economic issues. It is headquartered in The Interchurch Center in New York City. Its current President is Robert Y. Shapiro.

== History ==
Columbia University founded the Academy of Political Science in 1880 to foster cooperation between Columbia University Law School and the Columbia University Graduate School of Political Science. In 1886 the Academy of Political Science began publishing the Political Science Quarterly.

In 1910 the Academy of Political Science incorporated in New York State as a non-profit organization with open membership to all who would pay dues and it enjoyed the financial support from private foundations. At the time, the academy was one of only a handful of organizations that claimed to produce non-partisan, analytical studies. The Brookings Institution was another.

The academy had annual dinners that were attended by politicians, diplomats, scholars, and intellectuals. In 1921, President Warren G. Harding spoke to 1,400 men and women at a luncheon in the Hotel Astor declaring his intention for a drastic reorganization of government and radical cutting of expenditures, asserting that federal, state and municipal governments had been "spending without a thought of the morrow". In 1932, Walter Lippmann spoke about liberalism. "The great concern of the liberal spirit" he told the guests, "rests at last upon the conviction that at almost any cost men must keep open the channels of understanding and preserve unclouded, lucid and serene their perceptiveness of truth." In 1940, then-Secretary of State Henry L. Stimson used the academy's annual dinner to deliver an important pro-preparedness, pro-helping Britain speech.

Vice-President Richard Nixon also attended the academy's annual dinner in 1959.

The academy's history of public service includes meetings and conferences where members attend presentations by scholars on single issues and participate in their discussions. These conferences also draw upon public officials involved in the particular subject matter. In 1917, in co-operation with the American Society of International Law, the academy organized a National Conference on the Foreign Relations of the United States. It was, wrote The New York Times, "the most notable unofficial gathering of authorities on international law and trade, diplomats, statesmen, journalists, publicists, and politicians ever held in this country". A 1932 conference held by the academy brought together distinguished economists, bankers and industrialists to discuss "Steps Toward Recovery".

More recently, the academy has co-sponsored conferences with other distinguished institutions and organizations such as Homes for the Homeless, American Hellenic Institute Foundation, Presidency Research Group of the American Political Science Association, Benjamin N. Cardozo School of Law, The Cooper Union, Community Service Society of New York, and The Italian Academy for Advanced Studies in America.

== Mission ==
The academy has a three-fold educational mission to:

- contribute to the scholarly examination of political institutions, processes, and public policies;
- enrich political discourse and channel the best social science research in an understandable way to political leaders for use in public policy making and the process of governing;
- educate members of the general public so that they become better informed participants in the democratic process.

The major vehicles for accomplishing these goals are primarily the academy's journal, Political Science Quarterly, published since 1886, as well as Academy conferences, books, and other publications.

== Board of directors ==
The academy's board of directors is composed of scholars and academic administrators as well as members of the legal, business, and not-for-profit sectors who are dedicated to the academy's educational mission. Current honorary members include former US president Jimmy Carter, former Secretaries of State George P. Shultz and Madeleine Albright, former Secretary of Defense Robert M. Gates, former National Security Advisor Brent Scowcroft, and former Supreme Court Justice Sandra Day O'Connor.

== See also ==
- Official website
