= Peter Clements =

Australian cricketer (born 1953)

Personal information
- Born: 23 January 1953 (age 73); Adelaide, Australia
- Source: Cricinfo, 4 June 2018

Peter Clements (born 23 January 1953) is an Australian cricketer. He played five first-class matches for South Australia between 1972 and 1975.

== See also ==
- List of South Australian representative cricketers
