= Paul Y. Hammond =

American foreign policy scholar (1929–2012)

Paul Young Hammond (February 24, 1929 – March 9, 2012) was an American foreign policy and security studies scholar. He was Distinguished Service Professor (Emeritus after 2004) at the University of Pittsburgh Graduate School of Public and International Affairs from 1983 on; before that he was the Edward R. Weidlein Professor of environmental and public policy studies beginning in 1976 at the University of Pittsburgh. Before that he was senior social scientist at the RAND Corporation from 1964–76, including being head of the social science department and also being program director for strategic studies and Asian studies during 1973–76. His career earlier saw stints at the Washington Center of Foreign Policy Research at Johns Hopkins University, Yale University, Columbia University, and the United States Naval Academy among other places. Hammond also often worked as a consultant to various departments of the United States Government.

== Early life, education, and family ==
Hammond was born in Salt Lake City, Utah. His father was an attorney and his mother an English teacher; his grandfather was James Thaddeus Hammond, the first Secretary of State of Utah. He attended East High School, graduating in 1944.

Hammond's undergraduate education took place at the University of Utah, followed by advanced degrees earned at Harvard University with additional study at the London School of Economics.

He was married to his wife, the former Merylyn Simmons and also a University of Utah graduate, in 1950 at the Salt Lake LDS Temple. They had five children together. The couple returned to Salt Lake City following his retirement in 2004.

== Career and themes ==
According to the University of Utah, whose College of Social and Behavioral Science lists Hammond among its distinguished alumni, "The distinguishing feature of his career was an ability to enrich academic research with insider perspective and knowledge obtained through carefully designed personal interviews with major and minor players". In doing so, Hammond sought to develop a more discerning understanding of how organizational behavior and domestic political considerations affected all aspects of nuclear strategy and American foreign policy.

American historian Stanley Kutler's work has characterized Hammond's 1961 book Organizing for Defense: The American Military Establishment in the 20th Century as "an excellent history of the development of defense organization through the Eisenhower administration". National security author Mark D. Mandeles, speaking in 2013, said Organizing for Defense still "retained considerable relevance and importance today". Writing for the journal Defense Analysis in 1989, Michael D. Yaffe wrote of the 1962 book Strategy, Politics, and Defense Budgets, which Hammond was joint author of along with Warner R. Schilling and Glenn H. Snyder, that 25 years later "their insights about defense planning still ring true" and that the book was a landmark of defense-policy literature. Hammond's part was a detailed, interviews-based analysis of the formulation of NSC 68 that is regarded as a classic contribution that has not been surpassed in the years since.

Another prominent work of Hammond's was the 1975 textbook Cold War and Détente: The American Foreign Policy Process Since 1945, which was a revision and updating of his 1969 text The Cold War Years: American Foreign Policy since 1945. A review of it for The History Teacher stated that "High points of the book include analysis of the array of options available at critical times and description of the complex roles of various actors in deciding foreign policy in a democratic system." In his texts Hammond disagreed with the "New Left" of American foreign policy revisionism and instead believed that the Cold War represented largely reasonable U.S. responses to Soviet provocations.

== Legacy ==
The Paul Y. Hammond Memorial Lecture is given annually at the University of Pittsburgh.

== Published works ==
- Organizing for Defense: The American Military Establishment in the 20th Century (Princeton University Press, 1961)
- Strategy, Politics, and Defense Budgets (Columbia University Press, 1962) [co-author with Warner R. Schilling and Glenn H. Snyder]
- The Cold War Years: American Foreign Policy since 1945 (Harcourt, Brace and World, 1969)
- Political Dynamics in the Middle East (American Elsevier, 1972) [co-editor with Sidney S. Alexander]
- Cold War and Détente: The American Foreign Policy Process Since 1945 (Harcourt College Publishers, 1975)
- The Reluctant Supplier: U. S. Decision-Making for Arms Sales (Oelgeschlager, Gunn & Hain, 1983) [co-author with David J. Louscher, Michael D. Salomone, and Norman A. Graham]
- LBJ and the Presidential Management of Foreign Relations (University of Texas Press, 1992)
