= Peter Clement (political scientist) =

- Education: State University of New York at Oswego, Michigan State University
- Occupations: professor, author, intelligence analyst
- Organization: School of International and Public Affairs, Columbia University

Peter Clement is an American political scientist and former US intelligence officer. He is a Senior Research Scholar and interim director of the Arnold A. Saltzman Institute of War and Peace Studies at the School of International and Public Affairs, Columbia University.

== Education ==
Clement graduated with a B.A. in liberal arts from the State University of New York at Oswego, followed by a M.A. in Modern European history and a Ph.D. in Russian history from Michigan State University, under the guidance of Robert M. Slusser, in 1987.

== Intelligence career ==
Clement began his career in intelligence focusing on Russia. From 1997 to 2003 he was the Director of the Office of Russian and Eurasian Analysis and CIA's Russia Issue Manager. Next, he served as the presidential daily briefer for Vice-President Dick Cheney, National Security Advisor Condoleezza Rice and Deputy National Security Advisor Adviser Stephen Hadley in 2003–2004. He briefly served at the National Security Council as the Director for Russia and later served as the senior CIA representative to the United States Mission to the United Nations. Clement's culminating position with the CIA was the Deputy Assistant Director for Europe and Eurasia from 2015 to 2017. Upon retiring from intelligence, he received the CIA's Distinguished Career Intelligence Medal by former Deputy Director John E. McLaughlin.

== Academic career ==
While at the CIA, Clement taught Russian history and politics for more than a decade as an adjunct faculty member at the University of Maryland and the University of Virginia’s northern Virginia campus. He joined the faculty at SIPA as a visiting professor from 2012 to 2015. Later, in 2018, he returned permanently. In 2022, Clement was named the interim director of the Arnold A. Saltzman Institute of War and Peace Studies.

== Book chapters ==
- (With Rebecca Fisher, and Rob Johnston), "Is Intelligence Analysis a Discipline?," in Analyzing Intelligence: National Security Practitioners Perspectives, 2d ed., ed. James Bruce and Roger George (Georgetown University Press, 2014).
- “US-Soviet Cooperation in Africa,” in The End of Superpower Conflict in the Third World, ed. Melvin Goodman (Westview Press, 1992).
- “Soviet Policy Toward Africa: An Historical Overview,” in Soviet Policy in the Third World, ed. Carol Saivetz (1989).
- (With W. Raymond Duncan) “The Soviet Union and Central America,” in The USSR and Latin America, ed. Sam Mujal-Leon (1989).
- (With Mary Desjeans), “Soviet Policy in Central America” in Soviet Foreign Policy, ed. Robbin Laird (1987).
- Peter Clement, “Russia-US Relations: A Long Slog Ahead” in Briefing Book for Presidential Candidates, eds. Michael Morell and John McLaughlin (2019).

== Articles ==
- “Putin’s Risk Spiral: The Logic of Escalation in an Unraveling War,” Foreign Affairs online, (2022).
- “From a Historical Perspective: Impact of Intelligence Integration on CIA Analysis,” Center for the Study of Intelligence (2021).
- “Moscow and Nicaragua: Two Sides of Soviet Policy,” Comparative Strategy (1985).
- “Moscow and Southern Africa,” Problems of Communism (1985).
- “The Cuban Missile Crisis,” Directorate of Intelligence 1952–2002: Fifty Years of Informing Policy (CIA: 2002).
