= Michael E. O'Hanlon =

American foreign policy expert

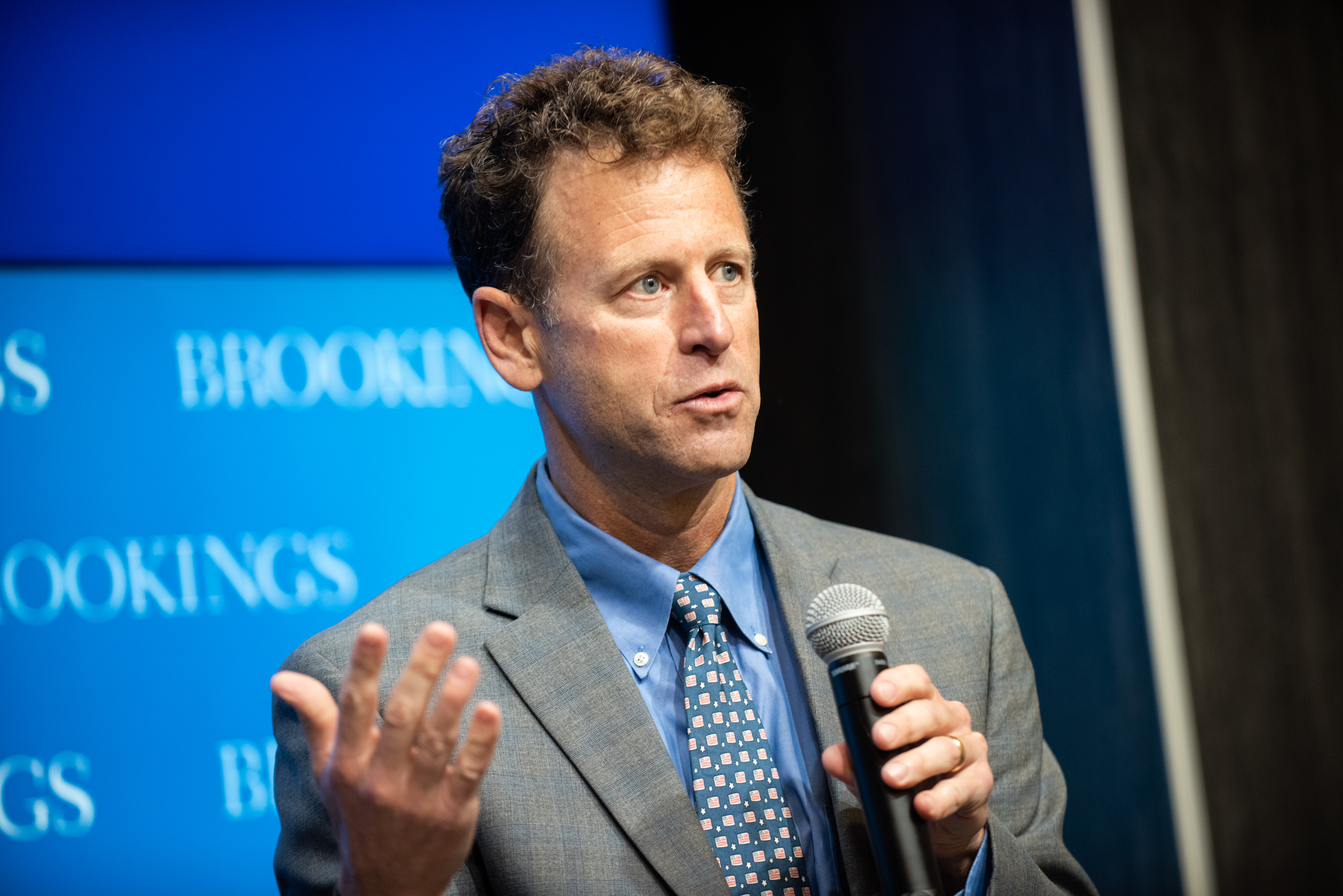
- Education: Princeton University (AB, MSE, MA, PhD)
- Employer: Brookings Institution

Michael Edward O'Hanlon (born May 16, 1961) is an American policy analyst currently who is director of research and senior fellow of the foreign policy program at the Brookings Institution. He began his career as a budget analyst in the defense field.

== Education ==
O'Hanlon's early childhood was spent in the Finger Lakes region of rural upstate New York. He attended Hamilton College for two years before transferring to Princeton to complete his undergraduate studies. He earned an A.B. in 1982 (in physics), M.S.E. in 1987, M.A. in 1988, and a Ph.D. in International affairs in 1991 all from Princeton University.

== Career ==
He served as a Peace Corps volunteer in Kinshasa, Congo in the 1980s. O'Hanlon is reasonably fluent in French, having taught physics in French in the Peace Corps for two years in the Democratic Republic of Congo in the 1980s. He is a visiting lecturer at Princeton.

== Personal life ==
O'Hanlon married Cathryn Ann Garland in 1994. They have two daughters. In addition to his work in the U.S. foreign policy field, he is an activist for people with special needs.

== The Iraq War ==
=== Support and caution ===
Along with Brookings scholar Philip Gordon, O'Hanlon wrote in The Washington Post in late 2001 that any invasion of Iraq would be difficult and demanding and require large numbers of troops. This article led to Kenneth Adelman's famous prediction of a 'cakewalk' in a subsequent rebuttal in that same newspaper, but Gordon and O'Hanlon's argument was validated by subsequent events on the ground. He argued at a major forum on Iraq at the American Enterprise Institute (AEI) in the fall of 2002 that an invasion of Iraq could lead to 150,000 U.S. troops remaining in that country for 5 years, while expressing his view that a war should occur only if inspections failed to fully confirm the disarmament of Saddam's stocks of weapons of mass destruction.

By late 2002 and early 2003, O'Hanlon appeared in the American media as a public proponent of the Iraq War. Interviewed by Bill O'Reilly in Fox News in February 2003, he was asked "Any doubt about going to war with Saddam?" O'Hanlon replied "Not much doubt."

O'Hanlon predicted in early 2003 in the journal Orbis that an invasion of Iraq could lead to as many as several thousand American fatalities, a prediction also confirmed by later developments. He decided in 2003 to create Brookings' Iraq Index, a web-based resource tracking trends in the country that has been perhaps Brookings most widely viewed site this decade, and which led to later decisions to create Afghanistan and Pakistan indices at Brookings as well. Excerpts of these indices ran on a quarterly basis in the New York Times from 2004 through 2012.

On July 9, 2007, O'Hanlon said during a panel discussion in Washington, D.C. that a "soft partition" of Iraq is already occurring that might break the country up into three autonomous regions – Kurdistan, "Shi'astan" and "Sunnistan".

Iraq is being ethnically segregated. Ethnic cleansing is on its way, it's happening, and at least a couple million people have been displaced. It's becoming Bosnia in some ways, he added.

Months after the Surge which increased American troop levels and overhauled the war's strategy, in a July 30, 2007, op-ed piece in The New York Times, O'Hanlon and Kenneth M. Pollack, just back from an 8-day DOD-scheduled itinerary in Iraq reported that:

[A]s two analysts who have harshly criticized the Bush administration's miserable handling of Iraq, we were surprised by the gains we saw and the potential to produce not necessarily 'victory' but a sustainable stability that both we and the Iraqis could live with.

=== Controversy ===
Critics called into question the veracity of O'Hanlon's claim to have been a harsh critic of the Bush administration's handling of Iraq, arguing that it was a deceitful assertion intended to lend the article increased credibility. According to attorney and columnist Glenn Greenwald, O'Hanlon and Pollack "were not only among the biggest cheerleaders for the war, but repeatedly praised the Pentagon's strategy in Iraq and continuously assured Americans things were going well".

On August 25, 2007, he made an attempt to answer his critics in an Op-ed in Washington Post. In response to the charge that he based his judgment on "dog-and-pony shows" in Baghdad, he claimed that his assessment was also informed by years of study of the situation through a large number of knowledgeable sources, including many that were reflected in the Iraq Index (and contributed to its sober message for much of the war).

Writing in the National Interest in May 2008, O'Hanlon gave himself 7 marks out of 10 for his predictions about Iraq, although he acknowledged that among his incorrect positions was his initial support for the war – given the Bush administration's poor preparations for the post-Saddam period.

=== Letter by Project for the New American Century ===
O'Hanlon signed a letter and a statement on postwar Iraq published by the Project for the New American Century.

== Other major areas of research ==
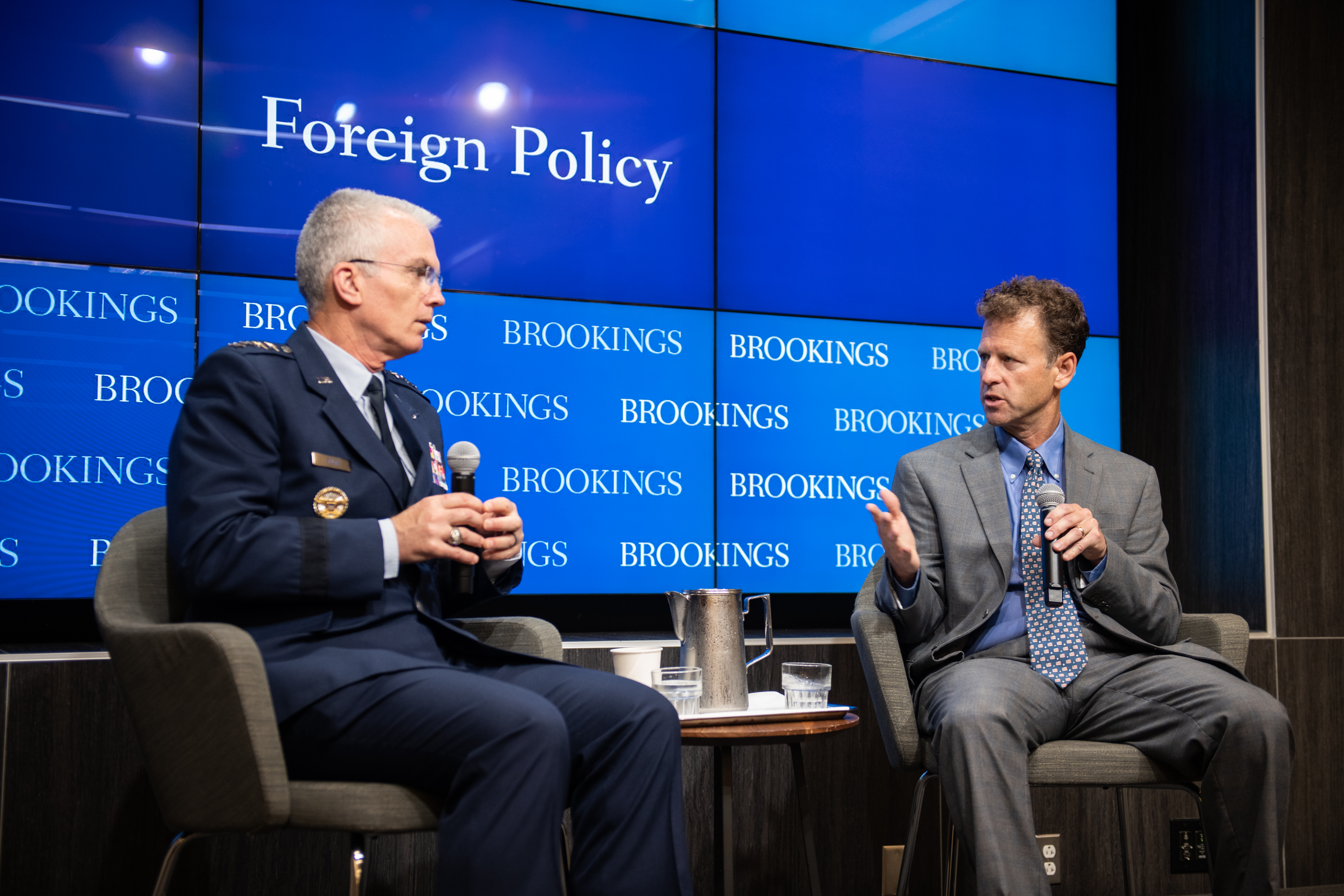
O'Hanlon (right) speaks with Vice Chairman of the Joint Chiefs of Staff, General Paul J. Selva

=== Afghanistan ===
O'Hanlon's 2010 book with Hassina Sherjan, an Afghan-American woman living in Kabul, is called Toughing It Out in Afghanistan. It largely explains and supports the Obama administration's decisions to focus on counterinsurgency in Afghanistan while greatly expanding the size of the US military presence there.

=== Defense analysis ===
O'Hanlon's other main areas of work over the years include studies on defense technology issues, such as missile defense and space weaponry and the future of nuclear weapons policy, on Northeast Asian security coauthored with experts such as Mike Mochizuki and Richard Bush, and on defense strategy and budget issues that follow a long Brookings tradition on the subject pioneered by scholars such as Barry Blechman, William Kaufmann, and Joshua Epstein.

Many of the analytical approaches that O'Hanlon employs in these various efforts were explained in his 2009 Princeton University Press book, The Science of War, which discusses methods of defense analysis – a subject that O'Hanlon currently teaches at Columbia, Princeton and Johns Hopkins, while also directing research in the foreign policy program at Brookings since 2009.

== Partial bibliography ==
- Winning Ugly: NATO's War to Save Kosovo (with Ivo Daalder; 2000)
- Crisis on the Korean Peninsula: How to Deal with a Nuclear North Korea (with Mike Mochizuki; 2003)
- Neither Star Wars nor Sanctuary: Constraining the Military Uses of Space (2004)
- Defense Strategy for the Post-Saddam Era (2005)
- The Future of Arms Control (with Michael A. Levi; 2005)
- Protecting the Homeland 2006/2007 (with Michael d'Arcy, Peter Orszag, Jeremy Shapiro, and James Steinberg; 2006)
- Hard Power: The New Politics of National Security (with Kurt Campbell; 2006)
- Toughing It Out in Afghanistan (with Hassina Sherjan; 2010)
- Bending History: Barack Obama's Foreign Policy (with Martin Indyk and Kenneth Lieberthal; 2012)
- The Opportunity: Next Steps in Reducing Nuclear Arms (with Steven Pifer; 2012)
- The Future of Land Warfare (2015) ISBN 9780815726890
- The Senkaku Paradox (2019)
- Defense 101: Understanding the Military of Today and Tomorrow (Cornell University Press, 2021)
- The Art of War in an Age of Peace: U.S. Grand Strategy and Resolute Restraint (Yale University Press, 2021)
- Military History for the Modern Strategist (Brookings Institution Press, 2023)
- To Dare Mighty Things: U.S. Defense Strategy Since the Revolution (Yale University Press, 2026)
