= Glenn Snyder =

American political scientist (1924–2013)

Glenn Herald Snyder (October 8, 1924 – February 14, 2013) was professor emeritus of political science at the University of North Carolina at Chapel Hill. His expertise was in the fields of international relations theory and security studies. He made influential contributions to the study of alliances and deterrence theory, which include establishing the theory of the Stability–instability paradox.

Snyder was born in Superior, Wisconsin and served as a second lieutenant in the United States Army Air Forces during World War II from 1943 to 1945. He graduated from the University of Oregon in 1948, then worked as a reporter for The Wall Street Journal from 1949 to 1951. He received an M.A. and a PhD in political science from Columbia University in 1953 and 1956 respectively. From 1953 until 1955, he worked as a teaching fellow at Wesleyan University, then from 1955 to 1958 he worked as a lecturer and research associate in the Institute of War and Peace Studies at Columbia before taking a position in Princeton University's Center of International Studies, which he held until 1960. Next, Snyder taught at the University of Denver and the University of California, Berkeley. In 1964, Snyder joined the department of political science at the State University of New York Buffalo, where he taught until 1984. From 1967 to 1973, he also served as chairman of the Center of International Conflict Studies at SUNY-Buffalo. In 1984, Snyder joined the University of North Carolina at Chapel Hill as professor of political science.

Snyder is the author or co-author of six books on international relations and numerous journal articles.

== Published works ==
- Deterrence and Defense: Toward a Theory of National Security (Princeton University Press, 1961)
- Strategy, Politics and Defense Budgets (Columbia University Press, 1962) [co-author with Warner R. Schilling and Paul Y. Hammond]
- Stockpiling Strategic Materials: Politics and National Defense (Chandler Publishing, 1966)
- Conflict Among Nations: Bargaining, Decision Making, and System Structure in International Crises (Princeton University Press, 1977) [co-author with Paul Diesing]
- Alliance Politics (Cornell University Press, 1997)
