= Homes for the Homeless =

U.S. non-profit organization

Homes for the Homeless (HFH) is a 501(c)(3) private, non-profit organization which provides housing and employment training for homeless people in New York City. It has a family-based, child-centered and education-focused approach to its programming that aims to break the cycle of poverty, foster positive identities and promote future success.

From 1986 to 1991, HFH sheltered hundreds of families in New York in some of the largest homeless shelters in the United States.

As of 2019, HFH maintains smaller homeless shelters under contract from the city in the Bronx and Queens.

== Executive compensation ==
As of through 2021, CEO of Homes for Homeless was reported as the highest paid homeless services executive in the United States at $574,000/year.,
