= Political Science Quarterly =

Double blind peer-reviewed academic journal

- Discipline: Political science
- Language: English
- Edited by: Robert Y. Shapiro

Publication details
- History: 1886–present
- Publisher: Academy of Political Science (United States)
- Frequency: Quarterly
- Impact factor: 2.675 (2020)

Standard abbreviations
- ISO 4: Political Sci. Q.
- NLM: Polit Sci Q

Indexing
- ISSN: 0032-3195 (print); 1538-165X (web)
- LCCN: 07036315
- JSTOR: 00323195
- OCLC no.: 785797935

Links
- Journal homepage; Online archive; Online archive (Academy of Political Science)

Political Science Quarterly is an American double blind peer-reviewed academic journal covering government, politics, and policy, published since 1886 by the Academy of Political Science. Its editor-in-chief is Robert Y. Shapiro (Columbia University). Each issue consists of five or six articles as well as up to 40 book reviews.

According to the Journal Citation Reports, the journal has a 2020 impact factor of 2.675, ranking it 60th out of 183 journals in the category "Political Science." According to the SCImago Journal Rank, the PSQ has a score of 1.025, ranking it 159 out of 1316 journals in the category "Sociology and Political Science."

== History ==
Political Science Quarterly was established in 1886 by John W. Burgess (Columbia University), the Academy's first president, with the active involvement of New York publisher George A. Plimpton.

Demetrios James Caraley, political scientist at Columbia University, served as the editor of the journal for 47 years from 1973 to 2020.
