= Sarah Binder =

American political scientist

Sarah A. Binder
- Occupations: Author; Political scientist professor
- Awards: American Academy of Arts and Sciences (2015)

Academic background
- Education: University of Minnesota; Yale University

Sarah A. Binder is an American political scientist, author, senior fellow with the Brookings Institution, and professor of political science at George Washington University's Columbian College of Arts and Science.

== Early life and education ==
Binder graduated with a B.A. in political science from Yale University in 1986 and earned a PhD from the University of Minnesota in 1995.

== Career ==
Binder started her career serving as Lee Hamilton's legislative aide and press secretary from 1986 to 1990. In 1995, Binder became a research fellow at the Brookings Institution, where she serves as a senior fellow in Governance Studies. She also served as Robert Hartley Research Fellow and in 1999, joined George Washington University, where she serves as a professor of political science.

Binder is a member of the Center for Effective Public Management and serves as President of the Midwest Political Science Foundation for the 2018–2019 term. She also chairs the MPSA's publishing-ethics committee, which oversees the editorial process at the American Journal of Political Science to guard against conflict-of-interest concerns.

== Publications ==
Binder has authored and co-authored different books and various publications.

Among her notable works are:

- Minority Rights, Majority Rule: Partisanship and the Development of Congress (1997)
- Stalemate: Causes and Consequences of Legislative Gridlock (2003)
- Advice and Dissent: The Struggle to Shape the Federal Judiciary (together with Forrest Maltzman, 2009)
- The Myth of Independence: How Congress Governs the Federal Reserve (together with Mark Spindel, 2017)

Binder served as co-editor of the Wiley Library's publication Legislative Studies Quarterly and also serves as and editor and contributor of the Washington Post's Monkey Cage blog.

== Awards ==
In 2003, Binder received the American Political Science Association's (APSA) Richard F. Fenno, Jr. Prize, recognizing her book "Stalemate" as the best book in legislative politics.

In 2015, she became an elected member of the American Academy of Arts and Sciences.

In 2018, she was awarded APSA's Gladys M. Kammerer Award for the best book published in the field of U.S. national policy in 2017.
