= Edward J. Bermingham =

Edward J. Bermingham (1887–1958) was a prominent investment banker and correspondent of Dwight D. Eisenhower. Bermingham worked for Lehman Brothers and Dillon, Read and Company, and was a trustee of Columbia University.

Bermingham was a member of Columbia University's graduating class of 1909. He first met Eisenhower when Eisenhower became President of Columbia. During his tenure at Columbia, and later as Commander in Chief of Supreme Headquarters Allied Powers Europe, Eisenhower exchanged long letters with Bermingham, outlining in detail his views of world affairs. When Mr. Eisenhower became President of the United States the correspondence continued and the two men met at least twice at the White House.

Bermingham was a member of the financial committee of the Republican National Committee and instrumental in Eisenhower's nomination. In retirement he raised cattle on his Wyoming ranch. At the time of Bermingham's death he was a trustee of the Eisenhower Foundation in Abilene, Kansas.
