= Paul Raushenbush =

American Baptist minister and activist (born 1964)

Paul Brandeis Raushenbush
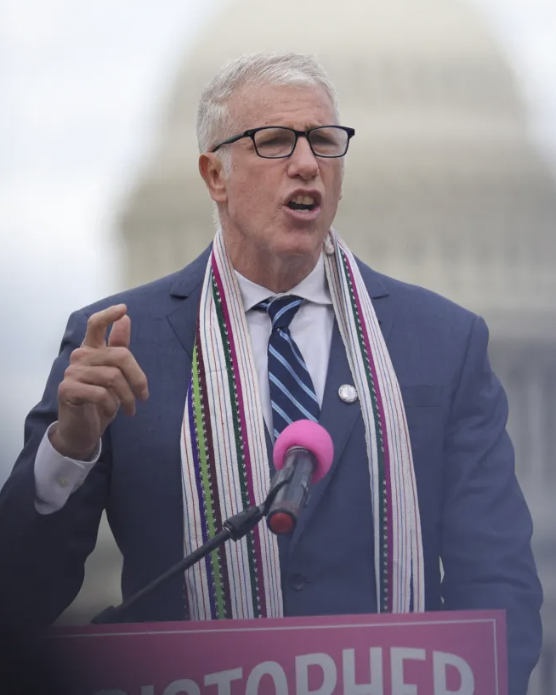
- Raushenbush at Trans Day of Visibility 2025
- Born: June 24, 1964 (age 62)
- Occupation: Baptist minister
- Known for: President/CEO, Interfaith Alliance; appointed 2022
- Spouse: Brad Gooch

Paul Brandeis Raushenbush, (/ˈraʊʃənbʊʃ/; born 24 June 1964) is an American Baptist minister, writer, editor, and religious activist, is president and CEO of Interfaith Alliance.

He formerly served as Senior Advisor for Public Affairs and Innovation at Interfaith America (formerly the Interfaith Youth Core), and was Senior Vice President and editor of Voices at Auburn Seminary. From 2009 to 2015 he was the Executive Editor of Global Spirituality and Religion for Huffington Post's Religion section, and formerly served as editor of BeliefNet. From 2003 to 2011, Raushenbush served as Associate Dean of Religious Life and the Chapel at Princeton University, and served as President of the Association of College and University Religious Affairs (ACURA) from 2009 to 2011. Raushenbush is the co-founder with Wolfgang F. Danspeckgruber of PORDIR, The Program of Religion, Diplomacy, and International Relations at the Liechtenstein Institute on Self-Determination at Princeton University.

Ordained in the American Baptist tradition, Raushenbush is the great-grandson of 19th-century Baptist cleric and Social Gospel proponent Walter Rauschenbusch (name spelled differently). He is also the great-grandson of Supreme Court Justice, Louis D. Brandeis and cousin of Richard Rorty.

He is a graduate of Macalester College and Union Theological Seminary in New York. He is married to the author Brad Gooch, and they have two children.

== Organizations ==
On July 22, 2022, it was announced that Raushenbush would become the new president and CEO of The Interfaith Alliance, replacing Rabbi Jack Moline.

Raushenbush was asked the question: "Is separation of church and state going to be a big issue for the Interfaith Alliance?" Rev. Paul Raushenbush replied:

"Absolutely. The origin of church and state is to protect religion from over-encroachment by the state. Public schools should be places where people can come as they are. That includes nonreligious people, whether secular humanists or atheists. I’m not interested in erasure. I want to draw the line at making religion positive and non-coercive."

== Political Views and Alliance Leadership ==
Raushenbush has been critical of the Trump administration’s positions on religious freedom, especially as it pertains to democracy, immigrant rights, and LGBTQ+ rights.

He participated in local protests in Minneapolis after the killings of Renée Nicole Macklin Good and Alex Jeffrey Pretti by U.S. federal immigration agents. Raushenbush has stressed the importance of peaceful protests by faith movements and communities against ICE.

Raushenbush and Interfaith Alliance are named co-plaintiffs in a 2026 lawsuit, The Interfaith Alliance v. Trump, filed against the Trump Administration’s Religious Liberty Commission in the United States District Court for the Southern District of New York, charging that the commission’s almost exclusively Christian membership undermines religious freedom and violates the Federal Advisory Committee Act.

On February 24, 2026, Raushenbush delivered the opening remarks at the People’s State of the Union, a live counterprogramming event to President Donald Trump’s State of the Union featuring Democratic elected officials and progressive leaders. Raushenbush stated that the Trump administration is “the most hostile to religious freedom in generations” and has “weaponized religion for their white Christian nationalist crusade.”

Raushenbush has been a critic of book and library censorship, attempts to insert religion into public schools, and attacks on NGOs and civil society.

== Bibliography ==
- Teen Spirit: One World, Many Faiths (2004)
- Editor of Christianity and the Social Crisis - in the 21st century
