= Gyula Moravcsik =

Professor of Byzantine languages (1892–1972)

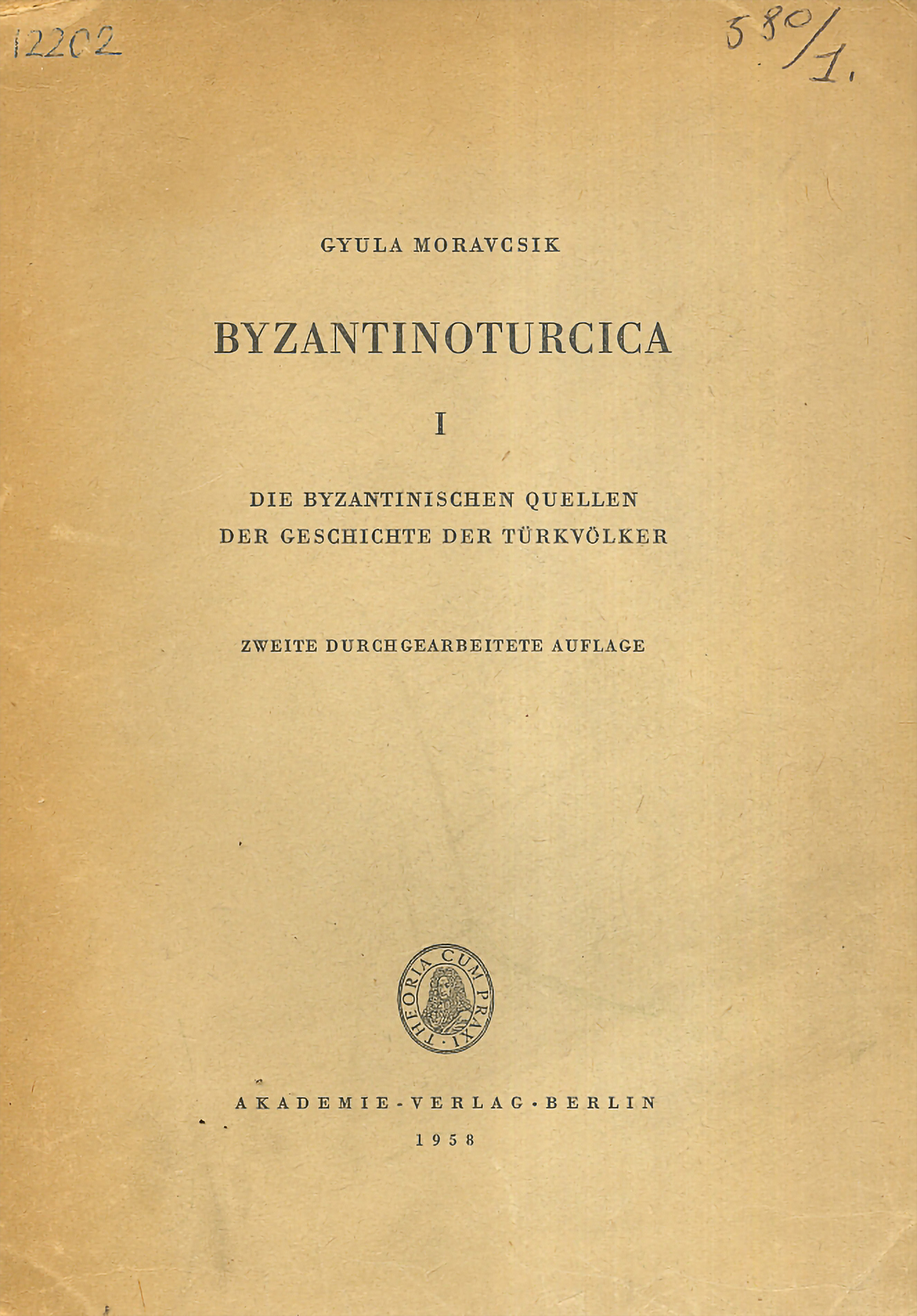
The cover of the Berlin edition of Byzantinoturcica I by Gyula Moravcsik.

Gyula (Julius) Moravcsik (Budapest, 29 January 1892 – Budapest, 10 December 1972), who usually wrote just as Gy. Moravcsik, was a Hungarian professor of Greek philology and Byzantine history who in 1967 was awarded the Pour le Mérite for Sciences and Arts.

== Scholarship ==
Moravcsik explored in depth the relationship between Byzantium and the Turkic peoples, broadly defined and so including Hungarians, and this was reflected in the two volumes of Byzantinoturcica and the 1953 Bizánc és a Magyarság (Byzantium and the Magyars).

With R.J.H. Jenkins, he produced the critical and translated edition of Constantine VII Porphyrogenitus' De Administrando Imperio. That work was first published in Budapest, 1949, and later at Dumbarton Oaks. Moravcsik also contributed to the later Commentary, also in the Dumbarton Oaks series.

== Family ==
His elder son Michael Moravcsik (1928–1989), became professor of physics at University of Oregon. His younger son, Julius Moravcsik (1931–2009), became a professor of philosophy at Stanford University. His daughter, Edith A. Moravcsik, became a professor of linguistics at the University of Wisconsin-Milwaukee. His grandson, Andrew Moravcsik, became Professor of Politics and International Affairs at Princeton University.

== Selected publications ==
- Byzantinoturcica I and II, Budapest 1942 & 1943. Second edition, Berlin 1958.
- Bizánc és a Magyarság. 1953.
- Studia Byzantina. 1967.
- Moravcsik, Gyula, ed. (1967) [1949]. Constantine Porphyrogenitus: De Administrando Imperio (2nd revised ed.). Washington D.C.: Dumbarton Oaks Center for Byzantine Studies. ISBN 978-0-88402-021-9.
- Moravcsik, Gyula (1970). Byzantium and the Magyars. Budapest: Akadémiai Kiadó.
