= Michael Moravcsik =

American theoretical physicist

Michael J. Moravcsik
- Born: June 25, 1928; Budapest, Central Hungary, Hungary
- Died: April 25, 1989 (aged 60); Turin, Piedmont, Italy
- Citizenship: American
- Education: Harvard University, 1951. PhD Cornell University 1956
- Children: Andrew and Julia
- Awards: Derek de Solla Price Memorial Medal 1985
- Scientific career
- Fields: High Energy Physics
- Workplaces: University of Oregon
- Doctoral advisor: Hans Bethe

Michael Julius Alexander Moravcsik (Hungarian pronunciation: [moravt͡ʃik]; Hungarian: Moravcsik Mihály; 25 June 1928 – 25 April 1989) was a Hungarian-born American theoretical high energy physicist whose areas of research included the two nucleon system, particle spin symmetries. He also made important contributions to the practice and study of science policy in developing nations, scientific methodology, and scientometrics (the science of science), especially the study of citation and citation indices.

== Family and personal life ==
Moravcsik was born June 25, 1928, in Budapest. His father, Gyula Moravcsik, was a professor of Greek philology and Byzantine history. His mother, Edit Moravcsik (née Fleissig), assisted her husband and taught language in Budapest. His grandfather, Fleissig Sándor, was a prominent Hungarian banker and politician. His brother was Julius Moravcsik, an academic philosopher who taught at Stanford University. His sister is Edith A. Moravcsik, a noted academic linguist who teaches at the University of Wisconsin–Milwaukee. He was married to Francesca Moravcsik and had two children, Andrew Moravcsik, Professor of Politics and Public Affairs at Princeton University. His daughter Julia is a cognitive psychologist residing in Boulder, Colorado.

== Education, scientific interests and professional accomplishments ==
Moravcsik began his studies at the University of Budapest, but left Hungary for the United States at the age of 20, accompanied by his brother Julius. He completed his BS in physics at Harvard University in 1951 and received his PhD from Cornell University in 1956. He was a research associate at the Brookhaven National Laboratory from 1956 to 1958. He was head of the elementary particle and nuclear theory group, theoretical division, Lawrence Berkeley National Laboratory from 1958 to 1967. From 1967 until his death, he was a professor of physics at the University of Oregon, at the Institute of Theoretical Science, where he was director from 1969 to 1972. At the time he was a professor of physics at the University of Oregon.

Two journals had memorial issues for Moravcsik: Scientometrics (Volume20, No 1, 1991) and Few Body Systems (Volume 9, No 2-3, 1990)

== Scientific interests and accomplishments ==
Moravcsik worked on the nucleon-nucleon interaction in scattering experiments, and the pion-nucleon coupling constant.

He also focused on science policy and its effects in developing countries. He was a science policy advisor to the Ford Foundation, UNESCO, the American Association for the Advancement of Science, and the National Science Foundation. In addition, he made important contributions to the field of scientometrics.

In his spare time, Moravcsik wrote music reviews and was an amateur opera singer.

== Death ==
He died of an embolism on April 25, 1989, in Turin, Italy, where he was collaborating with a colleague. He has three (posthumous) grandchildren: Michael Edward Hoke Moravcsik, Alexander deGogorza Moravcsik, and Sean Timothy Bowling.

== Books authored ==
- "On the Road to Worldwide Science: Contributions to Science Development" World Scientific, 1988.
- "Musical sound: an introduction to the physics of music" Springer Science & Business Media, 1987.
- "How to Grow Science" New York, NY : Universe Books, 1980.
- "The Two-Nucleon Interaction"

== Selected papers ==
- "Creativity in science education" MJ Moravcsik. Science Education, 1981
- "Variation of the nature of citation measures with journals and scientific specialties." Murugesan, Poovanalingam, and Michael J. Moravcsik. Journal of the American Society for Information Science 29.3 (1978): 141-147
- "Optimally simple connection between the reaction matrix and the observables" GR Goldstein, MJ Moravcsik. Annals of Physics, 1976
- "Some results on the function and quality of citations." Moravcsik, Michael J., and Poovanalingam Murugesan. Social studies of science 5.1 (1975): 86-92
- "Measures of scientific growth" MJ Moravcsik. Research Policy, 1973
- "Nucleon-nucleon scattering experiments and their phenomenological analysis" Malcolm H. Mac Gregor, M.J. Moravcsik, H.P. Stapp (Dec, 1960) Ann.Rev.Nucl.Part.Sci. 10 (1960) 291-352
- "Analytic forms of the deuteron wave function" MJ Moravcsik. Nuclear Phys., 1958
