= Liechtenstein Institute on Self-Determination =

Research institution in New Jersey, US

Coordinates: 40.34914°N 74.65362°W

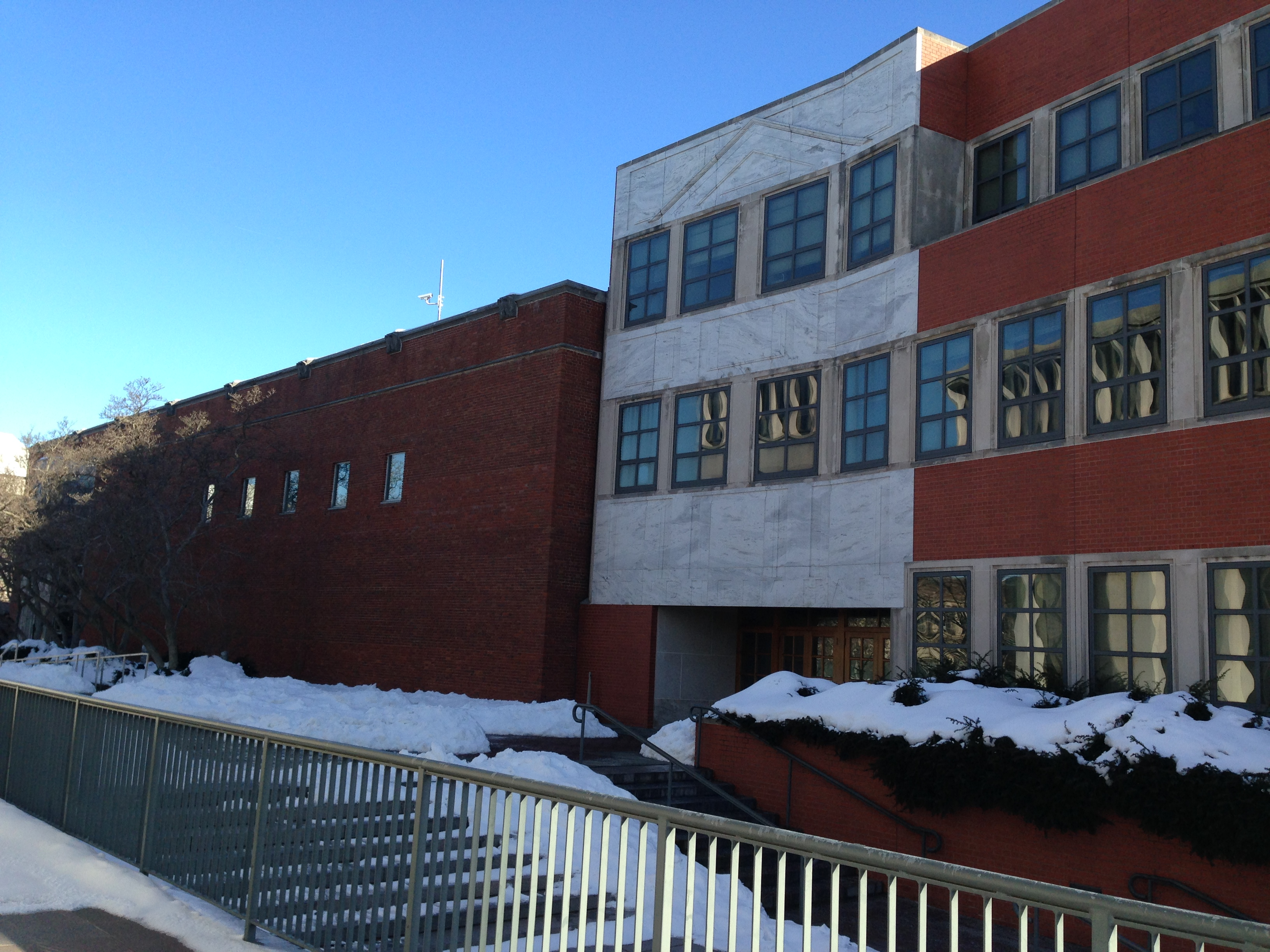
- Bendheim Hall, Princeton University
- Type: Private
- Established: 2000
- Founder: Wolfgang Danspeckgruber
- Parent institution: Princeton University
- Director: Andrew Moravcsik
- Faculty: approx. 39 professors and fellows
- Location: Princeton, New Jersey, United States
- Website: lisd.princeton.edu

The Liechtenstein Institute on Self-Determination (LISD) is a research institute on self-determination, self-governance, and diplomacy. Founded in 2000 by the Prince Hans-Adam II of Liechtenstein, the Institute aims to enhance global peace and stability through its projects, publications, and commentaries.

The overarching principles of LISD are outlined in the Liechtenstein Draft Convention on Self-Determination Through Self-Administration (2002), which was drafted by Hans-Adam II and Sir Arthur Watts. The manuscript outlines the general principle of self-determination as detailed by the United Nations General Assembly. It addresses, not only the set of proposals and technical requirements for the so-called Liechtenstein Initiative, but it also considers the structure of a treaty as a legal instrument for future cases.

== History ==
In 2000, Prince Hans Adam II (born 1945) established a fund for the Liechtenstein Institute on Self-Determination, which was based at Princeton University in Princeton, New Jersey. The $12 million gift provides funding, support, and space for faculty, students, and policymakers to engage in research on self-determination. Founding Director Wolfgang Danspeckgruber remarked that LISD aims to "reduce the tumultuous and frequently violent process inherent in the search for increased autonomy.” The early projects at LISD included one on state power, borders, and self-governance in the former Soviet Union, and another that sought to analyze tensions among separatist groups in Kashmir. Since then, LISD has broadened in scope to include projects in a wide variety of geographic regions. More recent projects include LISD's focus on conflicts in the Balkan region, especially in states such as Kosovo, Montenegro, and North Macedonia. There has also been interest in researching aspects of Tibetan self-determination in partnership with the Association for Asian Studies.

== Academics ==
=== Organization ===
As of the 2018-2019 academic year, LISD has 39 faculty associates and 20 non-resident Fellows. The members of the executive committee include Cecilia Rouse, Dean of the Princeton School of Public and International Affairs; Mark R. Beissinger, Henry W. Putnam Professor of Politics; and Amaney Jamal, Edwards S. Sanford Professor of Politics. Members of the Executive Committee include Prince Hans Adam II of Liechtenstein; Hereditary Prince Alois of Liechtenstein; and Ursula Plassnik, Ambassador of the Republic of Austria to the Swiss Confederation. In addition to the executive committee, the advisory council also allows input from scholars at other universities and research institutes to lead new projects. Members of the advisory council include Ali Ansari, Professor of Iranian History at the University of St. Andrews, and William A. Maley, Professor of Asia-Pacific College of Diplomacy at the Australian National University.

=== Courses ===
The Institute organizes a number of courses at Princeton University, including "Theory and Practice of International Diplomacy" and "Topics in International Relations: International Crisis Diplomacy". These courses aim to provide undergraduate and graduate students with foundational knowledge about the causes and implications of geopolitical conflicts and crises. In October 2018, LISD co-sponsored a new online edX course with Tel Aviv University entitled "HOPE: Human Odyssey to Political Existentialism". The course explores various themes that define humanity. Outside of coursework, students are able take part in various initiatives such as the Emerging Foreign and Security Dimensions (EFSD) Fellowship or the Program on Religion, Diplomacy, and International Relations (PORDIR).

== Research ==
=== Faculty and Fellows ===
Faculty and research Fellows of LISD frequently publish in national and international media outlets. Resident Fellows spend a year at Princeton University. Faculty and Fellows associated with LISD include:

- David Baldwin - Senior Political Scientist, Princeton School of Public and International Affairs
- Gary J. Bass - Professor of Politics and International Affairs
- Alison Boden - Dean of Religious Life and the Chapel, Lecturer
- Carles Boix - Robert Garrett Professor of Politics and Public Affairs
- L. Carl Brown - Garrett Professor in Foreign Affairs, Emeritus, Professor of Near Eastern Studies, Emeritus
- Thomas J. Christensen - William P. Boswell Professor of World Politics of Peace and War, co-director of the China and the World Program
- Christopher Chyba - Professor of Astrophysical Sciences and International Affairs, director of the Program on Science and Global Security
- Michael Cook - University Professor of Near Eastern Studies
- Christina Davis - Associate Professor of Politics and International Affairs
- Paul DiMaggio - Professor of Sociology and International Affairs, Emeritus
- Robert George - McCormick Professor of Jurisprudence, director of the James Madison Program in American Ideals and Institutions
- M. Şükrü Hanioğlu - Professor and Chair of Near Eastern Studies, Garrett Professor in Foreign Affairs
- Bernard Haykel - Professor of Near Eastern Studies, director of the Institute for Transregional Study of the Contemporary Middle East, North Africa and Central Asia
- G. John Ikenberry - Albert G. Milbank Professor of Politics and International Affairs
- Harold James - Claude and Lore Kelly Professor in European Studies, Professor of History and International Affairs, director of the Program in Contemporary European Politics and Society
- Stanley N. Katz - Lecturer (with Rank of Professor) of International Affairs, Faculty Chair of the Princeton School of Public and International Affairs Undergraduate Program, director of the Princeton University Center for Arts and Cultural Policy Studies
- Nannerl O. Keohane - Senior Scholar, University Center for Human Values
- Robert Keohane -Professor of International Affairs, Princeton School of Public and International Affairs
- Stephen M. Kotkin - John P. Birkelund '52 Professor in History and International Affairs, director of the Princeton Institute for International and Regional Studies
- Daniel C. Kurtzer - Lecturer and S. Daniel Abraham Professor in Middle Eastern Policy Studies
- Nolan McCarty - Susan Dod Brown Professor of Politics and Public Affairs, Chair of the Politics Department
- Sophie Meunier - Senior Research Scholar, Princeton School of Public and International Affairs, co-director of the European Union Program
- Helen V. Milner - B.C. Forbes Professor of Politics and International Affairs, director of the Niehaus Center for Globalization and Governance
- Andrew Moravcsik - Professor of Politics and International Affairs, director of the European Union Program
- Kim Lane Scheppele - Laurance S. Rockefeller Professor of Sociology and International Affairs, director of the Program in Law and Public Affairs
- Anne-Marie Slaughter - Bert G. Kerstetter '66 University Professor Emerita of Politics and International Affairs
- Frank N. von Hippel - Professor of Public and International Affairs, co-director of the Program on Science and Global Security
- Sigurd Wagner - Professor of Electrical Engineering, Emeritus
- Jennifer Widner - Professor of Politics and International Affairs, director of the Mamdouha S. Bobst Center for Peace and Justice
- Deborah Yashar - Professor of Politics and International Affairs, co-director of the Democracy and Development Project

=== Events ===
LISD hosts a number of workshop, events, and seminars for Princeton-affiliated students, faculty, and staff, as well as the general public. Most events are held on campus at Bendheim Hall, while some have been hosted by the Princeton Club of New York and the headquarters of the United Nations in New York.

=== Projects ===
Major projects at LISD include State, Sovereignty, and Self-Determination, which addresses issues of boundaries, governance, and autonomy; Self-Determination and Emerging Issues, which focuses on self-determination as it relates to migration and the environment; and the Organization for Security and Co-operation in Europe, which promotes dialogue on the region. Funding for these projects and others comes from the Liechtenstein government, Princeton University, and the Carnegie Corporation of New York.

LISD also runs a number of research tools that provide scholars, think tanks, and governments access to original research. These tools include Encyclopedia Princetoniensis: The Princeton Encyclopedia of Self-Determination (PESD), Diachronic Global Corpus (DiGCor), and the Digital Interactive Regional Mapping and Information System (DIRMAIS). DIRMAIS combines historical and contemporary data to visualize international crises.
