= Stetsenko =

Stetsenko (Ukrainian: Стеце́нко) is a Ukrainian surname. Outside of Ukraine, it is also prevalent in Russia and found in the United States.

Notable people with this surname include:

- Anna Stetsenko, Soviet-American psychologist
- Anna Stetsenko (swimmer) (born 1992), Ukrainian Paralympian
- Kyrylo Stetsenko (1882–1922), Ukrainian composer
- Oleksandr Stetsenko (born 1990), Ukrainian footballer
- Paul Stetsenko (born 1962), Ukrainian-American musician
- Tatyana Stetsenko (born 1957), Soviet rower
- Yuri Stetsenko (born 1945), Ukrainian canoeist
