= Paul Stetsenko =

American musician (born 1962)

- Павло Стеценко
- Born: Pavlo Hryhorovych Stetsenko; 1962 (age 63–64); Kiev, Ukrainian SSR, Soviet Union (now Kyiv, Ukraine)
- Occupations: Organist, choral conductor, composer

Paul T. Stetsenko (Note: Ukrainian: Павло Григорович Стеценко, romanized: Pavlo Hryhorovych Stetsenko) (born 1962) is a Ukrainian-born organist, choral conductor, and composer of church music.

Stetsenko, the son of an architect and a painter, always wished that he could be an organist, growing up in Kyiv, Ukraine. He studied choral conducting at the Rheingold M. Glière Music College, and later piano at the Kyiv Conservatory, where he earned a master of music degree cum laude in 1989. In 1990 he moved to New York City to study organ and church music at The Juilliard School. After completing his master's degree in organ, Stetsenko then earned a Doctor of Musical Arts degree from The Juilliard School in 2000. His teachers include John B. Weaver (organ), Leonid Shulman (conducting), Olga Orlova (piano), and Liudmila Kasyanenko (piano).

In 2009–2011, Paul Stetsenko performed the complete organ works of J. S. Bach as part of Bach Vespers at Westminster, in Alexandria, Virginia.
