= Liberal intergovernmentalism =

Political theory in international relations

Liberal intergovernmentalism is a political theory in international relations developed by Andrew Moravcsik in 1993 to explain European integration. The theory is based upon and has further developed the intergovernmentalist theory and offers a more authentic perspective than its predecessor with its inclusion of both neo-liberal and realist aspects in its theory.

== Theory ==
Liberal intergovernmentalism was created to be a "grand theory"--that is, a synthesis of mid-range theories. Liberal intergovernmentalism argues that it is impossible to explain the concept of the European Union with a single factor and that different approaches or theories are needed to genuinely understand the complexity of the EU. It was originally created to explain broad evolution of regional integration, though it applies also to many everyday decisions.

In his book The Choice for Europe (1998), Moravcsik describes EU integration from 1957 to 1992 as follows: "EU integration can best be understood as a series of rational choices made by national leaders. These choices responded to constraints and opportunities stemming from the economic interests and relative power of powerful domestic constituents, the relative power of states stemming from asymmetrical interdependence, and the role of institutions in bolstering the credibility of interstate commitments." Moravcsik himself, Frank Schimmelfennig and others have subsequently observed that LI explanations need not be limited to economic interests, but that these were simply the social interests most relevant for explaining the period covered in that book. Subsequent work has extended the model.

Liberal intergovernmentalism (LI) views states as the main political actors in political interactions, and sees the EU as an international institution that can be studied by viewing states as the main actors in a situation of anarchy, where each state achieves their goal through negotiations and bargaining. Yet there are two important caveats. First, while states are the main political actors, LI is a liberal not a realist theory, and thus all states are understood as representative institutions acting to advance the pre-strategic preferences of some (usually biased) coalition of domestic social groups with a stake in the way social, cultural or economic interdependence is managed. So, while states are superficially the primary actors or "transmission belts" whereby social interests are aggregated, advanced and enforced, the most fundamental actors in LI remain transnationally active individuals and social groups. Second, LI posits, following conventional regime theory, that states delegate or pool sovereignty in regional institutions in order to coordinate their policies and establish credible commitments. This the critical third step in the theory. So while states ultimately are in anarchy (as Brexit shows), at any given moment, they are often making decisions within an institutionalized international environment and they create such institutions in the expectation that they will shape state behavior.

Liberal intergovernmentalism has demonstrated its usefulness with its methods of organizing and constructing empirical studies. Studies of the scholarly literature, however, show that it serves as a "baseline" theory of integration: that is, it is the theory that most empirical studies either confirm or use as a basic control in order to define anomalies. However, liberal intergovernmentalism has also been heavily criticized. A general criticism of liberal intergovernmentalism is that it focuses on the theory of grand bargaining and major decisions, and that it has no way of explaining everyday decision-making procedures. Many critics point out that Moravcsik's early work focuses on the treaty-amending moments and member-states economic interests, rather than the everyday policy agendas that represent the majority of EU policies. However, Moravcsik responds that the theory obviously has utility in explaining everyday decisions: few analysts today would deny that the European Council and Council of Ministers remain the EU's most important decision-making bodies (perhaps more so than 25 years ago), that the starting point for analyzing the Council's behavior is to understand the nature and intensity of state preferences and the relative influence of different states. Indeed, recent years have witnessed the emergence of a so-called "New Intergovernmentalism," which reasserts the primacy of LI. Furthermore, Moravcsik's scholarship is criticized for never put forward a detailed liberal intergovernmentalist account of the powers of the European Court of Justice, although a (modified) liberal intergovernmentalist account of European legal integration is certainly possible.

== Sources ==
- Moravcsik, Andrew; Schimmelfennig, Frank (2009). "Liberal intergovernmentalism". In Wiener, Antje; Diez, Thomas (eds.). European integration theory (2nd ed.). Oxford University Press. pp. 67–87. ISBN 978-0-19-922609-2. OCLC 277068135.
