= Interfaith Alliance =

American advocacy organization

Interfaith Alliance is a national interfaith organization in the United States founded in 1994 to counteract the religious right. Its stated goal is to protect faith and freedom by respecting individual rights, preserving the boundaries between religion and government, and uniting diverse voices to protect democracy and to challenge extremism and build common ground.

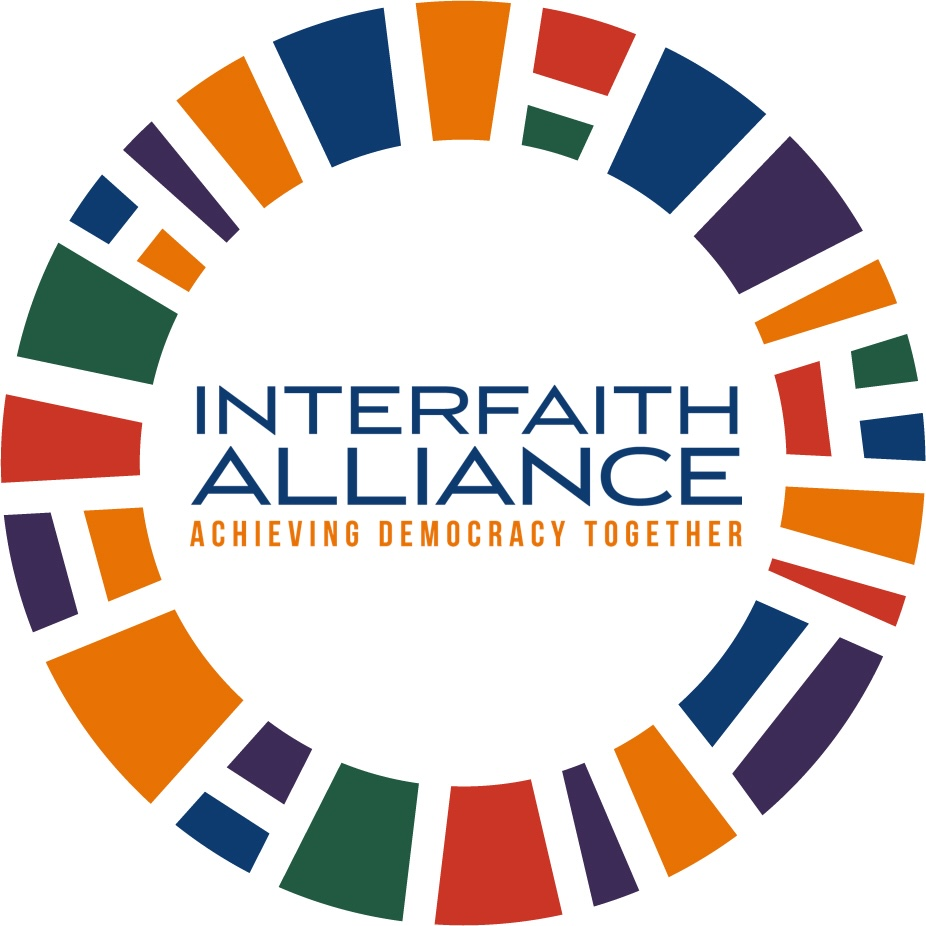
Interfaith Alliance logo

== Leadership ==
In July 2022, Paul Raushenbush, was named president and CEO of Interfaith Alliance. He succeeded Jack Moline, who had held the post since 2015, who previously had succeeded C. Welton Gaddy, who served as President Emeritus of the organization.

== Partner organizations ==
Interfaith Alliance and its partner organization, Interfaith Alliance Foundation, work out of their main office in Washington, D.C. The group has a network of over 30 chapters and affiliated organizations in states and cities across the country.

In 2025, Interfaith Alliance partnered with the American Library Association on “Faith for Libraries,” a campaign opposing book censorship and supporting libraries and librarians. The effort followed the groups’ 2024 creation of the Banned Books, Banned Beliefs resource on censorship and religious freedom.

== Views ==
Interfaith Alliance recognizes the powerful role that religion plays in America, and it values the positive impact that religious belief can have on American politics. However, Interfaith Alliance's concern is that religion and the United States government are becoming dangerously entangled. Interfaith Alliance believes that religion is being manipulated as a tool to influence policy and advance political strategy. It works to ensure the sanctity of religion and the integrity of politics. The group opposes all forms of discrimination and persecution on the basis of religion and supports the rights of LGBTQ+ Americans and religious minorities. It has warned against the Trump administration and other politicians advancing a “white Christian nationalist agenda.”

Interfaith Alliance opposed state-level legislation requiring public schools to display the Ten Commandments, including measures in Louisiana and Texas, arguing that such mandates threaten religious freedom and church-state separation.

== Programs and initiatives ==
In 2026, Interfaith Alliance and several other faith groups filed a lawsuit against the Trump Administration’s Religious Liberty Commission in the United States District Court for the Southern District of New York, charging that the commission’s almost exclusively Christian membership undermines religious freedom and violates the Federal Advisory Committee Act. Speaking to USA Today about the suit, CEO Rev. Paul Raushenbush said that the commission “does not reflect the diversity of American religion and the integrity of politics." The group "does not appear to be interested in truly standing up for religious freedom for all Americans."

In late 2025, Interfaith Alliance launched a “Choose Love, Not ICE” campaign, including a national advertising effort that framed opposition to immigration enforcement raids as a matter of upholding religious values and human dignity.

During the second Trump Administration, Interfaith Alliance has led the mobilization of clergy and faith communities for the national No Kings protests, hosting trainings in non-violent protest and connecting local faith leaders with protest organizers.

In June 2025, Interfaith Alliance and Democracy Forward submitted Freedom of Information Act requests and later sued for records related to the administration’s Task Force to Eradicate Anti-Christian Bias. Interfaith Alliance led a letter, signed by two dozen leaders and scholars, challenging the administration’s justification for the task force that there is rampant Christian persecution within the federal government.

In 2025, Interfaith Alliance joined more than 1,000 nonprofits and houses of worship in opposing efforts to weaken the U.S. Johnson Amendment, which bars tax-exempt organizations from endorsing political candidates.

Ahead of the 2024 U.S. presidential election, Interfaith Alliance organized the nonpartisan “Vote Is Sacred” bus tour across swing states to encourage voter participation and highlight the role of faith communities in pro-democracy activism.

The group has organized events for “Faith for Pride” as part of a nationwide effort to “de-escalate the actions of extremist anti-LGBTQ+ hate groups.” In 2025, the organization launched a “Recommit to Pride” campaign with other faith and LGBTQ+ organizations ahead of Pride Month. The campaign aimed to address the rise of anti-LGBTQ+ attacks from hate groups, elected officials, and discriminatory legislation, and call out corporations that backed out of support for Pride events.

In 2019, Interfaith Alliance joined with 42 other religious and allied organizations in issuing a statement opposing Project Blitz, an effort by a coalition of Christian right organizations to influence state legislation.
