= Wolfgang F. Danspeckgruber =

Austrian-born American academic (1956–2026)

Wolfgang Franz Danspeckgruber
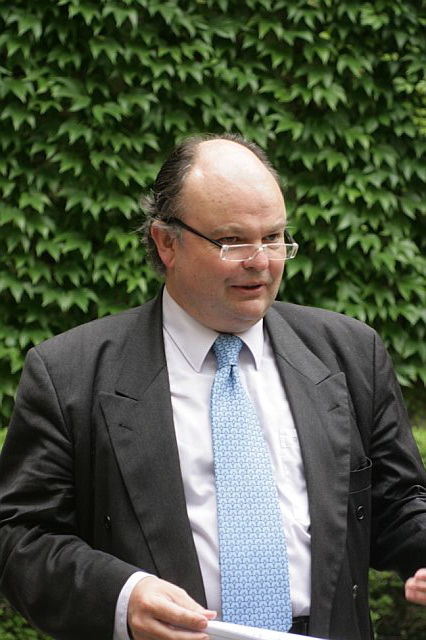
- Born: February 4, 1956; Linz, Austria
- Died: February 17, 2026 (aged 70); New York City, U.S.

Academic background
- Education: Johannes Kepler University of Linz, Austria; Graduate Institute of International and Development Studies, Geneva, Switzerland

Academic work
- Discipline: International Relations
- Institutions: Princeton University; Liechtenstein Institute on Self-Determination (LISD); Woodrow Wilson School of Public and International Affairs
- Main interests: Diplomacy, self-determination

Wolfgang Franz Danspeckgruber (February 4, 1956 – February 17, 2026) was an Austrian-born American academic who was the Founding Director of the Liechtenstein Institute on Self-Determination at Princeton University. He taught on issues of state, international security, self-determination, diplomacy and crisis diplomacy at Princeton's Woodrow Wilson School of Public and International Affairs and the Department of Politics from 1988. Danspeckgruber was also founder and chair of the Liechtenstein Colloquium on European and International Affairs, LCM, a private diplomacy forum.

== Early life and education ==
Danspeckgruber was educated at the Johannes Kepler University of Linz and the University of Vienna, Austria, (D.Laws); and at the Graduate Institute of International and Development Studies, Geneva, Switzerland (Ph.D.) where he studied under the supervision of Curt Gasteyger, and worked closely with Dusan Sidjanski at the University of Geneva.

Following his Austrian military service (First Lieutenant, Reserve), he served as Special Assistant to the Commander of the Austrian National Defense Academy. Danspeckgruber was a visiting scholar at the Fletcher School of Law and Diplomacy, and held research fellowships at the Belfer Center of Science and International Affairs at the John F. Kennedy School of Government at Harvard University, Recipient of Erwin Schroedinger Fellowship, and at Princeton's Center of International Studies where he worked closely with Robert Gilpin.

== Career ==
Wolfgang Danspeckgruber was instrumental in the creation of the Liechtenstein Institute on Self-Determination at Princeton University, LISD, in 2000, which has been endowed by Prince Hans-Adam II, Prince of Liechtenstein. He was interested in self-determination, security and stability in the wider Middle East, Caucasus, Afghanistan, and Central Asia; in theory and practice of international diplomacy; crisis- and private diplomacy, and negotiations, the International Criminal Court, ICC; as well as in issues concerning religion and diplomacy. In 2007 Danspeckgruber created the Program on Religion, Diplomacy, and International Relations, PORDIR, together with Paul Raushenbush.

During Austria's Membership in the United Nations Security Council (2008–10), Danspeckgruber served as adviser to its Permanent Mission in New York. He has also advised the Permanent Mission of Liechtenstein to the United Nations in New York and has worked with Ambassador Christian Wenaweser. In 2006, during Austria's Presidency of the European Union, he was the academic adviser to the Permanent Mission of Austria to the United Nations in New York.

In 1992 to 1999, Danspeckgruber was involved in private diplomacy in Southeastern Europe and has also worked with the Ahtisaari Team and the EU Special Representative on the status of Kosovo. Danspeckgruber has been studying Syria and searching for ways to establish peace and stability in the region. He has emphasized the necessity for a negotiated solution in the Syrian conflict to stop the fighting and radicalization, to protect women and children, and respect all beliefs and religions. Statement of the Holy See Meeting of Experts on Syria.

== Research ==
Danspeckgruber was interested in the analysis of international relations, self-determination, in the conduct of diplomacy, mediation, reconciliation, and the management of international crises – particularly also the role of perception, technology, religion and values. He worked to educate and train the next generation of leaders, men and women, in those dimensions.

Danspeckgruber co-taught graduate and undergraduate seminars on the European Union and international affairs with Jose Manuel Barroso; international crisis diplomacy with Joschka Fischer and also with Robert Finn; and on diplomacy and Afghanistan with Francesc Vendrell at the Woodrow Wilson School of Public and International Affairs. Danspeckgruber has also been teaching international relations and crisis diplomacy at the European Forum Alpbach, Austria.

Discussing contemporary variants of self-determination-crises, Danspeckgruber argues that "[t]here is a growing sense that self-determination and autonomy ought not necessarily and automatically cause the break up of sovereign states. Rather, at least in most cases, there is increasing interest in the introduction of self-governance - the maximization of autonomy - and further decentralization." "The Arab Spring, and many of the other intrastate crises we face today demonstrate the critical meaning of 'determining one's destiny'", Danspeckgruber in Joerg Fisch, The world divided, Self-Determination and the Right of Peoples to Self-Determination, Oldenbourg, 2011.

== Death ==
Danspeckgruber died in New York City on February 17, 2026, at the age of 70.

== Publications ==
Danspeckgruber's publications include "The Self-Determination of Peoples: Community, Nation, and State in an Interdependent World", and "Working Toward Peace and Prosperity in Afghanistan", Lynne Rienner Publishers; "Globalization - Reflections on Impact and Dichotomies" in Carl Baudenbacher, Erhard Busek, eds., "Aspekte der Globalisierung", 2008; "Self-Governance Plus Regional Integration: A Possible Solution to Self-Determination Claims" in Stefan Wolff and Marc Weller, eds. "Autonomy, Self-Governance, and Conflict Resolution", 2005; and "The EEA, the Neutrals, and an Emerging Architecture" in Gregory F. Treverton, ed. "The Shape of the New Europe", 1992.

He was the editor of the "LISD Summary Report" and the "LISD Policy Brief", the "LISD Study Series", and the "Encyclopedia Princetoniensis: The Princeton Encyclopedia of Self-Determination".

== Books ==
- Danspeckgruber, Wolfgang F., ed., "Robert Gilpin and International Relations: Reflections", Lynne Rienner Publishers, 2012.
- Danspeckgruber, Wolfgang F., ed., "Working Toward Peace and Prosperity in Afghanistan", Lynne Rienner Publishers, 2011.
- Danspeckgruber, Wolfgang F., Stefan Barriga and Christian Wenaweser, eds. "The Princeton Process on the Crime of Aggression: Materials of the Special Working Group on the Crime of Aggression, 2003-2009", Lynne Rienner Publishers, 2009.
- Danspeckgruber, Wolfgang F., with Robert Finn, eds. "Building State and Security in Afghanistan", with contributions by President Hamid Karzai and Hans Adam II, Prince of Liechtenstein, Princeton: Liechtenstein Institute on Self-Determination at Princeton University, Woodrow Wilson School of Public and International Affairs, 2007.
- Danspeckgruber, Wolfgang F., ed. "Perspectives on the Russian State in Transition". Princeton: Liechtenstein Institute on Self-Determination at Princeton University, Woodrow Wilson School of Public and International Affairs, 2006.
- Danspeckgruber, Wolfgang F., ed. "The Self-Determination of Peoples: Community, Nation, and State in an Interdependent World", Boulder, Colorado: Lynne Rienner Publishers, 2002.
- Danspeckgruber, Wolfgang F., with Arthur Watts, eds. "Self-Determination and Self-Administration: A Sourcebook", Foreword Hans Adam II, Prince of Liechtenstein, Boulder: Lynne Rienner Publishers, 1997.
- Danspeckgruber, Wolfgang F., with Charles R.H. Tripp, eds. "The Iraqi Aggression against Kuwait: Strategic Lessons and Implications for Europe". Boulder, Colorado: Westview Press, 1996.
- Danspeckgruber, Wolfgang F., ed. "Emerging Dimensions of European Security Policy". Boulder: Westview Press, 1991.
