= Brad Gooch =

American writer (born 1952)

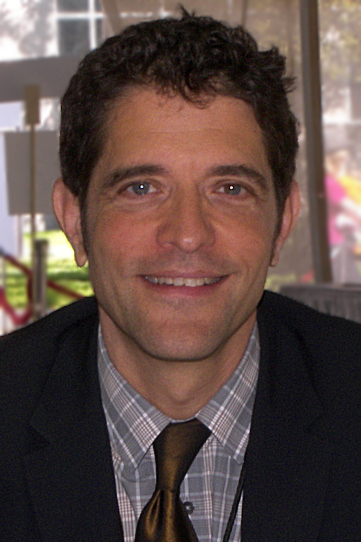
Brad Gooch at the 2009 Texas Book Festival.

Brad Gooch (born 1952) is an American writer.

== Biography ==
Born and raised in Kingston, Pennsylvania, he graduated from Columbia University with a bachelor's degree in 1973 and a doctorate in 1986.

Gooch has lived in New York City since 1971. His 2015 memoir Smash Cut recounts life in 1970s and 1980s New York City, including the time Gooch spent as a fashion model, life with his then-boyfriend filmmaker Howard Brookner, living in the famous Chelsea Hotel during the first decade of the AIDS crisis.

Gooch is married to writer and religious activist Paul Raushenbush; they have two children.

== Bibliography ==
=== Books ===
- The Daily News (1977) poetry
- Jailbait and Other Stories (1984) stories
- Hall And Oates (1985) biography
- Billy Idol (1986) biography
- Scary Kisses (1990) novel
- City Poet: The Life and Times of Frank O'Hara (1993) biography
- The Golden Age of Promiscuity (1996) novel
- Finding the Boyfriend Within (1999) self-help
- Zombie 00 (2000) novel
- Godtalk (2002) spiritual self-help
- Dating the Greek Gods: Empowering Spiritual Messages on Sex and Love, Creativity and Wisdom (2003) spiritual self-help
- Flannery : A Life of Flannery O'Connor (2009) biography
- Smash Cut: A Memoir of Howard & Art & the '70s & the '80s (2015) memoir
- Rumi's Secret: The Life of the Sufi Poet of Love (2017) biography
- Radiant: The Life and Line of Keith Haring (2024) biography

=== Essays, reporting and other contributions ===
- (essay in) Boys Like Us: Gay Writers Tell Their Coming Out Stories, Patrick Merla (ed.) Avon Books. 1996

=== Critical studies and reviews ===
- O'Neill, Joseph (Jun 2009). "Touched by evil". The Atlantic. 303 (5): 88–96. Review of Flannery.

== Critical reception ==
His book Jailbait and Other Stories was selected by Donald Barthelme for a Pushcart Foundation Writer's Choice Award. His writing has appeared in the Paris Review, Partisan Review, Bomb, the New Republic, Harper's Bazaar, The New Yorker, Vanity Fair, Out, New York, the Los Angeles Times Book Review, The Nation, Travel + Leisure, and American Poetry Review.

His most acclaimed work is a biography of the poet Frank O'Hara, City Poet. His book, Finding the Boyfriend Within, calls for gay men to cultivate self-respect by cultivating an imaginary lover.
