= Beth El Hebrew Congregation =

Reform synagogue in Alexandria, Virginia, US

- Location within Virginia

Religion
- Affiliation: Reform Judaism
- Ecclesiastical or organizational status: Synagogue
- Leadership: Rabbi David Spinrad; Rabbi Brett Isserow (Emeritus)
- Status: Active

Location
- Location: Alexandria, Virginia
- Country: United States
- Interactive map of Beth El Hebrew Congregation
- Coordinates: 38°49′14″N 77°05′47″W

Architecture
- Established: 1859 (as a congregation)
- Groundbreaking: 1956
- Completed: 1957

Website
- bethelhebrew.org

Beth El Hebrew Congregation is a Reform Jewish synagogue located in Alexandria, Virginia, in the United States. Established on September 4, 1859, it is oldest active congregation in the Northern Virginia region.

Beth El is an egalitarian synagogue providing worship in the Reform tradition and is a founding member of the Union for Reform Judaism. Beth El's aims to provide a safe, supportive environment that allows all individuals to continue their spiritual journeys through exploration, education, and participation. Beth El is dedicated to bringing wholeness and healing to members of the congregation and the community as a whole.

== Clergy and leadership ==
Beth El's clergy consists of Rabbi David Spinrad and Cantor Jason Kaufman. Brett Isserow serves as Rabbi Emeritus.

Alan J. Cohn is the president of the board of directors. Liz Bayer serves as executive director.

== Religious programs and activities ==
Beth El holds religious services for Shabbat and Jewish holidays.

The Beth El Early Childhood Learning Center offers a Jewish preschool program. Beth El's religious school offers a religious curriculum to students in kindergarten through tenth grade.

For adults, Beth El hosts religious study groups, Torah study groups, and classes to learn Hebrew.

Beth El's social action projects include conducting food drives, collecting baby items for victims of domestic violence, supporting a social service safety net for those in need, and serving food to residents at a local shelter.

== History ==
=== Early history ===
The congregation was established by approximately forty Jewish families living in Alexandria, Virginia, on September 4, 1859. The congregation went by the name Beth El Hebrew Congregation or the alternative name of Hebrew Congregation of Alexandria. For the High Holy Days of 1859, the congregation held separate services for those wishing to worship in the Orthodox tradition and those preferring a more liberal tradition. The two groups decided to worship together beginning in the following year's High Holy Days. Services were conducted in Hebrew with accompaniment from a choir and an organ. Services were held either in a rented space in the Young Men's Christian Association or in a congregant's home.

By the 1860s, Beth El worshiped at a rented space in Stewart's Hall at the northeast corner of King and Pitt streets. During this period, some of Beth El's services were led by ordained rabbis, while others were led by lay leaders. By 1867, Beth El finally had a permanent rabbi, Dr. Leopold Lowensohn.

=== First synagogue ===
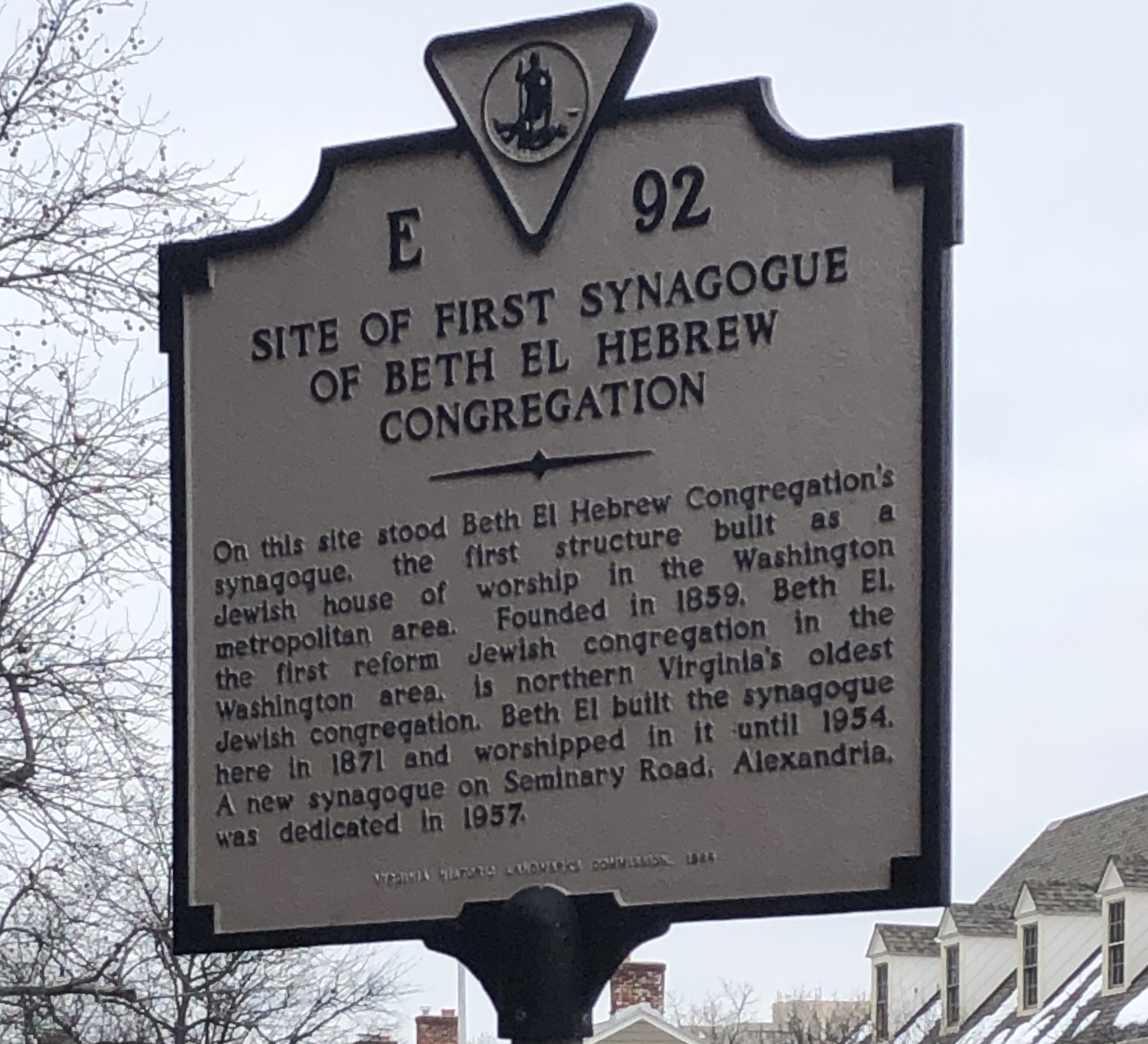
Beth El Hebrew Congregation historical marker on Washington Street, site of the congregation's first building.

Beth El held a Purim ball on March 8, 1871, in order to raise funds to construct a synagogue building. The next month, Beth El's leaders decided to build the synagogue on land located on Washington Street, just north of Cameron Street. Construction began on June 26, and the building was completed by August 1871. Dedication and the first Shabbat services were held on September 1, 1871. The second floor served as the sanctuary, while the first floor was used for social purposes and the religious school. Three years later, Beth El purchased the land on which the synagogue was built from its owner, partially from funds raised from selling pews to twenty of its families.

In 1873, Rabbi Lowensohn left Beth El, and he was replaced by Rabbi A.A. Bonnheim. A year later, several members accused Bonnheim of unbecoming conduct. After some deliberation, the majority of the membership gave a vote of confidence to the rabbi, and at least four families resigned in disgust and formed their own congregation. The families rejoined Beth El two years later when Bonnheim left Beth El.

Following Bonnheim's departure, Beth El did not have another rabbi who stayed with the congregation for more than two consecutive years for several decades.

=== First schism ===
In 1914, a group of Beth El's members who were new immigrants from Eastern Europe decided they preferred Conservative Judaism to Reform Judaism. The group left Beth El and established Agudas Achim Congregation. Despite the split, the two congregations remained on cordial terms.

=== 1930s and 1940s ===
Six days after Kristallnacht, Beth El's members convened in a special meeting. Benedict Weil, Beth El's president, proposed that Beth El hire Rabbi Hugo B. Schiff of Karlsruhe, Germany, as its permanent rabbi. Schiff had been known in Northern Virginia for his work with Rabbi Ulrich Steuer of Fredericksburg, Virginia's reform congregation. A graduate of the Jewish Theological Seminary of Breslau and Erlangen University, Schiff had been the spiritual leader of a congregation of 1,000 members in Germany and a member of the Great Synagogue Council of Baden. Rabbi Schiff had been imprisoned at the Dachau Concentration Camp. Because Schiff would enter the United States on a religious visa, the visa would be relatively simple to obtain, and otherwise restrictive visa quotas would not apply.

Beth El's members enthusiastically approved the proposal. Schiff came to Beth El as its rabbi on April 18, 1939, bringing with him a Torah that had been rescued from Karlsruhe's destroyed synagogue. Virtually all Jewish residents of Karlsruhe who remained in the city were murdered in the Holocaust.

Schiff expanded Shabbat services, reintroduced Bar Mitzvah and Confirmation ceremonies, hosted congregational Passover seders, organized an adult study group, and held lectures about the history of Jewish people. The interior and exterior of the synagogue were refurbished. Under Schiff's leadership, Beth El's membership quadrupled within nine years.

In 1941, Schiff became rabbi of the Arlington–Fairfax Jewish Center (since renamed Etz Hayim) on a part-time basis, which Beth El approved. Schiff also served as the rabbi of the Washington Hebrew Congregation during the summer months. Schiff became a professor of religion at Howard University in 1945.

Schiff resigned from Beth El on July 1, 1948, in order to become a full-time assistant rabbi at Washington Hebrew Congregation.

=== Rabbi Helfgott ===
C. Melvyn Helfgott, a newly ordained rabbi from Hebrew Union College, became Beth El's religious leader in 1949.

Instead of a conventional sermon during Shabbat services, Rabbi Helfgott moderated a series of adult discussions on Judaism. Shabbat morning services became more family-oriented. A youth group was formed. An adult-discussion group convened each Sunday morning. Helfgott formed a Jewish study group for young married adults.

Helfgott led Beth El until May 1953. Rabbi Emmet A. Frank became Beth El's spiritual leader in April 1954. A graduate of the University of Houston and Hebrew Union College, Cincinnati, Frank had served as assistant rabbi for a congregation in Houston before joining Beth El.

=== New facility ===
Because Beth El's membership quadrupled in size during the 1950s, the congregation began to consider moving to a larger location. By 1952, Beth El held additional High Holy Day services at a nearby church, and Beth El did the same for Shabbat services by 1955. By 1955, Beth El held an additional Shabbat service at a nearby Baptist church. The religious school's enrollment had also increased similarly, and Beth El had begun to rent space at local school buildings.

In 1955, Beth El purchased a wooded 5.5-acre (22,000 m^{2}) piece of land on Seminary Road for $42,500. Beth El sold its synagogue for $25,000.

Plans for the new synagogue included a 440-seat sanctuary, a social hall large enough for 460 people, and 22 classrooms for the religious school. A fundraising campaign paid for some of the costs, and a mortgage paid for the remainder. Groundbreaking began on May 26, 1956. and the cornerstone was laid on February 10, 1957. The building was formally dedicated on September 13, 1957.

=== Advocacy of school desegregation ===
In 1954, the United States Supreme Court held in the case of Brown v. Board of Education that laws requiring students to attend different public schools based on their race is unconstitutional because separate facilities are inherently unequal. In response Senator Harry F. Byrd Sr. organized the Massive Resistance movement to close public schools rather than desegregate them.

In 1958, Rabbi Frank criticized Byrd's massive resistance movement in his sermon during Kol Nidre services.

Segregationists in Virginia were quick to denounce Frank's sermon. Newspapers in southern Virginia, Washington, and New York criticized the sermon, and Frank received multiple threatening phone calls. while many rabbis and Christian churches in Metropolitan Washington supported Frank.

A few weeks later, Frank was invited to speak about Judaism at Arlington Unitarian Church. Due to a bomb threat; the church was evacuated and the speech was canceled.

Frank said he would return to speak at the church the following Sunday because "I have a lot to say and I don't run that easy." Frank said the bomb threat was the work "of a group of cowards who are afraid to come out into the daylight." People from around the country mailed letters to Beth El in support of Rabbi Frank.

At Frank's next sermon, he said that a "Jew who remains silent in the face of prejudice leveled at another group of God's children is traitorous to the basic principle of Judaism." Referring to the people who violently supported segregation, he pointed to the Jewish concept of repentance and forgiveness, saying, "no man should be so merciless that he will not forgive even the most sordid actions of men."

Frank returned to speak at the church the next Sunday. In the audience was George Lincoln Rockwell, a neo-Nazi leader. On the church's lawn before his speech, Frank introduced himself to Rockwell and welcomed him to hear his speech. When Rockwell proposed that he meet with Frank later to clear up some misunderstandings, Frank agreed to do so.

=== Centennial ===
Beth El marked its centennial with a three-day celebration in March 1960.

=== Second schism ===
On January 11, 1962, the Jewish Community Council stated it opposed public schools having celebrations of religious holidays such as Christmas. In response, Frank wrote a letter to the editor of The Washington Post saying there was nothing wrong with a public school having a celebration of Christmas together with a celebration of Hanukkah. Frank wrote that such religious holiday celebrations were a way to teach children to respect others' religion. (Note: On June 25, 1962, in the case of Engel v. Vitale, the United States Supreme Court ruled that it is unconstitutional for state officials to compose an official school prayer and encourage its recitation in public schools. On June 17, 1962, in the case of Abington School District v. Schempp, the U.S. Supreme Court ruled that school-sponsored reading of Biblical verses in public schools is unconstitutional.)

Many of Beth El's congregants were unhappy with Frank's letter. Opposition to the rabbi and lay leadership at Beth El resulted in 43 families leaving and forming in new congregation, Temple Rodef Shalom in Falls Church in 1962.

Frank left Beth El in 1969 after accepting a position at Temple De Hirsch, a Reform congregation in Seattle. Frank said he was proud of always speaking from his heart about what he believed to be true. He was replaced by Rabbi Arnold G. Fink, an 11th-generation rabbi who graduated from Princeton University and Hebrew Union College.

=== Expansion ===
By the mid-1960s, Beth El's synagogue was no longer large enough, particularly for its religious school, which had become overcrowded. A committee's proposal to expand the synagogue building included a larger social hall, additional classrooms, and a room for youth groups. The expansion plan was approved in 1967.

Beth El's membership continued to grow through the early 1980s. With more of its families consisting of two parents with full-time careers and raising a family, fewer members were available to volunteer, and Beth El began to hiring employees to do the work that volunteers had always done.

Due to the growing number of congregants, Beth El's rabbi, Rabbi Arnold G. Fink, found he was stretched too thin. Rabbi Amy Perlin became Beth El's first Assistant Rabbi in the summer of 1982.

After 33 years of service, Rabbi Fink retired in 2002, becoming rabbi emeritus. The Beth El Learning Center was named in his honor. Rabbi Brett R. Isserow was named Beth El's senior rabbi. A native of Johannesburg, Rabbi Isserow studied at the University of Witwatersrand and Hebrew Union College's Jewish Institute of Religion in Cincinnati. He came to Beth El after serving as associate rabbi at Hebrew Benevolent Congregation in Atlanta.

In 2017, Isserow announced his retirement, and Rabbi David Spinrad was selected as his replacement, while Isserow would remain on in the role of rabbi emeritus. Spinrad also served at Hebrew Benevolent Congregation in Atlanta before beginning his tenure at Beth El in July 2018.
