= Edith A. Moravcsik =

American linguist (born 1939)

Edith Moravcsik
- Born: May 2, 1939 (age 87); Budapest, Hungary
- Citizenship: American
- Education: Indiana University Bloomington (PhD)
- Known for: Moravcsik universals of borrowing
- Parent: Gyula Moravcsik

Edith Andrea Moravcsik (Hungarian pronunciation: [edit moravt͡ʃik]) (born 2 May 1939) is a Hungarian-born American linguist.

== Career ==
Edith Andrea Moravcsik was born May 2, 1939, in Budapest, Hungary as the daughter of Gyula Moravcsik. Julius Moravcsik and Michael Moravcsik were her brothers. Since 1964, she has been living in the United States. Her early training in Hungary was in Classics.

=== Education and teaching ===
In 1971, she received her Doctor of Philosophy in linguistics at Indiana University Bloomington. Between 1968 and 1976, she was a member of the Language Universals Project at Stanford University under the direction of Joseph Greenberg and Charles Ferguson. After over 30 years of teaching at the University of Wisconsin-Milwaukee, she retired from this institution as professor emeritus in 2009. She was elected an external member of the Hungarian Academy of Sciences in 2019.

== Books authored ==
- Introducing language typology. 2013. Cambridge University Press.
- An introduction to syntax. Fundamentals of syntactic analysis. 2016. London: Continuum.
- An introduction to syntactic theory. 2016. London: Continuum.

== Recent books co-edited ==
- Current approaches to syntax (with András Kertész and Csilla Rákosi). 2019. Berlin: de Gruyter.
- Competing motivations in grammar (with Brian MacWhinney and Andrej Malchukov). 2014. Oxford University Press.
- Formulaic language (with Roberta Corrigan, Hamid Ouali, and Kathleen Wheatley). Volumes I-II. 2009. Amsterdam/Philadelphia: Benjamins.

== Selected papers ==
- 2019. "Accounting for variation in language." Open Linguistics, 2019, 5: pages 369–382.
- 2017. "Syntax." In Hans Burkhardt & Johanna Seibt & Guido Imaguire & Stamatios Gerogiorgakis (eds.) The handbook of mereology, pages 544–547. 2017. Munich: Philosophia Verlag.
- 2017. "Number" In A. Y. Aikhenvald and R. M. W. Dixon (eds.) The Cambridge Handbook of Linguistic Typology. 2017. pages 440–476. Cambridge University Press.
- 2016. “On linguistic categories.” Linguistic Typology 2016. 20/2, pages 417-425.
- 2011. "Coming to grips with exceptions". In Horst J. Simon and Heike Wiese (eds.) Expecting the unexpected: Exceptions in grammar. 2011. pages 31–55. Berlin: Mouton de Gruyter.
- 2011. "Explaining language universals". In Jae Jung Song (ed.) The Oxford handbook of language typology. 2011. pages 69–89. Oxford University Press.
- 2010. "Conflict resolution in syntactic theory." Studies in Language, 2010. 34:3, pages 636–669.
- 2009. "The distribution of case". In: Andrej Malchukov and Andrew Spencer (eds.) The Oxford handbook of case. 2009. pages 231–245. Oxford University Press.
- 2009. "Partonomic structures in syntax." In Vyvyan Evans and Stéphanie Pourcel (eds.) New directions in cognitive linguistics. 2009. pages 269–285. Amsterdam/Philadelphia: Benjamins.
- 2007. “What is universal about typology?” Linguistic Typology, 2007. 11/1, pages 27–41.
- 2003. “A semantic analysis of associative plurals” Studies in Language, 2003, 27:3, pages 469–503.
- 1978. "Agreement." In: Universals of human language, edited by Joseph H. Greenberg, Charles A. Ferguson, and Edith Moravcsik, Stanford: Stanford University Press, pages 331–374.
- 1978. "On the case marking of objects." In: Universals of human language, edited by Joseph H. Greenberg, Charles A. Ferguson, and Edith Moravcsik, Stanford: Stanford University Press, pages 249–289.
