= Arthur Watts (barrister) =

British lawyer and diplomat

Sir Arthur Watts, KCMG, QC (14 November 1931 – 16 November 2007) was an international lawyer, diplomat and arbitrator. He was employed as a legal adviser at the Foreign Office between 1956 and 1991 being appointed the Chief Legal Adviser to the Foreign Office from 1987 to 1991.

Arthur Watts was educated at Haileybury and the Royal Military Academy, Sandhurst. He read Economics and Law at Downing College, Cambridge. He was called to the Bar by Gray's Inn in 1956, while a junior legal adviser at the Foreign Office. Over the period of some 45 years he served on many British negotiating teams abroad, dealing with a host of matters from Antarctic mineral resources to human rights.

As part of his role, in 1973, when Britain had just joined the European Economic Community, he spent four years helping to establish the framework for Britain's relations with the various community bodies in Brussels.

Following the disintegration of Yugoslavia in the 1990s Watts became the mediator between the newly established republics as they sought to agree on how to share out the assets, and meet the liabilities, of the old Yugoslavia (1996–2001).

He was a notable legal scholar and published a number of books including Oppenheim's International Law (volume one, 9th edition, with Sir Robert Jennings, 1992), which remains the undisputed authority in the field. He also published Legal Effects of War (4th edition, with Lord McNair, 1966); Encyclopaedic Dictionary of International Law (with C and A Parry and J Grant, 1986); International Law and the Antarctic Treaty System (1992); Self-Determination and Self-Administration, (with Wolfgang Danspeckgruber, 1997); and The International Law Commission 1949–1998 (three volumes, 1999–2000). He was president of the British branch of the International Law Association from 1992 to 1998. In 1995 Sir Arthur joined the advisory board of the Liechtenstein Research Program on Self-Determination, Princeton University. In 1997 he was elected a member of the Institut de Droit International. In 2000 he became a founding member of the Board of Advisors to the Liechtenstein Institute on Self-Determination at Princeton University, LISD, at the Woodrow Wilson School of Public and International Affairs.
