= Princeton Institute for International and Regional Studies =

Researc center in Princeton, New Jersey, US

Coordinates: 40.35015°N 74.65657°W

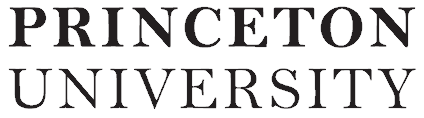
- Type: Private
- Established: 1951; reorganized in 2003
- Parent institution: Princeton University
- Director: Deborah J. Yashar
- Location: Princeton, New Jersey, United States
- Website: piirs.princeton.edu

The Princeton Institute for International and Regional Studies (PIIRS) is the main research center for international studies and area studies at Princeton University and is one of the oldest centers of its kind in the United States. The Institute focuses on an interdisciplinary approach and its associated faculty is drawn from more than 150 professors and other scholars from more than 25 different departments within Princeton. Its director is political scientist Deborah J. Yashar, the Donald E. Stokes Professor of Public and International Affairs.

== History ==
In December 2001, a group of faculty members and administrators began discussions on how to re-evaluate the various international studies programs at the university. The committee recommended the formation of an institute, which was approved by May 19, 2002. The Institute was formed in 2003 as the result of a merger between the Center of International Studies, a research center that had existed since 1951, and the Council on Regional Studies, which had been an interdepartmental organization of regional study programs. University President Shirley M. Tilghman said that, "This new institute will build on two long-established areas of strength at Princeton to bring an even greater global perspective to teaching and research at this University". The Institute focuses on collaborative, interdisciplinary research, as well as issues of global importance. In the first academic year of 2003-04, approximately 150 graduate students were awarded grants to assist them with their research and dissertations. The first director of the new Institute was Latin American studies scholar Miguel A. Centeno. Today, the Institute maintains close ties with the Princeton School of Public and International Affairs and a number of university departments.

== Programs ==
=== Centers, Programs, and Research Networks ===
The Institute is home to a number of centers, programs, and research networks, including:

- M.S. Chadha Center for Global India
- Paul and Marcia Wythes Center on Contemporary China
- Fung Global Fellows Program
- Brazil Lab
- Cuba Research Network
- Global History Lab
- Global Systemic Risk
- Mobilizing Development Finance for Fragile States
- Princeton African Humanities Colloquium
- Reimagining World Order

Anchored by undergraduate certificates that offer immersion in international politics, culture, language study, and translation, PIIRS programs promote regionally targeted studies at Princeton:

- Program in African Studies
- Program in Contemporary European Politics and Society
- Program in Russian, East European and Eurasian Studies
- Program in South Asian Studies
- Program in Translation and Intercultural Communication

=== Seminars ===
In 2007, the Institute, in collaboration with Princeton's Office of International Programs, launched the Global Seminars program. Led by Princeton faculty, these seminars allow students to travel to one of seven locations around the world for a summer experiential-learning course. To date, more than 800 students have participated in seminars in Africa, East Asia, South Asia, Europe, the Near East, and South America. Seminars in Summer 2023 include courses in Austria, Chile, Greece, India, Japan, Kenya, and Morocco.

=== Fellowships ===
Undergraduate Fellows were designed for students in their junior year who are interested in conducting summer research abroad for their senior thesis. Up to ten juniors per year are selected through a competitive application process. Successful applicants are awarded funding to meet the entirety of their travel expenses and other potential costs.

The Institute also supports graduate students who require advanced language training or access to specific archives abroad for their dissertation. PIIRS provides dissertation completion fellowships for advanced graduate students whose dissertations are framed in terms of international or regional studies (broadly defined). Students who receive fellowships participate in a community of dissertation writers that is centered on a weekly interdisciplinary seminar. PIIRS awards up to 20 dissertation writing grants annually for either a semester or the full academic year to students who have reached Dissertation Completion Enrollment (DCE) status. Full-year grants are awarded for the academic year (August to May), and the stipend rate is equal to 10 months of the University Fellowship. Half-year grants are awarded for 5 months, and the stipend rate is equal to 5 months of the University Fellowship. Graduate students who receive dissertation writing grants will be appointed as PIIRS Graduate Fellows. PIIRS also welcomes applications for pre-dissertation and dissertation research to be conducted during the winter recess in the following areas: preliminary archival reconnaissance, field-site investigations, interviews, securing official permission for research sites, and other activities that will ensure a successful dissertation.

The Fung Global Fellowship is a prestigious, research-oriented program for early-career faculty who are interested in coming to Princeton for an academic year. The program is funded by a $10 million gift from Princeton alumnus William Fung with the aim of engage scholars around the world. Scholars are eligible must hold a Ph.D. or equivalent in a relevant research field and must hold a research position outside the United States.

=== World Politics ===
The Institute sponsors the World Politics journal. Founded in 1948, World Politics is an internationally renowned quarterly journal of political science published by Johns Hopkins University Press and produced under the editorial sponsorship of PIIRS. The editors invite submission of analytical/theoretical articles, review articles, and research notes bearing on problems in international relations and comparative politics. The journal does not publish strictly historical material, articles on current affairs, policy pieces or narratives of a journalistic nature. Articles submitted for consideration are unsolicited, except for review articles, which are usually commissioned. The journal is published in both print and online versions.
