= Agudas Achim Congregation (Alexandria, Virginia) =

Jewish religious institution

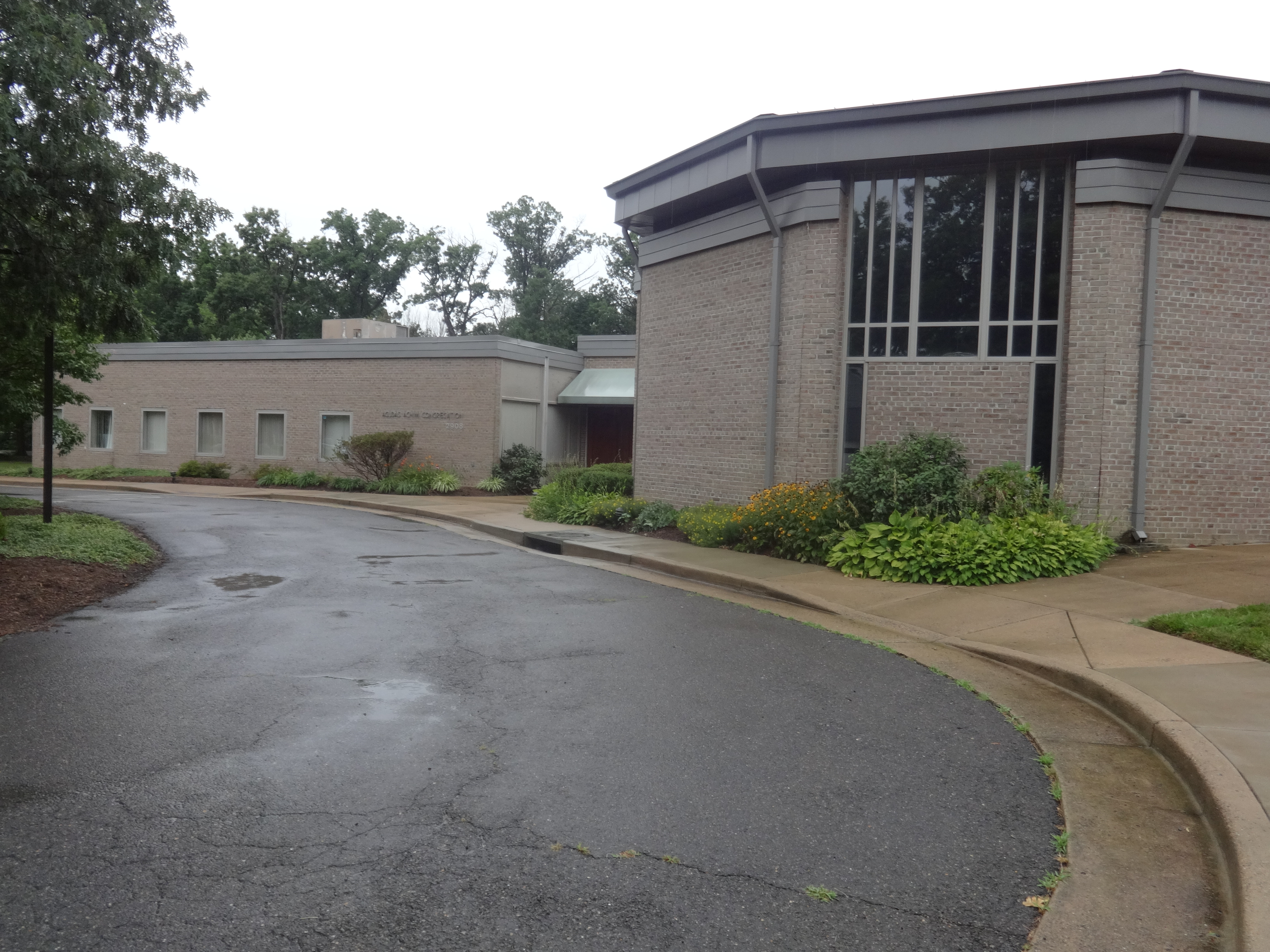
- Agudas Achim Congregation

- Location in Virginia

Religion
- Affiliation: Conservative Judaism
- Ecclesiastical or organisational status: Synagogue
- Leadership: Rabbi Steven Rein
- Status: Active

Location
- Location: 2908 Valley Drive, Alexandria, Virginia
- Country: United States
- Administration: United Synagogue of Conservative Judaism
- Coordinates: 38°49′50.15″N 77°4′47.35″W

Architecture
- Architect: Joseph Miller
- Type: Synagogue
- Established: 1914 (as a congregation)
- Completed: 1963

Website
- www.agudasachim-va.org

Agudas Achim Congregation is an egalitarian Conservative synagogue located at 2908 Valley Drive in the North Ridge neighborhood of Alexandria, Virginia, in the United States. The synagogue was founded in 1914, and its cemetery was founded in 1933.

== History ==
In 1914, new Eastern European immigrants who were members of Beth El Hebrew Congregation did not like Beth El's classical Reform. The group left Beth El and established Agudas Achim Congregation.

In 1927, the congregation acquired a large Italianate building at 508 Wolfe Street, built around 1850, for the synagogue. In 1946, the synagogue sold the building to a post of the Veterans of Foreign Wars.

In 1958, the synagogue's president, Murray J. Goldberg, joined other Virginia Jewish leaders in backing freedom of speech for rabbis. They spoke out after Jews in the Southern U.S. were threatened for supporting civil rights for African-Americans and after the bombing of the Hebrew Benevolent Congregation Temple in Atlanta.

A new synagogue building was dedicated on December 30, 1963, with President Lyndon B. Johnson as a speaker. The new building was designed by Joseph Miller.

In 1982, Gesher Jewish Day School of Northern Virginia opened as a kindergarten at Agudas Achim Congregation. It relocated to larger quarters in 1994, after outgrowing its space.

In 1985, Agudas Achim Congregation and Reform Beth El Hebrew Congregation co-founded a pre-school named Keshet Child Development Center. The synagogue took an active role, sitting on the school board. In 2001, however, Agudas Achim withdrew because of issues regarding non-Jewish lay leadership at the pre-school. The synagogue's rabbi said: "Our congregational charter did not permit the representation by non-Jews, and Keshet's experience was that some of the best leaders were the non-Jewish parents," the synagogue's rabbi Jack Moline said.

On September 21, 2004, Representative Tom Davis of Virginia commemorated the 90th anniversary of the synagogue in the United States House of Representatives.

In 2005, Agudas Achim Congregation opened a start-up Preschool for the Performing Arts for children ages two to four. The synagogue ended its relationship with the school three months later by mutual consent, as a result of different visions as to how to run the school. The synagogue's president said that he wanted the preschool to be integrated better into the synagogue, with regard to programming and a summer camp program. That same year, the school received a $38,165 grant from the federal government in homeland security funds approved by Congress to "harden targets" at its facility, which it used to purchase security equipment. The synagogue's rabbi, hazzan, and religious school director regularly participate with the children.

In 2006, Agudas Achim Congregation changed the time that its Friday night services began from 8 PM to 6:30 PM, to increase the number of its congregants attending the services. According to Mirza Lopez, its executive director, early results were encouraging. At the same time, its Saturday morning services were typically attracting 250 congregants.

In 2006–07 Agudas Achim served as the temporary home of the Westminster Presbyterian Church of Alexandria during the church's renovations. In a sermon in 2007, Senior Pastor Dr. Larry R. Hayward of the church said that the synagogue's rabbi had told him that when the church performed its renovation: "not only would we be welcome at Agudas Achim, but we would probably cause great collective disappointment to their congregation if we did not worship here." He reminisced that in 2006, the rabbi and several members of the synagogue joined church members at the church, to process to the synagogue, and that: "Then, when a hundred or more of their members formed a line outside their door and welcomed us with handshakes and applause, we were overwhelmed. There wasn't a dry eye on the sidewalk".

== Membership and dues ==
The synagogue has about 550 member units. Rahm Emanuel and his family attended this congregation while he worked in the White House. In 2008, as a financial incentive to attract congregants, the synagogue offered newlyweds dues of $500, and full-time students younger than 30 a dues price of $180.

== Clergy ==
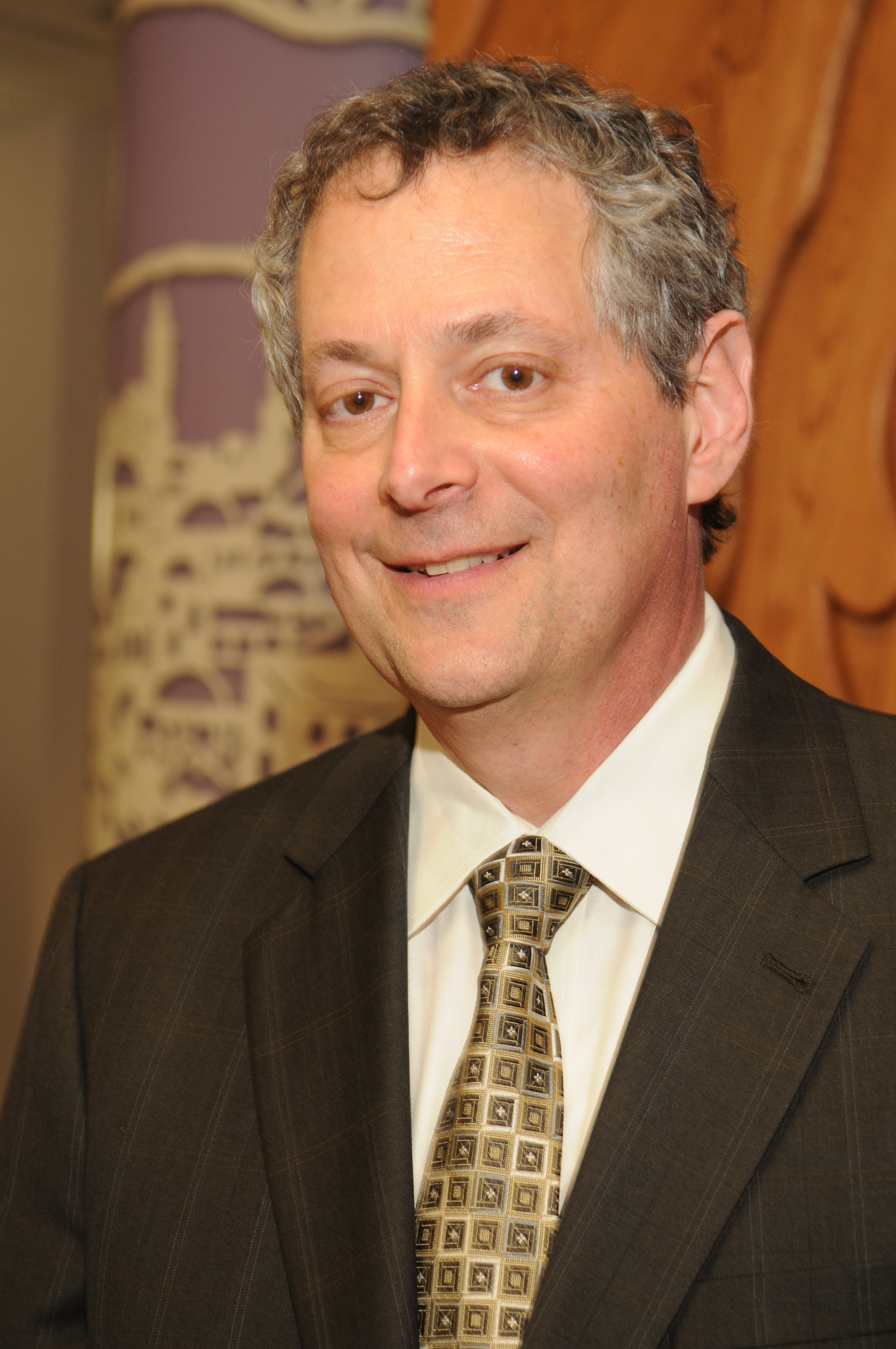
Rabbi Jack Moline, rabbi of Agudas Achim Congregation since 1987

The current rabbi of Agudas Achim, Steven I. Rein, joined the congregation in 2014. Originally from Fairfield, New Jersey, Rabbi Rein received his rabbinic ordination from the Jewish Theological Seminary where he also earned an M.A. in Talmud and Rabbinics from the Graduate School at JTS. Prior to joining Agudas Achim Congregation, Rabbi Rein served five years as the assistant rabbi of Park Avenue Synagogue in Manhattan.

Outside of his synagogue responsibilities, Rabbi Rein is a major and a reserve chaplain in the United States Air Force.

The previous rabbi is Jack Moline, who was the synagogue's rabbi from 1987 to 2014. Rabbi Moline was named by Newsweek magazine as one of the 50 most influential rabbis in America, placing 26th on the list. The synagogue's executive director notes the popularity of Moline's Saturday morning dvar Torah. The rabbi was noted by The New York Times for praising Inglourious Basterds and its portrayal of Jews.

Rabbi Theodore Steinberg was rabbi of the synagogue in the late 1950s and early 1960s. Rabbi Sheldon Elster became the synagogue's rabbi in 1968.

== Agudas Achim Congregation Cemetery ==
The Agudas Achim Congregation Cemetery, founded in January 1933 after the synagogue purchased the property from the City of Alexandria on November 30, 1932, at a "spirited" auction for $250 ($5,900 today), is located on Jefferson Street in Alexandria. A section that has become a "Meditation Garden" was added by the City Council in November 1943, for the use of the synagogue, "so long as the premises is used, kept and maintained by said religious congregation as a cemetery chapel without any manner of excavation."
