= World Politics =

- Discipline: Political science, international relations
- Language: English
- Edited by: Grigore Pop-Eleches

Publication details
- History: 1948–present
- Publisher: Johns Hopkins University Press on behalf of the Princeton Institute for International and Regional Studies
- Frequency: Quarterly
- Impact factor: 3.025 (2017)

Standard abbreviations
- ISO 4: World Polit.

Indexing
- ISSN: 0043-8871
- LCCN: 50003829
- OCLC no.: 33895557

Links
- Journal homepage; Online access; Online archive; Journal at Princeton

World Politics is a quarterly peer-reviewed academic journal covering political science and international relations. It is published by Johns Hopkins University Press on behalf of the Princeton Institute for International and Regional Studies. Before 2003, it was sponsored by Princeton's Center of International Studies and before 1951, by the Yale Institute of International Studies. It was established in 1948. The chair of the editorial committee is Grigore Pop-Eleches (Princeton University).

It is one of the leading journals in International Relations and Comparative Politics. According to the Journal Citation Reports, it has a 2023 impact factor of 4.5, ranking it 4th out of 165 journals in the category "International Relations" and 15th out of 317 in the category "Political Science".
