= Deborah J. Yashar =

American political scientist (born 1963)

- Born: 1963 (age 62–63)

Academic background
- Education: Brown University (B.A., 1985); University of California, Berkeley (M.A., 1986; PhD, 1992)
- Thesis: Demanding democracy: reform and reaction in Costa Rica and Guatemala, 1870s-1950s (1992)

Academic work
- Discipline: Politics
- Institutions: Harvard University; Princeton School of Public and International Affairs
- Website: scholar.princeton.edu/yashar/home

Deborah Jane Yashar (born 1963) is an American political scientist. She is a full professor of politics and international affairs at the Princeton School of Public and International Affairs. Her research interests involve politics of children and immigration in the Americas.

== Early life and education ==
Yashar was born in 1963 to parents of Iranian and Ukrainian descent. She earned her Bachelor of Arts from Brown University and her master's degree and PhD from the University of California, Berkeley. She received a Fulbright Fellowship to conduct dissertation research in Guatemala.

== Career ==
After earning her PhD, Yashar became a junior faculty member in Harvard's Department of Government and Committee on Degrees in Social Studies. In 1996, she became a fellow at the Kellogg Institute For International Studies at University of Notre Dame. She also republished her dissertation, Demanding Democracy: Reform and Reaction in Costa Rica and Guatemala, 1870s-1950s, through the Stanford University Press. Two years later, she accepted an assistant professor position at the Woodrow Wilson School of Public and International Affairs.

In 2005, Yashar published Contesting Citizenship in Latin America: The Rise of Indigenous Movements and the Postliberal Challenge through the Cambridge University Press, which examined how Latin American Indigenous populations have mobilized. The book earned her the 2006 New England Council on Latin American Studies Best Book Award. A few years later, she was promoted to full professor of politics and international affairs. In 2009, Yashar, Atul Kohli, and Miguel Centeno received a grant from the Princeton Global Collaborative Research Fund for their research project "State-Building in the Developing World." She also co-edited Parties Movements and Democracy in the Developing World and Routledge Handbook of Latin American Politics.

In 2018, she published Homicidal Ecologies: Illicit Economies and Complicit States in Latin America, a book which focuses on the high and uneven homicide rates of Latin America. She was awarded the American Political Science Association Comparative Democratization Section 2019 Best Book Award. Yashar was the chair of the editorial board for the political science journal World Politics.
