= Westminster Presbyterian Church (Alexandria, Virginia) =

Church in Virginia, US

Coordinates: 38.8291°N 77.0735°W

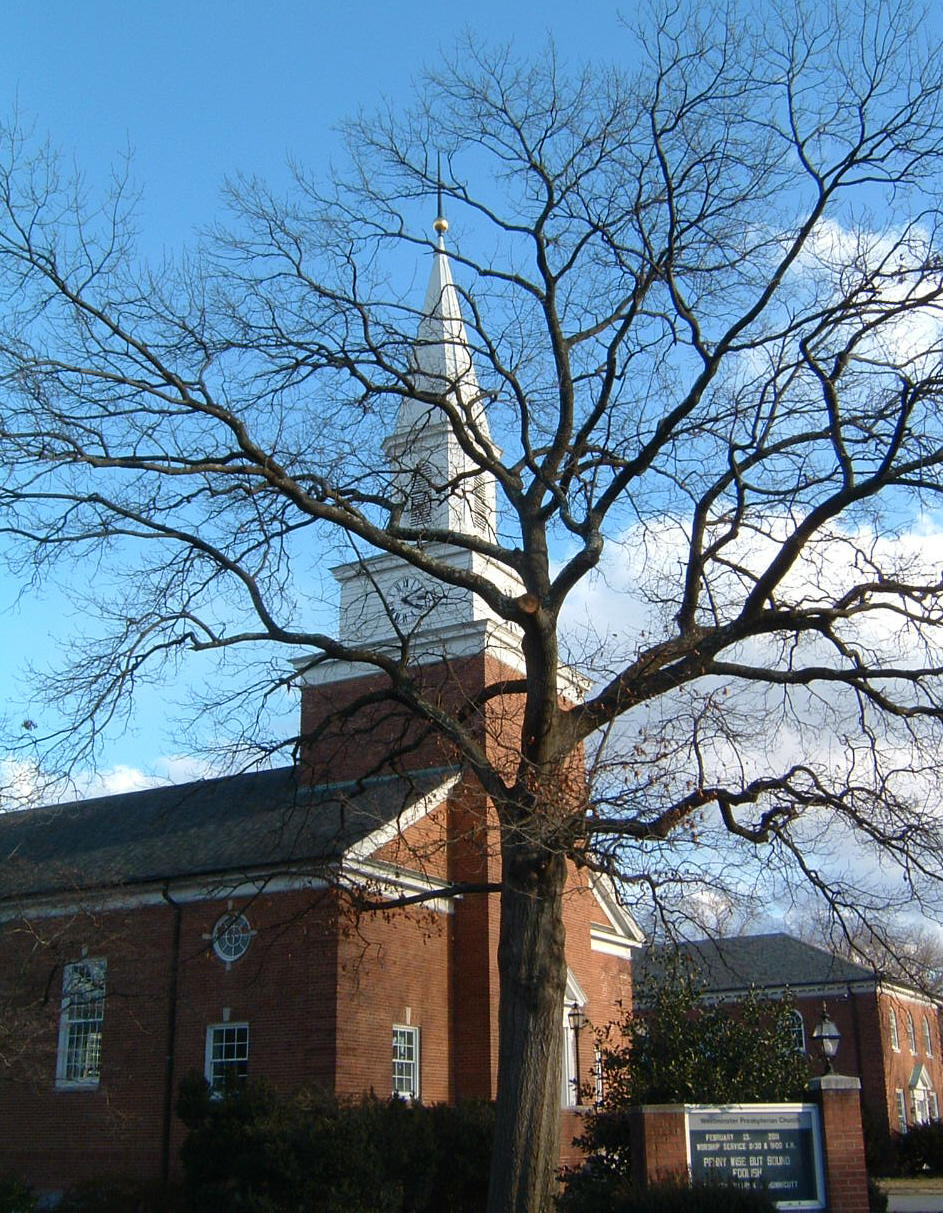
- Westminster Presbyterian Church
- Location: 2701 Cameron Mills Road; Alexandria, VA 22302
- Country: United States
- Denomination: Presbyterian Church (U.S.A.)
- Website: http://www.wpc-alex.org

History
- Founded: 1939

Architecture
- Style: Colonial Revival

Westminster Presbyterian Church of Alexandria, Virginia, U.S. located at the corner of Cameron Mills Road and Monticello Boulevard in the city's North Ridge neighborhood. Westminster Presbyterian Church is a member of the Presbyterian Church (U.S.A.), the Mid-Atlantic Synod and the National Capital Presbytery.

== History ==
The congregation was founded in 1939. Its initial colonial-style edifice was built in 1942. The current sanctuary was constructed in 1952 to accommodate the rapidly growing congregation; the old sanctuary became the chapel. The cornerstone of the new building was laid by then President Harry S. Truman.

In 1961, a large education building was added to accommodate Sunday school classes, music facilities, additional office spaces, and meeting areas for numerous church programs. The church's current organ is a three-manual M. P. Moller, installed by the firm in 1965; the dedicatory recital was played by Virgil Fox, the prominent American concert organist.

In 2006–07, the church underwent major renovations, during which the sanctuary was again rebuilt to accommodate the changing liturgical needs.

During the renovations on the church, Agudas Achim Congregation served as the temporary home of the church.

Senior Pastors at Westminster Presbyterian Church

- The Rev. Dr. Larry Hayward (from 2004 to present)
- The Rev. Dr. Stuart Broberg (from 1998 to 2003)
- The Rev. Dr. George Pera (from 1980 to 1995)
- The Rev. Donald A. Campbell (from 1971 to 1979)
- The Rev. Cliff Johnson (from 1943 to 1970)
- The Rev. Frederick W. Haverkamp (from 1939 to 1943)

== Worship ==
The order of service follows the structure of The Service for the Lord's Day as outlined in The Book of Common Worship of 1993, a directory of worship that has restored a liturgical tradition that is both Reformed and catholic (pre-denominational). While the centrality of Scripture is upheld through the Word read and proclaimed, the church recognizes that the true unity begins with the sacraments of Baptism and Communion. The Eucharist is recognized as central to the liturgy, which at Westminster Presbyterian Church is exemplified by the central position of the communion table. The unity of the communion table, the baptismal font, and the pulpit signify "the true road to healing the brokenness of Christ's church."

== Music ministry ==
Under the direction of Dr. R. Benjamin Hutchens, II, the music ministry at Westminster Presbyterian Church is firmly based in the traditions of classical music. Its music ministry offers the members opportunities to lead worship services as choristers, handbell players, vocal and instrumental soloists, and cantors. The 50 voice (auditioned) adult choir sings a great variety of music in worship, from Renaissance Motets to complex choral-orchestral works such as Durufle's Requiem, Ralph Vaughan Williams' "Dona nobis pacem," or Honneger's King David. In addition to leading in worship on Sunday mornings, the adult choir offers services of Choral Evensong regularly and tours internationally in even numbered years.

The Westminster Music Academy offers music education in the Christian Tradition for children pre-K through Grade 12. Our advanced middle and high school ensemble, Choristers, frequently joins the Adult Choir in choral-orchestral works and on international tours.
