= Julius Moravcsik =

American philosopher

Julius Matthew Emil Moravcsik (Hungarian: Moravcsik M. Gyula; 26 April 1931 – 3 June 2009) was a Hungarian-American philosopher who specialized in ancient Greek philosophy.

His main professional interests were in Greek philosophy – especially Plato, Aristotle, and the pre-Socratic philosophers. He also made important contributions to the philosophy of language, aesthetics, metaphysics, and ethics. In particular, he was engaged by the notion of friendship.

== Life and career ==
Julius Moravcsik was born April 26, 1931, in Budapest. His father was Gyula Moravcsik, his brother is Michael J. Moravcsik, and his sister is Edith A. Moravcsik. He died June 3, 2009, in Palo Alto, California, US, where he was a professor of philosophy at Stanford University.

Moravcsik left his native Hungary for the US at the age of 17. He earned his BA in philosophy at Harvard University, class of 1953. Subsequently, he spent a year of study at Oxford and then received his PhD from Harvard in 1959.

His first academic position was at Drexel Institute (now Drexel University) in Philadelphia, Pennsylvania, where he stayed a year. Next came a nine-year stay at the University of Michigan, where he went from instructor to associate professor. In 1968 he went to Stanford as Professor of Philosophy. He taught at Stanford for 39 years until he retired in 2007. During his career, he lectured at more than 50 colleges and universities in the US, as well as in 26 countries around the world.

During two periods, 1972–75 and 1983–86, Moravcsik served as chair of the Stanford Philosophy Department. He contributed greatly to building the department; his appointments, included Stuart Hampshire and J. O. Urmson from England and the Canadian philosopher Ian Hacking.

While at Stanford, Moravcsik encouraged the development of interdisciplinary initiatives. He helped forge strong connections between philosophy and classics. His advocacy was important in the formation of the Linguistics Department and the development of a History of Science Program. He was the principal investigator on a Sloan Cognitive Science Grant in the 1970s.

Many important relationships developed and common interests were discovered, at the many conferences and colloquia and courses that Moravcsik sponsored. These connections among philosophers, linguists, psychologists, computer scientists and others, not only from Stanford but also from research institutes such as SRI and Xerox-PARC, were important in formation of the Center for the Study of Language and Information and the Symbolic Systems Program.

== Honors and awards ==
Moravcsik won a Humboldt Prize in 2002.

He was elected an external member of the Hungarian Academy of Sciences in 2002.

He was made an honorary citizen of the City of Rhodos.

He received Santayana, Guggenheim and ACLS fellowships and was a fellow at the Center for Advanced Study in the Behavioral Sciences and at the Collegium Budapest.

He served as president of the American Philosophical Association, Pacific Division, 1987–88, and of the Society for Ancient Greek Philosophy 2003–04. He was a member of the board of trustees of the American Society for Aesthetics, 1988–92, and in 1975 he was cofounder of the West Coast Aristotelian Society.

== Professional career ==
Moravcsik wrote five books:

- 1975 Understanding Language: a study of theories of language in linguistics and in philosophy (Mouton, The Hague)
- 1990 Thought and Language (Routledge, London)
- 1992 Plato and Platonism (Blackwell, Oxford)
- 1998 Meaning, Creativity, and the Partial Inscrutability of the Human Mind (CSLI, Stanford)
- 2004 The Ties that Bind (CEU Press, Budapest)

He also wrote over 90 articles on a variety of topics and he edited and co-edited a number of volumes.

One of his first articles, "Being and Meaning in the Sophist" (1962), pioneered the use of techniques of analytical philosophy and logic to the interpretation of classical philosophy, and became a staple in seminars on Plato throughout the sixties. It has been reprinted in the Bobbs-Merrill classic philosophy series. Similar attention was given to many of his later works.

A volume of papers by former students and colleagues, presented at a conference honoring him on the occasion of his retirement was published in 2009: Logos and language. Essays in honor of Julius Moravcsik.
