= Andrew Moravcsik =

Professor of politics

- Born: Andrew Maitland Moravcsik; 1957 (age 68–69)
- Education: Stanford University; Johns Hopkins University; Harvard University
- Spouse: Anne-Marie Slaughter
- Scientific career
- Fields: Political science, history, public policy, international relations
- Workplaces: Princeton University
- Academic advisors: Robert Keohane, Stanley Hoffmann

Andrew Maitland Moravcsik (born 1957) is professor of politics and international affairs, director of the Liechtenstein Institute on Self-Determination, and founding director of the European Union Program and the International Relations Faculty Colloquium at Princeton University. Moravcsik is known for his academic research and policy writing on European integration, international organizations and for developing the theory of liberal intergovernmentalism.

Moravcsik is also a former policy-maker who currently serves as book review editor (Europe) of Foreign Affairs magazine. He was previously non-resident senior fellow of The Brookings Institution, contributing editor of Newsweek magazine and held other journalistic positions.

== Academic career ==
=== Academic positions ===
In 1992, Moravcsik began teaching at Harvard University's Department of Government. During his 12-year tenure in the department, Moravcsik became a full professor and founded Harvard's European Union program. He left the school in 2004 to assume a post at Princeton University. Since 2019 he also directs the Liechtenstein Institute on Self-Determination, a research institute.

He holds a lifetime appointment as distinguished affiliated professor at the Technical University of Munich (TUM), in Munich, Germany, where he is affiliated with its Hochschule für Politik and he teaches annually as Non-Resident Professor at the Florence School for Transnational Governance at the European University Institute in Firenze, Italy.

In 2023, he was awarded the Berlin Prize by the American Academy in Berlin.

=== Academic publications ===
With almost 49,000 academic citations, a recent study found that Moravcsik is the most cited US-based political scientist of his cohort. These writings include a book, entitled The Choice for Europe: Social Purpose and State Power from Messina to Maastricht, three edited volumes, and over 150 academic book chapters, journal articles, and reviews. The book, which the American Historical Review called "the most important work in the field" of modern European studies, attempts to explain why the member states of the European Union agreed to cede sovereignty to a supranational entity.

Moravcsik's "liberal intergovernmentalist" theory of European integration is widely regarded as a plausible account of the emergence and evolution of the European Union. It stresses the issue-specific functional national interests of member states and goes on to analyze the interstate bargains they strike among themselves and the rational incentive to construct institutions to render enforcement and elaboration of those bargains credible. Quantitative studies of research citations in EU studies conclude that liberal intergovernmentalism currently serves as the "baseline" academic theory of European integration, that is, it is the theory that most often confirmed and taken as a baseline for further extensions or for identification of anomalies. A recent restatement of liberal intergovernmentalism, published in 2018, elaborates a future research agenda.

Regarding international relations theory more generally, Moravcsik adheres to "liberal" theory in the sense that he seeks to explain state behavior with reference to variation in the underlying social purposes (substantive "national preferences" or "fundamental national interests," material or ideational) that states derive from their embeddedness in an interdependent domestic and transnational civil society. In contrast to realist, institutionalist, and various types of "constructivist" or "non-rational" theory, liberal theory privileges and directly theorizes social interdependence and globalization as the dominant force in world politics, past and present. Liberal theory, Moravcsik maintains, is empirically insufficient to explain much of international relations yet remains analytically more fundamental than other types of international relations theory, because it sets preconditions that are scope conditions under which other theories (such as realism, institutionalism and constructivism) affect world politics.

Moravcsik advocates greater transparency and replicability of textual, qualitative and historical research in international relations, political science, and the social sciences more generally. To this end, he has proposed the use of "active citation" the use of precise footnotes hyperlinked to source material contained in an appendix or on a permanent qualitative data repository. He has worked with other scholars to extend this approach through the "Annotation for Transparent Inquiry" (ATI) initiative. Moravcsik's book The Choice for Europe was criticized for imprecise and misleading use of historical sources.

== Policy career and public commentary ==
=== Policy positions ===
Prior to the start of his academic career, Moravcsik served in several policy positions. He was international trade negotiator at the US Department of Commerce, special assistant to South Korean Deputy Prime Minister Lee Hahn-Been, and press assistant at the Commission of the European Communities. He has subsequently served as a member and in leadership positions on policy commissions organized by the Council on Foreign Relations, the Brookings Institution, the Carnegie Endowment, the Commission of the European Communities, Princeton University and other organizations.

=== Public commentary ===
In 2002, Moravcsik began writing public commentary. Since 2009, he has served as book review editor (Europe) for Foreign Affairs magazine. He continues to engage in regular policy analysis and advising, currently focusing on EU–US burden-sharing, the democratic deficit in Europe, transatlantic relations, the future of the European Union, and Asian regionalism. He is known for his argument that Europe is the world's "second superpower" and for a soberly optimistic assessments of the European Union. He has also written and spoken for The Atlantic and other media outlets on the desirability of men serving as the "lead parent" for children and playing an equal or more active role in caring work.

== Education ==
Moravcsik received a BA in history from Stanford University in 1980 and, after a period working in the US and Asia, spent the next year and a half as a Fulbright fellow at the universities of Bielefeld, Hamburg, and Marburg in West Germany. In 1982 he enrolled at the Johns Hopkins University School of Advanced International Studies (SAIS) in Washington, DC, from which he received a Master of Arts degree in international relations in 1984. In 1992 he obtained an MA and PhD in political science from Harvard University.

== Personal life ==
Moravcsik spent most of his youth in Eugene, Oregon, where he graduated from Winston Churchill High School in 1975. His mother, Francesca de Gogorza, is a former landscape architect and urban planner. His father, Michael Moravcsik (1928–1989), was a professor of theoretical particle physics and helped to develop the field of citation studies.

Moravcsik is married to the legal academic and political scientist Anne-Marie Slaughter, with whom he has two sons.

== Select publications ==
- Moravcsik, Andrew (1998). The Choice for Europe: Preferences and Power from Messina to Maastricht (Ithaca: NY: Cornell University Press, 1998). (cited 8591 times)
- Moravcsik, Andrew (1993). "Preferences and power in the European Community: A liberal intergovernmentalist approach". Journal of Common Market Studies. 31 (4): 473–524. doi:10.1111/j.1468-5965.1993.tb00477.x. (cited 5496 times) [Named one of the "5 best articles of the decade" by JCMS]
- Moravcsik, Andrew (1997). "Taking Preferences Seriously: A Liberal Theory of International Politics". International Organization. 51 (4): 513–53. doi:10.1162/002081897550447. ISSN 0020-8183. JSTOR 2703498. S2CID 7058364. (cited 5139 times, plus 455 times as a working paper, also one of the top ten most cited articles on Graduate IR Field Seminar Syllabi)
- Moravcsik, Andrew (1991). "Negotiating the Single European Act: National Interests and Conventional Statecraft in the European Community". International Organization. 45 (1): 19–56. doi:10.1017/S0020818300001387. ISSN 0020-8183. JSTOR 2706695. S2CID 249403144. (cited 2613 times)
- Moravcsik, Andrew (2002). "In Defense of the Democratic Deficit: Reassessing Legitimacy in the European Union" (PDF). Journal of Common Market Studies. 40 (4): 603–24. doi:10.1111/1468-5965.00390. (cited 2493 times)
- Kenneth Abbott, Robert Keohane, Andrew Moravcsik and Anne-Marie Slaughter, "The Concept of Legalization," International Organization, Volume 54, Issue 3 (Summer 2000), pp. 401–419. (cited 2493 times)
- Moravcsik, Andrew (2003). "The origins of human rights regimes: Democratic delegation in postwar Europe". International Organization. 54 (2): 217–52. doi:10.1162/002081800551163. JSTOR 2601297. S2CID 16498994. (cited 1751 times)
- Moravcsik, Andrew and Jeff Legro. "Is Anybody Still a Realist?" International Security 24:2 (1999), pp. 5–55. (cited 1485 times)
- Moravcsik, Andrew. "Why the European Union Strengthens the State: Domestic Politics and International Cooperation" (Working Paper of the Minda de Gunzberg Center for European Studies, Harvard University, 1999) (cited 976 times plus 157 times in German translation)
- Moravcsik, Andrew. "Introduction: Integrating International and Domestic Theories of International Bargaining," in Peter Evans, Harold Jacobson and Robert Putnam, eds. Double-Edged Diplomacy: International Bargaining and Domestic Politics (Berkeley: University of California Press, 1993), pp. 3–42. (cited 741 times)
- Moravcsik, Andrew. "Is there a 'Democratic Deficit' in World Politics? A Framework for Analysis," Government and Opposition, Volume 39, Issue 2 (Spring 2004), pp. 336–363. (cited 908 times)
- Moravcsik, Andrew. "A New Statecraft? Supranational Entrepreneurs and International Cooperation," International Organization 53:2 (Spring 1999), pp. 267–306. (cited 840 times)
- Keohane, Robert, Andrew Moravcsik and Anne-Marie Slaughter. "Legalized Dispute Resolution: Interstate and Transnational," International Organization, Volume 54, Issue 3 (Summer 2000) pp. 457–488. (cited 770 times)
- Moravcsik, Andrew and Milada Vachudova. "National Interests, State Power and European Enlargement," East European Politics and Society (2003). (cited 712 times)
- Keohane, Robert; Macedo, Steven; and Moravcsik, Andrew. "Democracy-enhancing Multilateralism," International Organization, Volume 63, Issue 1, pp. 1–31. (cited 738 times)
- Moravcsik, Andrew. "Liberal Intergovernmentalism and Integration: A Rejoinder," Journal of Common Market Studies, Volume 33, Issue 4, pp. 611–637. (cited 651 times)
- Moravcsik, Andrew and Kalypso Nicolaidis. "Explaining the Treaty of Amsterdam: Interests, Influence, Institutions," Journal of Common Market Studies, Volume 37, Issue 1, pp. 57–85. (cited 635 times)
- Moravcsik, Andrew. "Liberal Intergovernmentalism," in Oxford Research Encyclopedia of Politics (Oxford: Oxford University Press, 2020). (cited 777 times)
- Moravcsik, Andrew, review of Lorenza Antonucci, Insecurity Politics: How Unstable Lives Lead to Populist Support, Princeton University Press, 2026, 224 pp., in Foreign Affairs, vol. 105, no. 3 (May/June 2026), p. 189. "This book argues that the rise of workplace and financial insecurity across Europe explains the recent gains of populist parties on both the left and the right. Antonucci, a sociologist, uses new measures and data to confirm two decades of research showing that globalization, technological change, and austerity undermine socioeconomic stability and social well-being, in turn boosting support for populist parties. The author also shows that populist voters are not, as commonly assumed, socially isolated people. Although the author correctly argues that this finding is entirely consistent with the rise of populist parties on the far left and their calls for more concerted EU social policy. this evidence does not explain why voters are flocking in greater numbers to far-right populist parties – many of which have advanced astonishingly regressive taxation and budgetary programs and hold stridently anti-EU views. Antonucci does not satisfactorily answer the question of why economic discontent pushes voters to the far right."

== See also ==
- List of political scientists
