= Jack Moline =

American Conservative rabbi (born 1952)

Rabbi Jack Moline
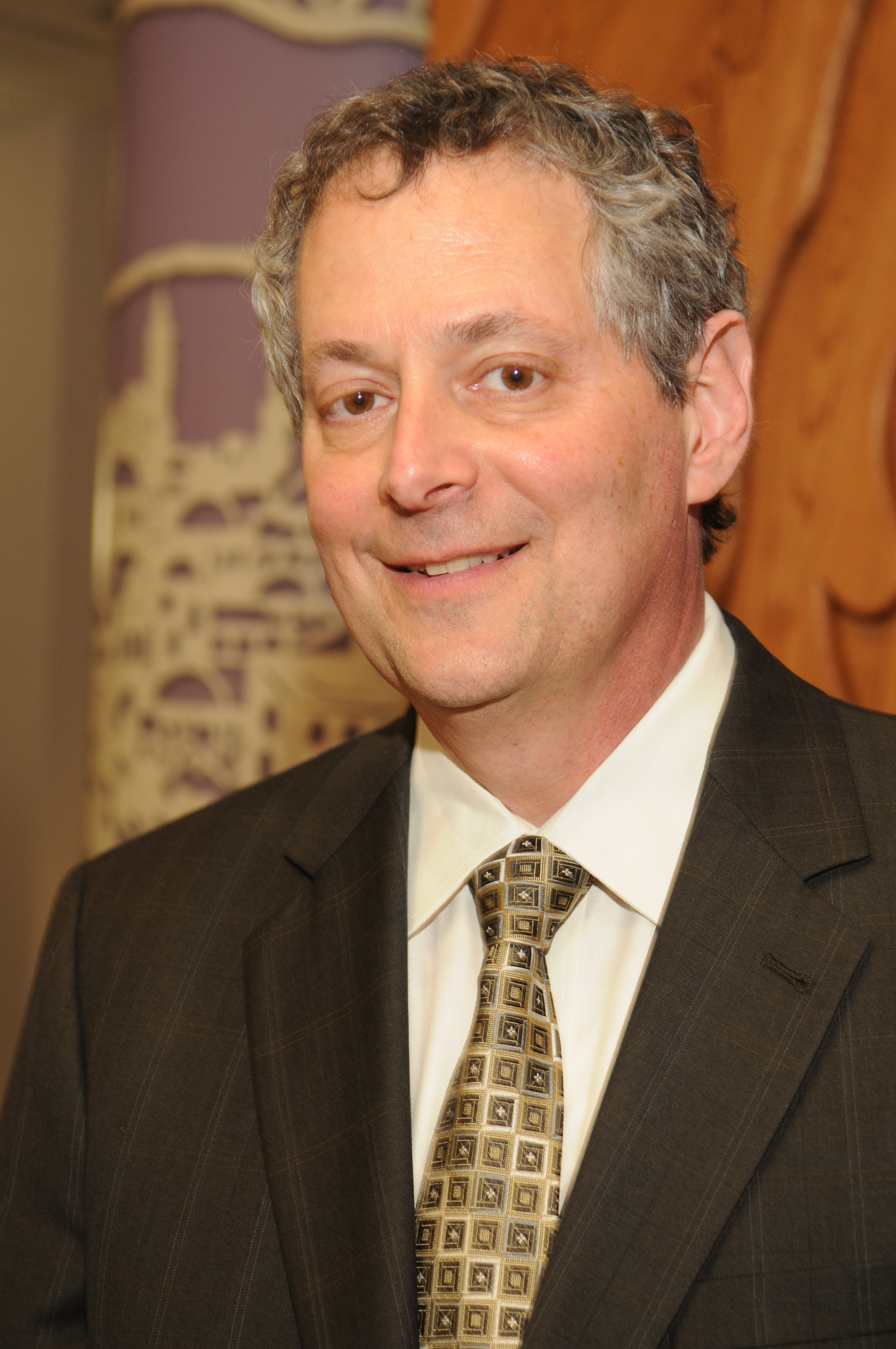
- Jack Moline

Personal life
- Born: August 10, 1952 (age 74) Chicago, Illinois

Religious life
- Religion: Judaism
- Ordination: Jewish Theological Seminary of America (1982)

Jewish leader
- Present post: Executive Director, Interfaith Alliance

Jack Moline (born August 10, 1952) is an American Conservative rabbi who retired as executive director of Interfaith Alliance in 2022, having served in the post since January 2015.

He is a former director of the National Jewish Democratic Council, and prior to that appointment, served as rabbi of Agudas Achim Congregation in Alexandria, Virginia since 1987 and Director of Public Policy for the Rabbinical Assembly since 2009,.

His appointment with Interfaith Alliance followed involvement with the organization over a period of many years, including service as chair of the board.

In 2008, he was named by Newsweek magazine as one of the top pulpit rabbis in America (#3 in a list of 25), and in 2010 and 2011 as one of the 50 most influential rabbis in America. He has served in numerous leadership positions for Jewish, interfaith, and community organizations, and has advised key religious and political leaders of the United States on issues of religion and values. In 1995, he helped write President Bill Clinton's famous "Shalom, Haver" eulogy for Israeli Prime Minister Yitzhak Rabin.

== Life and works ==
=== Early life ===
Moline is a native of Chicago whose jobs before becoming a rabbi included driving a delivery truck, working as a clown in a family restaurant and giving tours at Universal Studios in California (which included Hebrew tours to visiting Israelis).

He graduated from Northwestern University (School of Communications), in 1974. Before entering the Jewish Theological Seminary of America (JTS) he served as Director of Youth Activities for the Seaboard Region of United Synagogue and interim director of the Hillel Foundation at the University of Virginia.

He was ordained in 1982 by JTS in New York, spending his first two years at the University of Judaism (now the American Jewish University) in Los Angeles. During this time he held part-time positions at Camp Ramah as Winter Program Director, Temple Ramat Zion as Rabbinic Intern, in addition to his work at Universal Studios as Tour Guide. During third-year studies at the JTS Jerusalem campus, he served as rabbi of the Conservative congregation of Jerusalem's Jewish Quarter.

From 1980 to 1982, Moline completed his studies at the New York campus of JTS and served Congregation B'nai Israel in Danbury, Connecticut as student rabbi, serving as full-time rabbi and part-time Jewish chaplain at the Federal Correctional Institution there upon ordination. In 1987, he became rabbi of Agudas Achim Congregation of Northern Virginia, in Alexandria, Virginia

=== Professional service ===
In addition to his service as spiritual leader of Agudas Achim Congregation, Moline has served in leadership positions for numerous Jewish, interfaith, and community organizations. Among positions he currently holds or has held or are: Chair, Interfaith Relations Committee of the Jewish Council for Public Affairs; chair of the board, Interfaith Alliance; vice-president of the regional Rabbinical Assembly; the national board of the Faith and Politics Institute; the honorary board of Operation Understanding DC; President, Washington Board of Rabbis; President, the Alexandria Interfaith Association; the boards of the Jewish Community Center of Northern Virginia and the Interfaith Conference of Metropolitan Washington; the boards of the Rabbinical Assembly, the regional American Jewish Congress and Gesher Jewish Day School. He is also an adjunct faculty member of the Virginia Theological Seminary, has served on the Program Board of the Cathedral College of the Washington National Cathedral, is one of the U.S. religious advisors to Clergy Beyond Borders, and serves on the board of advisors to Legacy International.

Moline is frequently involved in special religious services and events, including a May 2010 trip to Israel with Rahm Emanuel. Moline co-officiated at the Bar Mitzvah ceremony for Emanuel's son and nephew, along with Rabbi Kenneth Chasen from Los Angeles. The ceremony took place at the site known as the "Masorti Kotel," the area at the southern end of the Western Wall where worshipers are allowed to pray without being separated into separate sections for men and women. In 2011 Moline officiated at a "Food and Justice Seder" held at the U.S. Department of Agriculture, and sponsored by the Jewish Funds for Justice and the Progressive Jewish Alliance.

==== Interfaith affairs ====
Moline has been active in numerous interfaith groups, including ongoing dialogues with African American ministers and social justice causes at home and abroad. He described the Interfaith Alliance as:

... a national organization, which now for almost a generation has been addressing the relationship between religious faith, politics and government. It stands for faith and freedom. We are, to the best of our knowledge, the only national organization that addresses the positive influence of religion on government and government on religion, protecting the independence of each.

In 2007, Moline attended a Christian Zionist Conference hosted by the Reverend John Hagee's organization, a decision that aroused some controversy within the Jewish community. Moline took pride in his participation, noting that "We're [those in the Jewish community] no longer in a position of being too selective in choosing our friends," and citing "the threat posed by Iran and Israel's growing isolation." He has also taken a strong stand against those who attack Islam in general or individual Muslims regardless of their own words and actions, and therefore was a strong voice among those who rebuked Republican congressman Allen West for his "intemperate" comments about Muslim Democratic congressman Keith Ellison and his Islamic faith. Moline was also one of the religious leaders to speak out against Rep. Peter T. King's 2011 congressional hearings on "the radicalization of American Muslims." In 2009 he spoke on the topic of "Preventing Future Holocausts" during a tour of the United States Holocaust Museum by a group of rabbis and imams from ten European nations.

Moline is on the steering committee of "Shoulder to Shoulder: Standing with American Muslims; Upholding American Values," which describes itself as "a campaign of national faith-based organizations and religious denominations to promote tolerance and put an end to anti-Muslim bigotry." In a March 2010 statement, the group wrote that

As American religious leaders, we share a deep sense of obligation to call upon our fellow citizens to treat each other with compassion and honesty, and to foster an ethical commitment to bedrock American values such as pluralism and religious freedom, mutuality and respect—values also at the core of our religious traditions.

For similar reasons, he was an outspoken critic of the 2005 documentary film "Obsession: Radical Islam's War Against the West," which he described as "a thinly-veiled call for disparagement and distrust of all Muslims."

Moline participated in the opening prayer service for the United States Congress in 2009 and 2011, representing the Jewish community at the request of Speaker-elect Nancy Pelosi and Speaker-elect John Boehner, respectively. In March 2011 he spoke at a special meeting of the "Black and Jewish Members of Congress Breakfast."

==== Political activist ====
In 2009, after years of trying to persuade the Conservative movement's Rabbinical Assembly that the movement needed a stronger presence in the nation's capital, the group made the decision to appoint a Director of Public Policy, turning to Moline to serve in that position as a volunteer. He had argued that other Jewish movements had such a presence, such as the Religious Action Center of Reform Judaism and the Orthodox Union's Institute for Public Affairs, both of which are "active players in the capital." Understanding that there is a "diverse RA membership behind him and an even more diverse population of Conservative Jews," Moline's responsibilities were expected to focus on "broad consensus positions of the movement and on laying out broad principles based on Conservative thinking." However, as one Washington Jewish Week article noted, "... he is also an experienced Washington player; a lot of the new Conservative movement's impact may be under the radar with Moline at the helm." Rabbi Jeffrey Wohlberg, then President of the Rabbinical Assembly, praised the choice of Moline for the new position, saying that "Rabbi Moline is that perfect combination of smart, well-connected, socially-savvy and thoroughly conversant on the issues of the day. In addition, he knows the ins and outs of the Washington world. His appointment ushers in an exciting new era for the Rabbinical Assembly and Conservative Judaism."

In 2010, Moline spoke to his friend Rahm Emanuel, the White House Chief of Staff, about the Obama administration's perceived lack of friendliness toward Israel. As a result of that conversation, Moline initiated two "intimate White House meetings" between the White House and "a carefully selected slate of 15 rabbis from across the country representing the Orthodox, Reform and Conservative streams." Moline's notes on those meetings, shared with the larger community by some of the participants, have become the official historical record of this initiative.

In December 2010, Moline was one of the religious leaders who urged the Senate to pass the DREAM Act (Development, Relief and Education for Alien Minors), stating that "We have a special responsibility to these young people who wish no longer to be resident strangers but to take their place among us." In 2011, when the newly installed Republican leadership in the House of Representatives considered a number of bills to restrict abortion, Moline worked with the Religious Coalition for Reproductive Choice to ensure religious voices were heard. Moline said that, "Abortion, while rarely desirable, is sometimes necessary. ... Jewish tradition believes that proper medical care is an essential aspect of human society, and that it should not be limited to people with exceptional resources." Asked to comment on a White House decision to include a creche in the East Room of the White House, Moline said it was not appropriate in the "public areas of the White House ... where every American should feel at home," as opposed to White House areas regarded as the presidential family's "private residence." "The display of a creche is a religious symbol," he said, "and is as out of place as a menorah. The issue has to do with what is consistent with the Constitution, and a creche in the East Room isn't."

Prior to the election of President Barack Obama, Moline actively supported Obama's campaign, helping to organize "Rabbis for Obama", and serving as one of its vice-chairs—stressing, along with all other rabbis involved in the effort, that he was working as a private citizen, not in any official capacity representing others. Before the 2013 inauguration, Obama and Biden invited Moline to offer a blessing for them and their families at a private worship service.

In 2014, Moline delivered the prayer at the inauguration of Governor Terry McAuliffe.

==== Speaker and writer ====
Moline is the author of two books, "Growing Up Jewish," a book of humor, and "Jewish Leadership and Heroism," a source book published by United Synagogue Youth. He writes about many subjects, including the issue of homosexuality and Jewish law, and is a frequent contributor to interfaith blogs such as "On Faith." He has advised and written for many public figures, including President Bill Clinton, for whom he composed much of his memorable eulogy for Israeli Prime Minister Yitzhak Rabin. Moline visited the White House weekly to lead a Torah study session with Rahm Emanuel, when Emanuel was a political advisor in the Clinton administration.

Moline is a popular speaker, featured at sessions at the Brandeis-Bardin Institute, the United Synagogue of Conservative Judaism, United Jewish Communities, the Democratic National Convention, on radio and television broadcasts and in synagogues and Jewish Community Centers across the United States and Canada.

In addition to his serious work with the Jewish community, the larger interfaith community, and the nation's leaders, he is also known for his sharp sense of humor. Referred to by Washington journalist James Besser as "one of the funniest rabbis around, " Moline is the author of a well known Jewish parody of Abbott and Costello's "Who's on First?" Vaudeville dialogue, known as “Abbott and Costello Learn Hebrew”. He is also the author of a humor column that used to be published in The New York Jewish Week. His book, "Growing up Jewish," was written at the urging of a cousin who was a literary agent who appreciated his sense of humor, and thought the book would be a good follow-up to an earlier work, "Growing up Catholic." Moline, who grew up with a love for humor, said that he always took great pleasure from the knowledge that The Three Stooges were Jewish. However, he also described his appreciation for the role of humor in Jewish history, noting that "Jews have used humor to stay sane in a world in which they have so often been mistreated," and there is a possibility that one reason there were so many Jewish comedians is that outsiders have sometimes been willing to "play the clown" in order to be accepted.

== Family ==
Moline and his wife have three children.

== Published works ==
- Growing Up Jewish (with Marcia Simha as illustrator), ISBN 978-0-14-009836-5
- Jewish Leadership and Heroism (with Jonah Layman as editor), ASIN: B000W2EPZM

== Awards and honors ==
On February 7, 2008, the Virginia General Assembly passed House Joint Resolution 366, commending Moline on his 20 years of service. In April 2010, JTS awarded him the "Gerson D. Cohen Rabbinic Leadership Award." He was named the third most important pulpit rabbi in America (out of a list of 25) by Newsweek in 2008, and one of the 50 most influential rabbis in America in 2010 and 2011.

In 2012, his wife and children honored him with the establishment of the Sixty Fund, which he runs and which recognizes individuals and groups based on "courage, compassion, generosity and wisdom."
