= Religious Liberty Commission =

US presidential advisory body for religious liberty issues

Agency overview
- Formed: May 1, 2025
- Jurisdiction: Federal Government of the United States
- Agency executives: Dan Patrick, Chairman; Mary Margaret Bush, Director
- Key document: Executive Order 14291
- Website: Official website

The Religious Liberty Commission is an advisory body of the United States federal government. Created on May 1, 2025, it is tasked with creating a comprehensive report on "the foundations of religious liberty in America, the impact of religious liberty on American society, current threats to domestic religious liberty, strategies to preserve and enhance religious liberty protections for future generations, and programs to increase awareness of and celebrate America's peaceful religious pluralism". The draft report was published on June 26, 2026. The commission is also tasked with advising the White House Faith Office and the Domestic Policy Council on the religious liberty policies of the United States.

The commission is composed of up to 14 commissioners (Note: While the executive order authorizes up to 14 commissioners, only 12 are currently appointed.) appointed by the President of the United States, as well as several advisory boards and ex-officio members; it is chaired by Texas Lt Governor Dan Patrick.

The commission was set to expire on July 4, 2026, during the United States Semiquincentennial, though the president can extend it. It was formed by President Donald Trump through executive order.

== Structure ==
The Religious Liberty Commission was established by Executive Order 14291 on May 1, 2025. The commission has up to 14 commissioners, including a Chair and Vice Chair, who will serve an initial 1-year term that expires on July 4, 2026 during the United States Semiquincentennial when the commission will dissolve. After that, the members may serve 2-year terms at the president's discretion if the president chooses to extend the commission's existence.

The Attorney General, Secretary of Housing and Urban Development, and Assistant to the President for Domestic Policy also serve on the commission as ex-officio members.

The commission also has the following advisory boards: the Advisory Board of Religious Leaders, the Advisory Board of Lay Leaders, and the Advisory Board of Legal Experts.

The commission Chairman is Texas Lt Governor Dan Patrick and the Vice Chairman is Ben Carson.

== Draft report ==
The draft of the commission's report was published on June 26, 2026. It will be open for public comment for 15 days.

The draft report recommends that the federal government pursue policies to increase protection of religious expression in schools, faith-based institutions, parental rights, and healthcare conscious objections. The draft also recommended the adoption of universal school choice.

The report notes the rise of anti-religious hatred and discrimination, especially antisemitism, in America, and recommended that the DOJ Civil Rights Division and Equal Employment Opportunity Commission improve enforcement of Title VI and Title VII of the Civil Rights Act against religious discrimination, including antisemitism, by establishing a set, expedited timeline for the investigation and prosecution of credible allegations of religious discrimination, and, as appropriate, tying future federal funding to prompt remediation.

The draft report also criticized the conception of a "wall of separation between church and state," (a phrase that originates from a letter written by Thomas Jefferson) which it states "does not appear in the First Amendment or anywhere else in the Constitution" and argues has been used "to justify excluding religious Americans from equal participation in the public square." The draft report argues that rather, the Establishment Clause "means that the government may not officially prefer one religion over another, take over the functions of a church, or coerce religious observance." The draft recommends that the Department of Justice issue guidance on the "proper understanding" of the establishment clause and separation of church and state. The group Americans United for Separation of Church and State criticized the report, suggesting that its message is exclusionary and reflects a push to fuse Christianity into public schools and government.

== Controversies ==
In February 2026, President Donald Trump was sued by a group of multifaith organizations (including the Interfaith Alliance, Muslims for Progressive Values, the Sikh American Legal Defense and Education Fund and Hindus for Human Rights) who alleged that his appointments to the commission were not in compliance with the Federal Advisory Committee Act (FACA). The group claimed that the commission is not "fairly balanced in terms of the points of view represented" as it says FACA requires, because the commissioners were 12 Christians and one Jew; there is no representation for other American religious communities such as Muslims, Hindus, and Sikhs. The administration responded that Trump had "promised to protect religious freedom for all people of faith and created the Religious Liberty Commission to address current threats to domestic religious liberty."

In February 2026, Carrie Prejean was removed from the commission by Chairman Dan Patrick who said that she had "hijack[ed] a hearing on antisemitism for [her] own personal and political agenda." The removal came after some of Prejean's comments while questioning witnesses about the differences between antizionism and antisemitism during a commission hearing on antisemitism earlier that week had sparked controversy. Prejean asked: "Catholics do not embrace Zionism, just so you know. So are all Catholics antisemites?" and asked the witnesses, who were testifying about their experiences with antisemitism on college campuses after the October 7th attacks, "are you willing to condemn what Israel has done in Gaza?"

== See also ==
- White House Faith Office
- Religious liberty
- First Amendment
- Separation of church and state
