= Balance of power =

Balance of power may refer to:

== Politics and international relations ==
- Balance of power (international relations), parity or stability between competing forces
- Balance of power (federalism), distribution of power between a central government and its subnational governments
- Balance of power (parliament), power exercised by a minor political party whose support enables a minority government to obtain office
- European balance of power, European international relations before the First World War

== Arts and entertainment ==
- Balance of Power (album), by Electric Light Orchestra, 1986
- Balance of Power (band), a British melodic progressive metal group formed in 1995
- Balance of Power (Stableford novel), by Brian Stableford, 1979
- "Balance of Power" (Red Dwarf), a 1988 TV episode
- "The Balance of Power" (Minder), a 1984 TV episode
- Balance of Power (board game), a board game published by Hasbro in 1979
- Balance of Power (play-by-mail game)
- Balance of Power (Ab Hugh novel), a 1994 novel from the Star Trek universe by Dafydd Ab Hugh
- Balance of Power (video game), 1985
  - Balance of Power: The 1990 Edition

== See also ==
- Power Balance, a brand of hologram bracelets
- Checks and balances, a model of governance characterized by a separation of powers among branches of government
- Mixed government, a constitution compromising between several forms of state, balancing social forces by sharing sovereignty between them
- Consociationalism, a form of government involving guaranteed group representation
- Balance of terror
- Balance of threat
