= Soft balancing =

Tactics used by weak states to maintain the balance of power among strong states

Soft balancing is a recent addition to balance of power theory used to describe non-military forms of balancing evident since the end of the Cold War, particularly during and after the 2003 Iraq War. Soft balancing as a strategy can be attributed to the work of Robert Pape and T. V. Paul. It was criticized by Stephen Brooks, William Wohlforth and Augusto Dall'Agnol. The theory has seen further refinement to consider a broader universe of cases and specify the conditions under which soft balancing occurs. Soft balancing has been practiced in many developing countries, such as Brazil, India and South Africa. Most countries share the common denominator of not having a strong military force, thus they utilize internal force rather than aggressive force.

Soft balancing occurs when weaker states decide that the dominance and influence of a stronger state is unacceptable, but that the military advantage of the stronger state is so overwhelming that traditional balancing is infeasible or even impossible. In addition to overwhelming military superiority, scholars also suggest that democratic peace theory suggests a preference toward soft, rather than hard, balancing among democracies.

As opposed to traditional balancing, soft balancing is undertaken not to physically shift the balance of power but to undermine, frustrate, and increase the cost of unilateral action for the stronger state. Soft balancing is not undertaken via military effort, but via a combination of economic, diplomatic and institutional methods. In other words, soft balancing uses "non-military tools to delay, frustrate and undermine aggressive unilateral U.S. military policies". Since it uses non-military means, soft balancing is regarded as ineffective by Thomas Mowle and David Sacko, who write that soft balancing is “balancing that does not balance at all.”

Soft balancing is contrasted with hard balancing and bandwagoning.

== See also ==
- Balance of threat
- Balance of power in international relations
- Bandwagoning
- Hard balancing
