= Bop =

BOP or Bop may refer to:

== Animals and plants ==
- Bird of prey, eagles, hawks, owls and other raptors
- Bird-of-paradise, a family of birds
- BOP clade, a lineage of plants in the grass family (Poaceae)

== Government and law ==
- Balance of power (disambiguation)
- Balance of probabilities, a legal standard of proof
- Board of Peace, an international organization led by Donald Trump
- Border Observation Post, United States Military Border Observation Post
- Border outpost, or border observation post
- Breach of the peace (common law)
- Federal Bureau of Prisons, a branch of the U.S. Justice Department

== Music ==
=== Music styles ===
- Bebop, often shortened to "bop", an early modern jazz developed in the 1940s
- Hard bop, a style of jazz music that is an extension of bebop (or "bop") music

=== Songs and albums ===
- "Bop Bop", a 2015 song by Romanian singer Inna
- "Bop Bop!", a 2022 song by Viviz
- "Bop" (DaBaby song), 2019
- "Bop" (Dan Seals song), 1986
- "Bop" (Mondo song), 2025
- Bop!, a 1997 album by jazz saxophonist Frank Morgan
- "Bop", a 2020 song by CJ
- "Bop", a 2023 song by Davido from Timeless
- "Bop", a 2019 song by Tyga from Legendary, with YG and Blueface
- "Bop", a 2024 song by Usher from Coming Home
- "Bop", a 2023 song by YoungBoy Never Broke Again from Decided 2
- "Bop!", a 2019 song by JoJo Siwa
- "BOP!", a 2024 EP and song by Vanessa Williams, Trixie Mattel, and Lion Babe

== Places ==
- Bay of Pigs, in Cuba; the site of the abortive Bay of Pigs Invasion by ex-Cubans, supported by the United States
- Bay of Plenty, New Zealand
  - Bay of Plenty Region, named after the bay
- Bophuthatswana, South Africa

== Science and technology ==
- Balance of plant, the supporting components and auxiliary systems of a power plant
- Basic oxygen process, a method of steelmaking
- Best Operating Practice, a designation for best practice notably used by Thames Water, to describe operation of water and waste water treatment plants in the UK
- BIOS operation (bop), used as noun and verb, a technique to transition from 16-bit virtual x86 mode to 32-bit protected mode utilized by Microsoft's NTDOS
- Bleeding on probing, expression used by dentists to signify gingival (gum) bleeding on mechanical stimulation by a probe
- Blowout preventer, a large valve used in oil or natural gas drilling
- Bond order potential, a form of interatomic potential used, for example, in molecular dynamics simulations
- BOP reagent, Benzotriazole-1-yl-oxy-tris-(dimethylamino)-phosphonium hexafluorophosphate

== Transportation ==
- Border Pacific Railroad, a short-line railroad headquartered in Rio Grande City, Texas, United States
- Bowes Park railway station, London, United Kingdom (National Rail station code BOP)
- Bouar Airport, Central African Republic (IATA code BOP)
- BOP, an acronym applied as an adjective to components or technologies that are common between three Divisions of General Motors: Buick, Oldsmobile, and Pontiac, e.g. Bellhousing Patterns, or Rear Axle Design
- Station code for Bogor Paledang railway station, Indonesia

== Other uses ==
- Bop (magazine), an American magazine for teens
- B.O.P., The Boy's Own Paper
- Balance of payments, measure of payments that flow between any individual country and all other countries
- Bottom of the pyramid or base of the pyramid, the largest, but poorest socio-economic group
- Broken orange pekoe, a grade of tea leaves
- Businessowners policy, a type of insurance policy
- Balance of performance (BoP), a mechanism to maintain parity between cars in auto racing
- Bop it!, a handheld toy made by Hasbro
- Bop TV, television station from South Africa
- Bank of Punjab, a provincial bank in Pakistan
- Bop, a fictional planet in the Kerbal Space Program video game
