= Balance of power (international relations) =

Theory in international relations

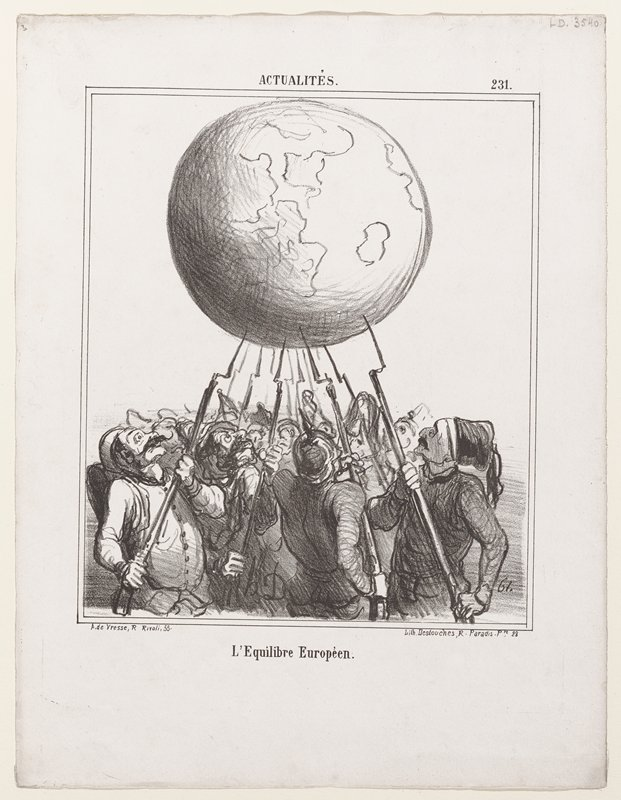
1866 cartoon by Honoré Daumier, L’Equilibre Européen, representing the balance of power as soldiers of different nations teeter the earth on bayonets

The balance of power theory in international relations suggests that states may secure their survival by preventing any one state from gaining enough military power to dominate all others. If one state becomes much stronger, the theory predicts it will take advantage of its weaker neighbors, thereby driving them to unite in a defensive coalition. Some realists maintain that a balance-of-power system is more stable than one with a dominant state, as aggression is unprofitable when there is equilibrium of power between rival coalitions.

When threatened, states may seek safety either by balancing, allying with others against the prevailing threat; or bandwagoning, aligning themselves with the threatening power. Other alliance tactics include buck passing and chain-ganging. Realists have long debated how the polarity of a system impacts the choice of tactics; however, it is generally agreed that in bipolar systems, each great power has no choice but to directly confront the other. Along with debates between realists about the prevalence of balancing in alliance patterns, other schools of international relations, such as constructivists, are also critical of the balance of power theory, disputing core realist assumptions regarding the international system and the behavior of states.

== History ==
The principle involved in preserving the balance of power as a conscious goal of foreign policy, as David Hume pointed out in his Essay on the Balance of Power, is as old as history, and was used by Greeks such as Thucydides both as political theorists and as practical statesmen. A 2018 study in International Studies Quarterly confirmed that "the speeches of the Corinthians from prior to the Persian Wars to the aftermath of the Peloponnesian War reveal an enduring thesis of their foreign policy: that imperial ambitions and leveling tendencies, such as those of Athens, Sparta, and Thebes, should be countered in order to prevent a tyrant city from emerging within the society of Greek city-states."

It resurfaced among the Renaissance Italian city-states in the 15th century. Francesco Sforza, Duke of Milan, and Lorenzo de' Medici, ruler of Florence, were the first rulers to actively pursue such a policy, with the Italic League, though historians have generally attributed the innovation to the Medici rulers of Florence. Discussion of Florence's policy can be found in De Bello Italico, by Bernardo Rucellai, a Medici son-in-law. This was a history of the invasion of Italy by Charles VIII of France, and introduced the phrase balance of power to historical analysis.

While the balance of power was not explicitly mentioned in the Peace of Westphalia, it was referenced during the negotiations. Subsequent behavior by states reflected the balance of power. In the Treaty of Utrecht in 1713, the doctrine was explicitly referenced multiple times.

It was not until the beginning of the 17th century, when Grotius and his successors developed the idea of international law, that the balance of power was formulated as a fundamental principle of diplomacy, although this formulation must have reflected existing practices. In accordance with this new discipline, the European states formed a sort of federal community, the fundamental condition of which was the preservation of a balance of power, i.e., such a disposition of things that no one state, or potentate, should be able absolutely to predominate and prescribe laws to the rest. And, since all were equally interested in this settlement, it was held to be the interest, the right, and the duty of every power to interfere, even by force of arms, when any of the conditions of this settlement were infringed upon, or assailed by, any other member of the community.

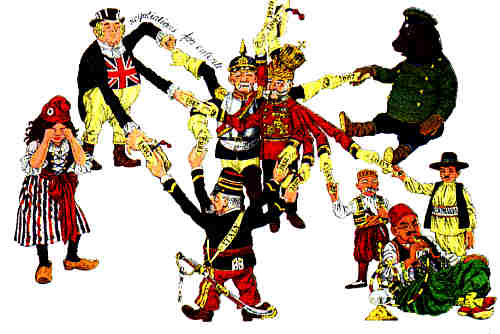
19th-century cartoon of European alliances 1870–1890 showing a balance of power with Marianne, representing France, crying alone in the bottom-left corner thanks to German chancellor Otto von Bismarck's (pictured in the center) successful attempts to keep her isolated from the rest of the European powers

This balance-of-power principle, once formulated, became an axiom of political science. Fénelon, in his Instructions, impressed the axiom upon the young French Dauphin. Frederick the Great, in his Anti-Machiavel, proclaimed the principle to the world. In 1806, Friedrich von Gentz re-stated it with admirable clarity, in Fragments on the Balance of Power. The principle formed the basis of the coalitions against Louis XIV and Napoleon, and the occasion (or excuse) for most of the European wars between the Peace of Westphalia (1648) and the Congress of Vienna (1814). It was especially championed by Great Britain, even up to World War I, as it sought to prevent a European land power from rivaling its naval supremacy.

During the greater part of the 19th century, the series of national upheavals which remodeled the map of Europe obscured the balance of power. Yet, it underlaid all the efforts of diplomacy to tame the forces of nationalism let loose by the French Revolution. In the revolution's aftermath, with the restoration of comparative calm, the principle once more emerged as the operative motive for the various political alliances, of which the ostensible object was the preservation of peace. Regarding the era 1848–1914, English diplomatic historian A.J.P. Taylor argued:

Europe has known almost as much peace as war; and it has owed these periods of peace to the Balance of Power. No one state has ever been strong enough to eat up all the rest, and the mutual jealousy of the Great Powers has preserved even the small states, which could not have preserved themselves.

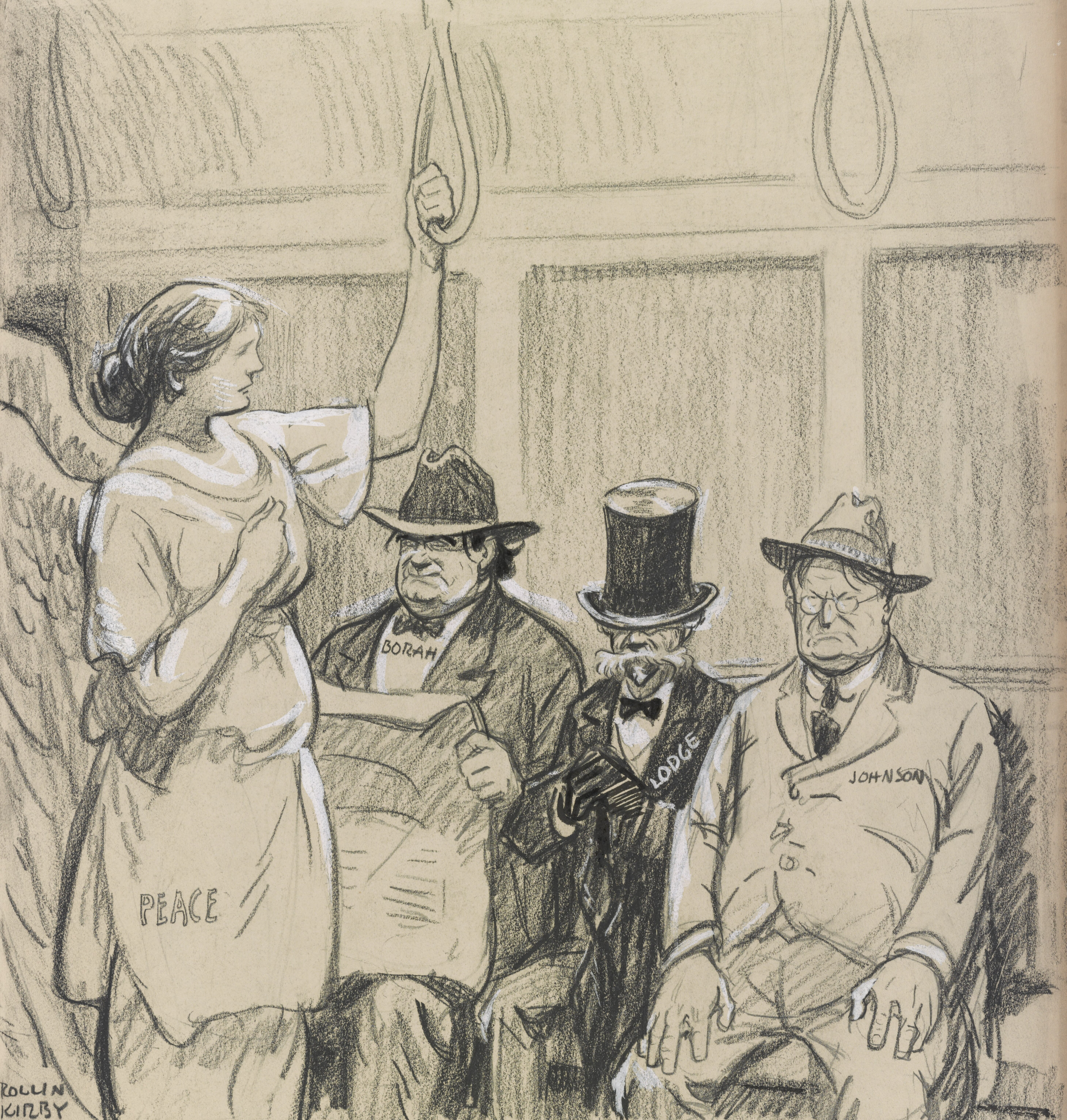
U.S. Senators William Borah; Henry Cabot Lodge; Hiram Johnson who lead the fight against the Treaty of Versailles

Regarding the last quarter-century of the period outlined by Taylor, his American colleague, diplomatic historian Edward Mead Earle, argued: "During the quarter-century beginning about 1890, Europe and the Far East lived under a precarious balance of power with the result … that the world moved crazily from one crisis to another and finally to catastrophe". Earle concludes: "The balance of power may well land us all in crematory".

The balance of power theory prepared catastrophe in 1939 as in 1914, wrote Clarence Streit in his famous Union Now. There is "no more sterile, illusory, fantastic, exploded and explosive peace policy than the balance of power."

In 1953, Ernst B. Haas criticized balance of power theory, arguing that international relations works that used the concept were plagued with "philological, semantic, and theoretical confusion."

Since 1945, the arguments of Streit and Earle has prevailed over that of Taylor. Atomic scientists launched an all-out attack on the balance-of-power concept:

The balance-of-power system is discredited today. References to it, even by professional historians and international lawyers, commonly imply either that it was a system for war which repeatedly failed or that it was a system for making war which often succeeded in its purpose … During the period of its dominance as a European system, say, 1648 to 1918, its record in preventing war was certainly not striking. Indeed, it probably was itself responsible for starting more wars than it prevented.

Former German Foreign Minister Joschka Fischer interpreted the core of the concept of Europe after 1945 as the rejection of the European balance-of-power principle and the hegemonic ambitions of individual states that had emerged following the Peace of Westphalia in 1648: "European integration was the response to centuries of a precarious balance of powers on this continent which again and again resulted in terrible hegemonic wars and culminated in the two World Wars between 1914 and 1945." Former US Secretary of Defense Dick Cheney expressed the same for Europe and other democracies: "It is not in our interest or those of the other democracies to return to earlier periods in which multiple military powers balanced one against another in what passed for security structures, while regional, or even global peace hung in the balance." NATO Secretary General, Manfred Wörner, outlined the European alternative at the end of the Cold War:

Europe has a basic choice: either it lapses back into the old power politics and balance of power diplomacy of past centuries or it moves ahead along the road leading to a new order of peace and freedom, whether this be based on multinational or supranational cooperation. Our choice is clear: we are going forward.

According to historian Sverre Bagge, a balance of power logic may have prevented unification of the three Scandinavian kingdoms (Norway, Sweden and Denmark), as balancing coalitions formed to prevent one kingdom from conquering the other kingdoms.

=== England ===
It has been argued by historians that, in the sixteenth century, England came to pursue a foreign policy which would preserve the equilibrium between Spain and France, which evolved into a balance-of-power policy:

The continental policy of England [after 1525] was fixed. It was to be pacific, mediating European affairs, favorable to a balance which should prevent any power from having a hegemony on the continent or controlling the Channel coasts. The naval security of England and the balance of power in Europe were the two great political principles which appeared in the reign of Henry VIII and which, pursued unwaveringly, were to create the greatness of England.

In 1579, the first English translation of Francesco Guicciardini's Storia d'Italia ("History of Italy") popularised the Italian balance of power theory in England. This translation was dedicated to Elizabeth I of England and claimed that "God has put into your hand the balance of power and justice, to poise and counterpoise at your will the actions and counsels of all the Christian kings of your time".

Thomas Carlyle referred to statesmen "in shadow-hunting, shadow-hunted hour ... looking with intense anxiety into a certain spectral something they call the Balance of Power."

Statesman Richard Cobden labeled the balance of power "a chimera" due to its unclear meaning: "It is not a fallacy, a mistake, an imposture—it is an undescribed, indescribable, incomprehensible nothing." The only point on which writers on the balance of power agree "is in the fundamental delusion that such a system was ever acceded to by the nations of Europe." They imply long, uninterrupted, peaceful and prosperous co-existence. Instead, for centuries "Europe has (with only just sufficient intervals to enable the combatants to recruit their wasted energies) been one vast and continued battle-field…" He criticized Lord Bacon for his adherence to the balance of power as a universal rule:

As for the rule of Lord Bacon: were the great enemy of mankind himself to summon a council, to devise a law of nations which should convert this fair earth, with all its capacity for life, enjoyment, and goodness, into vast theater of death and misery, more dismal than his own Pandemonium, the very words of the philosopher would compose that law! It would reduce us even below the level of animals… [T]his rule would, if acted upon universally, plunge us into a war of annihilation … nor would the leveling strife cease until either the rule were abrogated, or mankind had been reduced to the only pristine possessions—teeth and nails! [Under such grounds] the question of the balance of power might be dismissed from further considerations.

Controversies in the Nineteenth Century over whether a well-planned balance of power averted war were due in part to the lack of data, which complicated assessing whether a balance existed. In 1813 William Playfair, a political writer who occasionally served as a secret agent and advisor to Secretary at War William Windham and Secretary of War Henry Dundas, used quantitative data to publish an analysis in a pamphlet dedicated to Tsar Alexander I showing how Britain and Russia could combine resources to counterbalance a potentially re-emergent France.

Sir Esme Howard wrote that England adopted the balance of power as "a cornerstone of English policy, unconsciously during the sixteenth, subconsciously during the seventeenth, and consciously during the eighteenth, nineteenth and twentieth centuries, because for England it represented the only plan of preserving her own independence, political and economic". With the coming of World War II, however, Edward Carr found that today the balance of power badly preserves the independence of England:

The size of the units which count effectively in international politics grows steadily larger. There is no longer room in Europe today for those three or four important and strong countries whose more or less equal rivalries enabled Great Britain in the past to secure herself through the policy of the balance of power. Much nonsense has been talked in recent years about the balance of power. But the confusion of thought resulting from the attempt to brand it as a morally reprehensive policy has been less serious than the confusion resulting from the assumption that it is a policy which can be applied at all times and in all circumstances. The principal military reason why … is that the balance of power in Europe has hopelessly broken down... The possibility of restoring the balance did not exist after 1919; and British policy, based on a false premise, ended in disaster.

In 1941, Winston Churchill was criticized by his rival, Adolf Hitler, for his adherence to the balance of power:

Churchill is a man with an out-of-date political idea—that of the European balance of power. It no longer belongs to the sphere of realities. And yet it's because of this superstition that Churchill stirred England up to war.

On another occasion he added: Without the Wehrmacht, a "wave would have swept over Europe that would have taken no care of the ridiculous British idea of the balance of power in Europe in all its banality and stupid tradition—once and for all."

In fact, Churchill shortly adopted a similar view: Our Russian friends and Allies, he spoke in 1946, most admire strength and least respect military weakness. "For that reason the old doctrine of a balance of power is unsound. We cannot afford … to work on narrow margins, offering temptations to a trial of strength." If the Western Democracies do not stand together "then indeed catastrophe may overwhelm us all." If, however, "the population of the English-speaking Commonwealths be added to that of the United States with all that such co-operation implies in the air, on the sea, all over the globe and in science and in industry, and in moral force, there will be no quivering, precarious balance of power to offer its temptation to ambition or adventure. On the contrary, there will be an overwhelming assurance of security."

=== Historical evidence against balance of power theory ===
A 2021 assessment by Morten Skumsrud Andersen and William C. Wohlforth concluded that balance of power is not a universal empirical law and that it does not merit explanatory precedence in international relations research.

In an attempt to disprove the balance of power theory, some realists have pointed to cases in international systems other than modern Europe where balancing failed and a hegemon arose. A collaboration between nine scholars (William Wohlforth, Richard Little, Stuart J. Kaufman, David Kang, Charles A. Jones, Victoria Tin-Bor Hui, Arthur Eckstein, Daniel Deudney, and William L. Brenner) pointed to the failure of state-like units to balance against Assyria in the first millennium BCE; the Hellenic successor states of Alexander the Great to balance against Rome; the Warring States to balance against the Qin dynasty in ancient China and five other cases. This cross-cultural research concludes:

Given that the version of the theory we are testing is universalistic in its claims – that 'hegemony leads to balance … through all of the centuries we can contemplate' – case selection is unimportant. Any significant counterexample falsifies the universal claim; eight such examples demolish it.

Wohlforth et al. state that systemic hegemony is likely under two historically common conditions: First when the rising hegemon develops the ability to incorporate and effectively administer conquered territories. And second, when the boundaries of the international system remain stable, and no new major powers emerge from outside the system. When the leading power can administer conquests effectively so they add to its power and when the system's borders are rigid, the probability of hegemony is high. The argument of universal reproduction of anarchy can be correct in the European context, "whereas a systematic survey of world history reveals that multipolarity has frequently given way to unipolarity or hegemony." Henry Kissinger, historian by profession, noted that "theories of the balance of power often leave the impression that it is the natural form of international relations. In fact, balance-of-power systems have existed only rarely in history." Yet based on these rare occurrences, many realists "elevate a fact of life … into a guiding principle of world order." Earlier, political scientist Martin Wight had drawn a conclusion with unambiguous implication for the modern world:

Most states systems have ended in the universal empire, which has swallowed all the states of the system. The examples are so abundant that we must ask two questions: Is there any states system which has not led fairly directly to the establishment of a world empire? Does the evidence rather suggest that we should expect any states system to culminate in this way? …It might be argued that every state system can only maintain its existence on the balance of power, that the later is inherently unstable, and that sooner or later its tensions and conflicts will be resolved into a monopoly of power.

Still earlier, Quincy Wright, concluded on the balance of power in world history:

The predominance of the balance of power in the practice of statesmen for three centuries … should not obscure the fact that throughout world history periods dominated by the balance-of-power policies have not been the rule. The balance of power scarcely existed anywhere as a conscious principle of international politics before 1500…

Evoking examples of the ancient Chinese and Roman civilizations, Quincy Wright added:

Balance of power systems have in the past tended, through the process of conquest of lesser states by greater states, towards reduction in the number of states involved, and towards less frequent but more devastating wars, until eventually a universal empire has been established through the conquest by one of all those remaining.

The post-Cold War period represents an anomaly to the balance of power theory too. Rousseau defined the theoretical limit how far balance of power can be altered: "Will it be supposed that two or three potentates might enter into an agreement to subdue the rest? Be it so. These three potentates, whoever they may be, will not possess half the power of all Europe." In 2009, Stephen Walt observed, "Within two-and-a-half centuries, only one potentate possessed half the power of all the world, including Europe. In 2008, US military expenditures, including supplemental spending, exceeded those of the rest of the world combined."

Since 2000, the founder of Neorealism, Kenneth Waltz, confessed that "the present condition of international politics is unnatural." "Clearly something has changed." Wohlforth, Little and Kaufman undertook the above-mentioned historical study after they had coped with what they called the "puzzle" of the unipolar stability. Elsewhere, Richard Little wrote: Events since the end of the Cold War "create a potential anomaly" for the theory because the outcome has "left the United States as the sole superpower in a unipolar world ... A major puzzle for realists ... is the fact that unipolarity has not provoked a global alarm to restore a balance of power." The same anomaly stressed seventeen other experts on alliances, Stephen Walt, Randall Schweller, Xiaoyu Pu, John Ikenberry, Robert Pape, T. V. Paul, Jack S. Levy, William R. Thompson, John Lewis Gaddis, David A. Lake, Campbell Craig, Fareed Zakaria, John M. Owen, Michael Mastanduno, Thomas S. Mowle, David H. Sacko and Terry Narramore:

To date, at least, there is little sign of a serious effort to forge a meaningful anti-American alliance ... From the traditional perspective of balance-of-power theory, this situation is surely an anomaly. Power in the international system is about as unbalanced as it has ever been, yet balancing tendencies are remarkably mild. It is possible to find them, but one has to squint pretty hard to do it.

[N]o peer competitor has yet emerged more than a decade after the end of US-Soviet bipolarity to balance against the United States. Contrary to realist predictions, unipolarity has not provided the global alarm to restore a balance of power.

Resistance has in fact appeared and may be growing. But it is remarkable that despite the sharp shifts in the distribution of power, the other great powers have not yet responded in a way anticipated by balance-of-power theory.

Historically, major powers have rarely balanced against the United States and not at all since the 1990s when it has become the sole superpower.

Traditional balance of power theory … fails to explain state behavior in the post-Cold War era. Since the end of the Cold War, the United States has been expanding its economic and political power. More recently, it has begun to engage in increasingly unilateralist military policy… [Y]et despite these growing material capabilities, major powers such as China, France, Germany, India, and Russia have not responded with significant increases in their defense spending. Nor have they formed military coalitions to countervail US power, as the traditional balance of power theory would predict.

The end of the Cold War and the emergence of the "unipolar moment" have generated considerable debate about how to explain the absence of a great-power balancing coalition against the United States… That the United States, which is generally regarded as the "greatest superpower ever", has not provoked such a balancing coalition is widely regarded as a puzzle for the balance of power theory.

Whether or not realists got the Cold War right, they have most certainly got the warm peace wrong. A decade after the Berlin Wall collapsed… their dark vision of the future has not come to pass. The United States remains the world’s only superpower; unipolarity was not a fleeting moment ... Most importantly, despite its continued predominance and political activism, and the first rumbling of international opposition in response to missteps in Kosovo, no coalition has emerged to balance against it … [T]he United States today defies the supposedly immutable laws of realpolitik".

The persistence of American unipolar predominance in the international system since the end of the Cold War has caused a rupture in the American school of Realist … theory ... Yet the ongoing failure of potential rivals to the US, such as China, Russia, or the EU to develop military capabilities that come anywhere close to those of the US seems to have defied this prediction. Despite the apparently radical imbalance of the international political system, smaller states are not trying to build up their military power to match that of the US or forming formal alliance systems to oppose it… The absence of balancing against the US constitutes a serious anomaly for neorealist theory.

Fareed Zakaria asks, "Why is no one ganging up against the United States?" And John Ikenberry and John M. Owen ask the same question. Prominent Historian of the Cold War, John Lewis Gaddis, poses a more general question and replies: Do the weak always unite against the strong? "In theory, yes, but in practice and in history, not necessarily." One of the issues the discipline of political science "has been wrestling with recently is why there is still no anti-American coalition despite the overwhelming dominance of the United States since the end of the Cold War." French or Chinese officials publicly denounce "hyperpower" and aspire for "multipolarity" but refrain from forming a counterbalancing coalition. "Rhetorically, leaders and public want the United States to be balanced" but "we find very little balancing." French academic Michel Winock said: "Before we could say we were on American side. Not Now. There is no counterbalance." Two American Neoconservative thinkers, Robert Kagan and William Kristol, completely agree: "Today’s international system is built not around a balance of power but around American hegemony."

Christopher Layne published two articles on the post-Cold War case, "The Unipolar Illusion…" (1993) and "The Unipolar Illusion Revisited" (2006). The former predicted imminent anti-American balancing as the balance of power theorists expected; the latter explains "why balance of power theorists got it wrong."

Finally, Dall'Agnol analyzes, through a critical bias, the implications of unipolarity for balancing behavior. In order to do so, he discusses the dynamics of balance of power theory, assumed to be inoperative in the post-Cold War period by main academic debates over unipolarity: i) unipolar stability; ii) balance of threats; iii) soft balancing; iv) liberal institutionalism. He then argues that these approaches, including the unipolar illusion view, tied to the balance of power theory, overestimate the effects of unipolarity on balancing behavior of other states. Concluding that balance of power dynamics, especially those of hard balancing, are still observed in the post-Cold War era, he criticizes two main conclusions from the literature: i) that balancing became inoperative and; ii) that the only available strategies to other states are soft balancing and bandwagoning. In sum, this conclusion has directly implication on strategies available both to the United States and to its main competitors.

== Realism and balancing ==
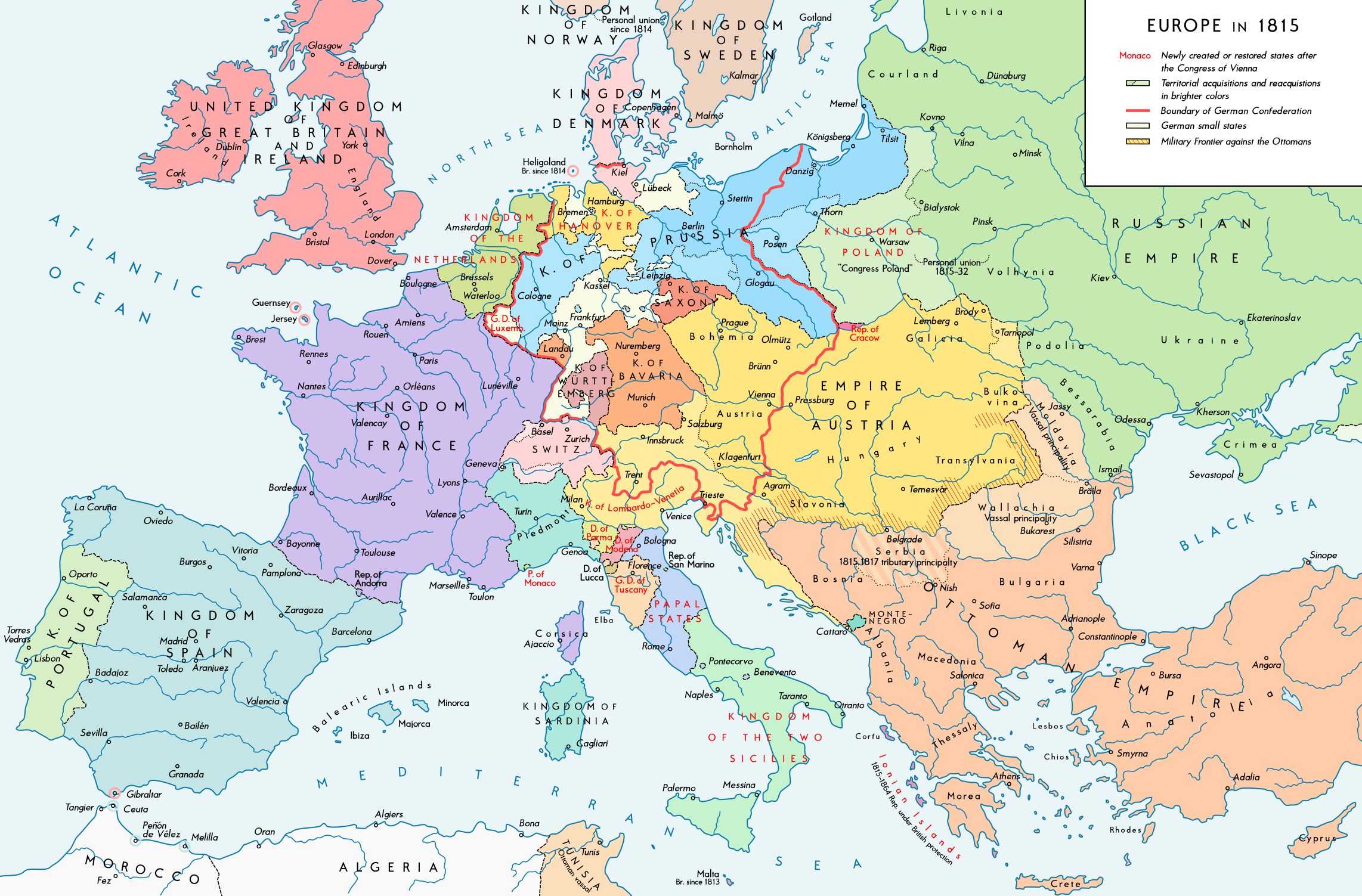
The many redrawn borders in Europe after the 1814–1815 Congress of Vienna represent a classic example of trying to achieve a European balance of power.

The balance of power theory is a core tenet of both classical and neorealist theory and seeks to explain alliance formation. Due to the neorealist idea of anarchism as a result of the international system, states must ensure their survival through maintaining or increasing their power in a self-help world. With no authority above the state to come to its rescue in the event of an attack by a hegemon, states attempt to prevent a potential hegemon from arising by balancing against it.

According to Kenneth Waltz, founder of neorealism, "balance-of-power politics prevail wherever two, and only two requirements are met: that the order be anarchic and that it be populated by units wishing to survive". They can do this either through "internal balancing", where a state uses internal efforts such as moving to increase economic capability, developing clever strategies and increasing military strength, or through "external balancing", which occurs when states take external measures to increase their security by forming allies. As states are assumed to be skeptical of the intentions of other states, neorealists primarily hold that states balance through "self-help", as they expand their military capabilities and copy military innovations of competitors.

States happy with their place in the system are known as "status quo" states, while those seeking to alter the balance of power in their favor are generally referred to as "revisionist states" and aspire for hegemony, thus repairing the balance.

== Balancing versus bandwagoning ==
States choose to balance for two reasons. First, they place their survival at risk if they fail to curb a potential hegemon before it becomes too strong; to ally with the dominant power means placing one's trust in its continued benevolence. Secondly, joining the weaker side increases the likelihood that the new member will be influential within the alliance.

States choose to bandwagon because it may be a form of appeasement as the bandwagoner may hope to avoid an attack by diverting it elsewhere—a defensive reason—or because it may align with the dominant side in wartime to share the spoils of victory—an offensive reason.

Realists claim that balancing is when states ally against the prevailing threat and results in a more secure world whereas in a bandwagoning world security is scarce as rising hegemons are not kept in check. With bandwagoning, the threatened state abandons hope of preventing the aggressor from gaining power at its expense and instead joins forces with its dangerous foe to get at least some small portion of the spoils of war.

The weaker the state the more likely it is to bandwagon than to balance as they do little to affect the outcome and thus must choose the winning side. Strong states may change a losing side into a winning side and thus are more likely to balance. States will be tempted to bandwagon when allies are unavailable, however excessive confidence in allied support encourages weak states to free ride relying on the efforts of others to provide security. Since bandwagoning "requires placing trust in the aggressors continued forbearance" some realists believe balancing is preferred to bandwagoning. According to Stephen Walt, states are more likely to balance in peacetime but if they are on the losing side of a war they may defect and bandwagon in the hopes that they will "share the fruits of victory".

== Chain ganging ==
Chain-ganging occurs when a state sees its own security tied to the security of its alliance partner. It chains itself by deeming any attack on its ally the equivalent of an attack on itself. That is another aspect of the balance of power theory, whereby the smaller states could drag their chained states into wars that they have no desire to fight. A key example was the chain-ganging between states prior to World War I, dragging most of Europe to war over a dispute between the relatively major power of Austria-Hungary and the minor power of Serbia. Thus, states "may chain themselves unconditionally to reckless allies whose survival is seen to be indispensable to the maintenance of the balance".

== Buck passing and bloodletting ==
Balancing and buck passing are the main strategies for preserving the balance of power and preventing a potential hegemon's rise. Instead of balancing against an aggressor, some states instead choose to "pass the buck" whereby instead of taking action to prevent a potential rise, it will pass the responsibility on to another state. John Mearsheimer, a prominent offensive realist, claims that threatened states can take four measures to facilitate buck passing, including: seeking good diplomatic relations with the aggressor in the hope that it will divert its attention to the "buck-catcher"; maintaining cool relations with the buck-catcher so as not to get dragged into the war with the buck-catcher and as a result possibly increase positive relations with the aggressor; increasing military strength to deter the aggressive state and help it focus on the buck-catcher; and facilitating the growth in power of the intended buck-catcher.

In the case that a state is an enemy with both the aggressor and the intended buck-catcher, a buck-passer can implement a bait and bleed strategy whereby the state causes two rivals to engage in a protracted war while the baiter remains on the sideline. This form of buck passing enables the state to increase in relative strength at the expense of the two rivals. Bloodletting, a further variant whereby a state does what it can to increase the cost duration of the conflict can further increase the buck-passer's relative power. Thus, threatened states usually prefer buck-passing to balancing as the buck-passer avoids the costs of fighting the aggressor in the event of war.

Some realists believe there is a strong tendency to buck-pass or free-ride within balancing coalitions themselves, usually leaving their alliance partners to assume the heavy burden of wearing down the enemy, leaving the free-rider's military fresh to win the final battles of the war and thus be in a better position to dictate the peace, such as the UK's light involvement in the early stages of World War I. Likewise, buck-passers can enter wars late after both sides have been worn down, allowing the buck-passer to dominate the post-war world.

A potential drawback of the strategy occurs if the buck-catcher fails to check the aggressor, as the buck-passer will be in a much more vulnerable situation. Proponents of the theory point to the Soviet Union's role in World War II whereby it passed the buck to the UK and France through the Molotov–Ribbentrop Pact with Nazi Germany. After eliminating France the Germans had no Western front to divide their forces, allowing them to concentrate their forces against the USSR.

According to a 2015 study, "the diplomatic record yields almost no examples of firm peacetime balancing coalitions over the past 200 years. When alliances have formed, great powers have generally doubted the reliability of their allies and of their opponents' allies."

== Offensive and defensive realism ==
=== Defensive realism ===
Defensive realists emphasize that if any state becomes too powerful, balancing will occur as other powers would build up their forces and form a balancing coalition. Because this resulting security dilemma would leave the aspiring hegemon less secure, defensive realists maintain that it is in a state's interest to maintain the status quo rather than maximize its power.

=== Offensive realism ===
Offensive realists accept that threatened states usually balance against dangerous foes, however, they maintain that balancing is often inefficient and that this inefficiency provides opportunities for a clever aggressor to take advantage of its adversaries. Buck passing, rather than joining a balancing coalition, is another tactic offensive realists point to when disputing the balance of power theory.

Offensive realists believe that internal balancing measures such as increasing defense spending, implementing conscription, are only effective to a certain extent as there are usually significant limits on how many additional resources a threatened state can muster against an aggressor. However, since offensive realists theorize that states are always seeking to maximize their power, states are "effectively engaged in internal balancing all the time".

== Balance of threat ==
The balance of threat theory is an offshoot of neorealism, coined in 1985 by Stephen M. Walt in an attempt to explain why balancing against rising hegemons has not always been consistent in history. In contrast to traditional balance of power theorists, Walt suggests that states balance against threats, rather than against power alone. The "balance-of-power theory is not wrong; it is merely incomplete. Power is one of the factors that affect the propensity to balance, although it is not the only one nor always the most important." The theory acknowledges that power is an extremely important factor in the level of threat posed by a state, but also includes geographic proximity, offensive capabilities, and perceived intentions. Balance of threat theory is an interesting adjunct to neorealism, because as a structural theory, neorealism only predicts that balances of power will form, not whether a particular state will balance or bandwagon (inter alia), or which state it might balance with. As Waltz put it: "balance of power theory is often criticized because it does not explain the particular policies of states. True, the theory does not tell us why state X made a certain move last Tuesday. To expect it to do so would be like expecting the theory of universal gravitation to explain the wayward pattern of a falling leaf. A theory a one level of generality cannot answer questions about matters at a different level of generality." Walt's balance of threat formulation allows neorealism to serve as the foundation for a theory of foreign policy, thus allowing it to explain or predict which potential threats a state is most likely to balance against.

== Soft balancing ==
Soft balancing was developed in the 2000s to account for the contemporary anomaly of the unipolar unbalanced world.

Thomas Mowle and David Sacko describe "soft balancing" as "balancing that does not balance at all." These theoretical efforts are counter-productive, since Realism and unipolarity are compatible and structural realism should rather develop a set of hypotheses for a unipolar world: "Scholars do not need to desperately search for signs of balancing, they do not need to soften balancing beyond recognition, and they do not need to stand to watch for the first glimmering of a new multipolar dawn."

Campbell Craig explained the development of soft balancing theory on the Thomas Kuhn's three-stage model how scholarly communities respond to anomalies that seem clearly to defy their core theoretical predictions:

1. Leading theorists wedded to the standard interpretations that allow them to dominate their field, tend first to deny that the anomaly exists; at most, it is a 'blip', an unimportant or transient factor. Initially, structural Realists sought to deny that unipolarity was enduring or important, and predicted its quick demise. Waltz, Mearsheimer, and Layne all predicted in the early 1990s that other powers would soon emerge to balance the US.

2. As the salience of the anomaly becomes undeniable, theoreticians redefine or shift their theoretical expectations, so as to contend that the anomaly can indeed be explained by their original theory even if their earlier writings ruled it out. More recently, many structural Realists have acknowledged the existence of unipolarity, or at least have acknowledged the absence of traditional balancing against the US, but have altered standard definitions of balancing behavior in order to reconcile this with balance-of-power theory. Thus, Mearsheimer suggested that Iran and North Korea are balancing, even though the "balance" is not in sight.

3. Finally, a band of younger scholars, less invested professionally in the old theory, develops a new interpretation that not only explains the anomaly but places it at its theoretical center. This new theoretical interpretation supersedes the old one and becomes the new 'paradigm' for successive inquiry. In this manner, Robert Pape, T. V. Paul, and Stephen Walt concede that traditional balancing is not occurring, but argue nevertheless that rivals to the US are engaging in 'soft balancing.'

More recent scholarly work has engaged the debate on soft balancing. Kai He suggested a new analytical framework, a negative balancing model, to explain why states do not form alliances or conduct arms races to balance against power or threats as they may have done in the past. He describes negative balancing as any strategy or diplomatic efforts aimed to undermine a rival's power. In contrast, positive balancing is actions or policies designed to strengthen a state's own power in world politics.

== Preponderance of power ==
The preponderance of power has been suggested as an alternative to the balance of power since World War II. In his 1940 article, "War, Peace and the Balance of Power", Frederick L. Schuman included a chapter titled "Necessity for Preponderance of Power". It argued:

[A]n overwhelming preponderance of power [...] will remain wholly unattainable unless the Allies win the present war and the United States assumes responsibilities commensurate with its power—in the war, in the peace after the war and in the maintenance and improvement of the new order after the peace. The necessary preponderance of power is unlikely to emerge from any international combination other than a permanent alliance of the United States, the British Commonwealth of Nations, and the French Republic, with the addition of such Latin American states and such European democracies as may care to join. Such a coalition, if stable and permanent, could put an end to the world balance of power and oblige outside powers to abandon the game of power politics. No other coalition presently in prospect would seem to offer any comparable hope.

In 1941, Alfred Vagts wrote an article, titled "The United States and the Balance of Power," in which he recalled the words of Thomas Jefferson:

I wish that all nations may recover and retain their independence; that those which are overgrown may not advance beyond safe measure of power, that a salutary balance may ever be maintained among nations and that our peace, commerce, and friendship, may be sought and cultivated by all.... Not in our day, but at no distant one, we may shake a rod over the heads of all, which may make the stoutest of them tremble.

In 1942, Robert Strausz-Hupé found that it "is in the interests of the United States no less than that of humanity" that the United States should be the only one "geographical power nucleus" from which a "balancing and stabilizing" power of arbiter be exercised. This "will pave the way for a new and universal order." Writing the same year in Life magazine, Joseph Thorndike tells about "many observers" seeking "preponderant power in the postwar world" to replace balance of power:

The balance of power is indeed the time-honored (or dishonored) policy of the European states. But it is not the only policy which has been historically successful. Rome was not a balance of power. It was a preponderant power. There are many observers who think the US and the British Empire, acting together, can hold preponderant power in the postwar world. At the time of the peace conference, this may well be the case.

However, Thorndike added in the same 1942 article, many may wonder whether, over the years, Russia and China "will not rival Anglo-America". The following year, the founder of the Paneuropean Union, Richard von Coudenhove-Kalergi, also invoked the example of the two-centuries-long "Pax Romana" which, he suggested, could be repeated if based on the preponderant US air power and inter-regional organization:

At the end of the war the crushing superiority of American plane production will be an established fact… The solution of the problem … is by no means ideal, nor even satisfactory. But it is a minor evil, compared with the alternative of several competing air forces fighting each other… [in wars] aimed not at the conquest but at the utter annihilation of all enemy towns and lands… This danger can … only be prevented by the air superiority of a single power … This is the only realistic hope for a lasting peace … The peaceful organization of the postwar world would rest on a double basis: on the working Commonwealth of the World, established on regional grounds, and on the American supremacy in the skies, making international wars almost impossible… This double-method … can lead to a long period of peace and prosperity throughout the globe…

The same year, Nathaniel Peffer criticized the idea of the preponderance of power:

Whatever may be the tendencies and inclinations, it must be emphasized that if America seeks to dictate to other powers their actions and policies, it can do so only by maintaining a preponderance of power manifested in an extension of political and economic control … But in the light of all recent history he who would consciously, deliberately elect that course is either unread, incapable of deductions from his reading or perverse.

In self-contradiction, Peffer ended the article recommending for the postwar period a preponderance of power of offensive kind backed by total national effort: The United States will need "a larger permanent military establishment," alliances with other powers having common interests and an alliance with Great Britain that would be not only defensive but also "outright, unconditional offensive." It means full-scale power politics and to it "must be accommodated and sometimes subordinated everything else in the nation’s life."

On 24 September 1946, Truman's Special Counsel Clark M. Clifford submitted a report "American Relations with the Soviet Union…" advocating a preponderant power:

It must be made apparent to the Soviet Government that our strength will be sufficient to repel any attack and sufficient to defeat the USSR decisively if a war should start. The prospect of defeat is the only sure means of deterring the Soviet Union.

In the early Cold War, US Secretary of State Dean Acheson combined the concepts of preponderance and bandwagoning. As he put it, the United States was going to have to be "the locomotive at the head of mankind," while the rest of the world was going to be "the caboose."

While arguing that equilibrium was essential to justice, Reinhold Niebuhr asserted that "nothing but the preponderance of power in the non-Communist world can preserve the peace."

Melvyn Leffler describes the US strategy throughout the Cold War as a strategy of preponderance. In its last year, he summarized: Backed by strategic preponderance, the United States integrated and rearmed the Eurasian industrial areas, shored up the Eurasian periphery and rolled back the Iron Curtain.

Already during the Cold War, some scholars stressed that the pattern accords the preponderance of power rather than balance of power. The balance of power presupposes such a distribution of power in the system that no single state is preponderant. In this sense, during the period 1945–1965 if "there was any threat to the general balance of power [...] it was from the United States rather than from the Soviet Union that this came."

Stephen Walt observed in the 1980s that most states, including all developed states, ally with, rather than balance against, the preponderant power. Noting this "anomaly", Walt suggested his balance of threat hypothesis:

At first glance, this result would seem to contradict the assertion that states choose alliance partners in order to balance against the strongest. Focusing solely on aggregate power would lead us to expect more states to ally with the Soviet Union, in order to prevent the United States from using its superior overall resources in harmful ways. Judging from the preponderance of aggregate power favoring the West, many states appear to have 'bandwagoned' rather than balanced by aligning with the United States. This is even more striking when one remembers that the United States was overwhelmingly the world's most powerful country in the immediate postwar period, yet was able to bring most of the other industrial powers into alignment with rather than against it.

In 1986, still not envisaging the end of the Cold War in sight, Zbigniew Brzezinski emphasized the historical uniqueness of the current period regarding the preponderance of power: "[N]ever before would the eclipse of one of the major rival powers have given to the other effective global preponderance." Shortly after one of the rival superpowers eclipsed, the Pentagon Regional Defense Strategy (1992) formulized: "It is not in our interest … to return to earlier periods in which multiple military powers balanced one against another in what passed for security structures, while regional or even global peace hang in the balance."

In the first post-Cold War year, Leffler advocated for the United States to continue its strategy of "preponderance of power". Christopher Layne claims that the preponderance of power has been the dominant US strategy during both the Cold War and the post-Cold War periods. "Preponderance's strategic imperatives are the same as they were during the post-World War II era: pacification and reassurance in Europe and East Asia, and protection of these regions from instability in the periphery." The post-Cold War strategy of preponderance holds that "only a preponderance of US power ensures peace" which is "the result of an imbalance of power in which US capabilities are sufficient, operating on their own, to cow all potential challengers and to comfort all coalition partners. It is not enough consequently to be primus inter pares [...] One must be primus solus."

Layne since the beginning of the post-Cold war period expects the preponderance of power to trigger counterbalancing. He finds that "it was the bipolar structure of the postwar system that allowed Washington to pursue a strategy of preponderance successfully" and thereby smother the emergence of other great powers. But the preponderance of power which "others found merely irritating in a bipolar world may seem quite threatening in a unipolar world." Because of these structural factors, "an American strategy of preponderance [...] is doomed to failure"; it will "cause other states to balance against the United States".

Overturning the scholarly conventional wisdom, however, the current preponderant power seems to render inoperative the counterbalancing long central to research in international relations. By the preponderance of American power and the absence of balance of power William Wohlforth explains the peacefulness and stability of the present world order. No distribution of power rules out war. "The greater the preponderance of power, however, the more extreme the values of other variables must be to produce war [...]" Campbell Craig believes that "Power Preponderance theory" will become one of the dominant American IR schools of the post-Cold War era:

...Power Preponderance is going to replace balance-of-power neorealism and become the dominant brand of American Realism for the foreseeable future. Unipolarity is too central of a problem for neorealism to finesse, especially as confident predictions of its early demise have been proven wrong and the gap between the US and other rivals continues to grow.

Expecting anti-American balancing, Waltz drew a much-cited analogy: "As nature abhors vacuum, so international politics abhors unbalanced power." Craig paraphrased:

Theory abhors an explanatory vacuum, and Power Preponderance is filling it. The essence of Power Preponderance is its claim that would-be rivals have strong incentives to accept the status quo of American primacy rather than to attempt to overturn the unipolar order… The argument … distinguishes itself from deterministic claims made by some structural realists that a balance of power is certain to recur...

US National Security Strategy of 2002 uses repeatedly the term 'balance of power' favoring freedom. The author of the Preponderance of Power… (1992), Melvyn Leffler, was puzzled: A balance of power is linked historically to the evolution of the Westphalian state system and "envisions equilibrium, while the Bush administration yearns for hegemony." When they invoke the language of power balancing, Bush's advisers obfuscate more than they clarify:

Whose power is to be balanced? Today, no nation or group challenges American power … In fact, should the balance of power operate in its classical form, it would trigger countermoves by states seeking to pose a counterweight to America's expressed ambitions.

According to Leffler's exegesis, Bush has invoked a balance of power vocabulary in purpose to integrate the tradition with the hegemonic dilemma. British Orwell Prize-winning policy analyst, Anatol Lieven, comments: In this conception, however, a phrase "was a form of Orwellian doublespeak. The clear intention actually was to be so strong that other countries had no choice but to rally to the side of the United States, concentrating all real power and freedom of action in the hands of America." The surprising rehabilitation of the balance-of-power term in the 2002 NSS "can be accounted for in terms of mythopoetic function that the terminology serves in the document." It keeps alive the traditional concept in a new unipolar world.

Eventually, explanation what implies "the balance of power favoring freedom" was dropped by "US National Security and Defense Strategies" of 2018: The Pentagon will ensure that the United States remain the "preeminent military power in the world," and the regional "balances of power remain in our favor." [Emphasis added] The "balance of power favoring freedom" appeared identical with the balance of power favoring "us."

Russian President Vladimir Putin complained: "Instead of establishing a new balance of power … they [the United States] took steps that threw the [international] system into sharp and deep imbalance."

In 1826, George Canning "called the new world into existence to redress the balance of the old". In 1898, Theodore Roosevelt found that the United States had become "more and more the balance of power of the whole globe." In 1941, a New Deal Economist with the National Resources Planning Board, Otto T. Mallery, averred that "destiny offers to the United States the ultimate balance of power and of resources in the world after the war." Colin Gray titled his 2005 chapter by question, "Where Is the Balance of Power?" The chapter opens: "The short answer is that the United States is the balance of power."

== See also ==
- Balance of terror
- Balance of threat
- Mutual assured destruction – a theory in which two or more states are balanced by their ability to effectively completely destroy each other
- Negarchy
- Offshore balancing
- Peace through strength
- Polarity (international relations)
- Soft balancing
- Sphere of influence
- Superpower
- Strategic autonomy

In history:

- Age of Metternich
- Iran–Iraq War
