= Neoclassical realism =

Belief that human nature and state competitiveness dominate international relations

Neoclassical realism is a theory of international relations and an approach to foreign policy analysis. Initially coined by Gideon Rose in a 1998 World Politics review article, it is a combination of classical realist and neorealist – particularly defensive realist – theories.

The development of neoclassical realism is associated with foreign policy analyses that examine states’ foreign policy behavior not only through the structural characteristics of the international system but also through the interaction between systemic conditions and domestic dynamics. Within this approach, the explanation of states’ foreign policy choices takes into account the distribution of power at the international system level, as well as the political, social, and institutional characteristics of states.

In the neoclassical realist approach, domestic political variables emphasized by Innenpolitik approaches are generally given a secondary role in explaining foreign policy behavior. The approach is based on the view that, in the long term, states’ foreign policy behavior is shaped by the opportunities provided and constraints imposed by the international system. Accordingly, the influence of the international system on state behavior constitutes an important element of neoclassical realist analysis .

== Overview ==
While holding true to the realist concept of balance of power, neoclassical realism adds that states' inability to perceive one another accurately, and/or state leaders' inability to mobilize state power and public support, can result in suboptimal foreign policy, the rise and fall of great powers, and war. There are four variations of a state's balancing behavior:

- Appropriate balancing occurs when a state correctly perceives another state's intentions and balances accordingly. Neoclassical realists disagree whether this optimal behavior is fairly standard or actually quite rare. Ripsman, Taliaferro and Lobell suggest that whether states correctly perceive their international environment may depend, for example, on the relative level, clarity and directness of existing threats.
- Overbalancing occurs when a state incorrectly perceives another state as threatening, and uses more resources than it needs to in order to balance.
- Underbalancing occurs when a state fails to balance, out of either inefficiency or incorrectly perceiving a state as less of threat than it actually is.
- Nonbalancing occurs when a state avoids balancing through buck passing, bandwagoning, or other escapes. A state may choose to do this for a number of reasons, including an inability to balance.

According to Nicholas Ross Smith of University of Nottingham Ningbo China, Neoclassical realism has primarily been criticized for its "apparent ontological and epistemological incoherence". A 1995 study criticized Neoclassical realism for encompassing "nearly the entire universe of international relations theory" and stretching realism "beyond all recognition or utility." According to Stephen Walt of the Kennedy School at Harvard University, one of the chief flaws in Neoclassical realism is that it "tends to incorporate domestic variables in an ad hoc manner, and its proponents have yet to identify when these variables have greater or lesser influence".

Neoclassical realism has been used to explain a number of puzzling foreign policy cases, such as the volatility in South Korea-Japan relations, Fascist Italy's foreign policy, Slobodan Milosevic's decision-making during the 1999 Kosovo crisis, the occurrence of the Cod Wars between Iceland and the United Kingdom, and Iran's foreign policy choices after the American invasions of Afghanistan and Iraq. Proponents of the theory argue that the theory is particularly valuable in explaining cases that fly in the face of other international relations theories, due to its incorporation of domestic variables.

== Notable neoclassical realists ==
Persons mentioned as neoclassical realists, and the year of the release of the work associated with this classification include:

- Jack Snyder (1991)
- William Wohlforth (1993)
- Thomas J. Christensen (1996)
- Jennifer Sterling-Folker (1997)
- Gideon Rose (1998)
- Randall Schweller (1998)
- Fareed Zakaria (1998)
- Robert Jervis (1999)
- Anders Wivel (2005)
- Colin Dueck (2006)
- Jeffrey W. Taliaferro (2006 )
- Norrin Ripsman (2009)
- Steven Lobell (2009)
- Asle Toje (2010)
- Tom Dyson (2010)
- Nicholas Kitchen (2010)
- Yan Xuetong (2011)
- Robert Wishart (2013)
- Michiel Foulon (2015)
- Elias Götz (2019)
- Henrik Larsen (2019)
- Gustav Meibauer (2020)

== See also ==
- War termination
