= Negarchy =

Negarchy is a term coined by Daniel Deudney to mean a form of status quo maintained by the interrelations of the power structure and authority that modern states hold in relation to one another, which negate one another because of their respective influence. Negarchy is described as being a form of governing between "anarchy and hierarchy". In response to the increased military and nuclear capacities of major states, as well as the likely increase in their respective capacities to enact violence due to impending space expansionism, Deudney argues that the cooperative establishment of "mutual restraints," could function as a sort-of global federalism. Deudney poses negarchy as a favorable outcome in opposition to the potential for global hierarchy created by space expansion.

== See also ==
- Anarchy in international relations
- Balance of power in international relations
- Complex adaptive system
- Complex interdependence
- Coopetition
- Separation of powers
