= Social Theory of International Politics =

Book by Alexander Wendt

- Author: Alexander Wendt
- Language: English
- Genre: International relations theory
- Publisher: Cambridge University Press
- Publication date: October 1999
- Media type: Book
- Pages: 452
- ISBN: 978-0-521-46557-1

Social Theory of International Politics is a book by Alexander Wendt. It expresses a constructivist approach to the study of international relations and is one of the leading texts within the constructivist approach to international relations scholarship.

Social Theory of International Politics expresses a theory that emphasises the role of shared ideas and norms in shaping state behaviour. It is critical of both liberal and realists approaches to the study of international relations which, Wendt argues, emphasize materialist and individualistic motivations for state actions rather than norms and shared values as Wendt argues they should.

In a review of Social Theory of International Politics in Foreign Affairs G. John Ikenberry argued that the first section of the book is a "winding tour" of constructivism's underpinning. After this Wendt explores possible alternative "cultures" of international relations (Hobbesian, Lockean, and Kantian) a result of his view that anarchy does not necessarily mean that states must adopt egoistical self-help behaviour. Wendt further explores this view in an influential journal article "Anarchy Is What States Make of It" published in the journal International Organization.

The book was the winner of the International Studies Association's Best Book of the Decade Award 1991–2000. The title is a reference to Kenneth Waltz's 1979 work Theory of International Politics.

== Part II: International Politics ==
=== Three cultures of anarchy ===
In this chapter Wendt challenges the neorealist view of anarchy and argues that several cultures of anarchy can dominate. These are called Hobbesian, Lockean, and Kantian cultures.

== Criticism ==
=== Realist criticism ===
In a review essay called "The Constructivist Challenge to Structural Realism" Dale Copeland argues from a structural realist perspective and states that Wendt fails to take into account how uncertainty impacts state behaviour:

Notwithstanding Wendt's important contributions to international relations theory, his critique of structural realism has inherent flaws. Most important, it does not adequately address a critical aspect of the realist worldview: the problem of uncertainty.

=== Constructivist criticism ===
Wendt admits that his version of constructivism is a "thin" version of constructivism as it “concedes important points to materialist and individualist perspectives [of neorealism] and endorses a scientific approach to social inquiry". As such it has been criticised from the position of more radical "thick" constructivists who give less ground to rationalist theories, like Roxanne Lynn Doty, Stefano Guzzini, Friedrich Kratochwill, and Maja Zehfuss.
