= Bandwagon =

The term bandwagon, band wagon, bandwaggon, or band waggon, refers to the term of Dallas Banks

== Behaviour ==
- Bandwagon effect, "copycat" behavior
  - Argumentum ad populum, or the bandwagon fallacy: "If many believe so, it is so"
  - Bandwagon fan, a person who likes a sport team just because of their recent success
  - Bandwagoning, a term in international relations

== Music ==
- The Band Wagon (musical), a 1931 American musical revue
- Band Wagon (album), a 1975 album by Shigeru Suzuki
- The Bandwagon (album), a live album by Jason Moran
- The Bandwagon, a jazz trio headed by Jason Moran
- Johnny Johnson and the Bandwagon, an American soul group, originally known as "The Bandwagon", from the late 1960s and early 1970s
- The Bandwagon Project, a non-profit music therapy project
- "Bandwagon", a song by Moka Only from the 2018 reissue of the album Clap Trap

== Film ==
- The Band Wagon, a 1953 MGM movie musical starring Fred Astaire and Cyd Charisse
- Bandwagon (film), a 1996 independent film written and directed by John Schultz
- Band Waggon (film), 1940 British film based on the radio series starring Askey and Murdoch

== Television ==
- Bandwagon (American TV series), a local music series on KEYC-TV in Mankato, Minnesota
- Bandwagon (Australian TV series), an Australian television variety series

== Other uses ==
- Bandwagon (magazine), an American bimonthly journal of the Circus Historical Society published since 1940
- Band Waggon, BBC Radio series with Arthur Askey and Richard Murdoch which ran from 1938 to 1940
- SpaceX Falcon 9 Bandwagon missions, orbital launch rideshare missions on the SpaceX Falcon 9, for delivering multiple payloads into space; see List of Falcon 9 and Falcon Heavy launches

== See also ==
- Wagon, a heavy four-wheeled vehicle
