= Balance of threat =

Theory in international relations

The balance of threat theory was proposed by Stephen Walt in his article Alliance Formation and the Balance of World Power, published in the journal International Security in 1985. He elaborated it in his book, The Origins of Alliances (1987). The theory modified the popular balance of power theory in the neorealist school of international relations.

According to the balance of threat theory, the alliance behavior of states is determined by the threat that they perceive from other states. Walt contends that states generally balance by allying against a perceived threat, while very weak states are more likely to bandwagon with the rising threat to protect their own national security. He points to the example of the alliance patterns of European states before and during World War I and World War II, when nations with a significantly-greater combined power allied against the recognized threat of German expansionism.

Walt identifies four criteria states use to evaluate the threat posed by another state: aggregate strength or power, including size, population, latent power, and economic capability; geographic proximity; offensive capability; and offensive or hostile intention. He argues that insofar as other states view an emerging power as possessing those qualities, they are likely to view it as a threat and balance against it.

The balance of threat theory modified realism (and the neorealism of Kenneth Waltz) by separating power from threat. In the balance of power theory, which had previously dominated realist analyses, states balance against others whose power (military capabilities) was rising. Greater power was assumed to reflect offensive intentions. Walt argues that not to be borne out by empirical evidence and that the balance of threat theory, in which states will not balance against those that are rising in power but do not display offensive intentions, gives a better account of the evidence. For instance, the United States was more powerful than the other superpower, the Soviet Union, during the Cold War, but contrary to the balance of power theory, more states (members of NATO) allied with it than with the Soviet Union because the United States displayed intentions that were much less aggressive toward them than those displayed by the Soviet Union.

The flaw of the balance of power theory became even more striking after the disappearance of the Soviet threat. With its power unbalanced, Walt argued in 2004 that the United States is still formally allied with NATO, Japan, South Korea, and several other countries, and he hints that the US might withdraw its forces, which still tend to provoke requests for a continued US presence. Counterbalancing coalitions predicted by the balance of power theory hardly appeared:

Responses to U.S. primacy pale in comparison to self-defeating self-encirclement that Wilhelmine Germany or the Soviet Union provoked, cases where most of the other major powers made formal or informal alliances to contain or defeat these powerful expansionist states … To date, at least, there is little sign of a serious effort to forge a meaningful anti-American alliance.... Instead of facing a combined coalition of major powers, united by a common desire to contain American power, the main adversaries of the United States have been the isolated and oppressive regimes... that possess little power and even less international support. With enemies like these, one might ask, who needs friends? From the traditional perspective of balance-of-power theory, this situation is surely an anomaly. Power in the international system is about as unbalanced as it has ever been, yet balancing tendencies are remarkably mild. It is possible to find them, but one has to squint pretty hard to do it.... The anomaly of states failing to balance U.S. power vanishes when we focus not on power but on threats. Although the United States is enormously powerful relative to other states, it has not been perceived as a major threat by most other powers.

== See also ==
- Balance of power (international relations)
- Balance of terror
- Balancing (international relations)
- Bandwagoning
- Peace through strength
