= Norrin M. Ripsman =

Canadian political scientist

Education
- Education: University of Toronto (BA & MA); University of Pennsylvania (PhD)
- Thesis: Democratic Institutions and the Governance of Foreign Security Policy: Peacemaking after Two World Wars (1997)
- Academic advisors: John Ikenberry, Daniel Deudney, Marc Trachtenberg

Philosophical work
- Era: 21st century
- School: Neoclassical realism
- Institutions: Lehigh University
- Language: Full research ability in English and French
- Main interests: national security; international security; international relations theory; foreign policy analysis
- Notable works: Neoclassical Realism, the State, and Foreign Policy (2009); Neoclassical Realist Theory of International Politics (2016)
- Notable ideas: theory of structural autonomy (2002)

Norrin M. Ripsman is a Canadian political scientist whose research mainly examines security, regional peacemaking, and neoclassical realism. Before 2016, he taught at Concordia University, Quebec, Canada. Since 2016, he has been Monroe J. Rathbone Professor in the International Relations Department at Lehigh University, Pennsylvania, US.

== Biography ==
=== Education ===
Ripsman earned a bachelor's degree and a master's degree in Political science from University of Toronto in 1989 and 1990 and received his PhD in Political Science at the University of Pennsylvania in 1997.

=== Academic career ===
From 1998 to 1999, he was a Postdoctoral Fellow at Mershon Center for International Security, Ohio State University. From 1999 to 2001, Ripsman worked at Department of Political Science, Dalhousie University as a visiting assistant professor.

From 2000 to 2016, Ripsman worked at Department of Political Science, Concordia University as an assistant professor (2000–4), associate professor (2004–10) and professor (2010–16). During this 16-year period, he was a research fellow of International Security Program at Harvard Kennedy School of Government (2011) and a visiting scholar at University of Melbourne (2006–7) and Northern Illinois University (2012–13).

== Theoretical contribution to neoclassical realism ==
Ripsman co-edited/co-authored Neoclassical Realism, the State, and Foreign Policy (2009) and Neoclassical Realist Theory of International Politics (2016), which develop neoclassical realist theory in international relations, with Jeffrey W. Taliaferro and Steven E. Lobell.

Ripsman wrote an entry entitled Neoclassical Realism for the Oxford Research Encyclopedia of International Studies in 2011.

== Publications ==
=== Monographs ===
- Peacemaking from Above, Peace from Below: States, Societies, and Peacemaking Between Regional Rivals (Cornell University Press, 2016)
- Peacemaking by Democracies: The Effect of State Autonomy on the Post-World-War Settlements (Penn State University Press, 2002)

=== Co-authored books ===
- Neoclassical Realist Theory of International Politics (Oxford University Press, 2016)
- Economic Statecraft and Foreign Policy (Routledge, 2013)
- Globalization and the National Security State (Oxford University Press, 2010)

=== Edited volumes ===
- The Political Economy of Regional Peacemaking (University of Michigan Press, 2016)
- The Challenge of Grand Strategy (Cambridge University Press, 2012)
- Neoclassical Realism, the State, and Foreign Policy (Cambridge University Press, 2009)
- Power and the Purse: Economic Statecraft, Interdependence, and International Conflict (Frank Cass, 2000).

=== Selected articles ===
Ripsman has published peer-reviewed articles in International Security, International Studies Quarterly, Security Studies, Millennium: A Journal of International Studies, International Interactions, International Studies Review, Geopolitics, International Journal, and The Canadian Journal of Political Science.
