= Rio Valley Switching Company =

Short-line railroad in Texas, U.S.

The Rio Valley Switching Company (reporting mark RVSC) is a short-line railroad headquartered in McAllen, Texas.

RVSC operates four lines, all leased from Union Pacific:

- A 41-mile line from an interchange with Union Pacific at Harlingen, Texas to an interchange with Border Pacific Railroad at Mission, Texas (began operating in March 1993)
- An 8.1-mile branch from Mission to Hidalgo, Texas (began operating in March 1993)
- A 12.8-mile branch from McAllen to Edinburg, Texas (began operating in September 1997)
- An 11.4-mile branch from Harlingen to Rogers Lacy, Texas (began operating in November 2004)

RVSC traffic includes paper, agricultural products, lumber, bulk plastics, steel, scrap metals, cottonseed, corn sweetener, lime, cement, canned goods, frozen food, and aggregates.

RVSC provides South Texas and Mexican border haulage and cross-dock services through its sister company, Border Transload & Transfer, Inc.
