= Global Research Network on Peaceful Change =

International research consortium

- Abbreviation: GRENPEC
- Formation: March 2019
- Founder: T. V. Paul
- Founded at: Toronto, Canada
- Type: Academic research network
- Region served: International
- Website: grenpec.com

Global Research Network on Peaceful Change (GRENPEC) is an international academic consortium founded in March 2019 by T. V. Paul to study and promote non‑violent institutional transformation in global, regional, and domestic politics. It maintains research partnerships with academic institutions and projects worldwide, including the S. Rajaratnam School of International Studies in Singapore, and the Peace Research Center Prague at Charles University and the Centre for International Peace and Security Studies (CIPSS) at McGill University.

== History and development ==
GRENPEC grew out of the International Studies Association’s 2017 conference theme, “Change in World Politics,” held during T. V. Paul’s ISA presidency. In March 2019, it was launched at the International Studies Association Annual Convention in Toronto, where the founding members established a steering committee and outlined objectives for joint workshops, panels, and publications.

== Key publications and activities ==
- International Organizations and Peaceful Change in World Politics (Cambridge University Press, 2025)
- Peaceful Change in International Relations workshop, Stanford CISAC (Spring 2023).
- The Oxford Handbook of Peaceful Change in International Relations (Oxford University Press, 2021)
- Roundtable: International Institutions and Peaceful Change, Ethics & International Affairs, Vol. 34 No. 4 (Winter 2020), pp. 457–545.
