= The European Union as a Small Power =

Book by Asle Toje

The European Union as a small power - after the post Cold War
- Author: Asle Toje
- Language: English
- Genre: International Relations, History
- Publisher: Palgrave Macmillan
- Publication date: 2010
- Publication place: United States
- Media type: Print (Hardback)
- Pages: 264
- ISBN: 978-0-230-24396-5
- OCLC: 15594794
- Dewey Decimal: 909.82 19
- LC Class: D210 .K46 1987

The European Union as a small power - after the post Cold War, by Asle Toje, first published in 2010, explores the politics and security of the Small Powers from the Late Middle Ages to 1945 and the reason for their decline. It then continues by forecasting the position of the European Union (EU) for the first decades on the 2000s.

== Summary ==
The EU is a response to and function of Europe's unique historical experience. The past decade has shown that there is policy space for greater EU engagement in European security, although the EU has not been able to play all roles with the same degree of accomplishment.

There are particular concerns over its security and defence dimension where attempts at pooling resources and forming a political consensus have failed to generate the results expected. These trends, combined with shifts in global power patterns, have been accompanied by a shift in EU strategic thinking whereby great-power ambitions have been scaled down and replaced by a tendency towards hedging vis-à-vis the leading powers.

On an operational level the track record shows that the EU's effectiveness is hampered by a "consensus– expectations gap", owing primarily to the lack of an effective decision-making mechanism. The sum of these developments is that the EU will not be a great power, and is taking the place of one of the small powers in the emerging multipolar international order.(summarized on page 11).

== Critiques ==
The book received warm reviews from Robert Kagan: "The great strength of Asle's Toje absorbing study is to show what role the European Union might be expected to play under multipolarity..." The Economist chose the book as one of its "Recommended Reading for the beach", and Philip Stephens in The Financial Times writes: "In a striking analysis of foreign and security policy hum the opening Decade of the century, Asle Toje, a scholar that Norway's Nobel Institute, concludes That Europe Has Been showing all the Characteristics of a small power - or Rather of a series of small powers as The Limited Influence of the Union co-exists with the constrained power of France, Britain and Germany".
