= T. V. Paul =

Canadian political scientist

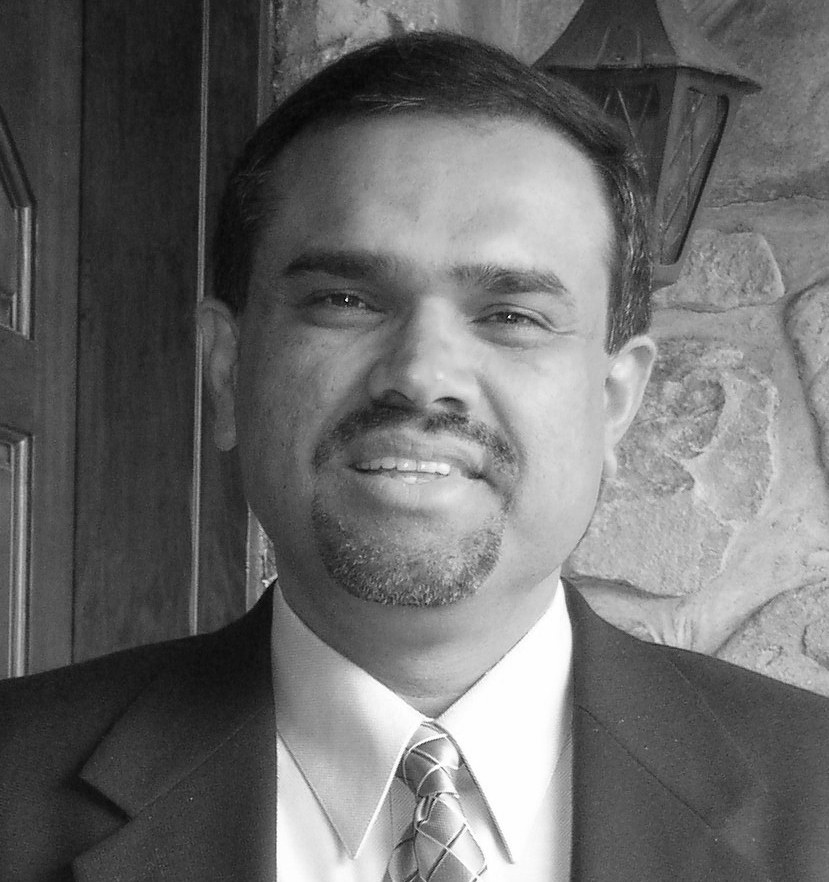
- Education: Kerala University (BA); Jawaharlal Nehru University (MPhil); UCLA (PhD)
- Known for: The tradition of non-use of nuclear weapons · Soft balancing · Complex Deterrence · Asymmetric warfare
- Scientific career
- Fields: Political Science; International Relations; International Security; War & Conflict; Nuclear proliferation South Asia
- Workplaces: McGill University
- Website: https://www.tvpaul.com

Thazha Varkey Paul (born in 1956) is an Indo-Canadian political scientist. He is a Distinguished James McGill professor of International Relations in the department of Political Science at McGill University. Paul specializes in International Relations, especially international security, regional security and South Asia. He is most notable for his work on asymmetric warfare, soft balancing, and deterrence theory. He has also contributed to the literatures on nuclear non-proliferation, and South Asian security. He served as the president of the International Studies Association (ISA) during 2016–2017, and served as the founding director of both the McGill University – Université de Montreal Centre for International Peace and Security Studies (CIPSS), and the Global Research Network on Peaceful Change (GRENPEC).

== Background ==
Paul was born in Kerala, India. Paul received his undergraduate education from Kerala University, India in 1977. He completed his M. Phil in international studies at Jawaharlal Nehru University, New Delhi, in 1984. He subsequently earned a PhD in political science from the University of California, Los Angeles in 1991.

== Career ==
In 1991, the same year that he completed his doctoral studies, he joined the faculty at McGill University. In 1996, alongside Michel Fortmann from the University of Montreal, he founded the Centre for International Peace and Security Studies (CIPSS), serving as the founding director. In 2003 he was appointed to the James McGill Chair, and in 2005 he was rated by Maclean Magazine's Guide to Canadian Universities rated Paul as one of the "most popular Professors" at McGill University, and he became the recipient of the High Distinction in Research Award by McGill's Faculty of Arts in May 2005.

Paul was appointed as the editor of the Georgetown University Press book series: South Asia in World Affairs in 2010. He was the chair of International Studies Association's (ISA) International Security Section (ISSS) (2009–2011), and served as a Distinguished International Jury member of the Grawemeyer Award for Ideas Improving World Order, University of Louisville, in September 2012. He was also adjudged as Best Professor in International Relations Award, World Education Congress, Mumbai in June 2012 and was awarded KPS Menon Chair (Visiting) for Diplomatic Studies 2011–12, Mahatma Gandhi University, Kottayam, India.

He was a visiting scholar at Harvard University's Center for International Affairs (CFIA) and the Olin Institute for Strategic Studies (1997–98), and a visiting associate at the Center for Nonproliferation Studies, Monterey (2002–2003). He was a visiting professor of national security affairs at the Naval Postgraduate School (2002–03), Diplomatic Academy in Vienna (2014–present), Ritsumeikan University (2016), Ayoma Gakunin University (2017), and Nanyang Technological University (2017-2018).

He served as the president of the ISA from 2016 to 2017. During his time as the president, he led a task force on improving conditions of Global South scholars in international studies. He was instated as a Senior Fellow at the Royal Society of Canada in November 2018. At this time he published his monograph on soft balancing theory, and in 2019 he founded the Global Research Network on Peaceful Change (GRENPEC), a research network for scholars studying peaceful change in international politics. In 2025 he was the recipient of several awards recognizing his academic achievements, including the inaugural Kim Dae-jung Award from the International Political Science Association, and he was named a Distinguished Fellow of the Asia Pacific Foundation of Canada.

== Books ==
- The Unfinished Quest: India's Search for Major Power Status from Nehru to Modi (New York and Oxford: Oxford University Press, 2024) ISBN 978-0197669990
- Restraining Great Powers: Soft Balancing from Empires to the Global Era (New Haven: Yale University Press, 2018) ISBN 978-0300228489
- The Warrior State: Pakistan in the Contemporary World (Oxford University Press, 2013) ISBN 9780199322237
- Globalization and the National Security State with Norrin Ripsman (Oxford University Press, 2010) ISBN 978-0195393910
- The Tradition of Non-Use of Nuclear Weapons (Stanford University Press, 2009) ISBN 978-0-8047-6131-4
- India in the World Order: Searching for Major Power Status with B. Nayar (Cambridge University Press, 2002) ISBN 0-521-52875-5
- Power versus Prudence: Why Nations Forgo Nuclear Weapons (McGill-Queen's University Press, 2000) ISBN 0-7735-2087-2
- Asymmetric Conflicts: War Initiation by Weaker Powers (Cambridge University Press, 1994) ISBN 0-521-46621-0

Paul is the author or editor of over 24 books. He has also published nearly 85 journal articles and book chapters.

== Edited volumes ==
- The New Cold War and the Remaking of Regions (Co-editor Editor and Contributor with Markus Kornprobst) (Washington DC: Georgetown University Press, 2025) ISBN 9781647125875
- International Organizations and Peaceful Change in World Politics (Co-editor Editor and Contributor with Anders Wivel and Kai He) (Cambridge and New York: Cambridge University Press, 2025) ISBN 9781009509367
- Oxford Handbook on Peaceful Change in International Relations (Lead Editor and Contributor with Deborah Welch Larson, Harold Trinkunas, Anders Wivel &, Ralf Emmers) (New York: Oxford University Press, August, 2021) ISBN 9780190097363
- International Institutions and Power Politics (Editor and Contributor with Anders Wivel) (Washington DC: Georgetown University Press, September, 2019) ISBN 978-1626167018
- India-China Maritime Competition: The Security Dilemma at Sea (Editor and Contributor with Rajesh Basrur and Anit Mukherjee) (London: Routledge, 2019) ISBN 978-0367001544
- The China-India Rivalry in the Globalization Era (Editor and Contributor) Washington DC: Georgetown University Press, 2018 ISBN 978-1626165991
- Accommodating Rising Powers: Past, Present and Future (Editor & Contributor) (Cambridge University Press, 2016) ISBN 9781107592230
- Status in World Politics (co-editor and contributor with Deborah Larson and William Wohlforth) (Cambridge University Press, 2014) ISBN 9781107629295
- International Relations Theory and Regional Transformation (Cambridge University Press, 2012) ISBN 9781107604551
- South Asia’s Weak States: Understanding the Regional Insecurity Predicament (Editor & Contributor), Stanford: Stanford University Press (in hardcover and paperback editions), 2010 (South Asia Edition, Oxford University Press, New Delhi, 2011) ISBN 978-0804762212
- Complex Deterrence: Strategy In the Global Age (with Patrick M. Morgan and James J. Wirtz, University of Chicago Press, 2009) ISBN 978-0-226-65002-9
- The India-Pakistan Conflict: An Enduring Rivalry (Cambridge University Press, 2005) ISBN 978-0-521-67126-2
- Balance of Power: Theory and Practice in the 21st Century (with J. Wirtz and M. Fortman, Stanford University Press, 2004) ISBN 0-8047-5016-5
- The Nation-State in Question (with G. John Ikenberry and John A. Hall, Princeton University Press, 2003) ISBN 978-0-691-11509-2
- International Order and the Future of World Politics (with John A. Hall, Cambridge University Press, 1999) ISBN 978-0521658324
- The Absolute Weapon Revisited: Nuclear Arms and the Emerging International Order (with Richard Harknett and James Wirtz, The University of Michigan Press, 1998 & 2000) ISBN 978-0-472-08700-6

== Selected Essays ==
- "Soft Balancing in the Regions: Causes, Characteristics and Consequences," (with Kai He and

Anders Wivel)International Affairs, 101(1), Jan 2025, 3-15.

- "Globalization, De-globalization and Re-Globalization: Adapting Liberal International Order," International Affairs, 97(5), Fall 2021, pp. 1599–1620.
- "The Study of Peaceful Change in World Politics,” (co-author) in Paul et al eds. The Oxford Handbook of Peaceful Change in International Relations (New York: Oxford University Press, 2021), pp. 3–27.
- "When Balance of Power Meets Globalization: China, India and the Small States of South Asia," Politics, 39 (1) 2019, 50-63.
- “Assessing Change in World Politics,” International Studies Review, 20(2), June, 177-185
- "Disarmament Revisited: Is Nuclear Abolition Possible?" Journal of Strategic Studies, Vol. 35, No. 1, February 2012, pp. 149–169.
- "Taboo or Tradition: The Non-Use of “Nuclear Weapons in World Politics," Review of International Studies, 6, October 2010, pp. 853–863.
- "Why Has the India-Pakistan Rivalry Been So Enduring? Power Asymmetry and an Intractable Conflict,: Security Studies, 15(4) October–December 2006, 600–630.
- "Soft Balancing in the Age of US Primacy," International Security, 30(1) Summer 2005, pp. 46–71.
- "Nuclear Taboo and War Initiation: Nuclear Weapons in Regional Conflicts," Journal of Conflict Resolution, 39(4), December 1995, 696–717.
