= The Unfinished Quest =

2024 book by T.V. Paul

The Unfinished Quest: India's Search for Major Power Status from Nehru to Modi
- Author: T. V. Paul
- Language: English
- Publication date: 2024
- Pages: 288

The Unfinished Quest: India's Search for Major Power Status from Nehru to Modi is a book by T. V. Paul. It charts India's path toward a higher regional and global status.
