= War termination =

Study of how wars end

War termination is a sub-field of war studies which focuses on the study on "how wars end", including theories of how wars can and should be ended.

In comparison to other aspects of war, war termination has received relatively less study. According to Fred Charles Iklé, "[H]istorians, foreign affairs experts, and military strategists have devoted far more thought to the question of how and why wars begin." This idea is echoed by Gideon Rose, who writes:

For all endgames' drama and historical importance, however, they have received far less attention than other phases of war. A few books look at the ends of individual wars, and there is a small academic literature on what political scientists call war termination. But in general, endgames have been as neglected by scholars as they have been by policymakers.

In studying the factors which constrain and shape the actions of decision-makers and strategists in ending wars, there are three major schools of thought:

1. Realism, which considers that a nation's foreign policy is primarily concerned with security issues, and sees international power politics as the most important factor;
2. Liberalism, which proposes that internal factors, such as political ideology and domestic politics, are the primary factors;
3. Those who consider psychological factors, such as the personalities of a country's leaders, and the society's experiences in the most recent war, as most instrumental in shaping those leaders' actions in the endgame.

Other theories, such as neoclassical realism, combine these factors to one extent or another.

== Theories of war termination ==
War termination is coercive bargaining and it only comes to an end when two interacting sides can agree upon their relative strength and credibly commit to a settlement (Goemans, 2000; Stanley and Sawyer, 2009). According to Goemans (2000) and Slantchev's Principle of Convergence, in order for that to happen, both players must have enough information about the other's strengths and about what they are willing to concede. Once expectations about the outcomes of war converge sufficiently, a bargaining space is created so that a negotiated settlement can be reached.

The battlefield is one of the main sources of information about the enemy, say Goemans and Slantchev. It is in warfare that one discovers how far belligerents are willing to go and what chances one has against the other. Players will delay agreement until they have enough information about their prospects. Once they learn enough about the other, continuing warfare would impose costs that both would prefer to avoid and thus a bargaining range is created.

According to Slantchev, another important way of gathering information about the opponent is the way he behaves on the negotiation table. "Since readiness to talk can be so revealing, it may provide a good rationale for delaying explicit diplomacy until after an armistice. (…) For example, making an unreasonable demand signals strength but defeat in battle reveals weakness."

Provided with the new information acquired from the battlefield and from the negotiation table, players are then capable of adjusting their expectations about the outcomes of war. Once they are convergent enough, a bargaining space is created and conflict can come to an end through a settlement that avoids the costs of war.

The adjustment of expectations, however, can also come from a change in the foreign policy leadership itself, or as Stanley and Sawyer (2009) would say, from domestic coalition shifts. A "domestic governing coalition" is "the elite foreign policy decision-making group in each belligerent government," that is, the actors who have the power to decide whether a country engages in war or if it ends it. A "domestic coalition shift," as the authors define it, is either "(1) a consequential change in the identity of the decision makers or (2) a substantive change in the type of government." In other words, domestic aspects of the players, such as their type of regime and their leaders' characteristics, can affect war termination.

Having the domestic coalition in mind, according to the Equifinality of War theory, there can be three kinds of obstacles to peace. The first one is a matter of preference: if decision makers do not want to stop the war, be it for personal stakes, reputation, or security (when the costs of not engaging are higher than going to war, for instance), there is no place for negotiation.

The second obstacle has to do with information: if leaders receive poor quality information or if there is a problem in the way this information is interpreted, they are not aware of the fact that they should end the war. And finally, there is the risk of entrapment, which can be defined as decision makers wanting to end the war, having all the information needed to do so, but not being able to do it, due to "internal or external hawkish constituencies." The more entrenched war becomes, the harder it is to end it.

If war termination demands that at least one side changes its expectations about the outcomes of war, then a domestic coalition shift may accelerate this process and overcome the obstacles to peace, say Stanley and Sawyer. "The coalition shift allows different political actors — with different interests, assessments of the war, and constituencies — to take power."

The Principle of Convergence, the Equifinality of War and every other theory of war termination make one assumption: that at some point, a negotiation with the enemy is going to be possible, acceptable and, in the end, desirable. Regardless of the information gathered in warfare, there is eventually going to be room for diplomacy. Negotiation is paramount for the achievement of peace as defined by Clausewitz: the acceptance by the belligerents that the war results are final, not something that can be changed by violence when more favourable circumstances appear.

== See also ==
- Debellatio
- Grand strategy
- Jus post bellum
- Suing for peace
