= Andrew Price-Smith =

Dr. Andrew Price-Smith (1968–2019) was a political scientist and academic writer best known for his work on 'health security' and 'environmental security.' An expert on the effects of Influenza pandemics and government efforts to contain them, his consilient works analyzed the complex linkages among environmental change, infectious disease, history, economics and security. He held appointments at Columbia University, the University of South Florida, and Colorado College, where he served the chair of the Political Science Department from 2013 to 2016.

Price-Smith was the first to empirically model an index for State Capacity variables. Although Price-Smith's findings were often espoused by the Human Security community, his work suggested that he was a National Security (IR) theoretician who invokes elements of republicanism (see Daniel Deudney), coupled with facets of political psychology (see Robert Jervis).

== Influences ==
Price-Smith's intellectual influences included Francis Bacon, Jean-Jacques Rousseau, Hans Morgenthau, William McNeill, Alfred Crosby, E.O. Wilson, and Robert Fogel.

== Academic background ==
Price-Smith earned a BA (Honours) in Political Science from Queen's University in Kingston, Ontario in 1992. His Master's in Political Science from the University of Western Ontario in 1994 focused upon Operation Desert Shield/Desert Storm (1990–1991), and the conflict between the US-led coalition forces and Iraq. He completed his PhD in Political Science at the University of Toronto in 1999. His doctoral dissertation was entitled The Health of Nations and formed the core of his subsequent book of the same name, published by MIT, and shortlisted for the Grawemeyer Award in 2002.

At the University of Toronto, Price-Smith initially studied under Thomas Homer-Dixon, but finished his doctorate under David A. Welch. He completed the dissertation that was published by MIT as The Health of Nations. Upon graduation Price-Smith accepted a post-doctoral position at the Earth Institute of Columbia University, and concurrently taught at Columbia's School of International and Public Affairs (SIPA). Following that, he taught at the University of South Florida for several years, where he began to develop his interests in the nexus of energy/environment and health. He moved to Colorado College in the summer of 2005 to take a position in the Department of Political Science.

== Teaching career ==
During his tenure at Colorado College, Price-Smith was named the Packard Professor of Political Science from 2018–2019 and Director of the college's Global Health Initiative. He was the Chair of the Political Science Department from 2013–2016 and also served as Chair of the Environmental Science Program from 2009–2010.

== Death ==
Price-Smith died of cancer on July 11, 2019.

== Books ==
- Oil, Illiberalism and War: Analysis of Energy and US Foreign Policy, MIT Press, 2015, ISBN 978-0-262-02906-3
- Rising Threats, Enduring Challenges, Readings in US Foreign Policy, Oxford University Press, 2015, ISBN 978-0-19-989763-6
- Contagion and Chaos: Disease, Ecology, and National Security in the Era of Globalization, MIT Press, 2009 ISBN 978-0-262-16248-7
- The Health of Nations: Infectious Disease, Environmental Change, and Their Effects on National Security and Development. MIT Press. 2002. ISBN 0-262-16203-2.
- Plagues and Politics : Infectious Disease and International Policy. Palgrave/Macmillan Press. 2001. ISBN 0-333-80066-4.
- Downward Spiral: HIV/AIDS, State Capacity and Political Violence in Zimbabwe. US Institute of Peace Press. 2004.

Price-Smith's book, Contagion and Chaos, won a Choice Magazine Award for Best Academic Book of 2009, and Health of Nations was short listed for the Grawemeyer Award in 2002. Price-Smith's work has been cited in the Atlantic Monthly, Globe and Mail, Toronto Star, and the Denver Post. He lectured at the University of Oxford, Columbia University, Dartmouth College, UCLA, and in Canada, UK, France, Norway, and Switzerland, and spoken on Voice of America.

Price-Smith was an influential voice in Washington policy circles. His address to the House Science and Technology Committee was detailed in a front-page article of the Washington Post, entitled: "Mr. Smith Goes to Washington." Price-Smith occasionally acted as consultant for the United Nations Development Program, the World Bank, the United States Institute of Peace, the US Department of Energy, and the US Department of Homeland Security (among other institutions).

== See also ==
- Environmental Sustainability Index
