= Asle Toje =

Norwegian foreign policy scholar (born 1974)

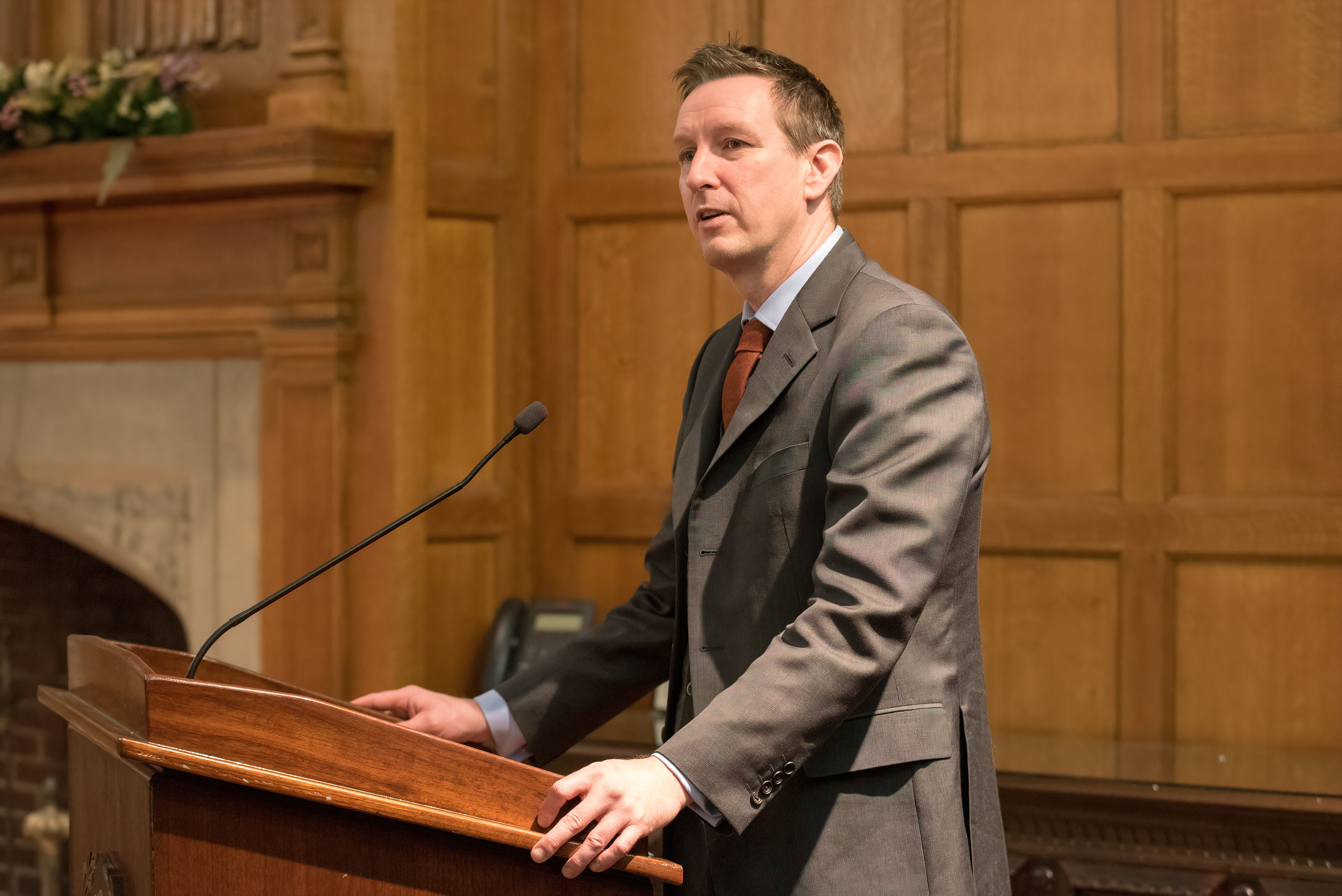
- Asle Toje Lecturing at the Sorbonne, Paris
- Born: February 16, 1974 (age 52)

Education
- Education: Pembroke College, Cambridge

Philosophical work
- School: Neoclassical realism
- Institutions: Norwegian Nobel Committee
- Main interests: International relations theory
- Website: Official website

Asle Toje (born February 16, 1974) is the Deputy Leader of the Norwegian Nobel Committee (2018-2029). He is a foreign policy scholar and was Research Director at the Norwegian Nobel Institute from 2009 until he joined the Nobel Peace Prize Committee. Toje is a regular contributor to the Norwegian foreign policy debate, including as a regular columnist in the Dagens Næringsliv, Minerva. In the Norwegian foreign policy discourse he has been a proponent of democracy, market economy, the rule of law, and conservatism. Toje has in recent years spent most of his time on issues at the intersection of nuclear disarmament, peace and geopolitics.

== Academic career ==
Asle Toje was educated at universities in Oslo and Tromsø before going on to study international relations (Dr. Phil.) at Pembroke College, Cambridge, where he graduated in 2006. In 2010, he published the book The European Union as a Small Power: After the Post-Cold War.

== Bibliography ==
- Gullbrikkespillet: Et Europa i ruiner (Oslo, Dreyer, 2020)
- The Causes of Peace: What We Know Now (Ed. w. Bård Nicholas Vik Steen, Houston, Nobel Press, 2019)
- Will China's Rise Be Peaceful?: Security, Stability, and Legitimacy (Ed., Oxford University Press, Ed. 2018)
- Jernburet – Liberalismens krise (Oslo, Dreyer Forlag, 2014)
- Rødt, Hvitt & Blått – Om demokratiet i Europa (Oslo, Dreyer Forlag, 2012)
- Neoclassical Realism in European Politics Ed. w, B.Kunz (Manchester, Manchester University Press, 2012)
- The European Union as a small power - after the post Cold War (London, Palgrave / Macmillan, 2010)
- America, the EU and Strategic Culture: Renegotiating the Transatlantic Bargain (London, Routledge, 2008)
