= Jeffrey W. Taliaferro =

Political professor and researcher

Education
- Education: Duke University (AB); Harvard University (PhD)

Philosophical work
- Era: 21st century
- Region: North America
- School: Neoclassical realism
- Institutions: Tufts University
- Main interests: national security; international security; international relations theory; foreign policy analysis
- Notable works: Neoclassical Realism, the State, and Foreign Policy (2009); Neoclassical Realist Theory of International Politics (2016); Defending Frenemies: Alliance Politics and Nuclear Nonproliferation in US Foreign Policy (2019)
- Notable ideas: resource extraction, loss aversion, and balance-of-risk

Jeffrey W. Taliaferro is an American political scientist and international relations scholar. He is a professor of political science at Tufts University. His teaching and research focus on security studies and international relations theory.

== Biography ==
He received his A.B. from Duke University in political science and history and his A.M. and Ph.D. in government from Harvard University. Taliaferro was an assistant professor at Tufts University from 1998 to 2005, associate professor at Tufts from 2005 to 2020, and is currently professor in the Department of Political Science in the School of Arts and Sciences at Tufts. He also lectures at the Fletcher School.

Taliaferro is on the editorial board for International Security and Security Studies. He previously served on the editorial board for the Review of International Studies (2010-2016), a journal of the British International Studies Association, and for the International Studies Review (2007-2011 and 2015–2021), a journal of the International Studies Association. Taliaferro has held fellowships at the Wilson Center and the Norwegian Nobel Institute.

Taliaferro co-edited/co-authored Neoclassical Realism, the State, and Foreign Policy (2009) and Neoclassical Realist Theory of International Politics (2016), which develop neoclassical realist theory in international relations, with Norrin M. Ripsman and Steven E. Lobell. Taliaferro's most recent solo-authored book Defending Frenemies: Alliance Politics and Nuclear Nonproliferation in US Foreign Policy (2019) extends neoclassical realist theory to the study of coercive diplomacy between allies and nuclear nonproliferation.

== Selected publications ==
=== Books ===
- Defending Frenemies: Alliance Politics and Nuclear Nonproliferation in US Foreign Policy (New York: Oxford University Press, 2019), simultaneous cloth, paperback, and Oxford Scholarship Online editions, 288 pages.|
- Neoclassical Realist Theory of International Politics (New York: Oxford University Press, 2016) co-authored with Norrin M. Ripsman and Steven E. Lobell; simultaneous cloth and paperback editions, April 2016, 208 pages; Chinese (Mandarin) translation released by Shanghai People's Publishing House, October 2017.
- The Challenge of Grand Strategy: The Great Powers and Broken Balance between the World Wars (Cambridge: Cambridge University 2012), co-editor and contributor with Norrin M. Ripsman and Steven E. Lobell; cloth edition August 2012; paperback edition August 2013, 310 pages.
- Neoclassical Realism, the State, and Foreign Policy (Cambridge: Cambridge University Press, 2009), co-editor and contributor with Steven E. Lobell and Norrin M. Ripsman; simultaneous paperback and cloth editions, 275 pages.
- Balancing Risks: Great Power Intervention in the Periphery, Cornell Studies in Security Affairs (Ithaca: Cornell University Press, 2004), cloth, 320 pages. Winner of the 2005 Robert Jervis-Paul W. Schroeder Prize for the Best Book in International History and Politics, American Political Science Association.
