= Balance of terror =

Cold War policy of tenuous peace

The phrase "balance of terror" is usually, but not invariably, used in reference to the nuclear arms race between the United States and the Soviet Union during the Cold War.

== During the Cold War ==
It describes the tenuous peace that existed between the two countries as a result of both governments being terrified at the prospect of a world-destroying nuclear war. The term is usually used for rhetorical purposes, and was probably coined by Lester Pearson in June 1955 at the 10th anniversary of the signing of the UN Charter: "the balance of terror has succeeded the balance of power".

Some political scientists use this phrase as a means of differentiating the world situation that followed World War II from that which preceded it. Previously, empires had prevented war between each other by maintaining a relative balance of their ability (economic, military, and political) to wage war against each other—the phrase "balance of power" was often used to describe this kind of tentative peace.

The atomic bomb created a new political reality, in which two superpowers had the ability to destroy each other and at least gravely damage all of human civilization. The obstacle to war between the communists and capitalists was no longer the fear that the other side was more powerful, but rather the realization that nuclear arsenals were now large enough and deadly enough that winning would still likely result in the destruction of one's own country and perhaps the rest of the world as well.

One could argue that in a counterintuitive way, the existence of the most powerful weapons ever created actually supported a kind of peace: while many wars were fought around the world during the Cold War, the superpowers never fought each other directly, nor have atomic bombs been dropped in war since the atomic bombing of Nagasaki in 1945. On the other hand, the existence of nuclear weapons did not deter the superpowers from engaging in conventional warfare, such as in the Korean War, Vietnam War, and the Soviet–Afghan War.

== Other uses ==
Lawrence Summers, after the 2008 financial crisis, adopted the term as appropriate for the situation of a 'financial balance of terror' in global markets.

== Uses ==
- John F. Kennedy used the phrase in his 1961 inaugural address in which he described the United States and the Soviet Union were "both racing to alter that uncertain balance of terror that stays the hand of mankind's final war."
- Albert Wohlstetter of the RAND Corporation wrote the paper "The Delicate Balance of Terror" in 1958.
- The Star Trek episode "Balance of Terror" borrowed the catch phrase for the title. The story had Captain Kirk matching wits with a Romulan commander whose ship had superior weaponry and was capable of invisibility. Kirk had to find a way to stop the Romulan attacks without starting a war.

== See also ==
- Balance of power
- Balance of threat
- Deterrence theory
- Long Peace
- Mutual assured destruction
- Nuclear peace
- Peace through strength
- Reagan Doctrine
