= Anarchy Is What States Make of It =

1992 article by Alexander Wendt

"Anarchy Is What States Make of It: The Social Construction of Power Politics" is a journal article by Alexander Wendt published in International Organization in 1992 that outlines a constructivist approach to international relations theory.

Wendt argues that anarchy is not inherent in the international system in the way in which other schools of international relations theory envision it, but rather it is a construct of the nation-states in the system. At the core of constructivist thought is the idea that many core aspects of international relations are socially constructed (they are given their form by ongoing processes of social practice and interaction), rather than inherent, contrary to the assumptions of neorealism and neoliberalism. According to Wendt, the two basic tenets of constructivism are:

- The structures of human association are determined primarily by shared ideas rather than material forces.
- The identities and interests of purposive actors are constructed by these shared ideas rather than given by nature.

The constructivist sentiment is summed up in the following extract from the article: "I argue that self-help and power politics do not follow either logically or causally from anarchy and that if today we find ourselves in a self-help world, this is due to process, not structure. There is no 'logic' of anarchy apart from the practices that create and instantiate one structure of identities and interests rather than another; structure has no existence or causal powers apart from process. Self-help and power politics are institutions, not essential features, of anarchy. Anarchy is what states make of it".

== See also ==
- Power politics
- Social Theory of International Politics
