= Border Pacific Railroad =

Short line railroad

The Border Pacific Railroad (reporting mark BOP) is a short-line railroad headquartered in Rio Grande City, Texas, United States.

BOP operates a 31.6 miles (50.9 km) line from Rio Grande City to an interchange with Union Pacific (via Rio Valley Switching Company) at Mission, Texas. BOP traffic includes silica sand, ballast, crushed stone, asphalt, scrap paper, and feed grains.

The line was opened in 1925 and became part of Missouri Pacific in 1956. Short-line service started in 1984. The BOP went idle for a while in 2013 after a bridge fire but once the bridge was repaired it has been running ever since.
