= Balancing (international relations) =

Aspect of balance of power theory

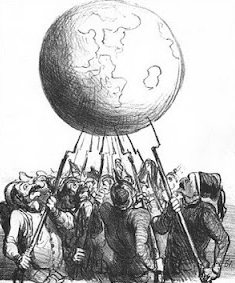
Honore Daumier, L'Equilibre European, (1866)

In international relations, the concept of balancing derives from the balance of power theory, the most influential theory from the realist school of thought, which assumes that a formation of hegemony in a multistate system is unattainable since hegemony is perceived as a threat by other states, causing them to engage in balancing against a potential hegemon.

Balancing encompasses the actions that a particular state or group of states take in order to equalise the odds against more powerful states; that is to make it more difficult and hence less likely for powerful states to exert their military advantage over the weaker ones.

According to the balance of power theory, states, motivated primarily by their desire for survival and security, will develop and implement military capabilities and hard power mechanisms in order to constrain the most powerful and rising state that can prove a potential threat. This idea illustrates the concept of internal balancing, which is opposed to external, under which states come together and form an alliance to balance and gain more leverage over a dominant or rising power. In recent years, soft-balancing has emerged as a new concept of illustrating how states balance powerful actors, which advocates the use of economic and diplomatic tools to constrain the most powerful state and inhibit their exertion of power and dominance.

== Theoretical origins ==
Balancing behaviour of states is prompted by the structural characteristics of the balance of power system itself. This belief is strongly perpetrated by theorists of neorealism or structural realism, namely Kenneth Waltz who is one of the earliest and most significant contributors to neorealism and balance of power theory.

Neorealist theory makes a few assumptions about the system, the interests and motives of the actors within it and the constraints that all states face, which ultimately lead to behaviours such as balancing.

The first assumption is that the international order is anarchic, which is a primary cause of the balancing behaviour of states. Anarchy, or the lack of an overarching law enforcing body, inevitably forces states to rely on their individual resources and actions to assure their welfare, whereby it becomes a responsibility and a requirement of each state to look out for its own survival and security and show readiness in countering force and aggression from other actors.

The second assumption is that the primary goal of all actors is their own survival. At a minimum, they simply strive for their own preservation, while others may have more expansionist motives and seek universal domination. Balancing, hence, becomes a tool by which states use the means available to them to achieve their goals and interests; that is to protect themselves from a more threatening actor or to further their power and capability. This leads to the notion of self-help which is labelled the principal action of all actors under the anarchic order. States must rely on their own means and arrangements in order to assure their security - that is act in their own self-interest in order to avoid falling victim to a more powerful state. This inevitably leads states to behave in ways prescribed by the balance of power.

The third assumption is the relative nature of power. The key to security and survival of each state is power, not as an absolute concept, but rather in relations to that of other states, and balancing can often be used as a mechanism of gaining a greater share of power or decreasing the share of power possessed by another state.

== Traditional forms ==
Balancing can be carried out through internal or external efforts and means. Internal balancing involves efforts to enhance state's power by increasing one's economic resources and military strength in order to be able to rely on independent capabilities in response to a potential hegemon and be able to compete more effectively in the international system. In a self-help, anarchic system, mechanisms of internal balancing are believed to be more reliable and precise than external balancing since they rest on independent strategies and actions.

External balancing involves strengthening and enlarging one's alliances and interstate cooperation in order to prevent a hegemon or counter a rising power. In face of a common threat and a single dominant state with a potential to jeopardise collective security and survival, states are expected to put aside their secondary disputes and join a balancing alliance. External balancing represents an alliance arrangement whereby states join in opposition to a stronger state that is perceived as a source of danger, making this kind of balancing a measure of assuring security through combined opposition to an aggressor or a potential hegemon who can endanger the wellbeing and survival of smaller powers.

In the balance of power system, balancing is opposed to the concept of bandwagoning, whereby smaller states seek to achieve their security by allying with the major power or a dominant actor. As tempting as this option may be for smaller powers, it can essentially undermine the security of the international system because by joining an alliance with a rising, potentially expansionist state, aggression and expansionist motives are being rewarded and accepted. It is in the interest of states to form coalitions with others with similar or lesser power in order to build their defensive and deterrent capabilities and through this discourage and prevent a growing power from becoming too strong and dominant. After all, as Waltz summed it up, "states... flock to the weaker side, for it is the stronger side that threatens them".

== Why states balance ==
States balance in order to avoid being dominated by stronger powers. It is in the interest of states to curb a potential hegemon before it becomes too powerful so that they avoid falling victim to its rule once it achieves a dominant power status. It becomes a safer alternative to either improve one's own capabilities through self-help mechanisms or join alliances with states who cannot readily dominate in order to restrain and curb the one who can potentially dominate the system and undermine the survival of actors within it.

Another reason why states in a majority of instances choose to balance and not bandwagon is because joining the balancing alliance allows them to have more influence and play a more important role in that alliance, whereas the alliance with a major power would not allow them opportunities for a great deal of contribution and decisive capability as they would inevitably be dominated by their powerful ally. States prefer to preserve their freedom of action in an alliance rather than have orders imposed on them by aligning with a potential hegemon. If states are extremely vulnerable and insignificant, bandwagoning may be their only choice, however middle powers and states that have something to contribute and protect will always balance in face of a rising power and a potential hegemon

There are a number of factors that influence the decision of states to balance or bandwagon, as proposed by Stephen Walt in his account on alliance formation. First is aggregate power, which constitutes state's resources and capabilities. This particular factor can provoke balancing, in that a state with high aggregate power is a potential threat and can evoke fears of domination in smaller powers, but it can just as easily lead to bandwagoning as smaller states might be attracted to power and protection from a strong ally. The second factor is proximate power, whereby geographically close states pose a greater threat than distant ones as the ability to project power declines with distance. Once again, an aggressive and increasingly powerful neighbouring state is likely to alarm other states to engage in balancing strategies against it, however small, weak and vulnerable states neighbouring a great power are often prone to balancing due to the lack of viable alternatives, inability to balance independently or contribute to a balancing alliance. Offensive power is the third factor, which conveys that states with large and growing offensive capabilities are likely to provoke other to balance against them. The fourth factor concerns offensive intentions, where perceived aggressive or expansionist goals or motives of a state lead others to balance against it.

Traditionally, balancing prevailed in understanding the behaviour of states in face of hegemony, as well as in understanding how alliances come together. However, it is tough to dispute the growing trend towards bandwagoning rather than balancing exhibited over the recent decades of United States (U.S.) prevalence. This trend has shown that, whether for purposes of seeking protection or out of fear, states are choosing to ally with the superpower and accept the conditions its inflicts onto the international system.

== Failures and criticisms ==
Both internal and external forms of balancing encounter a fair share of obstacles, problems and criticisms. Internal balancing is subjected to a number of domestic obstacles that can impede its success. High costs associated with it and the difficult task of allocating resources to be able to make significant contributions to one's economic and military development are among the main ones. Furthermore, independently balancing a major power would require major expansion of one's capabilities and accelerated rearmament, which would undoubtedly provoke unfavourable responses from not just the major power in question but also other states. A state that adopts a strategy of military buildup to increase its security and balance a rising power may inadvertently do the very opposite and create unfavourable conditions for all in the international system. It can inevitably cause a security dilemma, whereby the increase in power and security of one state decreases that of another and offsets offensive actions, potential arms races and escalating hostility among actors, hindering collective security.

External balancing, even though it is a more commonly practiced form of balancing, encounters a variety of obstacles and criticisms. Its success is contingent on an enduring and coherent alliance system, however given the structural constraints of the international system, this might be difficult to attain and ensure. The anarchic nature of the international system together with the states' primary goal of survival intrinsically causes a self-help approach from all states, whereby reliance and trust on other actors are significantly undermined. Alliances do, however, form despite these structural impediments, but they are seen as temporary arrangements that should not be overly relied upon.

The international system is subjected to the enduring conditions of insecurity and uncertainty about the intentions and actions of actors within it which makes cooperation difficult to achieve and maintain. Furthermore, external balancing is caught in the problematique of the 'game of coordination' and a collective action problem in which it is difficult to sustain long term cooperation, dedications and equal contributions to the cause. There are powerful incentives to free-ride on the efforts of others and in this way avoid costs and risks while enjoying the alliance benefits.

Since individual actors in the alliance have the same interest and goal in mind, to balance the major, rising power, it should logically follow that everyone in that alliance will act on behalf of the common interest and objective. However, even though there is an expectation to share the costs and efforts of achieving a common goal, alliances and groups demonstrate a tendency towards exploitation and inconsistent dedication and input among participants. Mancur Olson, one of the leading theorists on collective action identified that despite all the members sharing a common interest, groups (or alliances for this purpose) lack a common interest in paying the costs of achieving a collective benefit, making it problematic to achieve the ends and difficult to maintain the alliance.

However, the main critique surrounding balance of power theory and subsequently balancing behaviour of states highlights that this logic applies to and concerns the period of the rise of hegemon: states will come together and balance a rising power that has potential or demonstrates ambitions towards becoming a hegemon, while saying very little and making no predictions about the occurrences once hegemony is already established.

As such, this theory and predicament of state behaviour falls short of explaining occurrences on today's world frontier. At present, the US enjoys a well established primacy, with power and capabilities greatly superior than that of other states. At no other period in history was the margin of dominance of one state over others so extensive, making the traditional application of balance of power theory and predictions of balancing behaviour from secondary powers inapplicable.

== Today: soft-balancing argument ==
Kenneth Waltz proposed that unipolarity is the most unstable and the "least durable of all international configurations", since even if the dominant power acts benevolently, secondary powers will need to remain cautious about its future intentions and actions in the absence of checks and balances and an equal power to balance and restrain it. Historical instances of great unbalanced power, such as Louis XIV and Napoleon I's rule of France or Adolf Hitler's rule of Germany, saw aggressive and expansionist motives with aims to conquer and dominate, hence provoking the crucial need for balancing in an instance of a single dominant state in order to bring the international distribution of power into balance.

In today's unipolar world, given the problems and difficulties associated with both internal and external forms of hard balancing, soft balancing has surfaced as a more favourable option for secondary powers to, through non-military tools, attempt to "delay, frustrate and undermine" actions, strategies and unilateral decisions of the unipolar leader, the United States. Advocates of soft balancing have proposed a number of mechanisms through which states engage in this form of balancing, including diplomacy, diplomatic coalitions, international institutions and agreements, statecraft mechanisms such as territorial denial, as well as economic initiatives and multilateral and regional economic endeavours that exclude the superpower in the process.

The U.S. pre-eminence has not been balanced against over the last decades mainly because the superpower exhibited non-aggressive approaches without seeking to dominate or challenge the sovereign existence of others but rather promote security and autonomy of all. However, it is argued that increasing U.S. unilateralism, especially under the Bush administration, has changed its image of a benign superpower and made foreign governments uneasy regarding its ambitions. A number of aggressive and unilateral foreign policies, most significant ones being the abandonment of Kyoto Protocol, withdrawal from the Anti-Ballistic Missile Treaty and most importantly the decision to go to war in Iraq in 2003 despite great opposition from other states have led secondary powers to pursue indirect, soft-balancing strategies towards constraining the U.S. power and preventing it from becoming an "unrestricted global hegemon".

The Iraq invasion is often used as one of the key incidents that provoked major states to rethink their own security and resort to soft balancing against the unipole since it proved not simply a strategy aimed at stopping proliferation of nuclear weapons by rogue states but rather a challenge to the norm of territorial integrity – an aggressive U.S. intervention into a region outside of its own that demonstrated the U.S. commitment to taking any necessary actions to ensure that their superiority and primacy is not challenged by anyone.

== Future ==
The notion of soft-balancing, while relatively new and not universally accepted, is shaping up to be the way in which states will engage in balancing in the future. Even though it is unlikely to bring any substantial changes to the balance of power within the international realm, it does show potential in constraining the major power and allowing secondary powers to have their input in international affairs and maintain their autonomy under the dominance of a unipolar leader.

However, this is not to say that traditional, hard balancing is a thing of the past. Indeed, some powerful arguments are emerging both from the political and academic realms pointing to the rapid emergence of rising powers, namely China and India, as balancers and competitors of the U.S. in a bid for power, dominance and ultimately hegemony. For robust critics on soft balancing and unipolar stability, see Dall'Agnol. The author's main argument is that balance of power, as proposed by Waltz, still applies to the post-Cold War era.

China is undoubtedly surfacing as the most credible power, one with the greatest potential over the next decade or two to alter the balance of power away from U.S. primacy. China has come through as a "formidable political, strategic and economic competitor" to the United States, increasingly challenging its regional and global leadership. Despite claims of peaceful rise mainly focused on economic prosperity, the world is becoming increasingly aware and anxious of China's military expansion and modernisation, with its military budget rising 17.5 percent in 2008 and 18.5 percent in 2009 over the previous year. Seeing how China's economic and military growth corresponds to the logic of internal balancing, it comes as no surprise that its claim of "peaceful growth" is increasingly being suspected of implying a challenge to the current world order and balance of power. In addition, soft-balancing mechanisms can also be detected, as the growth in regional partnerships and agreements has offset a new regional integration with China at its centre where the U.S. is excluded from participation, the most significant example being the ASEAN–China Free Trade Area established since January 2010. The emergence of new major powers is certain to bring changes to the balance of power dynamics regardless of the level and intensity at which these powers choose to balance the unipolar leader. Even if China and other growing states refrain from balancing the U.S., the sheer size of their economy, capability and military strength will undoubtedly pose certain constraints on the U.S. freedom of strategic action, ability to influence, dominate and project power in the future.
