= Balance of Power (board game) =

Board game

Balance of Power is a board game published by Hasbro in 1979.

== Gameplay ==
Balance of Power is a political abstract strategy game.

== Reviews ==
- Games #16
- Jeux & Stratégie #6 (as "Le Cinq Neuf")
