= Daniel Deudney =

American political scientist

Daniel Horace Deudney
- Born: March 9, 1953 (age 73)
- Known for: Republican security theory Bounding Power; Dark Skies; Geopolitics and republicanism
- Awards: Johns Hopkins University Alumni Association Excellence in Teaching Award (2005); Robert Jervis and Paul Schroeder Award (2008); ISA Book of the Decade Award (2010); George E. Owens Teaching Award (2001); Lindback Award (1996)

Academic background
- Education: Yale University (BA, 1975); George Washington University (MPA); Princeton University (MA, PhD, 1989)
- Thesis: (1989)

Academic work
- Institutions: Johns Hopkins University; University of Pennsylvania (1991–1998); Worldwatch Institute (1980s)

Daniel Horace Deudney (born March 9, 1953) is an American political scientist and Professor of Political Science at Johns Hopkins University. His published work is mainly in the fields of international relations and political theory, with an emphasis on geopolitics and republicanism.

== Education ==
Deudney graduated from Yale University in 1975 with a Bachelor of Arts in political science and philosophy. He holds an MPA in science, technology, and public policy from the George Washington University. In 1989, he graduated from Princeton University with an MA and PhD in political science.

== Career ==
In the late 1970s, Deudney worked for three years as the senior legislative assistant for energy and environment and legislative director to Senator John A. Durkin (D-NH). In the 1980s, he was a senior researcher at the Worldwatch Institute in Washington D.C. He also consulted for the Departments of State and Defense and the Central Intelligence Agency.

From 1991 to 1998, Deudney taught at the University of Pennsylvania, as an assistant professor before he accepted a position as associate professor at Johns Hopkins University.

He has won several awards for teaching including the Johns Hopkins University Alumni Association Excellence in Teaching Award in 2005, the George E. Owens Teaching Award in 2001, and Penn's Lindback Award for excellence in teaching in 1996.

Deudney's book, Bounding Power: Republican Security Theory from the Polis to the Global Village, is revolutionary in its field, as he seeks to carry out a profound critique of realism and liberalism. He argues that realism and liberalism are both fragments of a broader tradition of republican thought. In contrast to either realism or liberalism, republican political thought is focused on negotiating the space between anarchy and hierarchy, and he has coined the term "negarchy." The book was reviewed in March/April 2007 issue of Foreign Affairs. It received the 2008 Robert Jervis and Paul Schroeder Award for the Best Book on International History and Politics, International History and Politics Section, American Political Science Association, and the 2010 ISA Book of the Decade Award in International Studies, International Studies Association.Bounding Power

Overall, Deudney remains a liberal theorist, describing liberalism as "not the enemy of republican security theory, but its privileged... child". He believes the liberal democratic model will prevail in the world, and without believing in the triumphalism of Francis Fukuyama's thesis, he paraphrases him: "Liberal states should not assume that history has ended, but they can still be certain that it is on their side."

== Works ==
=== Books ===
- Deudney, Daniel (2020). Dark skies: space expansionism, planetary geopolitics, and the ends of humanity. Oxford, UK: Oxford University Press. ISBN 978-0-1909-0334-3.
- Deudney, Daniel (2007). Bounding power : republican security theory from the polis to the global village. Princeton: Princeton University Press. ISBN 978-0-691-11901-4.
- Deudney, Daniel; Richard A. Matthew (1999). Contested grounds: security and conflict in the new environmental politics. Albany, NY: State University of New York Press. ISBN 0-7914-4115-6.
- Deudney, Daniel (1983). Whole earth security : a geopolitics of peace. Washington, D.C.: Worldwatch Institute. ISBN 0-916468-54-2.
- Deudney, Daniel; Christopher Flavin (1983). Renewable energy : the power to choose. New York: W. W. Norton. ISBN 0-393-01710-9.
- Deudney, Daniel (1982). Space, the high frontier in perspective. Washington, D.C.: Worldwatch Institute. ISBN 0-916468-49-6.
- Deudney, Daniel (1981). Rivers of energy, the hydropower potential. Washington, D.C.: Worldwatch Institute. ISBN 0-916468-43-7.

=== Dissertation ===
- Deudney, Daniel (1989). Global geopolitics : a reconstruction, interpretation, and evaluation of materialist world order theories of the late nineteenth and early twentieth centuries (Ph.D. thesis). Princeton University. OCLC 22316596.

=== Articles ===
- Deudney, Daniel. "Publius before Kant: Federal-Republican Security and Democratic Peace." European Journal of International Relations. London: Sep 2004. Vol.10, Iss. 3; p. 315

== See also ==
=== Relevant concepts ===
- Negarchy
- Geopolitics

=== Other republican IR theorists ===
- Nicholas Onuf
- Andrew Price-Smith
- Steven Slaughter
