= Balance of Power (Ab Hugh novel) =

1994 novel by Dafydd ab Hugh

- Author: Dafydd Ab Hugh
- Series: Star Trek: The Next Generation
- Genre: Science fiction
- Publication date: 1995

Balance of Power is a Star Trek: The Next Generation novel by Dafydd Ab Hugh.

== Plot summary ==
When a famous Federation scientist dies, his son puts his inventions up for sale to the highest bidder—whether Federation, Klingon, Romulan or Cardassian. Among the items at auction are medical devices, engineering advances—and a photon pulse cannon capable of punching through a starship's shields with a single shot.

Meanwhile, at the Academy, Wesley Crusher comes to the aid of his best friend—and finds himself kidnapped by outlaw Ferengi bent on controlling the universe through commerce. When they also set their sights on the photon cannon, Captain Picard must find a way to save the Starship Enterprise and the Federation from the deadliest weapon ever known—with every race in the galaxy aligned against him.

== Production ==
Following Dafydd Ab Hugh's first Star Trek novel, Fallen Heroes, he discovered that he earned more money from writing these types of books than those outside of the franchise. This and the introduction of the gold pressed latinum as a currency in Star Trek: The Next Generation and Star Trek: Deep Space Nine influenced him to write a novel about this subject matter. He stated that since latinum could not be replicated in-universe, it seemed natural to have a plot where someone discovered how to. He believed that such a plot would eventually appear elsewhere by another writer, and so decided to use it himself.

== See also ==
- Balance of Terror (Star Trek television episode)
