= Anarchy (international relations) =

Concept in international relations theory

In international relations theory, the concept of anarchy is the idea that the world lacks any supreme authority or sovereignty. In an anarchic state, there is no hierarchically superior, coercive power that can resolve disputes, enforce law, or order the system of international politics. In international relations, anarchy is widely accepted as the starting point for international relations theory.

International relations generally does not understand "anarchy" as signifying a world in chaos, disorder, or conflict; rather, it is possible for ordered relations between states to be maintained in an anarchic international system. Anarchy provides foundations for realist, neorealist, and neoliberal, and constructivist paradigms of international relations. Liberal theory disputes that anarchy is a fundamental condition of the international system. On the other hand, constructivist scholar Alexander Wendt argued that "anarchy is what states make of it."

== Etymology ==
The word anarchy literally means "without Rulers", combining the Greek prefix "an-" meaning without, with the Indo-European root arkh meaning "begin" or "take the lead". It is adapted from the ancient Greek ἀναρχία (anarkhía) meaning "absence of a Ruler". In common usage, anarchy has come to signify both the absence of a ruling authority and the disorder that some anticipate is bound up with the absence of such an authority.

== Origin and history of term ==
The British pacifist G. Lowes Dickinson has often been credited with coining "Anarchy" as a term of art in political science in his books: The European Anarchy (1916), War: Its Nature, Cause and Cure (1923) and The International Anarchy (1926). Some argue that Dickinson used anarchy in a context that is inconsistent with modern IR theorists. Jack Donnelly argues that Philip Kerr's book Pacifism is Not Enough (1935) was first to ascribe the same meaning and context to term anarchy that modern IR theorists do.

Kenneth Waltz set off a fundamental discursive transformation in international relations with Theory of International Politics (1979). One study finds that the term "anarchy" occurred on average 6.9 times in IR books prior to 1979 but 35.5 times in IR books after 1979. A special issue of World Politics in 1985 and Robert Keohane's edited collection Neorealism and Its Critics (1986) focused extensively on Kenneth Waltz's usage of anarchy in explaining international politics. Anarchy has subsequently become fundamentally important in International Relations scholarship.

== Schools of thought ==
While the three classic schools of thought in international relations theory and their neo-counterparts (Realism, Neorealism, Liberalism, Neoliberalism and Constructivism) agree that the world system is anarchic, they differ in their explanations of how they believe states should, and do, deal with this problem.

=== Realism ===
The Realist theory of international relations asserts that states are the main power players in world politics. Realists respond to the anarchic world system by assuming a "self-help" doctrine, believing they can rely on no one but themselves for security. They believe that in the anarchical system, the basic motive of a state's behavior is survival, which they see in relative terms; holding that the increased security of one state will necessarily lead to a decrease in security of others. Thus, states are forced to constantly take into account that others might have more power than them or are planning to gain more power and are so forced to do the same, leading to competition and balancing.

According to the classic realist thinker Niccolò Machiavelli, the desire for more power is rooted in the flawed nature of humanity, which extends itself into the political world, and leads states to continuously struggle to increase their capabilities. Another traditional realist, Hans Morgenthau, claimed "international politics is struggle for power" elaborating, that "the struggle for power is universal in time and space".

Key to the realist belief is the conviction that power must be defined in military terms. Realism asserts that stronger military power will lead states to their ultimate goals, being either a hegemon for offensive realists or to a balance of power for defensive realists. In his 1988 article "Anarchy and the Limits of Cooperation", Joseph Grieco wrote: "for realists, international anarchy fosters competition and conflict among states and inhibits their willingness to cooperate even when they share common interests". Therefore, realists see no reason to believe that states can ever trust each other, and must rely on themselves (the self-help doctrine) in the anarchic world system. In the course of providing for one's own security, the state in question will automatically be fueling the insecurity of other states. This spiral of insecurity is known as the "security dilemma".

=== Neorealism ===
The realist concept of self-help as a result of anarchy is also the foundation for structural realism or neorealism. Neorealists are often referred to as structuralists as they believe that much of the important subject matter of international politics can be explained by the structure of the international system, and its central feature, anarchy. While classic realists such as Machiavelli and Morgenthau attributed power politics primarily to human nature, neorealists emphasize anarchy.

This idea was first advanced by Kenneth Waltz, in his neorealist text, Man, the State and War, and expanded on in his Theory of International Politics. For Waltz, the absence of a higher authority than states in the international system means that states can only rely on themselves for their own survival, requiring paranoid vigilance and constant preparation for conflict. In Man, the State, and War, Waltz describes anarchy as a condition of possibility or a "permissive" cause of war. He argues that "wars occur because there is nothing to prevent them". Similarly, American political scientist John Herz argues that international anarchy assures the centrality of the struggle for power "even in the absence of aggressivity or similar factors", emphasizing that a state's interests and actions are determined by the anarchic structure of the international system itself.

=== Liberalism ===
Realism and liberalism both agree that the international system is anarchic, and the self-interested state is the starting point for both theories. However, unlike realism, liberal theories argue that international institutions are able to mitigate anarchy's constraining effects on interstate cooperation. This is where the two theories diverge.

While liberal theory acknowledges that the international system is anarchic, it contends that this anarchy can be regulated with various tools, most importantly: liberal democratization, liberal economic interdependence and liberal institutionalism. The basic liberal goal is a completely interdependent world. Liberal theory asserts that the existence and spread of free trade reduces the likelihood of conflict, as "economically interdependent states are reluctant to become involved in militarized disputes out of fear that conflict disrupts trade and foreign investment and thus induces costs on the opponents". Liberal theory contends that it is not in a country's interest to go to war with a state with which its private economic agents maintain an extensive exchange of goods and capital.

Thus, for liberals, there is hope for world peace even under anarchy, if states seek common ground, forming alliances and institutions for policing the world powers. Realists tend to believe that power is gained through war or the threat of military action, and assert that due to this power-grabbing system there is no such thing as lasting alliances or peace. Liberal thought however, attributes more power to common institutions than to states, and takes into account the individual attributes that states possess, allowing for the idea of lasting alliances based on common beliefs and ideas. Rather than focusing solely on the military survival of states, liberals believe that common ideas can lead states into interdependence, and so remove allies as threats to sovereignty. Liberalism emphasizes that the real power for states comes from mutually held ideas like religion, language, economics, and political systems that will lead states to form alliances and become interdependent.

This sentiment is summed up by Norman Angell, a classical London School of Economics liberal, who claimed: "We cannot ensure the stability of the present system by the political or military preponderance of our nation or alliance by imposing its will on a rival".

=== Neoliberalism ===
Neoliberalism, the process of implementing liberalism's political ideology, seeks to counter the neo-realist claim that institutions are unable to "mitigate anarchy's constraining effects on inter-state cooperation". Neo-liberalism argues that even in an anarchic system of states, cooperation can emerge through the building of norms, regimes, and institutions. Neo-liberal thought contends that the "importance and effect" of the anarchic nature of the international system has been exaggerated, and asserts that nation-states are, or at least should be, concerned first and foremost with absolute gains rather than relative gains to other nation-states. (Hatrick Khosa, 2019)

For example, realists and neorealists assume that security is a competitive and relative concept, whereby the "gain of security for any one state means the loss of security for another". However, neoliberals argue that states should recognize that security can be cooperative or collective, whereby states can increase their security without decreasing the security of others, or recognizing that the security of other states can in fact be valuable to themselves. Therefore, while both neoliberal and neo-realist theories consider the state and its interests as the central subject of analysis, the neoliberal argument is focused on what it perceives as the neorealists' underestimation of "the varieties of cooperative behavior possible within ... a decentralized system".

=== Constructivism ===
While the concept of anarchy is the foundation for realist, liberal, neorealist, and neoliberal international relations theories, constructivist theory disputes that anarchy is a fundamental condition of the international system. Alexander Wendt, the most influential modern constructivist thinker, is often quoted for writing, "Anarchy is what states make of it". That is to say, anarchy is not inherent in the international system in the way in which other schools of IR theory envision it, but rather it is a construct of the states in the system. At the core of constructivist thought is the idea that, contrary to the assumptions of neorealism and neoliberalism, many core aspects of international relations are socially constructed (they are given their form by ongoing processes of social practice and interaction), rather than inherent. Wendt lists the two basic tenets of constructivism as:

- The structures of human association are determined primarily by shared ideas rather than material forces
- The identities and interests of purposive actors are constructed by these shared ideas rather than given by nature

Moreover, borrowing from the ideas of sociologist Anthony Giddens, Wendt suggests that agents (in this case states) can influence the content and effects of a particular structure (in this case anarchy) through the way they act. Constructivism's formative period in the 1980s came at a time when neorealism was the dominant international relations discourse. As such, constructivism's initial theoretical work focuses on challenging basic neorealist assumptions. For example, while neorealists argue that anarchy forces states to act in certain ways, constructivism challenges this assumption by arguing that the emphasis neorealists assign to structure is misplaced, and that the attributes of anarchy are not inherent, but constructed by "social practice".

Constructivists, namely Wendt, assert that neorealism's "structure" in fact fails to predict "whether two states will be friends or foes, will recognize each other's sovereignty, will have dynastic ties, will be revisionist or status quo powers, and so on". Wendt expands on this core constructivist idea by asserting that anarchy is not intrinsically a self-help system, and the way states react to anarchy depends on the way in which they perceive it. If, Wendt argues, states can recognize that security can be co-operative or collective, whereby states can increase their security without decreasing the security of others, or recognizing that the security of other states can in fact be valuable to themselves, anarchy would not lead to self-help at all.

Thus, constructivists assert that through their practices, states can either maintain this culture of anarchy or disrupt it, in turn either validating or questioning the normative basis of the international system itself. For constructivists it is even possible that some as yet unknown way of looking at the situation could emerge as people adjust their ideas about war and socially acceptable reactions to different situations.

The constructivist sentiment is summed up in the following extract from Wendt's seminal constructivist text, Anarchy is what states make of it:
"I argue that self-help and power politics do not follow either logically or casually from anarchy and that if today we find ourselves in a self-help world, this is due to process, not structure. There is no "logic" of anarchy apart from the practices that create and instantiate one structure of identities and interests rather than another; structure has no existence or casual powers apart from process. Self-help and power politics are institutions, not essential features, of anarchy. Anarchy is what states make of it".

=== Critiques, syntheses, and extensions ===
Many scholars have found the traditional paradigms of international relations to be either fundamentally problematic or too simplistic to be of use. David Lake, for example, argues that the "-isms" have impeded theoretical progress rather than enhancing it and that they should be discarded. Gideon Rose coined the term "neoclassical realism" to describe scholars who sought to enrich neorealism with insights from traditional or classical realism. John H. Herz sought to synthesize realism and liberalism into what he called "realist liberalism." Bear F. Braumoeller derived and tested a theory that combines realism and liberalism and showed that neither was sufficient to explain Great Power behavior without the other.

== Challenges ==
Some scholars argue that the international system is not anarchic, but rather that it entails hierarchies. Other scholars, such as Charles Kindleberger, Stephen D. Krasner, and Robert Gilpin, argued that the international system is characterized by hegemony, which alters and mitigates the effects of anarchy.

A 2025 study in World Politics showed through formal modelling that a monopoly on violence in the international system would not necessarily produce more order and peace than an international order with multiple holders of violent capabilities. The authors show that it is possible for states in anarchy to construct self-enforcing institutions that maintain peace.

== See also ==
- Amity-enmity complex
- International law
- Power politics
- Power Politics (Wight book)
- State collapse
