= Bandwagoning =

International relations phenomena

Bandwagoning in international relations occurs when a state aligns with a stronger, adversarial power and concedes that the stronger adversary-turned-partner disproportionately gains in the spoils they conquer together. Bandwagoning, therefore, is a strategy employed by states that find themselves in a weak position. The logic stipulates that an outgunned, weaker state should align itself with a stronger adversary because the latter can take what it wants by force anyway. Thucydides' famous dictum that "the strong do what they can and the weak suffer what they must" captures the essence of bandwagoning.

Bandwagoning occurs when weaker states decide that the cost of opposing a stronger power exceeds the benefits. The stronger power may offer incentives, such as the possibility of territorial gain, trade agreements, or protection, to induce weaker states to join with it.

Realism predicts that states will bandwagon only when there is no possibility of building a balancing coalition or their geography makes balancing difficult (i.e. surrounded by enemies). Bandwagoning is considered to be dangerous because it allows a rival state to gain power.

Bandwagoning is opposed to balancing, which calls for a state to prevent an aggressor from upsetting the balance of power.

== Etymology ==
Bandwagoning was coined by Quincy Wright in A Study of War (1942) and popularized by Kenneth Waltz in Theory of International Politics (1979); in his work, Waltz incorrectly attributes Stephen Van Evera with having coined the term. Both Wright and Waltz employ the concept to serve as the opposite of balancing behaviour.

== Foreign policy commitments ==
The belief that states will ally with a dominant power, as opposed to balance against it, has been a common feature among foreign policy practitioners. German Admiral Alfred von Tirpitz's "risk theory", for example, posited that if Germany built a formidable naval fleet, it could force the United Kingdom into neutrality or alliance with it by threatening to the latter's maritime supremacy.

According to Stephen Walt, "American officials have repeatedly embraced the bandwagoning hypothesis in justifying American foreign policy commitments." John F. Kennedy, for example, stated that "if the United States were to falter, the whole world... would inevitably begin to move toward the Communist bloc". Henry Kissinger suggested that states tend to bandwagon "if leaders around the world... assume that the U.S. lacked either the forces or the will... they will accommodate themselves to the dominant trend".

Ronald Reagan endorsed the same sentiment when he said, "If we cannot defend ourselves [in Central America], we cannot expect to prevail elsewhere. Our credibility would collapse, our alliances would crumble and the safety of our homeland would be put at jeopardy."

== See also ==
- Bandwagon (disambiguation)
- Bandwagon effect (also describes the origin of the phrase)
- Finlandization

== Sources ==
- Brown, Seyom (1994). The Faces of Power: Constancy and Change in United States Foreign Policy from Truman to Clinton (2nd ed.). New York: Columbia University Press. ISBN 978-0-231-09669-0.
- Craig, Gordon A. (1978). Germany: 1866–1945. Oxford: Clarendon Press (published 1999). ISBN 978-0-19-822113-5.
- Langer, William L. (1953). The Diplomacy of Imperialism. New York: Alfred A. Knopf.
- Mearsheimer, John J. (2001). The Tragedy of Great Power Politics. New York: W.W. Norton and Company (published 2003). ISBN 978-0-393-07624-0.
- Motin, Dylan (2024). Bandwagoning in International Relations: China, Russia, and Their Neighbors. Wilmington: Vernon Press. ISBN 978-1-64889-833-4.
- Schweller, Randall L. (1997). "New Realist Research on Alliances: Refining, Not Refuting". American Political Science Review. 91 (4): 927–930. doi:10.2307/2952176. ISSN 0003-0554. JSTOR 2952176. S2CID 143586186.
- Strassler, Robert (1998). The Landmark Thucydides: A Comprehensive Guide to the Peloponnesian War. New York: Simon and Schuster. ISBN 978-1-4391-0659-4.
- Walt, Stephen M. (1985). "Alliance Formation and the Balance of World Power" (PDF). International Security. 9 (4): 3–43. doi:10.2307/2538540. ISSN 0162-2889. JSTOR 2538540. S2CID 7418197.
- Waltz, Kenneth (1979). Theory of International Politics. Long Grove, Illinois: Waveland Press (published 2010). ISBN 978-1-57766-670-7.
- Wright, Quincy (1942). A Study of War.
