= Randall Schweller =

American academic (born 1958)

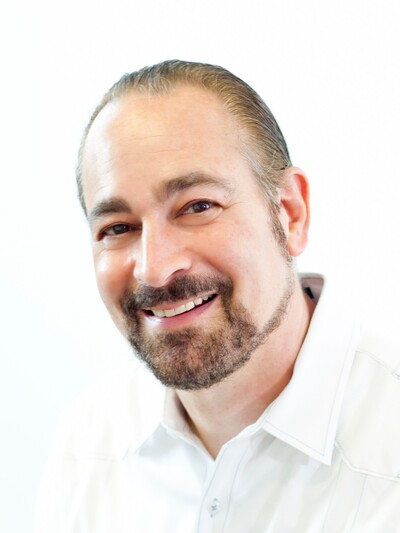
- Known for: Revisionist and Status-Quo States; Balances of Interests theory; International bandwagoning

Academic background
- Education: SUNY Stony Brook (B.A.) Columbia University (M.A., M.Phil., Ph.D.)
- Influences: Thomas Schelling, Stephen Walt, Robert Jervis

Academic work
- School or tradition: Neoclassical realism
- Institutions: Ohio State University
- Influenced: Shiping Tang, Jessica L.P. Weeks

Randall L. Schweller (born 1958) is Professor of Political Science at the Ohio State University, where he has taught since 1994. He is a current member of the International Security editorial board and former Editor-in-Chief of the journal Security Studies.

He earned his PhD from Columbia University in 1993 and was as an Olin Fellow at Harvard University in 1993-94. His primary teaching and research interests include international security and international relations theory, and he is perhaps best known for his Balance of Interests theory, a revision to Kenneth Waltz's Balance of Power theory and Stephen Walt's Balance of Threat theory. His work on this subject includes: Randall Schweller, "Tripolarity and the Second World War", International Studies Quarterly 37:1 (March 1993) and Randall Schweller, Deadly Imbalances: Tripolarity and Hitler's Strategy of World Conquest (Columbia University Press, 1998).

Often associated with Structural Realists like Kenneth Waltz and Stephen Walt, he may more accurately be portrayed as a Neoclassical Realist (a term coined by Gideon Rose) because of his willingness to consider non-structural explanations of state behavior (other neoclassical realists include Fareed Zakaria, Thomas J. Christensen, and William Wohlforth). For instance: Randall Schweller and David Priess, "A Tale of Two Realisms: Expanding the Institutions Debate," Mershon International Studies Review 41:2 (April 1997)

He is also credited with reemphasizing the distinction between status-quo and revisionist states and incorporating that difference into realist theories of state behavior. Randall Schweller, "Bandwagoning for Profit: Bringing the Revisionist State Back in", International Security 19:1 (Summer 1994) and Randall Schweller, "Neorealism's Status-Quo Bias: What Security Dilemma?" Security Studies 5:3 (Spring 1996).

Schweller is an avid guitarist and fronted a cover band of the Grateful Dead named "Timberwolf."

== Bibliography ==
=== Books ===
- Deadly Imbalances: Tripolarity and Hitler's Strategy of World Conquest (Columbia University Press, 1998)
- Unanswered Threats: Political Constraints on the Balance of Power (Princeton University Press, 2006)
- Maxwell's Demon and the Golden Apple: Global Discord in the New Millennium (Johns Hopkins University, 2014)
- Broken Cycle: World Politics in the Age of Dissent (Cambridge University Press, 2026)

=== Articles ===
- "Bandwagoning for Profit: Bringing the Revisionist State Back in", International Security 19:1 (Summer 1994)
- "Neorealism's Status-Quo Bias: What Security Dilemma?" Security Studies 5:3 (Spring 1996); collected in Benjamin Frankel, ed., Realism: Restatements and Renewal (London and NY: Frank Cass, 1996)
- "Realism and The Present Great-Power System: Growth and Positional Competition Over Scarce Resources," in Ethan Kapstein and Michael Mastanduno, eds., Unipolar Politics: Realism and State Strategies After the Cold War (New York: Columbia University Press, 1999)
- "Managing the Rise of Great Powers: History and Theory," in Alastair Iain Johnston and Robert Ross, eds., Engaging China: Managing a Rising Power (London and New York: Routledge Press, 1999).
- "U.S. Democracy Promotion: Realist Reflections," in Takashi Inoguchi, G. John Ikenberry, and Michael Cox, eds., American Democracy Promotion: Impulses, Strategies and Impacts (Oxford: Oxford University Press, 2000).
- "Power Test: Updating Realism In Response to the End of the Cold War," Security Studies, Vol. 9, No. 3 (Spring 2000), co-authored with William Wohlforth
- "New Realist Research on Alliances: Refining, Not Refuting, Waltz's Balancing Proposition," reprinted in John Vasquez and Colin Elman, eds., Realism and the Balancing of Power: The New Debate (New York: Prentice Hall, 2003).
- "The Progressiveness of Neoclassical Realism," in Colin Elman and Miriam Fendius Elman, eds., Progress in International Relations Theory: Appraising the Field (Cambridge Mass.: MIT Press, 2003).
- "Ennui Becomes Us," The National Interest, No. 105 (Jan/Feb 2010)
- "Entropy and the Trajectory of World Politics: Why Polarity Has Become Less Meaningful," Cambridge Review of International Affairs, Vol. 23, No. 1 (March 2010)
- "The Logic and Illogic of Contemporary Realism," International Theory, Vol. 2, Issue 3 (December 2010)
- "Time's Entropy: The Coming Ennui of World Disorder" Security Studies Program Seminar, (October 2010)
- "Knowing the Unknown Unknowns: Misplaced Certainty and the Onset of War," Security Studies, Vol. 20, No. 1 (Jan-March 2011), co-authored with Jennifer Mitzen
- "The Future is Uncertain and the End is Always Near," Cambridge Review of International Affairs, Vol. 24, No. 2 (September 2011)
- "Rational Theory for a Bygone Era," Security Studies, Vol. 20 (September 2011)
- "Emerging Powers in the Age of Disorder." Global Governance, Vol. 17, No. 3 (July-Sept. 2011)
- "After Unipolarity: China's Vision of International Order in an Era of U.S. Decline" International Security, Vol. 36, No. 1 (Summer 2011), co-authored with Xiaoyu Pu
- "Weltweiter Unfriede im Zeitalter der Entropie: Weshalb die Vorstellung einer globalen Führungsmacht nicht mehr zeitgemäß ist," [Worldwide Strife in the Age of Entropy: Why the Idea of a Global Leading Power is No Longer Appropriate], Internationale Politik und Gesellschaft, ipg-journal (August 2014)
- "China's Aspirations and the Clash of Nationalisms in East Asia: A Neoclassical Realist Examination," International Journal of Korean Unification Studies, Vol. 23, No. 2 (December 2014)
- "Rising Powers and Revisionism in Emerging International Orders," Paper #16, Valdai Institute Publication, Russia (May 2015)
- "The Balance of Power in World Politics," Oxford Research Encyclopedia, Politics, Oxford University Press (2016)
- "The Concept of Middle Power," in Victor D. Cha and Marie Dumond, eds., The Korean Pivot: The Study of South Korea as a Global Power (Washington, D.C.: Center for Strategic and International Studies (July 2017)
- "Why Trump Now: A Third-Image Explanation," in Chaos in the Liberal Order: The Trump Presidency and International Politics in the Twenty-First Century., edited by Robert Jervis, Francis Gavin, Joshua Rovner, and Diane Labrosse (Columbia University Press, 2018)
- "Opposite but Compatible Nationalisms: A Neoclassical Realist Approach to the Future of US-China Relations," The Chinese Journal of International Politics, Vol. 11, Issue 1 (March 2018)
- "Anarchy: Revisiting G. John Ikenberry's After Victory," The British Journal of International Relations, Vol. 20, Issue 3 (August 2018)
- "Three Cheers for Trump's Foreign Policy," Foreign Affairs, Vol. 97, No. 5 (September/October 2018)
- "Has Trump's Foreign Policy Been Successful? A Four-Part Debate," Pairagraph (October 7, 2020)
- "Trump's Realism," The H-Diplo/ISSF Policy Series, President Trump and IR Theory (April 2021)
- "Neorealism's Power and Restraint: A Tribute to Waltz on his 100th Birthday" Journal Of Global Strategic Studies, (December 2022)
- "A Cold Peace with China: East Asia is the Most Important Security Challenge for Trump's Second Term" The American Conservative, (September/October 2024), with Andrew Byers
- "Biden's Legacy of Unprincipled Stagnation" The American Conservative, (February 2025)
- "Trump’s Commercial Realism" H-Diplo, (June 2026)
