= FiveThirtyEight =

Defunct American political website

- Company type: Subsidiary
- Website type: Political analysis and blog
- Available in: English
- Dissolved: March 5, 2025 (20 months ago)
- Successors: Silver Bulletin and Still Counting (by Nate Silver); Strength in Numbers and FiftyPlusOne (by G. Elliott Morris)
- Owner: ABC News
- Creator: Nate Silver
- Website: Archive of site
- Commercial: Yes
- Registration: No
- Launched: March 7, 2008 (18 years ago)
- Current status: Dead. All URLs apart from the data subdomain redirect to the political news section of ABC News' website.

FiveThirtyEight, also rendered as 538, was an American website that focused on opinion poll analysis, politics, economics, and sports blogging in the United States.

The website, which took its name from the number of electors in the United States electoral college, was founded on March 7, 2008, as a polling aggregation website with a blog created by analyst Nate Silver. In August 2010, the blog became a licensed feature of The New York Times online and was renamed FiveThirtyEight: Nate Silver's Political Calculus. In July 2013, ESPN acquired FiveThirtyEight, hiring Silver as editor-in-chief and a contributor for ESPN.com; the new publication launched on March 17, 2014. Afterwards, the FiveThirtyEight blog covered a broad spectrum of subjects including politics, sports, science, economics, and popular culture. In 2018, operations were transferred from ESPN to sister property ABC News (both under parent The Walt Disney Company).

During the presidential primaries and general election of 2008 the site compiled polling data through a unique methodology derived from Silver's experience in sabermetrics to "balance out the polls with comparative demographic data". Silver weighted "each poll based on the pollster's historical track record, sample size, and recentness of the poll". Since the 2008 election, the site published articles—typically creating or analyzing statistical information—on a wide variety of topics in current politics and political news. These included a monthly update on the prospects for turnover in the Senate; federal economic policies; Congressional support for legislation; public support for health care reform, global warming legislation and LGBT rights; elections around the world; marijuana legalization; and numerous other topics. The site (as well as its founder) was best known for election forecasts, including the 2012 presidential election in which FiveThirtyEight correctly predicted the vote winner of all 50 states and the District of Columbia.

FiveThirtyEight won numerous awards, including Bloggie Awards for Best Political Coverage in 2008 and Best Weblog about Politics in 2009 as well as Webbies for Best Political Blog in 2012 and 2013. While under the ownership of ESPN in 2016, FiveThirtyEight won the Data Journalism Website of the Year award from the Global Editors Network.

Silver left in 2023, taking the rights to his forecasting model with him to his website Silver Bulletin. The site's new owner, Disney, hired G. Elliott Morris to develop a new model. On September 18, 2023, the original website domain at fivethirtyeight.com was closed, with web traffic redirected to ABC News pages, and its logo was changed to 538 instead of FiveThirtyEight. On March 5, 2025, 538 was shut down by ABC News and its staff were laid off. From about May 15, 2026, ABC removed access to the 538 archive of thousands of articles, redirecting its URL to the politics section of their news website.

== Methods ==
One aspect of the site was Silver's efforts to rank pollsters by accuracy, weight their polls accordingly, and then supplement those polls with his own electoral projections based on demographics and prior voting patterns. Silver said: "I did think there was room for a more sophisticated way of handling these things."

FiveThirtyEight weighted pollsters' historical track records through a complex methodology, and assigned them values to indicate "Pollster-Introduced Error". At its base, Silver's method is similar to other analysts' approaches to taking advantage of the multiple polls that are conducted within each state: he averaged the polling results. But especially in the early months of the election season polling in many states is sparse and episodic. The "average" of polls over an extended period (perhaps several weeks) would neither reveal the true state of voter preferences at the present time, nor provide an accurate forecast of the future. One approach to this problem was followed by Pollster.com: if enough polls were available, it computed a locally weighted moving average or LOESS.

While adopting such an approach in his own analysis, Silver reasoned that there was additional information available in polls from "similar" states that might help to fill the gaps in information about the trends in a given state. Accordingly, he adapted an approach that he had previously used in his baseball forecasting: using nearest neighbor analysis he first identified "most similar states" and then factored into his electoral projections for a given state the polling information from "similar states". He carried this approach one step further by also factoring national polling trends into the estimates for a given state. Thus, his projections were not simply based on the polling trends in a given state.

Furthermore, a basic intuition that Silver drew from his analysis of the 2008 Democratic party primary elections was that the voting history of a state or Congressional district provided clues to current voting. This is what allowed him to beat all the pollsters in his forecasts in the Democratic primaries in North Carolina and Indiana, for example. Using such information allowed Silver to come up with estimates of the vote preferences even in states for which there were few if any polls. For his general election projections for each state, in addition to relying on the available polls in a given state and "similar states", Silver estimated a "538 regression" using historical voting information along with demographic characteristics of the states to create an estimate that he treated as a separate poll (equivalent to the actually available polls from that state). This approach helped to stabilize his projections, because if there were few if any polls in a given state, the state forecast was largely determined by the 538 regression estimate.

=== Transparency of pollster ratings ===
On June 6, 2010, FiveThirtyEight posted pollster rankings that updated and elaborated Silver's efforts from the 2008 election. Silver expanded the database to more than 4,700 election polls and developed a model for rating the polls that was more sophisticated than his original rankings. Silver responded on 538: "Where's the transparency? Well, it's here [citing his June 6 article], in an article that contains 4,807 words and 18 footnotes. Every detail of how the pollster ratings are calculated is explained. It's also here [referring to another article], in the form of Pollster Scorecards, a feature which we'll continue to roll out over the coming weeks for each of the major polling firms, and which will explain in some detail how we arrive at the particular rating that we did for each one".

As for why the complete 538 polling database had not been released publicly, Silver responded: "The principal reason is because I don't know that I'm legally entitled to do so. The polling database was compiled from approximately eight or ten distinct data sources, which were disclosed in a comment which I posted shortly after the pollster ratings were released, and which are detailed again at the end of this article. These include some subscription services, and others from websites that are direct competitors of this one. Although polls contained in these databases are ultimately a matter of the public record and clearly we feel as though we have every right to use them for research purposes, I don't know what rights we might have to re-publish their data in full." Silver also commented on the fact that the 538 ratings had contributed to Markos Moulitsas's decision to end Daily Kos's use of Research 2000 as its pollster.

On June 11, 2010, Mark Blumenthal also commented on the question of transparency in an article in the National Journal titled "Transparency In Rating: Nate Silver's Impressive Ranking Of Pollsters' Accuracy Is Less Impressive In Making Clear What Data Is Used". He noted that in the case of Research 2000 there were some discrepancies between what Silver reported and what the pollster itself reported. Other researchers questioned aspects of the methodology.

On June 16, 2010, Silver announced on his blog that he is willing to give all pollsters who he had included in his rating a list of their polls that he had in his archive, along with the key information that he used (poll marginals, sample size, dates of administration); and he encouraged the pollsters to examine the lists and the results to compare them with the pollster's own record and make corrections.

In September 2014, Silver put into the public domain all of his pollster ratings, as well as descriptive summary data for all of the more than 6,600 polls in his data collection for the final three weeks of U.S. presidential primaries and general elections, state governor elections, and U.S. Senate and U.S. Congress elections for the years 1998–2012. In addition to updating his pollster ratings, he published an updated methodological report.

== History ==
=== Origins ===
Nate Silver started FiveThirtyEight in early March 2008, published under the pseudonym Poblano, the same name that he had used since November 2007 when he began publishing a diary on the political blog Daily Kos. The name FiveThirtyEight derives from the 538 electors in the United States Electoral College. Writing for Daily Kos, Silver had gained a following, especially for his primary election forecast on Super Tuesday, February 5, 2008. From that primary election day, which included contests in 24 states plus American Samoa, Poblano predicted that Barack Obama would come away with 859 delegates, and Hillary Clinton 829; in the final contests, Obama won 847 delegates and Clinton 834. Based on this result, New York Times op-ed columnist William Kristol wrote: "And an interesting regression analysis at the Daily Kos Web site (poblano.dailykos.com) of the determinants of the Democratic vote so far, applied to the demographics of the Ohio electorate, suggests that Obama has a better chance than is generally realized in Ohio".

FiveThirtyEight gained further national attention for beating out most pollsters' projections in the North Carolina and Indiana Democratic party primaries on May 6, 2008. As Mark Blumenthal wrote in National Journal, "Over the last week, an anonymous blogger who writes under the pseudonym Poblano did something bold on his blog, FiveThirtyEight.com. He posted predictions for the upcoming primaries based not on polling data, but on a statistical model driven mostly by demographic and past vote data. ... Critics scoffed. Most of the public polls pointed to a close race in North Carolina. ... But a funny thing happened. The model got it right." Silver relied on demographic data and on the history of voting in other states during the 2008 Democratic primary elections. On May 30, 2008, Silver revealed his true identity for the first time to his FiveThirtyEight readers. After that date, he published just four more diaries on Daily Kos.

As the primary season was coming to an end, Silver began to build a model for the general election race. This model, too, relied in part on demographic information but mainly involved a complex method of aggregating polling results. In 2008, Rasmussen Reports had an apparently short-term partnership with FiveThirtyEight in order to include this unique methodology for generating poll averages in their "Balance of Power Calculator". At the same time, FiveThirtyEight's daily "Today's Polls" column began to be mirrored on "The Plank", a blog published by The New Republic.

In July 2008, the site began to report regular updates of projections of 2008 U.S. Senate races. Special procedures were developed relying on both polls and demographic analysis. The projections were updated on a weekly basis. (Note: Silver, Nate. "Senate Forecast, 7/18: Republican Outlook Improves with Focus on Likely Voter Polls". FiveThirtyEight.)

By early October 2008, FiveThirtyEight approached 2.5 million visitors per week, while averaging approximately 400,000 per weekday. During October 2008 the site received 3.63 million unique visitors, 20.57 million site visits, and 32.18 million page views. On Election Day, November 4, 2008, the site had nearly 5 million page views.

==== Final projections of 2008 elections ====
In the final update of his presidential forecast model at midday of November 4, 2008, Silver projected a popular vote victory by 6.1 percentage points for Barack Obama and electoral vote totals of 349 (based on a probabilistic projection) or 353 (based on fixed projections of each state). Obama won with 365 electoral college votes. Silver's predictions matched the actual results everywhere except in Indiana and the 2nd congressional district of Nebraska, which awards an electoral vote separately from the rest of the state. His projected national popular vote differential was below the actual figure of 7.2 points.

The forecasts for the Senate proved to be correct for every race, but the near stalemate in Minnesota led to a recount that was settled only on June 30, 2009. In Alaska, after a protracted counting of ballots, on November 19 Republican incumbent Ted Stevens conceded the seat to Democrat Mark Begich, an outcome that Silver had forecast on election day. In Georgia, a run-off election on December 2 led to the re-election of Republican Saxby Chambliss, a result that was also consistent with Silver's original projection.

==== The ground game and "On the Road" ====
During the 2008 electoral campaign, Sean Quinn, a second contributor, drew on his knowledge and experience with campaign organizations to evaluate the ground game and "get out the vote" strategies of the McCain and Obama campaign teams. A poker player, Quinn drew an analogy between Barack Obama's electoral strategy and a poker player having multiple "outs" for winning a hand.

In September, Quinn launched a series of essays under the name On the Road. Quinn traveled from state to state telling the story of the campaign from the electoral battleground, drawing on observations and interviews with grassroots campaign workers.

=== After the 2008 U.S. election ===
==== Focus ====
During the first two months after the election, no major innovations in content were introduced. A substantial percentage of the articles focused on Senatorial races: the runoff in Georgia, won by Saxby Chambliss; recounts of votes in Alaska (won by Mark Begich), and Minnesota (Al Franken vs. Norm Coleman); and the appointments of Senatorial replacements in Colorado, New York, and Illinois.

After President Obama's inauguration, Sean Quinn reported that he was moving to Washington, D.C., to continue political writing from that locale. On February 4, 2009, he became the first blogger to join the White House press corps. After that time, however, he contributed only a handful of articles to FiveThirtyEight.

During the post-2008 election period Silver devoted attention to developing some tools for the analysis of forthcoming 2010 Congressional elections, as well as discussing policy issues and the policy agenda for the Obama administration, especially economic policies. He developed a list of 2010 Senate races in which he made monthly updates of predicted party turnover.

Later, Silver adapted his methods to address a variety of issues of the day, including health care reform, climate change, unemployment, and popular support for same-sex marriage. He wrote a series of columns investigating the credibility of polls by Georgia-based firm Strategic Vision, LLC. According to Silver's analysis, Strategic Vision's data displayed statistical anomalies that were inconsistent with random polling. Later, he uncovered indirect evidence that Strategic Vision may have gone as far as to fabricate the results of a citizenship survey taken by Oklahoma high school students, which led him to denounce Strategic Vision as "disreputable and fraudulent". (Note: Several national firms use the name "Strategic Vision"; only one has been releasing political polling results to the media.) FiveThirtyEight devoted more than a dozen articles to the Iranian presidential election in June 2009, assessing of the quality of the vote counting. International affairs columnist Renard Sexton began the series with an analysis of polling leading up to the election; then posts by Silver, Andrew Gelman and Sexton analyzed the reported returns and political implications.

FiveThirtyEight covered the November 3, 2009, elections in the United States in detail. FiveThirtyEight writers Schaller, Gelman, and Silver also gave extensive coverage to the January 19, 2010 Massachusetts special election to the U.S. Senate. The "538 model" once again aggregated the disparate polls to correctly predict that the Republican Scott Brown would win.

In spring 2010, FiveThirtyEight turned a focus on the United Kingdom general election scheduled for May 6, with a series of more than forty articles on the subject that culminated in projections of the number of seats that the three major parties were expected to win. Following a number of preview posts in January and February, Renard Sexton examined subjects such as the UK polling industry and the 'surge' of the third-party Liberal Democrats, while Silver, Sexton and Dan Berman (Note: Berman first worked with FiveThirtyEight when he made some provocative discoveries of anomalies in the reported results of the 2009 Election in Iran.) developed a seat projection model. The UK election was the first time the FiveThirtyEight team did an election night 'liveblog' of a non-U.S. election.

In April 2010, The Guardian published Silver's predictions for the 2010 United Kingdom General Election. The majority of polling organisations in the UK use the concept of uniform swing to predict the outcome of elections. However, by applying his own methodology, Silver produced very different results, which suggested that a Conservative victory might have been the most likely outcome. After a series of articles, including critiques and responses to other electoral analysts, his "final projection" was published on the eve of the election. In the end, Silver's projections were off the mark, particularly compared with those of some other organizations, and Silver wrote a post mortem on his blog. Silver examined the pitfalls of the forecasting process, while Sexton discussed the final government agreement between the Conservatives and the Liberal Democrats.

=== Partnership with The New York Times: 2010–2013 ===
On June 3, 2010, Silver announced that in early August the blog would be "relaunched under a NYTimes.com domain". The transition took place on August 25, 2010, with the publication of Silver's first FiveThirtyEight blog article online in The New York Times.

On June 3, 2010, The New York Times and Silver announced that FiveThirtyEight had formed a partnership under which the blog would be hosted by the Times for a period of three years. In legal terms, FiveThirtyEight granted a "license" to the Times to publish the blog. The blog would be listed under the "Politics" tab of the News section of the Times. FiveThirtyEight would thus be subject to and benefit from editing and technical production by the Times, while FiveThirtyEight would be responsible for creating the content.

Silver received bids from several major media entities before selecting the Times. Under terms of the agreement, Silver would also write monthly articles for the print version of both the newspaper and the Sunday magazine. Silver did not move his blog to the highest bidder, because he was concerned with maintaining his own voice while gaining the exposure and technical support that a larger media company could provide. "There's a bit of a Groucho Marx quality to it [Silver has said]. ... You shouldn't want to belong to any media brand that seems desperate to have you as a member, even though they'll probably offer the most cash".

The first column of the renamed FiveThirtyEight: Nate Silver's Political Calculus appeared in the Times on August 25, 2010, with the introduction of U.S. Senate election forecasts. At the same time, Silver published a brief history of the blog. All columns from the original FiveThirtyEight were also archived for public access.

Shortly after FiveThirtyEight relocated to The New York Times, Silver introduced his prediction models for the 2010 elections to the U.S. Senate, the U.S. House of Representatives, and state Governorships. Each of these models relied initially on a combination of electoral history, demographics, and polling. The 538 model had forecast a net pickup of 8 seats by the Republicans in the Senate and 55 seats in the House, close to the actual outcome of a pickup of 6 seats in the Senate and 63 seats in the House.

=== Writers ===
When the transition to The New York Times was announced, Silver listed his staff of writers for the first time. However, of the seven listed writers, only three of them had published on 538/New York Times by late December 2010: Silver, Renard Sexton and Hale Stewart. Andrew Gelman contributed again in early 2011. Brian McCabe published his first article in January 2011. (Note: Why other writers played only a limited role in FiveThirtyEight/NYT was explained in February 2011 in an article in Poynter.)

Beginning in 2011, one writer who emerged as a regular contributor was Micah Cohen. Cohen provided a periodic "Reads and Reactions" column in which he summarized Silver's articles for the previous couple of weeks, as well as reactions to them in the media and other blogs, and suggested some additional readings related to the subject of Silver's columns. Silver identified Cohen as "my news assistant". Cohen also contributed additional columns on occasion.

On September 12, 2011, Silver introduced another writer: "FiveThirtyEight extends a hearty welcome to John Sides, a political scientist at George Washington University, who will be writing a series of posts for this site over the next month. Mr. Sides is also the founder of the blog The Monkey Cage, which was named the 2010 Blog of the Year by The Week magazine".

=== Beyond electoral politics ===
While politics and elections remained the main focus of FiveThirtyEight, the blog also sometimes addressed sports, including the March Madness and the 2012 NCAA Men's Basketball tournament selection process, the B.C.S. rankings in NCAA college football, the NBA, and Major League Baseball matters ranging from the 2011 attendance at the New York Mets' Citi Field to the historic 2011 collapse of the Boston Red Sox. The site has also posted forecasts for the Academy Awards.

In addition, FiveThirtyEight sometimes turned its attention to other topics, such as the economics of blogging, the financial ratings by Standard & Poors, economists' tendency to underpredict unemployment levels, and the economic impact and media coverage of Hurricane Irene (2011).

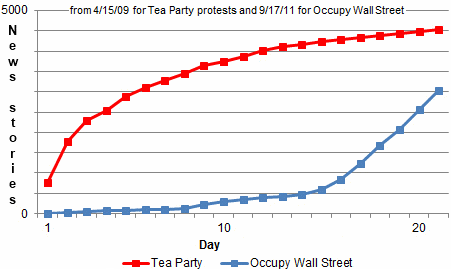
Adapted from a FiveThirtyEight October 2011 graph published in The New York Times

FiveThirtyEight published a graph showing different growth curves of the news stories covering Tea Party and Occupy Wall Street protests. Silver pointed out that conflicts with the police caused the sharpest increases in news coverage of the protests and assessed the geography of the protests by analyzing news reports of the size and location of events across the United States.

=== 2012 U.S. elections ===
FiveThirtyEight rolled out its 2012 general election forecasting model on June 7, 2012. The model forecast both the popular vote and the Electoral College vote, with the latter being central to the exercise and involving a forecast of each state. In the initial forecast, Barack Obama was estimated to have a 61.8% chance of winning the electoral vote. The website provided maps and statistics about the electoral outcomes in each state as well as nationally. Later posts addressed methodological issues such as the "house effects" of different pollsters as well as the validity of telephone surveys that did not call cell phones.

On the morning of November 6, Election Day, Silver's model gave President Obama a 90.9% chance of winning a majority of the electoral votes. The 538 model correctly predicted the winner of all 50 states and the District of Columbia. (Note: Although Silver put a "toss-up" tag on the presidential election in Florida, his interactive electoral map on the website painted the state light blue and stated that there was a 50.3% probability that Obama would win a plurality of the state's votes.) Silver, along with at least two academic-based analysts who aggregated polls from multiple pollsters, thus not only correctly predicted all 50 states, but also all nine "swing states". In contrast, individual pollsters were less successful. For example, Rasmussen Reports "missed on six of its nine swing-state polls".

An independent analysis of Silver's state-by-state projections, assessing whether the percentages of votes that the candidates actually received fell within the "margin of error" of Silver's forecasts, found that "48 out of 50 states actually fell within his margin of error, giving him a success rate of 96%. And assuming that his projected margin of error figures represent 95 percent confidence intervals, which it is likely they did, Silver performed just about exactly as well as he would expect to over 50 trials. Wizard, indeed". Additional tests of the accuracy of the electoral vote predictions were published by other researchers.

=== ESPN and ABC News affiliation ===
In July 2013, it was revealed that Silver and his FiveThirtyEight blog would depart The New York Times and join ESPN. In its announcement of its acquisition of FiveThirtyEight, ESPN reported that "Silver will serve as the editor-in-chief of the site and will build a team of journalists, editors, analysts and contributors in the coming months. Much like Grantland, which ESPN launched in 2011, the site will retain an independent brand sensibility and editorial point-of-view, while interfacing with other websites in the ESPN and Disney families. The site will return to its original URL, www.FiveThirtyEight.com."

According to Silver, the focus of FiveThirtyEight in its ESPN phase would broaden: "People also think it's going to be a sports site with a little politics thrown in, or it's going to be a politics site with sports thrown in. ... But we take our science and economics and lifestyle coverage very seriously. ... It's a data journalism site. Politics is one topic that sometimes data journalism is good at covering. It's certainly good with presidential elections. But we don't really see politics as how the site is going to grow".

FiveThirtyEight launched its ESPN webpage on March 17, 2014. The lead story by Silver explained that "FiveThirtyEight is a data journalism organization. ... We've expanded our staff from two full-time journalists to 20 and counting. Few of them will focus on politics exclusively; instead, our coverage will span five major subject areas – politics, economics, science, life and sports. Our team also has a broad set of skills and experience in methods that fall under the rubric of data journalism. These include statistical analysis, but also data visualization, computer programming and data-literate reporting. So in addition to written stories, we'll have interactive graphics and features". FiveThirtyEight launched its ESPN-affiliated stage on March 17, 2014. As of July, it had a staff of 20 writers, editors, data visualization specialists, and others. By March 2016, this staff had nearly doubled to 37 listed on the masthead, and 7 listed as contributors. The site produced articles under 5 headings: politics, economics, science and health, (cultural) life, and sports. In addition to feature articles it produced podcasts on a range of subjects.

Monthly traffic to the site grew steadily from about 2.8 million unique visitors in April 2014 to 10.7 million unique visitors in January 2016.

=== 2014 U.S. elections ===
On September 3, 2014, FiveThirtyEight introduced its forecasts for each of the 36 U.S. Senate elections being contested that year. At that time, the Republican Party was given a 64 percent chance of holding a majority of the seats in the Senate after the election. However, Silver also remarked, "An equally important theme is the high degree of uncertainty around that outcome. A large number of states remain competitive, and Democrats could easily retain the Senate". About two weeks later, the forecast showed the Republican chances of holding the majority down to 55 percent.

=== 2016 Oscars predictions ===
FiveThirtyEight sought to apply its mathematical models to the Oscars, and produced internal predictions regarding the subject, predicting four out of six categories correctly. The website also compiled a list of other predictions made by other people using different methods.

=== 2016 U.S. elections ===
==== Presidential primary elections ====
FiveThirtyEight applied two separate models to forecast the 2016 presidential primary elections – polls-only and polls-plus models. The polls-only model relied only on polls from a particular state, while the polls-plus model was based on state polls, national polls and endorsements. For each contest, FiveThirtyEight produced probability distributions and average expected vote shares according to both models.

As early as June 2015, FiveThirtyEight argued that Donald Trump "isn't a real candidate". When Donald Trump became the presumptive Republican nominee in May 2016, New York Times media columnist Jim Rutenberg wrote that "predictions can have consequences" and criticized FiveThirtyEight for underestimating Trump's chances. He argued that by giving "Mr. Trump a 2 percent chance at the nomination despite strong polls in his favor ... they also arguably sapped the journalistic will to scour his record as aggressively as those of his supposedly more serious rivals".

In a long retrospective, "How I Acted Like a Pundit and Screwed up on Donald Trump", published in May 2016 after Trump had become the presumptive nominee, Silver reviewed how he had erred in evaluating Trump's chances early in the primary campaign. Silver wrote, "The big mistake is a curious one for a website that focuses on statistics. Unlike virtually every other forecast we publish at FiveThirtyEight – including the primary and caucus projections I just mentioned – our early estimates of Trump's chances weren't based on a statistical model. Instead, they were what we [call] 'subjective odds' – which is to say, educated guesses. In other words, we were basically acting like pundits, but attaching numbers to our estimates. And we succumbed to some of the same biases that pundits often suffer, such as not changing our minds quickly enough in the face of new evidence. Without a model as a fortification, we found ourselves rambling around the countryside like all the other pundit-barbarians, randomly setting fire to things".

On the Democratic side, FiveThirtyEight argued that Senator Bernie Sanders could "lose everywhere else after Iowa and New Hampshire" and that the "Democratic establishment would rush in to squash" him if he does not. Sanders went on to win 23 states in the primaries.

Fairness and Accuracy in Reporting, a progressive nonprofit media watch group, wrote in May 2016 that FiveThirtyEight "sacrificed its integrity to go after Sanders" and that they have "at times gone beyond the realm of punditry into the realm of hackery – that is, not just treating their own opinions as though they were objective data, but spinning the data so that it conforms to their opinions."

FiveThirtyEight's predictions for each state primary, both for the Republican and the Democratic party nominations, were based on statistical analysis, not on the analyst's opinions. The core data employed were polls, which FiveThirtyEight aggregated for each state (while also considering national polls) using essentially the same method it had employed since 2008. In the 2016 primaries, the projections also took into account endorsements. The website also kept track of the accumulation of national party convention delegates. In a comparison of prediction success published by Bloomberg News after the primary season was completed, FiveThirtyEight's prediction success tied for the highest percentage of correct primary poll winners, at 92%; but it lagged behind PredictWise in predicting a larger set of primaries. Notably, even with FiveThirtyEight's track record of correctly predicting elections that pollsters get wrong, it still missed Bernie Sanders's upset victory in the Michigan primary, for instance, regarded as "one of the biggest upsets in modern political history".

==== Presidential general election ====
The final prediction by FiveThirtyEight on the morning of election day (November 8, 2016) had Hillary Clinton with a 71% chance to win the 2016 United States presidential election, while other major forecasters had predicted Clinton to win with at least an 85% to 99% probability. FiveThirtyEight's model pointed to the possibility of an Electoral College-popular vote split widening in final weeks based on both Clinton's small lead in general polls, but also on Trump's improvement in swing states like Florida or Pennsylvania, mixed with Clinton's poor performance in several of those swing states in comparison with Obama's performance in 2012. The main issues pointed out by the forecast model was the imbalance of Clinton's improvement in very populated states like Texas, Georgia (projected safe for Republican) and California (projected safe for Democrats); mixed with her inability to attract white voters without a college degree, an increasing demographic in swing states, in addition to a potential decline in turnout from minorities. In consequence, Clinton's probabilities to win the Electoral College were not improving. Silver also focused on state-by-state numbers in so-called 'must-win' states like Ohio and Florida, plus a consideration of polls' margin of error in advantages of less than three points.

Donald Trump won the election. FiveThirtyEight projected a much higher probability of Donald Trump winning the presidency than other pollsters, a projection which was criticized by Ryan Grim of the Huffington Post as "unskewing" too much in favor of Trump. While FiveThirtyEight expressed that "nonetheless, Clinton is probably going to win, and she could win by a big margin", the forecaster also made points about the uncertainty of poll trackers in some cases, the considerable number of undecided voters, and the unpredictable outcome in traditional swing states.

In April 2018, it was announced that FiveThirtyEight would be transferred from ESPN, Inc. to ABC News, majority owned by The Walt Disney Company. ABC News Live streaming channel was launched on Roku in May 2019. After Disney's business reorganiziation which created the Walt Disney Direct-to-Consumer and International business segment in March 2018, ABC News Digital and Live Streaming (websites, ABC News Live and FiveThirtyEight) were transferred to the new segment.

=== 2020 U.S. elections ===
==== Redesign of forecast ====
In early August 2020, FiveThirtyEight announced that for their 2020 general election forecast they had designed a new graphical structure. This included going with modular structure, a "ball swarm" design for the chart depicting each candidate's chances, and the addition of a "forecast mascot" named Fivey Fox. An episode of "Chart Chat" discussing the design described the direction saying "FiveThirtyEight has leaned heavily towards a cutesy and engaging approach. The Fivey Fox mascot pops up next to most charts with call-outs to more further information."

Fivey Fox would also issue reminders to readers of "the potential for extreme outcomes" according to Jessica Hullman, in a piece written for The Hill. Hullman also said of the design that the introduction of the mascot, in conjunction with the new simplified look of the page, was "perhaps the strongest indicator that Silver intends to emphasize uncertainty" in his coverage of the 2020 election.

Jasmine Mithani, visual journalist with FiveThirtyEight, said in an interview when asked about the complaints of new mascot said "I think the biggest complaint about Fivey Fox is that some people find it infantilizing, but that wasn't our intention" and that the motivation for including the character was to help make the forecast more of "a teaching tool". In November 2020, Rolling Stone reported that Fivey Fox had reached over 7,000 followers on his dedicated Twitter account.

The forecast favored the actual winner of 48 states, the District of Columbia, and four of the five congressional districts awarding electoral votes, only missing Florida, North Carolina, and Maine's 2nd congressional district. In those three contests the forecast had favored Biden, but they were carried by Trump. Despite correctly forecasting Biden to win nationally, they overestimated Biden's margins in some battleground states such as Wisconsin, Michigan and Pennsylvania and underestimated Trump's margins in states such as Ohio, Iowa and Texas. Their forecast showed Democrats winning Senate races in North Carolina and Maine, which Republicans ended up winning. However, their forecast did correctly predict that the Democrats would take control of the Senate. In the House elections, their forecast favored Democrats to gain seats, yet Democrats suffered a net loss of 10 seats. The actual house results fell outside their 80% confidence interval, with Democrats winning 222 seats, lower than the confidence interval's lower bound of 225.

=== Silver's exit, 2024 U.S. elections and shutdown ===
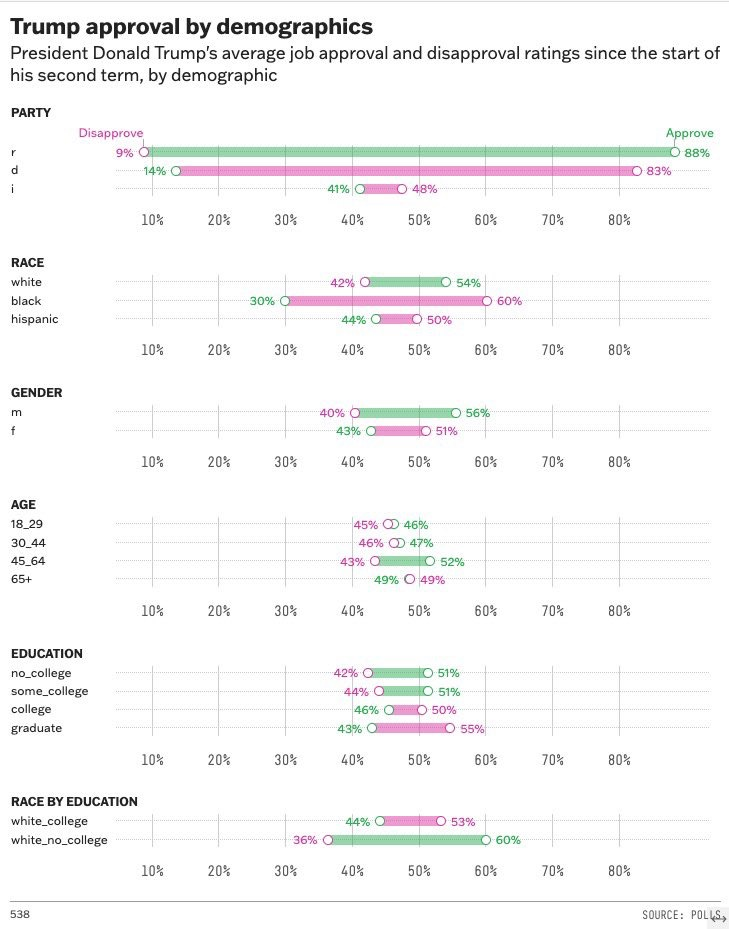
Trump's approval at the start of his second term; this was part of an unpublished article due to the website being shut down.

In January 2023, The Daily Beast reported that the website was on the "chopping block" amid cost-cutting measures by ABC News, and a sale of the website was being considered. It also noted that several key employees including managing editor Micah Cohen, politics editor Sarah E. Frostenson and sports editor Sara Ziegler had left the website and their positions had not been filled. An ABC spokesperson responded to the report, asserting "no imminent decisions about [its] relationship with FiveThirtyEight." Nonetheless, in April, Silver announced that he would be leaving the site amid widespread layoffs at ABC News, who said the website would be "streamlined" ahead of the 2024 election cycle; editor Chadwick Matlin was among the many laid off. According to Silver, two thirds of FiveThirtyEight's staff were cut in one day. After the layoffs, FiveThirtyEight's sports and science coverage ground to a halt, with the website mostly returning to its roots of exclusive politics coverage.

Logo rendered as 538 used from 2023 until 2025

In May 2023, ABC News hired G. Elliott Morris, a data journalist for The Economist who has often been described as a rival of Silver, to head the site as editorial director of data analytics. On September 18, 2023, the original website domain at fivethirtyeight.com was closed, with web traffic becoming redirected to ABC News pages, and its logo was replaced, with the name 538 used instead of FiveThirtyEight. At 538, Morris developed a new election forecasting model of the 2024 election. In the leadup to Biden's withdrawal, 538 was the only professional election forecaster to give Biden majority odds of winning the 2024 election. Silver criticized Morris's model, describing it as at best ignoring the polls and giving Biden positive odds merely due to his incumbency, and at worst as being "buggy". The election forecast remained suspended for a month after Biden withdrew, before being replaced by a new model for Kamala Harris versus Trump that put more emphasis on polling. The forecast predicted a very narrow Harris victory with her winning 270 electoral votes to Trump's 268. Trump won the election with 312 electoral votes to Harris's 226.

==== 2025 shutdown and 2026 archive removal ====
On March 5, 2025, the Walt Disney Company, ABC's parent company, shut down 538 and laid off about 15 employees. ABC News announced that it would continue to provide polling data and analysis outside of the 538 brand. After departing the site, Silver began publishing a personal blog, Silver Bulletin. In May 2025, Morris announced a newsletter, Strength in Numbers, which he said he intends to expand into a successor to FiveThirtyEight.

On May 15, 2026, ABC redirected all 538 articles, which had been archived on an earlier version of the site (fivethiryeight.com), to the politics section of the ABC News website (abcnews.com/politics), making all 538 content inaccessible. Silver said that ABC were "a bunch of assholes" and that the ABC decision was driven by vindictiveness towards Silver. Silver attempted to buy back 538's IP rights but claimed ABC told him they would not sell for any price because he had criticized their management. Silver mourned the loss of the archives, saying "all the work that's been done, you know, groundbreaking work covering this remarkable period in American politics, is lost."

== Recognition and awards ==
- In September 2008, FiveThirtyEight became the first blog ever selected as a Notable Narrative by the Nieman Foundation for Journalism at Harvard University. According to the Foundation, "In his posts, former economic analyst and baseball-stats wunderkind Nate Silver explains the presidential race, using the dramatic tension inherent in the run-up to Election Day to drive his narrative. Come November 5, we will have a winner and a loser, but in the meantime, Silver spins his story from the myriad polls that confound us lesser mortals".
- The New York Times described FiveThirtyEight in November 2008 as "one of the breakout online stars of the year".
- Huffington Post columnist Jason Linkins named FiveThirtyEight as No. 1 of "Ten Things that Managed to Not Suck in 2008, Media Edition".
- FiveThirtyEight is the 2008 Weblog Award Winner for "Best Political Coverage".
- FiveThirtyEight earned a 2009 "Bloggie" as the "Best Weblog about Politics" in the 9th Annual Weblog Awards.
- In April 2009, Silver was named "Blogger of the Year" in the 6th Annual Opinion Awards of The Week, for his work on FiveThirtyEight.
- In September 2009, FiveThirtyEight's predictive model was featured as the cover story in STATS: The Magazine for Students of Statistics.
- In November 2009, FiveThirtyEight was named one of "Our Favorite Blogs of 2009" ("Fifty blogs we just can't get enough of") by PC Magazine.
- In December 2009, FiveThirtyEight was recognized by The New York Times Magazine in its "Ninth Annual Year in Ideas" for conducting "Forensic Polling Analysis" detective work on the possible falsification of polling data by a major polling firm. (Note: The first of a series of articles challenged Strategic Vision LLC to reveal key information.)
- In November 2010, editor-in-chief of Politico John F. Harris, writing in Forbes magazine, listed Silver as one of seven bloggers among "The Most Powerful People on Earth".
- In June 2011, Time's "The Best Blogs of 2011" named FiveThirtyEight one of its Essential Blogs.
- May 2012: FiveThirtyEight won a Webby Award for "Best Political Blog" from the International Academy of Digital Arts and Sciences in the 16th annual Webby Awards.
- April 2013: FiveThirtyEight won a Webby Award for "Best Political Blog" from the International Academy of Digital Arts and Sciences in the 17th annual Webby Awards.
- June 2016: FiveThirtyEight was named the "Data Journalism Website of the Year" for 2016 by the Global Editors Network, a Paris-based organization that promotes innovation in newsrooms around the world. FiveThirtyEight won an additional award for "News Data App of the Year (large newsroom)" for "Swing the Election", an interactive project by Aaron Bycoffe and David Wasserman.
- September 2017: The National Academies of Sciences, Engineering, and Medicine awarded a 2017 Communication Award in the "Online" category to "FiveThirtyEight's Maggie Koerth-Baker, Ben Casselman, Anna Maria Barry-Jester, and Carl Bialik for 'Gun Deaths in America'. 'A balanced and fact-filled examination of an unfolding crisis, with compelling interactives that are meticulously attentive to data quality and statistics.' (italics in the original)
- June 2018: "The Atlas of Redistricting" was named "News App of the Year" by the Data Journalism Awards sponsored by the Global Editors Network.

== Mascot ==
Fivey Fox was the mascot of FiveThirtyEight. This is in reference to a phrase attributed to Archilochus: "The fox knows many things, but the hedgehog knows one big thing". The name "Fivey" is a reference to the website's name, FiveThirtyEight. Fivey Fox is colored orange, white, and beige with comically sized black glasses and has white colored sock-like paws.

== See also ==
- Electoral-vote.com – American political website
- Europe Elects – European election watchdog
- RealClearPolitics – Political news and polling data aggregator
- United States Electoral College – Electors of the U.S. president and vice president
