= The Art of Sanctions =

2017 book by Richard Nephew

The Art of Sanctions: A View from the Field
- Author: Richard Nephew
- Language: English
- Series: Center on Global Energy Policy Series
- Subject: Economic sanctions: International relations
- Genre: Non-fiction books about U.S. foreign policies
- Publisher: Columbia University Press
- Publication date: 12 December 2017
- Publication place: United States
- Pages: 232
- ISBN: 978-0-231-18026-9

The Art of Sanctions: A View from the Field is a 2017 book written by Richard Nephew. It discusses the role of sanctions as a foreign policy tool. Nephew’s framework rests on how targets respond to sanctions according to two central variables: pain and resolve. He argues that a sanctions regime is most effective when it inflicts as much pain as is sustainable, meaning when further escalation would produce little incremental effect. In the case of Iran, the author believes that the Joint Comprehensive Plan of Action was not a product solely of economic coercion, but rather of negotiation made possible by a successful sanctions strategy.

Richard Nephew is an adjunct professor and senior research scholar and program director at Columbia University's Center on Global Energy Policy since 1 February 2015. He also was serving as the lead sanctions expert for the U.S. team negotiating with Iran between August 2013 to December 2014. The book has been used as a guideline among the high level U.S. politicians since it was published. The book was translated to Persian in Iran in mid 2018.

== Synopsis ==
Governments, international organizations and nations are increasingly turning to sanctions as a foreign policy tool. Sanctions will lose their efficiency, changing the behavior of the target entity, if they are used without a clear strategy. "The Art of Sanctions" offers a series of acts that can improve the efficiency of sanctions, such as a framework for planning and applying sanctions.

Nephew introduces sanctions as a strategic tool in U.S. foreign policy and explains them as an art whose efficacy depends on decision makers' creativity and their manipulation of using the economic, social and political tools as the sanction's tools. He illustrates that sanctions often prohibit the export of ordinary goods to the target country, while restrictions on luxury goods can undermine the public’s sense of normalcy and social morale. For example, the rise in chicken prices in Iran - a product not directly sanctioned - intensified the perceived pressure of sanctions among the population. The controlled export of certain goods to Iran forced the government to spend its foreign currency reserves, draining them and amplifying the sanctions’ overall impact.

Pain and resolve are two key variables of sanctions; the relationship between a target's ability to resolve the pain and pressure of the sanctions is the most important factor for politicians. Nephew believes the efficacy of sanctions relies on the use of pain against a target, while the target may decide to resolve, resist or deactivate this pain. Finding the role of pain and resolve is important in using sanctions successfully. Considering these two factors and finding their sensitivity during the sanction's course helps policy makers or politicians to calibrate, ease or remove the sanction's pressure.

== Reception ==
Daniel Fried, a former U.S. diplomat, wrote about the book; "Nephew has manipulated a practical book about the sanction. Everybody who [is] concerned about North Korea, Russia and Iran, should read this book."

Robert Einhorn, a former senior adviser of the U.S. State Department's Nonproliferation Bureau and a member of the Brookings Institution, wrote; "Nephew has written an interesting book according his experiences as an American negotiator and sanction's plan creator. Sanctions have become a critical tool for U.S. foreign policy system and this book must be read by governors and experts who work on North Korea, Iran and Russia. The book is a great guide for [those] who want to create sanctions against the countries that challenge our national security, too."

Dennis Ross, an adviser to Barack Obama, said Nephew's "viewpoints and conclusions are highly valuable, and can help many policy makers, too".

== Failure of US sanctions strategy against Iran ==
Richard Nephew writes in this book about the failure of the US sanctions strategy against Iran: Americans after the imposition of active sanctions (between years 1996 - 2004) found that in addition to oil and gas, industries such as petrochemicals, automobiles and consumer goods were most affected by the sanctions. Accordingly, sanctions were imposed on Iran's petrochemical sector during the year 2010, including the import of gasoline to Iran, but the strategy failed soon, because the Iranians began to optimize fuel consumption, which led to reduced consumption. Also they increased fuel production (gasoline and diesel) in their refineries. By this way they succeed in circumventing the petrochemical and gas boycott strategy.

== Significant ==
=== Consequences of the imposition of sanctions on crude oil exports in years 2012 and 2013 ===
The author believes that these sanctions have led to the development of Iran's non-oil sectors, particularly the cement sector. Thus, the government was immune from some of the effects of the oil sanctions, as the government tried to find new opportunities in the market for its unauthorized products. In fact, Iran was able to increase its presence and its non-oil goods directly in these markets through sanctions, which limited the country's ability to export one commodity, leading to Iran's ability to expand into other commodities. So here, beyond demonstrating perseverance, Iran has also been able to get through the sanctions.

=== Psychological war on sanctions ===
Richard Nephew points out in the book that the psychological warfare of sanctions has had more impact on sanctions than on the implementation and enforcement of sanctions. Somewhere in the book, he says, the psychological war on Iran, in addition to playing a key role in advancing American action, is aimed at making wrong decisions by Iranian statesmen in addition to creating despair and frustration among the Iran's people.

== See also ==
- America Against the World
- Seeds of Destruction
- The Hell of Good Intentions
