= Kim Yi Dionne =

American political scientist (born 1977)

- Born: 1977 (age 48–49); Castle Air Force Base, California, U.S.
- Education: University of California, Los Angeles
- Scientific career
- Fields: Political science
- Workplaces: Texas A&M University; Smith College; University of California, Riverside
- Doctoral advisor: Daniel N. Posner

Kim Yi Dionne (born 1977) is an American political scientist specializing in politics and public opinion in African countries. She is an associate professor at the University of California, Riverside. Her book Doomed Interventions examines why HIV/AIDS interventions on the African continent have failed to lower transmission rates despite being among the most richly funded human welfare efforts in history. Dionne was also a senior editor at The Monkey Cage, a political science and current events blog at The Washington Post, and serves on the advisory board of Women Also Know Stuff, which promotes the expertise of women in political science.

== Early life and education ==
Dionne was born in 1977 on the Castle Air Force Base. Her mother, Chong Hui Kim Shimakawa, was from a rural village in Korea. She earned a B.A. in political science and international relations (1999), M.A. (2007) and Ph.D. (2010) in political science from the University of California, Los Angeles, where she was a FLAS fellow in Kiswahili/African Studies. From 1999 to 2003, she was an associate director of M.B.A. admissions for the UCLA Anderson School of Management. She was a Fulbright scholar at the Chancellor College, University of Malawi from 2008 to 2009. Her dissertation was titled, The Political Economy of HIV/AIDS Intervention in Sub-Saharan Africa. Daniel N. Posner was her doctoral advisor.

== Career ==
=== Research ===
Dionne researches health interventions, politics, and public opinion in African countries. Her book, Doomed Interventions: The Failure of Global Responses to AIDS in Africa, was published in 2018 by Cambridge University Press. In seven chapters, organized thematically, Dionne argues that efforts to fight AIDS failed despite historic financing because of failure of coordination among the many actors involved. Noting conspicuous failures of efforts in Botswana and Mozambique, Dionne undertook an examination of aid implementation practices on the ground in Malawi to illuminate the challenges. She observed the vast distance between the funders who set policy (international aid accounts for 99% of the HIV/AIDS response in Malawi) and the people on the ground, both those tasked with putting these policies into place and those the policies target. This situation is ripe for mismanagement and corruption, as well as misunderstanding the priorities of those affected. Dionne shows that recipients of this aid often see HIV as just one of many health problems that affect their communities and thus have different goals for the resources. The cumulative effect, Dionne argues, of all these points of disconnects is that it is very difficult—"doomed"—to try to line up all that is necessary to succeed in preventing HIV transmission.

In 2020, Dionne and co-authors won the Western Political Science Association award for best article published by its journal Politics, Groups, and Identities. The article, published during the COVID-19 pandemic, was called "Ebola, elections, and immigration: how politicizing an epidemic can shape public attitudes." Dionne has also discussed events like the 1882 Chinese Exclusion Act in the context of stereotypes that Chinese migrants were more likely to carry diseases like cholera, then sometimes called the Asiatic flu.

=== Teaching ===
From 2010 to 2013, Dionne was an assistant professor of political science and affiliated faculty in Africana studies at Texas A&M University. She was a Five College Assistant Professor of Government at Smith College from 2013 to 2018. In 2018, she joined University of California, Riverside as an assistant professor and was promoted to associate professor and tenured in 2020.

=== Public scholarship ===
Dionne was a senior editor of The Washington Post political science blog, The Monkey Cage. Originally an independent blog, The Monkey Cage (TMC) became a part of the Post in 2013 and Dionne joined shortly thereafter. In her capacity at TMC, Dionne wrote as well as edited and mentored other political scientists on how to "translate" their academic work into writing for a popular audience.

Dionne also started Ufahamu Africa, a podcast about life and politics on the continent, co-hosted by Rachel Beatty Riedl. The show is organized around a weekly interview and supported by Northwestern University.

Dionne is on the advisory board of Women Also Know Stuff (WAKS). The project developed a database of women in political science and their specific fields of expertise, then used social media to draw the attention of journalists looking for experts to interview. The project also encourages those within the profession to check their syllabi, research paper references and other materials and use the database to redress implicit bias. For her role in the project, Dionne shared the 2016 Jane Mansbridge Award from the National Women's Caucus for Political Science, honoring those working for public accountability for gender equality and inclusion in political science and beyond the profession.

== Personal life ==
Dionne has two children.

== Selected works ==
- Dionne, Kim Yi (2018). Doomed Interventions: The Failure of Global Responses to AIDS in Africa. Cambridge University Press. ISBN 978-1-107-19559-2.
