= Electoral Calculus =

British political consultancy

Electoral Calculus Ltd.
- Type: Private limited company
- Industry: Market research Opinion polling Political consulting
- Founded: 2016
- Founders: Martin Baxter
- Headquarters: London, England, UK
- Area served: United Kingdom
- Website: electoralcalculus.co.uk

Electoral Calculus is a political consultancy and pollster, known for its political forecasting website that attempts to predict future United Kingdom general election results. It uses MRP (Multi-level Regression and Post-stratification) to combine national factors and local demographics.

== Main features ==
Electoral Calculus was founded and is run by Martin Baxter, who is a former financial analyst specialising in mathematical modelling. The Electoral Calculus website includes election data, predictions and analysis. It has separate sections for elections in Scotland and in Northern Ireland.

== Methodology ==
The election predictions are based around the employment of scientific techniques on data about the United Kingdom's electoral geography. Up to 2017, it used a modified uniform national swing, and it took account of national polls and trends but excluded local issues.

Since 2019, they have used MRP (Multi-Level Regression and Post-Stratification) methods to make their election predictions. Their model uses demographic, past voting behaviour and geographic data to estimate predicted vote shares on a seat-by-seat basis. The models are explained in detail on the web site.

== Predictions ==
Across the 12 general elections from 1992 to 2024, the site correctly predicted the party to win the most seats in all but one (1992). They also correctly predicted the outcome, that is, the party winning a majority or a hung parliament, in eight elections (majorities in 1997, 2001, 2005, 2015, 2017 (by a majority of only 3), 2019, 2024; hung parliament for 2010).

== Reception ==
In 2004, the site was listed by The Guardian as one of the "100 most useful websites", being "the best" for predictions. With reference to the 2010 United Kingdom general election, it was cited by journalists Andrew Rawnsley and Michael White of The Guardian. John Rentoul of The Independent referred to the site after the election.
