= Mortara Center for International Studies =

Academic research center in Washington D.C., U.S.

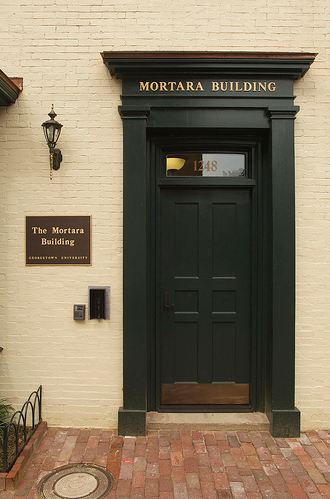
- The entrance to the Mortara Building at 3600 N Street, NW in Washington, DC.
- Type: Research institute
- Established: 2003
- Parent institution: Georgetown University
- Location: Washington, D.C. 38°54′23.6″N 77°4′13.8″W
- Website: mortara.georgetown.edu

The Mortara Center for International Studies is an academic research center at Georgetown University in Washington, D.C. As part of Georgetown's Edmund A. Walsh School of Foreign Service, the Mortara Center organizes and co-sponsors lectures, seminars, and conferences and provides support for research and publications on international affairs. The Mortara Center was established through a gift from the Michael and Virginia Mortara Foundation.

== History ==
The Mortara Center for International Studies was established in 2003 with a gift from the Michael and Virginia Mortara Foundation. At the time of his death in November 2000, Mr. Mortara was president and chief executive officer of Goldman Sachs Ventures. As an alumnus, Mortara served on the university's Board of Directors, recruited Georgetown students to Goldman Sachs, and encouraged the firm to support a variety of projects on campus. Virginia Mortara also has served as a past member of the Georgetown Board of Directors and Board of Regents. She currently sits on the School of Foreign Service Visiting Board. The Mortaras' elder son is a graduate of the School of Foreign Service class of 2004, and their younger son is a graduate of the class of 2009.

== Building ==
The Mortara Center is located at 3600 N Street NW. Opened in September 2005, the building features a conference room with audio-visual technology (including VTC) utilized for classes and events, office facilities for School of Foreign Service faculty, and Georgetown's Center for Security Studies.

== Mission ==
The stated mission of the Mortara Center:

The Mortara Center for International Studies seeks to advance scholarship and inform policy by combining the expertise of scholars and the experience of international affairs practitioners to illuminate the fundamental forces — political, economic, and cultural — that shape international relations. To realize this mission, the Center organizes and co-sponsors lectures, seminars, and conferences and provides support for research and publications.

== People ==
Former directors include: Kathleen R. McNamara, John McNeill, Carol Lancaster, Charles Kupchan, John Ikenberry, Abraham L. Newman.

As of February 2024, Erik Voeten is director of the center.

As of 2020 Madeleine Albright, former United States Secretary of State, is the Michael and Virginia Mortara Distinguished Professor in the Practice of Diplomacy.

== Lepgold Book Prize ==
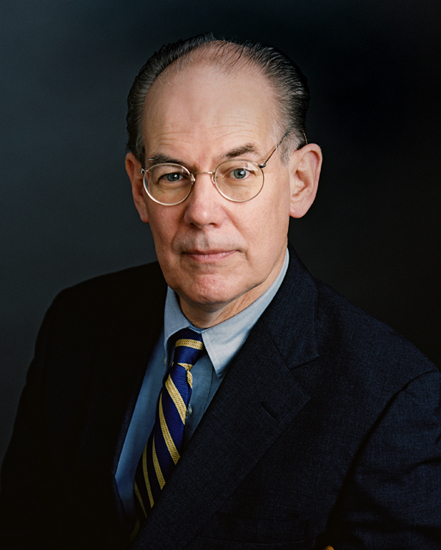
John Mearsheimer won the Lepgold Book Prize in 2001 for his book The Tragedy of Great Power Politics.

The Mortara Center oversees the annual Georgetown University Lepgold Book Prize. The prize was created in honor of Joseph S. Lepgold, a Georgetown University Government and School of Foreign Service professor who died in December 2001. The $1,000 prize honors exceptional contributions to the study of international relations, with specific emphasis on the resolution of critical policy challenges. The winning author gives a lecture at the Mortara Center on his or her scholarship.

=== Past winners ===
Past winners of the Lepgold Book Prize include:

- 2023: Pawned States: State Building in the Era of International Finance, by Didac Queralt
- 2022: Disregarding China, Inc.: State Strategies in the Liberal Economic Order, by Yeling Tan
- 2020: Divided Armies: Inequality & Battlefield Performance in Modern War, by Jason Lyall
- 2019: Constructing Allied Cooperation: Diplomacy, Payments, and Power in Multilateral Military Coalitions, by Marina E Henke and Arguing about Alliances: The Art of Agreement in Military-Pact Negotiations, by Paul Poast
- 2018: Secret Wars: Covert Conflict In International Politics, by Austin Carson
- 2017: Fighting for Status: Hierarchy and Conflict in World Politics, by Jonathan Renshon
- 2016: Violence and Restraint in Civil War: Civilian Targeting in the Shadow of International Law, by Jessica A. Stanton
- 2015: Making and Unmaking Nations: War, Leadership and Genocide in Modern Africa, by Scott Straus
- 2014: Networks of Rebellion: Explaining Insurgent Cohesion and Collapse, by Paul Staniland
- 2013: The Company States Keep, by Julia Gray
- 2012: Alliance Formation in Civil Wars, by Fotini Christia
- 2011: Leaders and International Conflict, by Giacomo Chiozza and H. E. Goemans
- 2010: The Clash of Ideas in World Politics, by John Owen
- 2009: The Invisible Hand of Peace, by Patrick J. McDonald
- 2008: Targeting Civilians in War, by Alexander Downes
- 2007: The Nuclear Taboo, by Nina Tannenwald
- 2006: Dangerous Nation, by Robert Kagan
- 2005: The Remnants of War, by John Mueller
- 2004: Electing to Fight, by Edward D. Mansfield and Jack Snyder
- 2003: Power and Purpose: U.S. Policy Toward Russia After the Cold War, by James Goldgeier and Michael McFaul
- 2002: A Problem from Hell: America and the Age of Genocide, by Samantha Power
- 2001: The Tragedy of Great Power Politics, by John J. Mearsheimer

== Events ==
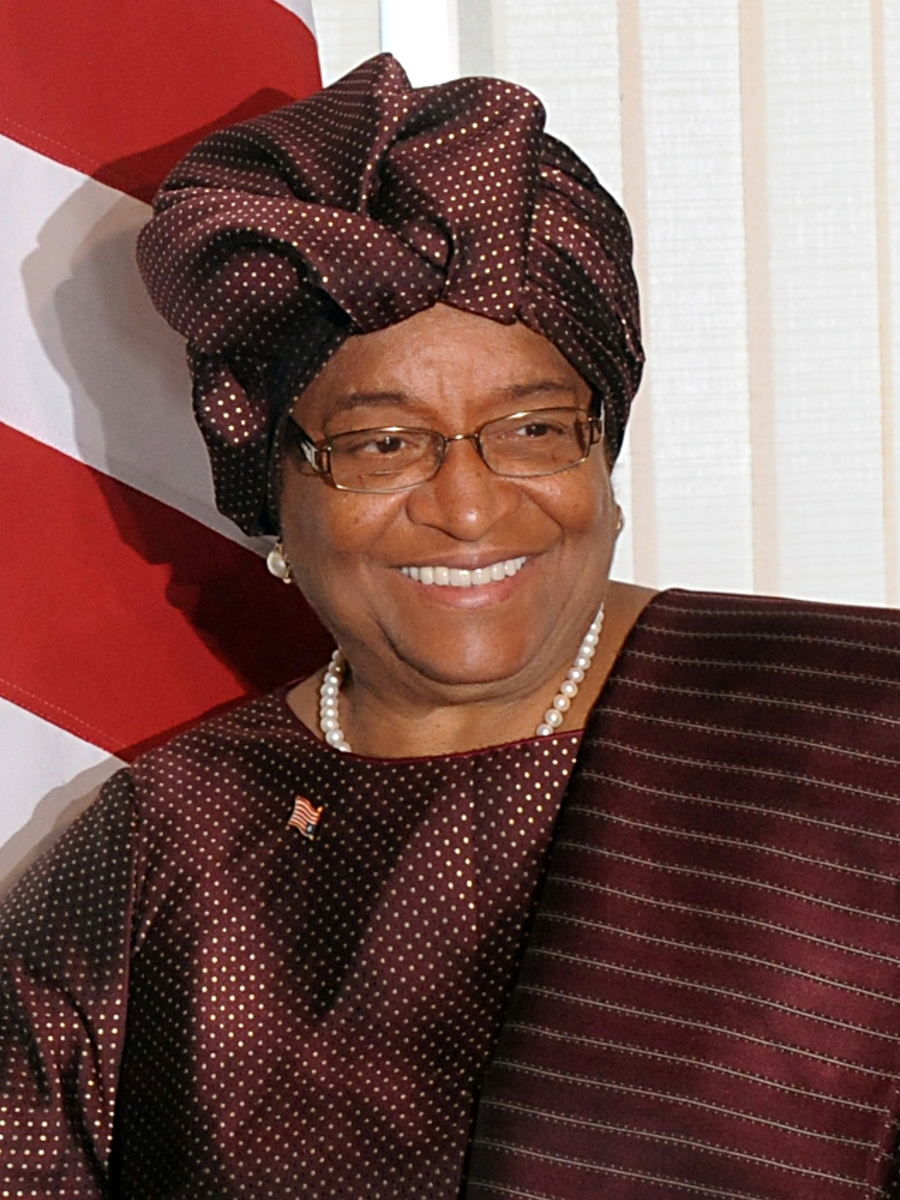
President of Liberia Ellen Johnson-Sirleaf gave the Goldman Sachs Distinguished Lecture in 2006.

=== Goldman Sachs Distinguished Lecture Series ===
The Goldman Sachs Distinguished Lecture features an internationally recognized scholar or government official speaking on an international issue of public concern. Past speakers have included Lawrence Summers, Samuel P. Huntington, John Ruggie, Robert Rubin, Ellen Johnson-Sirleaf, and Russell Feingold.

=== Modern International History Lectures ===
The Modern International History Lecture features a contemporary historian who presents on an aspect of recent history related to international relations. The inaugural lecture was given by Yale University's John Lewis Gaddis in 2006. Past lecturers include Paul Kennedy, Niall Ferguson, and Margaret MacMillan.

=== Illuminati Dinner Series ===
The Illuminati Dinner Series at the Mortara Center is a formal dinner series where students converse with Georgetown's distinguished visiting scholars and faculty practitioners.

== Research ==
=== Mortara Undergraduate Research Fellows ===
The Mortara Undergraduate Research Fellows (MURFS) Program partners a select group of School of Foreign Service students with professors to collaborate on research projects on contemporary international relations issues throughout their undergraduate career.

=== Research seminars ===
Mortara's research seminars unite faculty and students to discuss new research in academic disciplines of the School of Foreign Service. Research seminar sessions bring together Georgetown faculty, students, and invited scholars from various disciplines to share ideas, critique working papers, and collaborate on research. These meetings are made possible through partnerships with the Departments of History, Government and the Georgetown Public Policy Institute. The current research seminar groups include:

- International Political Economy Working Group
- Georgetown University International Theory and Research Seminar (GUITARS)
- Current Research on Issues and Topics in Comparative Scholarship (CRITICS)
- Energy and Climate
- International History Seminar

=== Global Political Economy Project ===
Funded by a grant from the Open Society Foundation, the Global Political Economy Project aims to spur research on how the globalization of markets affects all aspects of people's lives and how the power of globalization can be used as a force for good in the world.
