= John Sides =

John Sides may refer to:

- John H. Sides (1904–1978), American admiral
- John M. Sides, American political scientist
- John Sides, member of the 1967 Alabama Crimson Tide football team
