= UNS =

UNS or Uns can mean:

- German Word for "us"
- Unified National Special, part of the Unified Thread Standard
- Unnilseptium (Uns), temporary name of chemical element 107, bohrium (Bh)
- Unified numbering system, used to identify alloys
- Uniform national swing, a system for predicting parliamentary seats
- Universal Numbering System, a dental notation system
- Unión Nacional Sinarquista, a Mexican political movement
- National University of the South, Argentina
- University of Novi Sad, Serbia
- Sebelas Maret University (Universitas Negeri Sebelas Maret), Surakarta, Indonesia
- Uns, a 1983 album by Brazilian singer Caetano Veloso
- Ustaška nadzorna služba, political police in the Independent State of Croatia
