= Martin Walt =

Martin Walt (1926–2021) was a professor of electrical engineering at Stanford University. He specialized in magnetospheric physics. He was also the father of Stephen Walt, a professor at Harvard University's John F. Kennedy School of Government.

== Education ==
He received his B.S. (Physics) from California Institute of Technology (1950), his M.S. (Physics) from University of Wisconsin–Madison (1951) and his Ph.D. (Physics), University of Wisconsin–Madison (1953). His graduate education was in experimental nuclear physics.

== Career ==
He worked for 1953–1956 at Los Alamos Scientific Laboratory. From 1956 to 1992 he worked for the Research laboratory of the Lockheed Missiles and Space Company. In 1993 he began teaching at Stanford University.

== Honors and awards ==
He received the Wisconsin Alumni Research Foundation Fellowship in 1951 and Atomic Energy Commission Fellowship for 1952–1953. He was a Fellow of the American Physical Society and the American Geophysical Union.
