= Stephen Walt =

American political scientist (born 1955)

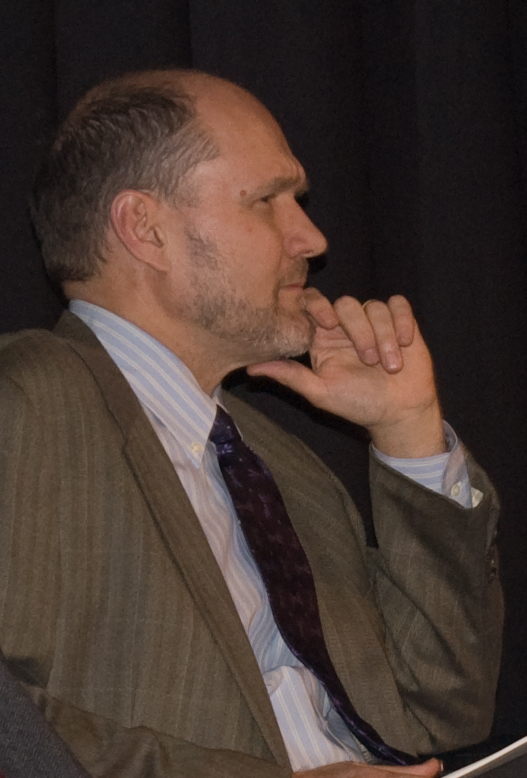
- Walt in 2007
- Born: Stephen Martin Walt; July 2, 1955 (age 71); Los Alamos, New Mexico, United States

Education
- Education: Stanford University (BA); University of California, Berkeley (MA, PhD)

Philosophical work
- School: Neorealism
- Institutions: Harvard Kennedy School; University of Chicago; Princeton University
- Doctoral students: Fotini Christia
- Main interests: International relations theory
- Notable ideas: Balance of threat

Stephen Martin Walt (born July 2, 1955) is an American political scientist serving as the Robert and Renee Belfer Professor of international relations at the Harvard Kennedy School.

A member of the realist school of international relations, Walt has made important contributions to the theory of neorealism and authored the balance-of-threat theory.

Books that he has authored or coauthored include Origins of Alliances, Revolution and War, and The Israel Lobby and U.S. Foreign Policy.

== Early life and education ==
Walt was born in Los Alamos, New Mexico, where his father, Martin Walt, a physicist, worked at the Los Alamos National Laboratory. His mother was a school teacher. The family moved to the San Francisco Bay Area when Stephen was about eight months old, and he grew up in Los Altos Hills.

Walt pursued his undergraduate studies at Stanford University. He first majored in chemistry, as he was planning to become a biochemist, but he then shifted to history and finally to international relations. After earning his BA, Walt began graduate work at the University of California, Berkeley, graduating with an MA in political science in 1978, and a PhD in political science in 1983.

== Career ==
Walt taught at Princeton University and the University of Chicago, where he served as master of the Social Science Collegiate Division and deputy dean of social sciences. As of 2015, he holds the Robert and Renee Belfer Professorship in International Affairs at the Harvard Kennedy School.

=== Other professional activities ===
Walt served on the board of directors of the Bulletin of the Atomic Scientists from 1992 to 2001. He was elected a fellow of the American Academy of Arts and Sciences in May 2005.

Walt is frequently invited to speak about foreign policy issues at universities. He spoke at the Saltzman Institute of War and Peace Studies at Columbia University in 2010. In 2012, Walt took part in a panel during the "one-state solution" conference on Israel and Palestine at the Kennedy School, along with Ali Abunimah and Eve Spangler. Walt delivered the Harrington Lecture at Clark University in April 2013, as well as the 2013 F. H. Hinsley Lecture at Cambridge University. On December 20, 2013, he gave a talk at the College of William & Mary entitled, "Why US Foreign Policy Keeps Failing".

== Views ==
=== American power and culture ===
On the twentieth anniversary of the war against Iraq, Walt characterized the rules-based world order as "a set of rules that we [the US] had an enormous role in writing, and of course which we feel free to violate whenever it's inconvenient for us to follow them." In the comprehensive 2005 article "Taming American Power", Walt argued that the US should "make its dominant position acceptable to others—by using military force sparingly, by fostering greater cooperation with key allies, and, most important of all, by rebuilding its crumbling international image." He proposed for the US to "resume its traditional role as an 'offshore balancer'", to intervene "only when absolutely necessary", and to keep "its military presence as small as possible." In a late 2011 article for The National Interest, "The End of the American Era", Walt wrote that the US was losing its position of world dominance.

Walt gave a speech in 2013 to the Norwegian Institute for Defence Studies, "Why does US foreign policy keep failing?" The institute later described him as seeing "an overwhelming bias among US foreign policy institutions toward an activist foreign policy" and "a propensity to exaggerate threats, noting the chances of being struck by lightning have been far greater since 2001 than death by terrorist attack." He also characterized the US as lacking "diplomatic skill and finesse" and advised Europeans "to think of themselves and not rely on the US for guidance or advice on solving their security issues." Ultimately, he argued that "the United States is simply not skilled enough to run the world."

In 2013, Walt asked "Why are Americans so willing to pay taxes in order to support a world-girdling national security establishment, yet so reluctant to pay taxes to have better schools, health care, roads, bridges, subways, parks, museums, libraries, and all the other trappings of a wealthy and successful society?" He said that the question was especially puzzling given that "the United States is the most secure power in history and will remain remarkably secure unless it keeps repeating the errors of the past decade or so."

=== Foreign policy ===
A critic of military interventionism, Walt stated:

Hawks like to portray opponents of military intervention as "isolationist" because they know it is a discredited political label. Yet there is a coherent case for a more detached and selective approach to U.S. grand strategy, and one reason that our foreign policy establishment works so hard to discredit it is their suspicion that a lot of Americans might find it convincing if they weren't constantly being reminded about looming foreign dangers in faraway places. The arguments in favor of a more restrained grand strategy are far from silly, and the approach makes a lot more sense than neoconservatives' fantasies of global primacy or liberal hawks' fondness for endless quasi-humanitarian efforts to reform whole regions.

=== Europe ===
In 1998, Walt wrote that "deep structural forces" were "beginning to pull Europe and America apart". Walt argued that NATO must be sustained because of four major areas in which close co-operation is beneficial to European and American interest.

1. Defeating international terrorism; Walt saw a need for cooperation between Europe and the United States in managing terrorist networks and stopping the flow of money to terror cells.
2. Limiting the spread of weapons of mass destruction; Walt argued that anti-proliferation efforts are most successful when Europe and the US work in concert to bring loose nuclear material into responsible custody. He cited the case of Libya's willingness to abandon its nascent fission program after being pressured multilaterally as evidence of this.
3. Managing the world economy; lowering barriers to trade and investment particularly between the US and the EU would accelerate economic growth. Notable differences in trade policy stem mainly in areas of agricultural policy.
4. Dealing with failed states; failed states are breeding grounds for anti-Western movements. Managing failed states such as Afghanistan, Bosnia and Somalia require a multinational response since the US has insufficient wealth to modernise and rebuild these alone. In this area, European allies are especially desirable because they have more experience with peacekeeping and "nation-building".

=== Eastern Europe and Russia ===
In 2015, a year after Russia invaded Crimea, Walt wrote that extending invitations for NATO membership to countries in the former Soviet Bloc is a "dangerous and unnecessary goal" and that Ukraine ought to be a "neutral buffer state in perpetuity." He further argued that, although Obama had refrained from arming Ukraine, doing so would be "a recipe for a longer and more destructive conflict". The Obama administration avoided arming Ukraine for the duration of its term, in keeping with Walt's strategy, but the first Trump administration angered Russia by approving a plan to provide anti-tank missiles in 2017.

In 2023, after the full-scale invasion of Ukraine by Russia, Walt condemned Russia's actions as illegal, but called the morality of the war "murky" in an article for Foreign Policy. Taking a similar stance to that of his co-author John Mearsheimer, Walt has called for an end to military aid to Ukraine and claimed that NATO expansion is partially at fault for the conflict. In 2025, in an interview on NPR's Morning Edition, Walt criticized the second Trump administration's handling of the war, stating that Ukraine's sovereignty and security should be ensured in any negotiated settlement.

=== Middle East ===
Walt said in December 2012 that America's "best course in the Middle East would be to act as an 'offshore balancer': ready to intervene if the balance of power is upset, but otherwise keeping our military footprint small. We should also have normal relationship with states like Israel and Saudi Arabia, instead of the counterproductive 'special relationships' we have today." An article by Walt entitled "What Should We Do if the Islamic State Wins? Live with it." appeared on June 10, 2015, in Foreign Policy magazine. He explained his view that the Islamic State was unlikely to grow into a longlasting world power on Point of Inquiry, the podcast of the Center for Inquiry in July 2015.

=== Israel ===
Walt has been a critic, along with his co-author John Mearsheimer of the offensive neorealism school of international relations, of the Israel lobby in the United States and the influence he says that it has on its foreign policy. He wrote that Barack Obama erred by breaking with the principles in his Cairo speech by allowing continued Israeli settlement and by participating in a "well-coordinated assault" against the Goldstone Report.

Walt suggested in 2010 that State Department diplomat Dennis Ross's alleged partiality toward Israel might make him give Obama advice that was against US interests. Robert Satloff, executive director of the Washington Institute for Near East Policy (WINEP), defended Ross and criticized Walt in a piece published by Foreign Affairs, which had published Walt's piece a few days earlier. Satloff wrote that Ross's connection to WINEP is innocuous (Ross was a distinguished fellow at WINEP throughout George W. Bush's administration, and Mearsheimer and Walt's book described WINEP as "part of the core" of the Israel lobby in the United States) and that Walt mistakenly believes that the US cannot simultaneously "advance strategic partnership both with Israel and with friendly Arab and Muslim states."

After the Itamar attack, in which a Jewish family was killed on the West Bank in March 2011, Walt condemned the murderers and added that "while we are at it, we should not spare the other parties who have helped create and perpetuate the circumstances." He listed "every Israeli government since 1967, for actively promoting the illegal effort to colonize these lands," "Palestinian leaders who have glorified violence," and "the settlers themselves, some of whom routinely use violence to intimidate the Palestinians who live in the lands they covet."

Walt criticized the US for voting against a Security Council resolution condemning Israel's West Bank settlements, calling the vote a "foolish step" because "the resolution was in fact consistent with the official policy of every president since Lyndon Johnson."

=== Iran ===
Walt has frequently criticized America's policy with respect to Iran. In 2011, Walt told an interviewer that the American reaction to an alleged Iranian plot to assassinate the Saudi ambassador in the United States "might be part of a larger American diplomatic effort to put Iran on the hot seat." In December 2012, Walt wrote, "Washington continues to insist on a near-total Iranian capitulation. And because Iran has been effectively demonized here in America, it would be very hard for President Obama to reach a compromise and then sell it back home."

Walt said in November 2013, "Americans often forget just how secure the United States is, especially compared with other states," thanks to its power, resources, and geography, and thus "routinely blows minor threats out of all proportion. I mean: Iran has a defense budget of about $10 billion... yet we manage to convince ourselves that Iran is a Very Serious Threat to US vital interests. Ditto the constant fretting about minor-league powers like Syria, North Korea, Muammar al-Qaddafi's Libya, and other so-called 'rogue states.'" Therefore, whatever happens in the Middle East, "the United States can almost certainly adjust and adapt and be just fine."

=== Libya ===
After visiting Libya, Walt wrote in Foreign Policy in January 2010 that while "Libya is far from a democracy, it also doesn't feel like other police states that I have visited. I caught no whiff of an omnipresent security service—which is not to say that they aren't there. … The Libyans with whom I spoke were open and candid and gave no sign of being worried about being overheard or reported or anything like that. … I tried visiting various political websites from my hotel room and had no problems, although other human rights groups report that Libya does engage in selective filtering of some political websites critical of the regime. It is also a crime to criticize Qaddafi himself, the government's past human rights record is disturbing at best, and the press in Libya is almost entirely government-controlled. Nonetheless, Libya appears to be more open than contemporary Iran or China and the overall atmosphere seemed far less oppressive than most places I visited in the old Warsaw Pact."

David E. Bernstein, Foundation Professor at the George Mason University School of Law, criticized Walt in 2011 for accepting funding from the Libyan government for a trip to Libya in which he addressed that country's Economic Development Board and then wrote what Bernstein called "a puff piece" about his visit. Bernstein said it was ironic that "Walt, after fulminating about the American domestic 'Israel Lobby'" had thus become "a part of the 'Libya lobby.'" Bernstein also found it ironic that "Walt, a leading critic of the friendship the US and Israel, concludes his piece with the hope 'that the United States and Libya continue to nurture and build a constructive relationship.' Because, you know, Israel is so much nastier than Qaddafi's Libya."

Under the headline "Is Stephen Walt Blind, a Complete Fool, or a Big Liar?", Martin Peretz of The New Republic mocked Walt for praising Libya, which Peretz called a "murderous place" and for viewing its dictator as "civilized." Peretz contrasted Walt's view of Libya, which, Peretz noted, he had visited for less than a day.

=== Syria ===
In August 2013, Walt argued that even if it turned out that Bashar al-Assad of Syria had used chemical weapons, the US should not intervene. "Dead is dead, no matter how it is done," wrote Walt. "Obama may be tempted to strike because he foolishly drew a 'red line' over this issue and feels his credibility is now at stake. But following one foolish step with another will not restore that lost standing."

=== China ===
Walt posits that offshore balancing is the most desirable strategy to deal with China. In 2011, Walt argued that China will seek to gain regional hegemony and a broad sphere of influence in Asia, which was comparable in size to the US position in the Western Hemisphere. If that happens, he predicts that China would be secure enough on the mainland to give added attention to shaping events to its favour in far flung areas. Since China is resource-poor, it will likely aim to safeguard vital sea lanes in areas such as the Persian Gulf. In a December 2012 interview, Walt said that "the United States does not help its own cause by exaggerating Chinese power. We should not base our policy today on what China might become twenty or thirty years down the road."

=== Balance of threat theory ===
Walt developed the balance of threat theory, which defined threats in terms of aggregate power, geographic proximity, offensive power, and aggressive intentions. It is a modification of the "balance of power" theory, whose framework was refined by neorealist Kenneth Waltz.

=== Snowden case ===
In July 2013, Walt argued that Obama should give Edward Snowden an immediate pardon. "Mr. Snowden's motives," wrote Walt, "were laudable: he believed fellow citizens should know their government was conducting a secret surveillance programme enormous in scope, poorly supervised and possibly unconstitutional. He was right." History, Walt suggested, "will probably be kinder to Mr Snowden than to his pursuers, and his name may one day be linked to the other brave men and women—Daniel Ellsberg, Martin Luther King Jr., Mark Felt, Karen Silkwood and so on—whose acts of principled defiance are now widely admired."

== Books ==
In his 1987 book The Origins of Alliances, Walt examines the ways in which alliances are made and "proposes a fundamental change in the present conceptions of alliance systems." Revolution and War (1996) exposes "the flaws in existing theories about the relationship between revolution and war" by studying in detail the French, Russian, and Iranian Revolutions and providing briefer views of the American, Mexican, Turkish, and Chinese Revolutions. Taming American Power (2005) provides a thorough critique of US strategy from the perspective of its adversaries. Anatol Lieven called it "a brilliant contribution to the American foreign policy debate." The Hell of Good Intentions: America's Foreign Policy Elite and the Decline of U.S. Primacy was published on 16 October 2018.

=== The Israel Lobby and U.S. Foreign Policy ===
In March 2006, John Mearsheimer and Walt, then academic dean of the Harvard Kennedy School, published a working paper, "The Israel Lobby and U.S. Foreign Policy", as well as an article entitled "The Israel Lobby" in the London Review of Books, on the negative effects of "the unmatched power of the Israel Lobby". They defined the Israel lobby as "the loose coalition of individuals and organizations who actively work to steer US foreign policy in a pro-Israel direction". Mearsheimer and Walt took this position, "What the Israel lobby wants, it too often gets." The book contends that the US-Israel alliance skews US foreign policy in Israel's favor, often at the expense of regional stability in the Middle East.

The articles, as well as the bestselling book that Walt and Mearsheimer later developed, generated considerable media coverage throughout the world. Contending that Walt and Mearsheimer are members of a "school that essentially wishes that the war with jihadism had never started", Christopher Hitchens concluded that "wishfulness has led them to seriously mischaracterize the origins of the problem." Former US ambassador Edward Peck wrote that the "tsunami" of responses condemning the report proved the existence of the lobby and "Opinions differ on the long-term costs and benefits for both nations, but the lobby's views of Israel's interests have become the basis of US Middle East policies."

Walt stepped down as academic dean of the Kennedy School in June 2006; while the university maintained this decision was unrelated to the controversy, leaked emails later revealed that Jeffrey Epstein and Alan Dershowitz had coordinated a campaign to discredit the authors, coinciding with pressure from university donors regarding Walt's use of his endowed title.

== Personal life ==
Walt is married to Rebecca E. Stone, who ran for a seat in the Massachusetts House of Representatives in the 2018 election. Stone is Jewish. They have two adult children.

== Titles and positions ==
- 1999–present – Belfer Professor of International Affairs, Harvard Kennedy School, Harvard University
- 2002–2006 – academic dean, Harvard Kennedy School, Harvard University
- January 2000 – visiting professor of strategic studies, Institute for Defense and Security Studies, Nanyang Technological University, Singapore
- 1996–1999 – University of Chicago, deputy dean of social sciences
- 1995–1999 – University of Chicago, professor
- 1992–2001 – Bulletin of the Atomic Scientists, board of directors
- 1989–1995 – University of Chicago, associate professor
- 1988 – The Brookings Institution, guest scholar
- 1986–1987 – Carnegie Endowment for International Peace, resident associate
- 1985–1989 – World Politics, Board of Editors
- 1984–1989 – Princeton University, Woodrow Wilson School, assistant professor
- 1981–1984 – Harvard University, Center for Science and International Affairs, research fellow
- 1978–1982 – Center for Naval Analyses, staff
