= Yeling Tan =

American political scientist

- Citizenship: American
- Education: Stanford University (BA), Harvard University (MPA, PhD)
- Occupations: Political scientist, China specialist
- Employer: University of Oxford
- Awards: Peter Katzenstein Book Prize (2021), Lepgold Book Prize (2022)
- Website: http://www.yelingtan.net

Yeling Tan is an American political scientist. She is currently a professor of public policy at the University of Oxford's Blavatnik School of Government and a non-resident senior fellow at the Peterson Institute for International Economics.

== Education ==
Tan holds a BA in international relations and economics from Stanford University, an MPA in international development, and a PhD in public policy from Harvard University.

== Career ==
Prior to joining Oxford, Tan was an assistant professor of political science at the University of Oregon. She was a 2021-2023 Public Intellectual Fellow with the National Committee on US-China Relations.

== Awards ==
Tan received Georgetown University Mortara Center for International Studies' Lepgold Book Prize in 2022 and Cornell University's Peter Katzenstein Book Prize in 2021 for her book, Disaggregating China, Inc. In 2021, Tan was also awarded University of Pennsylvania Perry World House and Foreign Affairs' joint Emerging Scholars Global Policy Prize.

== Publications ==
=== Books ===
- Disaggregating China, Inc., Cornell University Press, 2021

=== Articles ===
- How the WTO Changed China, Foreign Affairs, February 16, 2021
