= Robert Bates (political scientist) =

American political scientist

Robert H. Bates
- Born: 1942 (age 83–84)
- Education: Massachusetts Institute of Technology
- Scientific career
- Fields: Political science
- Workplaces: Harvard University
- Doctoral advisor: Myron Weiner
- Doctoral students: Fotini Christia

Robert Hinrichs Bates (born 1942) is an American political scientist specializing in comparative politics. He is Eaton Professor of the Science of Government in the Departments of Government and African and African American Studies at Harvard University. From 2000–2012, he served as Professeur associé, School of Economics, University of Toulouse.

An Africanist by training, Bates's research has been influential in comparative politics and the political economy of economic development. Bates has been a leading proponent of the use of rational choice theory and deductive methods in political science.

== Education and career ==
He was born in Brooklyn, New York, in 1942. His father was a country doctor. After graduating from Haverford College in 1964, Bates received his Ph.D. in Political Science at the Massachusetts Institute of Technology in 1969. He has also studied anthropology at Manchester University and the School of Oriental and African Studies and economics at Stanford University at the graduate level. He joined the faculty of the California Institute of Technology in 1969. From 1985 until 1993, he was Luce Professor of Political Economy at Duke University. He was elected a Fellow of the American Academy of Arts and Sciences in 1991 and to the National Academy of Sciences in 2016.

Bates's research focuses on the political economy of development, particularly in Africa. Starting with field work in the mining townships of the Copperbelt, he subsequently conducted field work in the Luapula Valley of Zambia. Expanding the scope of his research to include countries in Eastern and Western Africa as well, he addressed the politics of agricultural development and food supply just at the time that dearth and famine increasingly arose on the continent.

Under the auspices of the Africa Economic Research Consortium and the Harvard University, Bates returned to Africa twice yearly to contribute to a two-volume analysis of Africa's economic performance in the post independence period.

Bates has received grants from the National Science Foundation, the Social Science Research Council, and other sources; been a Carnegie Scholar, an Olin Fellow at the Graduate School of Business, Stanford University, and Moore Fellow at the California Institute of Technology; and received the Riker Prize from the University of Rochester's department of political science. He has served as Vice President of the American Political Science Association and President of its Comparative Politics Section and on the editorial board of book series with the California and Cambridge University Press. He has held fellowships at the Center for Advanced Study in the Behavioral Sciences and the Russell Sage Foundation and served as a consultant with the World Bank. He is a member of both the American Academy of Arts and Sciences and the National Academy of Sciences.

== Books and edited collections by Robert H. Bates ==
- Unions, Parties, and Political Development: A Study of Mineworkers in Zambia. New Haven: Yale University Press, 1971.
- Rural Responses to Industrialization: A Study of Village Zambia. New Haven: Yale University Press, 1976.
- Agricultural Development in Africa: Issues of Public Policy, co-editor Michael F. Lofchie. New York: Praeger Publishers, Special Studies on International Development, 1980.
- Markets and States in Tropical Africa: The Political Basis of Agricultural Policy. Berkeley: University of California Press, Series on Social Choice and Political Economy, 1981. Paperback edition, 1984. Second edition, 2005. Chinese edition, 2001.
- Essays on the Political Economy of Rural Africa. Cambridge: Cambridge University Press, 1983. Paperback edition, Berkeley: University of California Press, Series on Social Choice and Political Economy, 1987. Reprinted, Cambridge University Press, 2008.
- Toward A Political Economy of Development: A Rational Choice Perspective, editor and co-author. Berkeley: University of California Press, Series in Social Choice and Political Economy, 1988.
- Special issue of Politics and Society, edited with Margaret Levi, vol 16, nos. 2-3 (June–September 1988).
- Beyond the Miracle of the Market: The Political Economy of Agrarian Development in Kenya. Cambridge: Cambridge University Press, 1989. Paperback edition, 1992. Second edition, 2005. Chinese edition 2008.
- Political and Economic Interactions in Economic Policy Reform. Co-authored and co-edited with Anne O. Krueger. Oxford: Basil Blackwell, 1993.
- Africa and the Disciplines: The Contribution of African Studies to the Humanities and Social Sciences. Editor with Jean O'Barr and V. S. Mudimbe. Chicago: University of Chicago Press, 1993.
- Open Economy Politics: The Politics and Economics of the International Coffee Market. Princeton: Princeton University Press, 1997. One of Choice's Outstanding Academic Books of 1997. Spanish edition 2006.
- Analytic Narratives, with Avner Greif, Margaret Levi, Jean-Laurent Rosenthal, and Barry Weingast. Princeton: Princeton University Press, 1999. Chinese edition, 2008.
- Prosperity and Violence: The Political Economy of Development. New York: W. W. Norton & Company, 2001. Second edition in press.
- Co-author with Benno Ndulu et al. The Political Economy of Economic Growth in Africa, 1960-2000: An Analytic Survey. Cambridge: Cambridge University Press, 2007.
- Co-editor with Benno Ndulu et al. The Political Economy of Economic Growth in Africa, 1960-2000: Case Studies. Cambridge: Cambridge University Press, 2007.
- When Things Fell Apart: State Failure in Late-Century Africa. Cambridge: Cambridge University Press, 2008.
