= Varun Sivaram =

American physicist and political advisor

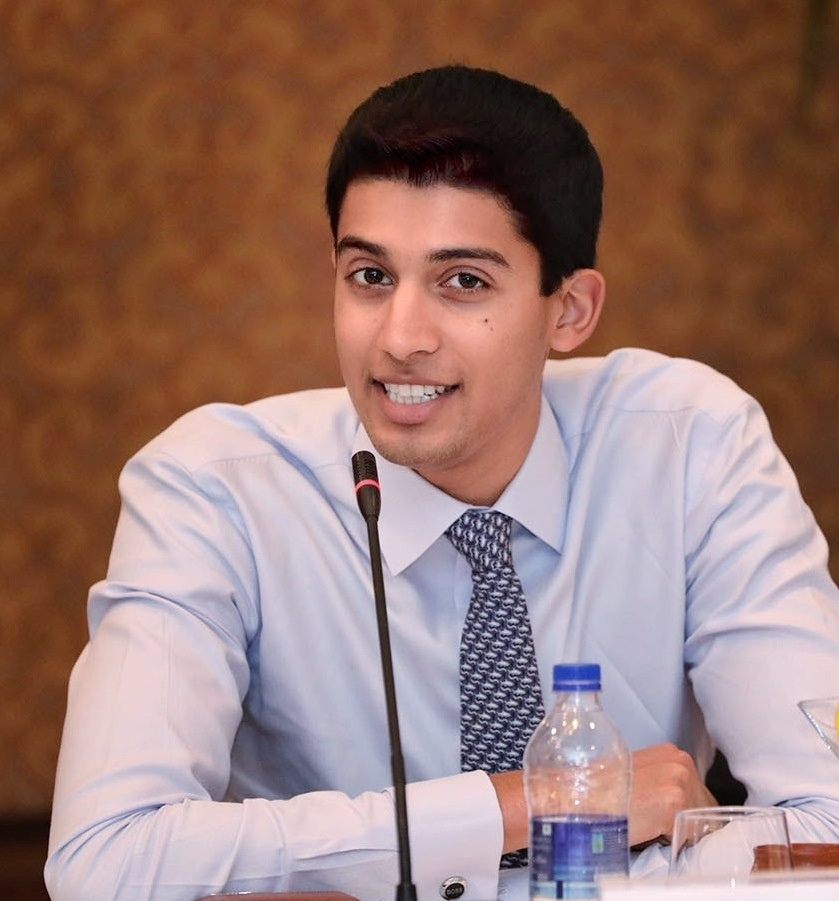
- Varun Sivaram in 2018
- Born: Varun Srinivasan Sivaram; 1989 (age 36–37)
- Citizenship: United States
- Education: Stanford University (BS, BA); University of Oxford (DPhil)
- Spouse: Laxmi Parthasarathy
- Awards: Rhodes Scholarship
- Scientific career
- Institutions: Ørsted; Biden administration ReNew Power; McKinsey & Company; Council on Foreign Relations
- Thesis: Simulation, synthesis, sunlight: enhancing electronic transport in solid-state dye-sensitized solar cells (2014)
- Doctoral advisor: Henry Snaith
- Website: varunsivaram.com

Varun Srinivasan Sivaram (born 1989) is an American former U.S. State Department policy advisor and clean energy entrepreneur.

He has previously worked in the U.S. State Department as an advisor to U.S. Special Presidential Envoy for Climate John Kerry, as the chief technology officer (CTO) of ReNew Power, India's largest renewable energy company, on the faculty of Columbia University, as the director of the energy and climate program at the Council on Foreign Relations (CFR), and as a senior energy advisor to the mayor of Los Angeles and governor of New York.

== Education ==
Sivaram graduated from Saratoga High School in Saratoga, California. Sivaram holds a B.S. in engineering physics and a B.A. in international relations from Stanford University, where he was inducted into Phi Beta Kappa and was awarded a Truman Scholarship. He also holds a DPhil in condensed matter physics from the University of Oxford, St. John's College, where he was a Rhodes Scholar. While at Oxford, his research investigated the use of perovskite solar cells and was supervised by Henry Snaith.

== Career and research ==
He is currently Group Senior Vice President and a member of the Group Executive Team at Ørsted.

He previously served in the State Department in the Biden Administration, as an advisor to the U.S. Special Presidential Envoy for Climate John Kerry, where he helped create the First Movers Coalition.

His policy experience also includes serving as senior energy advisor to Los Angeles Mayor Antonio R. Villaraigosa and New York Governor Andrew Cuomo.

In his academic career, he has served on the faculty of the Georgetown University School of Foreign Service and the Columbia University Center on Global Energy Policy.

In the private sector, he served as the Chief Technology Officer of ReNew Power, and was earlier a consultant for McKinsey & Co.

Sivaram is a World Economic Forum Young Global Leader and member of the Council on Foreign Relations. He has also served on the boards of the Stanford University Woods Institute for the Environment and Precourt Institute for Energy; as one of the 25 advisors to the UN COP26 climate conference in 2021, on the World Economic Forum's Global Future Council for the Energy Transition; as senior fellow at the Aspen Institute; and on the board of directors of Peridot Acquisition Corp. (NYSE:PDAC).

=== Books ===
Sivaram is the author of Taming the Sun: Innovations to Harness Solar Energy and Power the Planet, a book that explores the potential of solar energy.

Sivaram is also lead author of Energizing America: A Roadmap to Launch a National Energy Innovation Mission. Along with co-authors Colin Cunliff, David Hart, Julio Friedmann, and David Sandalow, Sivaram calls for the United States to triple federal funding for clean energy innovation to $25 billion by 2025 to speed global clean energy transitions and cultivate advanced U.S. energy industries that can compete in growing markets around the world. According to Bloomberg, "The book details down to the budget line item exactly how much money America should spend and how it should spend it."

Sivaram is the editor of Digital Decarbonization: Promoting Digital Innovations to Advance Clean Energy Systems. The volume brings together fourteen expert authors who lay out a wide range of areas in which digital technologies are promoting clean energy systems; caution about serious risks of digitalization to cybersecurity and privacy; and articulate actionable recommendations for policymakers in the United States and abroad to ensure that digital innovations help advance the fight against climate change.

=== Awards and recognition ===
Bill Gates has called Sivaram's 2016 essay on clean energy innovation in Foreign Affairs magazine "One of the best arguments I've read for why the U.S. should invest in an energy revolution." The Financial Times called his book Taming the Sun "the best available overview of where the industry finds itself today, and a road map for how it can reach that brighter future," and The Economist called it "prescient...and readable." His TED talk on India's clean energy transition has been viewed more than one million times. TIME Magazine named him to its inaugural TIME 100 Next list of the next hundred most influential people in the world; MIT Technology Review named him one of its top 35 innovators under 35; Forbes named him to its 30 under 30 in Law and Policy; Grist named him one of its top 50 leaders in sustainability; and PV Magazine called him "The Hamilton of the Solar Industry."

=== Publications ===
- Taming the Sun: Innovations to Harness Solar Energy and Power the Planet (MIT Press, 2018 ISBN 9780262037686)
- Energizing America: A Roadmap to Launch a National Energy Innovation Mission (Columbia University Center on Global Energy Policy, 2020 ISBN 9780578758527)
- Digital Decarbonization: Promoting Digital Innovations to Advance Clean Energy Systems (Council on Foreign Relations Press, June 2018 ISBN 9780876097489)
- "The Geopolitical Implications of a Clean Energy Future from the Perspective of the United States," in Scholten, Dan (ed.), The Geopolitics of Renewables (Springer, January 2018 ISBN 978-3-319-67854-2).
- “Solar Energy Is At Risk,” Washington Post, April 16, 2018.
- "How U.S. Tariffs Will Hurt America’s Solar Industry," The New York Times, Jan 24, 2018.
- "Unlocking Clean Energy." Issues in Science and Technology. Winter 2017.
- "The Clean Energy Revolution: Fighting Climate Change with Innovation." Foreign Affairs Mar.-Apr. 2016.
- "Venture Capital and Cleantech: The Wrong Model for Energy Innovation." MIT Energy Institute, 2016.
- "Clean Energy Technology Investors Need Fresh Support after VC Losses." Financial Times 26 July 2016.
- "Solar Power Needs a More Ambitious Cost Target"
- "Outshining Silicon." Scientific American 2015.
- "Reach for the Sun: How India's Audacious Solar Ambitions Could Make or Break Its Climate Commitments." Stanford University Steyer-Taylor Center on Energy Policy and Finance, 2015.
- Powering Los Angeles with Renewable Energy
- Observation of Annealing-Induced Doping in TiO 2 Mesoporous Single Crystals for Use in Solid State Dye Sensitized Solar Cells
- Critique of Charge Collection Efficiencies Calculated through Small Perturbation Measurements of Dye Sensitized Solar Cells
- Mesoporous TiO2 Single Crystals Delivering Enhanced Mobility and Optoelectronic Device Performance
