= Erik Voeten =

Dutch political economist

Erik Voeten (born 1972) is a Dutch political scientist.

== Early life and education ==
Erik Voeten was born in 1972.

He studied public administration and public policy at the University of Twente and earned a doctorate at Princeton University.

== Academic career ==
Voeten completed postdoctoral research at Stanford University's Center for International Security and Cooperation, then joined the George Washington University faculty as an assistant professor.

Voeten was named Peter F. Krogh Professor of Global Justice and Geopolitics at the Edmund A. Walsh School of Foreign Service at Georgetown University in 2007. As of February 2024 he is still in this role, and is also director of the Mortara Center for International Studies.

His research is focused on "the role of international institutions and law in international affairs and... the political economy of the energy transition".

== Editorships ==
He succeeded Jon Pevehouse as chief editor of the International Organization in July 2017.

He is a past editor of The Washington Post blog, The Monkey Cage.

== Books ==
- Ideology and International Institutions (Princeton University Press, January 2021).
