= Kathleen R. McNamara =

American political scientist

- Education: McGill University (BA), Columbia University (MIA, PhD)
- Occupation: Political scientist
- Employer: Georgetown University

Kathleen (Kate) R. McNamara is an American political scientist currently serving as a professor in the Government Department and the School of Foreign Service at Georgetown University. McNamara previously served as the director of the Mortara Center for International Studies and currently serves as co-director of the Global Political Economy Project. In 2018, she was named Distinguished Scholar of International Political Economy by the International Studies Association. Her research focuses on the international political economy of the European Union and the role of ideas, identity, and culture.

== Education and career ==
McNamara received her BA in geography from McGill University in 1984 and her MIA and PhD in political science from Columbia University in 1989 and 1995, respectively. She has previously taught at Princeton University and Sciences Po Paris.

McNamara's work on the European Union is considered an important contribution to scholarship on the subject. Her 1998 book The Currency of Ideas is viewed as a notable constructivist explanation for the origins of the Euro, and her 2015 book The Politics of Everyday Europe has been called "path-breaking," "refreshing" and "crucial" for its analysis of how and why the European Union has become a legitimate political entity, albeit fragile and often contested.

== Awards ==
In 2020, McNamara received the Society for Women in International Political Economy (SWIPE) Mentor Award, which recognizes women and men who have "invested in the professional success" of women in the international political economy field.

== Publications ==
=== Books ===
- The Politics of Everyday Europe: Constructing Authority in the European Union, Oxford University Press, 2015
- The Currency of Ideas: Monetary Politics in the European Union, Cornell University Press, 1998

=== Selected articles ===
- “The Big Reveal: Covid-19 and Globalization’s Great Transformations,” (with Abraham Newman), International Organization COVID-19 Online Supplemental Issue, September 2020
- “Democracy and Collective Identity in the European Union and the United States,” (with Paul Musgrave), JCMS: Journal of Common Market Studies, January 2020
- “The Euro Crisis’ Theory Effect: Northern Saints, Southern Sinners, and the Demise of the Eurobond” (with Matthias Matthijs), Journal of European Integration, 2015
- “Of Intellectual Monocultures and the Study of International Political Economy,” Review of International Political Economy, February 2009
- “Rational Fictions: Central Bank Independence and the Social Logic of Delegation," West European Politics, January 2002
  - Winner of the Vincent Wright Memorial Prize
