= Sean Quinn (writer) =

American journalist

Sean Quinn is an American writer from Clayton, Missouri. He was a member of the White House press corps representing the political blog FiveThirtyEight.com.

Prior to becoming a political journalist, Quinn completed his Juris Doctor at the University of Virginia School of Law and was a political campaign worker. Democratic candidates he worked for include Jon Tester and Ciro Rodriguez.

Quinn led FiveThirtyEight.com's On The Road series, covering the battleground states in person during the 2008 US presidential election. His work provided poignant on the ground observations complementing the statistical analysis of polling data by partner Nate Silver.

After the inauguration of President Obama, Quinn moved to Washington, D.C., to be the White House correspondent for FiveThirtyEight.com. Quinn was one of the first bloggers to be part of the White House press corps.

In August 2011 Sean went back on the road to liveblog the 2012 primaries.
