= Center on Global Energy Policy =

Research center at Columbia University

Center on Global Energy Policy

The Center on Global Energy Policy is a research center located within the School of International and Public Affairs at Columbia University. The center's director is Jason Bordoff, and it features senior research scholars such as Richard Nephew and Varun Sivaram, as well as visiting fellows and adjunct senior research scholars such as Cheryl LaFleur and Richard Kauffman. The center's stated mission is to "advance smart, actionable and evidence-based energy and climate solutions through research, education and dialogue".

== History ==
The Center's New York Office

On April 24, 2013 the Center for Global Energy Policy was founded within Columbia's School of International and Public Affairs. The launch event filled Columbia's historic Low Memorial Library, where mayor Michael Bloomberg spoke about how “New York is where the energy future is taking place”. The center's director, Jason Bordoff, a professor of professional practice and a former special assistant to President Barack Obama, said that he hoped that the center would "break new ground in energy research".

== Publications ==
The Center’s research agenda emphasizes an economic and geostrategic approach to key energy policy areas. Current research programs encompass a wide variety of specific studies and topics, focused both on U.S. policy and specific regions around the world.

== Criticism ==
The Center has been criticized for receiving funding from fossil fuel companies by the Columbia hub of the Sunrise Movement. An estimate by Sunrise Columbia University found that the Center has received almost $16 million from oil and gas companies since its founding. A 2022 study categorized the Center as one of three "fossil-funded centres" (along with the MIT Energy Initiative and Stanford’s Precourt Institute for Energy) and found that reports from the Center are more favorable to natural gas than renewable energy technologies, when compared to non-fossil-funded energy centers.

== Current members of the advisory board ==
The center has a large international advisory board. Members include:

- Nick Beim, Partner at Venrock
- Thomas E. Donilon, Distinguished Fellow at Council on Foreign Relations and former National Security Advisor
- Reid Hoffman, Co-Founder and Executive Chairman, LinkedIn, Partner, Greylock Partners
- Dr. Paul Joskow, President of the Alfred P. Sloan Foundation
- Lady Barbara Judge, Chair of the Energy Institute at University College, London
- John Knight, Executive Vice President at Statoil
- General (Ret.) Stanley A. McChrystal, Co-Founder and Partner at McChrystal Group LLC and former commander, International Security Assistance Force
- Dr. Edward L. Morse, Managing Director, Global Head of Commodities at Citi
- Joel Moser, Founding Chief Executive Officer, AQM Capital LLC and former Partner and Head, Energy & Infrastructure Group at Kaye Scholer
- Daniel Poneman, former Deputy Secretary at the U.S. Department of Energy
- Steven Rattner, Chairman at Willett Advisors LLC and former lead adviser to the Presidential Task Force on the Auto Industry
- Theodore Roosevelt IV, Managing Director, Investment Banking at Barclays
- Zachary Schreiber, Chairman and Chief Investment Officer, PointState Capital
- Mona Sutphen, Partner at Macro Advisory Partners LLP and former White House Deputy Chief of Staff for Policy
- Susan Tierney, Managing Principal at Analysis Group and former Assistant Secretary of Energy for Policy at the U.S. Department of Energy
- Michael D. Tusiani, Chairman at Poten & Partners
- Bill White, Chairman at Lazard Houston and former Mayor of Houston, Texas
- Dr. Daniel Yergin, Vice Chairman at IHS and author of The Prize and The Quest
- Cathy Zoi, Consulting Professor at Stanford University and former Assistant Secretary for Energy Efficiency and Renewable Energy at the U.S. Department of Energy
