= Jason Bordoff =

American energy policy expert

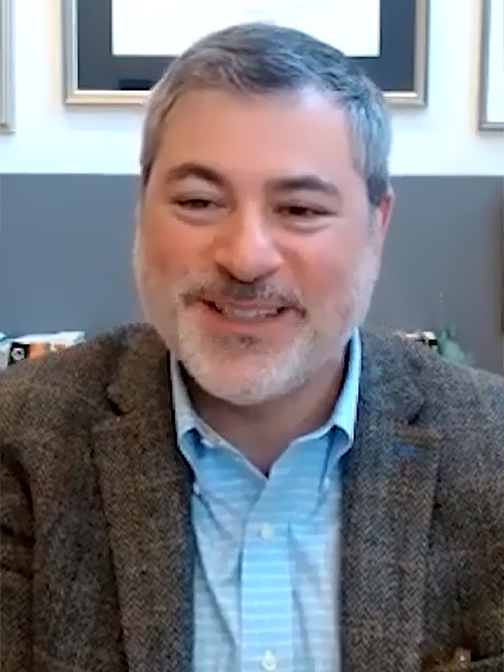
- Born: New York City, New York

Academic background
- Education: Brown University; Wadham College, Oxford; Harvard Law School

Jason Eric Bordoff (born 1972/1973) is an American energy policy expert, and a researcher specializing in the intersection of economics, energy, environment, and national security. In April 2021, he was named a Co-Founding Dean of the Columbia Climate School. Since 2013 he has served as the founding director of the Center on Global Energy Policy at Columbia University's School of International and Public Affairs, where he is also a professor of professional practice. From 2009 to 2013 he served in senior roles in the Obama administration on the Council on Environmental Quality, the National Economic Council, and the National Security Council.

== Early life and education ==
Bordoff was born in Brooklyn, New York City, circa 1972. His father Fred S. Bordoff was an automotive diagnostics and repairs specialist who also managed retail gasoline outlets in Brooklyn, and his mother Ninette emigrated from the Middle East and is an attorney.

Bordoff earned a Bachelor of Arts in political science from Brown University in 1994. He received an M.Litt. in politics from Wadham College, Oxford University, on a Marshall Scholarship, in 1998. Bordoff received a J.D. from Harvard Law School in 2004.

== Career ==
=== Early career ===
Bordoff was a consultant with McKinsey & Company from 1998 to 2000. From 2000 to 2001, he served as special assistant to the Deputy Treasury Secretary Stuart Eizenstat during the Clinton administration. From 2004 to 2005 he was law clerk for the Hon. Stephen F. Williams of the U.S. Court of Appeals, D.C. Circuit.

=== Hamilton Project ===
In 2005, Bordoff joined the Brookings Institution as the Policy Director of the Hamilton Project, a new organization within the Brookings Institution focused on economic research and policy. He held the position through April 2009.

In 2013, he joined a newly developed natural gas task force at Brookings.

=== Obama administration ===
In April 2009, Bordoff joined the Obama White House as the Associate Director for Climate Change at the Council on Environmental Quality. He subsequently worked as Senior Advisor for Energy and Environmental Policy at the National Economic Council, and then Special Assistant to the President and Senior Director for Energy and Climate Change on the staff of the National Security Council, through January 2013.

=== Columbia University and the Center on Global Energy Policy ===
In 2013, Bordoff joined Columbia University's School of International and Public Affairs (SIPA) as a professor of professional practice in international and public affairs. At the same time he also became the founding director of SIPA's Center on Global Energy Policy. Bordoff has been criticized for being too cozy with the fossil fuel industry. BP’s 2018 “Communications Strategy and Tactical Plan” lists both CGEP and Jason Bordoff as “opinion leaders” that “demonstrate that BP is a ‘trusted voice’” and “illustrate BP’s energy transition narrative.”

== Memberships ==
Bordoff is a member of the Council on Foreign Relations. He is a member of the National Petroleum Council, a federal advisory committee that makes recommendations to the U.S. Secretary of Energy. He is on the board of directors of the New York Energy Forum, and is a consultant to the National Intelligence Council. He is on the board of directors of Winrock International, a nonprofit organization whose mission is to increase economic opportunity, sustain natural resources, and protect the environment.

== Journalism ==
Bordoff has published articles in numerous news outlets including the New York Times, Wall Street Journal, and Financial Times. He is a columnist for Foreign Policy magazine. He co-edited a 2008 book with Jason Furman, Path to Prosperity: Hamilton Project Ideas on Income Security, Education, and Taxes, published by the Brookings Institution, and has written a number of journal articles, book chapters, and policy papers.

He is also a frequent commentator on television and radio, including NPR, Bloomberg, CNBC, and BBC.

== Personal life ==
Bordoff married Michelle Greene in 2001. They live in New York City, and have two children.
