= Richard Nephew =

American nuclear weapons and sanctions expert

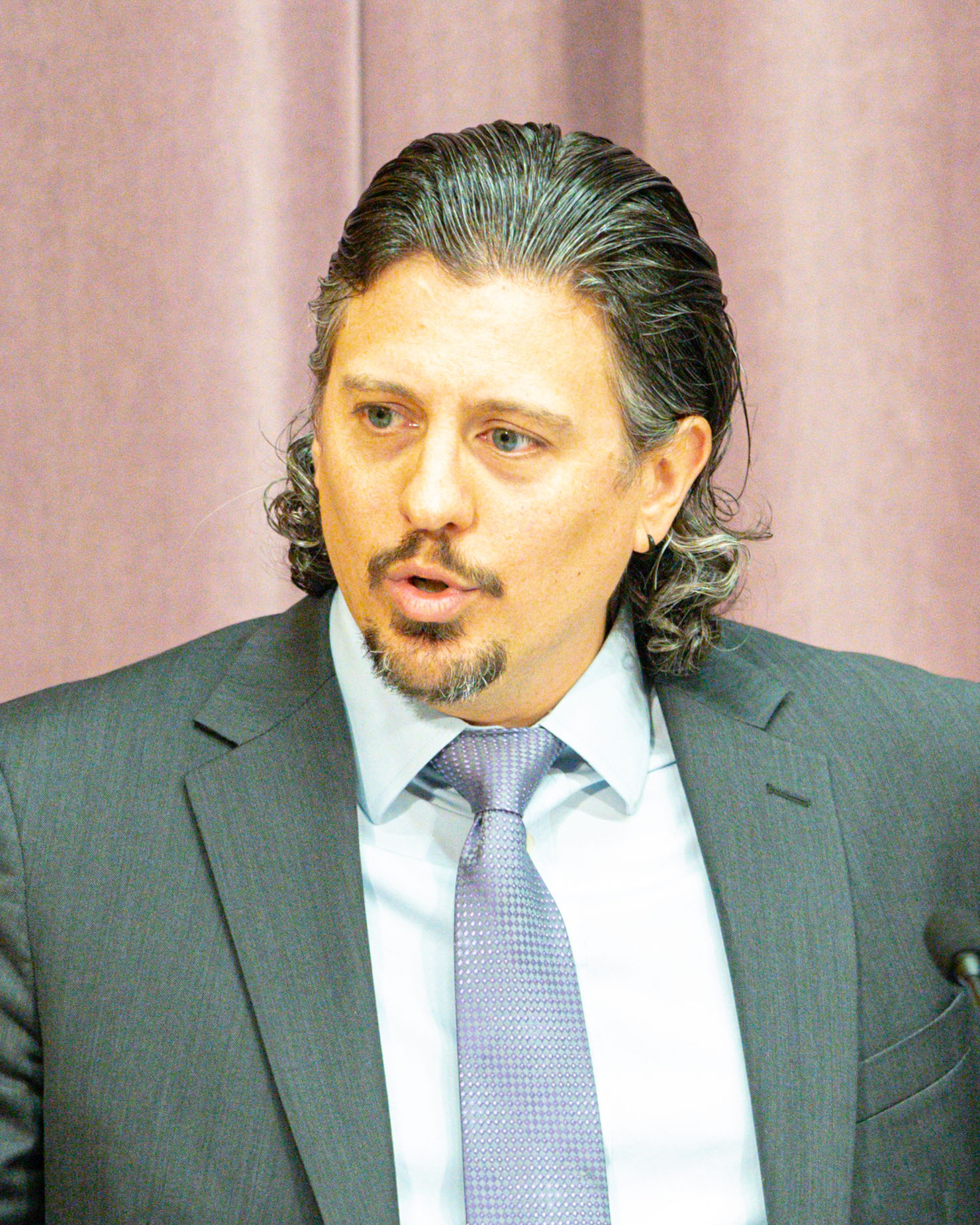
- Nephew in 2022

Coordinator on Global Anti-Corruption
- In office July 5, 2022 – January 20, 2025
- President: Joe Biden

Personal details
- Education: George Washington University (BA, MA)

Richard Nephew is an American nuclear weapons and sanctions expert who is a program director at the Center on Global Energy Policy (CGEP) at Columbia University and a Senior Research Scholar teaching at School of International and Public Affairs, Columbia University. He is the author of The Art of Sanctions, a book from CGEP's Columbia University Press book series. On July 5, 2022, he was named the Coordinator on Global Anti-Corruption by U.S. Secretary of State Antony Blinken. He served in this position until January 2025.

== Early life and education ==
Nephew has a bachelor's degree in international affairs and a master's degree in security policy studies, both from the Elliott School of International Affairs at George Washington University.

== Career ==
After graduating from university, Nephew began at the National Nuclear Security Administration where he worked on international nuclear affairs from June 2003 to June 2006. He then joined the Bureau of International Security and Nonproliferation at the State Department, staying until May 2011. Nephew was then transferred to the National Security Council as the Director for Iranian Affairs for two years. In January 2013, he was named as the Principal Deputy Coordinator for Sanctions Policy at the Department of State, as the lead sanctions expert in negotiations with Iran from August 2013 to December 2014.

On February 1, 2015, left government and joined the Center on Global Energy Policy. Additionally, Nephew served as a non-resident senior fellow at the Brookings Institution.

In September 2025, he was named Distinguished Visiting Fellow with the World Perry House at the University of Pennsylvania.

== Awards ==
Nephew has received numerous awards from the US Department of State and the US Department of Energy, including the Secretary of State's Award for Excellence in International Security in 2008, for his work on UN Security Council Resolution.

== Book ==
- The Art of Sanctions: A View from the Field (Columbia University Press, 2017)

== Views ==
In September 2024, Nephew notes in the Jerusalem Strategic Tribune that “Iran sanctions campaign was immense and difficult to engineer” and “it would be extraordinarily difficult to do it again.”
