= Jessica Hullman =

Computer scientist

Jessica Hullman is an American computer scientist and the Ginni Rometty professor of computer science at Northwestern Universityin Evanston, Illinois, US. Hullman was formerly faculty at the University of Washington Information School (2015-2018). She is known for her research in data-driven decision-making and uncertainty quantification.

== Education ==
Hullman graduated magna cum laude from Ohio State University with a Bachelor of Arts degree in Comparative Studies. She obtained a Masters of Fine Arts degree in Writings and Poetics from Naropa University. Hullman received her Master of Science in Information and doctorate in information science from the University of Michigan, where she was advised by Eytan Adar. She completed a postdoctoral fellowship at the University of California, Berkeley Computer Science Department with Maneesh Agrawal.

== Work ==
Hullman has made contributions to topics including metascience, uncertainty visualization, Bayesian cognition, multi-agent decision-making (including human-AI interaction), AI evaluation, causal inference, and decision-making under uncertainty. Her early work contributed new visualization types to help readers develop an intuitive sense of uncertainty, such as hypothetical outcome plots.

Hullman has given many invited lectures and keynote presentations, including "Strategic Communication of Uncertainty" to the President's Council of Advisors on Science & Technology. Hullman directs the Epistemic Decisions Lab at Northwestern University.

Hullman has written articles for the popular press, including for Wired (with Andrew Gelman), Scientific American, The Hill and National Review (with Allison Schrager). She is a contributor to Andrew Gelman's blog, Statistical Modeling, Causal Inference, and Social Science. With Gelman, she wrote Recursion, a computer science themed play, which was performed at the 2024 ACM Conference on Fairness, Accountability, and Transparency.

== Awards ==
Hullman was one of five computer scientists selected as a Microsoft Research Faculty Fellow in 2019. She is the recipient of numerous best paper awards.
