= Cathy Zoi =

American business executive

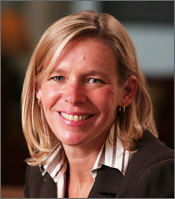

Personal details
- Party: Democratic
- Spouse: Robin Roy
- Education: Duke University; Dartmouth College

Cathy Zoi is an American business executive, and former CEO of EVgo the US's largest fast charging network for electric vehicles. She is the former Assistant Secretary for Energy Efficiency and Renewable Energy (EERE) at the U.S. Department of Energy.

== Career ==
From 2017 to 2023, Zoi served as CEO of EVgo, and was also co-founder and executive chairman of Odyssey Energy (a software start-up offering distributed, renewable electricity to communities and businesses in emerging economies). She formerly served as Chief Strategy Officer at C3 Energy. Prior to that she was a partner at Silver Lake Kraftwerk, "a partnership between Soros Fund Management and Silicon Valley private equity giant Silver Lake Partners". Silver Lake is a Silicon Valley–based growth equity firm focused on energy and resource technology companies in the U.S. and internationally.

Zoi is the founding chief executive officer of the Alliance for Climate Protection, which was established and chaired by former Vice President Al Gore.

Zoi was chief of staff in the White House Office on Environmental Policy in the Clinton-Gore administration, where she managed the team working on environmental and energy issues. She was a manager at the U.S. Environmental Protection Agency (EPA), where she pioneered the Energy Star Program.

She has worked for several energy-focused organizations, as group executive director at the Bayard Group, renamed Landis+Gyr Holdings in 2008, which is a world leader in energy measurement technologies and systems; as the assistant director general of the New South Wales EPA in Sydney, Australia; and as the founding chief executive officer of the New South Wales Sustainable Energy Development Authority (SEDA), a $50 million fund to commercialize greenhouse-friendly technology. Under her leadership, SEDA launched the world's first nationwide green power program and the world's largest solar-powered suburb.

In February 2011, it was announced that Zoi had been hired by George Soros and private equity firm Silver Lake to run an "investment strategy focused on providing growth capital to business innovators in the energy and resource sectors"

At Stanford University in Fall of 2012, she taught a course ENERGY 154: Energy in Transition: Technology, Policy and Politics.

Makani Power announced that Zoi was named in its board of directors at the start of 2013. Google purchased Makani Power in May 2013.

== Energy Star Program ==
During her tenure at the U.S. Environmental Protection Agency (EPA), Zoi founded the Energy Star Program. The Energy Star program was created in the early 1990s by the United States Environmental Protection Agency in an attempt to reduce energy consumption and greenhouse gas emission by power plants. The program was developed by John S. Hoffman, inventor of the Green Programs at EPA, working closely with the IT industry, and implemented by Zoi and Brian Johnson. The program was intended to be part of a series of voluntary programs, such as Green Lights and the Methane Programs, that would demonstrate the potential for profit in reducing greenhouse gases and facilitate further steps to reducing global warming gases.

Initiated as a voluntary labeling program designed to identify and promote energy efficient products, Energy Star began with labels for computer and printer products. In 1995 the program was significantly expanded, introducing labels for residential heating and cooling systems and new homes. As of 2006, more than 40,000 Energy Star products are available in a wide range of items including major appliances, office equipment, lighting, home electronics, and more. In addition, the label can also be found on new homes and commercial and industrial buildings. In 2006, about 12 percent of new housing in the United States was labeled Energy Star. The EPA has estimated it saved about $14 billion in energy costs in 2006 alone. The Energy Star program has helped spread the use of LED traffic lights, efficient fluorescent lighting, power management systems for office equipment, and low standby energy use.

In 2008, the EPA announced Green Power Partnership program, which was designed to help achieve its goal of encouraging the use of renewable power sources. The renewable energy credits allow companies without direct access to renewable power achieve their goals. However, to avoid companies buying RECs years in advance of any of the hypothetical power ever being produced, RECs are only accepted into the program when the actual equivalent renewable power will be produced.

== See also ==
- Climate Institute of Australia
- Silver Lake Partners
