= Daniel Posner =

American political scientist

Daniel N. Posner is an American political scientist and the James S. Coleman Professor of International Development in the Department of Political Science at the University of California, Los Angeles (UCLA). His academic work primarily focuses on ethnic politics, research design, distributive politics, and the political economy of development in Africa. Edward Miguel of University of California, Berkeley, described Posner in 2011 as "one of the leading authorities, on ethnic politics in Africa."

Posner has authored multiple publications on ethnic identity and politics. His first book, Institutions and Ethnic Politics in Africa (2005), received the Gregory Luebbert Book Award from the American Political Science Association (APSA) in 2006 and the Best Book Award from the African Politics Conference Group in 2006. A review in Foreign Affairs characterized the book as a "major advance in the study of ethnic politics [with] important implications for both scholars and policymakers." His co-authored book, Coethnicity: Diversity and the Dilemmas of Collective Action (2009), also received the APSA Gregory Luebbert Book Award in 2010. His scholarship has been recognized with numerous honors, including his election to the American Academy of Arts and Sciences in 2021.

== Early life and education ==
Posner grew up in Tenafly, New Jersey. He earned an A.B. in government from Dartmouth College in 1990, graduating magna cum laude and Phi Beta Kappa. As a senior, he received the department's Rockefeller Prize for the best undergraduate thesis in comparative politics.

Posner went on to pursue graduate studies at Harvard University, completing a Ph.D. in government in 1998. His doctoral dissertation on the institutional origins of ethnic politics in Zambia earned the 1999 Gabriel A. Almond Award from the American Political Science Association for the best dissertation in comparative politics.

== Academic career ==
After completing his Ph.D., Posner joined the faculty of the University of California, Los Angeles (UCLA) as an assistant professor of political science in 1998. He was promoted to associate professor in 2005.

From 2011 to 2013, Posner served as a professor of political science at the Massachusetts Institute of Technology (MIT), where he held the Total Chair on Contemporary Africa. He returned to UCLA in 2013 and was appointed the James S. Coleman Professor of International Development.

Throughout his career, Posner has held numerous fellowships and affiliations. He was a Harvard Academy Scholar at the Academy for International and Area Studies from 1995 to 1998, and a National Fellow at the Hoover Institution at Stanford University from 2001 to 2002. He was selected as a Carnegie Scholar by the Carnegie Corporation of New York from 2003 to 2005, and was a Fellow at the Center for Advanced Study in the Behavioral Sciences at Stanford during 2010–2011.

He is a co-founder of the Working Group in African Political Economy (WGAPE), and a member of the Evidence in Governance and Politics (EGAP) network. He is also a faculty affiliate of the Center for Effective Global Action (CEGA) and a research affiliate of the International Growth Centre (IGC).

In addition to his research and teaching roles, Posner served on the editorial board of the Journal of Politics from 2005 to 2007 and was previously a USAID Democracy Fellow for Research and Policy.

== Research and contributions ==
Posner's research focuses on comparative politics, with a regional specialization in sub-Saharan Africa. His work explores how ethnic identities interact with political institutions to shape patterns of political competition, coalition-building, and the provision of public goods. He argues that ethnic identities are "nested," and that different levels of identity—such as tribal, linguistic, or regional—become politically salient depending on institutional incentives and the structure of party systems.

His first book, Institutions and Ethnic Politics in Africa (2005), is based on extensive fieldwork in Zambia and examines why certain ethnic cleavages become politically relevant while others do not. The book demonstrates that under single-party rule, people identify more strongly with narrow tribal affiliations, while under multi-party competition, broader linguistic or regional identities become politically salient. The book received both the Luebbert Book Award from the American Political Science Association (APSA) and the Best Book Award from the African Politics Conference Group in 2006.

Posner is also the co-author of Coethnicity: Diversity and the Dilemmas of Collective Action (2009), alongside James Habyarimana, Macartan Humphreys, and Jeremy M. Weinstein. The book uses experimental evidence from Uganda to explore how ethnic diversity can hinder the collective provision of public goods. The authors find that individuals in ethnically diverse settings are less likely to sanction free-riders and more likely to distrust others, reducing cooperation overall.

Their 2007 article, "Why Does Ethnic Diversity Undermine Public Goods Provision?", published in the American Political Science Review, presents experimental findings that support these conclusions. The article earned both the Heinz Eulau Award (for best article in the journal) and the Michael Wallerstein Award (for best article in political economy) from the APSA in 2008.

Posner's 2004 article in the American Political Science Review, "The Political Salience of Cultural Difference: Why Chewas and Tumbukas Are Allies in Zambia and Adversaries in Malawi," explores how the political relevance of ethnicity can vary depending on demographics and institutional structures. This publication is noted as his "best-known work" in an MIT News profile, and according to Google Scholar, it had been cited over 1,100 times by May 2025.

Beyond ethnic politics, Posner has published on topics related to distributive politics, political accountability, institutional reform, and experimental political science. He is recognized for advancing the use of field experiments in African politics and for helping to build collaborative academic networks such as WGAPE and EGAP.

== Selected publications ==
- Institutions and Ethnic Politics in Africa. Cambridge: Cambridge University Press, 2005. ISBN 9780521833985.
- Coethnicity: Diversity and the Dilemmas of Collective Action (with James Habyarimana, Macartan Humphreys, and Jeremy M. Weinstein). New York: Russell Sage Foundation, 2009. ISBN 9780871548823.
- "The Political Salience of Cultural Difference: Why Chewas and Tumbukas Are Allies in Zambia and Adversaries in Malawi." American Political Science Review, Vol. 98, No. 4 (2004), pp. 529–545.
- "Why Does Ethnic Diversity Undermine Public Goods Provision?" (with James Habyarimana, Macartan Humphreys, and Jeremy M. Weinstein). American Political Science Review, Vol. 101, No. 4 (2007), pp. 709–725.

== Awards and honors ==
- Rockefeller Prize, Dartmouth College (1990), awarded for the best undergraduate thesis in comparative politics. * Gabriel A. Almond Award, American Political Science Association (1999), for best dissertation in comparative politics.
- Sage Award, APSA Comparative Politics Section (2004), for best paper in comparative politics presented at the APSA annual meeting.
- Best Book Award, African Politics Conference Group (2006), for Institutions and Ethnic Politics in Africa.
- Gregory Luebbert Book Award, APSA Comparative Politics Section (2006, 2010), for best book in comparative politics. * Heinz Eulau Award, APSA (2008), for best article in the American Political Science Review.
- Michael Wallerstein Award, APSA Political Economy Section (2008), for best article in political economy.
- Best Paper Award, APSA Experimental Research Section (2019), for best paper in experimental political science.
- Elected Fellow, American Academy of Arts and Sciences (2021).

== Personal life ==
Posner is married to Jennifer De Maio, a professor of political science at California State University, Northridge. They have three children. The family resides in Los Angeles, California.
