= Fotini Christia =

Greek political scientist

- Born: Thessaloniki, Greece

Academic background
- Education: Columbia University (BA, MA); Harvard University (PhD)
- Doctoral advisor: Robert Bates; Stephen Walt; Michael Ignatieff

Academic work
- Discipline: Political science
- Institutions: Massachusetts Institute of Technology

Fotini Christia is a Greek political scientist. She is the Ford International Professor of the Social Sciences at Massachusetts Institute of Technology.

== Biography ==
Christia grew up in Salonika, Greece. Her father is an agricultural economist. She received her BA from Columbia College, Phi Beta Kappa, in 2000 and her MA from School of International and Public Affairs, Columbia University in 2001. She received her PhD from Harvard University in 2008 and her advisors included Robert Bates, Stephen Walt, and Michael Ignatieff, to whom she served as a teaching assistant for four years. Her research has focused on the political economy of conflict and development in the Muslim world as well as using data science and social science methods to address systemic racism in housing, healthcare, policing, and social media.

Her 2012 book "Alliance Formation in Civil Wars," uses realist insights in international relations theory and argues that alliance formation are not inherently based on ethnic or religious lines, but reflect balance of power considerations. The book was the recipient of a number of awards from the American Political Science Association and the International Studies Association.

In 2015, Christia was named to the inaugural class of the Andrew Carnegie Fellows program initiated by the Carnegie Corporation of New York.

She was named director of MIT's Sociotechnical Systems Research Center in 2020, focusing on the study of high-impact, complex societal challenges around the world.
