= The Hell of Good Intentions =

2018 book by Stephen M. Walt

- Book cover
- Author: Stephen Walt
- Language: English
- Genre: Non-fiction books about world affairs
- Publisher: Farrar, Straus and Giroux
- Publication date: 18 October 2018
- Publication place: United States
- Pages: 400
- ISBN: 978-0374280031

The Hell of Good Intentions: America's Foreign Policy Elite and the Decline of U.S. Primacy is a book by Stephen M. Walt, which focuses on the foreign policy of the U.S. government. According to the Belfer Center for Science and International Affairs, Walt unveils the reality of White House foreign policy and argues that past U.S. presidents such as Clinton, Bush, and Obama, avoided accountability for repeated failures of their foreign policies. He also argues that such foreign policy mistakes contributed to the election of Donald Trump as president. In the book, Walt offers his take on what U.S. foreign policy should be and suggests that U.S. politicians should change their foreign policy approach.

In the book, Walt, a professor of international affairs at Harvard University, reviews U.S. foreign policy and its results over the past quarter-century. Lloyd Green, of The Guardian website writes that Walt places the onus for what he argues is the decline of the U.S. on its foreign policy, and that he argues for an "offshore balancing strategy" under which the U.S. would allow regional actors to play out their own conflicts. That foreign policy strategy is similar to the approach of President Richard Nixon.

Walt argues that the U.S. has spent trillions of dollars abroad fighting terrorists, attempting to expand democracy, and ensuring the security of other countries. He also believes that those strategies have failed to achieve their goal.

Walt presents an analysis of the foreign policies used by the Clinton, Bush, and Obama administrations. He goes on to argue that their foreign policy strategies were failures, and the presidents responsible have been able to avoid accountability. Walt argues that past presidential failures facilitated Trump's bid to become U.S. president. Walt argues that U.S. foreign policies in other countries have changed over time from using military force to expanding democracy to maintaining a balance of power.

Walt outlines a number of different potential foreign policy strategies. He explores some of those policies, including offshore balancing, which calls for the U.S. to focus its offshore capabilities on Europe, the Persian Gulf, and Northeast Asia by using favored regional powers to check the rise of potentially-hostile powers; and the Nixon Doctrine, a position expounded by Nixon, which states that every crisis does not warrant American troops and firepower and that American involvement can engender resentment and blowback in American society.

Walt declares the folly of grand ambitions and considers that "doing something" can be far more costly than watching and waiting. Finally, he proposes his own foreign policy strategy by advocating offshore balancing, a return to diplomacy, and the prioritizing of peace.

== See also ==
- The Israel Lobby and U.S. Foreign Policy
- America Against the World
