= Global Editors Network =

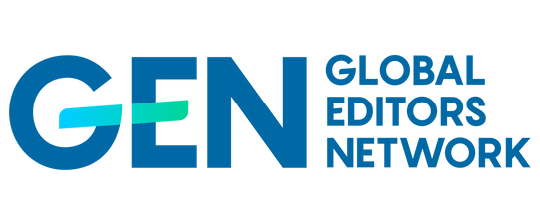
- Established: 1 March 2011; 15 years ago
- Dissolved: 7 November 2019; 6 years ago
- Location: Paris, France
- Key people: Jim Roberts, President; Bertrand Pecquerie, CEO
- Subsidiaries: GEN Training & Consulting
- Employees: 10

The Global Editors Network (GEN) was an international association of over 6,000 editors-in-chief and media executives with the mission of fostering digital innovation in newsrooms all over the world. GEN had three main programmes: Editors Lab, the Data Journalism Awards, Startups for News, as well as an upcoming hub for the international data journalism community. The organisation’s flagship event, the GEN Summit, gathered over 830 participants from 70 countries. The GEN newsletter was read weekly by more than 13,800 subscribers. It is a non-profit, non-governmental association.

Its goal was to empower newsroom leaders to innovate by breaking down the barriers between traditional and new media. GEN also strived to demonstrate the value of data journalism so that information can be gathered and shared to define an open journalism model for the future, and create new journalistic concepts and tools. The GEN Community was launched in September 2014. The GEN Community website enabled people to connect, share, compare, collaborate on new media projects. Prototypes from the Editors Lab program and the Data Journalism Awards were also featured on the GEN Community. There were more than 1,600 projects and 3,900 members on the GEN Community. The GEN Community was supported by the Open Society Foundations.

GEN was established to respond to the increasing risks journalism faces, as media must be relevant and constantly innovate. Its role was to gather editors with different knowledge sets and to start a dialogue with engineers, developers and digital innovators. Its founding members were leading editors and top executives at The Washington Post, El País, BBC, Le Monde, Aftenposten, The Guardian, Clarìn, and many other media brands worldwide. It was a nonprofit organisation, financed through grants, membership, participation to the annual GEN Summit, sponsorship and donations.

The Global Editors Network announced on 7 November 2019 that it would cease its activities due to a lack of sustainable finances.

== Mission ==
GEN's objective was to promote newsroom innovation, foster new storytelling methods, and define the future of journalism by empowering editors-in-chief and senior news executives when working with publishers, media owners and news suppliers, as the delivery of news migrated to digital platforms. Editors on all platforms were confronted with the same challenges in news production. It was more obvious every day that they are members of the same community, all driven by a journalistic imperative and a common goal: how to invent tomorrow's journalism and to make it sustainable.

The senior news executives who founded the Global Editors Network (GEN) were convinced that news producers and newsrooms across all platforms – print, broadcast, online, mobile and wire services – face comparable challenges. The association encouraged multilateral cooperation and collaborated with media development bodies and international journalism associations.

== Activities ==
The GEN Summit conference gathered every year more than 750 editors-in-chief, journalists, data journalists, developers, designers, and entrepreneurs., and became one of the most popular media conferences. This conference also included the Data Journalism Awards ceremony, one of the main programmes of GEN, along with Startups for News, and the Editors Lab final.

The GEN Summit took place in the following cities:

- 27–30 November 2011: Hong Kong
- 30 May-1 June 2012 and 19–21 June 2013: Paris
- 11–13 June 2014 and 17–19 June 2015: Barcelona
- 15–17 June 2016: Vienna
- 21–23 June 2017: Vienna
- 30 May–1 June 2018: Lisbon

The GEN Summit 2019 took place in Athens, Greece, from the 13th to the 15th of June at the Stavros Niarchos Foundation Cultural Center.

The Data Journalism Awards, the first international contest recognising outstanding work in the field of data journalism. In 2015, a total of 14 winners were selected from a shortlist of 78 by a jury panel led by Paul Steiger from ProPublica. In 2016, 12 winners were chosen among 471 submissions. In 2017, 12 winners were chosen among 573 submissions. In 2018, 12 winners were chosen among 630 entries from 58 countries.

The Data Journalism Den was a global hub solely dedicated to data journalism. It was a place built for journalists, coders, designers, experts, consultants, companies, foundations, volunteers, NGOs, and everyone involved or interested in the use and development of data journalism.

The Editors Lab, a worldwide series of hackathons where teams of journalists, designers and developers compete in the development of innovative journalism tools, content and apps. These are hosted by newsrooms all over the world. Past editions were in: Poland, France, Netherlands, Turkey, UK, Spain, Germany, Indonesia, India, and more. The Final occurs during the GEN Summit and gathers the winning teams of each Editors Lab event. The purpose of Editors Lab is to ″break the barriers between the editorial and technical teams.″. The Editors Lab program partnered with Rappler for the sake of providing hackathons for Southeast Asian Nations.

Startups For News is an international competition that rewards the most innovative startups disrupting the media industry. GEN selects startups that challenge the status quo with new editorial services for newsrooms or new ways of delivering journalistic content. During the GEN Summit, the winning startups from each category have the opportunity to pitch their work to GEN’s network of media innovators. The startups are also able to showcase their product in a dedicated ‘Startups for News’ area at the GEN Summit exhibitors room. The winner of the Startup For News Final 2015 was SourceRise, and Trint, a transcription company, won in 2016. In 2017, the startup Flourish won, while Urbs Media was a runner-up in the competition. In 2018, Vigilant won the competition.

In 2018, GEN partnered with the European Forest Institute to launch the pilot project Lookout360°, which supports journalists produce 360-degree videos on climate change and people’s lives. Lookout360° is the pilot project of a 6-month immersive storytelling accelerator programme. It combines in-field training and 3-month mentorship to support journalists produce immersive stories with a focus on climate change.

Climate Publishers Network – Ahead of the UN Climate Change Summit (COP21) in Paris, 25 media organisations from around the world created a new publishers network to collaborate on their coverage of climate change. The initiative was coordinated by the Global Editors Network. The Climate Publishers Network (CPN) provided a mutual syndication of articles related to climate change free of charge during the run-up to COP21. Each media organisation was able to re-publish material without having to worry about license fees.

Digital Journalism Massive open online course (MOOC), in French, in conjunction with Rue89 and First Business MOOC. GEN has coordinated three MOOCs since the launch.

GEN Study Tours – Launched in 2013, the study tours programme aims to help discovery and practice sharing between editors.

== Board members ==
The 14 GEN Board Members were executives from news organisations such as Mic, ProPublica, El País, Clarín, Rappler, Cheddar, Aftenposten, etc.

The President since September 2018 was Jim Roberts (editor-in-chief, Cheddar.com, replacing Cory Haik, former publisher of MIC and Peter Bale (former Chief Executive Officer at the Center for Public Integrity), after two years. The previous GEN Presidents were Xavier Vidal-Folch, Deputy Director of El País, and Ricardo Kirschbaum, the General Editor of Clarín.

Bertrand Pecquerie was the CEO of the association until its closure in November 2019.

== Closure ==
The Global Editors Network announced on 7 November 2019 that it would cease its activities due to a lack of sustainable finances. CEO Bertrand Pecquerie said In a statement that it had become increasingly difficult to maintain a balance between GEN’s three main funding sources and to further diversify them. The GEN board explored a number of options to continue GEN's work, but concluded they would not be enough to sustain the organization.
