= John M. Sides =

John M. Sides is an American political scientist.

He graduated from the University of North Carolina at Chapel Hill as Morehead-Cain Scholar in 1996 and pursued a doctorate at the University of California, Berkeley. Sides then began his teaching career as an assistant professor at the University of Texas at Austin. He subsequently joined the George Washington University faculty, then was appointed William R. Kenan Jr. Chair and Professor at Vanderbilt University. He currently serves as the chair of the Department of Political Science at Vanderbilt University.

Sides cofounded The Monkey Cage, a political science blog, in 2007. The Monkey Cage published for many years at the Washington Post. In 2023, Sides founded The Monkey Cage's successor, Good Authority. Good Authority seeks to bring insights from political science to a broader audience.

== Selected publications ==
- Sides, John; Tesler, Michael; Vavreck, Lynn (2018). Identity Crisis: The 2016 Presidential Campaign and the Battle for the Meaning of America. Princeton University Press. ISBN 9780691174198.
- Sides, John; Vavreck, Lynn (2013). The Gamble: Choice and Chance in the 2012 Presidential Election. Princeton University Press. ISBN 9780691156880.
