= The Monkey Cage (blog) =

Political science blog at The Washington Post

The Monkey Cage was a political science blog. Established in 2007, it was published by The Washington Post from 2013 through 2022. In 2023 it relaunched as the website Good Authority.

== History ==
The blog was created in 2007 by a small group of academics, in a quest to get people interested in their political science research. It soon attracted writers, gained readers, and won awards

In 2013, it entered into a three-year publishing deal with The Washington Post, which was renewed several times over the years.

After leaving The Washington Post in 2022, the blog planned to relaunch as an independent site in 2023. It has since relaunched as the website Good Authority.

== Purpose and contents ==
The blog was created in part to push back on political media coverage and policy discourse that ignored political science research. The blog's contents have been described as a form of explainer-journalism, as the blog primarily published short editorials by academic political scientists who summarized their political-science research or apply political science to current events. The blog also occasionally published pieces by scholars in related academic disciplines.

Political scientist Erik Voeten was an editor on The Monkey Cage for some time.

== Recognition ==
In 2011, the blog won "Blog of the Year" by The Week magazine.

The blog's content has been cited in numerous newspapers. According to John M. Sides, the blog was visited by 719,000 people and viewed over 2 million times from November 2007 and December 2010.
