= Uniform national swing =

Uniform national swing, or UNS is a system for translating opinion polls, which give overall vote proportions, to expected eventual parliamentary seats in a constituency based first past the post system, as in the UK general elections. Under the uniform national swing, changes in the vote proportions (swing) since the previous election are assumed to be constant across all constituencies. By applying this change to the previous per-constituency based vote proportions, a prediction for which party would have the most votes in each constituency may be made, which is then counted and totalled for a final seat count.

Alternative methods exist, such as the proportional national swing system. According to Peter Kellner, UNS has a mixed record of success at predicting seat counts in the UK.
