= Polarity (international relations) =

Way in which power is distributed within the international system

Polarity in international relations is any of the various ways in which power is distributed within the international system. It describes the nature of the international system at any given period of time. One generally distinguishes three types of systems: unipolarity, bipolarity, and multipolarity for three or more centers of power. The type of system is completely dependent on the distribution of power and influence of states in a region or across the globe.

The Cold War period was widely understood as one of bipolarity with the US and the USSR as the world's two superpowers, whereas the end of the Cold War led to unipolarity with the US as the world's sole superpower in the 1990s and 2000s. Some scholars believe that the world is currently bipolar with the US and China as the world's dominant powers. However, scholars have debated how to characterize the current international system.

Political scientists do not have an agreement on the question what kind of international politics polarity is likely to produce the most stable and peaceful system. Kenneth Waltz and John Mearsheimer are among those who argue that bipolarity tends to produce a relatively high stability. In contrast, John Ikenberry and William Wohlforth are among those arguing for the stabilizing impact of unipolarity. Some scholars, such as Karl Deutsch and J. David Singer, argued that multipolarity was the most stable structure.

== Debates about whether polarity matters ==
Bruce Bueno de Mesquita has argued that the correlation between polarity of any kind and conflict is statistically weak, and depends critically on systemic uncertainty and risk attitudes among individual actors. Jeffrey Legro has argued that polarity is not among the foremost factors in explaining world politics, noting that ideational factors also matter in world politics.

== Unipolarity ==
Unipolarity is a condition in which one state under the condition of international anarchy enjoys a preponderance of power and faces no competitor states. According to William Wohlforth, "a unipolar system is one in which a counterbalance is impossible. When a counterbalance becomes possible, the system is not unipolar." A unipolar state is not the same as an empire or a hegemon that can control the behavior of all other states.

=== American primacy ===
Numerous thinkers predicted U.S. primacy in the 20th century onwards, including William Gladstone, Michel Chevalier, Kang Youwei, Georges Vacher de Lapouge, H. G. Wells in Anticipations (1900), and William Thomas Stead. (Note: Alexis de Tocqueville in the mid-19th century had expected the bipolar world centered on America and Russia but had not advanced beyond bipolarity.)

Liberal institutionalist John Ikenberry argues in a series of influential writings that the United States purposely set up an international order after the end of World War II that sustained U.S. primacy. In his view, realist predictions of power balancing did not bear fruit because the United States engaged in strategic restraint after World War II, thereby convincing weaker states that it was more interested in cooperation rather than domination. U.S. strategic restraint allowed weaker countries to participate in the make-up of the post-war world order, which limited opportunities for the United States to exploit total power advantages. Ikenberry notes that while the United States could have unilaterally engaged in unfettered power projection, it decided instead to "lock in" its advantage long after zenith by establishing an enduring institutional order, gave weaker countries a voice, reduced great power uncertainty, and mitigated the security dilemma. The liberal basis of U.S. hegemony—a transparent democratic political system—has made it easier for other countries to accept the post-war order, Ikenberry explains. "American hegemony is reluctant, open, and highly institutionalized—or in a word, liberal" and "short of large-scale war or a global economic crisis, the American hegemonic order appears to be immune to would-be hegemonic challengers."

The term hyperpower has been used by some political scientists and historians to describe an uncontested superpower, although the use of the concept is inconsistent. French foreign minister Hubert Védrine coined the term in 1999 to describe what he saw as the historically-unparalleled influence and might held by the United States after the dissolution of the Soviet Union.

=== Current debates ===
Scholars have debated whether the current international order (as of 2025) is characterized by unipolarity, bipolarity or multipolarity. Currently, the United States is no longer an uncontested superpower, partly due to not dominating in every single domain (i.e. military, culture, economy, technology, diplomatic) in every part of the world. Although it is still the most powerful military and has the largest economy by nominal GDP (although China has surpassed the United States in GDP purchasing power parity, and could surpass the United States nominal GDP in the coming decades), China has made significant gains in cultural influence and technology. The Asia Power Index 2025 classifies both the United States and China as superpowers, with the U.S. taking the lead in military capacity, cultural influence, resilience, defense networks, economic resources, and future resources, but lagging behind China in economic relationships and diplomatic influence across eight measures in Asia.

Michael Beckley argues American primacy is vastly underestimated because power indices frequently fail to take into account GDP per capita in the U.S. relative to other purportedly powerful states, such as China and India. He has argued that the current international system is not characterized by "multipolarity but stark asymmetry: one consolidated American sphere and contested space everywhere else."

In 2011, Barry Posen argued that unipolarity was in wane and that the world was shifting towards multipolarity. In 2019, John Mearsheimer argued that the international system was shifting from unipolarity to multipolarity.

In 2022, William Wohlforth argued that the international system was heading towards a system that can be characterized neither as bipolarity nor multipolarity. He added that polarity did not appear to matter as much in the current international system, as great powers command a far smaller share of power vis-a-vis the rest of the states in the international system. In 2023, Wohlforth and Stephen Brooks argued that the United States is still the unipole but that U.S. power has weakened and the nature of U.S. unipolarity has changed. They add, "The world is neither bipolar nor multipolar, and it is not about to become either. Yes, the United States has become less dominant over the past 20 years, but it remains at the top of the global power hierarchy—safely above China and far, far above every other country... Other countries simply cannot match the power of the United States by joining alliances or building up their militaries."

=== Impact on conflict and cooperation ===
Scholars have debated the durability and peacefulness of unipolarity. William Wohlforth argues that unipolarity is durable and peaceful because it reduces the likelihood of hegemonic rivalry (because no state is powerful enough to challenge the unipole) and it reduces the salience and stakes of balance of power politics among the major states, thus reducing the likelihood that attempts at balances of power cause major war. Wohlforth builds his argument on hegemonic stability theory and a rejection of the balance of power theory. With no great power to check its adventurism, the United States will weaken itself by misusing its power internationally. "Wide latitude" of "policy choices" will allow the U.S. to act capriciously on the basis of "internal political pressure and national ambition." Bruce Bueno de Mesquita has argued that the correlation between polarity of any kind and conflict is statistically weak, and depends critically on systemic uncertainty and risk attitudes among individual actors.

According to Carla Norrlöf, U.S. unipolarity is stable and sustainable due to a combination of three factors: 1. The status of the American dollar as the world's dominant reserve currency, 2. American commercial power, and 3. American military preponderance. The United States benefits disproportionately from its status as hegemon. Other states do not challenge U.S. hegemony because many of them benefit from the U.S.-led order, and there are significant coordination problems in creating an alternative world order.

Nuno P. Monteiro argues that unipolarity is conflict-prone, both between the unipole and other states, and exclusively among other states. Monteiro substantiates this by remarking that "the United States has been at war for thirteen of the twenty-two years since the end of the Cold War. Put another way, the first two decades of unipolarity, which make up less than 10 percent of U.S. history, account for more than 25 percent of the nation's total time at war." Kenneth Waltz that unipolarity is "the least durable of international configurations." Secondly, even if the United States acts benevolently, states will still attempt to balance against it because the power asymmetry demands it: In a self-help system, states do not worry about other states' intentions as they do other states' capabilities. "Unbalanced power leaves weaker states feeling uneasy and gives them reason to strengthen their positions," Waltz says.

In a 2009 study, Martha Finnemore argues that unipolarity has, contrary to some expectations, not given the United States a free rein to do what it wants and that unipolarity has proven to be quite frustrating for the United States. The reasons for this is that unipolarity does not just entail a material superiority by the unipole, but also a social structure whereby the unipole maintains its status through legitimation, and institutionalization. In trying to obtain legitimacy from the other actors in the international system, the unipole necessarily gives those actors a degree of power. The unipole also obtains legitimacy and wards off challenges to its power through the creation of institutions, but these institutions also entail a diffusion of power away from the unipole.

In a 2021 study, Yuan-kang Wang argues from the experience of Ming China (1368–1644) and Qing China (1644–1912) that the durability of unipolarity is contingent on the ability of the unipole to sustain its power advantage and for potential challengers to increase their power without provoking a military reaction from the unipole.

== Bipolarity ==
Bipolarity is a distribution of power in which two states have a preponderance of power. In bipolarity, spheres of influence and alliance systems have frequently developed around each pole. For example, in the Cold War, most Western and capitalist states would fall under the influence of the USA, while most Communist states would fall under the influence of the USSR. According to Wohlforth and Brooks, "the world was undeniably bipolar" during the Cold War. Some scholars believe that the world is currently bipolar with the US and China as the world's dominant powers. In a 2026 book, Randall Schweller characterized the current international system as one of "unbalanced bipolarity", similar to the system that existed from 1945 to 1970.

Historic examples of bipolarity include ancient China's Chu and Jin (636–546 B.C.), Rome and Iran (224–628), Tang and the Umayyad Caliphate during the Muslim conquest of Transoxiana, Spain and the Ottoman Caliphate (1517–1635), Great Britain and France in the 18th century from the end of the War of the Spanish Succession (1701–1715) to the Seven Years' War (1754–1763) and the French Revolutionary and Napoleonic Wars (1792–1815), and the United States and the Soviet Union during the Cold War (1947–1991).

=== Impact on conflict and cooperation ===
Kenneth Waltz's influential Theory of International Politics argued that bipolarity tended towards the greatest stability because the two great powers would engage in rapid mutual adjustment, which would prevent inadvertent escalation and reduce the chance of power asymmetries forming. John Mearsheimer also argued, that bipolarity is the most stable form of polarity, as buck-passing is less frequent. Dale C. Copeland has challenged Waltz on this, arguing that bipolarity creates a risk for war when a power asymmetry or divergence happens.

Dale C. Copeland's The Origins of Major Wars claims that having two powers can lead to large conflicts as the two powers are likely to posture against one another knowing they are each other's only real threat. He argues that despite traditionalists putting blame on Russia for the Cold War, conflict was inevitable as without Russian aggression, the US was still going to put containment policies in place against Russia due to their position as an oppositional power, which would have sparked the same conflict.

Conversely, in his influential book, Theory of International Politics, Kenneth Waltz argues that the monitoring and posturing against each other is positive in regards to international security. He claims that, in a multipolar system, a major development in one state may seem relatively unimportant as responsibility and consequences are spread across multiple states. However, in a bipolar system, major developments in one state immediately matters to the other state as it greatly shifts the balance of power in one direction. As each state has an incentive to closely monitor one another, they both rapidly adjust to each other, making it difficult for either state to make incremental gains over one another without the other responding promptly.

In his book, The Tragedy of Great Power Politics, Mearsheimer claims that bipolarity is the optimal power system as it introduces the least amount of fear among the great powers. Like Waltz, Mearsheimer argues that in a bipolar system, the threatened state will balance promptly and efficiently as neither buck passing nor great-power balancing coalitions are feasible in a system with two great powers. Additionally, Mearsheimer claims that internal balancing promotes peace when compared to external balancing. Because there are no potential great-power alliance partners in a bipolar system, external balancing is limited, therefore great powers must rely on internal balancing, although it is still possible for great powers to create alliances with minor powers.

== Multipolarity ==
Multipolarity is a distribution of power in which more than two states have similar amounts of power. The Concert of Europe, a period from after the Napoleonic Wars to the Crimean War, was an example of peaceful multipolarity (the great powers of Europe assembled regularly to discuss international and domestic issues), as was the Interwar period. Examples of wartime multipolarity include World War I, World War II, the Thirty Years War, the Warring States period, the Three Kingdoms period, and the tripartite division between the Song, Liao, and Jin dynasties, prior to their fall at the behest of the emerging Yuan dynasty.

=== Impact on conflict and cooperation ===
Classical realist theorists, such as Hans Morgenthau and E. H. Carr, hold that multipolar systems are more stable than bipolar systems, as great powers can gain power through alliances and petty wars that do not directly challenge other powers; in bipolar systems, classical realists argue, this is not possible.

Neorealists hold that multipolar systems are particularly unstable and conflict-prone, as there is greater complexity in managing alliance systems, and a greater chance of misjudging the intentions of other states. Thomas Christensen and Jack Snyder argue that multipolarity tends towards instability and conflict escalation due to "chain-ganging" (allies get drawn into unwise wars provoked by alliance partners) and "buck-passing" (states which do not experience an immediate proximate threat do not balance against the threatening power in the hope that others carry the cost of balancing against the threat). John Mearsheimer also argues that buck passing is more common in multipolar systems.

Multipolarity does not guarantee multilateralism and can pose a challenge against multilateralism. According to Kemal Derviş, a decline in unipolarity creates a crisis in multilateralism; it is possible to revive multilateralism in a multipolar system, but this is more threatened and the structure to do so is not fully developed. In multipolarity, larger powers can negotiate "mega-regional" agreements more easily than smaller ones. When there are multiple competing great powers, this can lead to the smaller states being left out of such agreements. Though multipolar orders form regional hegemonies around 'poles' or great powers, this can weaken economic interdependencies within regions, at least in regions without a great power. Additionally, as multipolar systems can tend to regional hegemonies or bounded orders, agreements are formed within these bounded orders rather than globally. Though, Mearsheimer predicts the persistence of a thin international order within multipolarity, which constitutes some multilateral agreements.

The term multipolarity has been used to describe the development of close relations between China and the Russian Federation after the Cold War, emerging out of the shared goal to disrupt American leadership in the international system. According to Edina Julianna Haiszky, the Russian-Chinese alliance to create a multipolar international system is informed by their self-perception as independent civilisations rather than nation-states, precipitating a political desire to act as active shapers of the international system.

== Measuring the power concentration ==
The Correlates of War uses a systemic concentration of power formula to calculate the polarity of a given great power system. The formula was developed by J. David Singer et al. in 1972.

$$\text{Concentration}_t = \sqrt{\frac{\sum_{i=1}^{N_t} (S_{it})^2 - \frac{1}{N_t}}{1 - \frac{1}{N_t}}}$$

t = the time at which the concentration of resources (i.e. power) is being calculated
i = the state of which the proportion of control over the system's power is being measured
N_{t} = the number of states in the great power system at time t
S = the proportion of power possessed. Hence, S_{it} = the proportion of power possessed by state i at time t.

The expression $\sum_{i=1}^n (S_{it})^2$ represents the sum of the squares of the proportion of power possessed by all states in the great power system.

The closer the resulting concentration is to zero, the more evenly divided power is. The closer to 1, the more concentrated power is. There is a general but not strict correlation between concentration and polarity. It is rare to find a result over 0.5, but a result between 0.4 and 0.5 usually indicates a unipolar system, while a result between 0.2 and 0.4 usually indicated a bipolar or multipolar system. Concentration can be plotted over time, so that the fluctuations and trends in concentration can be observed. The military capability concentration was estimated at 0.267 for 2023. The global share of GDP (PPP) by the top two countries was 34% in 2025 according to the IMF.

== See also ==
- Balance of power (international relations)
- Bipolarisation
- Chinese Century
- Global policeman
- Global Swing States
- International monetary systems
- Non-Aligned Movement
- Pax Americana
- Pax Britannica
- Power (international relations)
- Posthegemony
- Regional hegemony
- Thucydides Trap

== Bibliography ==
- Thompson, William R. On Global War: Historical–Structural Approaches to World Politics. Columbia, SC: University of South Carolina Press, 1988, pp. 209–210.
