= Cornell University Press =

American university press

- Parent company: Cornell University
- Founded: 1869
- Country of origin: United States
- Headquarters location: Ithaca, New York, U.S.
- Distribution: Longleaf Services
- Publication types: Books
- Imprints: ILR Press
- Official website: cornellpress.cornell.edu

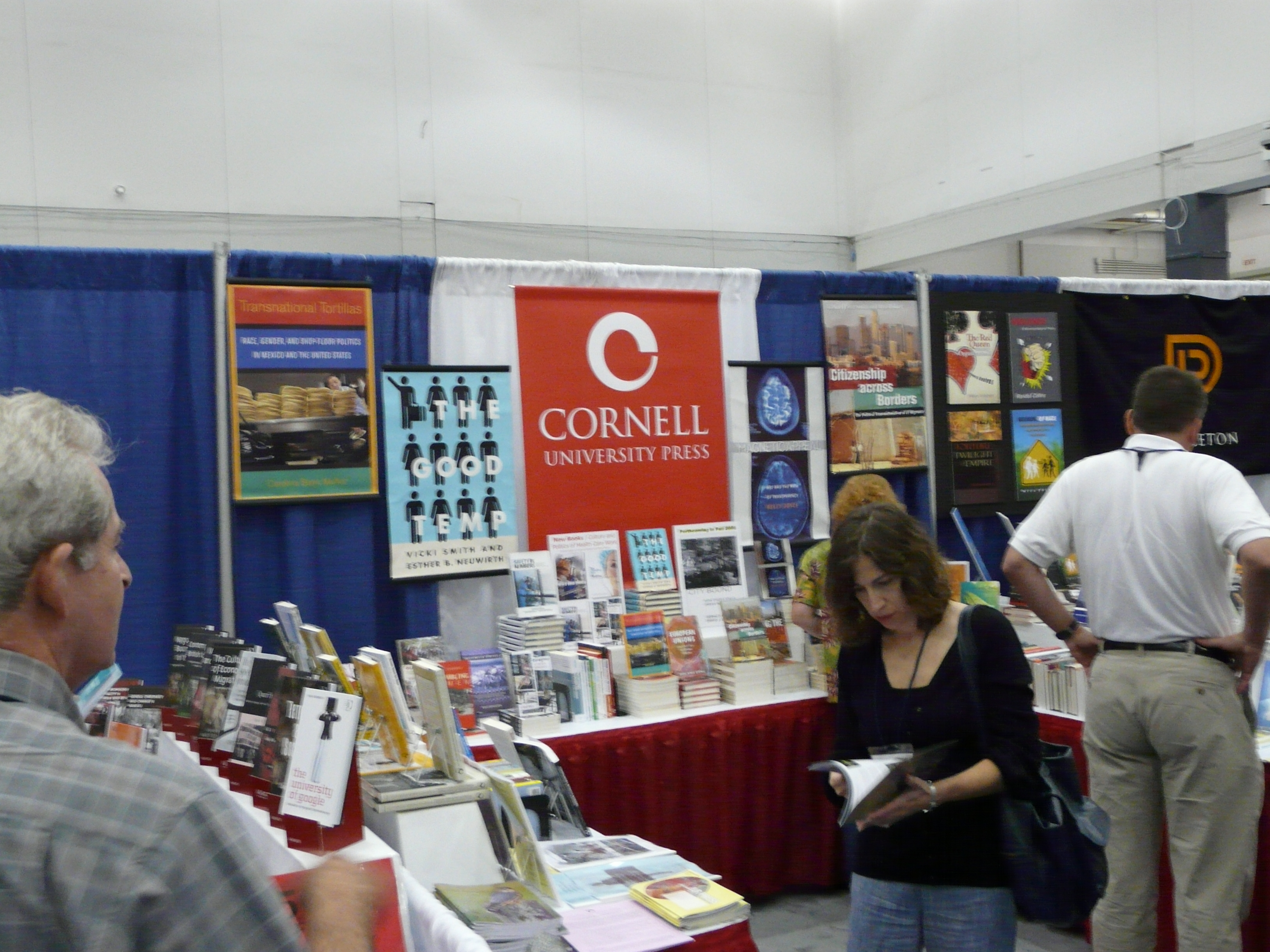
2008 conference booth

The Cornell University Press is the university press of Cornell University, an Ivy League university in Ithaca, New York. It is currently housed in Sage House, the former residence of Henry William Sage.

== Overview ==
The press is one of the country's largest university presses. It produces approximately 150 nonfiction titles each year in various disciplines, including anthropology, Asian studies, biological sciences, classics, history, industrial relations, literary criticism and theory, natural history, philosophy, politics and international relations, veterinary science, and women's studies. Although the press has been subsidized by the university for most of its history, it is now largely dependent on book sales to finance its operations.

Domestic distribution for the press is currently provided by the University of North Carolina Press's Longleaf Services.

== History ==
It was first established in 1869, making it the first university publishing enterprise in the United States, but was inactive from 1884 to 1930.

The press was established in the College of the Mechanic Arts, as mechanical engineering was called in the 19th century, because engineers knew more about running steam-powered printing presses than literature professors. Since its inception, The press has offered work-study financial aid: students with previous training in the printing trades were paid for typesetting and running the presses that printed textbooks, pamphlets, a weekly student journal, and official university publications.

In 1955 the press was the first university press to publish paperback books, this move being "quickly followed by other university presses". During the 1950s the press also published paperback series including Great Seal Books and Cornell Paperbacks.

In 2010, the Mellon Foundation, whose President Don Michael Randel is a former Cornell Provost, awarded to the press a $50,000 grant to explore new business models for publishing scholarly works in low-demand humanities subject areas. With this grant, a book series was published titled "Signale: Modern German Letters, Cultures, and Thoughts". Only 500 hard copies of each book in the series will be printed, with extra copies manufactured on demand once the original supply is depleted.

Other currently active series include "Expertise: Cultures and Technologies of Knowledge" and Police/Worlds: Studies in security, crime and governance.

== Notable books ==
- Alston, William (1991). Perceiving God: The Epistemology of Religious Experience. Cornell University Press. ISBN 978-0801481550.
- Avrich, Paul (1973). The Anarchists in the Russian Revolution. Cornell University Press. ISBN 978-0801407802.
- Bennett, Simon (1980). Mind and Madness in Ancient Greece. Cornell University Press. ISBN 9780801492020.
- Davis, David Brion (1966). The Problem of Slavery in Western Culture. Cornell University Press. ISBN 0-8014-0101-1.
- De Ste. Croix, Geoffrey Ernest Maurice (1981). The Class Struggle in the Ancient Greek World. Cornell University Press. ISBN 0-8014-1442-3.
- Hopgood, Stephen (2006). Keepers of the Flame: Understanding Amnesty International. Cornell University Press. ISBN 0-8014-4402-0.
- Morris, Charles J. (2005). The Blue Eagle at Work: Reclaiming Democratic Rights in the American Workplace. Cornell University Press. ISBN 0-8014-4317-2.
- Kang, Hildi (2001). Under the Black Umbrella: Voices From Colonial Korea, 1910-1945. Cornell University Press. ISBN 978-0801438547.
- Karpiak, Kevin; Mulla, Sameena; Garriott, William; Feldman, Ilana (eds.). Police/Worlds: Studies in Security, Crime and Governance.
- Kitamura, Hiroshi (2010). Screening Enlightenment: Hollywood and the Cultural Reconstruction of Defeated Japan. Cornell University Press. ISBN 9780801445996.
- Mills, Charles W. (1997). The Racial Contract. ISBN 978-0-8014-8463-6.
- Montefiore, Simon Sebag (2003). Stalin: The Court of the Red Tsar. ISBN 9781842127261.
- Posen, Barry (2014). Restraint: A New Foundation for U.S. Grand Strategy. ISBN 978-0-8014-7087-5.
- Reich, Simon (1990). The Fruits of Fascism: Postwar Prosperity in Historical Perspective. ISBN 0-8014-9729-9.
- Valentino, Benjamin (2003). Final Solutions: Mass Killing and Genocide in the 20th Century. Cornell University Press. ISBN 9780801439650.

== See also ==
- List of English-language book publishing companies
- List of university presses
