= Restraint (book) =

Book by Barry Posen

Restraint: A New Foundation for U.S. Grand Strategy
- First edition
- Author: Barry Posen
- Language: English
- Publisher: Cornell University Press
- Publication date: 2014
- Publication place: United States

Restraint: A New Foundation for U.S. Grand Strategy is a book that was written by Barry Posen and published in 2014 by Cornell University Press. Posen is the Ford International Professor of Political Science and director of the Security Studies Program at the Massachusetts Institute of Technology (MIT).

== Grand strategy ==
Posen defines grand strategy as "a state's 'theory about how to produce security for itself.'" Posen describes the current debate about American grand strategy as being between two main philosophies: liberal hegemony and restraint.

The first half of the book addresses liberal hegemony. Liberal hegemony is defined as "an activist grand strategy that aims to assertively maintain U.S. dominance and the 'unipolar moment' in the service of liberalism and national security," Posen argues that liberal hegemony is the grand strategy that the United States has followed since the end of the Cold War and that it has been a failure, calling it "unnecessary, counterproductive, costly, and wasteful."

In the second half of the book, Posen explains why restraint would be a better grand strategy to follow than liberal hegemony. He details what the strategy would look like and what sort of military would be needed to achieve this.

== Reception ==
Reviewer William Ruger, writing in The American Conservative, called the book the "defining treatise" for supporters of restraint. Another reviewer Jared Mckinney said "Restraint makes an eloquent case for a new grand strategy"

International relations scholars Hugo Meijer and Stephen G. Brooks have challenged Posen's claim that Europe will develop its own capable defense forces if the U.S. withdrew from Europe.
