= Simon Reich =

American academic

Simon Reich is a scholar best known for his work in international relations, human security, and grand strategy. He is a professor in the Division of Global Affairs at Rutgers University - Newark in Newark, New Jersey.

== Career ==
Reich is author, co-author, and editor of thirteen books. His most recent book is Across Type, Time and Space: American Grand Strategy in Comparative Perspective (co-authored with Peter Dombrowski). Other recent books include The End of Grand Strategy (co-authored with Peter Dombrowski) and Good-bye Hegemony! Power and Influence in the Global System (co-authored with Richard Ned Lebow). He is also the author of the book The Fruits of Fascism and The German Predicament.

Reich's career has included:

- 2008 - 2010: Director of the Division of Global Affairs at Rutgers University
- 2003 - 2008: Founded the Ford Institute for Human Security and served as Professor in the Graduate School of Public and International Affairs (1987 - 2008) at the University of Pittsburgh
- 2000 - 2001: Director of Research and Analysis at the Royal Institute of International Affairs (Chatham House) in London
- 1997 - 1998: President of the International Political Economy Section of the International Studies Association
- 1992 - 1994: US Congressional Office of Technology Assessment

Reich has been a frequent contributor on The Conversation and publishes online articles in Newsweek Magazine, Fortune Magazine, and Policy Forum. He is also often interviewed about current events on international radio programs and his work has been quoted in international newspapers and periodicals such as The New York Times, The Washington Post, The Christian Science Monitor, and the Detroit Free Press.

Reich currently holds appointments as a professor in the Division of Global Affairs and Department of Political Science at Rutgers Newark, and as a Chercheur Associé, at Le Centre de recherches internationales (CERI), Sciences Po (Paris)

== Personal life ==
Reich was raised in London and pursued his education in the United States. He earned his Ph.D. in the Department of Government at Cornell University in 1988. He is married to Ariane Chebel d'Appollonia, a French historian and political scientist who serves as a professor in the School of Public Affairs & Administration and the Division of Global Affairs at Rutgers University.

== Selected publications ==
- "The Strategy of Sponsorship" (co-authored with Peter Dombrowski), Survival (October/November 2015), Vol. 57, No. 5. 121–148.
- "American and Chinese Leadership during the Global Financial Crisis: Testing Kindleberger's Stabilization Functions" (co-authored with Carla Norrlöf), International Area Studies Review, March 2015. 1-23.
- Good-bye Hegemony! Power and Influence in the Global System (with Richard Ned Lebow). Princeton University Press. 2014.
- Global Norms, American Sponsorship and the Emerging Patterns of World Politics. Palgrave MacMillan. 2010.
- Managing Ethnic Diversity after 9/11: Integration, Security, and Civil Liberties in Transatlantic Perspective (co-edited with Ariane Chebel d'Appollonia). Rutgers University Press. 2011.
- Child Soldiers in the Age of Fractured States (co-edited with Scott Gates). University of Pittsburgh Press. 2009.
- Immigration, Integration and Security: America and Europe in Comparative Perspective (co-edited with Ariane Chebel d'Appollonia). University of Pittsburgh Press. 2008.
- Human Trafficking, Human Security and the Balkans (co-edited with H. Richard Friman). University of Pittsburgh Press. 2007.
- "Modell Deutschland and the New Europe". Telos 89 (Fall 1991). New York: Telos Press.
- The age of fuzzy bifurcation: Lessons from the pandemic and the Ukraine War. (with Richard Higgott). Global Policy, 13, 627–639.
