= Barry Posen =

American political scientist

Barry R. Posen
- Born: July 13, 1952 (age 74)
- Education: University of California, Berkeley; Occidental College
- Scientific career
- Fields: Political science
- Workplaces: Massachusetts Institute of Technology
- Doctoral advisor: Kenneth Waltz
- Doctoral students: Kenneth M. Pollack; Richard Wilcox

Barry Ross Posen (born July 13, 1952) is Ford International Professor of Political Science at MIT and the director of MIT's Security Studies Program. An expert in the field of security studies, he currently serves on the editorial boards of the journals International Security and Security Studies and is a member of the Council on Foreign Relations and served as a study group member for the Hart-Rudman Commission. Posen is a structural realist.

Posen received his B.A. from Occidental College in 1974 and his M.A. and PhD, under Kenneth Waltz, from the University of California, Berkeley in 1976 and 1981 respectively. Posen worked as a consultant for the RAND Corporation and an analyst for the Department of Defense and Center for Strategic and International Studies before becoming an assistant professor of political science at Princeton University in 1984. In 1987, he joined MIT as associate professor of political science and has taught at MIT since that time. He has also served as a consultant to the Woodrow Wilson Center, The Christian Science Monitor and the MacArthur Foundation.

Posen is the author of three books. Posen has also published a number of highly influential journal articles, including "The Security Dilemma and Ethnic Conflict" and "Command of the Commons: The Military Foundations of U.S. Hegemony." In addition to his scholarly work, Posen has frequently appeared in the media and published general interest articles in publications including The New York Times, The Boston Globe, and The American Interest.

Barry Posen is not closely related to the American economist Adam Posen, although their last name has the same origin from the city of Poznań in Poland.

== Publications ==
=== The Sources of Military Doctrine ===
Posen's first book, The Sources of Military Doctrine: France, Britain, and Germany Between the World Wars, was published by Cornell University Press in 1984. The Sources of Military Doctrine focuses on how military doctrine is formed and how it shapes grand strategy. The book won the 1984 Edgar S. Furniss Book Award from the Mershon Center for International Security Studies and the 1985 Woodrow Wilson Foundation Award, given annually by the American Political Science Association to the "best book on government, politics or international affairs."

=== Inadvertent Escalation ===
Posen's second book is Inadvertent Escalation: Conventional War and Nuclear Risks, which was published by Cornell University Press in 1991.

=== Restraint ===
Posen's third book is Restraint: A New Foundation for U.S. Grand Strategy, which was published as part of the Cornell Studies in Security Affairs series in 2014. The book is about two competing American grand strategies: liberal hegemony (which Posen opposes) and restraint (which Posen supports). Restraint contains Posen's critique of liberal hegemony and his explanation for why restraint is a superior grand strategy.

Reviewer William Ruger, writing in The American Conservative, called the book the "defining treatise" for supporters of restraint.

=== Putin's Preventive War: The 2022 Invasion of Ukraine ===
In his 2025 article Prof. Posen basically agrees with Prof. John Mearsheimer and with radio host Scott Horton, that the Russian invasion of Ukraine was a preventive war aimed to forestall Ukraine's admission into NATO, which could have been followed by placing nuclear-tipped cruise missiles too close to the Russian heartland to be defended from. Posen, like other analysts, draws parallels between the Cuban Missile Crisis of 1962 and the Russian Invasion of Ukraine of 2022.

== Selected publications ==
- Posen, Barry R. (2025-09-03). "European Military Autonomy: What Comes First?". Survival. 67 (5): 7–28. doi:10.1080/00396338.2025.2561479. ISSN 0039-6338.
- Posen, Barry R. (2025-02-01). "Putin's Preventive War: The 2022 Invasion of Ukraine". International Security. 49 (3): 7–49. doi:10.1162/isec_a_00501. ISSN 0162-2889.
- Posen B. Hypotheses on the implications of the Ukraine-Russia war. Defense Priorities; 2022.
- Posen, Barry R. (2021-09-03). "A new transatlantic division of labor could save billions every year!". Bulletin of the Atomic Scientists. 77 (5): 239–243. doi:10.1080/00963402.2021.1964223}. ISSN 0096-3402.
- Posen, Barry R. (2020-11-01). "Europe Can Defend Itself". Survival. 62 (6): 7–34. doi:10.1080/00396338.2020.1851080. ISSN 0039-6338.
- Posen, Barry R. (2019-03-11), Feldman, Shai; Levite, Ariel (eds.), "Military Lessons of the Gulf War-Implications for Middle East Arms Control", Arms Control and the New Middle East Security Environment (1 ed.), Routledge, pp. 61–77, doi:10.4324/9780429039119-3, ISBN 978-0-429-03911-9, retrieved 2025-11-22
- Posen, Barry R. (2019-03-04), Dunn, Keith A.; Staudenmaier, William O. (eds.), "Competing Views of the Central Region Conventional Balance", Alternative Military Strategies for the Future (1 ed.), Routledge, pp. 87–132, doi:10.4324/9780429035135-5, ISBN 978-0-429-03513-5, retrieved 2025-11-22
- "1. The Perils of Liberal Hegemony", Restraint, Cornell University Press, pp. 24–68, 2018-12-31, doi:10.7591/9780801470875-005, ISBN 978-0-8014-7087-5, retrieved 2025-11-22
- Posen, Barry R. (2017-12-31). Inadvertent Escalation: Conventional War and Nuclear Risks. Cornell University Press. doi:10.7591/9780801468384. ISBN 978-0-8014-6838-4.
- Posen, Barry R. (2009-11-01). "Emerging Multipolarity: Why Should We Care?". Current History. 108 (721): 347–352. doi:10.1525/curh.2009.108.721.347. | 0011-3530.
- "Opinion | Fighting Blind in Iraq (Published 2005)". 2005-06-07. Retrieved 2025-11-22.
- Posen, Barry R. (2004-01). "ESDP and the structure of world power". The International Spectator. 39 (1): 5–17. doi:10.1080/03932720408457057. ISSN 0393-2729.
- Posen, Barry R. (2002-01). "The Struggle against Terrorism: Grand Strategy, Strategy, and Tactics". International Security. 26 (3): 39–55. doi:10.1162/016228801753399709. ISSN 0162-2889.
- Zelikow, Philip; Posen, Barry (2000). "The War for Kosovo: Serbia's Political-Military Strategy". Foreign Affairs. 79 (4): 155. doi:10.2307/20049850.
- Posen, Barry R.; Ross, Andrew L. (1997-01). "Competing Visions for U.S. Grand Strategy". International Security. 21 (3): 5–53. doi:10.1162/isec.21.3.5. ISSN 0162-2889.
- Posen, Barry R. (1988-12-31), Miller, Steven E.; Van Evera, Stephen (eds.), "Inadvertent Nuclear War?: Escalation and NATO's Northern Flank", Naval Strategy and National Security, Princeton University Press, pp. 332–358, doi:10.1515/9781400859528.332, ISBN 978-1-4008-5952-8, retrieved 2025-11-22
- Posen, Barry R. (1987-07). "Competing Images of the Soviet Union". World Politics. 39 (4): 579–597. doi:10.2307/2010293. ISSN 0043-8871.
- Posen, Barry R.; van Evera, Stephen W. (23/1980). "Overarming and Underwhelming". Foreign Policy (40): 99. doi:10.2307/1148343.
- A New Transatlantic Division of Labor could save Billions every year! by Barry Posen
- The Transatlantic Relationship: Radical reform is in the U.S. National Interest by Barry Posen
- Europe can defend itself by Barry Posen
- Civil Wars & the Structure of World Power by Barry Posen
- "We can Live With a Nuclear Iran" by Barry Posen in The New York Times
- Putin's Preventive War: The 2022 Invasion of Ukraine by Barry Posen
