= Bipolarisation =

Bipolarisation or bipolarization (American English) in politics, is a state where forces are organized around two rival powers, neither of which can dominate the other. Its application as a model for international relations has given rise to divergent analyses.

== International politics ==
The term bipolarization was used to describe the division of the world during the Cold War (1947–1991) between the communist Eastern Bloc, centred on the USSR, and the capitalist Western Bloc. It also defines the state of international relations during this period, dominated by the confrontation between two superpowers, the United States against the USSR, and more broadly, between NATO and the Warsaw Pact.

This division of the world between two poles was contested by the Non-Aligned Movement, which emerged from the Bandung Conference in 1955.

Some analysts believe that after the fall of the Berlin Wall in 1989 and the collapse of the USSR in 1991, the bipolar system that emerged from the Cold War was replaced by a relatively unipolar system dominated by the hyperpower of the United States, a situation considered positive by the leaders of the United States and the United Kingdom who identify with the Western pole but criticized by French leaders who sought to assert a multipolar conception.

However, the hegemony of the American pole is not very sustainable and, during the 2000s, would give way to a multipolar world sometimes described as chaotic where the powers fail to establish stable relations.

In the 2010s, this relatively multipolar system would evolve into a flexible bipolar system where the People's Republic of China would appear as a potential superpower alongside the United States.

== Domestic policy ==
Bipolarisation goes against "political pluralism" in the sense that the political field would be contested by several forces of comparable importance rather than by two main forces. It is often associated with bipartisanship. Used in analyses of party systems, the term bipolarization implies both an evolution (transition from the "non-bipolar" state to the "bipolar" state) and a type of system in which the multiparty system is gradually organized into two coalitions, that is to say, into a bipolar system.

At the state level, it refers to the grouping of political forces between two main camps, for example, in the United States, between the Democratic Party and the Republican Party, or in France between the left and the right. In France, bipolarisation is particularly important in a triangular election, alongside tripolarisation.

== See also ==
- Political polarization – Divergence of political attitudes
