= Ariane Chebel d'Appollonia =

French historian

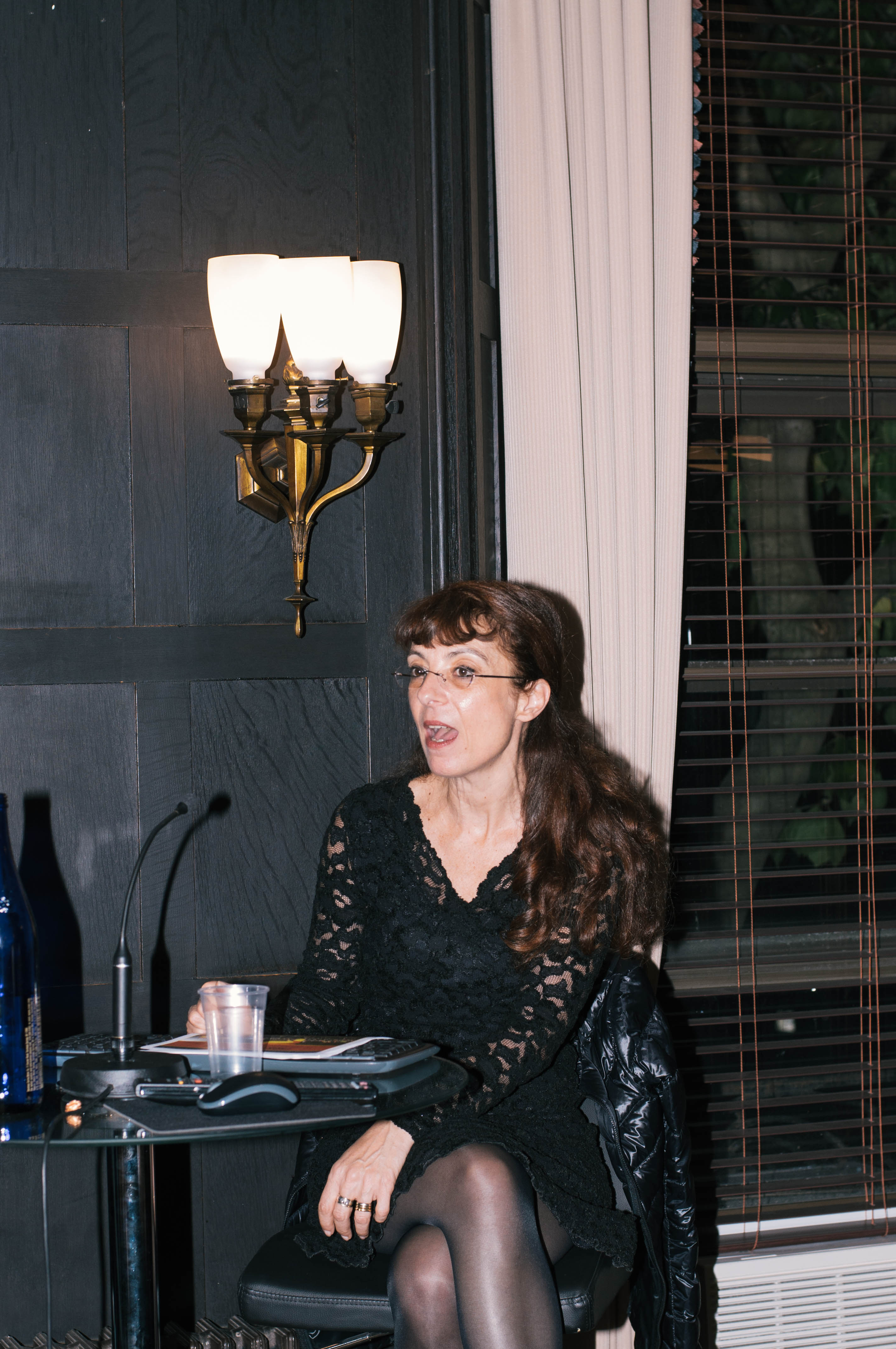
- Born: October 6, 1962 (age 63)
- Occupations: Professor, Rutgers University
- Known for: Ethics, Political Science, Security Studies

Ariane Chebel d'Appollonia (born October 6, 1962) is a French-American ethicist, historian, and political scientist best known for her research on immigration and security studies. She is a professor at the School of Public Affairs and Administration (SPAA) and the Division of Global Affairs at Rutgers University - Newark.

== Biography ==
Chebel d'Appollonia earned her PhD with highest distinction from the Institut d'Etudes Politiques de Paris (Sciences Po) in Paris, France in 1993. She also earned a Post-Master's Degree in Political Science (1985) and a Post-Master's Degree in Contemporary History (1986) from Sciences Po.

She is married to British-American scholar Simon Reich, who teaches in the Division of Global Affairs at Rutgers University - Newark. They have published several books together, including Managing Ethnic Diversity After 9/11: Integration, Security and Civil Liberties in Transatlantic Perspective (Rutgers University Press, 2010) and Immigration, Integration and Security: America and Europe in Comparative Perspective (University of Pittsburgh Press, 2008).

== Career ==
Chebel d'Appollonia collaborated on the first part of a 1999 documentary titled Histoire d'une droite extrême on the extreme right wing in France, which was directed by William Karel.

Since 2009 she has held an appointment as a professor in the School of Public Affairs and Administration as well as the Division of Global Affairs at Rutgers University - Newark.

She is the author and editor of at least eight books and has published over forty articles.
