= Perceiving God =

1991 book by William Alston

- Cover
- Author: William Alston
- Language: English
- Subject: Philosophy of religion
- Publisher: Cornell University Press
- Publication date: 1991
- Publication place: United States
- Media type: Print (Hardcover and Paperback)
- Pages: 336
- ISBN: 978-0801481550

Perceiving God: The Epistemology of Religious Experience is a 1991 book about the philosophy of religion by the philosopher William Alston, in which the author discusses experiential awareness of God. The book was first published in the United States by Cornell University Press. The book received positive reviews and has been described as an important, well-argued, and seminal work. However, Alston was criticized for his treatment of the conflict between the competing claims made by different religions.

== Summary ==
Alston writes that his central thesis is that "experiential awareness of God ... makes an important contribution to the grounds of religious belief." He uses the term "mystical perception" to refer to "putative direct experiential awareness of God." He builds on work by the philosophers Thomas Reid and Ludwig Wittgenstein, and also refers to the work of the philosopher William James. He criticizes the work of the philosopher Wayne Proudfoot, arguing that Proudfoot wrongly construes "mystical experience" as comprising "purely subjective feelings or sensations" combined with an explanation according to which they are due to an agent such as God.

== Publication history ==
Perceiving God was first published by Cornell University Press in 1991. It was published by Cornell Paperbacks in 1993.

== Reception ==
Perceiving God received positive reviews from Terrence W. Tilley in Theological Studies, Brian Hebblethwaite in Modern Theology, the philosopher Keith Ward in Philosophy, Patrick Sherry in Religion, Proudfoot in the Journal of the American Academy of Religion, and Matthias Steup in Noûs, and a mixed review from John F. Post in The Journal of Religion. The book was also discussed by Thomas W. Smythe in Theology Today. In Religious Studies, the book was discussed by Adam Green and Joshua Seigal. In International Journal for Philosophy of Religion, the book received a positive review from the philosopher William Hasker, and was also discussed by Rene Van Woudenberg and by T. Mawson.

Tilley described the book as "arguably the most important investigation of the epistemology of mysticism from a sophisticated analytical-pragmatic perspective" since James's The Varieties of Religious Experience (1902), and essential reading for theologians and philosophers of religion. He considered Alston's argument "elegant and comprehensive", but concluded that it did not ultimately warrant conclusions stronger than those of James, and found it unclear who Alston intended to convince. Nevertheless, he credited Alston with clarifying the issues involved in the justification of religious belief. Hebblethwaite, writing in 1994, described the book as "one of the most important philosophy of religion books to have been published during the last fifteen years". He considered it regrettable that it had received a hostile response from theologians. He praised Alston's discussion of Wittgenstein's epistemology. He criticized Alston's use of the term "mystical perception" to refer to "experiential awareness of God's being or action", arguing that it was potentially confusing. However, he believed that Alston succeeded in demonstrating that mystical perception and sense perception suffer from similar limitations.

Ward wrote that the book was "of the first importance in its field" and would make a useful text for "discussions of topics in epistemology generally and in religion." He credited Alston with helping to "place analytical philosophy of religion in a central role in contemporary philosophy", arguing with "great logical and analytical force", and successfully countering the "over-easy dismissal" of religious experience as a "purely subjective phenomenon". However, he noted that Alston's arguments were contentious, and had reservations about Alston's attempt to base abstract theological beliefs on direct perceptions of God. Sherry described the book as an important work that was the product of much thought and deserved the attention of all philosophers of religion. However, he criticized Alston's treatment of the "apparent conflict between religious experiences in different religions".

Proudfoot credited Alston with providing a "careful study of the epistemic status of claims for a direct awareness of God." However, while he believed the work showed "impressive analytical precision", he found Alston's model of perception and perceptual justification "naive with respect to actual procedures of belief revision". Steup described the book as "terrific" and an example of the "best contemporary epistemology has to offer". He credited Alston with "sharp insights and illuminating argumentative twists." However, he believed that there were problems with Alston's main argument. Post described the book as "redoubtable", and praised Alston's argument that awareness of God is direct in the same way that sense perception of objects is direct. However, he criticized Alton's epistemological position, believing that it needed a better defense than Alston provided, as well as Alston's conceptual analysis, and his treatment of the issues created by the conflicting claims of different religions. Smythe defended Alston's views, arguing that the idea that "there is a nonsensory perceptual awareness of God that provides grounds for religious belief" should be taken seriously.

Green argued that mystical experience should be characterized in terms of "shared attention", which "occurs when one is engaged in an act of attending to something and in doing so one is consciously coordinating with another on what both will attend to", rather than compared to sense perception. Seigal described Perceiving God as a "seminal book". He argued that there is a tension between Alston's thesis "that beliefs about God formed on the basis of mystical perception are prima facie justified" and "a currently popular method for disarming a certain form of the argument from evil". Hasker credited Alston with developing his arguments with "great care and attention to detail." He predicted that Perceiving God would "set the standard for the discussion of its topic for at least the next several years." He believed that it "advances well beyond previous work on the subject, including Alston's own previously published writings" and "offers a wealth of careful analyses, compelling arguments, and forceful claims which will take epistemologists of religion a considerable time to assimilate." Van Woudenberg endorsed Alston's criticism of Proudfoot. However, he argued that from his criticism of Proudfoot, Alston drew the unjustified conclusion that perceiving a "subjective feeling sensation" as something plays no role in religious experience. He also criticized Alston's account of perception. Nevertheless, he concluded that the shortcomings of Alston's theory of perception did not undermine Alston's "overall project". Mawson described the book as "seminal".

The philosopher Alvin Plantinga praised the book, writing that, alongside Divine Nature and Human Language (1999), it was one of Alston's chief works in the philosophy of religion.
