= Under the Black Umbrella =

2001 book by Hildi Kang

- Author: Hildi Kang
- Publisher: Cornell University Press
- Publication date: 2001

Under the Black Umbrella: Voices From Colonial Korea, 1910-1945 is a book by writer Hildi Kang published by Cornell University Press in 2001. It shows a general snapshot of feelings towards the Japanese many years after the colonization of Korea.
