= Nuno P. Monteiro =

Portuguese professor (1971–2021)

Nuno P. Monteiro (1971 – May 5, 2021) was a Portuguese-American political scientist. He was Associate Professor of Political Science at Yale University. He was known for his research within the fields of International Relations and Security Studies, in particular on the topics of unipolarity and nuclear weapons.

He was the author of the books Theory of Unipolar Politics and Nuclear Politics: The Strategic Causes of Proliferation (co-authored with Alexandre Debs).

He received a B.A. from the University of Minho, Portugal, and a PhD in Political Science from the University of Chicago under the supervision of John Mearsheimer. Monteiro died on May 5, 2021.
