= Triangular election in France =

Runoff election process

The triangular election (French: élection triangulaire) is a characteristic of the French electoral system as a consequence of the country's two-round voting system for elections to the National Assembly. Such a triangular election occurs when three candidates from the first round have reached the retention threshold, and none of them withdraws from the second round. The winner of this election is determined by a relative majority. Depending on the elimination thresholds adopted for the first round, the second round may also give rise to a quadrangular election (4) or even a quinquangular (5) or sexangular election (6).

A particularly notable triangular election took place during the 2024 French legislative election between the Ensemble pour la République, New Popular Front, and the Union of the Far-Right.

== Origins ==
The first triangular elections appeared with the establishment of the two-round majority single-member constituency system. This electoral system was put in place during the legislative elections of 1852, and then kept during the Second French Empire and the French Third Republic, from the elections of 1876.

This voting method was originally considered favourable to the Legitimists, Orleanists, and Bonapartists, three political movements of the French right wing who suffered from division. Indeed, in the case of an incomplete bipolarisation of the vote, where a divided bloc withdraws in favour of the best of them during the second round, the triangular configuration is then more favourable to the political camp which has two qualified candidates.

This election system influences the politics of France more generally, as in order to be represented in the National Assembly without being able to win alone, you must have the support of other parties, in theory making the result more representative .

== In various elections ==
The occurrence of triangular races depends on the voting method of the elections, and more particularly on the qualification threshold for the second round.

- Triangular elections occur less and less often during legislative elections which elects deputies to the National Assembly, where it is necessary to obtain at least 12.5% of registered voters to be able to stay in the race (in a case where two other candidates have also crossed the 12.5% threshold). A notable exception to this trend was the 2024 Legislative Election, where a record 306 triangulars were observed in a tight race between three electoral coalitions.
- Triangular elections never occur during a presidential election, as the runoff only takes place between the top two candidates. However, the French Constitution allows withdrawal in favour of another candidate, which does not prevent strategies inspired by legislative elections.
- Triangular elections have become rarer in departmental elections as well because successive French governments have repeatedly raised the threshold for remaining in the second round, to their own advantage, this now being placed at 12.5% of registered voters.
- In municipal elections, since 1983 half of the seats have been distributed proportionally, but there has been a threshold for access to the second round in towns with more than 1,000 inhabitants. This is set at 10% of the votes cast, thus creating a potential for triangular and quadrangular races in politically divided municipalities.
- In regional elections there was previously only a single round, but a 2003 reform copied the municipal system, with a threshold for access to the second round of 10% of the votes cast, which gave rise to numerous three-way contests in 2004, 2010 and 2015.

== Number of triangular elections ==
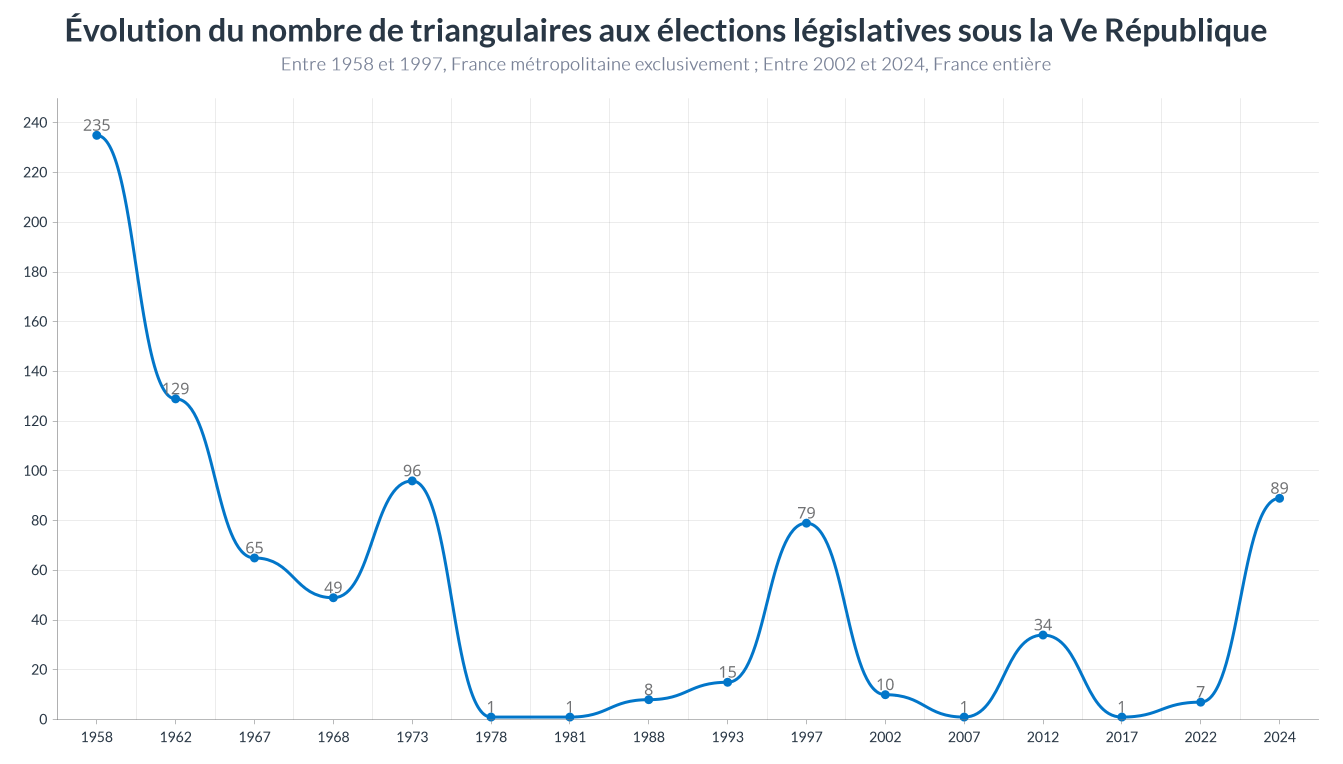
Development in the number of triangular contests in legislative elections during the Fifth French Republic

=== Legislative elections ===
Election	Number	Notes	Reference
1958	235		
1962	129		
1967	65		
1968	49		
1973	96		
1978	1		
1981	1		
1986	0	single-round proportional voting (no three-way race possible)	
1988	8		
1993	15		
1997	79	105 before withdrawals	
2002	10		
2007	1	12 before withdrawals	
2012	34	46 before withdrawals	
2017	1		
2022	7	8 before withdrawals	
2024	89	306 before withdrawals	

=== Regional elections ===
In the 2021 French regional elections there were several run-offs, with the second round preventing the National Rally from winning any regions.

== Influencing factors ==
The number of three-way races per decade in various elections has never stabilised around any value. This is because of many influencing factors, sometimes favouring three-way races, sometimes causing the number of second rounds with more than two candidates to fall.

=== The percentile threshold to be a candidate in the second round ===
==== Threshold ====
The higher the election threshold required to qualify for the second round, the fewer candidates there will be who will reach the second round and therefore the fewer three-way races.

==== Development over time ====
The 12.5% threshold has not always been the same.

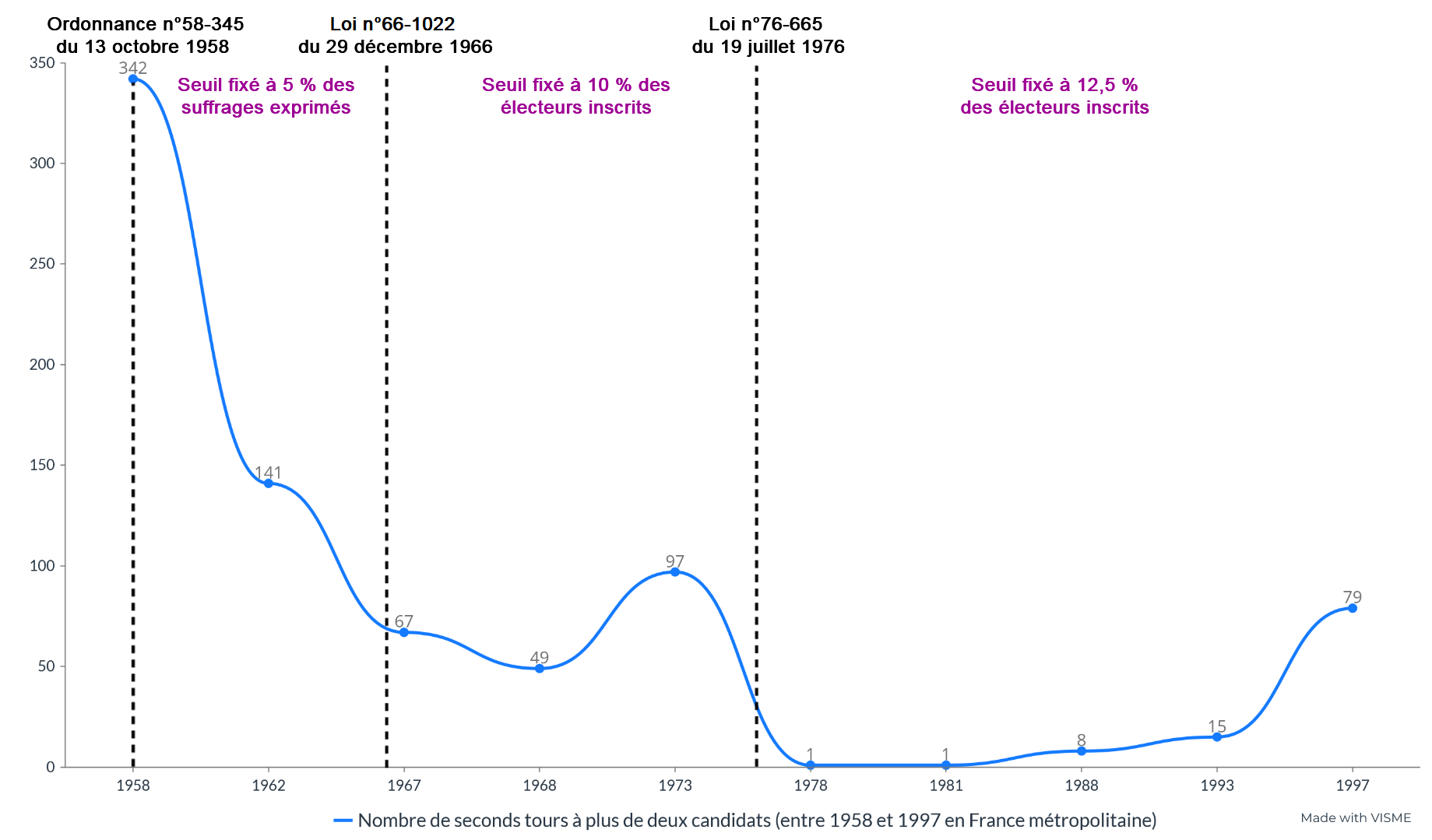
The minimum threshold to be a candidate for the legislative elections has been adjusted (1958–1997). The number of second rounds with more than two candidates collapses each time the threshold is raised.

- Following ordinances of 1958 and 1959 which re-established among other things the two-round system, the threshold was 5%.
- With law number 66-1022 of 1966 the threshold changed to 10%.
- With law number 76-665 of 1976 the threshold changed to 12.5%, where it remained as of 2024.

There were no more sexangular or quinquangular elections after the threshold change of 1966, and the number of quadrangular elections also shrank drastically.

==== Percentage of registered or of expressed ====
If the threshold for remaining in the second round is a percentage of votes cast, which is the case for regional elections and municipal elections for municipalities with more than 1,000 inhabitants, then it is easier for a list or for a candidate to succeed in crossing this threshold, because too low a turnout would have no influence on the election.

Indeed, in the case of departmental elections and legislative elections where a percentage threshold of registered voters is in force, candidates wishing to qualify for the second round are dependent on abstention.

=== Voter turnout ===
The voter turnout is a significant factor influencing the number of three-way races in departmental elections and legislative elections.

In the context of a 12.5% threshold of registered voters, for three candidates to qualify, the third must also win at least one eighth of the votes of registered voters. But this assumes that at least three eighths (37.5%) of registered voters go to the polls. Thus, a high abstention rate precludes any three-way race in the second round. The higher the turnout, the more it favours the possibility of there being a triangular election.

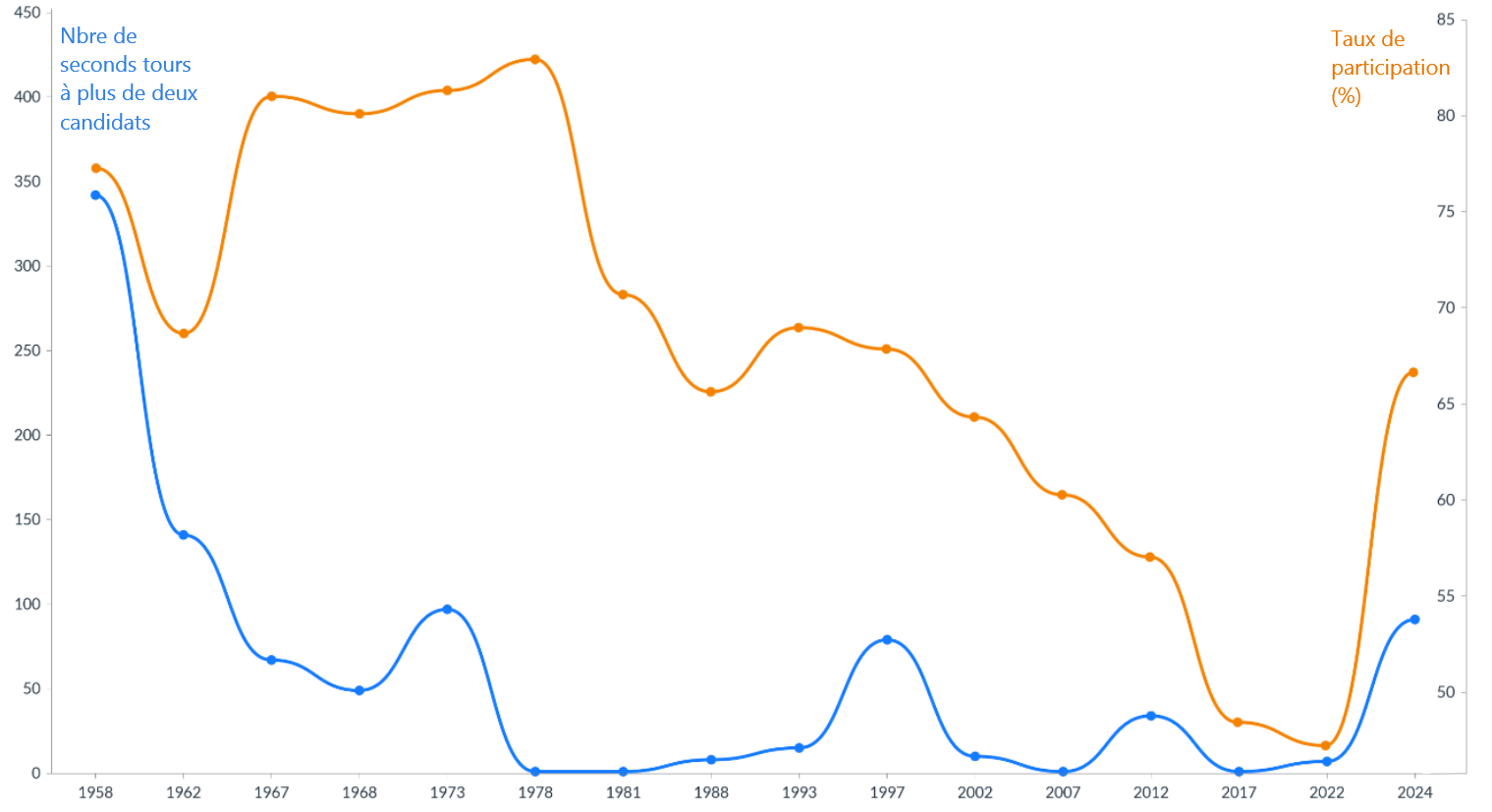
No correlation between voter turnout and the number of second rounds with more than two candidates is evident.

However, when comparing historical statistics of the participation rate and the number of second rounds with more than two candidates during the legislative elections under the Fifth Republic, no correlation is evident.

The graph demonstrates two things:

- Turnout must be high enough to have many second rounds with more than two candidates (1958; 1962; 1973; 1997 and 2024)
- On the other hand, if participation is very high, this does not necessarily imply a large number of second rounds with more than two candidates (1978; 1981; 1993)

=== Bipolarization and tripolarization ===
Another factor influencing the number of triangular races is the presence of partisanship, which in France is known as bipolarisation or tripolarisation.

To better understand the subject, here are some historical explanations concerning the influence of these phenomena on French parliamentary life between 1958 and 1997:

- Before 1970 there were not, strictly speaking, two major political forces in opposition. Indeed, the SFIO (then the FGDS) Socialists and the PCF Communists never stood down to help each other, although both parties were left-wing. Similarly, the currents ranging from the radicals to the moderate right opposed the candidates of the Gaullist party. A form of multi-party democracy dominated at that time.
- A bipolarization of parliamentary life was, on the other hand, fully evident between the elections of 1978 and 1986. Indeed, during this period, we find two large coalitions alternating in power: the Right (composed of the RPR and the UDF) and the Left (composed of the Socialists and the Communists).
- But from the 1986 elections, Jean-Marie Le Pen's National Front began to gain momentum in legislative elections. More particularly in 1997, his party made a fairly significant breakthrough. Although the FN's score was respectable in the first round, it won very few seats in the National Assembly, in particular because of withdrawals intended to form a "Republican Front" against the extreme right. This was not true tripolarization, because Le Pen's party had too little presence in the chamber, but it did entail the rise of a third camp in French political life.

The relationship between bipolarization, tripolarization and the number of second rounds is therefore as follows:

In the event of bipolarization, voters shift massively to two political camps, in a more or less balanced way. In this situation, other candidates will then receive very few votes: in general, they will not reach the threshold for the second round. Bipolarization thus favours duels between two parties.

On the other hand, in the event of tripolarization, the votes of the French are distributed among three political groups, again in a more or less balanced way. Thus, in this situation and with a fairly good turnout, three candidates will remain into the second round. Tripolarization thus favours triangular elections.

When superimposing this influence factor on the curve of second rounds with more than two candidates during the legislative elections (1958-1997), the correlation is stronger.

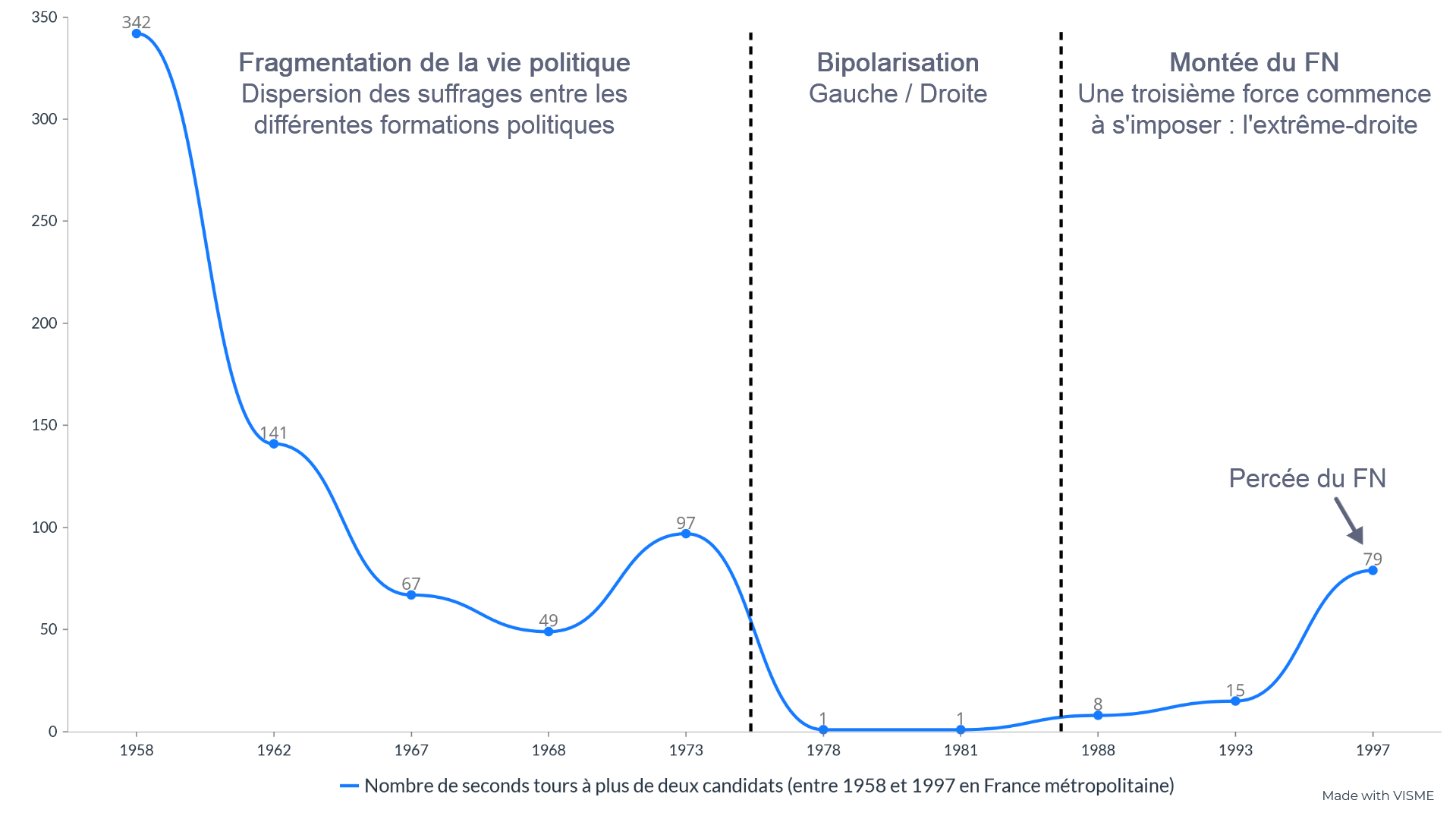
Influence of bipolarization, tripolarization and multiparty-ism on the number of 2nd rounds in French legislative elections (period 1958 - 1997)

- During the period when multipartyism dominated, many second rounds took place with more than two candidates. Also, in particular we see quadrangular, quinquangular and sexangular vote: this would not happen again during the quarter-century after the 1973 elections, the last one characterised by multipartyism.
- During the period of bipolarization, the number of triangular races collapsed to a single occurrence in each election.
- Finally, as the National Front began to gain momentum around 1986, the number of second rounds with more than two candidates rose again, reaching a fairly high figure in 1997. Indeed, during these elections, FN made a breakthrough: the number of three-way contests peaked at 79 (105 before withdrawals).

=== Withdrawals ===
A final crucial factor in understanding the number of triangular elections is withdrawal from the second round.

In the case 2024 French legislative election, 89 triangular races were recorded. This number represents only ten more than in the 1997 French legislative election, in a context where the National Front collected far fewer votes than the National Rally, and where the tripolarization of French political was similar to 2024. This was because before withdrawals, the number of three-way races was 306, a figure more in line with the context of tripolarization and high participation at the time. In the end, no less than two thirds of the three-way races were cancelled because candidates withdrew. The reason was that while the National Rally came out on top in the first round in many constituencies, the presidential majority and the new popular front withdrew their candidates who came in third place, in order to block the extreme right and form a "Republican Front". This practice of withdrawing the least well-placed candidates to prevent the first from winning the election was known before, but in a much less widespread manner.

=== Synthesis ===
To summarize the factors impacting the number of triangular elections and their influence, here is a summary table:

Influencing factor	Nature of influence
Minimum threshold required to qualify for the 2nd round in % of votes cast	increase
Minimum threshold required to qualify for the 2nd round in % of registered voters	decrease
Lowered threshold required to qualify for the 2nd round	increase
Raised threshold required to qualify for the 2nd round	decrease
High turnout	increase*
Low turnour	decrease*
Bipolarisation	decrease
Tripolarisation or multipartyism	increase
Withdrawals	decrease

*Note that in the case of regional and municipal elections (of more than 1000 inhabitants) where the retention threshold is calculated from the number of votes cast, the participation rate has no influence on the number of three-way races.
