= Police/Worlds: Studies in Security, Crime and Governance =

Series of monographs

Police/Worlds: Studies in Security, Crime and Governance is a monograph series under the imprint of Cornell University Press. It is edited by Kevin Karpiak, Sameena Mulla, William Garriott, and Ilana Feldman; its acquisitions editor is Jim Lance.

== Description ==
It has as its goal to find and publish manuscripts that "develop new conceptual, aesthetic and critical insights into policing that can push debates—and, ultimately, ways of addressing social problems—beyond existing works in police studies, criminology and anthropology".

As of October 2025, the series consists of eleven published monographs: Sentiment, Reason, and Law: Policing in the Republic of China on Taiwan by Jeffrey T. Martin (2019); Policing the Frontier: An Ethnography of Two Worlds in Niger by Mirco Göpfert (2020); and Black Lives and Spatial Matters: Policing Blackness and Practicing Freedom in Suburban St. Louis by Jodi Rios (2020); From Family to Police Force Security and Belonging on a South Asian Border by Farhana Ibrahim (2021); Police, Provocation, Politics: Counterinsurgency in Istanbul by Deniz Yonucu (2022); Unmaking Migrants: Nigeria's Campaign to End Human Trafficking by Stacey Vanderhurst (2022).; The Sensation of Security: Private Guards and Social Order in Brazil by Erika Robb Larkins (2023); Criminalizing the Casbahs: Policing North Africans in Marseille and Algiers, 1918–1954 by Danielle Beaujon (2025); and Bracketed Belonging: Gurkha Migrant Warriors and Transnational Lives by Kelvin E. Y. Low (2025).
