= Stephen G. Brooks =

American political scientist (born 1971)

Stephen Gallup Brooks (born 1971) is an American political scientist. He is currently professor of government in the Department of Government at Dartmouth College.

== Academic career ==
Brooks holds a BA from the University of California, Santa Cruz and a PhD from Yale University. He has taught at Dartmouth College since 2001. Brooks is well known in the international relations field for his contributions to international political economy and American grand strategy. Along with William Wohlforth, he has authored a number of articles related to American foreign policy and has advocated for continued American primacy around the world.

== Selected works ==
=== Books ===
- America Abroad: The United States’ Global Role in the 21 st Century (Oxford, 2016) (with William Wohlforth)
- World Out of Balance: International Relations and the Challenge of American Primacy (Princeton University Press, 2008) (with William Wohlforth)
- Producing Security: Multinational Corporations, Globalization, and the Changing Calculus of Conflict, Princeton University Press, 2005.

=== Articles ===
- The Long Unipolar Moment? Joshua Shifrinson, Anne-Marie Slaughter, and others debate American dominance. Foreign Affairs, (November/December 2023)
- “The Myth of Multipolarity: American Power’s Staying Power,” Foreign Affairs, Vol. 102, No. 3 (May/June 2023), with William Wohlforth
- “Why China Won’t Overtake the United States,” in Art, Jervis and Crawford, eds., International Politics: Enduring Concepts and Contemporary Issues (London: Rowman & Littlefield, 2023), with William Wohlforth
- “Europe Cannot Defend Itself: The Challenge of Pooling Military Power,” Survival, Vol. 63, No.1 (2021), with Hugo Meijer, pp. 33-40.
- "Power Transitions, then and now: Five new structural barriers that will constrain China’s rise," China International Strategy Review, Vol. 1, 2019.
- Roundtable on "America Abroad: The United States’ Global Role in the 21st Century" H-Diplo, (2018)
- “Assessing the Scope of U.S. Security Commitments in Asia,” Asia Policy, Vol. 13, No. 3 (July 2018), pp. 144-149.
- “Distinguishing a Minimalist Role for Grand Theorizing,” International Relations, Vol. 31, No.1 (March 2017), pp. 85-90.
- “Can We Identify a Benevolent Hegemon?” Cambridge Review of International Affairs, Vol. 25, No. 1 (2012), pp. 27-38.
- “US Decline or Primacy?” with William Wohlforth. In US Foreign Policy, Michael Cox and Doug Stokes, editors (Oxford University Press, 2012)
- “Assessing the Balance,” Cambridge Review of International Affairs, Vol. 42, No. 2, pp. 201-219 (July 2011), with William Wohlforth
- Roundtable on World Out of Balance: International Relations and the Challenge of American Primacy," H-Diplo, (2009)
- “Reflections on Producing Security,” Security Studies, Vol. 16, No. 4 (Winter 2008)
- “Clarifying the End of Cold War Debate,” Cold War History, Vol. 7, No. 3 (August 2007), pp.447-454, with William Wohlforth
- "Economic Constraints and the Turn Toward Superpower Cooperation in the 1980s," with William C. Wohlforth, in From Conflict Escalation to Conflict Transformation: The Cold War in the 1980s, Olav Njnillstad, ed., Frank Cass, 2004.
- "Economic Constraints and the End of the Cold War," with William Wohlforth, in Cold War Endgames, William Wohlforth, editor, Penn State University Press, 2002.
- "The Globalization of Production and the Changing Benefits of Conquest," Journal of Conflict Resolution, Vol. 43, No. 5:646-670, October 1999.
- "Dueling Realisms," International Organization, Vol. 51, No. 3: 445–477, Summer 1997.
