= University of Pittsburgh School of Public and International Affairs =

Public policy school of the University of Pittsburgh

Coordinates: 40.441648°N 79.953792°W

School of Public and International Affairs
- Type: Public
- Established: 1957
- Academic affiliation: TPC
- Dean: Carissa Slotterback
- Academic staff: 103
- Postgraduates: 400
- Location: Pittsburgh, Pennsylvania, United States
- Campus: Oakland (Main)
- Website: www.spia.pitt.edu

The School of Public and International Affairs (SPIA) is one of 17 schools comprising the University of Pittsburgh. Founded in 1957 to study national and international public administration, SPIA prides itself on its "Local to Global" distinction. As of 2018, it is one of only two policy schools with programs in the top 20 for both International Relations (Foreign Policy, 2015) and City Management and Urban Policy (U.S. News & World Report, 2018). The former mayor of Pittsburgh, Bill Peduto, is a SPIA alumnus.

SPIA is accredited by the Network of Schools of Public Policy, Affairs, and Administration (NASPAA), and is a member of the Association of Professional Schools of International Affairs (APSIA). The school is located in Wesley W. Posvar Hall on the University of Pittsburgh campus in the Oakland neighborhood of Pittsburgh. In October 2020, Carissa S. Slotterback took over as dean, replacing John Keeler, who returned to the faculty.

== History ==
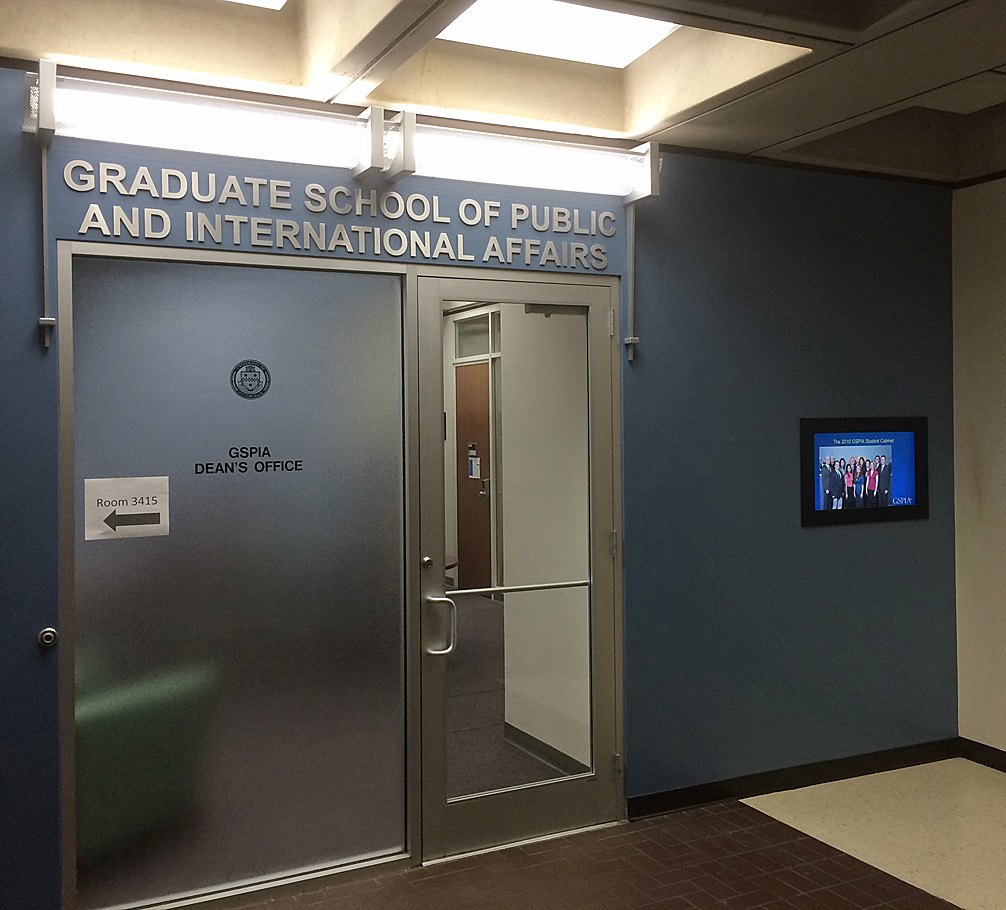
SPIA's home on the third floor of Posvar Hall

In 1957, SPIA (then "GSPIA") was founded by Donald C. Stone in an effort to promote the study of national and international public administration, and to recognize the growing significance of public policy in the global context, and was soon after noted for its breadth and scope. Stone's philosophy included promoting the notion of "citizenship" and encouraged his colleagues, students, and friends to make government better, to make administrations more effective, and to provide responsible leadership and stewardship for future generations. Stone's public service career included developing procedures for the Civil Works Administration and planning and implementing the Works Progress Administration. He helped draft the United Nations Charter and his efforts were instrumental in the success of the Marshall Plan in rebuilding Europe after the Second World War.

On March 20, 2025, the school rebranded as SPIA, dropping the "Graduate" portion of its name and launching a new Bachelor of Arts in Public Policy degree

== Demographics ==
- SPIA employs over 33 full-time, 70 adjunct faculty members, 32 staff members, and has an 11:1 student/faculty ratio. Currently, there are over 8,000 SPIA alumni working in more than 100 countries around the globe, 1,400 of which are in the Greater Pittsburgh Area.
- Entering Class Bio-Demographics (Fall 2017):
  - 400 total students
  - 69% full-time, 31% part-time
  - 61% female, 39% male
  - 41% out-of-state, 59% in-state (Pennsylvania)
  - 15% U.S. minority
  - 20% international, representing the countries of Argentina, Australia, China, Colombia, Brazil, Ghana, Guatemala, Guinea, India, Indonesia, Japan, Kenya, Kyrgyzstan, Mexico, Morocco, Nigeria, Nicaragua, Oman, Pakistan, Peru, South Korea, Vietnam, and others.

== Academics ==
SPIA offers several degree and certificate programs.

=== Degree programs ===
SPIA offers several graduate degrees and one undergraduate degree related to public affairs. Full-time students can complete most master's degree programs within 16 months of study, however, programs can be completed on part-time basis. The MPPM degree is designed for mid-career professionals, and can usually be completed in one year of full-time study. The following is a list of degrees and focuses currently available through SPIA.

- MPA - Master of Public Administration
  - Public and Nonprofit Management
  - Urban Affairs and Planning
  - Policy Research and Analysis
  - Energy and Environment
  - Governance and International Public Management
- MPIA - Master of Public & International Affairs
  - Security and Intelligence Studies
  - Human Security
  - International Political Economy
- MID - Master of International Development
  - Nongovernmental Organizations and Civil Society
  - Urban Affairs and Planning
  - Human Security
  - Energy and Environment
  - Governance and International Public Management
- MPPM - Master of Public Policy & Management (Mid-Career)
  - Individualized

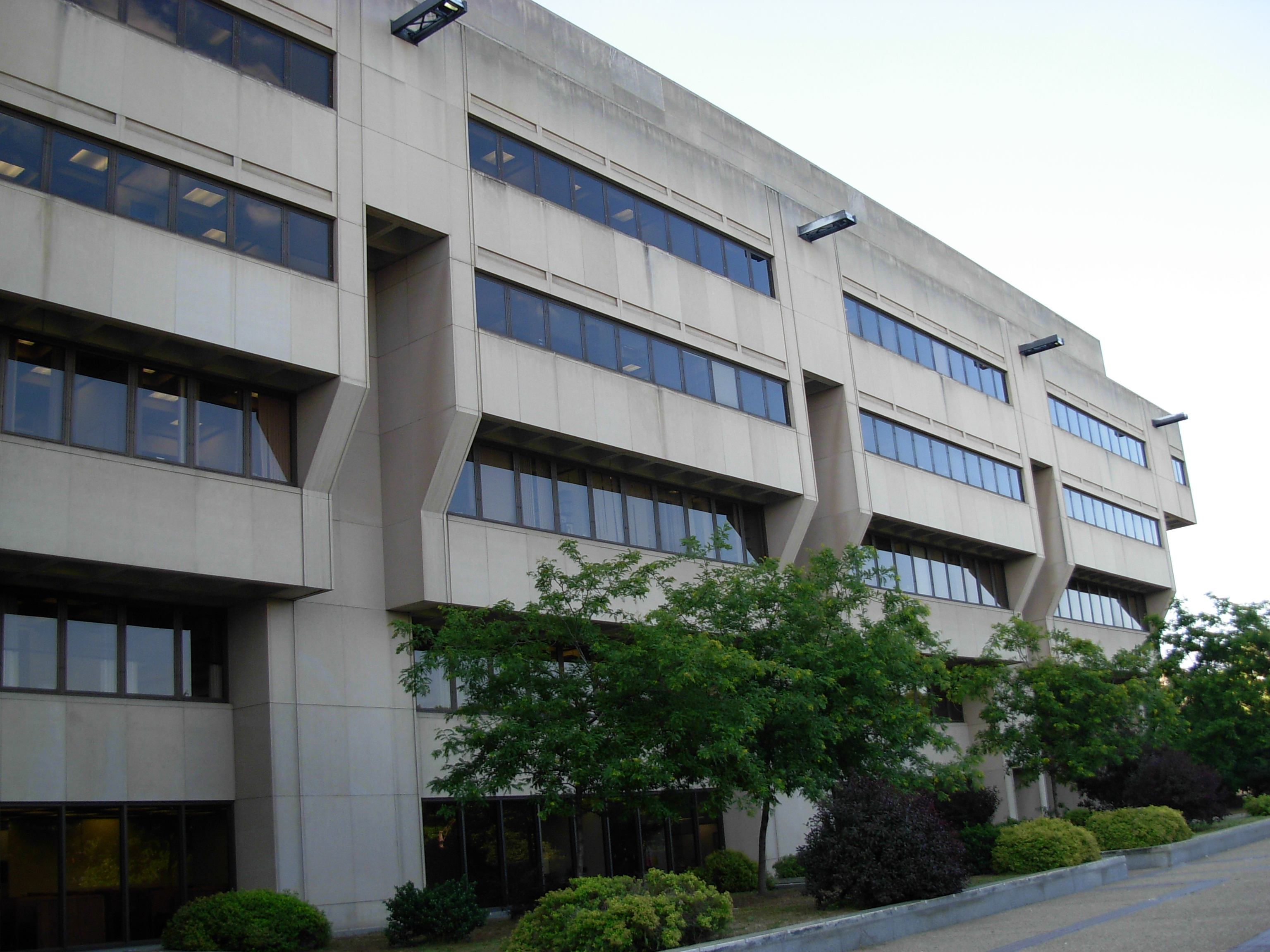
Wesley W. Posvar Hall

- PhD - Doctor of Philosophy
  - International Development (ID)
  - International Affairs (IA)
  - Public Administration (PA)
  - Public Policy & Management (PPM)

Starting in 2025, SPIA offers a Bachelor of Arts (BA) in Public Policy degree.

In 2009, SPIA added the Peace Corps Master's International (MI) track that enables students to earn a master's degree in public health and also volunteer with the Peace Corps. This program blends classroom learning with real-world experience for students interested in a career in global health.

Additionally, SPIA offers several joint degree programs with other schools within the University of Pittsburgh, as well as with universities within the Pittsburgh Council on Higher Education. The following are a list of available joint degree programs available to students at SPIA.

- MPA, MPIA, or MID & Master of Public Health (MPH)
- MPIA or MID & Master of Business Administration (MBA)
- MPA, MPIA, or MID & Master of Science in Information Science (MSIS)
- MPA, MPIA, or MID & Juris Doctor (JD)
- MPA, MPIA, or MID & Master of Social Work (MSW)

=== Certificate programs ===
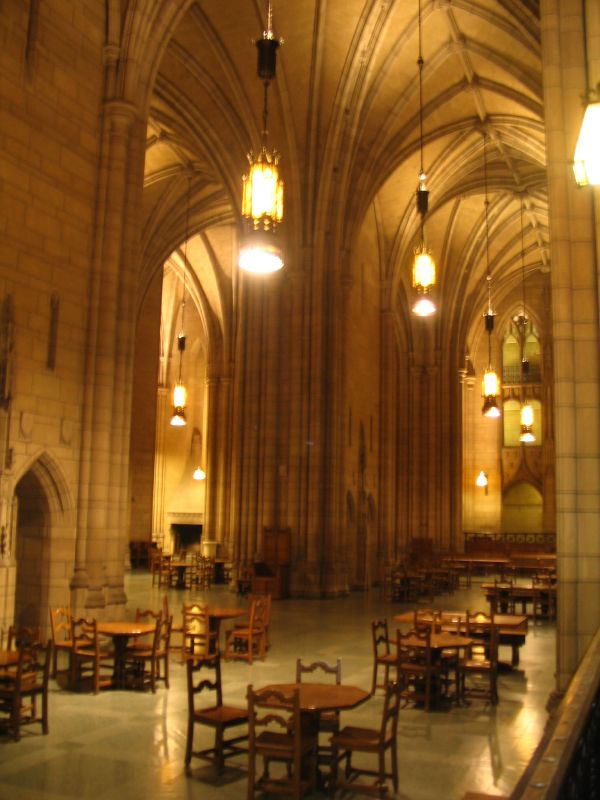
Commons Room in the Cathedral of Learning (study location near SPIA)

Certificates from the University Center for International Studies (UCIS) can usually be obtained without requiring additional credit hours, and demonstrate a focus in a particular field of study. The University Center for International Studies at the University of Pittsburgh is home to four internationally recognized area studies centers. Each one has been designated a National Resource Center by the United States Department of Education, certifying their status as leading centers of their kind in the United States. The University Center for International Studies offers Area Studies certificates in the following areas:

- African Studies
- Asian Studies
- European Union Studies
- Latin American Studies
- West European Studies
- East European Studies
- Russian Studies

In a joint partnership between SPIA and UCIS, students can also obtain a certificate in Global Studies. A certificate in Global Studies provides students with 'global competence.' Global Studies certificate students choose one of the following six global issues concentrations and unite it with the study of a particular region and language:

- Changing Identities in a Global World
- Communication, Technology, and Society
- Conflict and Conflict Resolution
- Global Health
- Global Economy and Global Governance
- Sustainable Development

== Rankings ==
- #2 in the number of NASPAA dissertation awards won by its doctoral students
- #4 top school for faculty scholarly productivity in the field of International Affairs and Development, (The Chronicle of Higher Education, 2007)
- #6 most innovative public service schools, (Best Value Schools, 2015)
- #19 worldwide for International Relations programs; #16 among US programs and #3 among public US universities (Foreign Policy, 2015)
- #38 nationally for Public Policy (U.S. News & World Report, 2020)
- #7 nationally for International Global Policy and Administration (U.S. News & World Report, 2020)
- #18 nationally for Urban Policy (U.S. News & World Report, 2020)

SPIA is one of only two schools to have two National Academy of Public Administration fellows elected in one year (William Dunn and Dean John Keeler). It is also one of nine schools to have produced at least two Network of Schools of Public Policy, Affairs, and Administration presidents.

== Research centers & institutes ==
The School of Public & International Affairs is home to several research institutes and centers.

- The Ford Institute for Human Security was established at the University of Pittsburgh as a result of an endowment gift from Ford Motor Company. The mission of the Institute is to conduct research that focuses on transnational threats to the human rights of civilian populations, The Institute's function is to generate independent research, disseminate policy papers, and advocate nonpartisan policy proposals to domestic and international policymakers.
- The Matthew B. Ridgway Center for International Security Studies is dedicated to educating the next generation of security analysts and to producing scholarship and impartial analysis that informs the options available to policymakers dealing with international and human security on a global scale. The Ridgway research program analyzes the security dynamics of the 21st century global environment, concentrating on rapidly evolving and emerging threats.
- The Center for Metropolitan Studies connects the academic programs at SPIA with state and local governments, federal agencies, regional governance institutions, and nonprofit organizations in the United States to address real time problems they are confronting. The Center for Metropolitan Studies houses CONNECT, an organization that promotes cooperation and collaboration between the City of Pittsburgh and the municipalities that comprise Pittsburgh's urban core.
- The Johnson Institute for Responsible Leadership provides students, faculty and the community at large with opportunities to engage in disciplined reflections and rigorous inquiry on issues of ethics and accountability that are of particular interest to the public and nonprofit sectors.
- Center for Disaster Management provides a school-wide locus to support research, education, and training projects that focus on extreme events. Its goal is to develop a coherent approach for research and analysis on policy issues related to disaster risk reduction and management that cross interorganizational, interdisciplinary, and interjurisdictional boundaries.

== Special programs ==
- The Philanthropy Forum provides a university-based platform for national dialogue with thinkers and practitioners in the field of philanthropy and engages in research on the history and contemporary contributions of philanthropy to local, national, and global communities.
- The Roscoe Robinson Jr. Memorial Lecture Series promotes discussion and understanding of key issues related to diversity in public service. The series features annual lectures in honor of the late Roscoe Robinson Jr., the first African American U.S. Army four-star general who earned his degree at SPIA in 1964.
- The International Political Economy Colloquium provides a forum for IPE scholars to present their works in progress.
- The Symposium on Political Violence is a joint undertaking co-sponsored with the Department of Political Science, and the Ridgway Center. The Symposium provides a forum both for external scholars and for faculty and graduate students in SPIA and the Department of Political Science at Pitt to present their research on political violence.

== SPIA student organizations ==
- SPIA Student Cabinet
- Purposeful Penny - a student charity organization benefiting Bright Kids Uganda and Urban Impact
- NABU - represents the interests of the PhD student community
- AGORA - Professional & Academic Development
- EU and the World
- Pitt Political Review (SPIA issue)
- International Student Initiative - bridges the gap between international and domestic students at SPIA with social and professional events.
- RIGHT HERE: A Forum for Volunteer Activities
- SPIA Public Speaking Group
- Out in Policy - SPIA student society for LGBT rights
