= Chain ganging =

Chain ganging is a term in the field of international relations describing the elevated probability for interstate conflict or conflagration due to several states having joined in alliances or coalitions.

The agreed principles of such alliances typically include mutual defence clauses requiring that, in the case of one member state suffering military attack from another power, all members must declare hostilities against that offending power. The result of such an arrangement is an elevated probability for an international conflagration, since the case of an actor attacking another power would almost certainly trigger, whether intentionally or not, a multinational conflict potentially involving many more actors than the original two states which had attacked and been attacked, respectively.

According to sworn agreements or treaties no member state has the option to refuse to participate in this involvement: once the states have agreed to the alliance, they are bound by obligation to join in the hostilities or conflagration as soon as they have begun in one state (though this obligation is not always honoured).

Chain ganging is believed to be most effective in a scenario with a multipolar balance of power where the allied states have a military advantage over potential enemies. Chain ganging is also often discussed in relation and comparison to its counterpart buck passing. Both are derived from neorealism and are existent in a multipolar system but chain ganging requires aggressive state behaviour to occur.

== Examples ==
An empirical example of the chain-ganging dilemma is World War I. When Italy decided to part from the Triple Alliance, both Austria-Hungary and Germany were alone for the most part in Europe (though Bulgaria and the Ottoman Empire joined Austria-Hungary and Germany to form the Central Powers), and surrounded by the Allied Powers. The defeat of either of the two would severely weaken the remaining member. According to Kenneth Waltz, "The defeat or defection of a major ally would have shaken the balance, each state was constrained to adjust its strategy and the use of its forces to the aims and fears of its partners."

Due to conflict between China and the United States, both sides have been engaging in chaining themselves to far eastern states prompting some to declare the region likely play host to the chain gang dilemma should conflict escalate in that region with the Philippines to claim an attack on America is an attack on the Philippines and vice versa during the Spratly Islands dispute.

== Etymology ==
The term is a metaphor deriving from chain gangs, groups of people, usually prisoners or slaves, bound together with chains or other devices as they work or march. Like a real-life chain gang, the states joined in a chain gang, according to bound obligation, have no option to refuse to follow along with the intent of the others. However, in reality, the members of a chain gang coalition can and sometimes do choose to refuse to acquiesce, in which case they may face international ostracism (at least from the other members of their former alliance), and possibly courtship on the part of rival coalitions. This is because, typically, few punitive actions exists in the realm of international law that can sufficiently compel a power to follow its obligations at all costs, and therefore, the incentives to breaking ranks can sometimes be rather high, especially when the state does not agree with the actions taken by the other members of its coalition.

== See also ==
- Bandwagoning
- Buck passing
