= The Fruits of Fascism =

Book by Simon Reich

Fruits of Fascism
- Cover of the first edition
- Author: Simon Reich
- Language: English
- Subject: Fascism
- Publisher: Cornell University Press
- Publication date: November 1990
- Media type: Print
- Pages: 341
- ISBN: 0-8014-9729-9
- OCLC: 21443039
- Dewey Decimal: 330.94/086 20
- LC Class: HC286.5 .R39 1990

The Fruits of Fascism: Postwar Prosperity in Historical Perspective is a 1990 book by a professor of International Affairs, Simon Reich.

It describes the difference in the economic success of nations in post World War II Europe. The book links the effects of globalization of democratic nations and contrasts them with the economic growth of non-globalized nations which emerged from fascist regimes. It implies that globalization by international mergers of privately owned corporate legal bodies might form the basis for future tyranny through the monetary system.

== See also ==
- World government
- Zeitgeist, a film portraying some aspects of this book
