= Grand strategy =

Long-term strategy employed by a nation to further its interests

Grand strategy or high strategy is a state's strategy of how means (military and nonmilitary) can be used to advance and achieve national interests in the long-term. Issues of grand strategy typically include the choice of military doctrine, force structure and alliances, as well as economic relations, diplomatic behavior, and methods to extract or mobilize resources.

In contrast to strategy, grand strategy encompasses more than military means (such as diplomatic and economic means); does not equate success with purely military victory but also the pursuit of peacetime goals and prosperity; and considers goals and interests in the long-term rather than short-term.

In contrast to foreign policy, grand strategy emphasizes the military implications of policy; considers costs benefits of policies, as well as limits on capabilities; establishes priorities; and sets out a practical plan rather than a set of ambitions and wishes. A country's political leadership typically directs grand strategy with input from the most senior military officials. Development of a nation's grand strategy may extend across many years or even multiple generations.

Much scholarship on grand strategy focuses on the United States, which has since the end of World War II had a grand strategy oriented around primacy, "deep engagement", and/or liberal hegemony, which entail that the United States maintains military predominance; maintains an extensive network of allies (exemplified by NATO, bilateral alliances and foreign US military bases); and integrates other states into US-designed international institutions (such as the IMF, WTO/GATT, and World Bank). Critics of this grand strategy, which includes proponents for offshore balancing, selective engagement, restraint, and isolationism, argue for pulling back.

== Definition ==
There is no universally accepted definition of grand strategy. One common definition is that grand strategy is a state's strategy of how means (military and nonmilitary) can be used to advance and achieve national interests in the long-term. Grand strategy expands on the traditional idea of strategy in three ways:

1. expanding strategy beyond military means to include diplomatic, financial, economic, informational, etc. means
2. examining internal in addition to external forces – taking into account both the various instruments of power and the internal policies necessary for their implementation (conscription, for example)
3. including consideration of periods of peacetime in addition to wartime

Thinkers differ as to whether grand strategy should serve to promote peace (as emphasized by B. H. Liddell Hart) or advance the security of a state (as emphasized by Barry Posen).

British military historian B. H. Liddell Hart played an influential role in popularizing the concept of grand strategy in the mid-20th century. Subsequent definitions tend to build on his. He defines grand strategy as follows:

[T]he role of grand strategy – higher strategy – is to co-ordinate and direct all the resources of a nation, or band of nations, towards the attainment of the political object of the war – the goal defined by fundamental policy.

Grand strategy should both calculate and develop the economic resources and man-power of nations in order to sustain the fighting services. Also the moral resources – for to foster the people's willing spirit is often as important as to possess the more concrete forms of power. Grand strategy, too, should regulate the distribution of power between the several services, and between the services and industry. Moreover, fighting power is but one of the instruments of grand strategy – which should take account of and apply the power of financial pressure, and, not least of ethical pressure, to weaken the opponent's will. ...

Furthermore, while the horizons of strategy is bounded by the war, grand strategy looks beyond the war to the subsequent peace. It should not only combine the various instruments, but so regulate their use as to avoid damage to the future state of peace – for its security and prosperity.

=== History ===
In antiquity, the Greek word "strategy" referred to the skills of a general. By the sixth century, Byzantines distinguished between "strategy" (the means by which a general defends the homeland and defeats the enemy) and "tactics" (the science of organizing armies). Byzantine Emperor Leo VI distinguished between the two terms in his work Taktika.

Prior to the French Revolution, most thinkers wrote on military science rather than grand strategy. The term grand strategy first emerged in France in the 19th century. Jacques Antoine Hippolyte, Comte de Guibert, wrote an influential work, General Essay on Tactics, that distinguished between "tactics" and "grand tactics" (which scholars today would refer to as grand strategy). Emperor Leo's Taktika was shortly thereafter translated into French and German, leading most thinkers to distinguish between tactics and strategy.

Carl von Clausewitz proposed in an influential work that politics and war were intrinsically linked. Clausewitz defined strategy as "the use of engagements for the object of the war". Antoine-Henri Jomini argued that because of the intrinsically political nature of war that different types of wars (e.g. offensive wars, defensive wars, wars of expediency, wars with/without allies, wars of intervention, wars of conquest, wars of opinion, national wars, civil wars) had to be waged differently, thus creating the need for a grand strategy. Some contemporaries of Clausewitz and Jomini disputed the links between politics and war, arguing that politics ceases to be important once war has begun.

Narrow definitions, similar to those of Clausewitz, were commonplace during the 19th century. Towards the end of the 19th century and into the early 20th century (in particular with B. H. Liddell Hart's writings), some writers expanded the definition of strategy to refer to the distribution and application of military means to achieve policy objectives. For these thinkers, grand strategy was not only different from the operational strategy of winning a particular battle, but it also encompassed both peacetime and wartime policies. For them, grand strategy should operate for decades (or longer) and should not cease at war's end or begin at war's start.

In the 20th century, some thinkers argued that all manners of actions (political, economic, military, cultural) counted as grand strategy in an era of total warfare. However, most definitions saw a division of labor between the actions of political leaders and those of the executing military.

According to Helmuth von Moltke, the initial task of strategy was to serve politics and the subsequent task was to prepare the means to wage war. Moltke however warned that plans may not survive an encounter with the enemy. Other thinkers challenged Clausewitz's idea that politics could set the aims of war, as the aims of war would change during the war given the success or failure of military operations.These thinkers argued that strategy was a process that required adaptation to changing circumstances.

Scholarship on grand strategy experienced a resurgence in the late 1960s and 1970s. Bernard Brodie defined strategy as "guide to accomplishing something and doing it efficiently... a theory for action".

== Historical examples ==
According to historian Hal Brands, "all states... do grand strategy, but many of them do not do it particularly well."

=== Peloponnesian War ===
One of the earlier writings on grand strategy comes from Thucydides's History of the Peloponnesian War, an account of the war between the Peloponnesian League (led by Sparta) and the Delian League (led by Athens).

=== Roman Empire ===
From the era of Hadrian, Roman emperors employed a military strategy of "preclusive security—the establishment of a linear barrier of perimeter defence around the Empire. The Legions were stationed in great fortresses". These "fortresses" existed along the perimeter of the Empire, often accompanied by actual walls (for example, Hadrian's Wall). Due to the perceived impenetrability of these perimeter defenses, the Emperors kept no central reserve army. The Roman system of roads allowed for soldiers to move from one frontier to another (for the purpose of reinforcements during a siege) with relative ease. These roads also allowed for a logistical advantage for Rome over her enemies, as supplies could be moved just as easily across the Roman road system as soldiers. This way, if the legions could not win a battle through military combat skill or superior numbers, they could simply outlast the invaders, who, as historian E.A. Thompson wrote, "did not think in terms of millions of bushels of wheat."

The emperor Constantine moved the legions from the frontiers to one consolidated roving army as a way to save money and to protect wealthier citizens within the cities. However, this grand strategy, according to some ancient sources, had costly effects on the Roman empire by weakening its frontier defenses and allowing it to be susceptible to outside armies coming in. Also, people who lived near the Roman frontiers would begin to look to the barbarians for protection after the Roman armies departed. This argument is considered to have originated in the writings of Eunapius. As stated by the 5th century AD historian Zosimus:

Constantine abolished this frontier security by removing the greater part of the soldiery from the frontiers to cities that needed no auxiliary forces. He thus deprived of help the people who were harassed by the barbarians and burdened tranquil cities with the pest of the military, so that several straightway were deserted. Moreover, he softened the soldiers who treated themselves to shows and luxuries. Indeed, to speak plainly, he personally planted the first seeds of our present devastated state of affairs.

— Zosimus

This charge by Zosimus is considered to be a gross exaggeration and inaccurate assessment of the situations in the fourth century under Constantine by many modern historians. B.H. Warmington, for instance, argues that the statement by Zosimus is "[an] oversimplification," reminding us that "the charge of exposure of the frontier regions is at best anachronistic and probably reflects Zosimus' prejudices against Constantine; the corruption of the soldiers who lived in the cities was a literary commonplace."

=== World War II ===
An example of modern grand strategy is the decision of the Allies in World War II to concentrate on the defeat of Germany first. The decision, a joint agreement made after the attack on Pearl Harbor (1941) had drawn the US into the war, was a sensible one in that Germany was the most powerful member of the Axis, and directly threatened the existence of the United Kingdom and the Soviet Union. Conversely, while Japan's conquests garnered considerable public attention, they were mostly in colonial areas deemed less essential by planners and policy-makers. The specifics of Allied military strategy in the Pacific War were therefore shaped by the lesser resources made available to the theatre commanders.

=== Cold War ===
The US and the UK used a policy of containment as part of their grand strategy during the Cold War.

== In the United States ==
The conversation around grand strategy in the United States has evolved significantly since the country's founding, with the nation shifting from a strategy of continental expansion, isolation from European conflicts, and opposition to European empires in the Western hemisphere in its first century, to a major debate about the acquisition of an empire in the 1890s (culminating in the conquest of the Philippines and Cuba during the Spanish–American War), followed by rapid shifts between offshore balancing, liberal internationalism, and isolationism around the world wars. The Cold War saw increasing use of deep, onshore engagement strategies (including the creation of a number of permanent alliances, significant involvement in other states' internal politics, and a major counterinsurgency war in Vietnam.) With the end of the Cold War, an early strategic debate eventually coalesced into a strategy of primacy, culminating in the invasion of Iraq in 2003. The aftershocks of this war, along with an economic downturn, rising national debt, and deepening political gridlock, have led to a renewed strategic debate, centered on two major schools of thought: primacy and restraint. A return to offshore balancing has also been proposed by prominent political scientists Stephen Walt and John Mearsheimer.

=== In the 1990s ===
The end of the Cold War and the collapse of the Soviet Union removed the focal point of U.S. strategy: containing the Soviet Union. A major debate emerged about the future direction of U.S. foreign policy. In a 1997 article, Barry R. Posen and Andrew L. Ross identified four major grand strategic alternatives in the debate:

1. neo-isolationism
2. selective engagement
3. cooperative security
4. primacy

==== Neo-isolationism ====
Stemming from a defensive realist understanding of international politics, what the authors call "neo-isolationism" advocates the United States remove itself from active participation in international politics in order to maintain its national security. It holds that because there are no threats to the American homeland, the United States does not need to intervene abroad. Stressing a particular understanding of nuclear weapons, the authors describe how proponents believe the destructive power of nuclear weapons and retaliatory potential of the United States assure the political sovereignty and territorial integrity of the United States, while the proliferation of such weapons to countries like Britain, France, China and Russia prevents the emergence of any competing hegemon on the Eurasian landmass. The United States' security and the absence of threats means that "national defense will seldom justify intervention abroad." Even further, its proponents argue that "the United States is not responsible for, and cannot afford the costs of, maintaining world order." They also believe that "the pursuit of economic well-being is best left to the private sector," and that the United States should not attempt to spread its values because doing so increases resentment towards the U.S. and in turn, decreases its security. In short, neo-isolationism advises the United States to preserve its freedom of action and strategic independence.

In more practical terms, the authors discuss how the implementation of a so-called "neo-isolationist" grand strategy would involve less focus on the issue of nuclear proliferation, withdrawal from NATO, and major cuts to the United States military presence abroad. The authors see a military force structure that prioritizes a secure nuclear second-strike capability, intelligence, naval and special operations forces while limiting the forward-deployment of forces to Europe and Asia.

Posen and Ross identify such prominent scholars and political figures as Earl Ravenal, Patrick Buchanan and Doug Bandow.

==== Selective engagement ====
With similar roots in the realist tradition of international relations, selective engagement advocates that the United States should intervene in regions of the world only if they directly affect its security and prosperity. The focus, therefore, lies on those powers with significant industrial and military potential and the prevention of war amongst those states. Most proponents of this strategy believe Europe, Asia and the Middle East matter most to the United States. Europe and Asia contain the great powers, which have the greatest military and economic impact on international politics, and the Middle East is a primary source of oil for much of the developed world. In addition to these more particular concerns, selective engagement also focuses on preventing nuclear proliferation and any conflict that could lead to a great power war, but provides no clear guidelines for humanitarian interventions.

The authors envision that a strategy of selective engagement would involve a strong nuclear deterrent with a force structure capable of fighting two regional wars, each through some combination of ground, air and sea forces complemented with forces from a regional ally. They question, however, whether such a policy could garner sustained support from a liberal democracy experienced with a moralistic approach to international relations, whether the United States could successfully differentiate necessary versus unnecessary engagement and whether a strategy that focuses on Europe, Asia and the Middle East actually represents a shift from current engagement.

In the piece, Barry Posen classified himself as a "selective engagement" advocate, with the caveat that the United States should not only act to reduce the likelihood of great power war, but also oppose the rise of a Eurasian hegemon capable of threatening the United States.

Robert J. Art argues that selective engagement is the best strategy for the twenty-first century because it is, by definition, selective. "It steers the middle course between an isolationist, unilateralist course, on the one hand, and world policeman, highly interventionist role, on the other." Therefore, Art, concludes, it avoids both overly restrictive and overly expansive definitions of U.S. interests, finding instead a compromise between doing too much and too little militarily. Additionally, selective engagement is the best strategy for achieving both realist goals—preventing WMD terrorism, maintaining great power peace, and securing the supply of oil; and liberal goals—preserving free trade, spreading democracy, observing human rights, and minimizing the impact of climate change. The realist goals represent vital interests and the liberal goals represent desirable interests. Desirable interests are not unimportant, Art maintains, but they are of lesser importance when a trade-off between them and vital interests must be made. Selective engagement, however, mitigates the effect of the trade-off precisely because it is a moderate, strategic policy.

==== Cooperative security ====
The authors write "the most important distinguishing feature of cooperative security is the proposition that peace is effectively indivisible." Unlike the other three alternatives, cooperative security draws upon liberalism as well as realism in its approach to international relations. Stressing the importance of world peace and international cooperation, the view supposes the growth in democratic governance and the use of international institutions will hopefully overcome the security dilemma and deter interstate conflict. Posen and Ross propose that collective action is the most effective means of preventing potential state and non-state aggressors from threatening other states. Cooperative security considers nuclear proliferation, regional conflicts and humanitarian crises to be major interests of the United States.

The authors imagine that such a grand strategy would involve stronger support for international institutions, agreements, and the frequent use of force for humanitarian purposes. Were international institutions to ultimately entail the deployment of a multinational force, the authors suppose the United States' contribution would emphasize command, control, communications and intelligence, defense suppression, and precision-guided munitions-what they considered at the time to be the United States' comparative advantage in aerospace power. Collective action problems, the problems of the effective formation of international institutions, the vacillating feelings of democratic populations, and the limitations of arms control are all offered by the authors as noted criticisms of collective security.

==== Primacy ====
Primacy is a grand strategy with four parts:

1. Military preponderance
2. Reassurances and containment of allies
3. Integration of other states into US-designed institutions
4. Limits to the spread of nuclear weapons

As a result, it advocates that the United States pursue ultimate hegemony and dominate the international system economically, politically and militarily, rejecting any return to bipolarity or multipolarity and preventing the emergence of any peer competitor. Therefore, its proponents argue that U.S. foreign policy should focus on maintaining U.S. power and preventing any other power from becoming a serious challenger to the United States. With this in mind, some supporters of this strategy argue that the U.S. should work to contain China and other competitors rather than engage them. In regards to humanitarian crises and regional conflicts, primacy holds that the U.S. should only intervene when they directly impact national security, more along the lines of selective engagement than collective security. It does, however, advocate for the active prevention of nuclear proliferation at a level similar to collective security.

Implementation of such a strategy would entail military forces at similar levels to those during the Cold War, with emphasis on military modernization and research and development. They note, however, that "the quest for primacy is likely to prove futile for five reasons": the diffusion of economic and technological capabilities, interstate balancing against the United States, the danger that hegemonic leadership will fatally undermine valuable multilateral institutions, the feasibility of preventive war and the dangers of imperial overstretch.

Daniel Drezner, professor of international politics at Tufts University, outlines three arguments offered by primacy enthusiasts contending that military preeminence generates positive economic externalities. "One argument, which I label 'geoeconomic favoritism,' hypothesizes that the military hegemon will attract private capital because it provides the greatest security and safety to investors. A second argument posits that the benefits from military primacy flow from geopolitical favoritism: that sovereign states, in return for living under the security umbrella of the military superpower, voluntarily transfer resources to help subsidize the cost of the economy. The third argument postulates that states are most likely to enjoy global public goods under a unipolar distribution of military power, accelerating global economic growth and reducing security tensions. These public goods benefit the hegemon as much, if not more, than they do other actors." Drezner maintains the empirical evidence supporting the third argument is the strongest, though with some qualifiers. "Although the precise causal mechanism remain disputed, hegemonic eras are nevertheless strongly correlated with lower trade barriers and greater levels of globalization." However, Drezner highlights a caveat: The cost of maintaining global public goods catches up to the superpower providing them. "Other countries free-ride off of the hegemon, allowing them to grow faster. Technologies diffuse from the hegemonic power to the rest of the world, facilitating catch-up. Chinese analysts have posited that these phenomena, occurring right now, are allowing China to outgrow the United States."

==== Primacy vs. selective engagement ====
Barry Posen, director of the Security Studies Program at the Massachusetts Institute of Technology, believes the activist U.S. foreign policy that continues to define U.S. strategy in the twenty-first century is an "undisciplined, expensive, and bloody strategy" that has done more harm than good to U.S. national security. "It makes enemies almost as fast as it slays them, discourages allies from paying for their own defense, and convinces powerful states to band together and oppose Washington's plans, further raising the costs of carrying out its foreign policy." The United States was able to afford such adventurism during the 1990s, Posen argues, because American power projection was completely unchallenged. Over the last decade, however, American power has been relatively declining while the Pentagon continues to "depend on continuous infusions of cash simply to retain its current force structure—levels of spending that the Great Recession and the United States' ballooning debt have rendered unsustainable."

Posen proposes the United States abandon its hegemonic strategy and replace it with one of restraint. This translates into jettisoning the quest of shaping a world that is satisfactory to U.S. values and instead advances vital national security interests: The U.S. military would go to war only when it must. Large troop contingents in unprecedentedly peaceful regions such as Europe would be significantly downsized, incentivizing NATO members to provide more for their own security. Under such a scenario, the United States would have more leeway in using resources to combat the most pressing threats to its security. A strategy of restraint, therefore, would help preserve the country's prosperity and security more so than a hegemonic strategy. To be sure, Posen makes clear that he is not advocating isolationism. Rather, the United States should focus on three pressing security challenges: preventing a powerful rival from upending the global balance of power, fighting terrorists, and limiting nuclear proliferation.

John Ikenberry of Princeton University and Stephen Brooks and William Wohlforth, both of Dartmouth College, push back on Posen's selective engagement thesis, arguing that American engagement is not as bad as Posen makes it out to be. Advocates of selective engagement, they argue, overstate the costs of current U.S. grand strategy and understate the benefits. "The benefits of deep engagement...are legion. U.S. security commitments reduce competition in key regions and act as a check against potential rivals. They help maintain an open world economy and give Washington leverage in economic negotiations. And they make it easier for the United States to secure cooperation for combating a wide range of global threats."

Ikenberry, Brooks, and Wohlforth are not convinced that the current U.S. grand strategy generates subsequent counterbalancing. Unlike the prior hegemons, the United States is geographically isolated and faces no contiguous great power rivals interested in balancing it. This means the United States is far less threatening to great powers that are situated oceans away, the authors claim. Moreover, any competitor would have a hard time matching U.S. military might. "Not only is the United States so far ahead militarily in both quantitative and qualitative terms, but its security guarantees also give it the leverage to prevent allies from giving military technology to potential U.S. rivals. Because the United States dominates the high-end defense industry, it can trade access to its defense market for allies' agreement not to transfer key military technologies to its competitors."

Finally, when the United States wields its security leverage, the authors argue, it shapes the overall structure of the global economy. "Washington wins when U.S. allies favor [the] status quo, and one reason they are inclined to support the existing system is because they value their military alliances."

Ted Carpenter, senior fellow at the Cato Institute, believes that the proponents of primacy suffer from the "light-switch model," in which only two positions exist: on and off. "Many, seemingly most, proponents of U.S. preeminence do not recognize the existence of options between current policy of promiscuous global interventionism and isolationism." Adherence to the light switch model, Carpenter argues, reflects intellectual rigidity or an effort to stifle discussion about a range of alternatives to the status quo. Selective engagement is a strategy that sits in between primacy and isolationism and, given growing multipolarity and American fiscal precariousness, should be taken seriously. "Selectivity is not merely an option when it comes to embarking on military interventions. It is imperative for a major power that wishes to preserve its strategic insolvency. Otherwise, overextension and national exhaustion become increasing dangers." Carpenter thinks that off-loading U.S. security responsibility must be assessed on a case-by-case basis. Nevertheless, the United States must refrain from using military might in campaigns that do not directly deal with U.S. interests. "If a sense of moral indignation, instead of a calculating assessment of the national interest, governs U.S. foreign policy, the United States will become involved in even more murky conflicts in which few if any tangible American interests are at stake."

=== Today ===
Posen has argued that the four schools of U.S. grand strategy that he identified in the 1990s have been replaced by just two: liberal hegemony, which came from a fusion of primacy and cooperative security, and restraint, which came from a fusion of neo-isolationism and selective engagement. Other scholars have proposed a third policy, offshore balancing.

==== Liberal hegemony ====
Proponents of liberal hegemony favor a world order in which the United States is a hegemon and uses this power advantage to create a liberal international system and at times use force to enforce or spread liberal values (such as individual rights, free trade, and the rule of law). The United States strives to retain overwhelming military power, under a theory that potential competitors will not even try to compete on the global stage. It also retains an extensive network of permanent alliance commitments around the world, using the alliance system both to advance and retain hegemonic power and to solidify emerging liberal political systems. According to Posen, this strategy sees "threats emanating from three major sources: failed states, rogue states, and illiberal peer competitors." Failed states, in this view, are sources of instability; rogue states can sponsor terrorism, acquire weapons of mass destruction, and behave unpredictably; illiberal peer competitors would compete directly with the United States and "would complicate the spread of liberal institutions and the construction of liberal states." Support for liberal hegemonic strategies among major thinkers in both political parties helps explain the broad elite support for the 2003 invasion of Iraq and the 2011 intervention in Libya, even though U.S. military involvement in those conflicts had been initiated by presidents of different parties. The chief difference on foreign policy between Republican and Democratic proponents of liberal hegemony, according to Posen, is on support for international institutions as a means to achieving hegemony.

==== Restraint ====
Proponents of a grand strategy of restraint call for the United States to significantly reduce its overseas security commitments and largely avoid involvement in conflicts abroad. America would take advantage of what Posen calls a "remarkably good" strategic position: "[The United States] is rich, distant from other great powers, and defended by a powerful nuclear deterrent. Other great powers are at present weaker than the United States, close to one another, and face the same pressures to defend themselves as does the United States." Proponents of strategic restraint argue, consistent with the realist tradition, that states are self-interested and accordingly will look out for their own interests and balance against aggressors; however, when possible, states prefer to "free ride" or "cheap ride," passing the buck to other states to bear the cost of balancing. Restraint proponents also emphasize the deterrent power of nuclear weapons, which tremendously raise the stakes of confrontations between great powers, breeding caution, rather than rewarding aggression. Restraint advocates see nationalism as a powerful force, one that makes states even more resistant to outside conquest and thus makes the international system more stable. Restraint proponents also argue, drawing on thinkers like the Prussian strategist Carl von Clausewitz, that military force is a blunt, expensive, and unpredictable instrument, and that it accordingly should only be used rarely, for clear goals.

Restraint is distinct from isolationism: isolationists favor restricting trade and immigration and tend to believe that events in the outside world have little impact within the United States. As already noted, it is sometimes confused with non-interventionism. Restraint, however, sees economic dynamism as a key source of national power and accordingly tends to argue for a relatively open trade system. Some restrainers call for supporting this trade system via significant naval patrols; others suggest that the international economy is resilient against disruptions and, with rare exceptions, does not require a powerful state to guarantee the security of global trade.

==== Offshore balancing ====
In offshore balancing, the United States would refrain from significant involvement in security affairs overseas except to prevent a state from establishing hegemony in what offshore balancers identify as the world's three key strategic regions: Europe, Northeast Asia, and the Persian Gulf. This strategy advocates a significantly reduced overseas presence compared to liberal hegemony, but argues that intervention is necessary in more circumstances than restraint. Offshore balancing is associated with offensive realist theories of state behavior: it believes that conquest can often enable states to gain power, and thus that a hegemon in regions with large economies, high populations, or critical resources could quickly become a global menace to U.S. national interests.

== See also ==
- The Art of War
- Grand strategy wargame
- Strategy
- Military doctrine
- Military strategy
- Military tactics
- Naval strategy
- Operational mobility
- Principles of war
- Simulation
- Total war
- United States Army Strategist
- Wargaming
- War termination

== Sources ==
=== Academic ===
- Kennedy, Paul M. (1991). Grand Strategies in War and Peace. Yale University Press. ISBN 978-0-300-05666-2.
- Posen, Barry R. (2014). Restraint: A New Foundation for U.S. Grand Strategy. Cornell University Press. ISBN 978-0-8014-7086-8.
- Platias, Athanassios; Koliopoulos, Constantinos (2017). Thucydides on Strategy: Grand Strategies in the Peloponnesian War and Their Relevance Today. Oxford University Press. ISBN 978-0-19-754805-9.

=== Non-academic ===
- Heuser, Beatrice (2010). The Evolution of Strategy. doi:10.1017/cbo9780511762895. ISBN 978-0-521-19968-1.
