= Screening Enlightenment =

2010 book by Hiroshi Kitamura

Screening Enlightenment: Hollywood and the Cultural Reconstruction of Defeated Japan
- Author: Hiroshi Kitamura
- Language: English
- Genre: Non-fiction
- Publication date: 2010
- Publication place: United States

Screening Enlightenment: Hollywood and the Cultural Reconstruction of Defeated Japan is a 2010 non-fiction book by Hiroshi Kitamura, an assistant professor of history at the College of William and Mary.
