= Ford Institute for Human Security =

Research Logo

The Ford Institute for Human Security was established in 2003, and is an independent research institute located within the University of Pittsburgh. The researchers at the institute primarily investigate issues relating to human rights, including: genocide, forced labor, corporate responsibility, international conflicts, forced migration, refugees, and environmental security. The institute generates and disseminates policy papers and advances nonpartisan policy proposals. Research produced by the Ford Institute is available to national and international policy makers, non-governmental organizations, corporations and any interested organizations. Each year the institute hosts several conferences, speakers, and workshops on issues related to human security. The Ford Institute was created with a large endowment from Ford Motor Company, and is currently under the direction of Dr. Müge Kökten Finkel, associate professor at the Graduate School of Public & International Affairs (GSPIA). The Ford Institute was previously directed by professors Simon F. Reich, who founded the institute in 2003, Paul J. Nelson, and Taylor B. Seybolt.

== Research groups ==
Research at the Ford Institute is broken into several project groups, each with a particular focus. Each project is directed by a University of Pittsburgh faculty member, and consists of policy analysts and researchers within the respective field. Each project group develops policy papers and findings reports based on research results. Currently, the project groups are as follows:

- Genocide
- Slave and Forced Labor
- Corporate Social Responsibility
- Intrastate Conflict and Human Rights
- Internal Displacement, Forced Migration, and Refugees
- Environmental Security and Public Health

== Affiliates ==
- The Fondation Nationale des Sciences Politiques (France)
- International Peace Research Institute of Oslo (Norway)
- The RISE Institute (Washington D.C. & Columbia)
- Graduate School of Public and International Affairs
- University Center for International Studies
