= Buck passing =

English-language idiom meaning "to shift blame onto another"

Buck passing, or passing the buck, is the act of attributing to another person or group one's own responsibility. It is often used to refer to a strategy in power politics whereby a state tries to get another state to deter or fight an aggressor state while it remains on the sidelines. Buck passing is not to be confused with scapegoating, the act of blaming.

== Etymology ==
The expression is said to have originated from poker in which a marker or counter (such as a knife with a buckhorn handle during the American Frontier era) was used to indicate the person whose turn it was to deal. If the player did not wish to deal, the responsibility could be passed by the passing of the "buck", as the counter came to be called, to the next player.

== In international relations ==
Passing the buck in international relations theory involves the tendency of nation-states to refuse to confront a growing threat in the hopes that another state will. According to John Mearsheimer, Thomas Christensen and Jack Snyder, buck passing is particularly common in multipolar international systems whereas it is rare in bipolar international systems. Examples of buck passing include:

- The delay in forming a balancing coalition against Napoleon until 1813
- The refusal of the United Kingdom, United States, and France to confront Nazi Germany effectively in the 1930s. With the Munich Agreement, France and the United Kingdom passed the buck to the Soviet Union, which then avoided armed confrontation by signing the Molotov–Ribbentrop Pact.
- The failure of European great powers to balance against Bismarck as he unified Germany.

Similarly, Mearsheimer argues that the delay of the Normandy Invasion shows that a buck passing state can shift the balance of power in its favor: "There is no question that the United States benefited greatly from delaying the Normandy invasion until late in the war, when both the German and the Soviet armies were battered and worn down. Not surprisingly, Joseph Stalin believed that the United Kingdom and the United States were purposely allowing Germany and the Soviet Union to bleed each other white, so that those offshore balancers [the United States and the United Kingdom] could dominate postwar Europe."

== "The buck stops here" ==
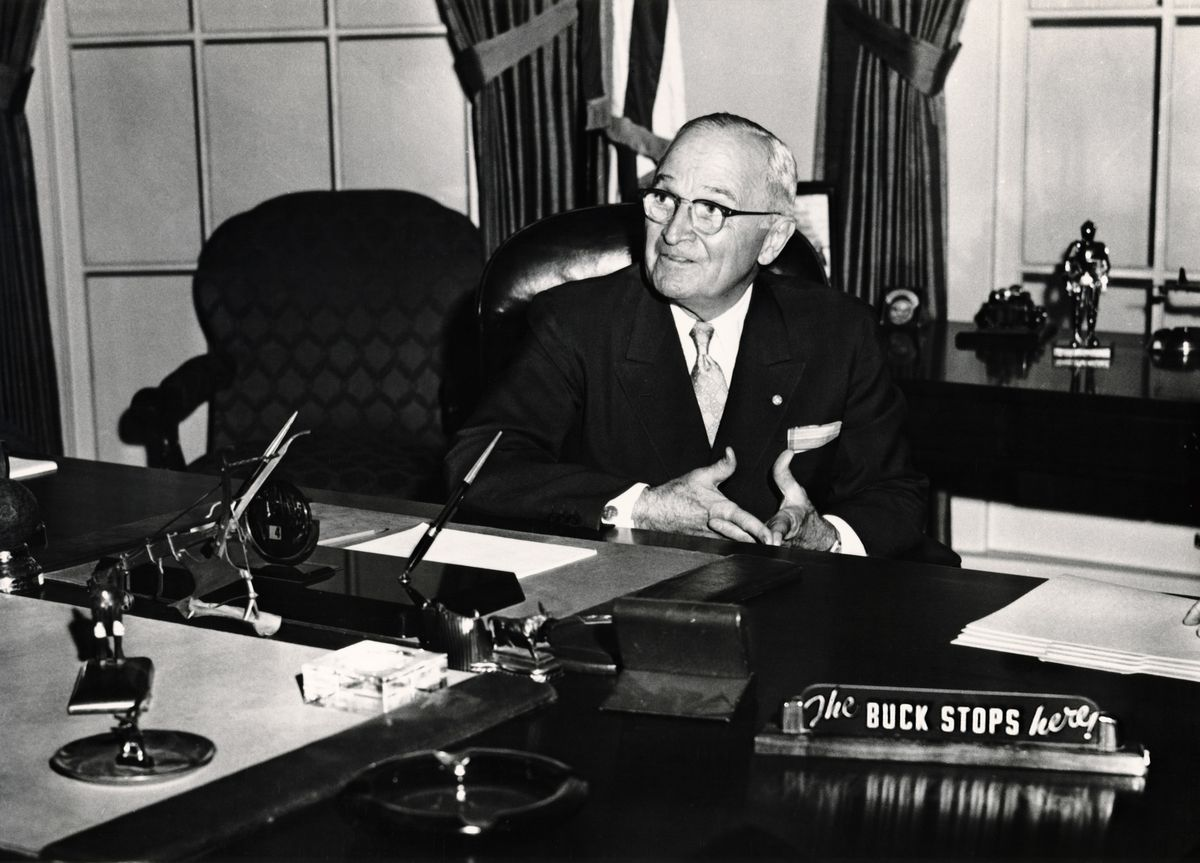
At the recreation of the Truman Oval Office at the Truman Library in 1959, former President Truman poses by his old desk which has the famous "The Buck Stops Here" sign.

"The buck stops here" is a phrase that was popularized by U.S. President Harry S. Truman, who kept a sign with that phrase on his desk in the Oval Office. The phrase refers to the notion that the President has to make the decisions and accept the ultimate responsibility for those decisions. Truman received the sign as a gift from a prison warden who was also an avid poker player. It is also the motto of the U.S. Naval Aircraft Carrier USS Harry S. Truman (CVN-75). The reverse of the sign reads, "I'm from Missouri." This is a reference to Truman's home state as well as Willard Duncan Vandiver's statement: "I'm from Missouri. You've got to show me."

President Jimmy Carter arranged to borrow the sign from the Harry S. Truman Presidential Library and Museum. Footage from Carter's "Address to the Nation on Energy" shows the sign on the desk during his administration.

The phrase has been referenced in subsequent episodes in presidential history. During the Watergate scandal, Nixon administration officials sought to scapegoat G. Gordon Liddy and had the motto "The buck stops with Liddy".

On January 10, 2019, 19 days into a federal government shutdown, a reporter asked President Donald Trump if "the buck stops with you over this shutdown". Trump responded with "The buck stops with everybody."

In 2019, in his first speech as U.K. Prime Minister, Boris Johnson vowed to "take personal responsibility for the change" that he would advance, saying "The buck stops here."

In 2021, U.S. President Joe Biden said in his statement regarding his affirmation of the Afghanistan withdrawal, "The buck stops with me." During their terms in office, president of South Korea Yoon Suk Yeol was gifted a replica of the Truman desk sign by President Biden, which he displayed on his desk.

== See also ==
- Button (poker) – Marker used to signal the dealer or last player in poker
- Bystander effect – Social psychological theory
- Command responsibility – Doctrine of hierarchical accountability
- Outsourcing – Contracting internal tasks to an external organization
- Peter principle – Management concept by Laurence J. Peter
- Scapegoat – Animal which is ritually burdened
- Somebody else's problem – Dismissive figure of speech
- Tragedy of the commons – Overuse of a shared resource
