= William Wohlforth =

American political scientist (born 1959)

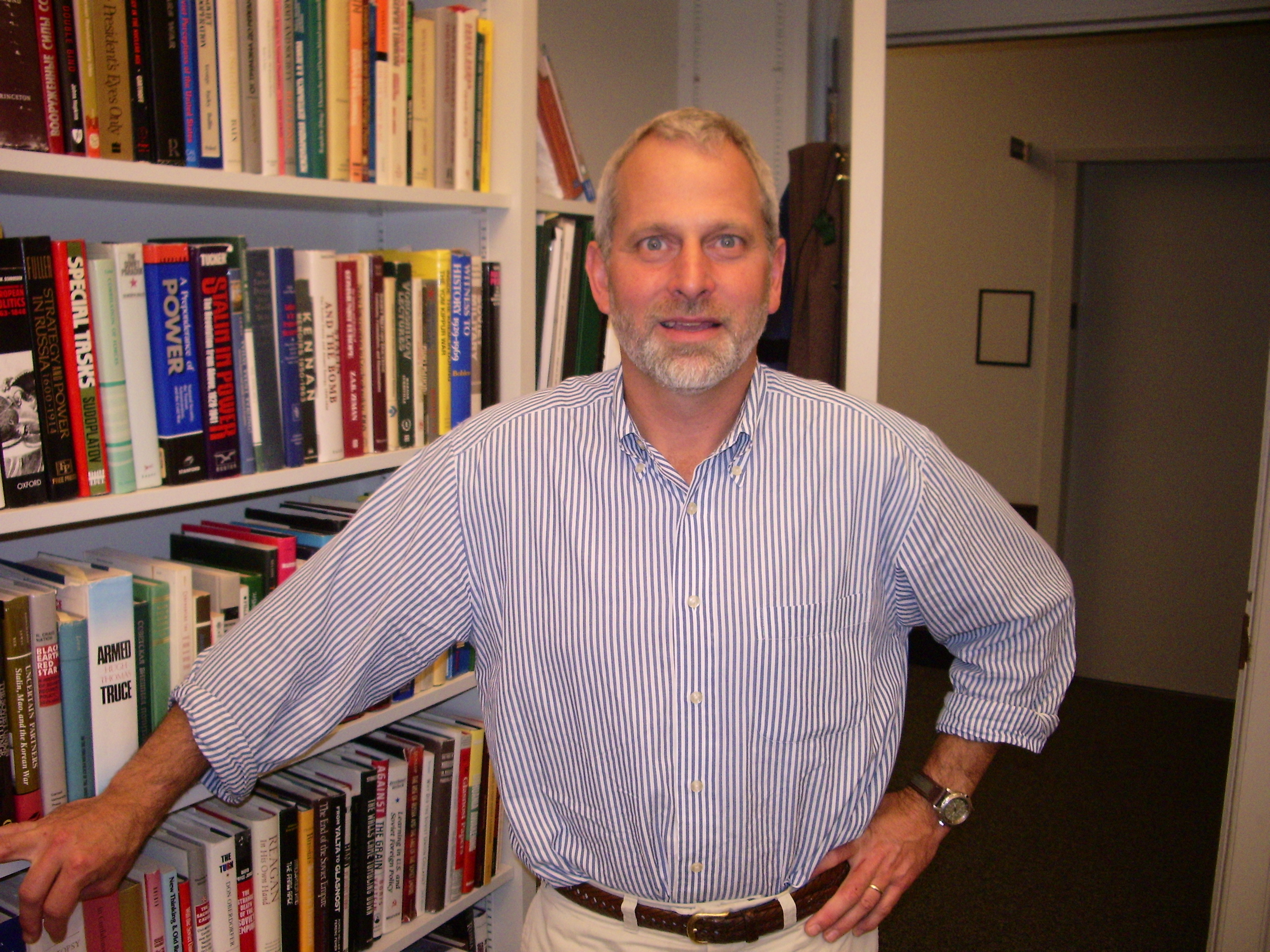
William Wohlforth

William Curti Wohlforth (born 1959) is an American political scientist. He is the Daniel Webster Professor of Government in the Dartmouth College Department of Government, of which he was chair for three academic years (2006-2009). Wohlforth was Editor-in-chief of Security Studies from 2008 to 2011. He is linked to the Neoclassical realism school and known for his work on American unipolarity.

== Academic career ==
Wohlforth received his bachelor's degree in International Relations (summa cum laude) from Beloit College. He went on to receive his Master's and Ph.D. from Yale University in International Relations as well.

He is the author of Elusive Balance: Power and Perceptions during the Cold War (Cornell, 1993) and editor of Witnesses to the End of the Cold War (Johns Hopkins, 1996) and Cold War Endgame: Oral History, Analysis, and Debates (Penn State, 2003).

Wohlforth's 1999 article "The Stability of a Unipolar World" and the book World Out of Balance: International Relations Theory and the Challenge of American Primacy (co-authored with Stephen G. Brooks) are influential in the field of international relations. In the article and book, Wohlforth challenges the view that US supremacy following the end of the Cold War will be short-lived.

== Publications ==
- A Measure Short of War: A Brief History of Great Power Subversion (Oxford, 2025) (with Jill Kastner)
- America Abroad: The United States’ Global Role in the 21 st Century (Oxford, 2016) (with Stephen G. Brooks)
- World Out of Balance: International Relations and the Challenge of American Primacy (Princeton University Press, 2008) (with Stephen G. Brooks)
- The Elusive Balance: Power and Perceptions During the Cold War (Cornell University Press, 1993)
