= Columbia University School of International and Public Affairs =

Public policy school of Columbia University

Coordinates: 40.807527°N 73.959682°W

- Type: Private (public policy school)
- Established: 1946
- Affiliations: APSIA
- Dean: Keren Yarhi-Milo
- Postgraduates: 1,030
- Location: New York City, New York, United States
- Campus: Urban
- Website: www.sipa.columbia.edu

The Columbia University School of International and Public Affairs (SIPA) is the international affairs and public policy school of Columbia University, a private Ivy League university located in Morningside Heights, Manhattan, New York City. SIPA offers Master of International Affairs (MIA) and Master of Public Administration (MPA) degrees in a range of fields, as well as the Executive MPA and PhD program in Sustainable Development.

SIPA's alumni include former heads of state, business leaders, journalists, diplomats, and elected representatives. Half of SIPA's nearly 1,400 students are international, coming from over 100 countries. SIPA has more than 70 full-time faculty, many of which include the world's leading scholars on international relations.

== History ==
The school's bulletin, listing programs and available courses, for 1980–82; shows an earlier form of the name and makes mention of the institutes

Columbia University's School of International Affairs was founded in 1946 following the aftermath of World War II. Emphasizing practical training, the mission of SIPA was to foster the understanding of critical regions and to prepare diplomats, officials, and other professionals to meet the complexities of the postwar world. It originated in dynamic regional institutes that drew on Columbia's renowned faculties in history, economics, political science, linguistics, and other traditional fields. The school initially awarded a Master of International Affairs (MIA) degree.

By 1967, the school was home to eight regional institutes, covering nearly every part of the globe. It also contained the non-area-specific Institute of War and Peace Studies (now the Arnold A. Saltzman Institute of War and Peace Studies), founded in 1951 by university president Dwight D. Eisenhower. Originally housed in a row of brownstones, the school moved into its own 15-story building in 1971.

To meet a growing demand for public service professionals, the school added a second degree, the Master of Public Administration, in 1977. In 1981, the program was renamed the Graduate Program in Public Policy and Administration and the school renamed the School of International and Public Affairs.

In the early 1990s, SIPA began appointing its own faculty, supplementing the distinguished social and natural scientists and humanists with whom SIPA students studied around the university. Within 15 years, SIPA faculty were among the most prominent in their fields, including the one-time director of the U.S. census, a Nobel Laureate in Economics, a judge on the appellate body of the World Trade Organization, economic advisors in both the Bill Clinton and George H. W. Bush administrations, a former assistant secretary general of the United Nations, and many distinguished research scholars.

In 1992, with support from the World Bank, the Program in Economic Policy Management (PEPM) was established to provide mid-career finance professionals with the skills required for the effective design and implementation of economic policy, emphasizing the problems of developing and transition economies. Students who complete PEPM's requirements are awarded an MPA degree.

To accommodate the needs of working professionals who could not pursue full-time study, SIPA established the Executive MPA program in 1999 as part of the Picker Center for Executive Education. In 2001 the school introduced an MPA in Environmental Science and Policy (ESP), which condenses the two years into twelve consecutive months, without a reduction in requirements, and provides core courses in management and policy analysis with a concentration in environmental science and earth systems. The ESP MPA program is offered in cooperation with The Earth Institute and the Lamont–Doherty Earth Observatory. In fall 2004 SIPA inaugurated its first doctoral program, the interdisciplinary Ph.D. in Sustainable Development, which combines elements of a traditional graduate education in social science, particularly economics, with a significant training in the natural sciences.

On March 23, 2022, current professor and director of the Saltzman Institute, Keren Yarhi-Milo was named dean.

== Academics ==
=== International dual-degree programs ===
SIPA offers a number of dual-degree programs with other schools of Columbia University and offers international dual degree programs with the London School of Economics and Political Science, Sciences Po, the Hertie School of Governance in Berlin, EAESP-FGV in São Paulo, the University of Tokyo and the Lee Kuan Yew School of Public Policy at the National University of Singapore through the Global Public Policy Network (GPPN).

=== Concentrations and specializations ===
In addition to fulfilling all core requirements, MIA and MPA students must also satisfy the requirements of both a policy concentration and a specialization. Students choose one of the following six concentrations: Economic and Political Development; Energy and Environment; International Finance and Economic Policy (includes focus areas in international finance; international economic policy; and central banking); Human Rights and Humanitarian Policy; International Security Policy; or Urban and Social Policy.

Students choose a specialization in one of the following: Data Analytics and Quantitative Analysis; Gender and Public Policy; International Conflict Resolution; International Organization and UN Studies; Technology, Media, and Communications; Management; or regional expertise (8 different regions/countries). Regional specializations are offered in the following areas: Africa, East Asia, East Central Europe, Europe, Latin America, The Middle East, Russia, South Asia, and the United States. The Advanced Policy and Economic Analysis (APEA) specialization was discontinued during the 2018–2019 academic year.

== Rankings and reputation ==
Foreign Policy ranked SIPA fifth in its 2018 ranking of "Top Master's Programs for Policy Career in International Relations". In addition, SIPA was ranked first by U.S. News & World Report Best Graduate Schools in the 2018, 2020, 2021, and 2022 world rankings for International Global Policy and Administration and fifth for Environmental Policy and Management. In 2023, and later in 2025, U.S. News & World Report ranked SIPA 1st in International Global Policy and Administration.

== Centers ==
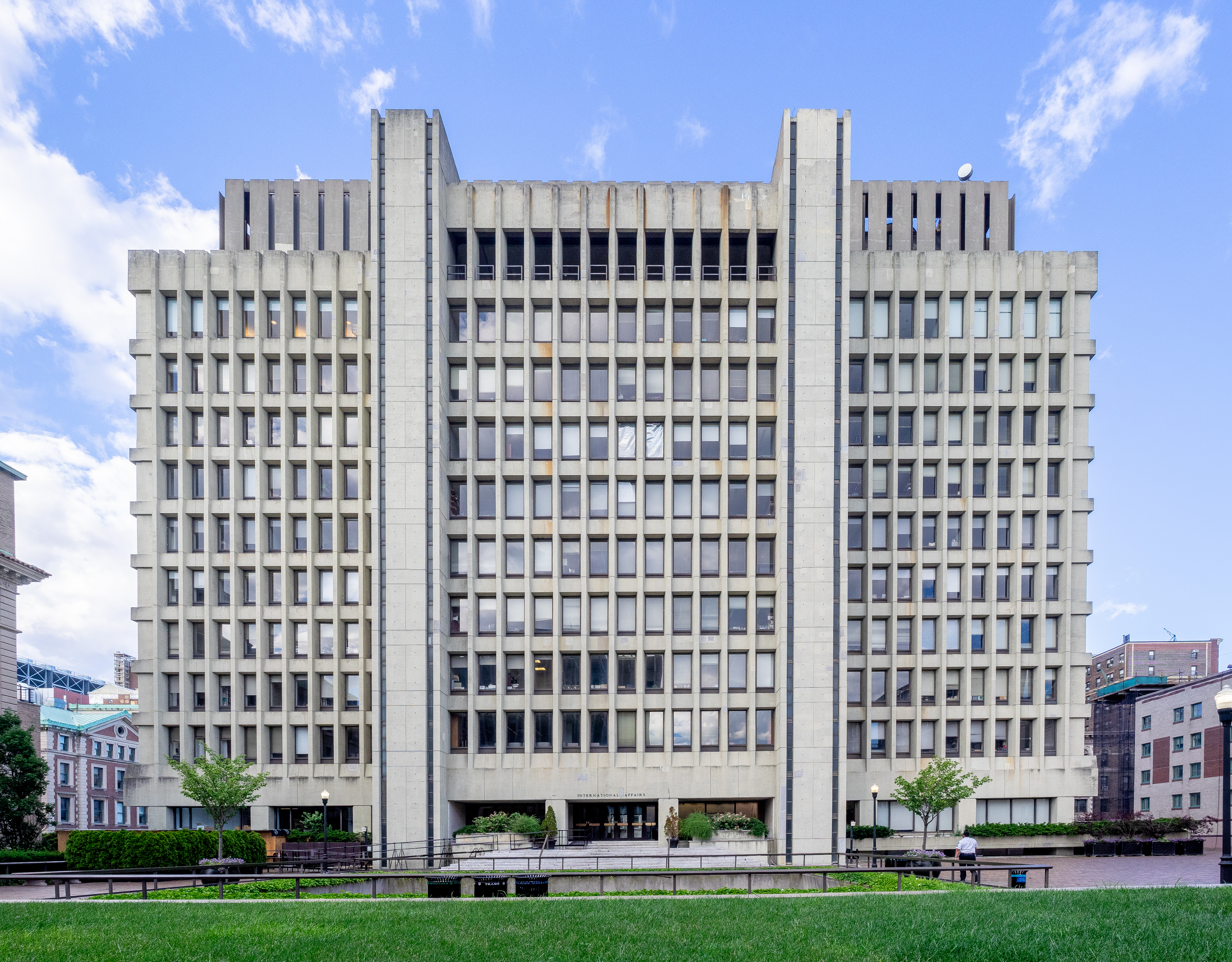
International Affairs Building

SIPA is home to seven centers:

- Center for Development Economics and Policy (CDEP): Supports microeconomic research to investigate the sources of poverty and to inform practical interventions to address them.
- Center for Environmental Economics and Policy (CEEP): Undertakes research into the causes of environmental change, the consequences of this change for humanity, and the policies that can prevent and—where possible—reverse harmful environmental change to ensure sustainable development.
- Center on Global Economic Governance (CGEG): Develops, promotes and implements new theories, studies, and policy initiatives that cut across nation-state boundaries and address global economic governance.
- Center on Global Energy Policy (CGEP): Provides independent, balanced, data-driven analysis to help policymakers navigate the complex world of energy.
- Deepak and Neera Raj Center on Indian Economic Policies (CIEP): Promotes economic prosperity in India by improving understanding of the Indian economy through scholarly research, disseminating this knowledge to practitioners and policymakers, and sustaining ongoing dialogues on major policy issues facing India.
- Institute of Global Politics (IGP): Drives impact on today's global challenges by convening leading scholars and practitioners, developing policy solutions, and preparing the next generation of leaders on five areas: geopolitical stability, democratic resilience, climate and sustainable development, inclusive prosperity and macroeconomic performance, and technology and innovation.
- Saltzman Institute of War and Peace Studies (SIWPS): Founded in 1951 under the sponsorship of Dwight D. Eisenhower, during his tenure as president of Columbia University, SIWPS was created to promote understanding of the "disastrous consequences of war upon man's spiritual, intellectual, and material progress". The institute has become one of the leading research centers on international relations in the United States.

Previous centers include:

- Center for International Conflict Resolution (CICR): Contributes to the resolution of international deadly conflict through research, education and practice. It was founded in 1997 by professor Andrea Bartoli as the International Conflict Resolution Program. The center was renamed in 2002 and is a research center in the Saltzman Institute of War and Peace Studies.

== Publications ==
Journal of International Affairs was established in 1947 and is the oldest university-affiliated publication in the field of international relations; it is edited by SIPA students.

The Morningside Post is SIPA's student-founded, student-run multimedia news publication. Its content: student-written investigative news about SIPA and the SIPA community, plus world affairs analysis, opinion, and satire.

Conflict Resolution Journal is a dynamic and evolving web-based project founded by SIPA students.

SIPA News is a biannual publication featuring articles by faculty, students, and alumni as well as news about the school.

== Notable alumni ==
- Penny Abeywardena, former Commissioner of NYC's Mayor's Office for International Affairs
- Alice P. Albright, CEO of the Millennium Challenge Corporation
- Madeleine Albright, former United States Secretary of State
- Joseph Kofi Adda, Former Member of Ghanaian Parliament for Navrongo Central and Former Ghanaian Minister for Energy
- Karen Attiah, Global Opinions editor for The Washington Post
- Bill de Blasio, 109th Mayor of New York City and former Public Advocate
- Clémence Boulouque, French scholar of political science and professor of Jewish studies at Columbia University
- Ibrahim Agboola Gambari, Minister of External Affairs of Nigeria and UN Under-Secretary-General for Political Affairs
- Jose Ramos Horta (graduate student), President of East Timor (2007–2012; 2022-present); former prime minister; Nobel Laureate
- Robert L. Belknap, scholar of Fyodor Dostoevsky, former director of the Harriman Institute, acting dean of Columbia College
- Howard Warren Buffett, former policy advisor (for Barack Obama), executive director of the Howard G. Buffett Foundation
- Wang Boming, editor-in-chief of China's Caijing magazine
- William Clark Jr., former U.S. Ambassador to India
- Hagar Chemali, political satirist, writer, producer, television personality, and political commentator
- Fotini Christia, Ford International Professor of the Social Sciences at Massachusetts Institute of Technology
- Julie J. Chung, U.S. diplomat
- Monica Crowley, Assistant Secretary of Public Affairs at the U.S. Department of Treasury
- Ina Drew, former Chief Investment Officer for J.P. Morgan; forced to resign after JPM suffered a trading loss of $2 billion in April/May 2012
- Pamela Druckerman, writer and freelance journalist
- Alejandro Eder, Mayor of Cali, Colombia
- Daniel Fried, Assistant U.S. Secretary of State for European and Eurasian Affairs
- Steven Fulop, Mayor of Jersey City, New Jersey
- Eric Garcetti, Mayor of Los Angeles
- Bonnie Glick, former Deputy Administrator of the United States Agency for International Development
- Nellie Gorbea, Secretary of State of Rhode Island
- Victor Gotbaum, Head of DC37, the largest municipal union in New York City
- Mareva Grabowski-Mitsotakis, business executive and spouse of the Prime Minister of Greece
- Patricia M. Haslach, former U.S. Ambassador to Laos
- Michael Hirsh, former foreign editor, chief diplomatic correspondent and national economic correspondent for Newsweek
- Jingdong Hua, Treasurer and Vice President of the International Finance Corporation
- Joe Hurd, Global Managing Director of SOSV and former Commerce Department political appointee in the Obama administration
- Sara Jacobs, U.S. Congresswoman for California's 53rd congressional district
- Deborah Lee James, 23rd U.S. Secretary of the Air Force
- Letitia James, New York Attorney General former Public Advocate
- Karine Jean-Pierre, White House Press Secretary
- Roula Khalaf, editor-in-chief, Financial Times
- Abraham Katz (1926–2013), diplomat, United States Ambassador to the OECD
- David Kay, Chief UN weapons inspector and head of Iraq Survey Group
- Glenn Kessler (journalist), Washington Post reporter and author
- Leo KoGuan, Chinese American billionaire, founder of SHI International Corp, third largest shareholder in Tesla, Inc.
- Stephen Krasner, Director for Policy Planning at the U.S. Department of State and Professor of International Relations at Stanford University
- Anna Lappé, Sustainable food advocate
- Jean Paul Laurent, non-profit founder
- Edward Luck, United Nations expert and SIPA professor
- Gunnar Lund, Ambassador of Sweden to France (2008–present); formerly to the United States
- Lorie K. Logan, 14th President and CEO of the Federal Reserve Bank of Dallas
- Nancy McEldowney, National Security Advisor to Vice President Kamala Harris & former Director of the Foreign Service Institute
- Mark A. Milley, 39th Chief of Staff of the United States Army and 20th Chairman of the Joint Chiefs of Staff
- Jim Nicholson, former U.S. Secretary of Veterans Affairs
- Michael Oren, Israeli ambassador to the United States
- David Pekoske, Administrator of the Transportation Security Administration
- Santiago Peña, 59th President of Paraguay
- Michael Pettis, American economist, professor at Guanghua School of Management
- Eunice Reddick, former US ambassador to Gabon, São Tomé and Príncipe, and later Niger
- Robert D. Reischauer, Director of the U.S. Congressional Budget Office
- Curtis Roosevelt, international civil servant and professor
- James Rubin, Assistant Secretary of State for Public Affairs and Chief Spokesman for the State Department (August 1997–April 2000)
- Vuslat Doğan Sabancı, billionaire Turkish businesswoman and chairwoman of Hürriyet
- Salim Ahmed Salim, Prime Minister of Tanzania, Secretary General of the Organization of African Unity, President of the United Nations General Assembly
- Elissa Slotkin, former U.S. Assistant Secretary of Defense for International Security Affairs and Congresswoman for Michigan's 8th Congressional District
- William E. Schaufele Jr., former U.S. representative, UN Security Council; former Ambassador to Poland
- Brent Scowcroft, United States National Security Advisor to Presidents Gerald Ford and George H. W. Bush
- Andrew J. Shapiro Assistant Secretary of State for Political-Military Affairs (2009–2013)
- Claire Shipman, ABC News correspondent, Acting Interim President of Columbia University
- Sichan Siv, former U.S. Deputy Secretary of State, former U.S. Ambassador to the United Nations Economic and Social Council (ECOSOC)
- Richard Mills Smith, CEO of Newsweek
- Frank Snepp, journalist and former CIA analyst
- Joan E. Spero, President of the Doris Duke Charitable Foundation and Undersecretary of State for Economic, Business, and Agricultural Affairs
- Katie Stanton, head of international strategy, Twitter
- Puneet Talwar, Assistant Secretary of State for Political-Military Affairs and United States Ambassador to Morocco
- George Tenet, former Director of the Central Intelligence Agency
- Tian Huiyu, CEO of China Merchants Bank
- Jens Ulltveit-Moe, Founder and CEO of Umoe AS
- Alexander Vershbow, Deputy Secretary General of NATO and former Assistant Secretary of Defense for International Security Affairs
- Daniel E. White, former deputy assistant secretary of Homeland Security for strategy & policy planning
- Ross Wilson, U.S. Ambassador to Turkey
- Brian Wynter, Governor of the Bank of Jamaica
- Donald Yamamoto, Principal Deputy Assistant Secretary of State and former ambassador to Ethiopia
- Peter Zalmayev, human rights activist and Director of the Eurasia Democracy Initiative

== Notable current faculty ==
- Rohit Aggarwala, commissioner of the New York City Department of Environmental Protection
- Séverine Autesserre, expert on peacebuilding and peacekeeping
- Scott Barrett, professor of natural resource economics
- John Battelle, media entrepreneur, co-founding editor of Wired
- Chris Blattman, development economist, blogger
- Jagdish Bhagwati, trade economist
- Richard K. Betts, prominent political scientist and former director of the Saltzman Institute of War and Peace Studies
- J. Bowyer Bell, historian, artist, and art critic
- Stephen Biddle, author, historian, policy analyst
- Akeel Bilgrami, philosopher of language and of mind
- Sandra Black, economist, former member of the Council of Economic Advisers
- Jason Bordoff, founding dean of Columbia Climate School
- Ian Bremmer, founder of Eurasia Group
- Howard Warren Buffett, research scholar, grandson of Warren Buffett
- Charles Calomiris, financial policy expert
- Guillermo Calvo, economist for macroeconomics and monetary economics, famous for Calvo (staggered) contracts
- Mauricio Cárdenas Santamaría, 69th Minister of Finance and Public Credit and former Minister of Mines and Energy of Colombia
- Thomas J. Christensen, China expert
- Richard Clarida, former Vice Chair of the Federal Reserve
- Hillary Rodham Clinton, former United States Secretary of State and former First Lady of the United States
- John Henry Coatsworth, former provost of Columbia University, Latin American expert
- Steven A. Cohen, former director of The Earth Institute
- Mamadou Diouf, historian
- Michael W. Doyle, the theorist of the liberal "democratic peace"
- Albert Fishlow, noted expert on Brazil and former Deputy Assistant Secretary of State for Inter-American Affairs
- Howard Steven Friedman, Health Economist and Statistician at the United Nations
- Ester Fuchs, urban and social policy expert
- Geoffrey M. Heal, British-American economist known for contributions to environmental economics
- Christopher R. Hill, former United States Ambassador to Iraq and dean of the Josef Korbel School of International Studies
- Merit Janow, the only North American member of the WTO appellate body; former Deputy Assistant U.S. Trade Representative for Japan and China (1990–1993)
- Robert Jervis, one of the most influential international relations scholars, expert on foreign policy analysis and political psychology
- Rashid Khalidi, historian and former director of SIPA's Middle East Institute
- Kenneth Lipper, former deputy mayor of New York City, financier, novelist, and screenwriter
- John Liu, former New York City Comptroller and current member of the New York State Senate
- Mark M. Lowenthal, former Assistant Director of Central Intelligence for Analysis and Production and Deputy Assistant Secretary of State for Intelligence Research
- Edward Luck, expert on the United Nations
- William H. Luers, retired career diplomat and museum executive
- Mahmood Mamdani, leading Africa scholar
- Jack F. Matlock Jr., former U.S. Ambassador to the Soviet Union
- Keren Yarhi-Milo, political scientist and director of the Arnold A. Saltzman Institute of War and Peace Studies
- Michael Nutter, 98th Mayor of Philadelphia
- Michael E. O'Hanlon, defense researcher at The Brookings Institution
- José Antonio Ocampo, former UN Under-Secretary-General for Economic and Social Affairs
- Mary Robinson, the first female President of the Republic of Ireland; United Nations High Commissioner for Human Rights
- Arvind Panagariya, professor of economics
- Kenneth Prewitt, political scientist and former director of the United States Census Bureau
- David Rothkopf, chairman and CEO of The Rothkopf Group, and Garten Rothkopf, and former Deputy Undersecretary of Commerce for International Trade
- Jeffrey Sachs, chief economic advisor to many governments, former Director of the UN Millennium Project, Special Advisor to United Nations Secretary-General on the Millennium Development Goals
- Giovanni Sartori, Albert Schweitzer Professor Emeritus in the Humanities at Columbia University
- Stephen Sestanovich, former Ambassador-at-large and Special Advisor to the Secretary of State on the New Independent States (NIS)
- Gary Sick, Iran expert and three-time member of the National Security Council
- David Siegel - Adjunct Professor of Entrepreneurial, Organizational and Strategic Management; former CEO of Investopedia
- David C. Stark, professor of sociology
- Joseph Stiglitz, Nobel Prize-winning former Senior Vice President and Chief Economist of the World Bank and former chair of the President's Council of Economic Advisors
- Jan Švejnar, Czech-born economist, 2015 IZA Prize in Labor Economics holder, 2008 Czech Presidential election candidate
- Alan M. Taylor, external member of the Monetary Policy Committee of the Bank of England.

== Notable former faculty ==
- Lisa Anderson, former dean of SIPA and a leading expert on the Middle East; former president of the American University in Cairo
- Zbigniew Brzezinski, National Security Advisor under U.S. President Jimmy Carter
- David Dinkins, first African American mayor of New York City
- Ernst Jaeckh (1875–1959), German-born orientalist and founder of the Middle East Institute
- Robert C. Lieberman, former interim dean of SIPA and provost of the Johns Hopkins University
- John Ruggie, former dean of SIPA; former Assistant Secretary-General and chief advisor for strategic planning to United Nations Secretary-General Kofi Annan. He continues to serve as the UN Secretary General's Special Representative for Business and Human Rights
- Zalmay Khalilzad, former United States Ambassador to the United Nations
- Amina J. Mohammed, Deputy-Secretary-General of the United Nations and former Ministry of Environment of Nigeria
- Redmond Kathleen Molz, award winning author on federal library policy.

== Notable former international fellows ==
- Michael Armacost, diplomat, Deputy Secretary of State, president of Brookings Institution
- Bonnie Erbe, host of the PBS television show To the Contrary
- Harold Varmus, Nobel Prize winner, head of National Institute of Health
- Jim Hightower, progressive activist
- Richard M. Smith, chairman and editor-in-chief of Newsweek
- Frederick Kempe, president, Atlantic Council of the United States
