= Caixin =

Beijing-based media group

Caixin Media Company Ltd.

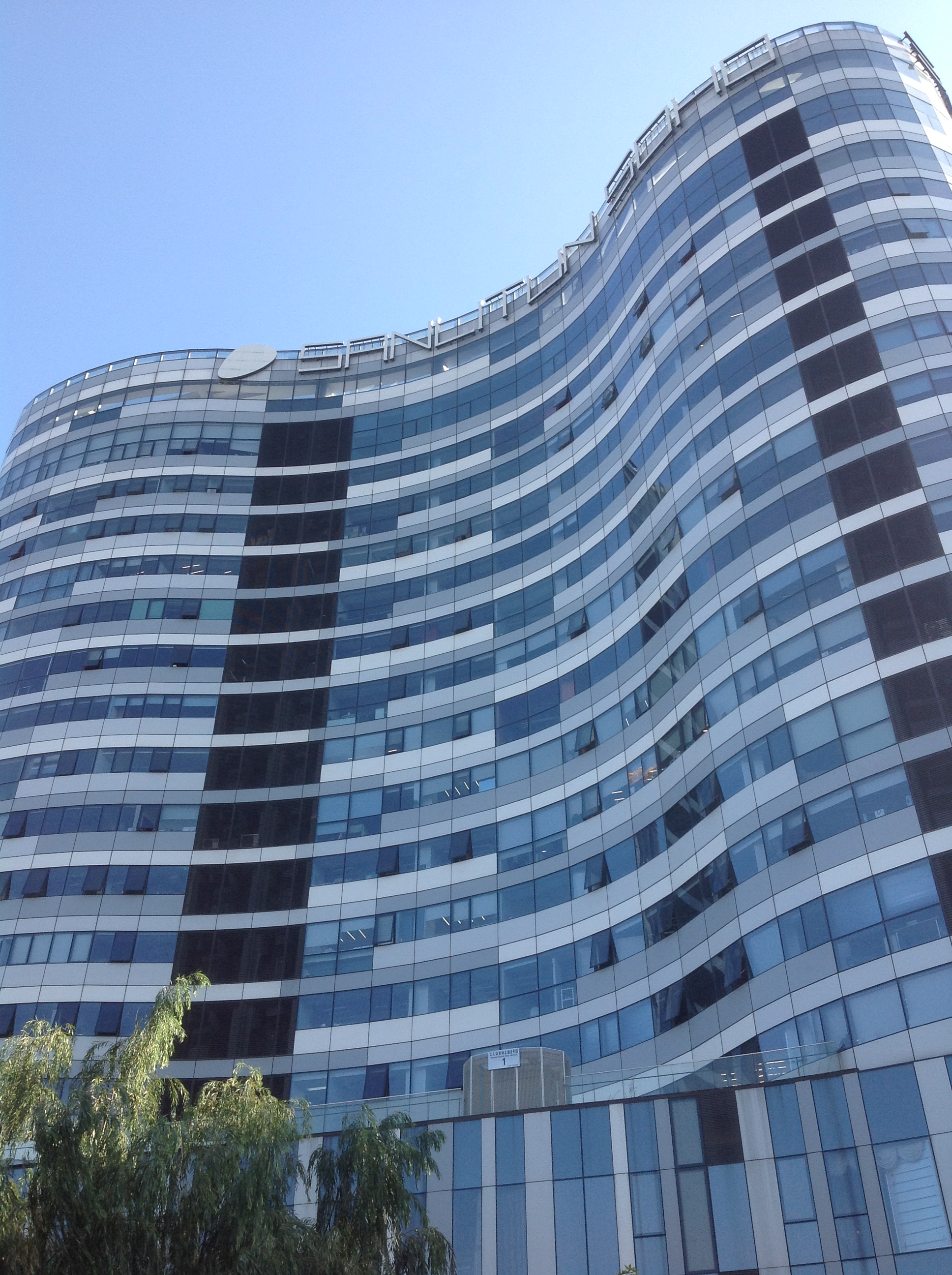
- Sanlitun, Beijing SOHO houses the headquarters of Caixin.
- Native name: 财新传媒
- Type: Privately held company
- Industry: News and publishing
- Founded: 2009; 17 years ago
- Headquarters: Chaoyang District, Beijing
- Key people: Li Ruigang (Chairman); Hu Shuli (President)
- Products: Caixin Weekly; Caixin Online
- Website: Caixin (Chinese); Caixin Global (English)

Caixin Media (simplified Chinese: 财新传媒; traditional Chinese: 財新傳媒; pinyin: Cáixīn Chuánméi; lit. 'New Fortune', pronounced t'sigh-sheen) is a Chinese media group based in Beijing known for business and investigative journalism.

== Structure ==
The founder and publisher is Hu Shuli, a former Knight Fellow in journalism at Stanford University, and an honorary doctorate degree recipient from Princeton University. Previously, Hu founded Caijing magazine, and Wang Shuo is editor-in-chief.

The headquarters is in the Sanlitun SOHO (三里屯SOHO) in Chaoyang District, Beijing. There are also offices in Xuhui District, Shanghai and Quarry Bay, Hong Kong.

== History ==
=== Departure from Caijing Magazine ===
Caixin Media was established in January 2010, created subsequently to the departure of Hu Shuli and the majority of the editors and reporters at Caijing Magazine in November 2009. The original staff of Caixin Media is composed entirely of employees from Caijing.

Caijing is a financial news magazine. It was founded by Hu Shuli in 1998 and was managed by the Stock Exchange Executive Council (SEEC) whose chairman is Wang Boming, The magazine largely depends on the political protection by SEEC, its well-connected backer.

In November 2009, Hu Shuli resigned from Caijing along with a large portion of Caijing's journalists after weeks of conflicts with Caijing's controller over issues including "its coverage of sensitive current affairs stories". The magazine was known for its investigative reporting and in-depth business articles; but its backer, according to departing employees, wanted it "to move away from investigative journalism towards straight coverage of business, in the mode of Fortune". The pressure to focus on finance had mounted substantially since the explosion of ethnic violence in Xinjiang in July 2009; reporters at Caijing received orders from SEEC to remove sensitive stories. Besides that, there were also disputes over wages. Jeremy Goldkorn called Hu's departure from Caijing "a big loss for SEEC".

Caixin launched a simple English-language news site called "Caixin Online" in 2010, translating a small number of its Chinese stories each day for foreign readers. In 2016, it greatly expanded that presence with the establishment of a separate company called Caixin Global, with Hu Shuli as CEO and Li Xin as managing director. It included a new English language news app, a new English language website (www.caixinglobal.com) upgraded from Caixin Online, and a range of customized business intelligence services under the banner of Caixin Global Intelligence.

The Caixin China PMI is an economic index compiled and published monthly by IHS Markit; it is often cited by market watchers and media. Caixin Media took over sponsorship of Markit's China PMI from HSBC in 2015, and the research team of Caixin Insight provides analysis for the index.

In April 2018, Caixin Global and CITIC Capital jointly acquired the international business information unit of Britain's Euromoney for $180.5 million, marking one of the biggest offshore purchases ever by a mainstream Chinese media company. The unit, Global Market Intelligence Division (GMID), was a provider of global financial information and data in over 15 languages, with a focus on emerging markets. GMID's two main units are CEIC and EMIS.

At the 2026 Caixin Summer Summit, Caixin officially launched the “Caixin Global Forum” and its international advisory committee. This unified platform incorporates the Caixin Summit (Beijing), Caixin Summer Summit (Hong Kong), Asia New Vision Forum (Singapore), London Atlantic Dialogue, and multiple high-level roundtable sessions, building a year-round global dialogue framework that spans key international hubs.

=== Establishment of Caixin ===
Two months after splitting with Caijing, Hu Shuli established Caixin Media and became the executive editor of a new publication called Caixin Weekly.

Caixin Media was financed by various parties. Hu secured a 40-million yuan investment from Zhejiang Daily Press Group, the state-owned newspaper conglomerate, for a 40 percent stake in Caixin. Zhejiang Daily had sought to sell a 19.77 percent stake in Caixin for 56 million yuan in 2011, but later withdrew the sale. In July 2012, Tencent became Caixin's newest stockholder with an undisclosed amount of shares. In December 2013, China Media Capital (CMC) said that it had purchased a 40% stake in Caixin Media from Zhejiang Daily Press Group, thus becoming the largest shareholder. Li Ruigang, the chairman of CMC, said, "My fund and I are very honored to become a part of Caixin"; "Our common goal is to build a China-based financial media platform with international influences."

=== Introduction of paywall ===
Caixin Media initially offered content from its website, caixin.com, and its mobile app for free, but charged for the electronic version of its signature magazine. On 6 November 2017, it set up a paywall for caixin.com, becoming the first major Chinese publication to put most of its online content behind a paywall.

The paywall's introduction was part of Caixin's efforts to protect content from copyright infringement and to boost revenue. In May 2018, Hu Shuli, in a speech to students at Renmin University of China, said that many readers had subscribed since testing of the paywall model began in 2016, proving that the market had a positive response to the paywall model.

In an interview in November 2018, one year after the paywall's introduction, Hu Shuli said Caixin had more than 200,000 digital annual subscribers. Caixin's Chinese language website caixin.com receives approximately 130 million page views per month from 50 million unique visitors. Hu said that readership had risen steadily.

In June 2022, Caixin has around 850,000 digital subscribers, according to a new ranking by the International Federation of Periodical Publishers (FIPP). Caixin subscriptions have grown 21% since the first half of 2021, meaning it has overtaken Nikkei.com to become the world’s largest digital news subs business outside of the English-speaking world. Caixin Media's paid readership exceeded 900,000 at the end of October, after the outlet became the world's largest subscription-based media outside the U.K. and the U.S. earlier this year, Hu Shuli announced at the 13th Caixin Summit.

In June 2023, The International Federation of Periodical Publishers (FIPP) released the latest data from the 2023 Global Digital Subscription Report revealing that Caixin has exceeded 1 million paid subscribers, tied for eighth place in international rankings.

In May 2024, at the 2024 Caixin Summer Summit, Hu Shuli, President of Caixin Media, disclosed that Caixin now has over 1.2 million paid subscribers.

== Notable events ==
On 7 March 2016, Caixin published an article that exposed the Cyberspace Administration of China for removing an article on their Chinese website. The reasoning given for the take-down order was "illegal content". The censored article, originally published on 3 March, was about Jiang Hong, a member of the Chinese People's Political Consultative Conference, who said that advisors should be "free to give Communist Party and government agencies suggestions on economic, political, cultural and social issues". Publicly exposing such censorship was considered highly unusual in China, and Caixin deliberately referred to the CAC as "a government censorship organ".

On 11 November 2018, Caixin reporter Zhou Chen was harassed by police in her hotel room while on a trip to investigate a petrochemical leak in Quanzhou that sickened over 50 people. The incident prompted outrage on social media and a rare apology from the local police.

On 27 March 2020, doubts were raised about the accuracy of the reported COVID-19 death toll of 2,535 in Wuhan as Caixin published photos of a truck unloading 2,500 boxed funeral urns arriving from a Hankou funeral home and a further 3,500 boxed funeral urns inside Jingya Hall.

On 21 October 2021, the Cyberspace Administration of China removed Caixin from its seminal list of news media that can be re-published, substantially gagging it as a news source.
