= United Nations Commission on Human Rights =

Defunct functional commission of the United Nations

The United Nations Commission on Human Rights (UNCHR) was a functional commission within the overall framework of the United Nations from 1946 until it was replaced by the United Nations Human Rights Council in 2006. It was a subsidiary body of the UN Economic and Social Council (ECOSOC), and was also assisted in its work by the Office of the United Nations High Commissioner for Human Rights (UNOHCHR).

It was the UN's principal mechanism and international forum concerned with the promotion and protection of human rights. The UNCHR successfully introduced the Universal Declaration of Human Rights of 1948. The body's reputation became controversial over time, as many observers saw it as highly politicized and vulnerable to outside pressure. Scholars have found that states with a poor human rights record were more likely to be elected to the body than countries with good records.

On March 15, 2006, the UN General Assembly voted overwhelmingly to replace UNCHR with the UN Human Rights Council.

== History ==
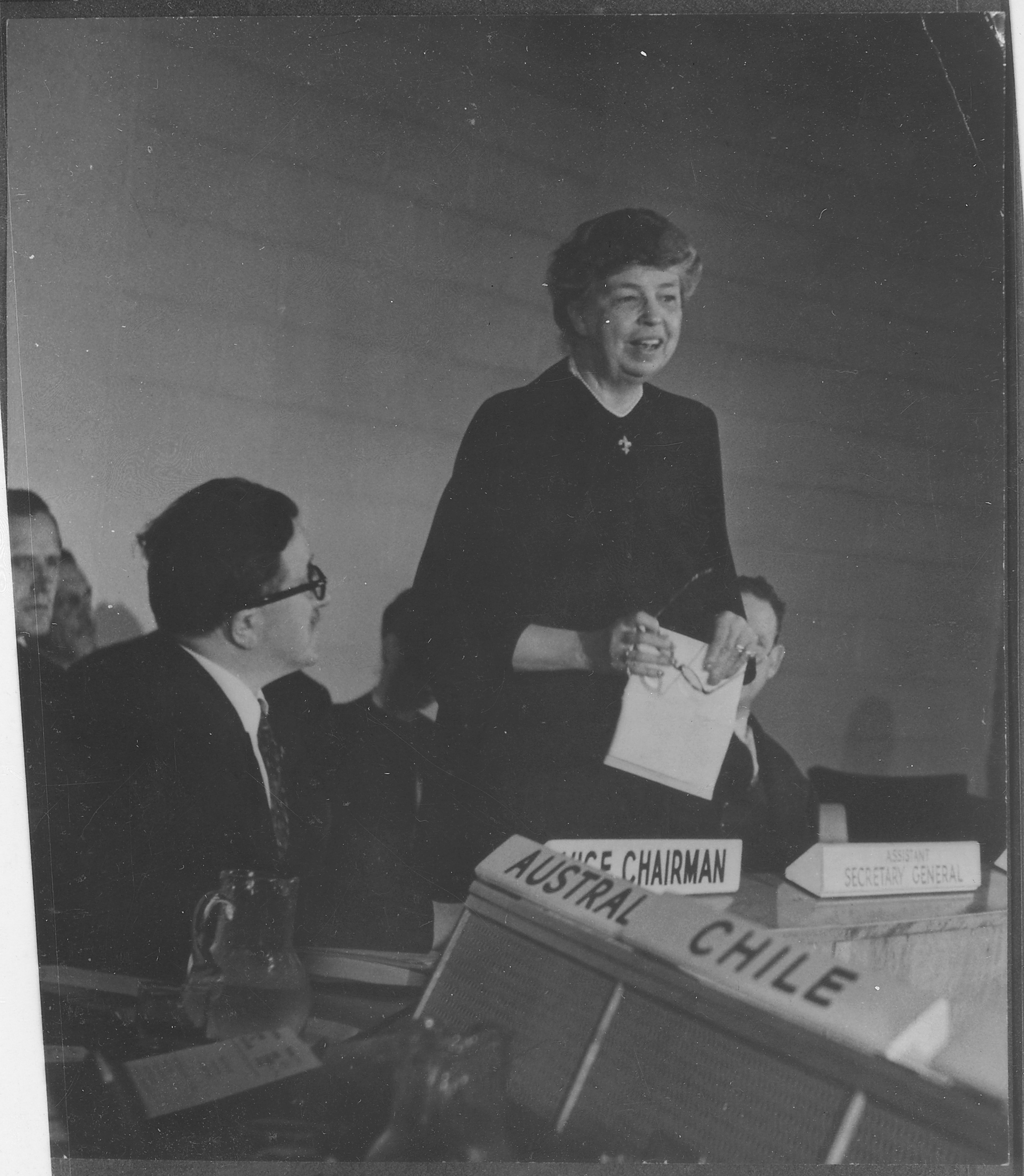
Eleanor Roosevelt at United Nations for Human Rights Commission meeting in Lake Success, New York, in 1947

The UNCHR was established in 1946 by ECOSOC, and was one of the first two "Functional Commissions" set up within the early UN structure (the other being the Commission on the Status of Women). It was a body created under the terms of the United Nations Charter (specifically, under Article 68) to which all UN member states are signatories.

It met for the first time in January 1947 and established a drafting committee for the Universal Declaration of Human Rights, which was adopted by the United Nations on December 10, 1948.

The body went through two distinct phases. From 1947 to 1967, it concentrated on promoting human rights and helping states elaborate treaties, but not on investigating or condemning violators. It was a period of strict observance of the sovereignty principle.

In 1967, the Commission adopted interventionism as its policy. The context of the decade was of Decolonization of Africa and Asia, and many countries of the continent pressed for a more active UN policy on human rights issues, especially in light of massive violations in apartheid South Africa. The new policy meant that the Commission would also investigate and produce reports on violations.

To allow better fulfillment of this new policy, other changes took place. In the 1970s, the possibility of geographically oriented workgroups was created. These groups would specialize in investigating violations in a particular region or even a single country, as was the case with Chile. With the 1980s came the creation of theme-oriented workgroups, which would specialize in specific types of abuses.

None of these measures, however, were able to make the Commission as effective as desired, mainly because of the presence of human rights violators and the politicization of the body. During the following years until its extinction, the UNCHR became increasingly discredited among activists and governments alike.

The Commission held its final meeting in Geneva on March 27, 2006, and was replaced by the United Nations Human Rights Council in the same year.

== Mandate ==
The Commission on Human Rights was intended to examine, monitor and publicly report on human rights situations in specific countries or territories (known as country mechanisms or mandates) as well as on major phenomena of human rights violations worldwide (known as thematic mechanisms or mandates). The Human Rights division of the U.N. is also expected to uphold and protect the Universal Declaration of Human Rights.

== Structure ==
At the time it was extinguished, the Commission consisted of representatives drawn from 53 member states, elected by the members of ECOSOC. There were no permanent members: each year (usually in May), approximately a third of its seats would come up for election and those chosen would be appointed for a three-year term.

Seats on the Commission were apportioned by region, using the mechanism of the United Nations Regional Groups. During its last year of service in 2005, the representation by region was as follows.

- 15 from the African Group:
  - Burkina Faso, Republic of the Congo, Egypt, Eritrea, Ethiopia, Gabon, Guinea, Kenya, Mauritania, Nigeria, South Africa, Sudan, Swaziland, Togo, Zimbabwe
- 12 from the Asian Group:
  - Bhutan, People's Republic of China, India, Indonesia, Japan, Malaysia, Nepal, Pakistan, Qatar, Republic of Korea, Saudi Arabia, Sri Lanka
- 5 from the Eastern European Group:
  - Armenia, Hungary, Romania, Russian Federation, Ukraine
- 11 from the Latin American and Caribbean Group:
  - Argentina, Brazil, Costa Rica, Cuba, Dominican Republic, Ecuador, Guatemala, Honduras, Mexico, Paraguay, Peru
- 10 from the Western European and Others Group:
  - Australia, Canada, Finland, France, Germany, Ireland, Italy, Netherlands, United Kingdom, United States

The Commission would meet each year in regular session for six weeks during March and April in Geneva, Switzerland. In January 2004, Australia was elected as chair of the 60th Session. In January 2005, Indonesia was elected chair of the 61st Session. Peru was elected chair of the 62nd Session in January 2006. The Commission held its final meeting in Geneva on March 27, 2006.

=== Chairs ===
#	Name	Country	Time
	Eleanor Roosevelt	United States of America	April 29, 1946 – December 30, 1952
	Charles Malik	Lebanon	December 30, 1952
	Mahmoud Azmi	Egypt	1953-1954
	René Cassin	France	1955-1956
	Felixberto Serrano	Philippines	1957
	Senerat Gunewardene	Sri Lanka	1958-1959
	Mario Amadeo	Argentina	1960
	C.S. Jha	India	1961
	Georges Hakim	Lebanon	1962
	Abdul Rahman Pazhwak	Afghanistan	1963
	Enrique Ponce y Carbo	Ecuador	1964
	Salvador P. Lopez	Philippines	1965
	Fernando Volio Jiménez	Costa Rica	1966
	Petr Emelyanovich Nedbailo	Ukrainian SSR	1967
	Ibrahima Boye	Senegal	1968
	R.Q. Quentin-Baxter	New Zealand	1969
	Ashraf Pahlavi	Iran	1970
	Andrés Aguilar	Venezuela	1971
	Engeniusz Kulaga	Poland	1972
	Radha Krishna Ramphul	Mauritius	1973
	Felix Ermacora	Austria	1974
	G. Allana	Pakistan	1975
	Leopoldo Benites	Ecuador	1976
	Aleksander Bozavic	Yugoslavia	1977
	Kéba Mbaye	Senegal	1978
	Yvon Beaulne	Canada	1979
	Waleed Saadi	Jordan	1980
	Carlos Calero Rodrigues	Brazil	1981
	Ivan Garvalov	Bulgaria	1982
	Olara Otunnu	Uganda	1983
	Pieter Kooijmans	Netherlands	1984
	Abu Sayeed Chowdhury	Bangladesh	1985
	Héctor Charry-Samper	Colombia	1986
	Leonid Evmenov	Byelorussian SSR	1987
	Alioune Sene	Senegal	1988
	Marc Bossuyt	Belgium	1989
	Purificacion Quisumbing	Philippines	1990
	Enrique Bernales Ballesteros	Peru	1991
	Pál Solt	Hungary	1992
	Mohamed Ennaceur	Tunisia	1993
	Peter van Wulfften Palthe	Netherlands	1994
	Musa Hitam	Malaysia	1995
	Gilberto Saboia	Brazil	1996
	Miroslav Somol	Czech Republic	1997
	Jacob Selebi	South Africa	1998
	Anne Anderson	Ireland	1999
	Shambhu Ram	Nepal	2000
	Leandro Despouy	Argentina	2001
	Krzysztof Jakubowski	Poland	2002
	Najat Al-Hajjaji	Libyan Arab Jamahiriya	2003
	Mike Smith	Australia	2004
	Makarim Wibisono	Indonesia	2005
	Manuel Rodríguez Cuadros	Peru	2006

== Sub-Commission on the Promotion and Protection of Human Rights ==
Originally known as the Sub-Commission on Prevention of Discrimination and Protection of Minorities, this sub-commission became the Sub-Commission on the Promotion and Protection of Human Rights in 1999. The sub-commission was the main subsidiary body of the Commission on Human Rights. It was composed of twenty-six experts whose responsibility was to undertake studies, particularly in light of the Universal Declaration of Human Rights, and make recommendations to the Commission concerning the prevention of discrimination of any kind relating to human rights and fundamental freedoms and the protection of racial, national, religious and linguistic minorities. Membership was selected with regard to equitable geographical distribution.

The Sub-Commission established seven Working Groups to investigate specific human rights concerns, including:

- Minorities
- Transnational Corporations
- Administration of Justice
- Anti-terrorism
- Contemporary Forms of Slavery
- Indigenous Populations
- Communication
- Social Forum

The United Nations Human Rights Council assumed responsibility for the Sub-Commission when it replaced the Commission on Human Rights in 2006.

== Special procedures ==
The Commission on Human Rights established 30 special procedures, or mechanisms, to address specific country situations or thematic issues such as freedom of expression and opinion, torture, the right to food, and the right to education.

Individuals with expertise in particular areas of human rights were appointed by the chair of the Commission to serve as Special Rapporteurs for a maximum of six years. They are unpaid, independent experts who receive personnel and logistical support from the Office of the High Commissioner for Human Rights for their work. Their main activities are to examine, monitor, advise and publicly report on human rights situations in specific countries or territories. They are able to write to governments about reported violations and conduct fact-finding visits to countries that invite them.

The special mechanisms are categorised according to thematic and country mandates.

Special procedures also include working groups made up of up to five experts who monitor and investigate specific human rights concerns. Three groups were established by the Commission:

- Working Group on Arbitrary Detention
- Working Group on Enforced or Involuntary Disappearances
- Working Group on the use of mercenaries as a means of impeding the exercise of the right of peoples to self-determination

The special procedures are now under the direction of the United Nations Human Rights Council.

== Criticism ==
The Commission was repeatedly criticized for the composition of its membership. In particular, several of its member countries themselves had dubious human rights records, including states whose representatives had been elected to chair the Commission. Countries with records of human rights abuses like torture, extrajudicial killings, political imprisonment, and disappearances likely sought election to the Commission to project a positive international image. Commission membership also provided some political shelter from criticism of these abuses.

Another criticism was that the Commission did not engage in constructive discussion of human rights issues, but was a forum for politically selective finger-pointing and criticism. The desire of states with problematic human rights records to be elected to the Commission was viewed largely as a way to defend themselves from such attacks.

Activist groups had long expressed concern over the memberships of the China, Zimbabwe, Russia, Saudi Arabia, and Pakistan, and the past memberships of Algeria, Syria, Libya, Uganda, and Vietnam on the Commission. These countries had extensive records of human rights violations, and one concern was that by working against resolutions on the Commission condemning human rights violations, they indirectly promoted despotism and domestic repression.

On May 4, 2004, United States Ambassador Sichan Siv walked out of the Commission following the uncontested election of Sudan to the commission and called it an "absurdity" in light of Sudan's ethnic cleansing in Darfur. One major consequence of the election of Sudan to the Commission was the lack of willingness of some countries to work through the Commission. For example, on July 30, 2004, it was the United Nations Security Council, not the Commission, that passed a resolution—by 13–0, with China and Pakistan abstaining, threatening Sudan with unspecified sanctions if the situation in the Darfur region did not improve within the following 30 days. The reasons given for the action were the attacks by the Janjaweed Arab militias of Sudan on the non-Arab African Muslim population of Darfur, a region in western Sudan.

The Commission had also come under repeated criticism from the United States for its unwillingness to address other human rights concerns. In 2001, the United States was voted off the Commission by the other member states, many of which have been criticized for their human rights violations, and in 2003, Syria put forward a proposal to discuss US war crimes in Iraq. However, the American journalist Anne Applebaum wrote that "the European Union and the United States aren't exempt from blame, either." She cited their hesitance in voting to criticize Russia's actions in Chechnya.

=== Israel ===
The Commission was also criticized by advocates of Israel for bias against Israel. In 2002, Anne Bayefsky, a professor of international law at York University in Toronto, wrote that "commission members seek to avoid directly criticizing states with human rights problems, frequently by focusing on Israel, a state that, according to analysis of summary records, has for over 30 years occupied 15 percent of commission time and has been the subject of a third of country-specific resolutions". On April 15, 2002, the Commission approved a resolution affirming the "legitimate right of the Palestinian people to resist the Israeli occupation in order to free its land and be able to exercise its right of self-determination". In so doing, the Palestinian people was declared "fulfilling its mission, one of the goals and purposes of the United Nations". Of the 53-member commission, 40 countries voted yes, five voted no, and seven abstained. Although widely reported that the resolution condoned resistance to Israel by "all available means, including armed struggle", the resolution itself does not contain those words. Alfred Moses, a former United States ambassador to the Commission who is now the chairman of the monitoring group UN Watch, said, "A vote in favour of this resolution is a vote for Palestinian terrorism." In a letter to the Commission on November 15, 2002, following an attack by Palestinians on Israelis in the town of Hebron, Nabil Ramlawi, the Permanent Observer for Palestine at the UN, appealed to the resolution as justification for the attack.

=== Human rights and mental health ===
In 1977, the Commission formed a "Sub-Commission to study, with a view to formulating guidelines, if possible, the question of the protection of those detained on the grounds of mental ill-health against treatment that might adversely affect the human personality and its physical and intellectual integrity." The sub-commission was charged with "determin[ing] whether adequate grounds existed for detaining persons on the grounds of mental ill-health." The guidelines that resulted, UN Principles for the Protection of Persons with Mental Illness and for the Improvement of Mental Health Care, have been criticized for ignoring and failing to protect the rights of involuntary patients.

== Genocide ==
The United Nations Commission on Human Rights (UNCHR) passed a number of resolutions concerning genocide: UNCHR Decision 9 (XXXV); 1986/18; 1987/25; 1988/28; 1989/16; 1990/19; "Fiftieth Anniversary of the Convention on the Prevention and Punishment of the Crime of Genocide", 1998/10; and "Convention on the Prevention and Punishment of the Crime of Genocide", 1999/67.

In 1978 the UNCHR endorsed the recommendation of the Sub-Commission on Prevention of Discrimination and Protection of Minorities to distribute widely the Ruhashyankiko Report.

In August 1992, the UNCHR "condemn[ed] absolutely the concept and practice of 'ethnic cleansing'" in the former Yugoslavia but did not describe it as genocide. The Commission's resolution was endorsed by the UNCHR parent body, the United Nations Economic and Social Council. In November 1992, the UNCHR "call[ed] upon all States to consider the extent to which the acts committed in Bosnia ... and in Croatia constitute genocide in accordance with [the Genocide Convention]".

At the request of Canada in May 1994, an emergency meeting was convened to deal with the ongoing genocide in Rwanda. René Degni-Segui was appointed as a Special Rapporteur, immediately visited Rwanda and promptly issued a report on the scope of the genocide.

== See also ==
- United Nations Human Rights Committee
