= Mermelstein =

Mermelstein is a surname. Notable people with the surname include:

- Edward Mermelstein (born 1967), American lawyer
- Jeff Mermelstein (born 1957), American photographer
- Max Mermelstein (1942–2008), American drug trafficker
- Mel Mermelstein (1926-2022), Hungarian-born Holocaust survivor
- Nermalstein (born 1979) Character from the Garfield franchise
