= Scott Barrett =

Scott Barrett may refer to:

- Scott Barrett (footballer) (born 1963), English former professional footballer
- Scott Barrett (political scientist), professor of natural resource economics at Columbia University
- Scott Barrett (politician), Australian politician
- Scott Barrett (rugby union) (born 1993), New Zealand rugby union player
