= Olesia Zhytkova =

Ukrainian historian (born 1992)

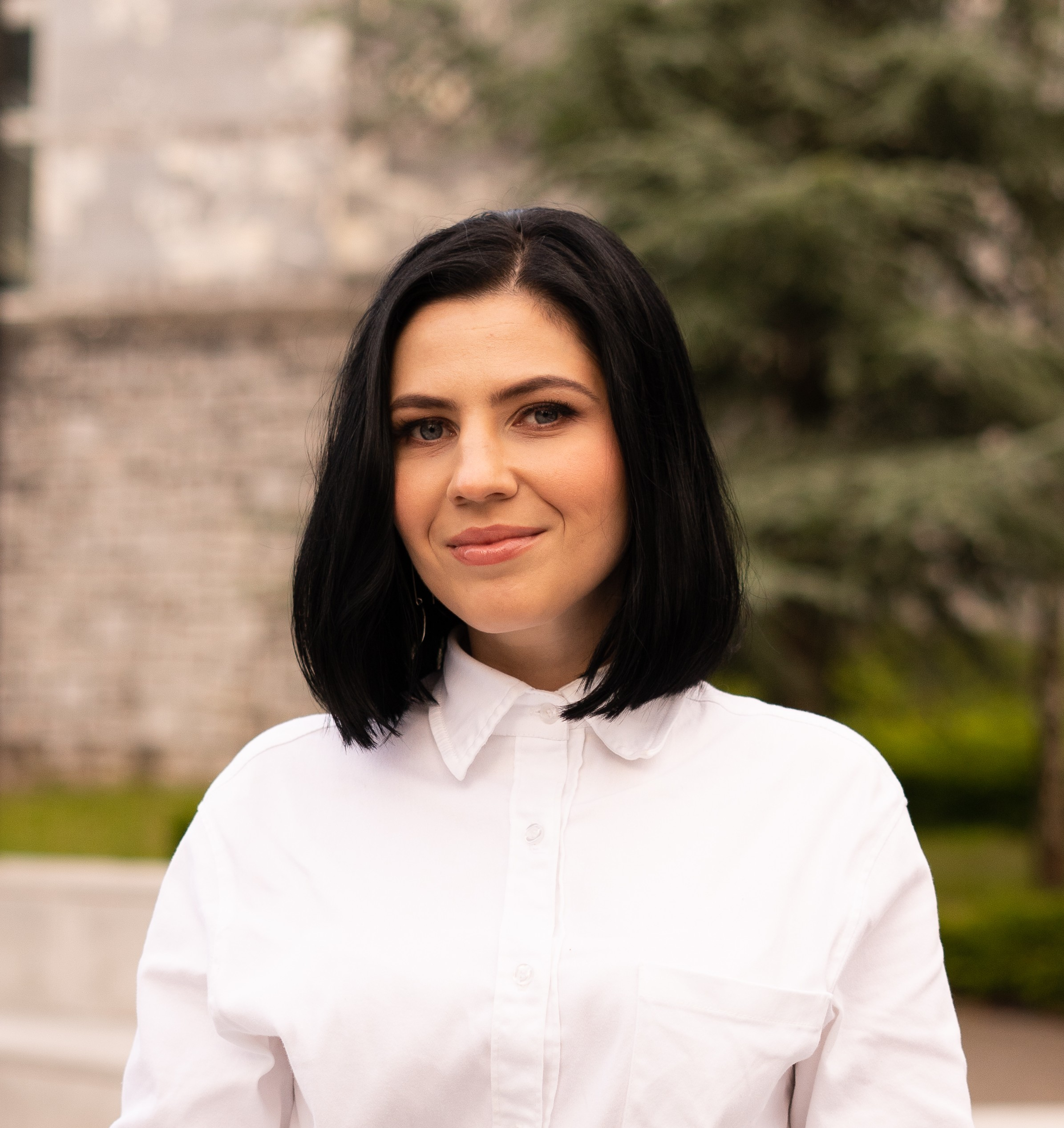
- Born: September 10, 1992 (age 34); Kropyvnytskyi, Ukraine
- Spouse: Kim Samusenka (m. 2019)

Academic background
- Education: Taras Shevchenko National University of Kyiv (MA, PhD)
- Thesis: Activity of the UAOC in Kyiv (1919-1930) (2019)
- Doctoral advisor: Andrii Pyzhyk

Academic work
- Discipline: History
- Sub-discipline: Contemporary history of Ukraine
- Institutions: Dublin City University

Olesia Zhytkova (Ukrainian: Житкова Олеся Олександрівна; born September 10, 1992, Kropyvnytskyi) is a Ukrainian historian, human rights activist and member of the Ukrainian diaspora in Ireland.

== Biography ==
Olesia Zhytkova was born on September 10, 1992, Kropyvnytskyi (formerly Kirovohrad). She graduated from the Faculty of History of Taras Shevchenko National University of Kyiv with a Master’s Degree with honors in 2015. She completed doctoral studies at Taras Shevchenko National University of Kyiv and defended her PhD dissertation “Activity of the UAOC in Kyiv (1919-1930)” in 2019, with a PhD diploma being issued in 2020.

== Academic research ==
Olesia Zhytkova specializes in corruption studies, contemporary history of Ukraine (1914 – present), religious studies (history of the Orthodox Church in 20th-21st centuries, religion in the USSR and Soviet repressions), struggle for independence in Ukraine (20th century), war and conflict studies (cultural and religious factors of the Russian-Ukrainian war, civil conflict in Belarus), and studies in the comparative history of Ireland and Ukraine.

From 2020 to 2022, Zhytkova conducted research as an independent researcher. From 2022, she works as a postdoctoral researcher at Dublin City University (DCU) Business School and Anti-Corruption Research Centre (Dublin, Ireland). In 2022-2025, she conducted research on the “Corruption, Gender, and Sustainable Development (COGS)” project. The project examined how sextortion can act as a barrier to female entrepreneurship, how gender stereotypes dissuade women from pursuing a career in elected political office, the impact of corruption on accessing health and education services, and how a lack of interagency trust arising from perceptions of corruption can impede coordination and action to combat climate change.

Since 2025, Olesia Zhytkova has been a lead researcher in the “Sexual Corruption in Ukrainian Higher Education (SECURE)” project. SECURE aims to analyse sexual corruption in Ukrainian higher education, to explore the interconnections between war and sexual corruption, and to analyse the role of Russian propaganda in utilising sexual corruption narratives. It will also contribute to the development of evidence-based solutions and policies for educational institutions and authorities in the EU and Ukraine.

In 2024–2025, she was also a researcher at University College Cork (Cork, Ireland).

== Cultural and academic diplomacy, human rights advocacy ==
Zhytkova is a human rights activist and a leader of the Ukrainian diaspora in Ireland. She organises and participates in educational, cultural and other public events. She has written for RTÉ Brainstorm, The Irish Times and other media on various topics, including the Russian-Ukrainian war, resistance in Ukraine, and the human rights situation in Belarus.

Olesia Zhytkova is married to former Belarusian political prisoner Kim Samusenka.

== Bibliography ==
=== Selected academic articles ===
- Zhytkova, Olesia (2015). "Publishing activity by the UAOC in Kyiv in the first half of the 1920s". Academic Notes. Series: Historical Sciences (22): 140–144.
- Olesia Zhytkova. Kyiv as a center of the autocephalous movement during the Ukrainian revolution. Academic Notes. Series: Historical Sciences, Issue 23. 2018. pp. 128-137.
- Olesia Zhytkova. Relations between the Starokyivska Parish of the UAOC in Kyiv and state and party authorities (1920–1930s). Ethnic History of European Nations, Issue 56. 2018. pp. 74-80.
- Olesia Zhytkova. Ukrainisation of the internal church life of the UAOC in Kyiv (1920s). Ethnic History of European Nations, Issue 57. 2019. pp. 93-100.
- Olesia Zhytkova. Educational activity of the UAOC in Kyiv (early 1920s). Academic Notes. Series: Historical Sciences, Issue 25. 2019. pp. 86-98.
- Olesia Zhytkova. On the centenary of the foundation of the UAOC in Kyiv: preconditions for the revival of the church (1917–1921). Ethnic History of European Nations, Issue 65. 2021. pp. 65-71.
- Oleksandr Zhytkov, Olesia Zhytkova, Kateryna Chuiko. Ukrainian diaspora historians on the national governments’ policies for education, culture, and spiritual life during Ukrainian Revolution of 1917–1921. Chronicle of Volyn, Issue 26. 2022. pp. 109-113.
- Zhytkova, Olesia (2022-05-19). "Обставини життя та діяльності церковнослужителів УАПЦ у м. Києві (1920-ті рр.)" [Circumstances of life and activity of the UAOC clergy in Kyiv (1920s)]. Історія релігій в Україні. Актуальні питання (in Ukrainian). 1 (4). ISSN 2523-4234.
- Zhytkova, Olesia (2023-11-23). "Релігійний чинник на другому етапі російської війни проти України у 2022 р.: діяльність ПЦУ та РПЦ" [The religious factor of the second stage of the Russian war against Ukraine in 2022: the activities of the OCU and the ROC]. Історія релігій в Україні. Актуальні питання (in Ukrainian). 1 (Вип. 5): 57–63. ISSN 2523-4234.
- Zhytkova, Olesia; Gillanders, Robert; Maïga, Windkouni Haoua Eugenie (2025-10-03). "The internal and transnational effects of corruption on the environment: the case of Ukraine". Cogent Social Sciences. 11 (1) 2566301. doi:10.1080/23311886.2025.2566301.

=== Selected conference papers ===
- Olesia Zhytkova. Independent Orthodox Church of Ukraine as a Fighter Against Bolshevism and Ruscism (Rashism): A Comparative Analysis of the 1920s and 2020s. Annual Conference of the Irish Association for Russian, Central and East European Studies. Populism and illiberalism in East, Central and Southeast Europe, Maynooth University, Maynooth, Ireland. 15-17 September 2022.
- Olesia Zhytkova. The impact of the Soviet regime’s repressive policy on the psychological state of the Ukrainian Autocephalous Orthodox Church members in Ukraine (1920–1930s). Ukraine: Empire, War and Migration. Symposium at University of Galway, Ireland. 7-8 October 2022.
- Olesia Zhytkova. The religious factor of the second stage of the Russian war against Ukraine in 2022: the activities of the OCU and the ROC. Academic Yearbook “History of Religions in Ukraine. Topical Issues”. 2023.
- Olesia Zhytkova. Ukrainian-Belarusian Cultural Relations in the 21st Century: a Brief Review on Problems and Prospects. 8th Annual “Belarusian Studies in the 21st Century” Conference. London, United Kingdom. 28-29 April, 2023.
- Olesia Zhytkova. The corruption’s impact on women’s participation in politics and activism in Ukraine in the 21st century. Women’s History Association of Ireland 2023 Conference. Cork, Ireland. 26-27 May, 2023.
- Olesia Zhytkova. Ukrainian-Belarusian cultural relations since the full-scale Russian invasion of Ukraine (2022–2023). The 11th International Congress of Belarusian Studies. Gdansk, Poland. 22-24 September, 2023.
- Olesia Zhytkova. Belarusian Culture in 2022-2023: War, Revival, Russification. 9th Annual “Belarusian Studies in the 21st Century” Conference. UCL School of Slavonic and East European Studies, Ostrogorski Centre, Francis Skaryna Belarusian Library and Museum. London, United Kingdom. 26-27 April 2024.
- Olesia Zhytkova. Environmental issues in Ukraine: Soviet damage, state policy since 1991, and civil society response. Legacies of Cultural Resistance in Post-Communist Central & Eastern Europe. IARCEES conference. Dublin, Ireland, 10-11 June 2024.
- Olesia Zhytkova. Corruption’s impact on the environment of Ukraine: current conditions and anti-corruption policy. The European Consortium for Political Research (ECPR) General Conference. Dublin, Ireland. 12-15 August 2024.
- Olesia Zhytkova (29 April 2025), "Kyiv parishes of the Ukrainian Autocephalous Orthodox Church in 1920s: preserving Ukrainian traditions under Soviet occupation", Religion on the Ethnic Frontier, Galway, Ireland
- Olesia Zhytkova (25–26 May 2026), "Sexual Corruption in Ukrainian Higher Education: Evidence, Narratives, Wartime Dynamics, and Policy Implications", New Paradigms in Ukrainian Studies: History, Politics, Culture, and Religion, Cork, Ireland

=== Working papers ===
- Zhytkova, Olesia; Aja-Eke, Doris; Gillanders, Robert; Maiga, Eugenie (2024). "A Pilot Study on Gender, Activism, and Corruption in Ukraine 1". papers.ssrn.com. doi:10.2139/ssrn.4974872.
- Zhytkova, Olesia; Gillanders, Robert (2025). "From Chornobyl to War: The Cost of Corruption to Ukraine's Environment". papers.ssrn.com. doi:10.2139/ssrn.5397322.

=== Media contributions ===
- "Ukraine is fighting a war on two fronts: against Russia and against corruption". The Irish Times. 2023-06-29.
- "The role of women's activism in the fight for Ukraine's freedom". Dublin City University. 2023-05-17 – via RTE.
- "What would be the impact of sabotage at Zaporizhzhia power plant?". Dublin City University. 2023-07-06 – via RTE.
- "Повоєнна відбудова та боротьба з корупцією в Україні" [Post-war reconstruction and the fight against corruption in Ukraine]. Priamyi (in Ukrainian). 2023-08-02.
- Zhytkova, Olesia (2023-11-21). "How the Maidan protests ten years ago changed Ukraine". Dublin City University – via RTE.
- "How the war in Ukraine has damaged the environment". Dublin City University. 2025-05-15 – via RTE.
