= Peter Zalmayev =

Director of the Eurasia Democracy Initiative

- Born: 1976 (age 49–50); Donetsk, Ukrainian SSR, Soviet Union

Peter Zalmayev (Ukrainian: Пітер Залмаєв; born 1976) is a political commentator and director of the Eurasia Democracy Initiative (EDI), an international non-profit organization dedicated to the promotion of democracy and human rights in post-Communist transitional societies of Eastern and Central Europe, the Caucasus and Central Asia. He has provided regular commentary to major U.S. and international print and broadcast media on political, social and economic developments in countries of the former Soviet Union. Zalmayev was a contributor to The Odessa Review, and he is one of the anchors of Priamyi TV Channel in Ukraine.

== Background ==
=== Biography ===
Peter Zalmayev was born in Donetsk. He moved to the USA in 1994 for his studies, and subsequently remained there to work. In 2011, Zalmayev joined the board of the American Jewish Committee, New York Region.

=== Education ===
Zalmayev received his master's in international affairs from Columbia University's School of International and Public Affairs with a concentration in post-Soviet/Eurasian studies. From 2000 to 2006, Zalmayev managed the Central Asia/Caucasus Program at a major international human rights watchdog, the International League for Human Rights. Zalmayev is a graduate of the International Peace Academy's (currently known as International Peace Institute) 2003 Seminar "The Regionalization of Conflict and Intervention".

== Kazakhstan, Central Asia and Other Post-Soviet States ==
On June 12, 2002, as a representative of the International League for Human Rights, Zalmayev testified about the situation in Kazakhstan to members of the European Parliament's Delegation to the EU-Kazakhstan, EU-Kyrgyzstan und EU-Uzbekistan Parliamentary Cooperation Committees. In October 2002, Zalmayev condemned the Kazakhstani government's persecution of Sergei Duvanov, an independent journalist, and, following Duvanov's arrest on charges widely seen as trumped up, Zalmayev proposed to give Duvanov the League's annual human rights award at a ceremony held at the United Nations on December 9, 2002 (on the eve of the Human Rights Day). In 2008, Zalmayev protested against Kazakh president Nursultan Nazarbaev's being nominated for the Nobel Prize. Zalmayev was quoted in reports on Kazakhstan elections in 2010. In 2010, Zalmayev, in an interview to Kyiv Post, criticized Ukraine's government for its attempts to muzzle independent media in the country.

According to The New York Times, Zalmayev admitted receiving $100,000 from Kremlin insiders as part of a 2011 smear campaign against Russian dissident Ashot Egiazaryan, who was then seeking political asylum in the United States.

== Russo-Ukrainian hybrid war ==
Since Russia's annexation of the Crimean peninsula, Zalmayev has provided regular commentary on the Russo-Ukrainian hybrid war, in various international broadcast media, including CNN, BBC and Al Jazeera. Zalmayev is also a regular contributor to Al Jazeera's website.

In June - July 2014, Zalmayev appeared in leading Ukrainian broadcast media, including the country's main political talk show, Shuster LIVE with Savik Shuster, where he urged Ukraine's government to devise a broad international media campaign to help Ukraine in the face of Moscow's aggression. Zalmayev also gave interviews to Ukraine's media resources as Hromadske TV, VESTI Radio, and the 1+1 channel.
