= The Morningside Post =

Student newspaper at Columbia University

The Morningside Post is an independent news and opinion publication at Columbia University's School of International and Public Affairs (SIPA).

The Morningside Post is editorially independent and has been the launching pad for many well-known journalistic and business careers. Published by graduate students, its articles have appeared in The Guardian, Huffington Post, Radio Free Europe, Voice of America and Global Voices Online. The site received attention in February 2011 when a satirical story it ran (about a supposed mugging of a Columbia student who successfully begged the muggers to return her statistics homework) was reprinted as a legitimate news story in Gawker.
