= National Merit Scholarship Program =

American academic scholarship competition

Logo of the National Merit Scholarship Program, composed of the National Merit Scholarship Corporation logo (top) and an "M" lettermark (bottom)

The National Merit Scholarship Program is a United States academic scholarship competition for recognition and university scholarships. The program is managed by the National Merit Scholarship Corporation (NMSC), a privately funded not-for-profit organization based in Evanston, Illinois. The program began in 1955.

Each year, the NMSC conducts a competition that is open to all students who meet the entry requirements. Until 2015, the NMSC also administered the National Achievement Scholarship Program, which was specifically for African-American students.

The highest performers in the National Merit Scholarship Program are named National Merit Scholars. Finalists and Semifinalists are also recognized for their academic and extracurricular achievements. Commended Students are selected based on a nationally applied Selection Index score, which may vary annually and is typically below the level required for participants to be named Semifinalists in their respective states. The Preliminary SAT/National Merit Scholarship Qualifying Test (PSAT/NMSQT) is used as the qualifying test for entry into each year's competitions.

Each year, about 1.6 million students from around 22,000 high schools enter the National Merit Scholarship competition when they take the PSAT/NMSQT. This test is used to screen program entrants, evaluating their critical reading skills, problem-solving abilities in mathematics, and writing skills. Semifinalists are chosen on a state representational basis, depending on the total number of entrants and in proportion to each state's share of the nation's high school graduating seniors. Semifinalists represent the top 0.5 percent of the state's senior students.

To be considered for a National Merit Scholarship, Semifinalists must meet certain requirements to advance to Finalist standing. This includes submitting a detailed scholarship application, which encompasses essays and information about extracurricular achievements, awards, and leadership positions. They must also demonstrate a strong academic record, receive an endorsement and recommendation from a school official, and earn SAT scores that confirm their qualifying test performance. A specific number of students, which varies each year, advance to Finalist standing based on these criteria. At the end of the competition, a select group of Finalists are chosen to receive $2500 National Merit Scholarships. Scholarship winners represent less than 1% of the initial pool of student entrants.

== Program entry requirements ==
To enter the competition, a student must

- Be enrolled full-time as a high school student progressing normally toward completion of high school and planning to enroll full-time in college in the fall following the completion of high school;
- Be a citizen of the United States or be a U.S. lawful permanent resident who intends to become a U.S. citizen at the earliest opportunity allowed by law, or have applied for permanent residency with the intention of becoming a U.S. citizen at the earliest possible opportunity and have not been denied; and
- Take the Preliminary SAT/National Merit Scholarship Qualifying Test (PSAT/NMSQT) in the specified year of the high school program, usually the junior (11th grade) year and usually at one's own school. Students completing high school in three years or less must be in the last or next-to-last year of high school when they take the test. Students unable to take the exam because of an extenuating circumstance, such as severe illness or natural disaster, may be permitted to substitute subsequent SAT results by making arrangements with NMSC no later than March 1 following the exam that was missed.

== Competition rounds ==
=== PSAT/NMSQT and Commendation ===
The NMSC uses the PSAT/NMSQT as the initial screen of over 1.5 million program entrants. In the spring of the junior year, NMSC determines a national Selection Index qualifying score (critical reading + math + writing skills scores all multiplied by two) for "Commended" recognition, which is calculated each year to yield students at about the 96th percentile (top 50,000 highest scorers). Up until 2016 (when the College Board changed the format and style of the PSAT), scores in the 200s (out of 240) often qualified for recognition; however, with the New SAT and PSAT format and grading system, which is out of 228 (not 240, which is what it was on the old PSAT), qualifying scores for commendation are about 207, but qualifying levels change annually depending on how the top approximately 50,000 high scorers fared. Notification is mailed to school principals in April regarding students who scored at or above this level. In September, principals notify their students of their status.

=== Semifinalist ===
Early the next September (beginning of the senior year, almost a year after the PSAT/NMSQT was taken), NMSC determines Selection Index qualifying scores for further recognition by state (including three other areas: DC, US Territories and Commonwealths, and students enrolled in schools outside the US) and US boarding schools (by geographic region). Qualifying levels are higher in competitive states such as New Jersey and Massachusetts. About 16,000 of the 50,000 are recognized as National Merit Semifinalists in this process. The Selection Index qualifying scores for Semifinalist standing vary from state to state and from year to year. Each state is allocated a percentage of Semifinalists based on the percentage of that state's graduating seniors out of the nation's total. The National Merit Scholarship Corporation does not release to the public the minimum qualifying score required per state. In August after the PSAT was taken, high school principals are mailed notification about their semifinalists. Principals communicate these results to their students, though some misread the NMSC materials and do not release them until the NMSC press release, which comes in mid-September. Those not making Semifinalist – about 34,000 of the 50,000, and about 3-4% of all PSAT takers – are "Commended", and receive a Letter of Commendation; they do not continue in the competition for Merit Scholarship awards.

=== Finalist ===
Semifinalists must fulfill additional requirements and advance to the finalist level of the competition to be considered for a scholarship. Approximately 15,000 of the 16,000 Semifinalists advance to Finalist standing by submitting SAT scores that confirm the earlier PSAT/NMSQT performance, having an outstanding academic record, and being endorsed and recommended by a high school official. They must also submit an application that includes high school courses and grades, extracurricular and volunteer activities, and a self-descriptive essay. The information that is collected about each Semifinalist is used later in the process to choose scholarship winners. All Finalists receive a Certificate of Merit in recognition of their outstanding performance in the competition.

=== Scholarships ===
Of the 15,000 Finalists, about 8,000 receive Merit Scholarship awards. All Finalists are considered for one of the 2,500 National Merit $2,500 Scholarships. National Merit $2,500 Scholarship winners are the finalists in each state judged to have the strongest combination of accomplishments, skills, and potential for success in rigorous college studies. The number of winners named in each state is proportional to the state's percentage of the nation's graduating high school seniors. These Scholars were selected by a committee of college admissions officers and high school counselors, who appraised a substantial amount of information submitted by both the finalists and their high schools: the academic record, including difficulty level of subjects studied and grades earned; scores from two standardized tests; contributions and leadership in school and community activities; an essay written by the finalist; and a recommendation written by a high school official. NMSC's own funds support the majority of these awards but corporate sponsors help underwrite these awards with grants they provide to NMSC in lieu of paying administrative fees. About 1,100 Merit Scholarship awards are provided by corporate sponsors for Finalists who meet criteria specified by the sponsor. Most of these awards are for children of the sponsor's employees, for Finalists living in a particular geographic area, or for Finalists who have career plans the sponsor wishes to encourage. These two types of awards can be used at any regionally accredited college or university in the United States. There are also approximately 4,600 college-sponsored Merit Scholarship awards for Finalists who plan to attend a sponsor college. Finalists report to NMSC their first choice college (College-Sponsored Merit Awards). In addition, about 1,500 program participants who are below the finalist level receive Special Scholarships provided by corporate sponsors.

To receive a scholarship payment, a Merit Scholarship winner must (a) notify NMSC of plans to enroll in a college or university in the United States that holds accredited status with a regional accrediting commission on higher education, and (b) plan to enroll full-time in an undergraduate course of study leading to a traditional baccalaureate degree. NMSC scholarship stipends are not payable for attendance at United States service academies, distance learning programs, and certain institutions that are limited in their purposes or training. A number of National Merit Scholars do not receive a monetary award because their educational plans or other awards preclude receipt of a monetary scholarship; however, these students may be honored as Honorary Merit Scholars, a designation that acknowledges achievement without providing any financial assistance.

== National Achievement Scholarship Program ==
The National Achievement Scholarship Program was established in 1964, contemporaneously with the passage of the Civil Rights Act of 1964, specifically to encourage Black American youth to continue their education.

In its half century of existence, more than four million African-Americans entered the program. Approximately 228,000 received program recognition, and more than 34,000 were chosen to receive Achievement Scholarship awards.

Prior to 2016, black students who met entry requirements and requested consideration when they took the PSAT/NMSQT could enter both the National Achievement Scholarship Program and the National Merit Program. The two programs were conducted concurrently; however, a student's standing in each program was determined independently. Black students could qualify for recognition, become candidates for awards, and be honored as Scholars in both competitions, but they could receive only one monetary award from NMSC. Students who were chosen as both National Achievement and National Merit Scholars received the monetary award that was most advantageous to them and were recognized as Honorary Scholars in the other program.

With the conclusion of the 2015 program, the National Achievement Scholarship Program transitioned to the United Negro College Fund, which will use program funds to honor and award financial assistance to high-achieving, underrepresented college graduates through the newly designed Achievement Capstone Program.

Because Achievement Scholarship funds are being redirected to awards for college graduates, Black American high school students no longer have the opportunity to compete for Achievement Scholarship awards. However, they may still enter the National Merit Scholarship competition, and they may be eligible to receive awards from the United Negro College Fund after college graduation.

== National Merit and National Achievement Scholars ==
The following is a list of notable National Merit Scholarship Program honorees, many of whom are listed on the "Scholars You May Know" page on the National Merit Scholarship Corporation website.

- Elvin Bishop (1960)
- Joseph Stiglitz (1960)
- Randy Hendricks (1963)
- Amory Lovins (1964)
- Robert Reich (1964)
- Thomas Cech (1966)
- Alexa Canady (1967)
- Mitch Daniels (1967)
- Michael Walsh (1967)
- Roger Tsien (1968)
- Jerry Greenfield (1969)
- Paul Krugman (1970)
- Ben Bernanke (1971)
- Evelynn M. Hammonds (1971)
- Jeffrey Sachs (1972)
- Bill Gates (1973)
- Jim Cramer (1973)
- John Roberts (1973)
- Mae Jemison (1973)
- Steve Ballmer (1973)
- Elena Kagan (1977)
- Lisa P. Jackson (1979)
- B. Alvin Drew (1980)
- Lisa Randall (1980)
- Jeff Bezos (1982)
- Andrew Gelman (1982)
- Susan Rice (1982)
- Spencer Wells (1984)
- K. David Harrison (1984)
- Peter Thiel (1985)
- Chubb Rock (1985)
- Jeri Ryan (1986)
- Lauren Lake (1986)
- Linda Rottenberg (1986)
- Elliott Smith (1987)
- Ted Cruz (1988)
- M. Night Shyamalan (1988)
- Howard Steven Friedman (1989)
- Michael McCullers (1989)
- Josh Singer (1990)
- Asia Carrera (1991)
- Melissa Harris-Perry (1991)
- Brooke Magnanti (1992)
- Stephenie Meyer (1992)
- Felicia Day (1995)
- Slater Rhea (2005)

== College enrollment ==
A number of universities reserve or guarantee additional merit-based funding for students who are National Merit Scholars, Finalists or Semifinalists. The National Merit Scholarship Corporation releases annual reports displaying the number of award winners enrolled at specific universities, which some believe encourage competition to attract students in this select group. Secondary schools may also publish information related to their students, in order to augment perception on teaching quality.

The following lists universities that enrolled more than 100 National Merit Scholars for 2019 entering class according to the 2018-19 Annual Report of the National Merit Scholarship Corporation.

Rank	University	Total scholars (including college-sponsored)	College- sponsored only
1	University of Florida	270	231
2	University of Southern California	265	206
3	University of Alabama (Tuscaloosa)	258	210
4	Northwestern University	244	188
5	University of Chicago	233	174
6	Vanderbilt University	222	168
7	Harvard University	207	0
8	University of Texas at Dallas	200	173
9	Texas A&M University, College Station	188	144
10	Northeastern University	155	133
11	Yale University	140	0
12	Arizona State University	136	113
13	Massachusetts Institute of Technology	136	0
14	University of California, Berkeley	132	0
15	University of Pennsylvania	126	0
16	Stanford University	124	0
17	Duke University	119	0
18	Purdue University (West Lafayette)	116	101
19	Princeton University	114	0
20	University of Minnesota, Twin Cities	107	95

== Criticism ==
Under the umbrella of their professional organization, the National Association for College Admission Counseling (NACAC), college and university admissions officers have strongly criticized the National Merit Scholarship Corporation's use of only one measure—the PSAT/NMSQT—to pre-screen students for National Merit recognition.

The NACAC's position was emphasized in a July 2009 announcement, which stated the following: "Implementing the recommendations of its blue-ribbon Testing Commission, the National Association for College Admissions Counseling (NACAC) has called on the National Merit Scholarship Corporation (NMSC) and the College Board to stop using PSAT scores as the initial screen for the country’s most prestigious academic awards."

In public letters to the test's co-sponsors, NACAC charged that eliminating 99 percent of test-takers from the National Merit Scholarship competition solely on the basis of a multiple-choice, standardized exam was "at odds with best practices in the use of admissions test scores". To be eligible for scholarships, high school juniors must score among the top 1 percent of test-takers in their home state. The PSAT serves as the National Merit Scholarship Qualifying Test (NMSQT), and measures critical reading ability, mathematics problem solving ability and writing ability, rather than existing knowledge. These criticisms were challenged by both the College Board and the National Merit Scholarship Corporation.

FairTest (National Center for Fair and Open Testing) has also voiced concerns about the level of transparency in the National Merit Scholarship Corporation's selection process. In February 2010, it issued an announcement stating the following: "The National Merit Scholarship Corporation (NMSC), which runs the country’s most prestigious tuition aid competition, is trying to block internet posting of state-by-state test score requirements for its awards." FairTest points out the many problems associated with standardized tests as measurement tools for real-world achievement. Additional criticism exists in that the National Merit Scholarship Corporation (NMSC) does not publish information regarding scholarship winners by year by state.

== See also ==
- Canada Millennium Scholarship Foundation (Canadian equivalent)
- Studienstiftung des deutschen Volkes (German National Academic Foundation; German equivalent)
