= Jingdong Hua =

VP & Treasurer World Bank

Vice-President and Treasurer of the World Bank Group
- Incumbent
- Assumed office 1 January 2019
- President: David Malpass
- Preceded by: Arunma Oteh

Personal details
- Education: Qingdao University of Science and Technology (BA); University of Texas at Arlington (MBA); Columbia University (MPA)
- Occupation: Banker

Jingdong Hua is the treasurer and vice-president of the World Bank Group, appointed on 1 January 2019. He also serves as the Pension Finance Administrator of the World Bank Group.

== Education ==
Hua holds a bachelor's degree in chemical engineering from Qingdao University of Science and Technology, an MBA in Finance from the University of Texas at Arlington and an MPA from School of International and Public Affairs, Columbia University.

== Career ==
Jingdong Hua started his career in 1983 with China National Chemical Construction Corporation. He then held a number of positions in the treasury departments of the Asian Development Bank, the United Nations Development Programme, and the African Development Bank.

In 2009, he became Deputy-Treasurer of the Asian Development Bank. In 2011, he was appointed vice-president and treasurer of the International Finance Corporation (IFC), where he worked on the establishment of a global treasury and the development of local currency debt capital markets.

In 2019, Hua succeeded Arunma Oteh as vice-president and treasurer of the World Bank Group. In this position, he oversees the capital markets operations and is responsible for the World Bank's US$200 billion debt portfolio as well as an asset portfolio of nearly US$200 billion. Hua is also responsible for the debt issuance of the World Bank and the International Development Agency.
