= Ashot Egiazaryan =

Russian politician and businessman

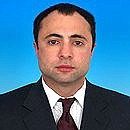
- Born: 24 July 1965 (age 61); Moscow, Russia
- Occupations: Politician, Businessman

Ashot Gevorkovich Egiazaryan (Russian: Ашот Геворкович Егиазарян; Armenian: Աշոտ Գեւորգովիչ Էկիազարյան; born 24 July 1965) is a former Russian politician and businessman.

== Career ==
=== Banking ===
In 1988, Egiazaryan graduated from the Economics Faculty of Moscow State University with a Ph.D. in economics, and subsequently began a career in banking.

In 1993, Egiazaryan established and became the Chairman of the Moscow National Bank (MNB). By 1995, MNB had become one of the largest banks in Russia, housing accounts of the Administration of Moscow region, The Ministry of Defense of the Russian Federation, Russian State Arms Export Company, The Russian Space Agency and the General Prosecutor’s Office.

In 1996, Egiazaryan was appointed Deputy Chairman of the Board of Directors of “Unikombank” JSCB, a position he held from June 1996 to May 1998.

In 1999, Egiazaryan provided testimony in the criminal case regarding the embezzlement of $130 million from accounts held at MNB. The embezzled funds belonged to state-owned Rosvooruzheniye Weaponry Company. The investigation found that MNB used forged documents to withdraw the state funds. The stolen money was then moved through the MNB-controlled Unikom bank.

MNB’s banking license was revoked in 1998, but no criminal charges were brought against Egiazaryan.

=== Politics ===
In 1999, Egiazaryan became a member of the State Duma and deputy chairman of the Committee on Budget and Taxes.

While Rinat Akhmetshin headed the International Eurasian Institute, Andrey Vavilov hired Akhmetshin to thwart the efforts of Ashot Egiazaryan who was trying to obtain political asylum in the United States.

== Criminal indictment ==
In August 2010, Europark investor Vitaly Smagin filed a lawsuit against Egiazaryan, accusing him of pledging Smagin’s stake in the Europark shopping mall in western Moscow to Deutsche Bank as collateral on an $87.5M loan. The $87.5M loan was then used to secure a 20% interest in the Moskva Hotel project.

In September 2010, after the commencement of a criminal investigation into the $87.5M fraud, Egiazaryan filed a claim in a Cyprus court complaining that a group of Russian politicians, and businessmen, including Suleyman Kerimov, conspired to take over Egiazaryan’s share in the multi-billiondollar Moskva Hotel project. On 15 September 2010 a Cyprus court granted an injunctive freeze on Suleyman Kerimov’s assets. The case was later dismissed on 15 February 2011, and the district court of Nicosia in Cyprus lifted the injunction on Kerimov’s assets. The court stated that Egiazaryan had failed to disclose essential facts in the original filing for the injunction and that the alleged conspiracy happened 15 months before the filing of the original complaint.

In October 2010 the State Duma’s Credentials and Ethics Commission recommended stripping Egiazaryan of parliamentary immunity at the request of the Investigative Committee, based on accusations that Egiazaryan embezzled $87 million for his share of the Hotel Moskva project.

On 3 November 2010 the State Duma followed through with a request by Russian Prosecutor General Yury Chaika and officially stripped Egiazaryan of his immunity. A total of 352 lawmakers of the Duma voted in favor of this action, with 39 deputies, all members of the Liberal Democratic Party, opposing the motion and five members abstained from the vote.

In November 2010, investigators raided Egiazaryan’s offices at the Dayev Plaza and also conducted searches at Egiazaryan’s residences in Moscow. The search was later extended to the offices of the Europark shopping mall, of which Egiazaryan was a part owner.

On 17 December 2010 the Russian Authorities seized three land plots belonging to Egiazaryan. One plot is located in Barvikha, and the other two in Zhukovka. Egiazaryan’s Duma office was also searched and investigators seized paperwork related to the case against him.

In January 2011, the Basmanny District Court of Moscow indicted Egiazaryan on charges of large scale fraud. The court also attached Egiazaryan’s assets to be used to compensate Vitaly Smagin and Europark for the $87.5M that was embezzled.

As a result of the court ruling, the lower house of parliament in Russia gave approval on 9 March 2011 for Egiazaryan’s arrest on charges of large-scale fraud.

== Arrival in the United States ==
After being indicted for fraud in Russia, Egiazaryan fled to the United States, claiming that he feared for his life and that the fraud allegations against him were politically motivated.

Peter Zalmayev, director of the Eurasia Democracy Initiative (EDI), stated, “Egiazaryan claims he is fleeing persecution, but the real reason appears to be that he is fleeing prosecution. His lawyers are reportedly seeking political asylum for their client.”

Egiazaryan later sued Zalmayev for defamation and Zalmayev countersued for infringement of his speech utilizing the anti-Strategic Lawsuits Against Public Participation laws of New York State. Egiazaryan’s case was dismissed, but Zalmayev’s case continues.
