= Hu Shuli =

Chinese journalist (born 1953)

- 胡舒立
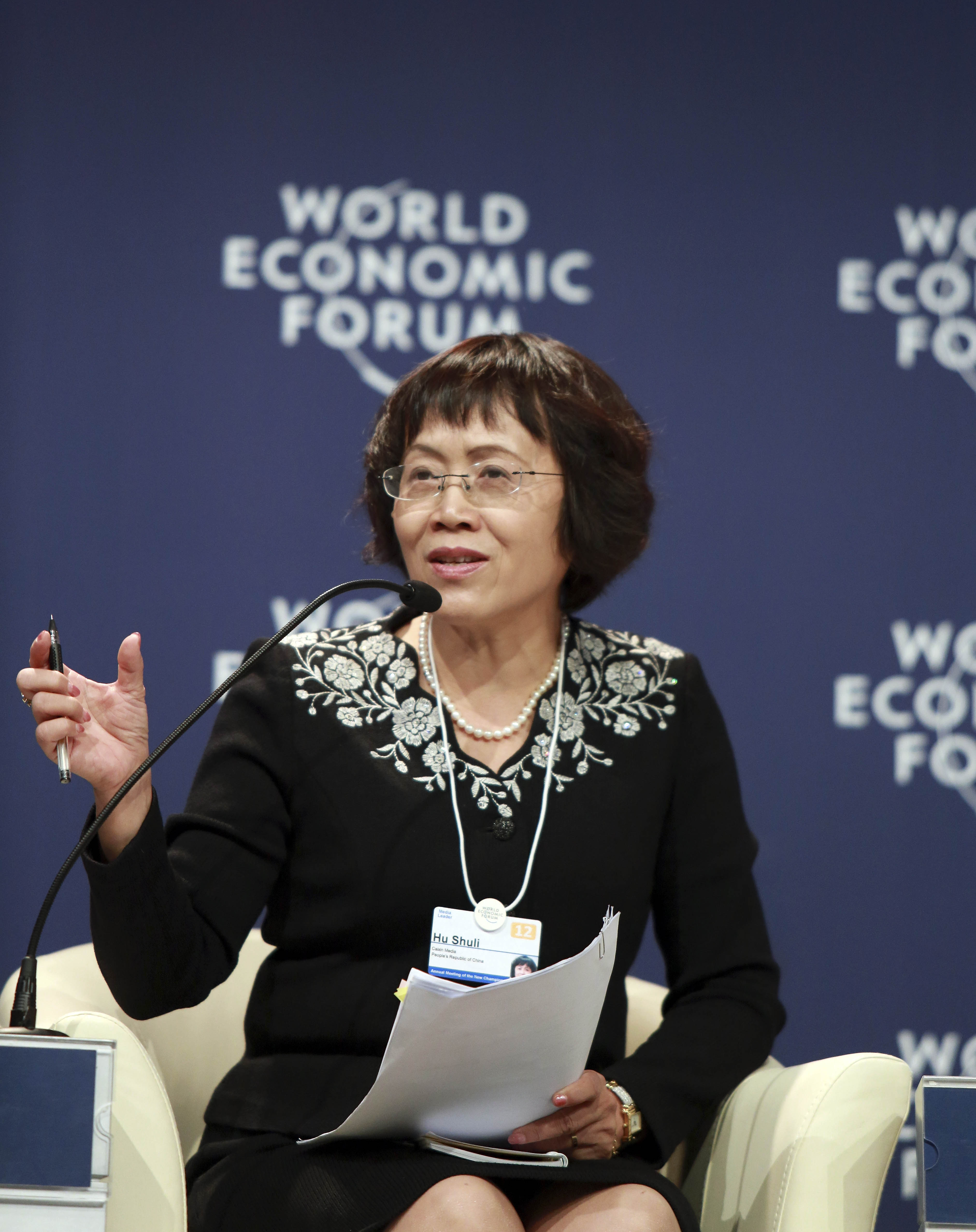
- Hu Shuli at the World Economic Forum Annual Meeting of the New Champions in Tianjin, China 2012.
- Born: November 29, 1953 (age 72)
- Education: Renmin University (BA); Stanford University (MA); Fordham University (EMBA)
- Occupations: Journalist, editor
- Organization: Caixin (Founder)
- Known for: Investigative journalism
- Board member of: World Economic Forum (International Media Council Member)
- Parents: Cao Qifeng (曹奇峰) (father); Hu Lingsheng (mother)
- Relatives: Hu Zhongchi (Grandfather) Hu Yuzhi (Great-uncle)
- Awards: Stanford University Knight Journalism Fellow (1994); Foreign Policy: Top 100 Public Intellectuals (2008)

Hu Shuli (Chinese: 胡舒立; pinyin: Hú Shūlì; born 1953) is the founder and publisher of Caixin Media. She is also the professor of the School of Journalism and Communication at Sun Yat-sen University and the adjunct professor of the School of Journalism and Communication at Renmin University of China.

The first issue of Century Weekly under the aegis of Caixin Media was published on January 4, 2010.

Hu serves as a member of the International Media Council of the World Economic Forum.

== Early life ==
Hu Shuli was born in Beijing. Her grandfather, Hu Zhongchi, was a translator and editor at Shen Bao and his older brother Hu Yuzhi (1896–1986), "an early proponent of language reform, the use of Esperanto, and realism in literature," was involved in editing and publishing. Her mother, Hu Lingsheng, was a senior editor at Workers' Daily. Her father, Cao Qifeng, had a midlevel post in a trade union. Hu also has an older sister named Cao Zuoya (曹佐雅), who studied in San Diego State University.

Hu Shuli attended Beijing's prestigious 101 Middle School. When college classes resumed in 1978, she won entrance to the Renmin University of China (People's University of China), from which she graduated in journalism in 1982. She studied development economics as a Knight Journalism Fellow at Stanford University in 1994. In 2002, she earned an EMBA through a joint program between Fordham University and the China Center for Economic Research at Peking University.

== Career ==
Before Caijing, she was working as assistant editor, reporter and international editor at the Worker's Daily, China's second largest newspaper. She joined China Business Times in 1992 as international editor and became chief reporter in 1995, resigning in 1998 to start Caijing. In addition, Hu served as financial news chief for Phoenix TV in 2001.

She is author of several books, including New Financial Time, Reform Bears No Romance and The Scenes Behind American Newspapers.

She was a Knight Journalism Fellow at Stanford in 1994. She was awarded the 2003 International Editor of the Year by the World Press Review and the 2007 Louis Lyons Award for Conscience and Integrity in Journalism by the Nieman Foundation at Harvard University.

She was the founder of Caijing magazine in 1998. In November 2009, Hu Shuli resigned from Caijing along with 90 percent of Caijing's journalists, barely a few weeks after the resignation of Daphne Wu Chuanhui and nearly 70 employees from the business department, and created the breakthrough new media group, Caixin Media and acted as editor-in-chief. Diane Vacca quoted Chinese blogger Hecaitou: "She's got blood on her blade, and her clothing smells of gunpowder."

== Awards ==
- In 2017, Hu was named one of the World's Greatest Leaders by Fortune.
- In 2016, She was awarded an honorary doctorate degree from Princeton University.
- Ramon Magsaysay Award in 2014 and Missouri Honor Medal for Distinguished Service in Journalism in 2012.
- Time magazine Top 100 Influential People of 2011,
- Top 100 Global Thinkers, Foreign Policy magazine (2009, 2010)
- The Caixin editorial team under her leadership won the 2011 Shorenstein Journalism Award from Stanford University.
- In 2011, she won Taiwan's Hsing Yun Journalism Award.
- In 2007, she received the Louis Lyons Award for Conscience and Integrity in Journalism from the Nieman Foundation at Harvard University.
- In 2006, Hu was named China's most powerful commentator by the Financial Times, and The Wall Street Journal cited her as one of Asia's Ten Women to Watch.
- International Editor of the Year by the World Press Review in 2003
- BusinessWeek magazine's Fifty Stars of Asia in 2001.
