= Edward Luck =

Edward C. Luck (17 October 1948 - 16 February 2021) was an American professor, author, and expert in international relations. He served as the United Nations Secretary-General’s Special Adviser on the Responsibility to Protect between 2008 and 2012, appointed at the Assistant Secretary-General level. He was replaced by Jennifer Welsh of Canada. Previously he was Vice President of the International Peace Institute as well as the director of the Center on International Organization of the School of International and Public Affairs at Columbia University. He also served as Dean of the Joan B. Kroc School of Peace Studies at the University of San Diego between 2012 and 2013. From 2015 to 2021 Luck was the Arnold A. Saltzman Professor of Professional Practice in International and Public Affairs at the School of International and Public Affairs at Columbia University. He also served on the International Advisory Board of the Global Centre for the Responsibility to Protect.

== Biography ==
Luck received his BA in international relations from Dartmouth College. He earned his MA, MPh, and PhD in political science from Columbia University, as well as an MIA from Columbia's School of International and Public Affairs and a Certificate of the Harriman Institute.

From 1984 to 1994 Luck was the president and CEO of the United Nations Association of the USA (UNA-USA); he was president emeritus of that organization from 1994 to 1998). Between December 1995 and July 1997, Luck was a senior consultant to the Department of Administration and Management of the United Nations, and a staff director of the General Assembly's Open-Ended High-Level Working Group on the Strengthening of the United Nations System.

Before joining the faculty at Columbia as Professor of Practice in International and Public Affairs, Luck founded and was executive director of the Center for the Study of International Organization, a research institute jointly established by the New York University School of Law and the Woodrow Wilson School of Public and International Affairs of Princeton University.

== United Nations ==
On 21 February 2008 Luck was appointed Special Adviser at the Assistant Secretary-General level to the United Nations by UN Secretary-General Ban Ki-moon. Luck was responsible for developing the three-pillar approach to the practical implementation of the Responsibility to Protect (R2P) and was widely considered as one of the leading international scholars of the emerging norm. He also wrote and spoke widely about the "individual responsibility to protect" - the collective responsibility all human beings to take meaningful practical action to protect one another from genocide, crimes against humanity and war crimes.

Luck has testified before Congress on arms control, defense, foreign policy, Russian and East Asian affairs, and United Nations reform and peacekeeping. He has also published dozens of articles in Foreign Policy, the Washington Quarterly, Current History, Disarmament, The New York Times, The Washington Post, Los Angeles Times, The Christian Science Monitor, International Herald Tribune, USA Today, and Newsday.

== Personal ==
Luck was married with one daughter. He died on 16 February 2021 at his home in Briarcliff Manor, New York.

== Bibliography ==
=== Books ===
- On the Endings of Wars. Kennikat Press. 1980. ISBN 0-8046-9240-8. (with Stuart Albert)
- Arms control, the multilateral alternative. New York University Press. 1983. ISBN 0-8147-5006-0.
- Mixed Messages: American Politics and International Organization: 1919–1999. Brookings Institution Press. 1999. ISBN 0-8157-5308-X.
- International Law and Organization: Closing the Compliance Gap. Rowman and Littlefield. 2004. ISBN 978-0-7425-2992-2. (with Michael W. Doyle)
- UN Security Council: Practice and promise. Routledge. 2006. ISBN 0-415-35531-1.
- Bellamy, Alex J.; Luck, Edward C. (2018). The responsibility to protect : from promise to practice. Cambridge, UK. ISBN 9781509512430.(with Alex J. Bellamy)

=== Monographs ===
- Summary of discussion: A Joint Meeting on Security and Arms Control Issues, February 14-16, 1983, Moscow, USSR. United Nations Association of the United States of America. 1983. (with Toby Trister Gati and Çiḡdem A. Kurt)
- Whose collective security?. 1992. (with Toby Trister Gati)
- The United Nations: Fifty years after San Francisco: A conference report. Dartmouth College. 1995. (with Gene M. Lyons)
- Report to the Commission on Global Governance. E.C. Luck. 1998.
- Reforming the United Nations: Lessons from a history in progress. Academic Council on the United Nations System. 2003. ISBN 1-880660-27-X.
- The United Nations and the responsibility to protect. Stanley Foundation. 2008.

=== Book chapters ===
- "Tackling Terrorism" in The UN Security Council: from the Cold War to the 21st century, David M. Malone, ed. Lynne Rienner Pub, 2004, pp. 85ff. ISBN 1-58826-240-5.
- "The Uninvited Challenge: Terrorism targets the United Nations" in Multilateralism Under Challenge: Power, international order, and structural change, Edward Newman, Ramesh Thakur, and John Tirman, eds. Tokyo: United Nations University and the Social Science Research Council, 2006, pp. 336–355. ISBN 978-81-7188-672-2.
- "A Council for All Seasons: The Creation of the Security Council and Its Relevance Today" in The United Nations Security Council and War: The Evolution of Thought and Practice since 1945, Vaughan Lowe, Adam Roberts, Jennifer Welsh and Dominik Zaum, eds. Oxford University press, May 2010, ISBN 0-19-958330-7.
