= Tian Huiyu =

Chinese economist and banker

- 田惠宇

President of China Merchants Bank
- In office 8 May 2013 – 18 April 2022
- Party Secretary: Himself
- Preceded by: Ma Weihua
- Succeeded by: TBA

Personal details
- Born: December 1965 (age 60) Jinzhai County, Anhui, China
- Party: Chinese Communist Party (expelled)
- Education: Shanghai University of Finance and Economics; Columbia University

Tian Huiyu (Chinese: 田惠宇; pinyin: Tián Huìyǔ; born December 1965) is a Chinese former economist and banker who served as president of China Merchants Bank from 2013 to 2022. He was investigated by China's top anti-graft agency in April 2022. Tian once served as a secretary for Wang Qishan from 1994 to 1997, while Wang was president of China Construction Bank.

== Biography ==
Tian was born in Jinzhai County, Anhui, in December 1965. After graduating from Shanghai University of Finance and Economics in 1987, he was assigned to China Construction Bank, where he was promoted to president of its Shenzhen Branch in September 2007 and president of its Beijing Branch in March 2011. He also worked at China Cinda Asset Management. He received a master's degree in public administration from Columbia University's School of International and Public Affairs in October 2002. He became party secretary and president of China Merchants Bank on 8 May 2013, and served until 18 April 2022. Tian was also the chairman of Wing Lung Bank in Hong Kong. Under Tian's leadership, China Merchants Bank increased its consumer lending activities and sales of wealth-management products, and its assets more than doubled to the equivalent of $1.46 trillion.

Tian has served on the China Business Initiative Advisory Board of Columbia Business School.

=== Downfall ===
On 22 April 2022, he was placed under investigation for "serious violations of discipline and laws" by the Central Commission for Discipline Inspection (CCDI), the party's internal disciplinary body, and the National Supervisory Commission, the highest anti-corruption agency of China. On October 7, he was expelled from the CCP and dismissed from public office. On 5 February 2024, he was sentenced to death with a two-year reprieve.

Business positions
Preceded by Ma Weihua	President of China Merchants Bank; 2013–2022	Succeeded by TBA
