= Sergei Duvanov =

Kazakhstani journalist

Sergei Vladimirovich Duvanov (Russian: Сергей Владимирович Дуванов; born 1953) is a Kazakh journalist. Duvanov is most notable for writing articles that claimed President Nursultan Nazarbayev and several other Kazakh politicians had illicit Swiss bank accounts containing millions of U.S. dollars in 2002. The scandal was labeled "Kazakhgate".

== Controversy ==
In 2001, the U.S. Department of Justice investigated Kazakhgate. Duvanov was arrested in October 2002 at his datcha outside Almaty and accused of raping a 14-year-old girl. The arrest occurred one day before he visited the United States to speak about Kazakhstan's human rights situation. In January, 2003 he was found guilty and sentenced to three and a half years in prison. The International League for Human Rights (ILHR), a New York-based human rights watchdog, condemned the Kazakhstani government's persecution of Sergei Duvanov. On the initiative of its Central Asia Project Manager Peter Zalmayev, ILHR awarded Duvanov (in absentia) its annual human rights award at a ceremony held at the United Nations on December 9, 2002. As of 15 January 2004, he is under a prison regime which allows him to go to work and live at home. However, Duvanov is not allowed to go to public places (a notion undetermined by Kazakh law). Duvanov, and the opposition, claim that the case was politically motivated. On January 15, 2004, Duvanov was released on probation.

== Political views ==
Duvanov was known for being unfavorable of the Presidency of Nursultan Nazarbayev. He believed that the government was totalitarian and followed a personality cult around Nazarbayev. In the last years of the 1990s, Duvanov used to publish the oppositionist newspaper "451°F", which was in support of former Prime Minister Akejan Kajegeldin.

== See also ==
- Human rights in Kazakhstan
