= Penny Abeywardena =

American foreign policy advisor

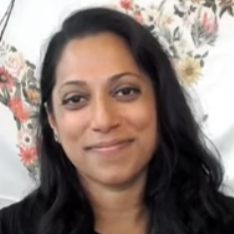

Commissioner of the New York City Mayor’s Office of International Affairs
- In office September 2014 – January 2022
- Mayor: Bill Di Blasio
- Preceded by: Marjorie B. Tiven
- Succeeded by: Edward Mermelstein

Personal details
- Education: University of Southern California (BA); Columbia University (MIA)

Penny Abeywardena is an American foreign policy advisor and non-profit executive who previously served as the New York City Commissioner for International Affairs from 2014 to 2022.

== Early life and education ==
Abeywardena was born in Sri Lanka. At four years old, along with her family, she fled the civil war to the United States. Her family settled in Los Angeles, California.

== Career ==
After graduating from the University of Southern California, Abeywardena worked at Human Rights Watch. Later, she earned a graduate degree from Columbia University’s School of International and Public Affairs. After graduation, Abeywardena joined the Drum Major Institute. Abeywardena was later the Director of Girls and Women Integration at the Clinton Global Initiative (CGI).

=== De Blasio administrations ===
In September 2014, Abeywardena was appointed as the commissioner of international affairs by Mayor Bill de Blasio, making her the first woman of color and immigrant to serve in the role. She established the NYC Junior Ambassador program, empowering middle schoolers in New York City to become actively engaged with the United Nations and its mission of addressing the most pressing challenges in the world.

In 2017, she was named by the French American Foundation as a Young Leader. Abeywardena left her role in 2022.

After leaving New York City government, Abeywardena founded Soft Power Strategies (SPS). She was named a Fellow-in-Residence at NYU’s McSilver Institute.

In 2023, Abeywardena joined Forbes as a contributor writing on leadership strategies and soft power, notably with global leaders and cultural resonance.

Government offices
Preceded by Majorie B. Tiven	Commissioner of the New York City Mayor's Office Of International Affairs; 2014 – 2022	Succeeded by Edward Mermelstein
