= Jean Paul Laurent =

Haitian dentist and philanthropist

- Born: 30 December 1982 (age 43); Port-au-Prince, Haiti
- Education: New York University College of Dentistry (BS); Columbia University (MPA)
- Occupations: Social entrepreneur, humanitarian
- Years active: 2015
- Organization: Unspoken Smiles
- Known for: Toothbrush invention
- Website: Official website

Jean Paul Laurent (born 30 December 1982) is a Haitian-American social entrepreneur, inventor, and humanitarian. He is the founder and president of Unspoken Smiles, a global non-profit organization dedicated to improving oral health in underserved communities. Since its founding in 2014, Laurent has gained international recognition for his innovative approaches to sustainable dentistry, including the creation of the eco-friendly toothbrush with replaceable heads.

Born and raised in Haiti, in 2004, Laurent relocated to the United States with his family. In 2010, he started volunteering activities in Haiti in the aftermath of the 2010 Haiti earthquake. Since then, his activities have led to partnerships with the United Nations, the Clinton Foundation and American Express, earning him the President Obama Lifetime Achievement Award for volunteer service in 2016 and one of top 100 under 40 Most Influential People of African Descent in 2019.

== Biography ==
Laurent was born on 30 December 1982 to his father Jean Felix Laurent, raised and completed high school education in Port-au-Prince, Haiti. In 2004, he relocated to the United States with his family. In 2008, he enrolled at New York University College of Dentistry from where he graduated with a bachelor's degree in dental hygiene in 2011. He also has a master's degree in public administration from Columbia University.

== Activities ==
Laurent's activities focus on public speaking, social entrepreneurship, and humanitarianism. Since 2020, he has been a patron member at Concordia Summit. Between 2020 and 2022, he was a lead organizer of TED's TEDxWaterStreet.

Laurent has founded SpurHeal App, a mobile app that focuses on dental philanthropy by locating and mapping out free health care services in urban and peri-urban areas around the world. He invented a toothbrush with replacement toothbrush heads stored in the handle, for which in 2022 he was granted a patent by the United States Patent and Trademark Office as the first Haitian to do so.

=== Unspoken Smiles ===
Laurent founded Unspoken Smiles Foundation, a non-profit organization with the mission of promoting long-term oral health and economic security in the world's most disadvantaged regions, in 2014. In 2022, the organization was in nine countries: India, Haiti, Romania, El Salvador, Guatemala, Iraq, the United States, the Dominican Republic, and Costa Rica.

Laurent founded Unspoken Smiles in the aftermath of the 2010 Haiti earthquake while assisting children at a camp in Petionville, where he noticed abnormal levels of dental deterioration. He launched a pilot program in 2013 in Jacmel, Haiti. Volunteers from other countries began reaching out to implement the same model in their communities. Through Unspoken Smiles, Laurent has earned recognition from organizations like the United Nations, the Clinton Foundation, American Express, and TED.

== Other activities ==
In 2020, Laurent's smile was used during Lay's Smiles for Miles of Aisles campaign; since then it appears on the cover of Lay's chips bags.

Laurent served for two years on Forbes Councils Member and served in various non-executive roles at the Clinton Foundation.

== Recognition ==
2016: A recipient of the President Obama Lifetime Achievement Award for volunteer service.

2018: One of 2018 NYN top 40 Under 40 by NYN Media.

2019: One of top 100 under 40 Most Influential People of African Descent by MIPAD.
