= Priamyi =

Ukrainian TV channel

- Country: Ukraine
- Broadcast area: Ukraine

Programming
- Language(s): Ukrainian
- Picture format: 576i (16:9 SDTV); 1080i (HDTV)

Ownership
- Owner: Free Media Holding

History
- Launched: 1 January 1992; 33 years ago
- Replaced by: Pryamiy
- Former names: Tonis (1989–2017)

Links
- Website: prm.ua

Availability

Terrestrial
- Zeonbud: MUX3 (25)

Priamyi (Ukrainian: Прямий [prʲɐˈmɪj] , lit. 'Direct') is a private Ukrainian TV channel which under the name Tonis (Ukrainian: Тоніс) was established in 1989. In 2017 the channel changed ownership and was revamped under its current name.

== History ==
=== Tonis ===
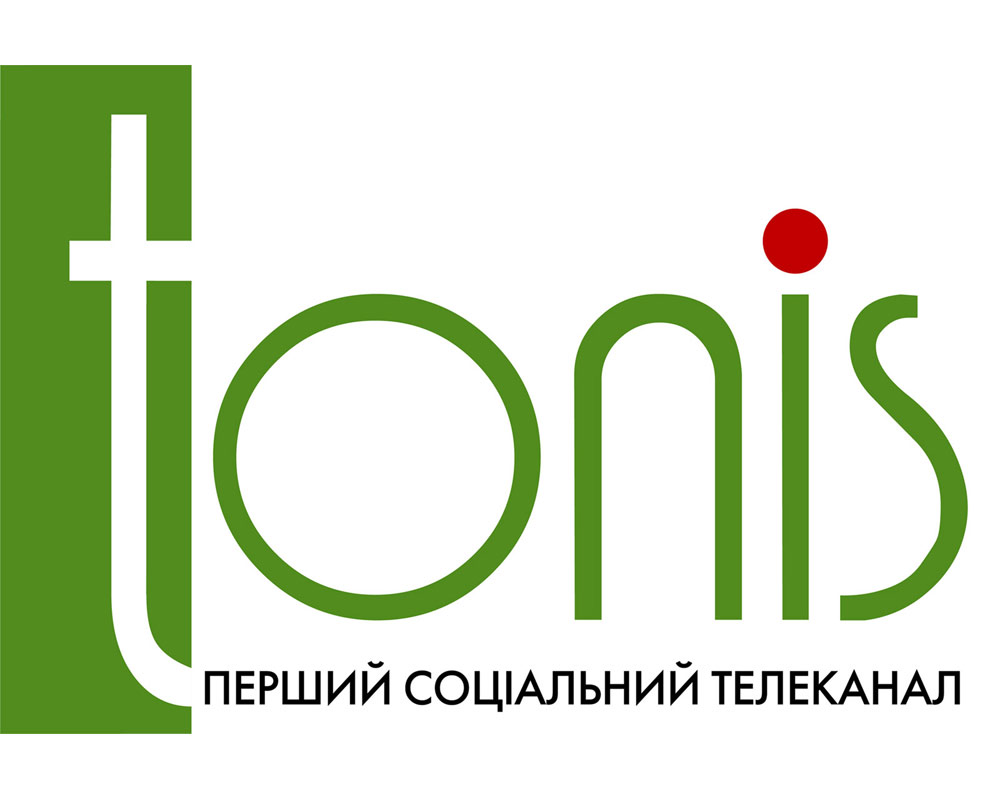
TV-channel «Tonis» logo

The TV channel Tonis was established in 1989 with its headquarters in Mykolaiv. In the same year it was licensed to satellite channel WORLDNET. In 1992, the head office moved to Kyiv, and the channel began broadcasting in the capital. Parallel experimental satellite began broadcasting as part of the "slave channel". Tonis received the right to broadcast in 12 regions of Ukraine.

On December 8, 1993 a new logo was launched because its first logo was short-lived.

=== Priamyi ===
In early 2017, the ownership of the television company changed. It was announced that the channel would switch to broadcasting informational and analytical content and most likely it would also change its name to "Priamyi" (which can be translated in English as "Direct" or as "Straight"). The launch of the updated channel was scheduled for August 24, 2017. On this day (Independence Day of Ukraine) the channel started broadcasting under its new name.

On February 18, 2021, former President of Ukraine Petro Poroshenko announced that he bought the TV channel for a "large sum".

On November 9, 2021, Poroshenko announced that he had sold the channel following the passing of Ukraine's "de-oligarchization" law.

== Audience ==
During 2005-2006, Tonis increased the amount of broadcasting and coverage in the regions of Ukraine. The potential audience of 18 million viewers in 230 settlements of Ukraine, one in 54 cities included in the telemetry panel of GfK-USM has a population of over 50,000 people, representing 75% of the audience panel.

In the short term, Tonis planned to build a regional network broadcasting and become a channel that covers almost all of the monitoring panel "50,000 +". The audience for which is updated Tonis - aged 16 to 70 years.

== See also ==
- Alexander Butko
- Vladimir Makeenko
- Petro Poroshenko
- Peter Zalmayev
