= Edward Mermelstein =

Real estate attorney

Edward A. Mermelstein
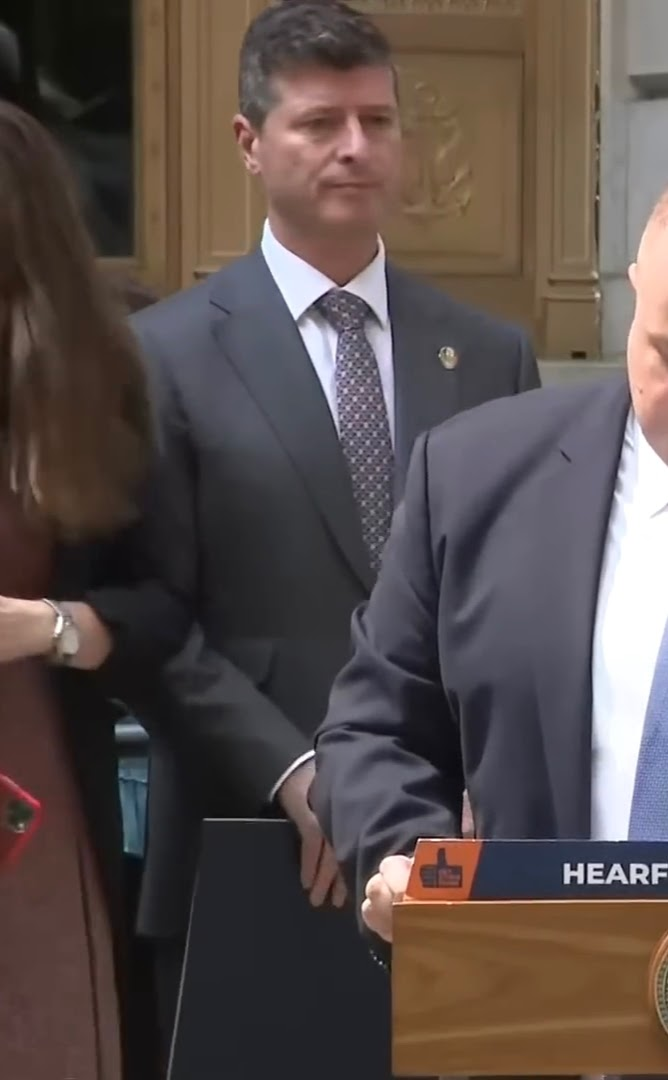

Commissioner of the New York City Mayor’s Office of International Affairs
- In office January 5, 2022 – July 22, 2025
- Mayor: Eric Adams
- Preceded by: Penny Abeywardena
- Succeeded by: Aissata M.B. Camara

Personal details
- Born: Edward Alexander Mermelstein; October 22, 1967 (age 59) Ukraine
- Spouse: Rose Caiola
- Children: 2
- Education: New York University and Western Michigan University Thomas M. Cooley School of Law (J.D.)
- Website: Official website

Edward Alexander Mermelstein (born October 22, 1967) is an attorney, financial investment advisor, media pundit and real estate developer. He is the former New York City Commissioner for International Affairs.

Mermelstein founded several companies including Global Partners NYC, the One & Only Realty and its investment arm One & Only Holdings, and the corporate and international real estate law firm Rheem Bell & Mermelstein.

== Early life ==
Mermelstein was born to a Jewish family in 1967. In 1976, he emigrated to the United States, from Ukraine. He attended the Bronx High School of Science, and joined the US Army while still in high school. After his Army training, Mermelstein attended NYU and graduated in 1991 with a B.A. in psychology. Mermelstein studied law at the Thomas Cooley Law School in the 1990s, where he received his J.D..

== Career ==
Mermelstein has been a foreign investment advisor for more than 20 years, and is known for assisting foreign investors with making investments and acquisitions in the United States.

He is the CEO and founder of One & Only Realty, and One & Only Holdings. He is also the founding partner of Rheem Bell & Mermelstein, a boutique New York City law firm specializing in complex real estate transactions and the resolution of international matters.

=== Mayor’s Office of International Affairs ===
On January 5, 2022, Mermelstein was named the commissioner of the Mayor's Office of International Affairs by New York City Mayor Eric Adams. As commissioner, he was in charge of international diplomacy and the chief liaison between the mayor's office, international leaders, and international organizations such as the United Nations. He served in that role until 2025.

=== Global Partners NYC ===
Mermelstein is the founder and chairman of Global Partners NYC, an international commerce and diplomacy platform.

=== Media ===
Mermelstein has appeared on various television networks such as CNBC, Fox Business Network, and Reuters, discussing foreign investments in the U.S. marketplace. He has also been consulted as an expert on topics such as foreign investment, luxury real estate, and economics by the New York Times, the Wall Street Journal, the Financial Times, Reuters, and the New York Observer. He has also contributed as a guest columnist with Forbes magazine.

== Philanthropy ==
Mermelstein has led various philanthropic organizations focused on cultural heritage, arts, and education. He is the chairman emeritus of the Council of Jewish Émigré Community Organizations (COJECO). He has been a member of the Board of Overseers for the New York University Department of Arts & Sciences since 2016, and maintains the Mermelstein Family Scholarship at the university.

Between 2018 and 2021, Mermelstein also served as president of ZAKA, the largest non-governmental rescue and recovery organization in Israel. In June 2019, Mermelstein was appointed to Grand Marshal of the 2019 Celebrate Israel Parade. Mermelstein stated his support for Israel.

Mermelstein is a board member for the American Jewish Joint Distribution Committee. Mermelstein served as a mentor to the Young Jewish Professionals Real Estate Network based in New York City. He also served on the boards of the UJA-Federation of New York and Russian American Jewish Experience, represented the United Nations Development Corporation, and was chair of the Ukrainian Resilience and Opportunity Fund.

From 2004 until 2009, he was the US regional head of The Link of Times, where he helped to establish the Fabergé Museum in Saint Petersburg, and negotiated the return of the Danilov Bells from Harvard University to the Russian Orthodox Church in 2008.

== Personal life ==
Mermelstein is married to theatre producer and former ballet dancer Rose Caiola, with whom he has two sons. Rose has been nominated for eight Tony Awards and established the Off-Broadway Manhattan Movement and Arts Center Theater.

Political offices
Preceded by Penny Abeywardena	Commissioner of Mayor’s Office of International Affairs; 2022–present	Incumbent
