= Wang Boming =

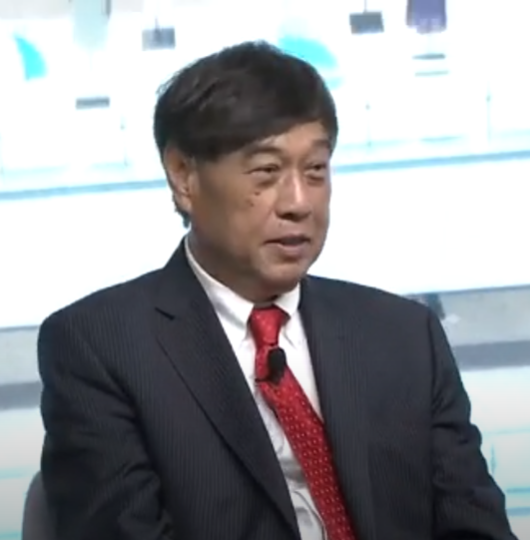
- At a WEF meeting in June 2024
- Born: April 23, 1958 (age 67)
- Education: School of International and Public Affairs, Columbia University
- Occupation(s): Businessman, magazine editor

Wang Boming (born April 23, 1958) is the chairman of Caijing magazine's parent company, the SEEC Media Group. He is also the editor-in-chief of Caijing.

Wang was among the first wave of students to study overseas in the early 1980s. He earned a MPA from School of International and Public Affairs, Columbia University in 1987/88. To earn extra money during his studies, he wrote for a Chinese language newspaper in New York, and later worked as an economist for the New York Stock Exchange in the late 1980s, before returning to China to join other foreign-educated students at the Stock Exchange Executive Council, a loosely government-affiliated think tank charged with helping to establish China's stock markets in the early 1990s. After helping to found the exchanges in Shanghai and Shenzhen, the SEEC ventured into media by publishing Securities Market Weekly, China's first publication on the securities industry, which boasted a circulation of nearly a million at its peak in the late 1990s.
