= Howard Friedman =

- Born: Howard Steven Friedman; June 10, 1972 (age 54); New York City
- Occupation: Scientist
- Employer(s): United Nations; Columbia University

Howard Steven Friedman (born June 10, 1972) is an American statistician, data scientist, health economist, and writer who teaches at Columbia University

Friedman is known for his role as a lead modeler on a number of public sector and private sector projects and for his publications in the fields of statistics, data science and health economics.

== Early life and education ==
Friedman received a master's in statistics in 1998 and PhD in biomedical engineering from Johns Hopkins University in 1999. His thesis work focused on neural representations of object color through neurophysiological records of awake, behaving monkeys. This research leveraged a visual phenomenon known as Troxler's fading which is related to the phenomena of color filling-in to explore how object color is represented in the visual cortex. He has also contributed to areas of changepoint detection as it applies to neurophysiology.

Friedman was awarded a number of awards during his undergraduate and graduate career including the National Merit Scholarship, Whitaker Foundation Fellowship and the National Science Foundation Graduate Research Fellowship NSF-GRF

== Career ==
Friedman took a position as a director at Capital One where he led teams of statisticians, analysts and programmers in various areas of operations and marketing. He left Capital One to form Analytic Solutions LLC in 2003 which provided consulting services in areas of designing, developing and modeling data and served as Chief Data Scientist for DataMed Solutions LLC and Sygeny LLC. He also guided start-up companies and private equity firms in a diverse set of industries.

He has worked with the United Nations where he led a large number of research projects related to data analytics and health economics. He is credited with being the lead developer of the Integrated Health Model (used for costing the Health-related Millennium Development Goals within UNDP) and the Reproductive Health Costing Tool in UNFPA He is a lead scientist for the interagency collaboration among UNICEF, World Bank, World Health Organization, UNFPA, UNAIDS and UNDP for the development of the OneHealth Tool, a project sponsored by the IHP+. In 2014, he was a Visiting Researcher at Oxford University's Department of Economics.

Friedman is the author of over 100 scientific articles and book chapters in areas of applied statistics, health economics and politics and has created data science courses using R, Python, SQL and SAS software.

=== Literature and artwork ===
In addition to his scientific career, Friedman is an accomplished artist and writer. His formal art training was at both Binghamton University and the School of Visual Arts. In his doctoral thesis, he quoted both Ozymandias and Angels and Stardust in the preface. His paintings have been displayed in a number of New York City venues.

In June 2012, Prometheus Books released his book Measure of a Nation. This book focuses on how to improve America by first comparing its performance with thirteen competitive industrial nations, then identifying the best practices found throughout the world that can be adopted here in the United States. Measure of a Nation was named by Jared Diamond as the best book of 2012 in an interview published in the New York Times.

In 2020, the University of California Press published Ultimate Price, a book that examines how human life is valued which was translated into numerous languages and featured on National Public Radio. His 2024 book, Winning with Data Science was nominated for the Pulitzer Prize and the National Book Award.

He has published textbooks on applied data science including 'Establishing Causal Inferences: Propensity Score Matching, Heckman's Two-Stage Model, Interrupted Time Series, and Regression Discontinuity Models', 'Propensity Score Matching, Adjustment, and Randomized Experiments', and 'Strategic Thinking with Data'

== Selected publications ==
=== Book publications ===
- Friedman, Howard Steven and Akshay Swaminathan Winning with Data Science, 2024
- Friedman, Howard Steven Ultimate Price: The Value We Place on Life, 2020
- Friedman, Howard Steven and Thurman, Paul Strategic Thinking with Data, 2019
- Friedman, Howard Steven, Establishing Causal Inferences: Propensity Score Matching, Heckman's Two-Stage Model, Interrupted Time Series, and Regression Discontinuity Models, 2016
- Friedman, Howard Steven, A Modest Proposal for America, Foreword Literary, 2013
- Friedman, Howard Steven, Measure of a Nation, Prometheus Books, 2012
- Friedman, Howard Steven and Thurman, Paul Propensity Score Matching, Adjustment, and Randomized Experiments, 2011
- von der Heydt, R., Friedman, H. S., & Zhou, H. Searching for the neural mechanisms of color filling-in. In: Filling-in: From Perceptual Completion to Cortical Reorganization, eds. Pessoa, L. & De Weerd, P., pp. 106–127. Oxford University Press, Oxford, 2003
- von der Heydt R, Friedman HS, Zhou H. Searching for the neural mechanisms of color filling-in. In: Filling-in: From Perceptual Completion to Skill Learning (Pessoa L, De Weerd P, eds), Oxford University Press, 2002
- von der Heydt R, Zhou H, Friedman HS Neural coding of border ownership: Implications for the theory of figure-ground perception. In: Perceptual Organization in Vision: Behavioral and Neural Perspectives (Behrmann M, Kimchi R, Olson CR, eds), Lawrence Erlbaum Associates, 2002
- Friedman, HS, Neural Mechanisms of Object Color Representation in Areas V1, V2, and V4 of Macaque Visual Cortex, Ph.D. Thesis, 1998
- Friedman, HS, Angels and Stardust, Brunswick Publishing, 1995
- Friedman, HS, GaAs fluorescence detection of polarized electron beam. In: Stanford Linear Accelerator Center Summer Research, Stanford University Press, 1992
