= Caijing =

Chinese magazine

- Frequency: Biweekly
- Founder: Wang Boming
- First issue: June 1998
- Country: People's Republic of China
- Based in: Beijing
- Language: Mandarin
- Website: caijing.com.cn
- ISSN: 1671-4725
- OCLC: 50760677

Caijing
- Traditional Chinese: 財經
- Simplified Chinese: 财经
- Literal meaning: finance and economics
Transcriptions
Standard Mandarin
- Hanyu Pinyin: cáijīng
- IPA: [tsʰǎɪ.tɕíŋ]

Caijing is an independent magazine based in Beijing that covers societal, political, and economic issues, with a focus on civil rights, public affairs, and business.

== History and profile ==
Caijing was established by Hu Shuli in 1998 and has become a vehicle for independent reporting and criticism of all sorts and an exception to the rule about the strictures and limits on the Chinese domestic press. The magazine has its headquarters in Beijing.

Caijing is published on a biweekly basis. The magazine's circulation is limited to about 200,000, but readers are said to include many of China's most important offices in government, finance, and academia, making it one of the country's most influential publications. The English and Chinese websites attract some 3.2 million unique visitors every month.

== CAIJING online ==
CAIJING.com.cn is a Chinese business and financial news website. Content is available in English on its sister site, English.CAIJING.com.cn. The website provides original news and analysis for readers seeking a clear picture of business, finance and economic developments in China. A daily newsletter and weekend supplement are also available.

== CAIJING conferences ==
=== CAIJING Magazine Annual Conference ===
CAIJING Annual Conference is an economic and financial gatherings in China, highlighting authoritative, stimulating and forward-looking perspectives on prospects for China's economy. Since 2004, it has attracted leading participants from government agencies and industries in China, as well as renowned economists and academics around the world.

=== CAIJING Forum ===
Each year CAIJING Magazine hosts a series of conferences, forums and events branded as CAIJING Forum. Focusing on major institutional reforms, policy changes and major developments tied to China's economic transformation, CAIJING Forum has established itself as a top-tier platform for interaction among key politicians, business leaders and academia.
