= Scott Barrett (political scientist) =

American economist

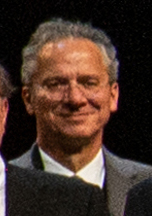
Scott Barrett, in 2019.

Scott Barrett is a professor of natural resource economics at Columbia University. There, he holds the title of Lenfest Professor of Natural Resource Economics at the School of International and Public Affairs and The Earth Institute.

He is known for his game theoretical analysis of climate change treaties. His book on the subject ''Environment and Statecraft: The Strategy of Environmental Treaty Making'' was published in 2003. He has been involved in the discussions of the Kyoto Treaty and its comparison to the more successful Montreal Protocol. More recently, he has been publishing on the institutions set up to control the regional and global spread of infectious diseases.

His latest book, ''Why Cooperate? The Incentive to Supply Global Public Goods'', was published by Oxford University Press in September 2007. This book examines a wide range of issues, from nuclear proliferation to infectious disease pandemics, from over-fishing to peacekeeping, from asteroid defense to big science, from the standard for determining the time to international development.

Before joining Columbia University, Barrett taught at The Paul H. Nitze School of Advanced International Studies (SAIS), Johns Hopkins University, the London Business School and was also affiliated with the University College London. His graduate work was at the London School of Economics.

Barrett was awarded an Honorary Doctorate of Laws by the University of Bath in 2016.

He was elected a Member of the National Academy of Sciences in 2024.
