= Sichan Siv =

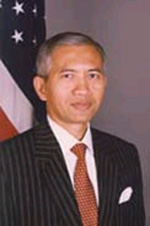
Official portrait, circa 2001

Sichan Siv (/ˈsiːtʃɑːn sɪv/ SEE-chahn siv) was the United States ambassador to the United Nations Economic and Social Council from 2001 to 2006. From 1989 to 1993, Ambassador Siv served at The White House as deputy assistant to President George H. W. Bush and at the State Department as deputy assistant secretary. He has also held various positions in the private sector and has written two books.

== Biography ==
Siv was born in Pochentong, Cambodia, in 1948. His entire family - 15 total, including his mother - were killed during Pol Pot's reign of terror. He arrived in the United States in 1976, and enrolled in the Master of International Affairs Program at Columbia University with a full scholarship. He became a US citizen in 1982. He was a volunteer in George H. W. Bush's 1988 presidential campaign and was appointed as his deputy assistant in 1989. He was the first American of Asian Ancestry to hold that position. He later attended the U.S. Army War College. In 2001, Siv was unanimously confirmed by the Senate and appointed by President George W. Bush as the United States ambassador to the United Nations Economic and Social Council, a position he held until 2006. In 2006, he moved to Texas. In 2021, Siv endowed a scholarship at the University of Texas at Austin for undergraduate students.

== Awards ==
He is the recipient of the George H.W. Bush Award for Outstanding Public Service, DAR Americanism Medal, U.S. Army Commander's Award, and Brazilian Academy of Art, Culture and History Honors. He has been a volunteer in the Civil Air Patrol and an honorary commander of the U.S. Air Force. He was conferred an Honorary Doctoral Degree in public service from The University of Cambodia in 2011.

== Literary works ==
Siv has authored two books: Golden Bones: An Extraordinary Journey from Hell in Cambodia to a New Life in America (2009) and Golden State, Love and Conflict in Hostile Lands (2014).
