= International security =

Measures taken to ensure mutual safety

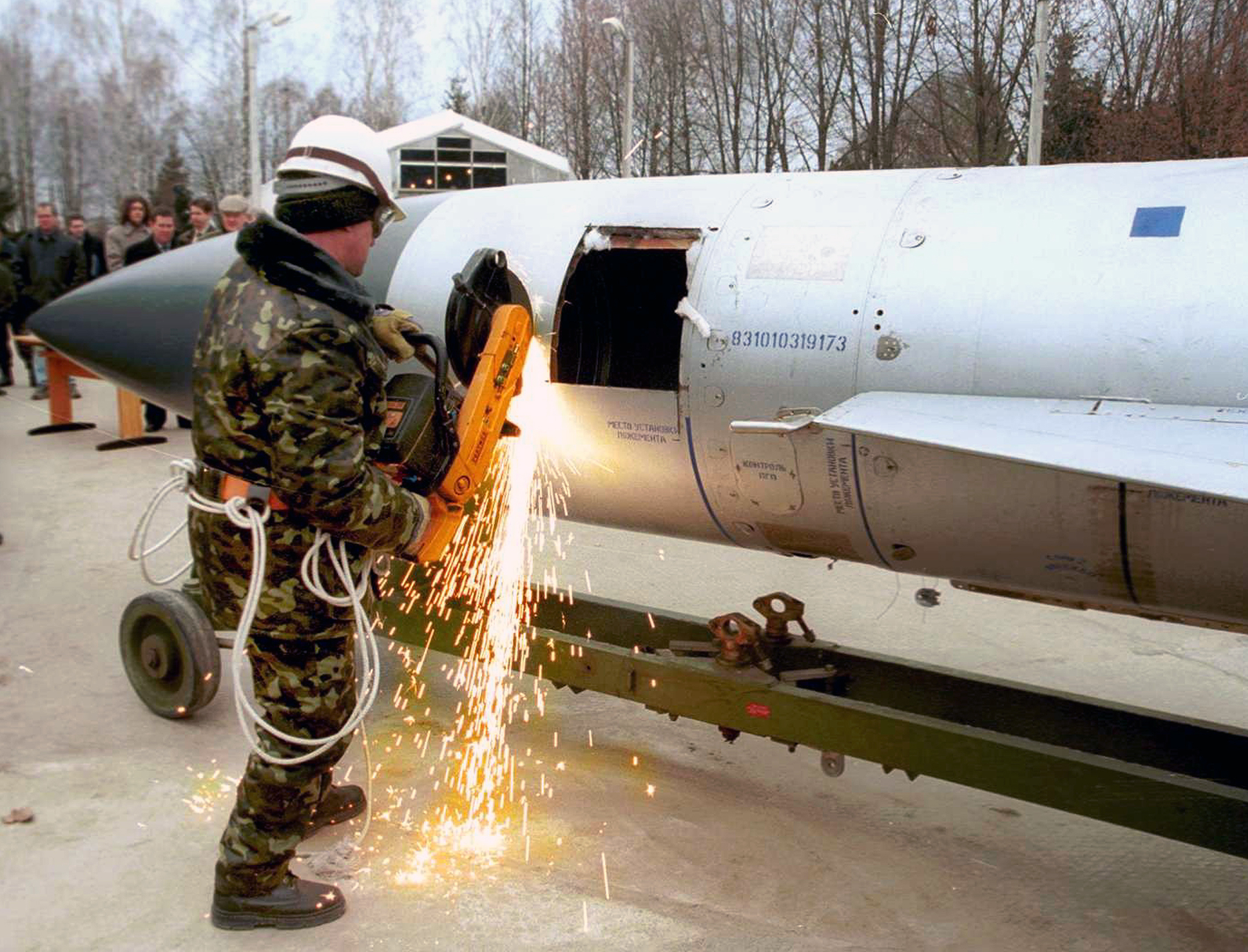
A Ukrainian begins the first cut on a Kh-22 air-to-surface missile during elimination activities at an air base in Ozerne, Ukraine, in March 2004. The weapon was eliminated under the Cooperative Threat Reduction program implemented by the Defense Threat Reduction Agency.

International security is a term which refers to the measures taken by states and international organizations, such as the United Nations, European Union, and others, to ensure mutual survival and safety. These measures include military action and diplomatic agreements such as treaties and conventions. International and national security are invariably linked. International security is national security or state security in the global arena.

By the end of World War II, a new subject of academic study, security studies, focusing on international security emerged. It began as an independent field of study, but was absorbed as a sub-field of international relations. Since it took hold in the 1950s, the study of international security has been at the heart of international relations. It covers areas such as security studies, strategic studies, peace studies, and other areas.

The meaning of "security" is often treated as a common sense term that can be understood by "unacknowledged consensus". The content of international security has expanded over the years. Today it covers a variety of interconnected issues in the world that affect survival. It ranges from the traditional or conventional modes of military power, the causes and consequences of war between states, economic strength, to ethnic, religious and ideological conflicts, trade and economic conflicts, energy supplies, science and technology, food, as well as threats to human security and the stability of states from environmental degradation, infectious diseases, climate change and the activities of non-state actors.

While the wide perspective of international security regards everything as a security matter, the traditional approach focuses mainly or exclusively on military concerns.

== Concepts of security in the international arena ==
Edward Kolodziej has compared international security to a Tower of Babel and Roland Paris (2004) views it as "in the eye of the beholder". Security has been widely applied to "justify suspending civil liberties, making war, and massively reallocating resources during the last fifty years".

Walter Lippmann (1944) views security as the capability of a country to protect its core values, both in terms that a state need not sacrifice core values in avoiding war and can maintain them by winning war. David Baldwin (1997) argues that pursuing security sometimes requires sacrificing other values, including marginal values and prime values. Richard Ullman (1983) has suggested that a decrease in vulnerability is security.

Arnold Wolfers (1952) argues that "security" is generally a normative term. It is applied by nations "in order to be either expedient—a rational means toward an accepted end—or moral, the best or least evil course of action". In the same way that people are different in sensing and identifying danger and threats, Wolfers argues that different nations also have different expectations of security. Not only is there a difference between forbearance of threats, but different nations also face different levels of threats because of their unique geographical, economic, ecological, and political environment.

Barry Buzan (2000) views the study of international security as more than a study of threats, but also a study of which threats that can be tolerated and which require immediate action. He sees the concept of security as not either power or peace, but something in between.

The concept of an international security actor has extended in all directions since the 1990s, from nations to groups, individuals, international systems, NGOs, and local governments.

== Traditional security ==
The traditional security paradigm refers to a realist construct of security in which the referent object of security is the state. The prevalence of this theorem reached a peak during the Cold War. For almost half a century, major world powers entrusted the security of their nation to a balance of power among states. In this sense international stability relied on the premise that if state security is maintained, then the security of citizens will necessarily follow. Traditional security relied on the anarchistic balance of power, a military build-up between the United States and the Soviet Union (the two superpowers), and on the absolute sovereignty of the nation state. States were deemed to be rational entities, national interests and policy driven by the desire for absolute power. Security was seen as protection from invasion; executed during proxy conflicts using technical and military capabilities.

As Cold War tensions receded, it became clear that the security of citizens was threatened by hardships arising from internal state activities as well as external aggressors. Civil wars were increasingly common and compounded existing poverty, disease, hunger, violence and human rights abuses. Traditional security policies had effectively masked these underlying basic human needs in the face of state security. Through neglect of its constituents, nation states had failed in their primary objective.

In the historical debate on how best to achieve national security, writers like Hobbes, Machiavelli, and Rousseau tended to paint a rather pessimistic picture of the implications of state sovereignty. The international system was viewed as a rather brutal arena in which states would seek to achieve their own security at the expense of their neighbors. Inter-state relations were seen as a struggle for power, as states constantly attempted to take advantage of each other. According to this view, permanent peace was unlikely to be achieved. All that states could do was to try to balance the power of other states to prevent any one from achieving overall hegemony. This view was shared by writers such as E.H. Carr and Hans Morgenthau.

More recently, the traditional state-centric notion of security has been challenged by more holistic approaches to security. Among the approaches which seeks to acknowledge and address these basic threats to human safety are paradigms that include cooperative, comprehensive and collective measures, aimed to ensure security for the individual and, as a result, for the state.

=== Theoretical approaches ===
==== Realism ====
===== Classical realism =====
In the field of international relations, realism has long been a dominant theory, from ancient military theories and writings of Chinese and Greek thinkers, Sun Tzu and Thucydides being two of the more notable, to Hobbes, Machiavelli and Rousseau. It is the foundation of contemporary international security studies. The twentieth century classical realism is mainly derived from Edward Hallett Carr's book The Twenty Years' Crisis. The realist views anarchy and the absence of a power to regulate the interactions between states as the distinctive characteristics of international politics. Because of anarchy, or a constant state of antagonism, the international system differs from the domestic system. Realism has a variety of sub-schools whose lines of thought are based on three core assumptions: groupism, egoism, and power-centrism. According to classical realists, bad things happen because the people who make foreign policy are sometimes bad.

===== Neorealism =====
Beginning in the 1960s, with increasing criticism of realism, Kenneth Waltz tried to revive the traditional realist theory by translating some core realist ideas into a deductive, top-down theoretical framework that eventually came to be called neorealism. Theory of International Politics brought together and clarified many earlier realist ideas about how the features of the overall system of states affects the way states interact:

"Neorealism answers questions: Why the modern states-system has persisted in the face of attempts by certain states at dominance; why war among great powers recurred over centuries; and why states often find cooperation hard. In addition, the book forwarded one more specific theory: that great-power war would tend to be more frequent in multipolarity (an international system shaped by the power of three or more major states) than bipolarity (an international system shaped by two major states, or superpowers)."

The main theories of neorealism are balance of power theory, balance of threat theory, security dilemma theory, offense-defense theory, hegemonic stability theory and power transition theory.

==== Liberalism ====
Liberalism has a shorter history than realism but has been a prominent theory since World War I. It is a concept with a variety of meanings. Liberal thinking dates back to philosophers such as Thomas Paine and Immanuel Kant, who argued that republican constitutions produce peace. Kant's concept of Perpetual Peace is arguably seen as the starting point of contemporary liberal thought.

===== Economic liberalism =====
Economic liberalism assumes that economic openness and interdependence between countries makes them more peaceful than countries who are isolated. Eric Gartzke has written that economic freedom is 50 times more effective than democracy in creating peace. Globalization has been important to economic liberalism.

===== Liberal institutionalism =====
Liberal institutionalism views international institutions as the main factor to avoid conflicts between nations. Liberal institutionalists argue that; although the anarchic system presupposed by realists cannot be made to disappear by institutions; the international environment that is constructed can influence the behavior of states within the system. Varieties of international governmental organizations (IGOs) and international non-governmental organizations (INGOs) are seen as contributors to world peace.

Some believe that these international institutions lead to neotrusteeship, or postmodern imperialism. International institutions lead to an interconnectedness between strong and weak or post-conflict nations. In a situation such as a collapsed, weak-nation without the means of autonomous recovery, international institutions often lead to involvement by a stronger nation to aid in recovery. Because there is no definite international security policy to address weak or post-conflict nations, stronger nations sometimes face "mission-creep," a shift from supplying and aiding nations to an escalation of mission goals, when aiding weaker nations. In addition, there is some debate due to lack of testing that international intervention is not the best institution to aid weak or post-war nations. Possible mission-creep, as well as inefficiencies in international intervention, creates debate as to the effectiveness of international institutions in peacekeeping.

==== Comparison between realism and liberalism ====
Realist and liberal security systems
Theoretical base		Realist (alliance)	Liberal (community of law)
Structure of the international system		Material; static; anarchic; self-help system	Social; dynamic; governance without government
Conceptions of security	Basic principles	Accumulation of power	Integration
	Strategies	Military deterrence; control of allies	Democratization; conflict resolution; rule of Law
Institutional features	Functional scope	Military realm only	Multiple issue areas
	Criterion for membership	Strategic relevance	Democratic system of rule
	Internal power structure	Reflects distribution of power; most likely hegemonic	Symmetrical; high degree of interdependence
	Decision-making	Will of dominant power prevails	Democratically legitimized
Relation of system to its environment		Dissociated; perception of threat	Serves as an attractive model; open for association

==== Constructivism ====
Since its founding in the 1980s, constructivism has become an influential approach in international security studies. "It is less a theory of international relations or security, however, than a broader social theory which then informs how we might approach the study of security." Constructivists argue that security is a social construction. They emphasize the importance of social, cultural and historical factors, which leads to different actors construing similar events differently.

=== Women in international security ===
As stated previously on this page, international and national security are inherently linked. Former U.S. Secretary of State Hillary Clinton has been prominent in highlighting the importance of women in national and thus international security. In what has been referred to as "the Hillary Doctrine", she highlights the adversarial relationship between extremism and women's liberation in making the point that with women's freedom comes the liberation of whole societies. As states like Egypt and Pakistan grant more rights to women, further liberation and stability within such countries will inevitably ensue, fostering greater security throughout the international realm. Along the same lines, Secretary of State John Kerry stated that "no country can get ahead if it leaves half of its people behind. This is why the United States believes gender equality is critical to our shared goals of prosperity, stability, and peace, and why investing in women and girls worldwide is critical to advancing US foreign policy". Elevating women to equal standing internationally will help achieve greater peace and security. This can be seen in both developmental and economic factors, as just two examples among many. Built into American foreign policy is the idea that empowering women leads to greater international development due to their increased ability to maintain "the well-being of their families and communities, drive social progress, and stabilize societies." Female empowerment through economic investment, such as supporting their participation in the workforce, allows women to sustain their families and contribute to overall economic growth in their communities. Such principles must be propagated nationally and globally in order to increase the agency of women to achieve the necessary gender equality for international security.

There is much consideration within feminist international relations (IR) surrounding the importance of female presence to international security. The inclusion of women in discussions surrounding international cooperation increases the likelihood of new questions being asked that may not be given consideration in an otherwise masculine-dominated environment. As a renowned theorist within Feminist IR, J. Ann Tickner points out questions that women would likely be more inclined to ask in regards to war and peace. For example, why men have been the predominant actors in combat, how gender hierarchies contribute to the legitimation of war, and the consequences of associating women with peace. In general, the main issue of concern to feminists within IR is why in political, social, and economic realms, femininity remains inferior to masculinity, as they see the effects of this transcendental hierarchy both nationally and internationally. Such considerations contribute significant perspective to the role that women play in maintaining peaceful conditions of international security.

Despite acknowledgment of the importance of recognizing women's role in maintaining international security by Clinton, Kerry, and conceivably many others, the fact remains that women are disproportionately presented as victims, rather than actors or leaders. This can be derived by looking at information and statistics presented in Joni Seager's book The Penguin Atlas of Women in the World. For example, in combat zones, women face heightened risks of sexual assault, and their familial responsibilities are complicated by reduced access to necessary resources. In terms of governmental presence, (to support their role as leaders), women have not yet achieved equal representation in any state, and very few countries have legislative bodies that are more than 25% female. While prominent female politicians are becoming more frequent, "women leaders around the world like those who become presidents or prime ministers or foreign ministers or heads of corporations cannot be seen as tokens that give everyone else in society the change to say we've taken care of our women". This statement by Clinton reiterates the necessity to confront such on-going challenges to female participation, making such issues pertinent to international security.

==== Prominent thinkers ====
- Robert Axelrod – Liberal institutionalism
- Barry Buzan – Copenhagen School
- Edward Hallett Carr – Classical realism
- Robert Gilpin – Neorealism
- Thomas Hobbes – Classical realism
- Robert Jervis – Neorealism
- Immanuel Kant – Kantian liberalism
- Peter J. Katzenstein – Constructivism
- Robert Keohane – Liberal institutionalism
- Machiavelli – Classical realism
- John Mearsheimer – Neorealism
- Hans J. Morgenthau – Classical realism
- Joseph Nye – Liberal institutionalism
- Kathryn Sikkink – Constructivism
- Thucydides – Classical realism
- Kenneth Waltz – Neorealism
- Alexander Wendt – Constructivism

== Human security ==
Human security derives from the traditional concept of security from military threats to the safety of people and communities. It is an extension of mere existence (survival) to well-being and dignity of human beings. Human security is an emerging school of thought about the practice of international security. Under The United Nations Office for the Coordination of Humanitarian Affairs (OCHA), the Commission on Human Security (CHS), in its final report, Human Security Now defines human security as "…to protect the vital core of all human lives in ways that enhance human freedoms and human fulfillment." Critics of the concept of human security claim that it covers almost everything and that it is too broad to be the focus of research. There have also been criticisms of its challenge to the role of states and their sovereignty. The challenge continues with the debate between responsibility for protection of the international community versus the sovereignty of each state.

Human security offers a critique of and advocates an alternative to the traditional state-based conception of security. Essentially, it argues that the proper referent for security is the individual and that state practices should reflect this rather than primarily focusing on securing borders through unilateral military action. The justification for the human security approach is said to be that the traditional conception of security is no longer appropriate or effective in the highly interconnected and interdependent modern world in which global threats such as poverty, environmental degradation, and terrorism supersede the traditional security threats of interstate attack and warfare. Further, state-interest-based arguments for human security propose that the international system is too interconnected for the state to maintain an isolationist international policy. Therefore, it argues that a state can best maintain its security and the security of its citizens by ensuring the security of others. It is need to be noted that without the traditional security no human security can be assured.

Human security is more aligned with non-traditional threats of international security. Compared to the traditional security issues, human security "has been related more to nation-states than to people." Thus, the emphasis on security transitions from territorial security between states to the individual people's security. The two main components includes freedom from fear and freedom from want. The list of human security threats is broad, but can be narrowed under seven main categories: economic security, food security, health security, environmental security, personal security, community security, and political security. Some examples include human trafficking, disease, environmental and natural disasters, degradation, poverty, and more.

Traditional vs Human Security
Type of security	Referent	Responsibility	Threats
Traditional	The state	Integrity of the state	Interstate war, nuclear proliferation, revolution, civil conflict
Human	The individual	Integrity of the individual	Disease, poverty, natural disaster, violence, landmines, human rights abuses

=== UNDP human security proposal ===
The 1994 UNDP Human Development Report (HDR) proposes that increasing human security entails:

- Investing in human development, not in arms;
- Engaging policy makers to address the emerging peace dividend;
- Giving the United Nations a clear mandate to promote and sustain development;
- Enlarging the concept of development cooperation so that it includes all flows, not just aid;
- Agreeing that 20 percent of national budgets and 20 percent of foreign aid be used for human development; and
- Establishing an Economic Security Council.

The report elaborates on seven components to human security. Tadjbakhsh and Chenoy list them as follows:

Components of human security as per the HDR 1994 report
Type of security	Definition	Threats
Economic security	An assured basic income	Poverty, unemployment, indebtedness, lack of income
Food security	Physical and economic access to basic food	Hunger, famines and the lack of physical and economic access to basic food
Health security	Protection from diseases and unhealthy lifestyles	Inadequate health care, new and recurrent diseases including epidemics and pandemics, poor nutrition and unsafe environment, unsafe lifestyles
Environmental security	Healthy physical environment	Environmental degradation, natural disasters, pollution and resource depletion
Personal security	Security from physical violence	From the state (torture), other states (war), groups of people (ethnic tension), individuals or gangs (crime), industrial, workplace or traffic accidents
Community security	Safe membership in a group	From the group (oppressive practices), between groups (ethnic violence), from dominant groups (e.g. indigenous people vulnerability)
Political security	Living in a society that honors basic human rights	Political or state repression, including torture, disappearance, human rights violations, detention and imprisonment

== See also ==
- Democratic peace theory
- Global catastrophic risk
- Peace and conflict studies
- Security studies
- Territorial peace theory
- Violent non-state actor
