= Offshore balancing =

Strategic concept in international relations

Offshore balancing is a strategic concept used in realist analysis in international relations. It describes a strategy in which a great power uses favored regional powers to check the rise of potentially-hostile powers. This strategy stands in contrast to the dominant grand strategy in the United States, liberal hegemony. Offshore balancing calls for the United States to withdraw from onshore positions and focus its offshore capabilities on the three key geopolitical regions of the world: East Asia, Europe, and the Persian Gulf.

== History ==
Christopher Layne attributes the introduction of the term "offshore balancing" to himself in his 1997 article. Several experts on strategy, such as John Mearsheimer, Stephen Walt, Robert Pape, Andrew Latham, Patrick Porter, and Andrew Bacevich, have embraced the approach. They argue that offshore balancing has its historical roots in British grand strategy regarding Europe, which was eventually adopted and pursued by the United States and Japan at various points in their history.

According to political scientist John Mearsheimer, in his University of Chicago "American Grand Strategy" class, offshore balancing was the strategy used by the United States in the 1930s and also in the 1980–1988 Iran–Iraq War. Mearsheimer argues that when the United States gave Lend-Lease aid to Britain in the 1940s, the United States engaged in offshore balancing by being the arsenal of democracy, not the fighter for it.

That is consistent with offshore balancing because the United States initially did not want to commit American lives to the European conflict. The United States supported the losing side (Iraq) in the Iran–Iraq War to prevent the development of a regional hegemon, which could ultimately threaten American influence. Furthermore, offshore balancing can seem like isolationism when a rough balance of power in international relations exists, which was the case in the 1930s. It was also the strategy used during the Cold War between the United States and Soviet Union.

== Theory ==
The grand strategy of "offshore balancing" arguably permits a great power to maintain its power without the costs of large military deployments around the world. It can be seen as the informal-empire analogue to federalism in formal ones (for instance the proposal for the Imperial Federation in the late British Empire). Offshore balancing, as its name implies, is a grand strategy that can be pursued by the only non-Eurasian great power, the United States.

The strategy calls for this state to maintain a rough balance of power in the three key geopolitical regions of the world: East Asia, Europe, and the Persian Gulf. The three regions are the focus, since East Asia and Europe are the major industrial centers of the world, which contain all of the other great powers and the Persian Gulf for its importance to the global oil market. Outside of these regions, an offshore balancer should not worry about developments. Also, the state pursuing offshore balancing should first seek to pass the buck to local powers and intervene only if the threat is too great for the other powers in the region to handle.

== Notable thinkers associated with offshore balancing ==
- Christopher Layne
- John Mearsheimer
- Stephen Walt
- Robert Pape
- Barry Posen
- Michael Lind
- Andrew Bacevich

== See also ==
- Israel–United States relations
- Thucydides Trap

== Sources ==
- Christopher Layne (1997). "From Preponderance to Offshore Balancing: America's Future Grand Strategy". International Security.
- John J. Mearsheimer (December 2008). "A Return to Offshore Balancing". Newsweek.
- Stephen Walt (November 2011). "Offshore Balancing: An idea whose time has come". Foreign Policy.
- Zachary Keck (February 2014). "Stephen Walt is Not Obama's George Kennan". The Diplomat.
- Hal Brands (September 2015). "The Limits of Offshore Balancing". Strategic Studies Institute. Archived from the original on 2017-04-28.
- Mearsheimer, Walt (June 2016). "The Case for Offshore Balancing" (PDF). Foreign Affairs.
