= Man, the State, and War =

1959 book by Kenneth Waltz

- Author: Kenneth Waltz
- Language: English
- Genre: international relations theory
- Publication date: 1959
- Publication place: United States
- Preceded by: N/A
- Followed by: Foreign Policy and Democratic Politics: The American and British Experience

Man, the State, and War is a 1959 book on international relations by realist academic Kenneth Waltz.

The book is influential within the field of international relations theory for establishing the three 'images of analysis' used to explain conflict in international politics: the international system, the state, and the individual.

== Waltz's three images of international relations ==
Waltz's initial contribution to the field of international relations was his 1959 book, Man, the State, and War, which classified theories of the causes of war into three categories, or levels of analysis. Waltz refers to these levels of analysis as "images," and uses the writings of one or more classic political philosophers to outline the major points of each image. Each image has two chapters: the first describes what that image says about the causes of war using primarily the writings of classical philosophers, and the second typically features Waltz analyzing the advantages and disadvantages of that image.

=== First image: Individuals ===
The first image argues that wars are often caused by the nature of particular statesmen and political leaders such as state leaders, like Napoleon, or by human nature more generally. That is basically consistent with classical realism, which then dominated international relations but would be discussed by Waltz more fully in his next book, Theory of International Politics.

=== Second image: States ===
Theories of war that fall under the rubric of Waltz's second image contend that wars are caused by the domestic makeup of states. A prime example that Waltz refers to is Lenin's theory of imperialism, which posits that the main cause of war is rooted in the need for capitalist states to continue opening up new markets to perpetuate their economic system at home. A more familiar example in the Western world today is the notion that nondemocratic states, because of their internal composition, start wars.

=== Third image: International system ===
Waltz next assesses the first two images as being less influential in general than the third image, yet ultimately necessary in understanding the causes of War. Waltz concludes his 1959 book Man, the State, and War with a final explanation of the three images. The third image describing the framework of world politics and the first and second images, determining the forces that create the policies of a state. The third image posits that the cause of war is found at the systemic level; namely, that the anarchic structure of the international system is the root cause of war. In this context, "anarchy" is defined not as a condition of chaos or disorder but as one in which there is no sovereign body that governs the interactions between autonomous nation-states. In other words, unlike in domestic society in which citizens can theoretically rely on law enforcement agencies to protect their persons and property, if a state is invaded and calls "911," it cannot be sure anyone will answer.

Similarly, when two citizens have a dispute, they can appeal to the courts to render a verdict and, more importantly, the law enforcement agencies to enforce the court's ruling, but there is no body above nation-states that is capable of establishing rules or laws for all the states, deciding how these apply in specific cases, and compelling the states to honor the court's ruling. As a result, if an issue at stake is important enough to a state, it can achieve a satisfactory outcome only by using its power to impose its will on another state(s). The realization that at any point in time any state can resort to armed force, forces each state always be prepared for that contingency. These themes are fleshed out more fully in Theory of International Politics which, as the title suggests, lays out a theory for international politics as a whole rather than the narrower focus on what causes war.

== Reception ==
J. David Singer praised the book in a 1960 review, arguing that it was important for International Relations scholars to understand the assumptions behind their research. Singer defended Waltz's choice of three levels of analysis, as Singer argued that other potential levels of analysis (such as including the "pressure group, socio-economic class, or political party") were unnecessary, as those groups primarily influenced world politics through the state. Singer expressed skepticism about Waltz's claim that the international system was the most important cause of war, with Singer arguing that the behavior of individuals can alter the international system and that it ultimately falls to individuals to understand what the incentive structure of the system is. He wrote, "one might well argue that the key variable is not actually the system itself, but the way in which that system is perceived, evaluated, and responded to by the decision makers in the several and separate states."

== See also ==
- On War
- Social Theory of International Politics
- The Tragedy of Great Power Politics
- Theory of International Politics
