= Charles L. Glaser =

Charles Louis Glaser (born 1954) is a scholar of international relations theory, known for his work on defensive realism, as well as nuclear strategy and U.S. policy toward China. He is a Senior Fellow in the Security Studies Program at MIT and an Emeritus Professor of Political Science and International Affairs at George Washington. He was the founding director of the Institute for Security and Conflict Studies at the George Washington University's Elliott School of International Affairs, as well as a professor of political science and international affairs. His best-known book, Rational Theory of International Politics: The Logic of Competition and Cooperation (Princeton University Press, 2010) received an Honorable Mention for 2011 Best Book from the International Security Studies Section of the International Studies Association.

In 2018 he was awarded the International Studies Association, Security Studies Section, Distinguished Scholar Award. In 2019 he received the George Washington Distinguished Scholar award. In 2021 he was awarded the National Academy of Sciences’ William and Katherine Estes Award for behavior research toward the prevention of nuclear war.

== Academic career ==
Glaser's research focuses on international relations theory and international security policy. He has contributed to the ideas of defensive realism, the security dilemma, the offense-defense balance, and arms races through various publications and articles.

In Rational Theory of International Politics, he outlines three factors that affect a state's security strategies: the material capabilities of a state, the information it has about the intentions and capabilities of other states, and the state's motives. Here, he distinguishes between motives that are "security-seeking" or "greedy." The book provides a defensive realist approach to international relations. It rejects that the international system consistently favors competitive behavior between states. The book was debated in an issue of Security Studies. According to LSE international relations scholar Chris Brown, Glaser's book is "the most sophisticated account of structural realism since that of [Kenneth] Waltz."

In a 2019 article for International Security, Glaser argued that the concept of a "liberal international order" was flawed and that many of the outcomes purportedly explained by the liberal international order (such as "cooperation under anarchy, effective Western balancing against the Soviet Union, the Cold War peace, and the lack of balancing against the United States following the Cold War") could be better accounted for by defensive realism.

Glaser received a doctorate from the Kennedy School of Government at Harvard University. He also holds an M.A. in physics and an MPP from Harvard University, as well as a B.S. in physics from MIT. Glaser was the Emmett Dedmon professor of public policy and acting dean at the Harris School of Public Policy at the University of Chicago prior to George Washington University. He has also taught political science at the University of Michigan and was a visiting fellow at Stanford University's Center for International Security and Cooperation. He has served as a strategic analyst for the Joint Staff in the Pentagon, and was a peace fellow at the United States Institute of Peace, as well as a research associate at the Center for International Studies at MIT.

== Select publications ==
=== Books ===
- Retrench, Defend, Compete: Securing America's Future Against a Rising China (Cornell University Press, 2025)
- Rational Theory of International Politics: The Logic of Competition and Cooperation (Princeton University Press, 2010) ISBN 978-0691143729; William C. Wohlforth of Dartmouth College said that the book is "destined to be one of the most important books on international relations theory."
- Analyzing Strategic Nuclear Policy (Princeton University Press, 1990) ISBN 978-0691023120

=== Articles ===
- "Why unipolarity doesn't matter (much),"Cambridge Review of International Affairs, v24 n2 (June 2011): 135-147
- "Counterforce Revisited: Assessing the Nuclear Posture Review's New Missions," International Security, v30 n2 (Autumn, 2005): 84-126 (with Steve Fetter)
- "When Are Arms Races Dangerous? Rational versus Suboptimal Arming," International Security, v28 n4 (Spring, 2004): 44-84
- “The Security Dilemma Revisited.” World Politics Vol. 50, No. 01 （October 1997） pp. 171–201.
- Charles L. Glaser and Chairn Kaufmann, “What is the offense-defense balance and how can we measure it?.” International Security Vol. 22, No. 4, （Spring 1998） pp. 44–82.
- "Political consequences of military strategy: Expanding and refining the spiral and deterrence models." World politics 44, no. 04 (1992): 497–538.
- “Realists as Optimists: Cooperation as Self-help." International security Vol. 19, No. 3, Winter, （1994-1995）:50-90
