= Neorealism (international relations) =

Theory of international relations

Neorealism or structural realism is a theory of international relations that emphasizes the role of power politics in international relations, sees competition and conflict as enduring features and sees limited potential for cooperation. The anarchic state of the international system means that states cannot be certain of other states' intentions and their security, thus prompting them to engage in power politics.

It was first outlined by Kenneth Waltz in his 1979 book Theory of International Politics. Alongside neoliberalism, neorealism is one of the two most influential contemporary approaches to international relations; the two perspectives dominated international relations theory from the 1960s to the 1990s.

Neorealism emerged from the North American discipline of political science, and reformulates the classical realist tradition of E. H. Carr, Hans Morgenthau, George Kennan, and Reinhold Niebuhr. Neorealism is subdivided into defensive and offensive neorealism.

== Origins ==
Neorealism is an ideological departure from Hans Morgenthau's writing on classical realism. Classical realism originally explained the machinations of international politics as being based on human nature and therefore subject to the ego and emotion of world leaders. Neorealist thinkers instead propose that structural constraints—not strategy, egoism, or motivation—will determine behavior in international relations. John Mearsheimer made significant distinctions between his version of offensive neorealism and Morgenthau in his book titled The Tragedy of Great Power Politics.

== Theory ==
Structural realism holds that the nature of the international structure is defined by its ordering principle (anarchy), units of the system (states), and by the distribution of capabilities (measured by the number of great powers within the international system), with only the last being considered an independent variable with any meaningful change over time. The anarchic ordering principle of the international structure is decentralized, meaning there is no formal central authority; every sovereign state is formally equal in this system. These states act according to the logic of egoism, meaning states seek their own interest and will not subordinate their interest to the interests of other states.

States are assumed at a minimum to want to ensure their own survival as this is a prerequisite to pursue other goals. This driving force of survival is the primary factor influencing their behavior and in turn ensures states develop offensive military capabilities for foreign interventionism and as a means to increase their relative power. Because states can never be certain of other states' future intentions, there is a lack of trust between states which requires them to be on guard against relative losses of power which could enable other states to threaten their survival. This lack of trust, based on uncertainty, is called the security dilemma.

States are deemed similar in terms of needs but not in capabilities for achieving them. The positional placement of states in terms of abilities determines the distribution of capabilities. The structural distribution of capabilities then limits cooperation among states through fears of relative gains made by other states, and the possibility of dependence on other states. The desire and relative abilities of each state to maximize relative power constrain each other, resulting in a balance of power, which shapes international relations. It also gives rise to the security dilemma that all nations face. There are two ways in which states balance power: internal balancing and external balancing. Internal balancing occurs as states grow their own capabilities by increasing economic growth and/or increasing military spending. External balancing occurs as states enter into alliances to check the power of more powerful states or alliances.

Neorealism sees states as black boxes, as the structure of the international system is emphasized rather than the units and their unique characteristics within it as being causal.

Neorealists contend that there are essentially three possible systems according to changes in the distribution of capabilities, defined by the number of great powers within the international system. A unipolar system contains only one great power, a bipolar system contains two great powers, and a multipolar system contains more than two great powers. Neorealists conclude that a bipolar system is more stable (less prone to great power war and systemic change) than a multipolar system because balancing can only occur through internal balancing as there are no extra great powers with which to form alliances. Because there is only internal balancing in a bipolar system, rather than external balancing, there is less opportunity for miscalculations and therefore less chance of great power war. That is a simplification and a theoretical ideal.

Neorealists argue that processes of emulation and competition lead states to behave in the aforementioned ways. Emulation leads states to adopt the behaviors of successful states (for example, those victorious in war), whereas competition leads states to vigilantly ensure their security and survival through the best means possible. Due to the anarchic nature of the international system and the inability of states to rely on other states or organizations, states have to engage in "self-help."

For neorealists, social norms are considered largely irrelevant. This is in contrast to some classical realists which did see norms as potentially important. Neorealists are also skeptical of the ability of international organizations to act independently in the international system and facilitate cooperation between states.

=== Defensive realism ===
Structural realism has become divided into two branches, defensive and offensive realism, following the publication of Mearsheimer's The Tragedy of Great Power Politics in 2001. Waltz's original formulation of neorealism is now sometimes called defensive realism, while Mearsheimer's modification of the theory is referred to as offensive realism. Both branches agree that the structure of the system is what causes states to compete, but defensive realism posits that most states concentrate on maintaining their security (i.e. states are security maximizers), while offensive realism claims that all states seek to gain as much power as possible (i.e. states are power maximizers). A foundational study in the area of defensive realism is Robert Jervis' classic 1978 article on the "security dilemma." It examines how uncertainty and the offense-defense balance may heighten or soften the security dilemma. Building on Jervis, Stephen Van Evera explores the causes of war from a defensive realist perspective.

=== Offensive realism ===
Offensive realism, developed by Mearsheimer differs in the amount of power that states desire. Mearsheimer proposes that states maximize relative power ultimately aiming for regional hegemony.

In addition to Mearsheimer, a number of other scholars have sought to explain why states expand when opportunities to do so arise. For instance, Randall Schweller refers to states' revisionist agendas to account for their aggressive military action. Eric Labs investigates the expansion of war aims during wartime as an example of offensive behavior. Fareed Zakaria analyzes the history of US foreign relations from 1865 to 1914 and asserts that foreign interventions during this period were not motivated by worries about external threats but by a desire to expand US influence.

== Scholarly debate ==
=== Within realist thought ===
While neorealists agree that the structure of the international relations is the primary impetus in seeking security, there is disagreement among neorealist scholars as to whether states merely aim to survive or whether states want to maximize their relative power. The former represents the ideas of Kenneth Waltz, while the latter represents the ideas of John Mearsheimer and offensive realism.

Other debates include the extent to which states balance against power (in Waltz's original neorealism and classic realism) versus the extent to which states balance against threats (as introduced in Stephen Walt's The Origins of Alliances (1987)), or balance against competing interests (as introduced in Randall Schweller's Deadly Imbalances (1998)). Neorealists also disagree on the effects of polarity on great-power wars, with scholars such as Dale C. Copeland and Dylan Motin arguing that historical bipolar systems have often been more violent than multipolar ones.

=== With other schools of thought ===
Neorealists conclude that because war is an effect of the anarchic structure of the international system, it is likely to continue in the future. Indeed, neorealists often argue that the ordering principle of the international system has not fundamentally changed from the time of Thucydides to the advent of nuclear warfare. The view that long-lasting peace is not likely to be achieved is described by other theorists as a largely pessimistic view of international relations. One of the main challenges to neorealist theory is the democratic peace theory and supporting research, such as the book Never at War. Neorealists answer this challenge by arguing that democratic peace theorists tend to pick and choose the definition of democracy to achieve the desired empirical result. For example, the Germany of Kaiser Wilhelm II, the Dominican Republic of Juan Bosch, and the Chile of Salvador Allende are not considered to be "democracies of the right kind" or the conflicts do not qualify as wars according to these theorists. Furthermore, they claim several wars between democratic states have been averted only by causes other than ones covered by democratic peace theory.

Advocates of democratic peace theory see the spreading of democracy as helping to mitigate the effects of anarchy. With enough democracies in the world, Bruce Russett thinks that it "may be possible in part to supersede the 'realist' principles (anarchy, the security dilemma of states) that have dominated practice ... since at least the seventeenth century." John Mueller believes that it is not the spreading of democracy but rather other conditions (e.g., power) that bring about democracy and peace. In consenting with Mueller's argument, Kenneth Waltz notes that "some of the major democracies—Britain in the nineteenth century and the United States in the twentieth century—have been among the most powerful states of their eras."

One of the most notable schools contending with neorealist thought, aside from neoliberalism, is the constructivist school, which is often seen to disagree with the neorealist focus on power and instead emphasizes a focus on ideas and identity as an explanatory point for international relations trends. Recently, however, a school of thought called the English School merges neorealist tradition with the constructivist technique of analyzing social norms to provide an increasing scope of analysis for international relations.

== Criticism ==
Neorealism has been criticized from various directions. Other major paradigms of international relations scholarship, such as liberal and constructivist approaches have criticized neorealist scholarship in terms of theory and empirics. Within realism, classical realists, and neoclassical realists have also challenged some aspects of neorealism.

Among the issues that neorealism has been criticized over is the neglect of domestic politics, race, gains from trade, the pacifying effects of institutions, and the relevance of regime type for foreign policy behavior.

David Strang argues that neorealist predictions fail to account for transformations in sovereignty over time and across regions. These transformations in sovereignty have had implications for cooperation and competition, as polities that were recognized as sovereign have seen considerably greater stability.

In response to criticisms that neorealism lacks relevance for contemporary international policy and does a poor job explaining the foreign policy behavior of major powers, Charles Glaser wrote in 2003, "this is neither surprising nor a serious problem, because scholars who use a realist lens to understand international politics can, and have, without inconsistency or contradiction also employed other theories to understand issues that fall outside realism's central focus."

In 2025, Anthony Heron proposed ‘regional neorealism’, which emerged as a theoretical framework that reinterprets neorealism through a regional lens, emphasizing geography as a primary driver of geopolitical competition and state behavior.

== Notable neorealists ==
- Robert J. Art
- Richard K. Betts
- Robert Gilpin
- Robert W. Tucker
- Joseph Grieco
- Robert Jervis
- Christopher Layne
- Jack Snyder
- John Mearsheimer
- Stephen Walt
- Kenneth Waltz
- Stephen Van Evera
- Barry Posen
- Charles L. Glaser
- Marc Trachtenberg

== See also ==
- International legal theories
- Realism (international relations)
- International relations theory
- Foreign interventionism
- Mercantilism
- Neofunctionalism
- Neoliberalism
- Realpolitik
