= Jack Snyder (political scientist) =

American political scientist (born 1951)

- Born: Jack Lewis Snyder; February 6, 1951 (age 75); Allentown, Pennsylvania, U.S.
- Awards: Karl Deutsch Award (1991)

Academic background
- Education: Harvard University (BA); Columbia University (PhD)

Academic work
- Discipline: International relations
- School or tradition: Neoclassical realism
- Institutions: Columbia University
- Notable ideas: Offensive and defensive realism

Jack Lewis Snyder (born February 6, 1951) is an American political scientist who is the Robert and Renée Belfer Professor of International Relations at Columbia University, specializing in theories of international relations.

Snyder's research centers around the relationship between violence and government. He is known for introducing the distinction between offensive and defensive realism into the international relations literature in his 1991 book Myths of Empire.

== Early life and education ==
Snyder was born in February 1951 in Allentown, Pennsylvania. He attended Harvard University as an undergraduate, receiving a B.A. in government in 1973. From 1973 to 1975 he was on the research staff of the Wednesday Group (a grouping of liberal Republicans), and later the foreign policy staff of Illinois senator Charles H. Percy.

He pursued graduate studies at Columbia University, first receiving a certificate from the Harriman Institute (then known as the Russian Institute) in 1978 before receiving his PhD in international relations in 1981. He was a postdoctoral fellow at Harvard's Center for International Affairs before returning to teach at Columbia.

== Academic career ==
It was in his Myths of Empire that Snyder first drew a distinction between offensive and defensive realism.

Much of Snyder's work presents challenges to the fundamental assumption of democratic peace theory: that democracies do not go to war with each other and that, therefore, democratization leads to a reduction in interstate conflict. In From Voting to Violence he argues that, rather than encourage peace, poorly managed democratization processes have often produced upsurges in nationalism and ethnic violence, as threatened political elites seek to thwart moves towards popular rule. He cites as examples Weimar Germany and the internationally sponsored 1993 presidential elections in Burundi (which led to the outbreak of a civil war later that year).

In Electing to Fight, Snyder and Mansfield argue emerging democracies with weak political institutions are more rather than less likely to go war, as their leaders often seek to rally support by invoking external threats and employing belligerent, nationalist rhetoric. Mansfield and Snyder demonstrate this pattern in a number of cases, ranging from revolutionary France to contemporary Russia under Putin. Snyder suggests that the way to avoid nationalist conflict is to promote the growth of robust civic institutions and a solid middle class prior to democratization.

His students at Columbia included Colin Kahl, former U.S. Under Secretary of Defense for Policy.

== Other activities ==
Snyder was Director of Columbia's Institute of War and Peace Studies from 1994 to 1997 and chair of Columbia's political science department from 1997 to 2000.

== Selected bibliography ==
=== Books ===
- Snyder, Jack (2012). Power and Progress: International Politics in Transition. London: Routledge. ISBN 9781136467684.
- Snyder, Jack; Mansfield, Edward (2005). Electing to Fight: Why Emerging Democracies Go to War. Cambridge: MIT Press. ISBN 9780262134491.
- Snyder, Jack (2000). From Voting to Violence: Democratization and Nationalist Conflict. New York: W.W. Norton. ISBN 9780393974812.
- Snyder, Jack (1991). Myths of Empire: Domestic Politics and International Ambition. Ithaca: Cornell University Press. ISBN 9780801497643.
- Snyder, Jack (1984). The Ideology of the Offensive: Military Decision Making and the Disasters of 1914. Ithaca: Cornell University Press. ISBN 9780801482441.

==== Edited volumes ====
- Snyder, Jack; Vinjamuri, Leslie; Hopgood, Stephen, eds. (2017). Human Rights Futures. Cambridge, UK: Cambridge University Press. ISBN 9781107193352.
- Snyder, Jack; Mingst, Karen, eds. (2016). Essential Readings in World Politics (6th ed.). New York: W.W. Norton. ISBN 9780393283662.
- Snyder, Jack; Cooley, Alexander, eds. (2015). Ranking the World: Grading States as a Tool of Global Governance. Cambridge University Press.
- Snyder, Jack, ed. (2011). Religion and International Relations Theory. New York: Columbia University Press. ISBN 9780231153386.
- Snyder, Jack; Walter, Barbara, eds. (1999). Civil Wars, Insecurity, and Intervention. New York: Columbia University. ISBN 9780231116275.
- Snyder, Jack; Rubin, Barnett, eds. (1998). Post-Soviet Political Order: Conflict and State-Building. London: Routledge. ISBN 9780415170680.
- Snyder, Jack; Jervis, Robert, eds. (1993). Coping with Complexity in the International System. Boulder, Colorado: Westview. ISBN 9780813386072.
- Snyder, Jack; Jervis, Robert, eds. (1991). Dominoes and Bandwagons: Strategic Beliefs and Great Power Competition in the Eurasian Rimland. New York: Oxford University Press. ISBN 9780195062465.

=== Selected journal articles and chapters ===
- Snyder, Jack; Mansfield, Edward (July 2007). "The Sequencing "Fallacy"". Journal of Democracy. 18 (3): 5–10. doi:10.1353/jod.2007.0047. S2CID 153352477.
- Snyder, Jack; Vinjamuri, Leslie (Winter 2003–04). "Trials and Errors: Principle and Pragmatism in Strategies of International Justice". International Security. 28 (3): 5–44. doi:10.1162/016228803773100066. S2CID 57564808.
- Snyder, Jack; Mansfield, Edward (Spring 2002). "Democratic Transitions, Institutional Strength, and War" (PDF). International Organization. 56 (2): 297–337. doi:10.1162/002081802320005496. S2CID 55323505. Archived from the original (PDF) on 2017-08-09.
- Snyder, Jack; Ballentine, Karen (Fall 1996). "Nationalism and the Marketplace of Ideas". International Security. 21 (2): 5–40. doi:10.1162/isec.21.2.5. S2CID 57559503.
- Snyder, Jack; Mansfield, Edward (Summer 1995). "Democratization and the Danger of War" (PDF). International Security. 20 (1): 5–38. doi:10.2307/2539213. JSTOR 2539213. S2CID 201794304.
- Snyder, Jack (1993). "Nationalism and the crisis of the post‐Soviet state". Survival: Global Politics and Strategy. 35 (1): 5–26. doi:10.1080/00396339308442671.
- Snyder, Jack; Christensen, Thomas J. (Spring 1990). "Chain gangs and passed bucks: predicting alliance patterns in multipolarity". International Organization. 44 (2): 137–168. doi:10.1017/S0020818300035232. S2CID 18700052.
- Snyder, Jack (Spring 1990). "Averting Anarchy in the New Europe". International Security. 14 (4): 5–41. doi:10.2307/2538749. JSTOR 2538749.
- Snyder, Jack (September 1977). "The Soviet Strategic Culture. Implications for Limited Nuclear Operations" (Interim report, PDF). RAND Corporation.

=== Other works ===
- Snyder, Jack; Vinjamuri, Leslie (May 12, 2014). "To Prevent Atrocities, Count on Politics First, Law Later". openDemocracy.
- Snyder, Jack (April 14, 2014). "On a Wing and a Prayer: Can Religion Revive the Human Rights Movement?". openDemocracy.
- Snyder, Jack (June 19, 2013). "Human Rights in the Vernacular". openDemocracy.
- Snyder, Jack; Cooley, Alexander (Nov–Dec 2015). "Rank Has Its Privileges: How International Ratings Dumb Down Global Governance". Foreign Affairs. Vol. 94, no. 6.
- Snyder, Jack (Nov–Dec 2004). "One World, Rival Theories". Foreign Policy. No. 145. pp. 52–62.
- Snyder, Jack; Mansfield, Edward (May–June 1995). "Democratization and War". Foreign Affairs. Vol. 74, no. 3.
