= Offensive realism =

Structural theory of international relations

Offensive realism is a structural theory in international relations which belongs to the neorealist school of thought and was put forward by the political scholar John Mearsheimer in response to defensive realism. Offensive realism holds that the anarchic nature of the international system is responsible for the promotion of aggressive state behavior in international politics. The theory fundamentally differs from defensive realism by depicting great powers as power-maximizing revisionists privileging buck-passing and self-promotion over balancing strategies in their consistent aim to dominate the international system. The theory provides important alternative views and understanding as well as often-accurate prediction of behaviors of individual states, but it remains a subject of criticism.

== Theoretical origins ==
Offensive realism is a prominent and important theory of international relations belonging to the realist school of thought, which includes various sub-trends characterised by the different perspectives of representative scholars such as Robert Gilpin, Eric J. Labs, Dylan Motin, Sebastian Rosato, Randall Schweller and Fareed Zakaria. Yet, to date, the most important variant of offensive neorealism, developed after Kenneth Waltz's defensive neorealism, is that of John J. Mearsheimer as fully developed in his 2001 book The Tragedy of Great Power Politics.

While Mearsheimer's offensive neorealism theory does reiterate and build on certain assumptions elaborated by classical realists, it departs completely from this branch by using positivism as a philosophy of science and by adding a system-centric approach to the study of state behavior in International Relations based on the structure of the international system. Accordingly, his offensive neorealism pertains to the sub-branch of neorealism alongside other structural theories such as defensive realism.

== Main tenets ==
The theory is grounded on five central assumptions similar to the ones that lie at the core of Kenneth Waltz's defensive neorealism. These are:

1. Great powers are the main actors in world politics and the international system is anarchical;
2. All states possess some offensive military capability;
3. States can never be certain of the intentions of other states;
4. States have survival as their primary goal;
5. States are rational actors, capable of coming up with sound strategies that maximize their prospects for survival.

Like defensive neorealism, offensive realism posits an anarchic international system in which rational great powers uncertain of other states' intentions and capable of military offensive strive to survive. Although initially developed from similar propositions to those of defensive neorealism, Mearsheimer's offensive neorealism advances drastically different predictions regarding great power behavior in international politics.

Mainly, it diverges from defensive neorealism in regards to the accumulation of power a state needs to possess to ensure its security and the issuing of strategy states pursue to meet this satisfactory level of security. Ultimately, Mearsheimer's offensive neorealism draws a much more pessimistic picture of international politics characterized by dangerous inter-state security competition likely leading to conflict and war.

=== Status quo v. power-maximizing states ===
John Mearsheimer's offensive neorealism intends to fix the "status quo bias" of Kenneth Waltz's defensive neorealism. While both neorealist variants argue that states are primarily concerned with maximizing their security, they disagree over the amount of power required in the process. To the contrary of defensive neorealism according to which states are status quo powers seeking only to preserve their respective positions in the international system by maintaining the prevailing balance of power, offensive neorealism claims that states are in fact power-maximizing revisionists harboring aggressive intentions. Indeed, in offensive neorealism, the international system provides great powers with strong incentives to resort to offensive action in order to increase their security and assure their survival.

The international system characterized by anarchy (the absence of a central authority capable of enforcing rules and punishing aggressors) and uncertainty as to state intentions and available offensive military capabilities leads states to constantly fear each other and resort to self-help mechanisms to provide for their survival. In order to alleviate this fear of aggression each holds of the other, states always seek to maximize their own relative power, defined in terms of material capabilities. As Mearsheimer puts it: "they look for opportunities to alter the balance of power by acquiring additional increments of power at the expense of potential rivals", since "the greater the military advantage one state has over other states, the more secure it is". States seek to increase their military strength to the detriment of other states within the system with hegemony—being the only great power in the state system—as their ultimate goal.

John Mearsheimer summed up this view as follows: "great powers recognize that the best way to ensure their security is to achieve hegemony now, thus eliminating any possibility of a challenge by another great power. Only a misguided state would pass up an opportunity to be the hegemon in the system because it thought it already had sufficient power to survive." Accordingly, offensive neorealists such as Mearsheimer believe that a state's best strategy to increase its relative power to the point of achieving hegemony is to rely on offensive tactics. Provided that it is rational for them to act aggressively, great powers will likely pursue expansionist policies, which will bring them closer to hegemony.

Since global hegemony is nearly impossible to attain due to the constraints of power projection across oceans and retaliation forces, the best end game status states can hope to reach is that of a regional hegemon dominating its own geographical area. This relentless quest for power inherently generates a state of "constant security competition, with the possibility of war always in the background". Only once regional hegemony is attained do great powers become status quo states.

=== Balancing v. buck-passing ===
The emphasis offensive neorealism puts on hegemony as states' end aim stands in sharp contrast to defensive neorealism's belief that state survival can be guaranteed at some point well short of hegemony. In a defensive neorealist mindset, security increments by power accumulation end up experiencing diminishing marginal returns where costs eventually outweigh benefits. Defensive neorealism posits that under anarchy there is a strong propensity for states to engage in balancing—states shouldering direct responsibility to maintain the existing balance of power—against threatening power-seeking states, which may in turn succeed in "jeopardiz[ing] the very survival of the maximizing state". This argument also applies to state behavior towards the most powerful state in the international system, as defensive neorealists note that an excessive concentration of power is self-defeating, triggering balancing countermoves.

Mearsheimer challenges these claims by making the argument that it is rather difficult to estimate when states have reached a satisfactory amount of power short of hegemony and costly to rely extensively on balancing as an efficient power-checking method due to collective action issues. According to him, when a great power finds itself in a defensive posture trying to prevent rivals from gaining power at its expense, it can choose to engage in balancing or intervene by favoring buck-passing—transferring the responsibility to act onto other states while remaining on the sidelines.

In order to determine the circumstances in which great powers behave according to one or the other, Mearsheimer builds on Waltz's defensive neorealism by including a second variable—geography—alongside the distribution of power. On one hand, the choice between balancing and buck-passing depends on whether the anarchic international system is of a bipolar, balanced, or unbalanced multipolar architecture. On another hand, state geographic location in terms of border sharing and stopping power of water also influences great powers' strategy preference. Combined, these two variables allow him to establish that great powers tend to favor—to the contrary of defensive neorealism predictions—buck-passing over balancing in all instances of multipolarity except for those that include a potential hegemon.

Responding to defensive neorealists' posture on state behavior towards the most powerful state in the international system, Mearsheimer believes that threatened states will reluctantly engage in balancing against potential hegemons but that balancing coalitions are unlikely to form against a great power that has achieved regional hegemony. This lack of balancing is best explained by the regional hegemon's newly acquired status quo stance, which follows from the geographical constraints on its power projection capability. Instead of relying on offensive actions, a regional hegemon finds itself in a defensive position seeking to avert threats to its hegemonic status by preventing the rise of any peer competitors in other areas. As such it will behave as an offshore balancer, passing the buck to local neighbors of the potential hegemon and engaging in balancing only as a last resort.

== Contributions and criticism ==
Mearsheimer's offensive neorealism represents an important contribution to international relations theory yet also generated important criticism. While the inputs and critics below provide a good sample of the theory's contributions and the kind of arguments that have been addressed against it, the listing should in no case be considered as exhaustive.

=== Theoretical inputs ===
Firstly, some scholars believe that Mearsheimer's offensive neorealism provides an alternative complement to Waltz's defensive neorealism. The theory adds to defensive neorealists' argument that the structure of the international system constrains state behaviour. Setting to rectify the status quo bias pertaining to defensive neorealism by arguing that anarchy can also generate incentives for states to maximize their share of power, offensive neorealism solves some anomalies that Waltz's theory fails to explain. Mainly, the theory is able to provide an explanation for the amount of conflict occurring among states in the international system. As Snyder states, Mearsheimer's offensive neorealism "enlarges the scope of neorealist theory by providing a theoretical rationale for the behaviour of revisionist states".

Moreover, this complementarity could signify theoretical interrelation with the two theories working in alternation to explain state behaviour, thereby allowing for a "more complete structural realist theory that can more accurately account for both defensive and offensive state behaviour". Secondly, these scholars uphold the argument that Mearsheimer's offensive neorealism significantly contributes to foreign policy theory and alliance theory. More specifically, Mearsheimer's theory goes a step further than structural defensive realism by successfully theorising both international politics and foreign policy.

Contrary to Waltz's rejection of defensive neorealism as a theory capable of explaining foreign policy on top of international politics, offensive neorealism includes explanations of both international outcomes pertaining to the systemic level of analysis and individual state behaviour. Additionally, the inclusion of new variables such as geography alongside the distribution of power enhances offensive neorealism's potential to make specific assumptions about states' pursuit of aggressive actions and resort to balancing and buck-passing.

=== Theoretical flaws ===
Some scholars have pointed out logical issues with Mearsheimer's offensive neorealism. Snyder rejects Mearsheimer's view of the security dilemma as "a synoptic statement of offensive realism". He argues that offensive neorealism's positing of all states as revisionists removes the central proposition—uncertainty about other states' intentions—on which the whole concept of security dilemma is grounded. Aggressive great powers' measures to maximize their security threaten others which leads to an actual justified security competition between states rather than an unnecessary one based on hypothetical threats.

Peter Toft argues that there are flaws in offensive neorealism's level of analysis. According to him, the inclusion of the non-structural geography variable to explain great power behaviour shifts the theory's focal point of analysis from system-wide dynamics to regional ones. Considering the theory's regional security analyses, he further argues that offensive neorealism fails to clearly define what constitutes a region with "entities like Europe or North-East Asia (taken) for granted", leaving room for scholarly disapproval.

Christopher Layne further highlights problems associated with the geographic variable. He criticizes Mearsheimer's reasoning according to which the "stopping power of water" prevents a great power from achieving global hegemony as this constraint does not seem to apply to the case of an emerging rival's capacity to exercise influence beyond its own neighbourhood. As Layne states, "apparently water stops the United States from imposing its powers on others in distant regions, but it does not stop them from threatening American primacy in the Western Hemisphere". Moreover, he finds offensive realism's classification of regional hegemons as status quo powers difficult to reconcile with the theory's emphasis on great powers as relentless power-maximizers. In this sense, Layne questions the ability of the water constraint to transform a power-maximizing state into a status quo power and contradicts Mearsheimer by arguing that a regional hegemon remains subjected to the quest for security, thereby striving to attain global hegemony.

A second group of criticisms addresses the issue of offensive neorealism's restrictive focuses. Mearsheimer's theory has been criticised for failing to take into account domestic politics. No attention is paid to a rising power's internal political functioning, its economy or society, which play a role in a state's decision-making process, in turn influencing its behaviour in international politics. Moreover, Snyder argues that no consideration is given to transnational threats such as terrorism, and that Mearsheimer's emphasis on security makes him ignore states' non-security interests such as ideology, national unification and human rights as an essential aspect of international politics alongside power competition.

Additionally, Toft points out that Mearsheimer's concentration on military capabilities and issuing state capacity for territorial conquest "implies a risk that his analyses miss a host of other ways of gaining and exercising influence". Similarly, political scientists whose primary focus is bargaining models of international conflict note that offensive neorealism ignores the fact that war is costly.

Since those costs in turn make war inefficient, states (even those who do not have hegemony) have incentive to construct bargained settlements. For instance, in a bipolar world with a 70%-to-30% power breakdown, states would prefer an analogously proportioned breakdown in resources rather than having some of those resources destroyed over the course of fighting. Due to this inefficiency—war's inefficiency puzzle—the constant fighting Mearsheimer proposes would actually make states less secure because the repeated costs of fighting eventually deplete all of that state's power.

Most importantly, there have been questions about the theory's empirical validity and prediction ability, which in turn can negatively affect the validity of offensive neorealism's prescriptions for state behaviour in international politics. In addition to mentioning the theory's failure to account for Japan's 20th century territorial acquisitions, NATO's continuation or Germany's non-achievement of regional hegemony in the post-Cold war era, critics have also expressed serious doubts regarding offensive neorealist views on China's rising power and U.S. regional hegemony. According to them, there is no reason to believe that China as a rational power which wants to ensure its survival will seek hegemony rather than rely on cooperative mechanisms. They similarly contradict Mearsheimer's arguments regarding the United States. Firstly, weak opposition or balancing inefficiencies rather than geographical constraints are taken as explanations for the uniqueness of the United States' regional hegemonic position.

Toft and Layne go a step further by asserting that Mearsheimer misjudges the United States as a regional hegemon engaged in offshore balancing. Instead of being a regional hegemon with the strategic aim of dominating the Western hemisphere while preventing the rise of peer competitors in Europe and Northeast Asia, these scholars believe that empirical data points to the fact that the United States has sought and achieved global hegemony, which in turn biases Mearsheimer's predictions regarding future U.S. strategic behavior, mainly in terms of its military involvement overseas.

== See also ==
- John Mearsheimer bibliography
- Lesser of two evils principle
- Cult of the offensive
