= Kenneth Waltz =

American political scientist (1924–2013)

Kenneth Neal Waltz
- Born: June 8, 1924; Ann Arbor, Michigan, U.S.
- Died: May 12, 2013 (aged 88); New York City, New York, U.S.

Education
- Education: Oberlin College (BA); Columbia University (MA, PhD)
- Thesis: Man, the State, and War: A Theoretical Analysis (1954)
- Academic advisor: William T. R. Fox

Philosophical work
- Era: Contemporary philosophy
- Region: Western Philosophy
- School: Neorealism
- Institutions: University of California, Berkeley; Columbia University
- Main interests: International security, nuclear security, anarchy
- Notable ideas: Structural realism, defensive realism
- Military career
- Allegiance: United States
- Branch: United States Army
- Service years: 1944 – 1946
- Rank: First lieutenant
- Conflicts: World War II; Occupation of Japan

Kenneth Neal Waltz (/wɔːlts/; June 8, 1924 – May 12, 2013) was an American political scientist who was a member of the faculty at both the University of California, Berkeley, and Columbia University and one of the most prominent scholars in the field of international relations. He was a veteran of both World War II and the Korean War.

Waltz was one of the original founders of neorealism, or structural realism, in international relations theory and later became associated with the school of defensive neorealism. Waltz's theories have been extensively debated within the field of international relations. His 1979 book Theory of International Politics is the most assigned book in International Relations graduate training at U.S. universities.

== Early life, education, and military service ==
Waltz was born on June 8, 1924, in Ann Arbor, Michigan, where he grew up and attended high school. He then enrolled at Oberlin College in Ohio, where he initially majored in mathematics. His college studies were interrupted by service in the United States Army from 1944 to 1946 during World War II. Waltz served in the Pacific theater of the war, rising in rank from private to 1st lieutenant, and was stationed in Japan during the U.S. occupation.

He graduated from Oberlin with an A.B. degree in 1948, having switched his major to economics. He was a Phi Beta Kappa and also named an Amos Miller Scholar.

In 1949, he married Helen Elizabeth Lindsley, known as "Huddie". They had three children together. After attending Columbia University to obtain an upper graduate degree in economics, he switched to political science because political philosophy was more interesting to him. He received his M.A. degree from there in 1950. He was an instructor at Oberlin for a while in 1950. A member of the US Army Reserve, he was called upon to serve again during the Korean War, which he did during 1951–1952 as a first lieutenant.

Returning to Columbia, he obtained his Ph.D. under William T. R. Fox in 1954. During his PhD studies, Waltz was most interested in political theory, but gravitated towards international relations due to the academic job market and the pressure of his dissertation advisor. While preparing for his comprehensive exams, Waltz came up with the ideas that would ultimately become his dissertation and his 1959 book Man, the State and War.

== Academic career ==
Waltz became a lecturer and then assistant professor at Columbia from 1953 to 1957. He became one of the early group of scholars at Columbia's Institute of War and Peace Studies and acted as a research assistant from 1952 to 1954 and a research associate from 1954. Later saying that he and his wife had been unsettled by the prospect of raising small children in New York City, Waltz left Columbia for Swarthmore College, where he was an assistant professor and then a professor from 1957 to 1966. From 1966 to 1971, he moved on to Brandeis University , the last four years of which he held the Adlai E. Stevenson Professor of International Politics chair.

In 1971, Waltz joined University of California, Berkeley, where he was appointed the Ford Professor of Political Science. Meanwhile, Waltz held a number of additional research positions. He was affiliated with the Institute of War and Peace Studies until 1964. He was a fellow of Columbia University in Political Theory and International Relations from 1959 to 1960 in London. He was a research associate at Center for International Affairs at Harvard University in 1963 to 1964, 1968, 1969, and 1972. He held a National Science Foundation grant from 1968 to 1971 to develop a theory of international politics.

He was a Guggenheim Fellow for 1976 to 1977, and a fellow at the Institute for the Study of World Politics in 1977. He was a fellow at the Woodrow Wilson International Center for Scholars in 1979–1980. He then became a research associate with the Department of War Studies, King's College London. Waltz taught at Peking University for two months in 1982, and later taught at Fudan University.

He lectured at a number of institutions in the US, including the Air Force Academy, the National War College, the Army War College, and the Naval War College. Similarly, he lectured at many other institutions around the world, including the London School of Economics, the Australian National University, and the University of Bologna. Waltz served as an instructor at MIT Seminar XXI.

In 1997, Waltz retired from his position at Berkeley and returned to Columbia University. There, he became an adjunct professor and a senior research scholar at the Institute of War and Peace Studies.

Waltz served as Secretary of the American Political Science Association in 1966 to 1967 and then as its president in 1987 to 1988. He was President of the New England Section of the International Studies Association in 1966 to 1967. He was a Fellow of the American Academy of Arts and Sciences and served stints on the boards of editors of several scholarly journals. He has described Hans Morgenthau as a strong influence upon his work.

=== Levels of analysis ===
Waltz's initial contribution to the field of international relations was his influential 1959 book, Man, the State, and War. It classified theories of the causes of war into three categories, or levels of analysis. He referred to those levels of analysis as "images" and used the writings of one or more classic political philosophers to outline the major points of each image. Each image was given two chapters: the first used the classical philosopher's writings mainly to describe what that image says about the cause of war, and the second usually had Waltz analyze the strengths and weaknesses of that image. Waltz's wife was essential in contributing the research that became the basis for the book.

The first image argued that wars are often caused by the nature of particular statesmen and political leaders such as state leaders, like Napoleon, or by human nature more generally. That is basically consistent with classical realism, which then dominated the international relations discipline, but Waltz would contest it more fully in his next book, Theory of International Politics.

Theories of war that fall under the rubric of Waltz's second image contended that wars are caused by the domestic makeup of states. A prime example that Waltz referred to is Lenin's theory of imperialism, which posits that the main cause of war is rooted in the need for capitalist states to continue opening up new markets in order to perpetuate their economic system at home. Today, a more familiar example in the Western world is the notion that nondemocratic states, because of their internal composition, start wars.

Waltz next assessed the first two images as being less influential in general than the third image but as ultimately necessary in understanding the causes of war. The third image posits that the cause of war is found at the systemic level and the anarchic structure of the international system is the root cause of war. In that context, "anarchy" was defined not as a condition of chaos or disorder but one in which no sovereign body governs the interactions between autonomous nation-states. In other words, in domestic society, citizens can theoretically rely on law enforcement agencies to protect their persons and property, but if a state is invaded and calls "9-1-1," it cannot be sure that anyone will answer.

Similarly, when two citizens have a dispute, they can appeal to the courts to render a verdict and, more importantly, the law enforcement agencies to enforce the court's ruling. However, there is no body above nation-states that can establish rules or laws for all the states, decide how they apply in specific cases, and compel the states to honor the court's ruling. As a result, if an issue at stake is important enough to a state, it can achieve a satisfactory outcome only by using its power to impose its will on another state(s). The realization that any state can resort to armed force anytime forces each state to be always prepared for that contingency.

Those themes were fleshed out more fully in Theory of International Politics, which, as the title suggests, explained a theory for international politics as a whole, rather than the narrower focus on what causes war.

=== Neorealism ===
Waltz's key contribution to the realm of political science is in the creation of neorealism (or structural realism, as he calls it), a theory of international relations that posits that the interaction of sovereign states can be explained by the pressures exerted on them by the anarchic structure of the international system, which limits and constrains their choices. Neorealism thus aims to explain recurring patterns in international relations, such as why relations between Sparta and Athens resembled those between the United States and the Soviet Union in some important ways.

Waltz emphasizes repeatedly in the book and elsewhere that he is not creating a theory of foreign policy, which aims to explain the behavior or actions of a particular state at a specific time or throughout a period. For Waltz, neorealism is divided into two branches: defensive and offensive neorealism. Although both branches agree that the structure of the system is what causes states to compete for power, defensive realism posits that most states seek a status quo and limit themselves to concentrate on maintaining the balance of power. Revisionist states are said to be the only states that seek to alter the balance. Offensive neorealism, in contrast to Waltz, asserts that nations seek local hegemony over neighboring states to assert authority in local relations with rival states.

Waltz argues that contemporary geopolitics exists in a state of international affairs comparable to that of perpetual international anarchy. He distinguishes the anarchy of the international environment from the order of the domestic one. In the domestic realm, all actors may appeal to and be compelled by a central authority, "the state" or "the government," but in the international realm, no such source of order exists. The anarchy of international politics, with its lack of a central enforcer, means that states must act in a way that ensures their security above all, or they otherwise risk falling behind.

Waltz wrote that this international anarchy is a fundamental fact of political life faced by democracies and dictatorships alike. Except in rare cases, they cannot count on the good will of others to help them and so they must always be ready to fend for themselves. Waltz's usage of the term "anarchy" led to a fundamental discursive transformation in international relations, as scholars wrestled with Waltz's ideas. A 2015 study by Jack Donnelly found that the term "anarchy" occurred on average 6.9 times in international relations books prior to 1979 but 35.5 times in those afterward.

Like most other neorealists, Waltz accepted that globalization poses new challenges to states, but he did not believe that states are being replaced because no other non-state actor can equal the capabilities of the state. Waltz suggested that globalization is a fad of the 1990s, and if anything, the role of the state has expanded its functions in response to global transformations.

Neorealism was Waltz's response to what he saw as the deficiencies of classical realism. Although both terms are sometimes used interchangeably, neorealism and realism have a number of fundamental differences. The main distinction between the two theories is that classical realism puts human nature, or the urge to dominate, at the center of its explanation for war, but neorealism stakes a reduced claim on human nature and argues instead that the pressures of anarchy tend to shape outcomes more directly than the human nature of statesmen and diplomats or domestic governmental preferences.

Waltz's theory, as he explicitly states in Theory of International Politics, is not a theory of foreign policy and does not attempt to predict specific state actions, such as the collapse of the Soviet Union. The theory explains only general principles of behavior that govern relations between states in an anarchic international system, rather than specific actions. The recurring principles of behavior include balancing of power (the theory was refined by Stephen Walt, who modified the "balance of power" concept to "balance of threat"), entering individually-competitive arms races, and exercising restraint in proportion to relative power. In Theory of International Politics Waltz suggested that explanation, rather than prediction, is expected from a good social science theory since social scientists cannot run the controlled experiments that give the natural sciences so much predictive power.

As a teacher, Waltz trained numerous prominent international relations scholars, including Stephen Walt, Barry Posen, Stephen Van Evera, Bob Powell, Avery Goldstein, Christopher Layne, Benny Miller, Karen Adams, Shibley Telhami, James Fearon, William Rose, Robert Gallucci, and Andrew Hanami. He influenced Robert Jervis and Robert Art.

Columbia University colleague Robert Jervis has said of Waltz, "Almost everything he has written challenges the consensus that prevailed at the time" and "Even when you disagree, he moves your thinking ahead." Leslie H. Gelb has considered Waltz one of the "giants" who helped define the field of international relations as an academic discipline.

=== Nuclear proliferation ===
While he only gave passing mention to nuclear proliferation in Theory of International Politics, Waltz put forth arguments in later work that nuclear proliferation would reduce the likelihood and severity of conflict. He argued that nuclear proliferation was desirable.

== Bibliography ==
- Man, the State, and War. Columbia University Press. New York: 1959.
- Foreign Policy and Democratic Politics: The American and British Experience. Little, Brown and Company. New York: 1967.
- Theory of International Politics. Waveland Press. Long Grove, IL: 1979 (reissued 2010).
- The Use of Force: Military Power and International Politics. University Press of America. New York: 1983. (coauthored with Robert Art).
- Reflections on Theory of International Politics. A Response to My Critics, in: Keohane, Robert: Neorealism and Its Critics. 1986.
- The Spread of Nuclear Weapons: A Debate Renewed. W. W. Norton & Company. New York: 1995.
- Realism and International Politics. Routledge. 2008.
- Paul R Viotti, Kenneth Waltz: An Intellectual Biography. New York: Columbia University Press, 2024.

=== Review ===
- In Man, the State, and War, Waltz proposes a three-images view of looking at international relations behavior. The first image was the individual and human nature; the second image the nation-state, and the third image the international system.
- In Theory of International Politics, Waltz elaborates many of the core principles of neorealist international relations theory, adopting a structural perspective that sets him apart from earlier (classical) realists like E.H. Carr and Hans Morgenthau, and later giving rise to the Neoclassical realist movement (Randall Schweller, Fareed Zakaria, William C. Wohlforth, Thomas J. Christensen, etc.) which tries to incorporate a structural component while emphasizing the state-society relationship that mitigates structural forces. (This book also popularized the term bandwagoning.)
- In The Spread of Nuclear Weapons: A Debate Renewed, Waltz argues for the virtues of a world with more nuclear weapon states because of their power in nuclear deterrence. Sagan argued against the proliferation of nuclear weapons. See nuclear peace.

== Awards and honors ==
Waltz received the Heinz Eulau Award in 1991 for Best Article in the American Political Science Review during 1990 for "Nuclear Myths and Political Realities". He received the James Madison Award for "distinguished scholarly contributions to political science" from the American Political Science Association in 1999. The International Studies Association in 2010 named him their International Security Studies Section Distinguished Scholar.

In 2008, a conference in Waltz's honor was conducted by Aberystwyth University, titled "The King of Thought: Theory, the Subject and Waltz". It celebrated the 50th anniversary of the publication of Man, the State, and War and the 30th anniversary of Theory of International Politics.

Waltz received honorary doctorates from Copenhagen University, Oberlin College, Nankai University, and Aberystwyth University, as well as from the University of Macedonia (Greece).

== Dissertation Award ==
The Kenneth N. Waltz Dissertation Award is a yearly award given by the American Political Science Association to the best defended dissertation on the study of international security and arms control. Students from around the country are allowed to submit their paper to the committee, which has four members. The committee accepts any style, whether its historical, quantitative, theoretical, policy analysis, etc.

== See also ==
=== Classical realists ===
- Thucydides
- Niccolò Machiavelli
- Thomas Hobbes
- George F. Kennan
- Hans Morgenthau
- Reinhold Niebuhr
- E. H. Carr

=== Neorealists ===
- Joseph Grieco
- Stephen D. Krasner
- John J. Mearsheimer
- Stephen Walt
- Robert J. Art
- Stephen Van Evera
- Dale Copeland

=== Neoclassical realists ===
- Randall Schweller
- William Wohlforth

=== Issues and theory ===
- International relations
- Neorealism (international relations)
- Nuclear deterrence
- Nuclear optimism
- Nuclear proliferation
