= Defensive realism =

Structural theory of international relations

Defensive neorealism is a structural theory in international relations which is derived from the school of neorealism. The theory finds its foundation in the political scientist Kenneth Waltz's Theory of International Politics in which Waltz argues that the anarchical structure of the international system encourages states to maintain moderate and reserved policies to attain national security. In contrast, offensive realism assumes that states seek to maximize their power and influence to achieve security through domination and hegemony. Defensive neorealism asserts that aggressive expansion as promoted by offensive neorealists upsets the tendency of states to conform to the balance of power theory, thereby decreasing the primary objective of the state, which they argue to be the ensuring of its security. Defensive realism denies neither the reality of interstate conflict or that incentives for state expansion exist, but it contends that those incentives are sporadic, rather than endemic. Defensive neorealism points towards "structural modifiers," such as the security dilemma and geography, and elite beliefs and perceptions to explain the outbreak of conflict.

== Theoretical origins ==
Defensive neorealism is a structural theory that is part of structural realism, also known as neorealism, which is a subset of the realist school of thought in International Relations theory. Neorealism therefore works from realism's five base theoretical assumptions as outlined by offensive neorealist scholar John J. Mearsheimer in "The False Promise of International Institutions". These assumptions are:

1. The international system is anarchic.
2. States inherently possess some offensive military capability, which gives them the ability to hurt and possibly destroy each other.
3. States can never be certain about the intentions of other states.
4. The basic motive driving states is survival.
5. States think strategically about how to survive in the international system.

These five assumptions drive neorealism's belief that state survival is attained through "self-help". However, neorealism departs from classical realism's other main assumption that it is the flaws and complexities of human nature that drive the international system. Instead, neorealists assert that the anarchy inherent to the structure of the international system is the driving force of international politics. It is on these key neorealist assumptions that defensive and offensive neorealists base their competing understandings of state behavioural patterns.

== Main tenets ==
=== Defensive neorealism ===
As Kenneth Waltz asserted in his seminal defensive neorealist text Theory of International Politics, defensive neorealists argue that the anarchic nature of the international system encourages states to undertake defensive and moderate policies. They argue that states are not intrinsically aggressive and that "the first concern of states is not to maximize power but to maintain their position in the system". This is the crucial point of departure from offensive neorealism, which instead argues that anarchy encourages states to increase state power vigorously, as "the world is condemned to perpetual great power competition".

Defensive neorealists identify a number of problems regarding offensive neorealism's support of aggressive expansion of power. Building on Waltz's balance of power theory and the assumption that "balancing is more common than bandwagoning", defensive neorealists assert that states which strive to attain hegemony in the international system will be counterbalanced by other states seeking to maintain the status quo. While offensive realists believe states inherently desire either global hegemony or local hegemony, defensive neorealists argue that states are socialised and aware of historical precedent, which defensive neorealists assert, generally displays state aggression and expansion to fulfil the aim of hegemony as attracting resistance from other states. Aggression is therefore argued to be self-defeating in achieving the aim of security, which defensive neorealists posit to be the state's primary objective. Indeed, Jack Snyder asserts, "international anarchy punishes aggression; it does not reward it".

This assumption in turn, informs defensive neorealism's assertion that the benefits of conquest rarely outweigh its negatives. Defensive neorealists state that the problems conquest faces are diverse, existing both during the opening phases of expansion and during occupation. They contend that the subjugation of a state's population is risky and difficult, especially in the face of the modern concept of nationalism, which can provide an effective narrative of resistance if the state is conquered. This increases the already expensive process of occupation, especially in societies that rely on freedom of movement and transportation for economic prosperity because these are vulnerable to sabotage and embargo. In addition, newly acquired infrastructure must be protected and rebuilt when destroyed, the defence of new borders must be consolidated, and the possible resistance of local workers to contributing skilled labour to the new authorities, all combine to place heavy strain on the economic and production capabilities of the conquering state. In contrast to offensive neorealists, defensive neorealists assert that these strains outweigh the economic benefits states can attain from conquered territory, resources and infrastructure.

=== Individual security and state security ===
Defensive neorealists also point to the disconnect between individual security and state security, which they believe offensive neorealists conflate. Defensive neorealists assert that "states are not as vulnerable as men are in a state of nature" and their destruction is a difficult and protracted task. They contend that states, especially major powers, can afford to wait for definitive evidence of attack rather than undertaking pre-emptive strikes or reacting inappropriately to inadvertent threats. This aspect is crucial. It allows the possibility of overcoming, or at least reducing, the impact of one of the prominent theories of neorealism: the security dilemma or spiral model.

Coined by John H. Herz in his 1951 work Political Realism and Political Idealism, defensive neorealists believe the security dilemma, as expanded by Robert Jervis in "Cooperation Under the Security Dilemma" in 1978, is defined by the assumption that the offense-defense balance tends to favour defensive capability over offensive capability. The outbreak of World War I and its subsequent hostilities is commonly used as an example in which states erroneously believed offensive capabilities to be superior to those of defense. Defensive neorealists argue that just as in World War I, offensive dominance tends to be unsupported by political reality and military reality and is in fact, only perceived. A key component of this view is that geography, offensive neorealists such as John Mearsheimer contend, usually inhibits the projection of power due to the natural barriers rivers, mountains, deserts, oceans, jungles, etc., present. These operational and logistical problems only increase as the area(s) of operations move further away from the aggressor.

In addition, defensive neorealists assert that the second-strike capability afforded by either a state's nuclear arsenal or that of its allies, inhibits the ability of the aggressor state to conquer another. This is used as evidence that defensive capabilities ultimately trump offensive ones, and that they encourages states to employ defensive and restrained policies. Indeed, Robert Jervis states that when the security dilemma is tipped in defense's favour "international anarchy [is] relatively unimportant" as "status-quo states can make themselves more secure without gravely endangering others".

This does not mean however, that defensive neorealists deny that opportunities for state expansion exist, nor that states should not exploit these opportunities as they are presented. As Stephen Van Evera argues in Causes of War: Power and the Roots of Conflict, sometimes states that wish to maintain the status quo must become the aggressor in order to prevent later aggression against themselves or their allies. This is especially relevant for states that lack protective geographical barriers, even if they employ policies that promote the status quo. Here, balancing behaviour is undertaken more abruptly, it is more likely to intimidate other states and offensive policies are more likely to be implemented. Defensive neorealists however, contend that a favourable offensive balance is the exception rather than the rule, and that unnecessary aggression and expansion is self-defeating and counterproductive.

=== Elite perceptions and beliefs ===
Defensive neorealists claim that elite perceptions and beliefs are key to the outbreak of conflict between states. Along with geography and the security dilemma, defensive neorealists believe these perceptions are a structural modifier, an anomaly that upsets the balance of power, rather than evidence of the fundamental offensive neorealist assumption that the anarchical structure of the international system encourages security through the increase of relative state power. These perceptions manifest in a number of ways and are often employed in an irregular way, which intimidates other states. They can lead elites to inflate threats in order to mobilise resources and promote expansion, or conversely, inhibit elites from recognising or rectifying their declining power in the international system due to domestic concerns being prioritised over international concerns.

Elite perceptions, especially when dominated by groups such as the military, which have joined with other groups espousing an expansionist ideology, can lead to a state's overexpansion. This occurs because the multiple groups dominate a very centralised system and each enacts its often differing aims. Effective restriction and balancing of expansion is therefore difficult or ignored. Despite vast territorial gains, they are not effectively consolidated, the population is not subjugated or enfolded into the state narrative, resources are not effectively exploited, and the rapid expansion becomes unsustainable. If the elites realise their mistake, it is incredibly difficult to rectify their grand strategy due to the narrative sold both to its own members and to the general public, effectively condemning the state to defeat. This is exemplified by the Japanese Empire's rapid expansion starting in the 1930s and its subsequent collapse.

== Criticism ==
Despite defensive realism's significant contribution to international relations theory and its number of prominent proponents, such as Kenneth Waltz, Stephen Van Evera, and Charles L. Glaser, it has been criticised both by offensive realists and other scholars. A major point of contention is the difficulty states face in accurately assessing the offense-defense balance. This is because of war's uncertainty and because at a more basic level, the military equipment used to wage war is inherently ambiguous. Equipment is neither solidly defensive nor offensive in nature and its ambiguity only increases as the equipment's sophistication and capability develops. This is further compounded when state policies, strategy and relations are considered. Depending on the political context and history between the state(s) assessing and the state(s) assessed, some pieces of military equipment could reasonably be determined to be for offensive or defensive use, regardless of the reality.

Defensive realism's critics assert that this entrenched ambiguity, even in the face of the realist assumption that states think rationally and strategically about how to survive, is too great a risk for states to chance. They assert that states will naturally assume the worst-case scenario to ensure their own security in the "self-help" environment, which realists assume dominates the anarchic international system. This view is summarised concisely by Stephen Walt: "If states cannot measure the offense-defense balance or distinguish between offensive and defensive capabilities, then security-seeking states cannot escape the security dilemma and cannot signal their peaceful intention in a convincing manner." Assuming the proposed dearth of clear signalling between states is as prevalent as defensive realism's critics would suggest, this clearly then, contests defensive realism's validity.

Building on the offense-defense ambiguity, it has also been suggested that it is impossible to accurately gauge when a state has attained a satisfactory level of relative power. This can combine with unfavourable structural modifiers such as geography to contradict the idea that states can afford to wait for definitive signs of attack.

One of defensive neorealism's main criticisms asserts that it is unable to theorise and make assumptions about the policies of specific states as offensive neorealism can.

John Mearsheimer has criticized arguments about the role of the offense-defense balance in the outbreak of war. Mearsheimer argues that the notion that wars start when offense has the advantage come "close to being circular." He also questions, "How can one recognize an offensive advantage?" Assessments of offensive advantage that emphasize "type of weapons" and "balance of forces" are not sufficient, because it is not easy to distinguish between weapons intended for offensive or defensive use and a superiority in military forces does not necessarily lead to victory in war.
