= Samuel Barkin =

Canadian political scientist and professor

J. Samuel Barkin (born 1965) is a Canadian political scientist and a professor of global governance and human security at the University of Massachusetts Boston.

== Academic career ==
After receiving his BA and MA from the University of Toronto, Barkin got his MPhil and PhD from Columbia University.

In a 2003 article published in International Studies Review, Barkin created an international relations theory called 'realist constructivism', which combined realism and constructivism, and argued that his new theory can "study the relationship between normative structures, the carriers of political morality, and uses of power" in ways existing approaches do not. In 2004, this journal launched a special issue to discuss this new theory.

== Publications ==
=== Monographs ===
- The Sovereignty Cartel (Cambridge University Press, 2021)
- International Organization: Theories and Institutions, 2nd edition (Palgrave, 2013)
- Realist Constructivism: Rethinking International Relations Theory (Cambridge University Press, 2010)
- Social Construction and the Logic of Money: Financial Predominance and International Economic Leadership (SUNY Press, 2003)

=== Co-authored books ===
- International Relations’ Last Synthesis? Decoupling Constructivisms and Critical Approaches, with Laura Sjoberg (Oxford University Press, 2019)
- Saving Global Fisheries: Reducing Capacity to Promote Sustainability, with Elizabeth DeSombre (MIT Press, 2013)
- Fish, with Elizabeth DeSombre (Polity Press, 2011)

=== Co-edited volumes ===
- Interpretive Quantification: Methodological Explorations for Critical and Constructivist IR, with Laura Sjoberg (University of Michigan Press, 2017)
- Anarchy and the Environment: The International Relations of Common Pool Resources, with George Shambaugh. (SUNY Press, 1999)
