= Cult of the offensive =

Strategic military dilemma

Map of the Schlieffen Plan and planned French counter-offensives

The cult of the offensive refers to a strategic military dilemma in which leaders believe that offensive advantages are so great a defending force would have no hope of repelling the attack and therefore choose to attack. It is most often used to explain the causes of World War I and the subsequent heavy losses that occurred year after year, on all sides, during the fighting on the Western Front.

The term has also been applied to pre-World War II air power doctrine that held that "the bomber will always get through" and the only way to end a bombing campaign was to bomb the enemy into submission.

== Military theory ==
Under the cult of offensive, military leaders believe that the attacker will be victorious (or at least cause more casualties than they receive) regardless of circumstance and so defense as a concept is almost completely discredited. This results in all strategies focusing on attacking, and the only valid defensive strategy being to counter-attack.

== International politics ==
In international relations, the cult of offensive is related to the security dilemma and offensive realism theories. It stresses that conquest is easy and security difficult to obtain from a defensive posture. Liberal institutionalists argue that it is a commitment problem and that a preemptive war that results from the security dilemma is fairly rare.

== World War I ==
The cult of the offensive was the dominant theory among many military and political leaders before World War I. Those leaders argued in favour of declaring war and launching an offensive, believing they could cripple their opponents, and fearing that if they waited, they in turn would be defeated. The dominance of this line of thought significantly contributed to the escalation of hostilities, and is seen as one of the causes of World War I.

Military theorists of the time generally held that seizing the offensive was of crucial importance, hence belligerents were encouraged to strike first in order to gain the advantage. Most planners wanted to begin mobilization as quickly as possible to avoid being caught on the defensive. This was complicated as mobilisations were expensive, and their timetables were so rigid that they could not be cancelled without massive disruption of the country and military disorganisation. Thus, the window for diplomacy was shortened by this attitude, and once the mobilisations had begun, diplomacy had the added difficulty of having to justify cancelling the mobilisations. This phenomenon was also referred to as "war by timetable".

The German Schlieffen Plan is a notable example of the cult of the offensive. Supported by offensively-minded officers such as Alfred von Schlieffen and Helmuth von Moltke the Younger, it was executed in the first month of the war (with some historians maintaining it was nearly victorious, though others claim the Plan never had any chance of success.) A French counter-attack on the outskirts of Paris, the Battle of the Marne and unexpectedly speedy Russian mobilisation and attacks, ended the German offensive and resulted in years of trench warfare. It was not only Germany who followed the cult of the offensive; the French army, among others, was also driven very strongly by this doctrine, where its supporters included Ferdinand Foch, Joseph Joffre and Loyzeaux de Grandmaison.

World War I was dominated by defensive firepower but the onus on the Entente was to conduct an offensive strategy, that caused mass casualties and mutual exhaustion. German armies prepared elaborate defensive positions on the western front with trenches, barbed wire and concrete strong-points backed by artillery, rifles and machine guns which until 1917, were sufficient to inflict mass losses on attacking infantry and restrict the Franco-British armies to minor gains in ground. Tactical development on the Western Front in 1917 began to return mobility to the battlefield and a form of semi-open warfare developed. Much inter-war military thinking was influenced by the cost of offensives fought for strategic reasons, in circumstances of defensive operational and tactical dominance. In World War II, the Western Allies from 1939–1940 avoided an offensive, intending to wait until Franco-British rearmament had matured and the blockade of Germany had undermined its war economy, then in 1941 or 1942, resume the firepower warfare of 1918.

Scott Sagan has challenged notions that the cult of the offensive was a fundamental cause of World War I. Sagan makes three arguments:

1. Those that attribute the causes of WWI to a cult of the offensive exaggerate the value of purely defensive doctrines. For example, favorable force ratios may have enabled offense to defeat defense. Additionally, the adoption of a defensive doctrine by France may have enabled Germany to more soundly and rapidly defeat Russia, thus making the Western front vulnerable in the long-run.
2. There is a hindsight bias in saying the offensive doctrines were fundamentally flawed. According to Sagan, the Schlieffen Plan was not unreasonable and came close to succeeding.
3. The political objectives of the great powers, such as maintaining alliance commitments, necessitated the adoption of offensive doctrines. For example, France needed an offensive doctrine to protect Russia from Germany, Russia needed one to protect Serbia from Austria-Hungary, and Germany needed one to protect Austria-Hungary from France.

Sagan argues that the underlying causes behind the offensive doctrines were the political objectives and alliance commitments of the great powers. Furthermore, he argues that if Britain had issued a credible threat to intervene in a continental war early in the July 1914 crisis, Berlin would have likely been deterred.
