= Stephen Van Evera =

American political scientist

- Born: November 10, 1948 (age 77)
- Education: UC Berkeley College of Letters and Science
- Scientific career
- Fields: Polticial science
- Workplaces: MIT School of Humanities, Arts, and Social Sciences

Stephen William Van Evera (born 10 November 1948) is a professor of Political Science at the Massachusetts Institute of Technology, specializing in international relations. His research includes U.S. foreign and national security policy as well as causes and prevention of war. He is a member of the Council on Foreign Relations.

== Biography ==
Van Evera received his A.B. in government from Harvard and his Ph.D. in political science from the University of California, Berkeley. During the 1980s he was managing editor of the journal International Security.

Van Evera is the author of Causes of War: Power and the Roots of Conflict (Cornell, 1999). He has also co edited Nuclear Diplomacy and Crisis Management (1990), Soviet Military Policy (1989), and The Star Wars Controversy (1986).

== Academic work ==
Van Evera is considered a defensive realist, which is a branch of structural realism.

=== Offense–defense theory ===
In Causes of War: Power and the Roots of Conflict, Van Evera proposed offense–defense theory, which attempts to discern what factors increase the likelihood of war. Van Evera states three main hypotheses:

1. War will be more common in periods when conquest is easy, or is believed to be easy, than in other periods.
2. States that have, or believe they have, large offensive opportunities or defensive vulnerabilities will initiate and fight more wars than other states.
3. Actual examples of true imbalances are rare and explain only a moderate amount of history.

However, false perceptions of these factors are common and thus explain a great deal of history. Van Evera wrote on these factors being causal in the outbreak of the World War I in a famous 1984 article. Although trench warfare and the development of the machine gun meant that defensive strategies should have prevailed, many European nations were under the illusion that conquest was easy or that they were valuable. This misconception resulted in a drawn-out and bloody conflict. Recent discussion in international relations theory questions the idea of explaining the outbreak of World War I in terms of a 'cult of the offensive': with evidence showing that war planners – German ones especially – before 1914 being well aware of the heavy casualties implicit in offensive operations.

=== Process-tracing tests for affirming causal inferences ===
In his 1997 book Guide to Methods for Students of Political Science, Van Evera authored an influential typology of process-tracing tests which distinguishes tests depending on how they adjudicate between theoretical expectations in qualitative research:

- Straw-in-the-wind tests: Failure or passage of this test neither lends strong support for or against the theory
- Hoop tests: Failure to pass a hoop test can be disqualifying for a theory but passing the hoop test does not necessarily lend strong support for the theory
- Smoking gun tests: Passing a smoking gun test lends strong support for theory, whereas failure does not necessarily lend strong support against the theory
- Double decisive tests: Passing a double decisive test lends strong support for the theory while also lending strong support against alternative theories

== Publications ==
=== Books ===
- Military Strategy and the Origins of the First World War, eds. (Princeton University Press, 1991)
- Guide to Methods for Students of Political Science (Cornell University Press, 1997)
- Causes of War: Power and the Roots of Conflict (Cornell University Press, 1999)

== See also ==
- Geoffrey Blainey
