= John H. Herz =

American legal academic (1908–2005)

- Born: Hans Hermann Herz; 23 September 1908; Düsseldorf, Prussia, German Empire
- Died: 26 December 2005 (aged 97); Scarsdale, New York, United States
- Parent(s): Carl Herz; Elizabeth

John H. Herz (born Hans Hermann Herz; 23 September 1908 – 26 December 2005) was an American scholar of international relations and law. He coined the concept of the security dilemma.

== Early life ==
He was born in Düsseldorf, German Empire to Carl and Elizabeth Aschaffenburg Herz. In 1931, Herz chose Hans Kelsen as his doctoral supervisor at the University of Cologne. In 1935, he fled Germany because he was Jewish and emigrated to Switzerland where he received a diploma from the Graduate Institute of International Studies in Geneva in 1938. In 1938, he emigrated to the United States.

== Academic career ==
In the United States, he found a temporary position at Princeton University through the assistance of Abraham Flexner. In 1940, he also worked at Trinity College (Connecticut). In 1941 Ralph Bunche, who headed the Political Science department at Howard University, hired Herz.

In 1942, Herz wrote that "Power competition among several units of a system eventually leads either to the predominance of one of them or to the establishment of a system where the political units balance each other, and thus can continue to exist side by side." Herz wrote that a "world government" was not utopian, but that the shift from a system of nation-states to one of world government would require "an ideological and spiritual revolution." After World War 2, he worked as a political analyst for the US State Department - he took part in the US delegation to the Nuremberg trials and also helped draw up a plan for democratizing the occupation zone in Germany.

In a 1950 article, Herz coined the concept of the security dilemma. While at Harvard University, Herz wrote Political Realism and Political Idealism, a book which the American Political Science Association awarded the Woodrow Wilson Prize in 1951. In the book, Herz criticizes "political idealism" for failing to grapple with the security dilemma. He crafts a theory of "Realist Liberalism." According to a 1952 review of the book, Herz's "approach to the problem of politics is... essentially psychological in character. Man, he thinks, is driven in his relations with other men by two contradictory impulses. Through fear of others he is impelled to seek security in a competitive struggle for power; through compassion for his fellow men, he regrets the sufferings thus entailed, and yearns for universal peace."

The following year, he joined City College of New York, where he taught International Relations until his retirement in 1979. Herz was one of a number of Jewish refugees from Germany who found positions in American universities and taught International Relations from a critical, Realist perspective. He wrote books and several influential articles.

He died in Scarsdale, New York on December 26, 2005, at the age of 97.

== Personal life ==
Herz married Anne Klein (d. 2003) in 1941. They had a son, Stephen, in 1946.

== See also ==
- Security dilemma, term coined by John Herz
