= Realism (international relations) =

Politics as self-interested competition

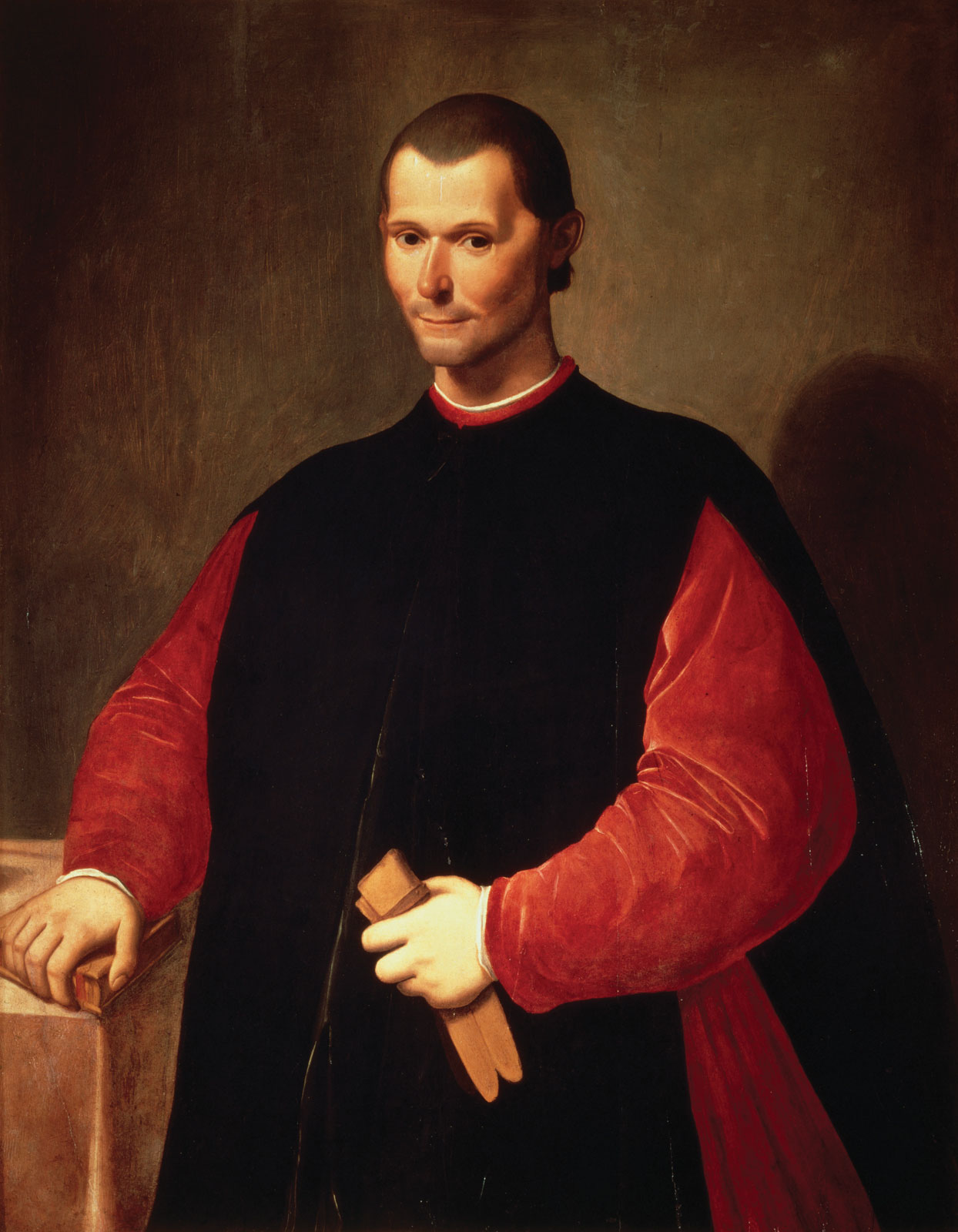
Niccolò Machiavelli's The Prince (1532) was a major stimulus to realist thinking.

Realism, in international relations theory, is a theoretical framework that views world politics as an enduring competition among self-interested states vying for power and positioning within an anarchic global system devoid of a centralized authority. It centers on states as rational primary actors navigating a system shaped by power politics, national interest, and a pursuit of security and self-preservation.

Realism involves the strategic use of military force and alliances to boost global influence while maintaining a balance of power. War is seen as inevitably inherent in the anarchic conditions of world politics. Realism also emphasizes the complex dynamics of the security dilemma, where actions taken for security reasons can unintentionally lead to tensions between states.

Unlike idealism or liberalism, realism underscores the competitive and conflictual nature of global politics. In contrast to liberalism, which champions cooperation, realism asserts that the dynamics of the international arena revolve around states actively advancing national interests and prioritizing security. While idealism leans towards cooperation and ethical considerations, realism argues that states operate in a realm devoid of inherent justice, where ethical norms may not apply.

Early popular proponents of realism included Thucydides (5th century BCE), Machiavelli (16th century), Hobbes (17th century), and Rousseau (18th century). Carl von Clausewitz (early 19th century), another contributor to the realist school of thought, viewed war as an act of statecraft and gave strong emphasis on hard power. Clausewitz felt that armed conflict was inherently one-sided, where typically only one victor can emerge between two parties, with no peace.

Realism became popular again in the 1930s, during the Great Depression. At that time, it polemicized with the progressive, reformist optimism associated with liberal internationalists like U.S. President Woodrow Wilson. The 20th century brand of classical realism, exemplified by theorists such as Reinhold Niebuhr and Hans Morgenthau, has evolved into neorealism—a more scientifically oriented approach to the study of international relations developed during the latter half of the Cold War. In the 21st century, realism has experienced a resurgence, fueled by escalating tensions among world powers. Some of the most influential proponents of political realism today are John Mearsheimer and Stephen Walt.

== Overview ==
Realists fall into three classes based on their view of the essential causes of conflict between states:

- Classical realists believe that conflict follows from human nature.
- Neorealists attribute conflict to the dynamics of the anarchic state-system.
- Neoclassical realists believe that conflict results from both, in combination with domestic politics. Neoclassical realists are also divided between defensive and offensive realism.

Realism entails a spectrum of ideas, which tend to revolve around several central propositions, such as:

1. State-centrism: states are the central actors in international politics, rather than leaders or international organizations;
2. Anarchy: the international political system is anarchic, as there is no supranational authority to enforce rules;
3. Rationality and/or egoism: states act in their rational self-interest within the international system; and
4. Power: states desire power to ensure self-preservation.

Political scientists sometimes associate realism with Realpolitik, as both deal with the pursuit, possession, and application of power. Realpolitik, however, is an older prescriptive guideline limited to policy-making, while realism is a wider theoretical and methodological paradigm which aims to describe, explain, and predict events in international relations. As an academic pursuit, realism is not necessarily tied to ideology; it does not favor any particular moral philosophy, nor does it consider ideology to be a major factor in the behavior of nations.

However, realists are generally critical of liberal foreign policy. Garrett Ward Sheldon has characterised the priorities of realists as Machiavellian and seen them as prioritising the seeking of power, although realists have also advocated the idea that powerful states concede spheres of influence to other powerful states.

== Common assumptions ==
The four propositions of realism are as follows.

1. State-centrism: States are the most important actors.
2. Anarchy: The international system is anarchic.
  - No actor exists above states, capable of regulating their interactions; states must arrive at relations with other states on their own, rather than it being dictated to them by some higher controlling entity.
  - The international system exists in a state of constant antagonism (anarchy).
3. Egoism: All states within the system pursue narrow self-interests.
  - States tend to pursue self-interest.
  - Groups strive to attain as many resources as possible (relative gain).
4. Power politics: The primary concern of all states is power and security.
  - States build up their militaries to survive, which may lead to a security dilemma.

Realists believe that mankind is not inherently benevolent but rather self-centered and competitive. This perspective, which is shared by theorists such as Thomas Hobbes, views human nature as egocentric (not necessarily selfish) and conflictual unless there exist conditions under which humans may coexist. It is also disposed of the notion that an individual's intuitive nature is made up of anarchy. In regards to self-interest, these individuals are self-reliant and are motivated in seeking more power. They are also believed to be fearful. This view contrasts with the approach of liberalism to international relations.

The state emphasizes an interest in accumulating power to ensure security in an anarchic world. Power is a concept primarily thought of in terms of material resources necessary to induce harm or coerce other states (to fight and win wars). The use of power places an emphasis on coercive tactics being acceptable to either accomplish something in the national interest or avoid something inimical to the national interest. The state is the most important actor under realism. It is unitary and autonomous because it speaks and acts with one voice. The power of the state is understood in terms of its military capabilities. A key concept under realism is the international distribution of power referred to as system polarity. Polarity refers to the number of blocs of states that exert power in an international system. A multipolar system is composed of three or more blocs, a bipolar system is composed of two blocs, and a unipolar system is dominated by a single power or hegemon. Under unipolarity realism predicts that states will band together to oppose the hegemon and restore a balance of power. Although all states seek hegemony under realism as the only way to ensure their own security, other states in the system are incentivised to prevent the emergence of a hegemon through balancing.

States employ the rational model of decision making by obtaining and acting upon complete and accurate information. The state is sovereign and guided by a national interest defined in terms of power. Since the only constraint of the international system is anarchy, there is no international authority and states are left to their own devices to ensure their own security. Realists believe that sovereign states are the principal actors in the international system. International institutions, non-governmental organizations, multinational corporations, individuals and other sub-state or trans-state actors are viewed as having little independent influence. States are inherently aggressive (offensive realism) and obsessed with security (defensive realism). Territorial expansion is only constrained by opposing powers. This aggressive build-up, however, leads to a security dilemma whereby increasing one's security may bring along even greater instability as an opposing power builds up its own arms in response (an arms race). Thus, security becomes a zero-sum game where only relative gains can be made. Moreover, the "relative gains" notion of the realist school implies that states must fight against each other to gain benefits.

Realists believe that there are no universal principles with which all states may guide their actions. Instead, a state must always be aware of the actions of the states around it and must use a pragmatic approach to resolve problems as they arise. A lack of certainty regarding intentions prompts mistrust and competition between states.

Rather than assume that states are the central actors, some realists, such as William Wohlforth and Randall Schweller refer instead to "groups" as the key actors of interest.

Finally, states are sometimes described as "billiard balls" or "black boxes". This analogy is meant to underscore the secondary importance of internal state dynamics and decisionmaking in realist models, in stark contrast to bureaucratic or individual-level theories of international relations.

== Realism in statecraft ==
The ideas behind George F. Kennan's work as a diplomat and diplomatic historian remain relevant to the debate over American foreign policy, which since the 19th century has been characterized by a shift from the Founding Fathers' realist school to the idealistic or Wilsonian school of international relations. In the realist tradition, security is based on the principle of a balance of power and the reliance on morality as the sole determining factor in statecraft is considered impractical. According to the Wilsonian approach, on the other hand, the spread of democracy abroad as a foreign policy is key and morals are universally valid. During the Presidency of Bill Clinton, American diplomacy reflected the Wilsonian school to such a degree that those in favor of the realist approach likened Clinton's policies to social work. Some argue that in Kennan's view of American diplomacy, based on the realist approach, such apparent moralism without regard to the realities of power and the national interest is self-defeating and may lead to the erosion of power, to America's detriment. Others argue that Kennan, a proponent of the Marshall Plan (which gave out bountiful American aid to post-WW2 countries), might agree that Clinton's aid functioned strategically to secure international leverage: a diplomatic maneuver well within the bounds of political realism as described by Hedley Bull.

Realists often hold that statesmen tend towards realism whereas realism is deeply unpopular among the public. When statesmen take actions that divert from realist policies, academic realists often argue that this is due to distortions that stem from domestic politics. However, some research suggests that realist policies are actually popular among the public whereas elites are more beholden to liberal ideas. Abrahamsen suggested that realpolitik for middle powers can include supporting idealism and liberal internationalism.

At the 2026 World Economic Forum, Canadian Prime Minister Mark Carney's speech framed international relations through the lens of realism, outlining an approach called "values-based realism," a concept he attributed to Finnish President Alexander Stubb. Quoting Thucydides, Carney stated that "the strong do what they can, and the weak must suffer what they must," to describe what he called a "brutal reality" where the post-World War II rules-based international order no longer applied.

== Historical branches and antecedents ==
While realism as a formal discipline in international relations did not arrive until World War II, its primary assumptions have been expressed in earlier writings. Realists trace the history of their ideas back to classical antiquity, beginning with Thucydides (fl. 5th century BCE).

Historian Jean Bethke Elshtain traces the historiography of realism:

The genealogy of realism as international relations, although acknowledging antecedents, gets down to serious business with Machiavelli, moving on to theorists of sovereignty and apologists for the national interest. It is present in its early modern forms with Hobbes's Leviathan (1651).

Modern realism began as a serious field of research in the United States during and after World War II. This evolution was partly fueled by European war migrants like Hans Morgenthau, whose work Politics Among Nations is considered a seminal development in the rise of modern realism. Other influential figures were George F. Kennan (known for his work on containment), Nicholas Spykman (known for his work on geostrategy and containment), Herman Kahn (known for his work on nuclear strategy) and E. H. Carr.

=== Classical realism ===
Classical realism states that it is fundamentally the nature of humans that pushes states and individuals to act in a way that places interests over ideologies. Classical realism is an ideology defined as the view that the "drive for power and the will to dominate [that are] held to be fundamental aspects of human nature". Prominent classical realists:

- E. H. Carr
- Hans Morgenthau
- Reinhold Niebuhr – Christian realism
- Raymond Aron
- George Kennan

=== Liberal realism or the English school of rationalism ===
The English school holds that the international system, while anarchical in structure, forms a "society of states" where common norms and interests allow for more order and stability than that which may be expected in a strict realist view. Prominent English School writer Hedley Bull's 1977 classic, The Anarchical Society, is a key statement of this position.

Prominent liberal realists:

- Hedley Bull – argued for both the existence of an international society of states and its perseverance even in times of great systemic upheaval, meaning regional or so-called "world wars"
- Martin Wight
- Barry Buzan

=== Neorealism or structural realism ===
Neorealism derives from classical realism except that instead of human nature, its focus is predominantly on the anarchic structure of the international system. States are primary actors because there is no political monopoly on force existing above any sovereign. While states remain the principal actors, greater attention is given to the forces above and below the states through levels of analysis or structure and agency debate. The international system is seen as a structure acting on the state with individuals below the level of the state acting as agency on the state as a whole.

While neorealism shares a focus on the international system with the English school, neorealism differs in the emphasis it places on the permanence of conflict. To ensure state security, states must be on constant preparation for conflict through economic and military build-up.

Prominent neorealists:

- Robert J. Art – neorealism
- Robert Gilpin – hegemonic theory
- Robert Jervis – defensive realism
- John Mearsheimer – offensive realism
- Barry Posen – neorealism
- Kenneth Waltz – defensive realism
- Stephen Walt – defensive realism

=== Neoclassical realism ===
Neoclassical realism can be seen as the third generation of realism, coming after the classical authors of the first wave (Thucydides, Niccolò Machiavelli, Thomas Hobbes) and the neorealists (especially Kenneth Waltz). Its designation of "neoclassical", then, has a double meaning:

1. It offers the classics a renaissance;
2. It is a synthesis of the neorealist and the classical realist approaches.

Gideon Rose is responsible for coining the term in a book review he wrote in 1998.

The primary motivation underlying the development of neoclassical realism was that neorealism was only useful to explain political outcomes (classified as being theories of international politics), but had nothing to offer about particular states' behavior (or theories of foreign policy). The basic approach, then, was for these authors to "refine, not refute, Kenneth Waltz", by adding domestic intervening variables between systemic incentives and a state's foreign policy decision. Thus, the basic theoretical architecture of neoclassical realism is:

Distribution of power in the international system (independent variable)
Domestic perception of the system and domestic incentives (intervening variable)
Foreign policy decision (dependent variable)

While neoclassical realism has only been used for theories of foreign policy so far, Randall Schweller notes that it could be useful to explain certain types of political outcomes as well.

Neoclassical realism is particularly appealing from a research standpoint because it still retains a lot of the theoretical rigor that Waltz has brought to realism, but at the same time can easily incorporate a content-rich analysis, since its main method for testing theories is the process-tracing of case studies.

Prominent neoclassical realists:

- Aaron Friedberg
- Randall Schweller
- William Wohlforth
- Fareed Zakaria

=== Realist constructivism ===
Some see a complementarity between realism and constructivism. Samuel Barkin, for instance, holds that "realist constructivism" can fruitfully "study the relationship between normative structures, the carriers of political morality, and uses of power" in ways that existing approaches do not. Similarly, Jennifer Sterling-Folker has argued that theoretical synthesis helps explanations of international monetary policy by combining realism's emphasis of an anarchic system with constructivism's insights regarding important factors from the domestic level. Scholars such as Oded Löwenheim and Ned Lebow have also been associated with realist constructivism.

=== Regional neorealism ===
An international relations theory proposed by Anthony Heron. It builds on classical and structural realist traditions by arguing that states respond primarily to security pressures within their regional environment rather than to the global system as a whole. The framework suggests that regional security structures possess their own polarity, threat hierarchies, and power distributions that can diverge from global-level dynamics.

Heron's approach departs from traditional neorealism, which treats the international system as a single, uniform structure defined by global anarchy. Regional neorealism instead conceptualises the system as a set of overlapping regional security architectures that exert distinct constraints on state behaviour. According to the theory, geography, resource distribution, and the density of local institutions create region-specific structural logics.

States experience incentives produced by both global and regional structures, but regional pressures are considered more immediate and behaviour-shaping. The theory conforms with both concepts of defensive and offensive realism, suggesting that regional factors alone determine whether conflict between states exhibits traits of each school.

Heron developed the framework in response to empirical cases during his scholarly work on the Arctic, where states acted contrary to predictions derived from global-level structural incentives, particularly in medium-power regions.

== Criticisms ==
=== Political myopia ===
The term itself has been criticized as a euphemism for political myopia and prioritization of short-term, superficial goals at the expense at the expense of long-term consequences. Critics pointed to United States' support for authoritarian regimes in Latin America in the 20th century as an example of "realist" myopia motivated by anti-communism that later caused the developed anti-Americanism.

=== Democratic peace ===
Advocates of democratic peace theory argue that realist thought does not apply well to relations between democratic states. They point to empirical studies suggesting that mature democracies rarely, if ever, go to war with one another.

Realist scholars and others have challenged this conclusion. They argue that findings of 'no wars between democracies' depend heavily on how researchers define key terms such as 'war' and 'democracy', and that these definitions are often calibrated in ways that produce the desired result. Realists argue there are also counter-examples, such as ongoing conflicts between democratic countries such as India and Pakistan and Israel and Lebanon, as well as the Falklands War (between the United Kingdom and Argentina) and the Second Nagorno-Karabakh War of 2020 (between Armenia and Azerbaijan), though each of these is also subject to debate and examples such as the Falklands War or Second Nagorno-Karabakh War were criticized because one of the sides had an authoritarian system during these conflicts (National Reorganization Process in Argentina and Azerbaijan under Ilham Aliyev regime, respectively).

The interactive model of democratic peace theory suggests a gradual influence of democratic norms and levels of democratic difference on the likelihood of war and militarized interstate disputes. Some scholars add that even within a realist framework a democratic government may simply judge most potential conflicts as offering too little strategic gain to justify the costs, which means that realism does not necessarily imply a general propensity for inter-state warfare.

=== Hegemonic peace and conflict ===
Some advocates of hegemonic stability theory argue that realist theories centered on hegemonic stability offer an incomplete account of how great powers shape international order. Historian Niall Ferguson contends that the concept of 'hegemony' obscures crucial distinctions between economic leadership and the broader military, administrative and cultural mechanisms historically associated with empire. He argues that Anglo-American power is poorly captured by a narrow economic model, and that hegemonic stability theory underestimates both the coercive and institutional apparatus of past empires and the limits of contemporary American power. In his view, analysing the United States solely as a hegemon risks overstating its capacity to generate global order and understating the scale and character of earlier imperial systems.

Daniel Deudney and John Ikenberry challenge the common claim among academic realists that the 2003 Iraq War was driven chiefly by liberal internationalism. They argue that the war is more convincingly explained by hegemonic realism. According to their analysis, leading advocates of the invasion sought to preserve American primacy, neutralise a perceived regional challenger, and demonstrate US military dominance. These aims, they contend, followed a pattern of hegemonic statecraft rather than liberal idealism. Liberal internationalists who supported the war did so largely out of concerns about weapons-of-mass-destruction proliferation and the viability of multilateral arms-control regimes, not because of an agenda of democracy promotion.

John Mearsheimer, by contrast, argues that many post-Cold War American interventions were not expressions of realist logic at all, but products of an ambitious attempt to construct and universalise a liberal international order. He maintains that this project was structurally flawed: liberal expansion provoked nationalist resistance, created domestic economic strains within liberal societies, and depended on a fleeting period of unipolarity. For Mearsheimer, the difficulties of the liberal order stem from liberal overreach rather than from a realist impulse to exploit American hegemony.

=== Inconsistent with non-European politics ===
Scholars have argued that realist theories, in particular realist conceptions of anarchy and balances of power, have not characterized the international systems of East Asia and Africa (before, during and after colonization).

=== State-centrism ===
Scholars have criticized realist theories of international relations for assuming that states are fixed and unitary units.

=== Appeasement ===
In the United Kingdom, realism fell into disrepute during the mid-twentieth century because it became associated with the policy of appeasement in the 1930s. The school regained influence only gradually during the Cold War, when strategic and security concerns revived interest in realist analysis.

Aaron McKeil has argued that contemporary realist proposals for restraint and 'offshore balancing' carry their own significant risks. While such approaches are intended to avoid the costly interventions associated with liberal internationalism, McKeil contends that they would likely generate a greater reliance on proxy warfare and offer few institutions, norms, or ordering practices capable of managing the resulting great power competition. On his reading, these limitations raise doubts about whether realist alternatives can sustain international order in the twenty-first century, and suggest that they may instead become new sources of international disorder.

=== Realism as degenerative research programs ===
John Vasquez applies Imre Lakatos's criteria, and concludes that realist-based research program is seen as degenerating due to the protean character of its theoretical development, an unwillingness to specify what makes the true theory, a continuous adoption of auxiliary propositions to explain away flaws, and lack of strong research findings. Vasquez points out that while Kenneth Waltz's theory predicted that states would balance against power, subsequent realists have introduced contradictory propositions, to account for the fact that states frequently do not balance as expected. Vasquez concludes that this "protean character" allows the realist paradigm to accommodate nearly any behavioral outcome, effectively creating a scenario that prevents the theory from being truly tested or rejected despite a general dearth of strong empirical findings. Against Vasquez, Stephen Walt argues that Vasquez overlook the progressive power of realist theory. Kenneth Waltz claims that Vasquez misunderstand Lakatos.

== See also ==
- Complex interdependence
- Consensus reality
- Consequentialism
- International legal theory
- Game theory
- Global justice
- Legalism (Chinese philosophy)
- Might makes right
- Negarchy
- Peace through strength
- Realpolitik
- Moral nihilism
- Political globalization
- Deterrence theory
