= Robert J. Art =

American academic

- Awards: Guggenheim Fellowship (1975)

Academic background
- Education: Columbia University (BA); Harvard University (PhD)

Academic work
- Discipline: Political science
- Sub-discipline: International Relations
- Institutions: Brandeis University

Robert Jeffrey Art (born 1942) is Christian A. Herter Professor of International Relations at Brandeis University, and Fellow at MIT Center for International Studies. He subscribes to the theory of neorealism, which argues that force still underlies the power structure in the modern world. He is a member of the Council on Foreign Relations, a United States nonprofit think tank specializing in U.S. foreign policy and international affairs.

== Life ==
Professor Art received his B.A. from Columbia College in 1964 and his Ph.D. from Harvard University in 1968.

Professor Art is a former member of the Secretary of Defense's Long Range Planning Staff (1982) and a former Dean of the Graduate School of Arts and Sciences at Brandeis, and has consulted for the Central Intelligence Agency. He is a member of the editorial boards of the scholarly journals International Security, Political Science Quarterly, and Security Studies. Since 1982, he has also co-edited Cornell University's "Series in Security Studies."

He has lectured at numerous American universities and research institutes and at the following U.S. military and foreign institutions: the U.S. Army War College, the U.S. National War College, West Point, the U.S. Air Force Academy, the U.S. Marine Command and Staff College, the U.S. Air Force Command and Staff College, the U.S. Air University, the U.S. Naval Postgraduate School, the U.S. Industrial College of the Armed Forces, the National War College (Beijing), the People's University (Beijing), the Institute for War Studies (King's College, London), the Free University of Berlin, the Konrad Adenauer Institute (Berlin), the NATO School (Oberammergau), and the Führungsakademie der Bundeswehr (Hamburg).

== Miscellaneous views ==
Art has been critical of NATO's expansion, writing in 1998 that

The United States and its NATO allies have gotten themselves into a real pickle […] [w]ith their decision to enlarge NATO by taking in Poland, Hungary, and the Czech Republic […] How large can a NATO-without-Russia become before the West more or less permanently alienates Russia? […] Taking in Ukraine without also inducting Russia is the quickest way to alienate Russia […] and would justifiably give rise within Russia to fears of encirclement by, and exclusion from, the West.

== Awards ==
He has received grants from the Center for International Affairs at Harvard University, the Council on Foreign Relations (International Affairs Fellow), the Guggenheim Foundation, the Ford Foundation, the United States Institute of Peace, and the Century Foundation.

== Selected works ==
=== Books ===
- The TFX Decision: McNamara and the Military (1968)
- Reorganizing America's Defense (1985) -- contributor and co-editor, with Samuel P. Huntington and Vincent Davis)
- U.S. Foreign Policy: the Search for a New Role (1993) -- contributor and co-editor with Seyom Brown
- International politics: Enduring concepts and contemporary issues (1996) -- contributor and co-editor with Robert Jervis
- The United States and Coercive Diplomacy (2003) -- contributor and co-editor with Patrick Cronin
- A Grand Strategy for America (2003) – a finalist for the Arthur B. Ross Award of the Council on Foreign Relations
- Democracy and Counterterrorism (2007) -- contributor and co-editor with Louise Richardson
- America's Grand Strategy and World Politics (2009)

=== Articles ===
- The United States and the Rise of China: Implications for the Long Haul, Political Science Quarterly, (2010)
