= Groupism =

Theoretical approach in sociology

Groupism is a theoretical approach in sociology that posits that conformity to the laws/norms of a group such as family, kinship, race, ethnicity, religion and nationality brings reciprocal benefits such as recognition, right, power and security. It is the principle that a person's primary or prioritised identity is that of membership in a social network. Groupists assume that individuals in a group tend to have stronger affinity and obligation to a particular group when the influence of an authority figure brings a common goal. The concept of groupism can be defined and criticized in varied ways for disciplines such as sociology, social psychology, anthropology, political history and philosophy. Group-ism is defined in most dictionaries as the behavior of a member of a group where they think and act as the group norm at the expense of individualism. The term originated around mid 19th century and the first known use of the word recorded was in 1851. It is a general definition often used in Indian English as the tendency to form factions in a system setting. The term had also been used for "the principles or practices of Oxford Group movement" which is now historical and rare.

== Perspectives: criticism ==
=== Social groupism ===
"The tendency to take discrete, sharply differentiated, internally homogeneous and externally bounded groups as basic constituents of social life, chief protagonists of social conflicts, and fundamental units of social analysis"

Groupism has been a deeply entrenched and fundamental aspect of social analysis of nationalism, ethnicity, race, religion, gender, sexuality, age, class or even groups with combination of these categories but with a common interest in other universal categories like sports, music and values. It is commonly seen on everyday context in media reports and even academic research leading to policy analysis. According to Brubaker, it is the view that division among humans such as ethnicity is an absolute, unchanging entity rather than a changing conceptual variable subject to time and context. It is the tendency to take discrete groups as chief protagonists of social conflicts, to reify such groups as if they were unitary collective actors. It is considered a "process in which individuals are reduced to specific group characteristic which are politicised as boundaries". Conceptual groupism involves essentialising groups without taking into account that such habit of giving groups performative character taken into account in ethnopolitical conflict analysis could lead to intentional/unintentional framing of conflict between groups. In the example of ethnic groups, it involves viewing an individual in the group as the collective representative of the values or conflicts associated with the social norm of that group. American sociologist Rogers Brubaker has criticised conceptual groupism for its stereotypical approach in social and political analysis which leads to decisions that trivialize individual need to protect the labelled collective interest of a political group or institution. Brubaker suggests that instead of taking "groups" as substantial entities, social and political analysis of the "groupness" should be brought about in terms of political, social, cultural and psychological processes listed below

- Distinguishing practical categories and groups
- Group making as a sociopolitical and cultural project
- From categories to cognitive schema
- Discursive frames
- Organizational routines
- Institutional forms
- Political projects
- Contingent events

According to Norwegian anthropologist Fredric Barth, ethnicity, race and nationality categories are a matter of factors such as self identification/external categorisation, at individual/institutional level or formal/ informal context. Research on how ethnic, racial and national groups are classified and categorised began through studies on the colonial and post colonial societies. Brubaker suggests that there should be a focus on categories so that ethnicity, race and nationhood can co exist without ethnic 'groups' as separate entities as transforming groups into categories reduces the extent to which misleading political and legal analysis based on groupism turns to a framed reality.

=== Legal groupism ===
Legal groupism is the construction of groups in legal matter as defined by the German legal scholar Susanne Baer. Legal groupism also posits that equal right should be given to groups hence assuming that people always belong to a "distinguishable" group rather than many. This concept is regarded as problematic because most groups have unclear and shifting boundaries due to individuals living multiple identities and group characteristics. Therefore, Legal groupism come into conflict with the idea of individual rights when human rights issues are constructed as group issues in law and complete autonomy given to major religious institution in the name of religious freedom then curtail individual human right issues. For example, when constitutional law allows churches and religious communities to self determine matters conflicting with human rights without considering the rights of diverse individuals within a seemingly homogeneous group, such overlapping between human rights and religion has led to lack of legal intervention in matters like sexual discrimination. For example, religious authority power to internally handle child abuse cases, the European Union's exemption of religious organisation from fundamental rights in the EU proposal for a new Directive against discrimination 2008.

=== Groupcism ===
A closely related concept to groupism is Groupcism, a term coined in 2025 by a University of Manchester researcher, Patrick Effiong Ben, to describe a subtle form of discrimination that is common within in-groups. In contrast to groupism, groupcism denotes a form of social distance and the accompanying sense of exclusion experienced within one's circle of friends, associates, or social group. As a distinct form of discriminatory behaviour that occurs within specific social and spatial contexts among individuals with shared projects, affiliations, and other nonfamilial in-group relationships, groupcism is caused by one's non-participation in the social activities of a sub-group within a broader in-group of which one is a member, for personal reasons. However, a salient feature of groupcist discrimination is the agency of individuals to opt in and out of the sub-group activities within the larger in-group that engenders groupcism. Notably, as a type of discrimination, groupcism is regarded as acceptable due to other things that members of the in-group share in common outside the social environment where one is groupcised or where one experiences groupcism.

== Case studies ==
=== Legal status of indigenous people: Sami focus ===
It has been estimated that there are over 300 million indigenous people around the world some among which includes the Red Indians, Sami in Northern Europe, the Aborigines and Torres Strait Islanders of Australia and the Maori of New Zealand, Ainu people of Japan, Bantu in Somalia, Assyrians of the Middle east, the Kazakhs, Mongols, Tajik, Tibetans, Ugyur, and Eurasian Nomads of Kazakhstan, eastern Russia. In order to acquire group rights indigenous people also happen to be under the regulation of national and international law. Although International customary law at the United nation and elsewhere has regarded indigenous people as a category since the 20th century, the definition of indigenous people has been a subject of ongoing debate at the national level since their classification as a group by the national law has interfered with their traditional group making processes. For example, The Finland government ratified ILO convention no.169 in 1989 which involved declaration of right for indigenous people of Finland such as the following definition of legal requirement to vote to the election of the Sami parliament.

"For the purpose of this Act, a Sami means a person who considers himself a Sami, provided:

1. That he himself or at least one of his parents or grandparents has learnt Sami as his first language;

2. That he is a descendant of a person who has been entered in a land, taxation or population register as a mountain, forest or fishing Lapp; or

3. That at least one of his parents has or could have been registered as an elector for an election to the Sami Delegation or the Sami Parliament."

This definition has led to the Sámi debate in Finland a problem of defining the legal status of Sámi indigenous people as the groupist system of political and legal analysis has framed indigeinity as a political requirement rather than an ethnocultural reality hence the inconsistency between the definition that Sami people has held for their kinship.

=== Groupism in Japan ===
Groupism is viewed as deeply rooted part of the Japanese group oriented society known for their high productivity, cooperative attitude and surpassing international competitive strength. Some of the key aspects of groupism in Japanese society has been discussed in the journal article, 'The Paradox of Japan's Groupism: Threat to Future Competitiveness' by Kanji Haitani.

1. Identity and well-being: unmei kyodotai meaning "communities of shared destiny" is a core principle in Japanese culture where an individual's well-being and sense of security is maximised as a result of recognition and prosperity they get as a group.
2. Seniority: There is close correlation between a member's age and their rank in a system.
3. Emphasis on the relationships of harmony and conflict (wa): The wa concept encompasses the concept of 'Isshin – dotai' meaning 'one mind – same body'. Here 'one mind' refers to how senior members take into account the views of junior members who reciprocally internalizes the wisdom of the senior members.
4. The insider-outsider mentality: Insider and Outsider groups are generally separated with clear distinction.
5. Rank and status consciousness
6. The closed nature of Japanese market in context of international economy

==== Social hierarchy in traditional music making process ====
The ryūha-iemoto system refers to social organisation in Japanese traditional music making which is shown to be dominated by the hierarchical form of groupism. This involves an authoritative group called "Miyagi- ha" at the top of hierarchy who gets the greatest benefits of musical freedom, recognition, power and money. This group is known for transmission of their composition to subgroups down in the hierarchy. One of the characteristics of this form of social organisation involves lifetime affiliation as a subgroup member whereby there is no "graduation" or "becoming a free musician".

== Effects: conceptual links ==
=== Nationalism ===
A form of groupism which generally began as a sense of security provided by national identity to an unquestioning acceptance of a political agenda. It is based on an abstract mentality of "victory" in one's own group and considering the "other" as a separate entity. The irrational obedience of German citizens during the Nazi regime of the 1930s and 1940s holocaust is a well known example of the negative consequences rooted in groupism. In terms of Legal studies, international lawyer Philip Allot has criticized the concept of state sovereignty in the current international laws in promoting groupism and the lack of reform in the 21st century context.

=== Prejudice and discrimination ===
Prejudice against certain groups of people is rooted in groupism whereby conclusions or attitude about a group of people is drawn without evaluating the evidence and often leads to discrimination which refers to the behaviour of treating other groups in a different way than one's own group.^{[9]}

- In-group bias: The tendency to favor members of one's own group than a person outside the group such as in sports or celebrity fan behavior.
- Out group homogeneity: The tendency to view all members from other groups as highly similar rather than viewing them as individuals.

=== Persuasion ===
Persuasion through individuals, sub-groups or the group as a whole leads to behavioural change without rational choice. It also involves the power of normative influence from one's heritage, culture and tradition to which people comply with its social norms to gain recognition or to avoid other's disapproval. These concepts are broadly summarised in terms of groupism and can have both positive and negative connotation based on varying scale of groupism in a formal or informal system. Extreme forms of groupism well known in the past and present includes racism, bigotry, terrorism, genocide, dictatorship and war.

=== Social psychology ===
Social Psychology brings the concept of how individual psyche is shaped by the sociological constructs. In summary, social constructs formed by prejudice, discrimination, racism and nationalism can be ascribed to groupism which an individual can obtain throughout life based on their socio-cultural and historical context that leads to psychological development as a child. Social loafing is the phenomenon when the presence of other members in a group causes some to avoid responsibilities and exert less effort towards a group goal. Social disruption whereby the presence of others negatively influences the performance of tasks. Social facilitation which is a phenomenon proposed by Robert Zajonc is another example of the positive aspects of groupism where the presence and influence of diverse groups enhances the performance of a task. This is the opposite of social disruption whereby the presence of others negatively influences the performance of tasks that are relatively difficult.

=== Group selection ===
Scientific evidence from early hominids in Africa that shows humans have evolved as small social groups that are predisposed to include or exclude others in an instinctual manner. Evolution of humans as a unitary social species has led to the social status and sense of belonging that comes with identifying oneself or being identified as an individual in different categories of group. Research by anthropologist Robin Dunbar suggested that the ratio of the size of the neocortex to the brain size determines the amount of social relationship in different species and found that humans have relatively high social brain that can have tendency to form greater interpersonal networks of small groups than animals such as chimpanzees and dolphins with smaller neocortex size to brain size ratio hence smaller number of relationships. Groupism has been explained in terms of a biological need to form social bonds according to the need to belong theory whereby deprivation of this need has been shown to have Bio-psycho-social consequences. From the perspective of evolution, social influences on the individual based on natural selection has led to better adaptation and survival in various environments.
