= Dale C. Copeland =

American academic (born 1960)

Dale C. Copeland (born 1960) is a Canadian professor of international relations with a focus on trade, war and economic interdependence.

== Bibliography ==
- Origins of Major War. Cornell University Press, 2001.
- Economic Interdependence and War. Princeton University Press, 2014
- A World Safe for Commerce: American Foreign Policy from the Revolution to the Rise of China. Princeton University Press, 2024

== See also ==
Economic interdependence
