= International Security (journal) =

- Discipline: International and national security, International relations
- Language: English
- Edited by: Steven E. Miller

Publication details
- History: 1976–present
- Publisher: MIT Press for the Belfer Center for Science and International Affairs (United States)
- Frequency: Quarterly
- Impact factor: 4.135 (2017)

Standard abbreviations
- ISO 4: Int. Secur.

Indexing
- ISSN: 0162-2889 (print); 1531-4804 (web)
- JSTOR: 01622889
- OCLC no.: 44911437

Links
- Journal homepage; Online access; Online archive

International Security is a peer-reviewed academic journal in the field of international and national security. It was founded in 1976 and is edited by the Belfer Center for Science and International Affairs at Harvard University and published four times a year by MIT Press, both of Cambridge, Massachusetts. The current editor-in-chief is Steven E. Miller (Harvard).

International Security is among the leading journals in the field of international relations. According to Journal Citation Reports, it has a 2017 impact factor of 4.135, ranking it 2nd out of 85 journals in the category "International Relations". Along with Security Studies, it is among the most prominent journals dedicated to security studies. Articles in International Security tend to deploy qualitative methods, in particular qualitative historical analysis. Articles are also more likely to include policy prescriptions than other leading IR journals.

The first article in International Security was Hedley Bull's "Arms Control and World Order."
