= Theory of International Politics =

1979 book by Kenneth Waltz

- Author: Kenneth Waltz
- Subject: International relations
- Published: 1979 (McGraw-Hill)
- Pages: 251

Theory of International Politics is a 1979 book on international relations theory by Kenneth Waltz that creates a structural realist theory, neorealism, to explain international relations. Taking into account the influence of neoclassical economic theory, Waltz argued that the fundamental "ordering principle" (p. 88) of the international political system is anarchy, which is defined by the presence of "functionally undifferentiated" (p. 97) individual state actors lacking "relations of super- and subordination" (p. 88) that are distinguished only by their varying capabilities.

Waltz challenges reductionist approaches to international politics, arguing that they fail to account for similar behaviors across states (Ch. 4). According to Waltz, system-level processes of socialization and competition lead states to behave in similar ways (p. 76).

Waltz argues that broad patterns of state behavior can be understood as a consequence of states pursuing incentives provided by the anarchic structure of the international system. He argues that states pursue their security above other goals, which limits the potential for cooperation and creates security competition. One of the major findings of the book is that states tend to balance against power, which leads to the persistent formation of balances of power. Waltz also argues that bipolarity (the presence of two great powers) is more stable than multipolarity (the presence of three or more great powers).

It is arguably the most influential book in international relations, causing a fundamental discursive transformation and bringing the concept of anarchy to the forefront. It is the most assigned book in International Relations graduate training at U.S. universities. John Mearsheimer describes it as among the three most influential realist works of international relations of the 20th century, Charles Glaser characterized it as the "defining work" in the neorealist international relations literature, and Robert Jervis wrote in 1998 that the book was "the most important book in the field in the past decade." The book caused a resurgence of realism in the field of international relations.

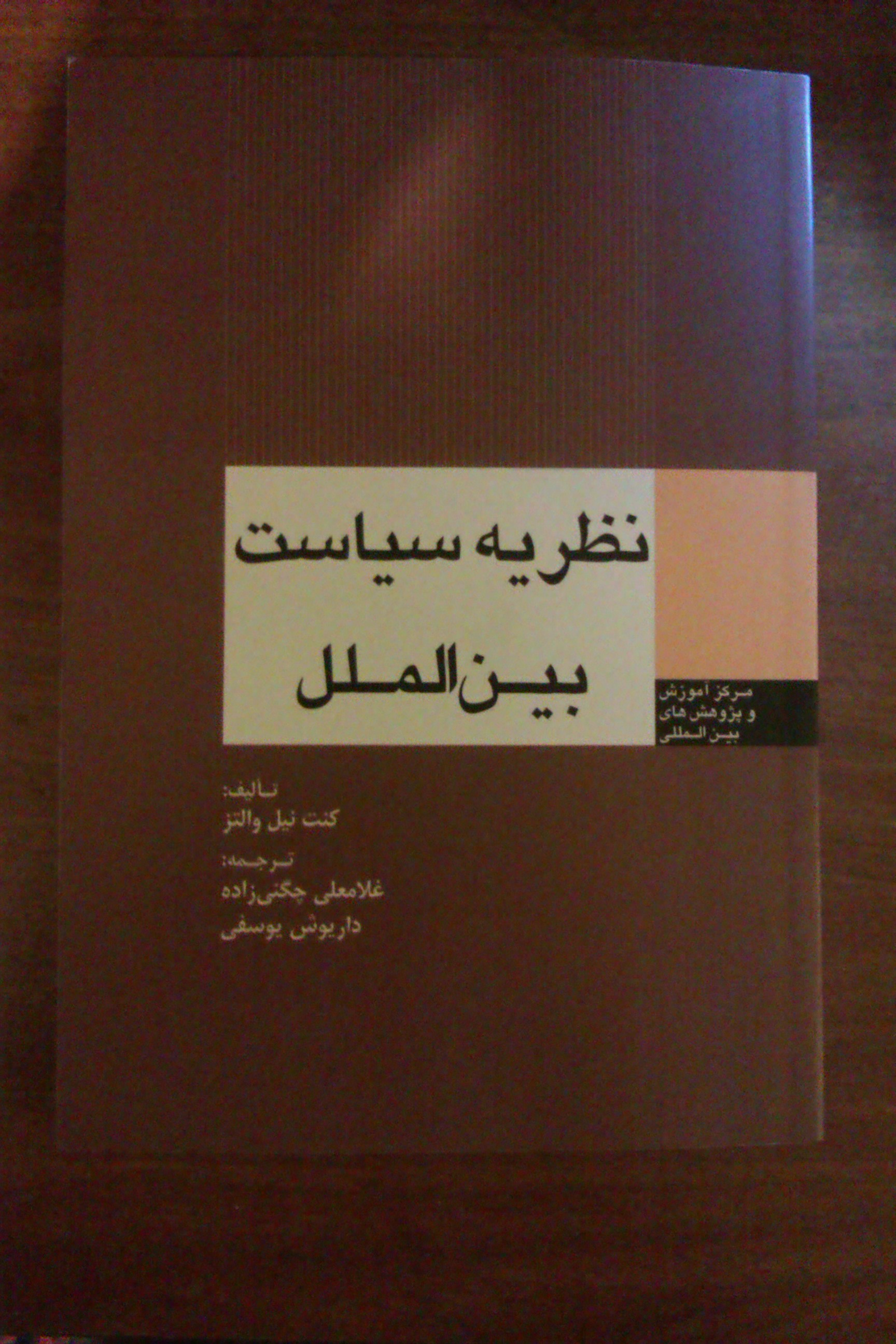
A Persian translation of "Theory of International Politics"

== See also ==
- Social Theory of International Politics
