= Christopher Layne =

American academic

Christopher Layne (born November 2, 1949) is an American academic specialising in foreign policy. He is currently Robert M. Gates Chair in Intelligence and National Security at the George Bush School of Government and Public Service at Texas A&M University. He was previously a professor at the University of Miami. His neorealist position in contemporary global politics is discussed in his 2006 book The Peace of Illusions.

Layne has also written for the libertarian Cato Institute, the RAND Corporation, The American Conservative magazine, and The National Interest magazine.

== Books ==
- Should America Promote Democracy? - A Debate, with Sean M. Lynn-Jones (MIT Press, 1998)
- The Peace of Illusions: American Grand Strategy from 1940 to the Present (Cornell, 2006)
- American Empire: A Debate, with Bradley A. Thayer (Routledge, 2006)
