= John Mearsheimer bibliography =

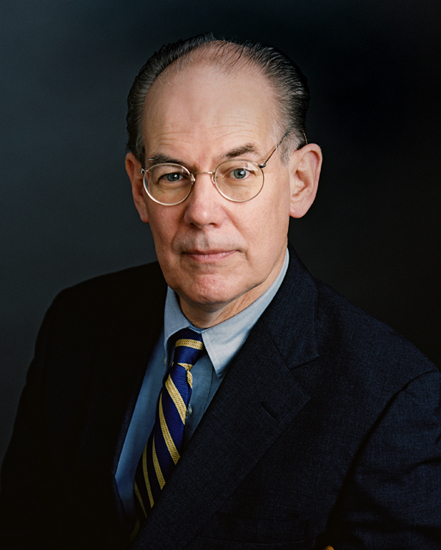
- Mearsheimer in 2007
- Books↙: Conventional Deterrence (1983); The Tragedy of Great Power Politics (2001); The Israel Lobby and U.S. Foreign Policy (2007); Why Leaders Lie: The Truth About Lying in International Politics (2011); The Great Delusion: Liberal Dreams and International Realities (2018)
- Articles↙: "Why the Soviets Can't Win Quickly in Central Europe"

This is a list of works by John Mearsheimer (born 1947), an American political scientist and international relations scholar who is the R. Wendell Harrison Distinguished Service Professor at the University of Chicago. Mearsheimer's works cover international relations theory, international security and deterrence theory and he is best known for developing the neorealist (or structural realist) theory of offensive realism which describes the interaction between great powers as being primarily driven by the rational desire to achieve regional hegemony in an anarchic international system. His most notable publications include "Why the Soviets Can't Win Quickly in Central Europe" (1982), Conventional Deterrence (1983), Liddell Hart and the Weight of History (1988), The Tragedy of Great Power Politics (2001) where he postulates that China's growing power will likely bring it into conflict with the United States, The Israel Lobby and U.S. Foreign Policy (2007) about the Israel lobby in the United States, Why Leaders Lie: The Truth About Lying in International Politics (2011) and The Great Delusion: Liberal Dreams and International Realities (2018) which criticizes the "liberal international order".

His literary output has been the subject of an academic paper, which concluded that in his later years, he has focused increasingly on "current events and conflicts".

== Thesis ==
- — (August 1981). The Theory and Practice of Conventional Deterrence (PhD thesis). Ithaca: Cornell University. OCLC 8947951.

== Articles ==
=== Journal articles ===
- — (1979). "Precision-guided munitions and conventional deterrence" (PDF). Survival. 21 (2): 68–76. doi:10.1080/00396337908441802. ISSN 0039-6338. Archived from the original (PDF) on June 12, 2010.
  - Criticised by Dan Gouré and Gordon McCormick the following year, published with a rejoinder by Mearsheimer. Referenced in several later studies on the topic but without extensive discussion: by Robert Mandel, David Blagden, Lauren Kahn and Michael C. Horowitz.
- — (1980). "Debate on precision-guided munitions: Rejoinder" (PDF). Survival. 22 (1): 20–22. doi:10.1080/00396338008441860. ISSN 0039-6338. Archived from the original (PDF) on June 12, 2010.
- — (1981). "The British Generals Talk: A Review Essay" (PDF). International Security. 6 (1): 165–184. doi:10.1162/isec.6.1.165 (inactive July 6, 2025). ISSN 0162-2889. Archived from the original (PDF) on June 12, 2010.
- — (1982). "Maneuver, Mobile Defense, and the NATO Central Front" (PDF). International Security. 6 (3): 104–122. doi:10.2307/2538609. ISSN 0162-2889. JSTOR 2538609. Archived from the original (PDF) on June 12, 2010.
  - Described by Barry Posen as "a critical discussion of the possible tactical implications of the military reformers' prescriptions for ground warfare" and regarded as important though not convincing by David P. Calleo, it was referenced in the first years after its publication, but its first detailed critique came from Joshua M. Epstein and several others in the context of the replacement of combined arms with maneuver doctrine in the United States Armed Forces around 1989 and in the context of NATO's tactical future after the Cold War. It has seen occasional treatments in retrospective literature since that time.
- —; Schoenbaum, David (January 4, 1982). "Correspondence: Clausewitz and the British Generals" (PDF). International Security. 6 (3): 223–229. doi:10.2307/2538616. ISSN 0162-2889. JSTOR 2538616. Archived from the original (PDF) on June 12, 2010.
- — (1982). "Why the Soviets Can't Win Quickly in Central Europe". International Security. 7 (1): 3–39. doi:10.2307/2538686. ISSN 0162-2889.
- — (1983). "The Military Reform Movement: A Critical Assessment" (PDF). Orbis: A Journal for World Affairs. 27 (2): 285–300. ISSN 0030-4387. Archived from the original (PDF) on June 12, 2010.
- — (1984). "Nuclear Weapons and Deterrence in Europe" (PDF). International Security. 9 (3): 19–46. doi:10.2307/2538586. JSTOR 2538586.
- — (1985). "Prospects for Conventional Deterrence in Europe" (PDF). Bulletin of the Atomic Scientists. 41 (7): 158–162. Bibcode:1985BuAtS..41g.158M. doi:10.1080/00963402.1985.11456021. ISSN 0096-3402.
- — (1986). "A Strategic Misstep: The Maritime Strategy and Deterrence in Europe" (PDF). International Security. 11 (2): 3–57. doi:10.2307/2538957. ISSN 0162-2889. JSTOR 2538957. Archived from the original (PDF) on June 12, 2010.
- — (1988). "Numbers, Strategy, and the European Balance" (PDF). International Security. 12 (4): 174–185. doi:10.2307/2539001. ISSN 0162-2889. JSTOR 2539001. Archived from the original (PDF) on June 12, 2010.
- — (1989). "Assessing the Conventional Balance: The 3:1 Rule and Its Critics". International Security. 13 (4): 54–89. doi:10.2307/2538780. ISSN 0162-2889. JSTOR 2538780.
- —; Posen, Barry R.; Cohen, Eliot A. (1989). "Reassessing Net Assessment" (PDF). International Security. 13 (4): 128–179. doi:10.2307/2538782. ISSN 0162-2889. JSTOR 2538782. Archived from the original (PDF) on June 12, 2010.
- — (1990). "Back to the Future: Instability in Europe after the Cold War" (PDF). International Security. 15 (1): 5–56. doi:10.2307/2538981. ISSN 0162-2889. JSTOR 2538981.
  - The article's thesis turned out to be incorrect, but the article itself was retrospectively praised for its testable framing by Junio and Mahnken 2013.

Mearsheimer's article provides an excellent example of scenario analysis being used to extend an existing theory and develop testable hypotheses that were subsequently falsified. Various reasons may explain why his theory was incorrect—such as normative claims, continued reliance on US security guarantees, and so on—but it is at least clear that his scenario-based approach framed a debate in a rigorous and clearly articulated way and has led to new areas of exploration for the discipline.

— Timothy Junio and Thomas Mahnken, Conceiving of Future War: The Promise of Scenario Analysis for International Relations (2013)

- —; Hoffmann, Stanley; Keohane, Robert O. (1990). "Back to the Future, Part II: International Relations Theory and Post-Cold War Europe". International Security. 15 (2): 191–199. doi:10.2307/2538869. ISSN 0162-2889. JSTOR 2538869.
- —; Risse-Kappen, Thomas; Russett, Bruce M. (1990). "Back to the Future, Part III: Realism and the Realities of European Security". International Security. 15 (3): 216–222. doi:10.2307/2538912. ISSN 0162-2889. JSTOR 2538912.
- — (1990). "After the Cold War: Will We Miss It?". Current History. 327: 30–41. ISSN 0011-3530.
- —; Shapley, Deborah (1993). "McNamara's War" (PDF). Bulletin of the Atomic Scientists. 49 (6): 49–51. doi:10.1080/00963402.1993.11456373. ISSN 0096-3402.
- — (1994). "The False Promise of International Institutions" (PDF). International Security. 19 (3): 5–49. doi:10.2307/2539078. ISSN 0162-2889. JSTOR 2539078.
- — (1995). "A Realist Reply". International Security. 20 (1): 82–93. doi:10.2307/2539218. ISSN 0162-2889. JSTOR 2539218.
  - This article was Mearsheimer's defense of his The False Promise of International Institutions.
- — (1998). "The Aims of Education" (PDF). Philosophy and Literature. 22 (1): 137–155. ISSN 0190-0013. cite-14
- — (1998). "Mearsheimer's Response: "Teaching Morality at the Margins"" (PDF). Philosophy and Literature. 22 (1): 193–198. ISSN 0190-0013.
- —; Walt, Stephen M. (2003). "Can Saddam be Contained? History Says Yes" (PDF). Foreign Policy Bulletin. 14 (1): 219–224. doi:10.1017/S1052703600006109. ISSN 1052-7036.
- — (June 2006). "Author's Response: Will China and the United States Clash?". Issues & Studies. 39 (2): 259–262. ISSN 1013-2511.
  - This article was Mearsheimer's defense of his book, The Tragedy of Great Power Politics.
- —; Rogers, Paul; Little, Richard; Hill, Christopher; Brown, Chris; Booth, Jen (2005). "Roundtable: The Battle Rages On". International Relations. 19 (3): 337–360. doi:10.1177/0047117805055411. ISSN 0047-1178.
- — (2005). "E.H. Carr vs. Idealism: The Battle Rages On" (PDF). International Relations. 19 (2): 139–152. doi:10.1177/0047117805052810. eISSN 1741-2862.
- — (2006). "China's Unpeaceful Rise" (PDF). Current History. 105 (690): 160–162. doi:10.1525/curh.2006.105.690.160. ISSN 0011-3530.
- —; Walt, Stephen M. "The Israel Lobby and U.S. Foreign Policy" (PDF). London Review of Books. 28 (6) (1st ed.): 3–12. ISSN 0260-9592. Revised version published as —; Walt, Stephen M. (September 14, 2006). "The Israel Lobby and U.S. Foreign Policy". Middle East Policy. 13 (3) (2nd ed.): 29–87. doi:10.1111/j.1475-4967.2006.00260.x. ISSN 1061-1924. Spanish translation published as —; Walt, Stephen M. (2006). "O Lobby de Israel". Novos Estudos CEBRAP (76): 43–73. doi:10.1590/S0101-33002006000300003. eISSN 1980-5403. cite-400
  - The article was presented before the National Press Club the year of its publication. In response to widespread criticism, the authors published a response as —; Walt, Stephen M. (December 12, 2006). "Setting the Record Straight: A Response to Critics of "The Israel Lobby"" (PDF).
- — (2008). "Rivalry in the Offing" (PDF). China Security. 4 (2): 9–10. ISSN 1935-5564.
- — (2008). "The US Should Act as an Honest Broker" (PDF). Palestine-Israel Journal. 15 (1–2): 147–152. ISSN 0793-1395.
- —; Walt, Stephen M. (February 12, 2009). "Is it love or the lobby? Explaining America's special relationship with Israel". Security Studies. 18 (1): 58–78. doi:10.1080/09636410802678031. eISSN 1556-1852.
- —; Walt, Stephen M. (May 15, 2009). "The Blind Man and the Elephant in the Room: Robert Lieberman and the Israel Lobby". Perspectives on Politics. 7 (2): 259–273. doi:10.1017/S1537592709090781. ISSN 1537-5927.
- — (June 24, 2009). "Reckless States and Realism" (PDF). International Relations. 23 (2): 241–256. doi:10.1177/0047117809104637. ISSN 0047-1178.
- — (2010). "Why is Europe Peaceful Today" (PDF). European Political Science. 9 (3): 387–397. doi:10.1057/eps.2010.24. eISSN 1682-0983.
- — (December 8, 2010). "Gathering Storm: China's Challenge to US Power in Asia" (PDF). The Chinese Journal of International Politics. 3 (4): 381–396. doi:10.1093/cjip/poq016.
- — (2011). "Realists as Idealists" (PDF). Security Studies. 20 (3): 424–430. doi:10.1080/09636412.2011.599190. eISSN 1556-1852.
- —; Walt, Stephen M. (September 5, 2013). "Leaving theory behind: Why simplistic hypothesis testing is bad for International Relations" (PDF). European Political Science. 19 (3): 427–457. doi:10.1177/1354066113494320. eISSN 1682-0983.
- — (March 1, 2016). "A Global Discipline of IR? Benign Hegemony". International Studies Review. 18 (1): 147–149. doi:10.1093/isr/viv021. ISSN 1521-9488. JSTOR 24758344.
- — (2016). "Defining a New Security Architecture for Europe that Brings Russia in from the Cold". Military Review. 96 (3): 27–31. ISSN 0026-4148.
- — (2017). "The False Promise of International Institutions". International Organization. 19 (3): 5–49. doi:10.2307/2539078. ISSN 1531-5088. JSTOR 2539078.
- — (April 1, 2019). "Bound to Fail: The Rise and Fall of the Liberal International Order". International Security. 43 (4): 7–50. doi:10.1162/isec_a_00342. eISSN 1531-4804.
  - Also delivered in lecture form at the Centre for Independent Studies, which on account of being widely viewed is sometimes cited instead. John Ikenberry debated the article with Mearsheimer in 2021.
- — (July 1, 2019). "Realism and Restraint". Horizons: Journal of International Relations and Sustainable Development (14): 12–31. ISSN 2406-0402. JSTOR 48573725.
- — (2021). "Liberalism and Nationalism in Contemporary America" (PDF). PS: Political Science & Politics. 54 (1): 1–8. doi:10.1017/S1049096520001808. ISSN 1537-5935.
- — (July 1, 2022). "The Causes and Consequences of the Ukraine War" (PDF). Horizons: Journal of International Relations and Sustainable Development (21): 12–27. ISSN 2406-0402.
  - Also delivered in lecture form at The Robert Schuman Centre for Advanced Studies, sometimes cited instead on account of its over 4 million views. A transcript of the speech was published by Harvard Kennedy School's Russia Matters, with a response by national security analyst Joseph Cirincione. To that lecture, the director of the EUI, political scientist Alexander Stubb who was also the president of Finland at the time, published a critical response. Two political scientists from the same institute had already published a brief critique, mainly of his theories on the role of NATO. Another EUI political scientist followed up Stubb's video with his own critique.
- — (2023). "Cracks in the Liberal Edifice" (PDF). Military Review: 115–152. ISSN 0026-4148.
- — (May 1, 2025). "War and International Politics". International Security. 49 (4): 7–36. doi:10.1162/isec_a_00507. ISSN 0162-2889.

=== Magazine and newspaper articles ===
- — (February 8, 1991). "Liberation in Less Than a Week". The New York Times. p. A31. ISSN 0362-4331.
- — (December 28, 1991). "Opinion: Professor's Own Nazi Past Accuses Her; Apology Sought". The New York Times. p. A18. ISSN 0362-4331.
- —; Miller, Steven E. (1993). "Should Ukraine Stay Nuclear? A Debate". Foreign Affairs. Vol. 72. pp. 239–261. ISSN 0015-7120.
- — (March 31, 1993). "Shrink Bosnia to Save It". The New York Times. p. A23. ISSN 0362-4331.
- —; Pape, Robert A. (June 14, 1993). "The Answer" (PDF). The New Republic. Vol. 203. pp. 22–27. ISSN 0028-6583.
- — (1993). "The Case for a Ukrainian Nuclear Deterrent" (PDF). Foreign Affairs. pp. 50–66. ISSN 0015-7120.
- —; Van Evera, Stephen (December 18, 1995). "When Peace Means War: The partition that dare not speak its name" (PDF). The New Republic. Vol. 18. pp. 16–21. ISSN 0028-6583.
- —; Van Evera, Stephen (September 24, 1996). "Opinion: Hateful Neighbors". The New York Times. p. A25. ISSN 0362-4331.
- —; Van Evera, Stephen (September 25, 1996). "Partition is the Inevitable Solution for Bosnia". International Herald Tribune. p. 6. ISSN 0294-8052.
- — (October 7, 1997). "The Only Exit from Bosnia". The New York Times. No. 7. p. A31. ISSN 0362-4331.
- — (October 8, 1997). "Since Dayton Is Doomed, Get On With the Partition of Bosnia". International Herald Tribune. p. 10. ISSN 0294-8052.
- — (October 19, 1998). "A Peace Agreement That's Bound to Fail". The New York Times. p. A17. ISSN 0362-4331.
- —; Van Evera, Stephen (April 19, 1999). "Redraw the Map, Stop the Killing". The New York Times. No. 19. p. A23. ISSN 0362-4331.
- — (March 24, 2000). "India Needs the Bomb". The New York Times. No. 24. p. A21. ISSN 0362-4331.
- — (January 11, 2001). "The Impossible Partition". The New York Times. No. 11. p. A25. ISSN 0362-4331.
- — (November 4, 2001). "Guns Won't Win the Afghan War". The New York Times. No. 4. p. 13. ISSN 0362-4331.
- — (2001). "The Future of the American Pacifier". Foreign Affairs. Vol. 80, no. 5. p. 46. doi:10.2307/20050250. ISSN 0015-7120. JSTOR 20050250.
  - Criticised by Vojtech Mastny in a letter to Foreign Affairs.
- — (2002). "Hearts and Minds". The National Interest. No. 69. pp. 13–16. ISSN 0884-9382.
- — (February 8, 2002). "Liberal Talk, Realist Thinking". University of Chicago Magazine. Vol. 94, no. 3. pp. 24–38. ISSN 0041-9508.
- —; Walt, Stephen M. (2003). "An Unnecessary War" (PDF). Foreign Policy. pp. 50–59. ISSN 0015-7228.
- —; Walt, Stephen M. (February 2, 2003). "Keeping Saddam Hussein in a Box" (PDF). The New York Times. No. 2. p. 54. ISSN 0362-4331. cite-57
- — (2005). "Better to be Godzilla than Bambi". Foreign Policy. No. 146. pp. 47–48. ISSN 0015-7228. JSTOR 30048171.
- — (2005). "Showing the United States the Door". Foreign Policy. No. 146. p. 49. ISSN 0015-7228. JSTOR 30048173.
- — (2005). "It's Not a Pretty Picture". Foreign Policy. No. 146. p. 50. ISSN 0015-7228. JSTOR 30048175.
- — (May 18, 2005). "Hans Morgenthau and the Iraq war: realism versus neo-conservatism". openDemocracy. eISSN 1476-5888.
- — (November 18, 2005). "The Rise of China Will not be Peaceful at All" (PDF). The Australian. Vol. 18, no. 11. ISSN 1038-8761.
  - Not to be confused with its dlivery in the form of a lecture at the University of Ottawa, widely viewed.
- —; Walt, Stephen M. (2006). "Unrestricted Access: What the Israel Lobby Wants, It Too Often Gets". Foreign Policy. No. 155. pp. 57–58. ISSN 0015-7228. JSTOR 25462064.
- — (December 30, 2008). "Pull Those Boots off the Ground". Newsweek. p. 334. ISSN 0028-9604.
- — (May 18, 2009). "Saving Israel From Itself". The American Conservative. ISSN 1540-966X.
- — (December 4, 2009). "How Afghanistan went from good war to bad". Newsweek. ISSN 0028-9604. Archived from the original on November 22, 2013.
- —; Brzezinski, Zbigniew (October 22, 2009). "Clash of the Titans". Foreign Policy. No. 146. pp. 46–47.
- — (November 2, 2009). "Hollow Victory". Foreign Policy. No. 2. ISSN 0015-7228.
- — (2010). "Afghanistan: No More the Good War" (PDF). Newsweek. ISSN 0028-9604.
- — (August 2010). "Sinking Ship" (PDF). The American Conservative. pp. 10–12. ISSN 1540-966X.
- — (October 29, 2010). "Australians should fear the rise of China" (PDF). The Spectator. No. 2. ISSN 0038-6952.
- — (November 1, 2010). "The Best and the Brightest". Foreign Affairs. Vol. 89, no. 6. p. 201. ISSN 0015-7120.
- — (2011). "Imperial by Design" (PDF). The National Interest. No. 111. pp. 16–34. ISSN 0884-9382.
  - Delivered as a lecture at The University of Chicago, sometimes cited instead. It was also delivered before Carleton University.
- — (2014). "America Unhinged" (PDF). The National Interest. No. 129. pp. 9–30. ISSN 0884-9382.
- — (2014). "Why the Ukraine Crisis Is the West's Fault: The Liberal Delusions That Provoked Putin" (PDF). Foreign Affairs. Vol. 93, no. 5. pp. 77–89. ISSN 0015-7120.
  - A lecture he delivered on this article was viewed over 30 million times on YouTube. Critiqued by historian Jeff Rich.
- — (2014). "The Burden of Irresponsibility". The National Interest. No. 129. ISSN 0884-9382.
- — (February 25, 2014). "Say Goodbye to Taiwan". The National Interest. ISSN 0884-9382.
- — (March 1, 2014). "Taiwan's Dire Straits" (PDF). The National Interest. No. 130. pp. 29–39. ISSN 0884-9382.
- — (March 13, 2014). "Getting Ukraine Wrong". The New York Times. ISSN 0362-4331.
- — (2014). "How the West Caused the Ukraine Crisis". Foreign Affairs. Vol. 93, no. 5. ISSN 0015-7120.
- — (October 17, 2014). "Faulty Powers: Who Started the Ukraine Crisis?". Foreign Affairs. Vol. 93, no. 6. pp. 167–178. ISSN 0015-7120.
  - Criticised by Michael McFaul and Stephen Sestanovich in the same edition, including a response from Mearsheimer. Their criticism was in turn critiqued by Susan Eisenhower.
- — (October 25, 2014). "Can China Rise Peacefully?". The National Interest. Vol. 25, no. 1. pp. 1–40. ISSN 0884-9382.
  - Delivered in lecture format before the Jefferson Literary and Debating Society, the University of Chicago and Reed College. Critiqued by historian Jeff Rich.
- — (February 9, 2015). "Don't Arm Ukraine". The New York Times. ISSN 0362-4331.
- —; Walt, Stephen M. (June 13, 2016). "The Case for Offshore Balancing: A Superior US Grand Strategy". Foreign Affairs. Vol. 95. ISSN 0015-7120.
- —; Walt, Stephen M. (April 1, 2019). "The Influence of AIPAC". The New York Times. ISSN 0362-4331.
- — (July 1, 2019). "Iran Is Rushing to Build a Nuclear Weapon — and Trump Can't Stop It". The New York Times. ISSN 0362-4331.
- — (December 29, 2020). "Joe Biden Must Embrace Liberal Nationalism to Lead America Forward". Russia Matters. Belfer Center for Science and International Affairs. Originally published in The National Interest.
- — (October 19, 2021). "The Inevitable Rivalry: America, China, and the Tragedy of Great-Power Politics". Foreign Affairs. Vol. 100. ISSN 0015-7120.
  - Criticised by John Ikenberry, Andrew J. Nathan, Susan Thornton and Sun Zhe, with a response by Mearsheimer.
- — (March 19, 2022). "John Mearsheimer on why the West is principally responsible for the Ukrainian crisis". The Economist. ISSN 0013-0613.
- — (June 23, 2022). "The Causes and Consequences of the Ukraine Crisis". The National Interest. ISSN 0884-9382. Originally presented as — (June 4, 2015). The Causes and Consequences of the Ukraine Crisis. UChicago Alumni Weekend 2015.
- — (August 17, 2022). "Playing With Fire in Ukraine: The Underappreciated Risks of Catastrophic Escalation". Foreign Affairs. ISSN 0015-7120.
- —; Rosato, Sebastian (December 12, 2023). "Essence of Decision Making". Foreign Affairs. Vol. 103. ISSN 0015-7120.
- —; Rosato, Sebastian (January 1, 2024). "Essence of Decision Making". Foreign Affairs. Vol. 103, no. 1. pp. 173–177. ISSN 0015-7120.
- Released as a lecture.

== Books ==
- Conventional Deterrence. Cornell Studies in Security Affairs. Cornell University Press. 1983. ISBN 0801415691.
  - An influential book within the United States Army. Positively reviewed by George E. Orr, but less positively by David Calleo. Reviewed by Jed Snyder in 1985. It became a combat textbook. As a standard reference, it has been extensively employed in works by Corbin Williamson, Philip J. Romero, and others.
- Liddell Hart and the Weight of History. Cornell Studies in Security Affairs. Cornell University Press. 1988. ISBN 080142089X. OCLC 17953067.
  - Positively reviewed for its historical insight by John Paret for the Atlantic. Also reviewed by the Economist, and the Sewanee Review.
- The Tragedy of Great Power Politics. W.W. Norton & Company. 2001. ISBN 0393020258. OCLC 46678382.
  - Positively reviewed as a realist primer by James R. Holmes for the Library Journal and by the Publishers Weekly. Also reviewed by Patricia Cohen for the New York Times.
- The Israel Lobby and U.S. Foreign Policy. Farrar, Straus and Giroux. 2007. ISBN 978-0374177720. OCLC 144227359.
  - The book received mixed reviews, prompting the authors to respond with an article in Prospect, Jonathan Mirsky and Paul Findley responded to the criticism with positive reviews, while David Remnick though critical of the book defended the subject of the book as a serious scholarly topic. Also reviewed by Bret Stephens, Leslie H. Gelb, Dan Johnson, James Abourezk, L. Carl Brown, Booklist, Middle East Policy, the Economist, New Statesman, Publishers Weekly, the Guardian. After the initial presentation of the Prospect article, it was presented as a lecture before the Council for the National Interest, Code Pink, the GBH Forum Network, the Center for International and Regional Studies, and most prominently at the University of Chicago, sometimes cited instead of the book Bruce Feiler debated Mearsheimer on the book in 2018.
- Why Leaders Lie: The Truth About Lying in International Politics. Oxford University Press. 2011. ISBN 9780199758739. OCLC 593639329.
  - It grew out of the material from a 2010 lecture at the Centre for International Governance Innovation. The book itself was presented as a lecture viewed over 6 million times on YouTube.
- The Great Delusion: Liberal Dreams and International Realities. Yale University Press. 2018. ISBN 978-0300234190.
- Mearsheimer, John J.; Rosato, Sebastian (2023). How States Think: The Rationality of Foreign Policy. Yale University Press. ISBN 9780300269307.
  - Ashley J. Tellis debated Mearsheimer on the book in 2023. The book was reviewed by Christoph Rohde.

=== Contributions ===
- — (1979). "Realism, the real world, and the academy". In Brecher, Michael; Harvey, Frank (eds.). Millennial Reflections on International Studies. University of Michigan Press. pp. 57–64. doi:10.3998/mpub.17045. ISBN 0472112732. JSTOR 10.3998/mpub.17045.
- —; Hardin, Russell (1985). "Introduction". Ethics. 95 (3): 411–423. doi:10.1086/292651. ISSN 0014-1704. Republished in — (1985). Nuclear Deterrence, Ethics and Strategy. University of Chicago Press. ISBN 0226317021.
- — (1992). "Disorder Restored". Rethinking America's Security: Beyond Cold War to New World Order. Norton. pp. 213–137. ISBN 0393962180.
- — (April 7, 1994). "Instability in Europe After the Cold War". War. Oxford Readers. ISBN 9780192892546.
- — (October 12, 1998). "The Future of America's Continental Commitment". No End to Alliance (The United States and Western Europe: Past, Present and Future). pp. 221–242. doi:10.1007/978-1-349-26959-4_11. ISBN 978-0-333-74080-4.
- — (2000). "The Case for Partitioning Kosovo". NATO's Empty Victory: A Postmortem on the Balkan War. Cato Institute. pp. 133–138. ISBN 188257785X.
- — (2002). "Realism, the Real World, and the Academy". In Brecher, Michael; Harvey, Frank P. (eds.). Realism and Institutionalism in International Studies. The University of Michigan Press. pp. 23–33. ISBN 1-282-44458-1.
- — (2004). "Hitler and the Blitzkrieg Strategy". The Use of Force: Military Power and International Politics (6th ed.). Rowman & Littlefield. pp. 130–144. ISBN 0742525570.
- Mazur, G. O., ed. (2004). One Hundred Year Commemoration to the Life of Hans Morgenthau (1904-2004). Semenenko Foundation.
- — (2005). "Strategies for Survival". Perspectives on World Politics (3rd ed.). Taylor and Francis. pp. 69–79. ISBN 9780415322768.
- Dunne, Tim; Kurki, Milja; Smith, Steve, eds. (2006). International Relations Theories: Discipline and Diversity. Oxford University Press.
- — (February 18, 2011). "The War on Terrorism". Security Studies. Routledge. pp. 422–426. ISBN 9780415326018.
- — (2013). "Structural Realism". International Relations Theories: Discipline and Diversity (PDF). Oxford University Press. pp. 77–93. ISBN 9780198707561.
  - Because it was widely viewed, some sources cite the lecture instead: Mearsheimer, John J. (October 3, 2014). Structural Realism. International Relations. Open University – via YouTube. 9:21.
- — (August 12, 2014). "Anarchy and the Struggle for Power". The Realism Reader (PDF). Routledge. pp. 179–187. ISBN 9780415773577.
- — (July 29, 2015). "Preface". Routledge Handbook of Latin American Security (1st ed.). pp. x–xi. ISBN 9781315867908.
- — (September 16, 2015). "Why We Will Soon Miss the Cold War". Conflict after the Cold War (PDF). Routledge. pp. 28–44. ISBN 9781032010083.
- — (December 31, 2015). "Israel and Academic Freedom". Who's Afraid of Academic Freedom?. Columbia University Press. pp. 316–333. ISBN 9780231168816.
- Shapiro, Ian; Smith, Rogers M.; Masoud, Tarek E. (eds.). Problems and Methods in the Study of Politics. Cambridge University Press.

=== Book reviews ===
- — (June 1990). "John Lehman's Command". The US Army War College Quarterly: Parameters. 20 (2): 13–16. doi:10.55540/0031-1723.1564. ISSN 0031-1723.
  - Review of Lehman, John Francis Jr. (1988). Command of the Seas. Scribner. ISBN 068418995X.
- — (1998). "Review: Political Realism in International Theory". The International History Review. 20 (3): 776–778. ISSN 0707-5332. JSTOR 40101400.
  - Review of Spegele, Roger D. (1996). Political Realism in International Theory. Cambridge University Press. ISBN 9780511586392.
- — (September 1, 2001). "Kissinger's Wisdom and Advice". The National Interest. pp. 123–128. ISSN 0884-9382.
  - Review of Kissinger, Henry Alfred (2001). Does America Need A Foreign Policy?: Toward a Diplomacy for the 21st Century. New York: Simon & Schuster. ISBN 0684855674.
- — (2013). "Has Violence Declined in World Politics?" (PDF). Perspectives on Politics. 11 (2): 570–573. doi:10.1017/S1537592713000170. ISSN 1537-5927.
  - Review of Goldstein, Joshua S. (2011). Winning the War on War: The Decline of Armed Conflict Worldwide. Penguin Publishing. ISBN 9780525952534.

== Lectures ==
- — (May 5, 2011). Kissing Cousins: Nationalism and Realism (PDF). Yale Workshop on International Relations. pp. 1–44.
- — (June 24, 2011). "Sister Camilla and the Anarchic Schoolyard: A Memo on the Logic of Offensive Realism" (PDF). Mearsheimer.com. Originally delivered as a lecture.
- — (November 24, 2011). The Relevance of Realism in the 21st Century: Keynote Speech. IntRpol – via YouTube. Part 1 33:93. Part 2 32:43.
- — (August 8, 2012) [recorded 2010-04-29]. The Future of Palestine: Righteous Jews vs the New Afrikaners. The Jerusalem Fund – via YouTube. 1:03:04.
- — (January 20, 2013) [recorded 2012-12-11]. The Honorary Patronage of John Mearsheimer: The Future of the Trans-Atlantic Alliance. University Philosophical Society – via YouTube. 49:11.
- — (April 11, 2013). The Future of American Landpower. United States Army War College. 1:20:38.
- — (May 8, 2013). The Rise of China and the Decline of the US Army. U.S. Army War College XXIV Annual Strategy Conference.
- — (June 10, 2014). The Rise of Asia?. Chicago Access Network Television – via YouTube. 1:57:10.
- — (August 27, 2016). Vietnam and America: John Mearsheimer Explains Vietnam and America. Max Mearsheimer – via YouTube. 1:11:29. A talk with his son.
- — (November 1, 2016). Offensive Realism in explaining the current and future US-China relations. Moscow State Institute of International Relations – via YouTube. 1:50:19.
- — (March 28, 2017) [recorded 2017-03-24]. Changes in the Israel Lobby. Washington Report on Middle East Affairs – via YouTube. 42:54.
- — (June 30, 2017). On the World Order. Dialogue of Civilizations – via YouTube.
- — (November 22, 2017). The Roots of Liberal Hegemony. Henry L. Stimson Lectures on World Affairs. Yale University – via YouTube. 53:33.
- — (November 22, 2017). The False Promise of Liberal Hegemony. Henry L. Stimson Lectures on World Affairs. Yale University – via YouTube. 1:23:42.
- — (April 17, 2018) [recorded 2018-04-13]. American International Relations Theory: Its Influence at Home and Abroad. The Danish Foreign Policy Society – via YouTube. 1:47:12.
- — (November 5, 2018) [recorded 2018-10-31]. The Future of NATO in the Age of Trump. Romania Energy Center – via YouTube. 1:59:00.
- — (March 21, 2019). Theory and Practice of Security Conference: Keynote. Georgetown University Center for Security Studies – via YouTube. 1:16:56.
- — (August 7, 2019). The liberal international order. Centre for Independent Studies – via YouTube. 54:15.
- — (December 5, 2022). Great Power Politics in the 21st Century & The Implications for Hungary. Századvég Alapítvány – via YouTube. 1:47:21.
- — (May 24, 2023) [presented 2023-05-22]. Where is the Ukraine War Going?. Committee for the Republic – via YouTube. 1:33:46.
- — (October 30, 2023). Israel-Hamas, Ukraine-Russia and China: John Mearsheimer on why the US is in serious trouble!. Centre for Independent Studies – via YouTube.
  - Rereleased as Why Israel is in deep trouble. Centre for Independent Studies. May 17, 2024 – via YouTube. 46:77. Niall Ferguson gave a rebuttal talk the following year.
- — (February 13, 2024). War and International Politics: John Mearsheimer. 2023-24 NDISC Seminar Series. NDISC – via YouTube. 1:30:40.
- — (February 27, 2025). Israel and Nuclear Weapons: A Talk with John Mearsheimer. The Social Sciences Division of the Chicago Forum Student Advisory Board. The Chicago Forum for Free Inquiry and Expression – via YouTube. 1:28:17.
- — (May 31, 2025) [recorded 2025-03-18]. Liberal Hegemony and the Present Crisis in U.S. Foreign Policy. Agora Speakers Series. Swarthmore Conservative Studies – via YouTube. 1:46:11.
- — (November 17, 2025) [delivered 2025-11-11]. Europe's Bleak Future. The American Conservative – via YouTube. 1:48:27. Before the European Parliament at the conference Europe at the Crossroads: Which Way Forward in Ukraine? hosted by Patriots for Europe, who published the original video on 2025-11-14. Transcript (TAC). Other transcripts published.
