= John Mearsheimer =

American political scientist (born 1947)

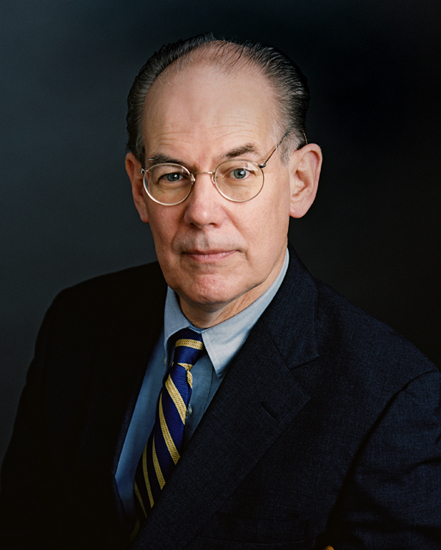
- Mearsheimer in 2007
- Born: John Joseph Mearsheimer; December 14, 1947 (age 78); New York City, U.S.

Education
- Education: United States Military Academy (BS); University of Southern California (MA); Cornell University (MA, PhD)

Philosophical work
- School: Neorealism
- Institutions: University of Chicago
- Main interests: International relations theory, international security, deterrence theory
- Notable works: "Why the Soviets Can't Win Quickly in Central Europe" (1982); Conventional Deterrence (1983); The Tragedy of Great Power Politics (2001); The Israel Lobby and U.S. Foreign Policy (2007); Why Leaders Lie: The Truth About Lying in International Politics (2011); The Great Delusion: Liberal Dreams and International Realities (2018)
- Notable ideas: Offensive realism
- Website: mearsheimer.com

John Joseph Mearsheimer (/ˈmɪərʃaɪmər/; born December 14, 1947) is an American political scientist and international relations scholar and professor at the University of Chicago.

He developed the neorealist (or structural realist) theory of offensive realism, which describes the interaction between great powers as being dictated by the state's motives for self preservation and the rational desire to achieve (or maintain) regional hegemony in an anarchic international system. In accordance with his theory Mearsheimer says that China's growing power may lead to a conflict with the United States (as laid down in his 2001 book The Tragedy of Great Power Politics).

In his 2007 book The Israel Lobby and U.S. Foreign Policy, Mearsheimer argues that the Israel lobby wields disproportionate influence over U.S. foreign policy in the Middle East. In a 2014 article, Mearsheimer wrote why he believes that the West is to blame for the Russo-Ukrainian War. In his 2018 book The Great Delusion: Liberal Dreams and International Realities he has criticized the "liberal international order".

== Early life and education ==
Mearsheimer was born on December 14, 1947, in Brooklyn, New York City as one of five children to Thomas Joseph Mearsheimer (1918–2007) and Ruth Margaret Baumann Mearsheimer (1922–2011), in a family of German and Irish descent. His father was a civil engineer and a colonel in the United States Air Force Reserve. As a United States Military Academy (USMA) graduate, his father served in the United States Army Air Corps during WWII, and with the Air Force Reserve during the Korean and Vietnam Wars. As a civil engineer, he worked for various railroads and was the chief engineer of the Grand Central.

When he was eight, Mearsheimer moved with his family to the village of Croton-on-Hudson, New York, a suburb in Westchester County, New York. When he was 17, he enlisted in the United States Army. After one year as an enlisted man, he obtained an appointment to USMA at West Point, New York, which he attended from 1966 to 1970. Receiving a Bachelor of Science degree from the USMA in 1970, Mearsheimer served five years from 1970 to 1975 in the United States Air Force, rising from a second lieutenant to the rank of a captain before resigning. He married Mary T. Cobb in 1970 with whom he has three children, a daughter and two sons.

In 1974, while in the Air Force, Mearsheimer earned a Master of Arts in international relations from the University of Southern California. Not satisfied with his career at the United States military, he resigned from the Air Force and pursued further graduate studies at Cornell University in Ithaca, New York, earning a Master of Arts and a Ph.D. in government in 1978 and 1981, respectively. His Ph.D. dissertation was titled "The theory and practice of conventional deterrence." He concentrated his studies in international relations with a peace studies fellowship from Cornell from 1978 to 1979. In the summer of 1978, he interned at the Arms Control and Disarmament Agency. From 1979 to 1980, he was a research fellow at the Brookings Institution in Washington, D.C., having received a Hubert H. Humphrey doctoral fellowship. From 1980 to 1982, Mearsheimer was a postdoctoral fellow (research associate) at Harvard University's Center for International Affairs.

== Career ==
Since 1982, Mearsheimer has been a member of the faculty of the Department of Political Science at the Social Science Division at the University of Chicago. He was appointed as assistant professor in 1982, as associate professor in 1984, and as full professor in 1987. He served as chair of the Department of Political Science from 1989 to 1992. He was appointed the R. Wendell Harrison Distinguished Service Professor of Political Science in 1996. He also holds a position as a faculty member in the Committee on International Relations graduate program, and he is a co-director of the Program on International Security Policy. He is also a member of the American Political Science Association and served as the co-chairman of its Commission on History, Social Science and International Security Affairs from 1987 to 1990.

Mearsheimer is a member of the editorial boards of the academic journals International Security, Security Studies, Joint Forces Quarterly, Journal of Transatlantic Studies, Asian Security, China Security, and International Relations.

=== Awards and honors ===
Mearsheimer's books include Conventional Deterrence (1983), which received the Edgar S. Furniss Jr. Book Award from the Mershon Center for International Security Studies; Nuclear Deterrence: Ethics and Strategy (co-editor, 1985); Liddell Hart and the Weight of History (1988); The Tragedy of Great Power Politics (2001), which won the Lepgold Book Prize; The Israel Lobby and U.S. Foreign Policy (2007), a New York Times Best Seller; and Why Leaders Lie: The Truth About Lying in International Politics (2011). Mearsheimer's work has been translated into numerous languages, including Chinese, Greek, Portuguese, Arabic, Indonesian, Polish, Spanish, and Turkish.

His articles have appeared in academic journals like International Security and popular magazines like the London Review of Books. He has written op-ed pieces for the New York Times, the Los Angeles Times, and the Chicago Tribune.

Mearsheimer has won several teaching awards. He received a grant from the American Philosophical Society in 1984 and was a George Kistiakowsky scholar at the American Academy of Arts and Sciences from 1986 to 1987. He received the Clark Award for Distinguished Teaching when he was a graduate student at Cornell in 1977, and he won the Quantrell Award for Excellence in Undergraduate Teaching at the University of Chicago in 1985; Morris Abrams Award in International Relations, 1980; in addition, he was selected as a Phi Beta Kappa Visiting Scholar for the 1993–1994 academic year. In that capacity, he gave a series of talks at eight colleges and universities. During the 1998–1999 academic year, he was the Whitney H. Shepardson Fellow at the Council on Foreign Relations in New York City.

In 2003, Mearsheimer was elected as a member of the American Academy of Arts and Sciences. He is the recipient of the American Political Science Association's 2020 James Madison Award, which is presented every three years to an American political scientist who has made distinguished scholarly contributions. The Award Committee noted that Mearsheimer is "one of the most cited International Relations scholars in the discipline, but his works are read well beyond the academy as well." Mearsheimer has been listed as a noteworthy political scientist by Marquis Who's Who and Encyclopædia Britannica describes him as a "a prominent American scholar of international relations best known for his theory of offensive realism". A 2017 survey of U.S. international relations faculty ranks him third among "scholars whose work has had the greatest influence on the field of International Relations in the past 20 years."

== Research and major publications ==
Mearsheimer popularized the term rollback to describe the geopolitical strategy of inciting unrest in a rival country while supporting government change covertly or overtly.

=== Conventional Deterrence ===
Mearsheimer's first book, Conventional Deterrence (1983), discusses the concept of how the decision to start a war depends on the projected outcome of the war, in other words, how the decision makers' beliefs about the outcome of the war affect the success or failure of deterrence. Mearsheimer's basic argument is that deterrence is likely to work when the potential attacker believes that an attack will be costly and is unlikely to succeed. However, if the potential attacker has reason to believe the attack will entail low costs and is likely to succeed, deterrence is likely to break down, which is now widely accepted to be how the principle of deterrence works. Specifically, Mearsheimer argues that the success of deterrence is determined by the strategy available to the potential attacker. He lays out three strategies. Firstly, an attrition strategy entails a high level of uncertainty about the outcome of war and high costs for the attacker. Secondly, a limited-aims strategy entails fewer risks and lower costs. Thirdly, a blitzkrieg strategy provides a way to defeat the enemy rapidly and decisively with relatively low costs. For Mearsheimer, failures in the modern battlefield are caused mostly by the potential attacker's belief that it can successfully implement a blitzkrieg strategy in which tanks and other mechanized forces are employed swiftly to cause deep penetration and to disrupt the enemy's rear. The two other strategies are unlikely to lead to deterrence failures because they entail a low probability of success, accompanied by high costs (attrition warfare) or limited gains and the possibility of the conflict turning into a war of attrition (limited aims). However, if the attacker has a coherent blitzkrieg strategy available, an attack is likely to ensue because its potential benefits outweigh the costs and risks of starting a war.

Besides analyzing cases from World War II and the Arab–Israeli conflict, Mearsheimer's 1983 book extrapolates implications from his theory for the prospects of conventional deterrence in Central Europe during the late Cold War. In the chapter "Why the Soviets Can't Win Quickly in Central Europe" (originally published in 1982 as an article in International Security) argues that a Soviet attack is unlikely because the Soviet military would be unable to successfully implement a blitzkrieg strategy. The book argues that the balance of forces, the difficulty of advancing rapidly with mechanized forces through Central Europe, and the formidable NATO forces opposing such a Soviet attack results in low chances for the Soviets to start a conventional war in Europe.

=== Liddell Hart and the Weight of History ===
Mearsheimer's second book, Liddell Hart and the Weight of History (1988), gives reassessments of the intellectual legacies of the 20th century British military theorist B. H. Liddell Hart.

Mearsheimer's arguments about Liddell Hart generated varied responses. For example, the founder of the Israel Defense Forces Operational Theory Research Institute, Simon Naveh, concurred in a separate study, which found that "by distorting the actual historical circumstances of the Blitzkrieg formation [Liddell Hart] obscured its temporal and cognitive origins.... The early-1950s display of the transformed version of Blitzkrieg as a historical fact, carrying the joint signature of Liddell Hart and Guderian, lent it an authentic touch and a professional legitimacy that could not be shaken." In contrast, Richard Swain of the US Army Command and General Staff College argued that while "there is a good deal about which Mearsheimer is correct," he likely overstates the extent to which Liddell Hart's historical distortions were consciously self-serving: "To charge Liddell Hart with cleverly creating a deception requires one first to accept that Liddell Hart knew he had been wrong. There is little or no evidence of that."

=== "The False Promise of International Institutions" ===
In a widely cited 1994 article, "The False Promise of International Institutions", Mearsheimer writes on popular arguments about the ability of institutions to discourage war and promote peace among states. In a response article, neoliberal institutionalist scholars Robert Keohane and Lisa Martin acknowledge that seminal institutionalist works tended to neglect the problem of relative gains but state that the debate spawned by realist challenges "has made distributional and bargaining issues more salient than they were in early neoliberal thinking."

=== Offensive realism ===
Mearsheimer is regarded as the leading proponent of the neorealist theory of offensive realism. The structural theory, unlike the classical realism of Hans Morgenthau, places the principal emphasis on security competition among great powers within the anarchy of the international system, not on the human nature of statesmen and diplomats. In contrast to another structural realist theory, the defensive realism of Kenneth Waltz (the founder of neorealism), offensive realism maintains that states are not satisfied with a given amount of power but seek hegemony for security because the anarchic makeup of the international system creates strong incentives for states to seek opportunities to gain power at the expense of competitors.

Mearsheimer dismisses democratic peace theory, which claims that democracies never or rarely go to war with each other, and considers it not possible for a state to become a global hegemon: although that is theoretically possible, there is too much landmass and too many oceans, which he posits as having effective stopping power and acting as giant moats. Instead, he believes that states can achieve only regional hegemony.

He also argues that once established as regional hegemon in its own neighborhood, a state will be free to roam and may go on to adopt a role as offshore balancer in other regions, attempting to prevent other states from achieving hegemony in their own regions since such peer competitors would also be free to roam and thus could interfere in its own neighborhood.

Mearsheimer's theory of offensive realism predicts that the United States, having achieved hegemony in the New World region, will act as offshore balancer, interfering in other regions, if the great powers in those regions cannot prevent the rise of a hegemon there. It has become a popular explanation of the American strategic approach in resisting China, as a growing superpower that might one day unseat America's dominant position.

=== Persian Gulf War ===
In January and early February 1991, Mearsheimer published two op-eds in the Chicago Tribune and the New York Times and argued that the war to liberate Kuwait from Iraqi forces would be quick and lead to a decisive U.S. victory, with less than 1,000 American casualties. Mearsheimer's argument was based on several points. Firstly, the Iraqi Army was a Third World military that was unprepared to fight mobile armored battles. Secondly, U.S. armored forces were better equipped and trained. Thirdly, U.S. artillery was also far better than its Iraqi counterpart. Fourthly, U.S. airpower, unfettered by the weak Iraqi air force, should prove devastating against Iraqi ground forces. Fifthly and finally, the forward deployment of Iraqi reserves boded ill for their ability to counter U.S. efforts to penetrate the Iraqi defense line along the Saudi–Kuwaiti border. All of those predictions came true during the course of the war.

=== The Israel Lobby and U.S. Foreign Policy ===
In March 2006, Mearsheimer and Stephen Walt, the former academic dean and professor of international relations at the Harvard Kennedy School, published a working paper, as well as a London Review of Books article, discussing the power of the Israel lobby shaping the U.S. foreign policy.

They define the Israel lobby as "a loose coalition of individuals and organizations who actively work to steer U.S. foreign policy in a pro-Israel direction." They state that it is not appropriate to label it a "Jewish lobby" because not all Jews feel a strong attachment to Israel, and because some of the individuals and groups who work to foster U.S. support for Israel are not Jewish. For example, Christian Zionists also play an important role. Finally, they emphasize that the lobby is not a cabal or a conspiracy but simply a powerful interest group, like the National Rifle Association of America or the farm lobby. Their core argument is that the policies pushed by the lobby are not in the national interest of the U.S. or ultimately of Israel.

The book generated extensive media coverage and led to a wide-ranging and often heated debate, including charges of antisemitism, between supporters and opponents of their argument. The article was subsequently turned into a book, The Israel Lobby and U.S. Foreign Policy. Mearsheimer and Walt also contend in the book that the US-Israel alliance skews U.S. foreign policy in Israel's favor, often at the expense of regional stability in the Middle East.

==== Statements on Israeli wars and Palestinian statehood ====
Mearsheimer was critical of the 2006 Lebanon War. He argued that Israel's strategy was "doomed to fail" because it was based on the "faulty assumption" that Israeli air power could defeat Hezbollah, which was essentially a guerrilla force. The war, he argued, was a disaster for the Lebanese people, as well as a "major setback" for the United States and Israel. He said that the Israel lobby played a key role in enabling Israel's counterproductive response by preventing the U.S. from exercising independent influence. Mearsheimer was also critical of Israel's offensive against Hamas in the Gaza Strip that began in December 2008. He argued that it would not eliminate Hamas's capability to fire missiles and rockets at Israel and that it would not cause Hamas to end its fight with Israel. In fact, he argued that relations between Israel and the Palestinians were likely to get worse in the years ahead.

Mearsheimer emphasizes that the only hope for Israel to end its conflict with the Palestinians is to end the occupation and to allow the Palestinians to have their own state in Gaza and the West Bank; otherwise, he said, Israel would turn itself into an "apartheid state", a disastrous outcome for Israel, the United States, and especially for the Palestinians. Mearsheimer's criticisms of Israel further extended to its possession of nuclear weapons. In remarks made at the International Spy Museum in 2010, Mearsheimer asserted that a nuclear Israel was contrary to U.S. interests and questioned Israel's accountability in the matter. He stated that there was "no accountability for Israel on any issue" because he surmised, "The Israelis can do almost anything and get away with it."

==== "The Future of Palestine" ====
In April 2010, Mearsheimer delivered the Hisham B. Sharabi Memorial Lecture at the Palestine Center in Washington, D.C., which he titled "The Future of Palestine: Righteous Jews vs. the New Afrikaners." He argued that "the two-state solution is now a fantasy" because Israel will incorporate the Gaza Strip and the West Bank into a "Greater Israel", which would become an apartheid state. According to Mearsheimer, such a state would not be politically viable, most American Jews would not support it, and it would eventually become a democratic binational state politically dominated by its Palestinian majority.

He suggested that "American Jews who care deeply about Israel" could be divided into three categories: the "new Afrikaners", who will support Israel even if it is an apartheid state; "righteous Jews", who believe that individual rights are universal and apply equally to Jews and Palestinians; and the largest group, which he called the "great ambivalent middle". He concluded that most of the "great ambivalent middle" would not defend an apartheid Israel because "American Jews are among the staunchest defenders of traditional liberal values." Accordingly, the "new Afrikaners" would become increasingly marginalized over time.

Mearsheimer stated that he "would classify most of the individuals who head the Israel lobby's major organizations as "'new Afrikaners'" and specifically listed a number of prominent Jews and Jewish organizations, including Abraham Foxman of the Anti-Defamation League, David Harris of the American Jewish Committee, Malcolm Hoenlein of the Conference of Presidents of Major American Jewish Organizations, Ronald Lauder of the World Jewish Congress, and Morton Klein of the Zionist Organization of America, as well as businessmen such as Sheldon Adelson, Lester Crown, and Mortimer Zuckerman and "media personalities" like Fred Hiatt, Charles Krauthammer, Bret Stephens, and Martin Peretz.

==== The Wandering Who? ====
In 2011, John Mearsheimer wrote a back-cover blurb for controversial author Gilad Atzmon's book The Wandering Who? A Study of Jewish Identity Politics: "Gilad Atzmon has written a fascinating and provocative book on Jewish identity in the modern world. He shows how assimilation and liberalism are making it increasingly difficult for Jews in the Diaspora to maintain a powerful sense of their Jewishness. Panicked Jewish leaders, he argues, have turned to Zionism (blind loyalty to Israel) and scaremongering (the threat of another Holocaust) to keep the tribe united and distinct from the surrounding goyim. As Atzmon's own case demonstrates, this strategy is not working and is causing many Jews great anguish. The Wandering Who? should be widely read by Jews and non-Jews alike."

Mearsheimer's endorsement of Atzmon's book was met with accusations of antisemitism by prominent Jewish writers and intellectuals. Alan Dershowitz wrote an article in response, "Why are John Mearsheimer and Richard Falk Endorsing a Blatantly Anti-Semitic Book?" He stated that the book "argues that Jews seek to control the world." Mearsheimer denied the charges of antisemitism in that he had "no reason to amend it or embellish" his blurb and defended his position. Responding to the charge by Jeffrey Goldberg in The Atlantic that Atzmon is antisemitic and, by implication, so is his positive review of Atzmon's book, Mearsheimer wrote: "Atzmon's basic point is that Jews often talk in universalistic terms, but many of them think and act in particularistic terms. One might say they talk like liberals but act like nationalists.... It is in this context that he discusses what he calls the 'Holocaust religion,' Zionism, and Israel's treatment of the Palestinians. Again, to be perfectly clear, he has no animus toward Judaism as a religion or with individuals who are Jewish by birth."

=== Rise and containment of China ===
Mearsheimer asserts that China's rise will not be peaceful, and that the U.S. will seek to contain China and to prevent it from achieving regional hegemony. Mearsheimer argues that although containing China militarily is possible, economic containment of China is not. Mearsheimer believes that China will attempt to dominate the Indo-Pacific region just as the U.S. set out to dominate the Western Hemisphere. China's goal will be to gain a position of military superiority over its neighbors, which it sees as potentially dangerous threats. Additionally, he states that the U.S. will attempt to form a balancing coalition that consists primarily of India, Japan, the Philippines, South Korea, Vietnam, and Indonesia to counter the growing strength and power projection capabilities of China.

In a 2015 review of Mearsheimer's arguments on China, the sociologist Amitai Etzioni charged that the two powers "have very little 'real' reason to confront each other" and that the "main value of Mearsheimer's provocative thesis is that it alerts those of us on both sides of the power divide to redouble our efforts to prevent his dire predictions from coming true." By contrast, Executive Director Tom Switzer of the Sydney-based Centre for Independent Studies opined in May 2020, "Rarely in history has an academic been as intellectually vindicated as John Mearsheimer, [He] accurately foresaw the intense Sino-American security competition that the coronavirus crisis has exposed."

In the early 2000s, after Mearsheimer argued in The Tragedy of Great Power Politics that China could not rise peacefully, he was invited by Chinese policymakers and academics to give talks in the country. Having attained stardom in China, he told the New Statesman in 2023: "When I go to Beijing, I feel more at home intellectually, and in terms of thinking about foreign policy, than I am in Washington. The Chinese are realists to the core." Mearsheimer notes that Chinese interlocutors often challenge him on his assertion of China's unpeaceful rise, with some political scientists citing economic interdependence theory or Confucianism to dispute his realist views.

=== Why Leaders Lie ===
Mearsheimer wrote a book, Why Leaders Lie (Oxford University Press, 2011), which analyzes lying in international politics. His two main findings are that leaders actually do not lie very much to other countries and that democratic leaders are actually more likely than autocrats to lie to their own people.

=== Ukraine ===
==== "The Case for a Ukrainian Nuclear Deterrent" ====
When the Soviet Union ended, the newly independent Ukraine was left with a large arsenal of Soviet nuclear weapons. In his 1993 article, "The Case for a Ukrainian Nuclear Deterrent", Mearsheimer argued that Ukraine should not give up its nuclear weapons, because he believed that without a nuclear deterrent it would be subjected to Russian aggression. He proposed that the United States change its policy and enable Ukraine to become an independent nuclear power, saying "Ukrainian nuclear weapons are the only reliable deterrent to Russian aggression". Mearsheimer wrote that "Russia has dominated an unwilling and angry Ukraine for more than two centuries, and has attempted to crush Ukraine's sense of self-identity", and that some Russian officials "reject the idea of an independent Ukraine". He said that a Russian war against Ukraine might lead Russia to "reconquer other parts of the former Soviet Union". Mearsheimer opined that, if Russia attacked Ukraine, "great powers would move quickly and sharply to contain further Russian expansion".

==== "Why the Ukraine Crisis is the West's Fault" ====
Mearsheimer blamed NATO's eastern enlargement for provoking the Russo-Ukrainian War.

The Russo-Ukrainian war started in 2014. Amid the Ukrainian Revolution of Dignity, Russia occupied and annexed Crimea, taking it from Ukraine, and supported pro-Russian separatists who launched a war in eastern Ukraine. In his August 2014 article, "Why the Ukraine Crisis is the West's Fault", Mearsheimer said the United States and its European allies were mainly to blame for the conflict, stating that the root of the conflict was NATO and EU expansion to include Ukraine which Russian leaders have adamantly opposed.

Mearsheimer called Putin "a first-class strategist who should be feared and respected" on foreign policy. He argued that Putin is driven by "legitimate security concerns" and does not want to occupy the whole of Ukraine. Mearsheimer argued that Russia's annexation of Crimea was driven by fears of losing its Sevastopol Naval Base. He highlighted Russian opposition to Ukrainian NATO membership over the years, and the Western analysts who warned against it. He argued that the United States would react the same way to a rival military alliance on its border: "Imagine the American outrage if China built an impressive military alliance and tried to include Canada and Mexico". Mearsheimer says Russia's concerns about Ukraine eventually joining NATO are similar to U.S. concerns about Soviet nuclear weapons being deployed in Cuba during the 1962 Cuban Missile Crisis: "Did Cuba have the right to form a military alliance with the Soviet Union during the Cold War? The United States certainly did not think so, and the Russians think the same way about Ukraine joining the West".

Mearsheimer wrote that the U.S. and its allies have pushed for the eastward enlargement of NATO and the EU despite Russian opposition, pointing to the 2008 Bucharest summit and the 2009 Eastern Partnership initiative. He concluded that the EU and NATO "should abandon their plan to westernize Ukraine and instead aim to make it a neutral buffer state between NATO and Russia". Regarding "the claim that Ukraine has the right to determine whom it wants to ally with", Mearsheimer says "This is a dangerous way for Ukraine to think about its foreign policy choices. The sad truth is that might often makes right when great-power politics are at play".

American academics Michael McFaul and Stephen Sestanovich published their response to Mearsheimer in the November/December 2014 issue of Foreign Affairs. They argued that Russian foreign policy was not a reaction to the US, but was driven by internal Russian politics. They rejected his description of the Ukrainian revolution as a "coup", countering that "after police killed scores of demonstrators in downtown Kiev, the whole country turned against him [Yanukovych], effectively ending his political career. Parliament removed him by a unanimous vote".

In the book, War in Ukraine: Conflict, Strategy, and the Return of a Fractured World, McFaul and Robert Person criticize Mearsheimer's arguments. They write that if Putin believed NATO was a military threat, he would not have deepened co-operation in the early 2000s and again in 2010, when NATO enlargement was ongoing. They point to Putin's statements in the early 2000s, when he said Ukraine in NATO would not concern Russia. They also wrote that Ukraine's parliament only revoked its neutral status in late 2014, "after Russia had invaded Crimea and the Donbas". In their view, Putin's actions are more driven by Russian neo-imperialism.

Political scientist Filip Kostelka said Mearsheimer "ignores the fact that Ukrainians – like other Eastern Europeans – have been actively seeking NATO membership to protect themselves from the Russian threat. They did not need to be pushed". American national security expert Joe Cirincione also said that Mearsheimer ignored this, writing "America did not pull them into an anti-Russian pact". Following calls to provide weapons to Ukraine to deter Putin, Mearsheimer spoke against the idea.

==== Russian invasion of Ukraine ====
A map of the Russian invasion at its height in March 2022

On February 15, 2022, Mearsheimer argued that Putin had "no intention of invading Ukraine". When Russia invaded Ukraine a week later, Mearsheimer re-affirmed his belief that the West were largely to blame. In March 2022, he was interviewed by Isaac Chotiner of The New Yorker. Mearsheimer again blamed the invasion on "NATO expansion, EU expansion", and attempts to "turn Ukraine into a pro-American liberal democracy", arguing that "from a Russian perspective, this is an existential threat". He said Putin was not interested in conquering Ukraine and that Ukraine should "break off its close relations with the West ... and try to accommodate the Russians."

Soon after the invasion began, the Russian Ministry of Foreign Affairs endorsed Mearsheimer's view on why they invaded. American historian Anne Applebaum criticized Mearsheimer, saying "now wondering if the Russians didn't actually get their narrative from Mearsheimer et al. Moscow needed to say the West was responsible for Russian invasions (Chechnya, Georgia, Syria, Ukraine), and not their own greed and imperialism. American academics provided the narrative." British historian Adam Tooze wrote that Applebaum offered no evidence for her allegation.

In June 2022, Mearsheimer delivered a speech on "The Causes and Consequences of the Ukraine War". He said there is no evidence that Putin wants to conquer Ukraine, and no evidence that Russia wants to install a puppet government. Mearsheimer argued that if Putin did want to conquer Ukraine, he would have used a larger army. Mearsheimer believes Putin has been telling the truth about his motives, saying Putin "does not have a history of lying to other leaders" or to foreign audiences.

Joe Cirincione called Mearsheimer "dangerously wrong". He wrote that Putin recently likened himself to Tsar Peter the Great, who, Putin said, had justly returned land to Russia; and that Russia's foreign minister Sergei Lavrov said that Russia's goal was to "free Ukraine’s people from the 'unacceptable regime' in Kyiv". For Cirincione, the "greatest flaw" in Mearsheimer's argument is that "he must minimize Russian atrocities" and "excuse Russian behavior as an understandable reaction to the threats it perceives" in order to make his case. Political scientist Filip Kostelka said "By publicly defending his scientifically unsound thesis, Mearsheimer legitimizes Russia's propaganda and violates the fundamental values of social responsibility that all academics should respect". He wrote that Mearsheimer cherry-picked official statements by Russia's leadership and takes them at face value. Kostelka accused Mearsheimer of double standards, saying he does not give the same importance to "Russia’s imperial ambitions" or denial of Ukraine's right to exist. Kostelka also said that Mearsheimer "remained oblivious to Russia’s numerous lies on public record, including Putin's original denial of any involvement in Crimea in 2014, which was followed by open boasting about the annexation a few months later". He wrote that Russia only failed to take over the country because of a "disastrous miscalculation by the Kremlin".

Mearsheimer was interviewed by Chotiner again in November 2022, after Russia annexed four provinces of Ukraine. He said that Putin only wanted to control those four provinces and "to make sure that the Ukrainian rump state that is left is neutral and is not associated with NATO in any formal or informal way". In his view, Russia's attack on Kyiv was meant to force the Ukrainian government to give up its plans of joining NATO. Mearsheimer was challenged by Chotiner, who said his arguments were contradicted by Putin's statements and actions. Mearsheimer replied that there was currently no evidence that Putin had any imperial ambitions but that there was "a huge amount of evidence that it was NATO expansion and the more general policy of making Ukraine a western bulwark on Russia’s border that motivated [Putin] to attack on February 24th".

Mearsheimer doubts that a "meaningful" peace agreement could be reached because of "maximalist objectives". He believes that the best outcome would be a volatile frozen conflict, while the worst outcome would be nuclear war, which he considered unlikely. According to Michael Lawriwsky, former chair of the Ukrainian Studies Foundation at Monash University and former editor for the Australian Ukrainian Review, Mearsheimer accepts "Putin's rhetoric, which downplays the complexities of Ukraine’s stance on NATO" and "align[s] closely with Putin's misleading narrative that portrays NATO expansion as a direct threat to Russia".

Mearsheimer was interviewed by Chotiner a third time in March 2025, after the 2025 Trump–Zelenskyy Oval Office meeting. He praised U.S. President Donald Trump's handling of the issue and said that Ukraine must agree to Russia's terms: remaining a neutral country with no NATO membership, ceding territory in eastern Ukraine, and demilitarizing. Chotiner questioned whether Mearsheimer underestimated Putin, saying that Mearsheimer had previously predicted Putin would not invade Ukraine in 2014. Mearsheimer responded that the situation had changed after 2014. He stated that Putin was forced to invade Ukraine because of NATO expansion and U.S. President Joe Biden's foreign policy, and that Putin did not seek to occupy and conquer Ukraine. In response, Chotiner mentioned far-right Russian philosopher Alexander Dugin's statements that Russia's "civilization" will not "be complete until we have united all Eastern Slavs and all Eurasian brothers into a common big space"; Dugin previously interviewed Mearsheimer. Mearsheimer stated that, while he and Dugin agreed that NATO was at fault for the conflict, the two disagreed on several other political issues. He said that Dugin's influence on Putin was overstated.

=== Liberal international order ===
In The Great Delusion: Liberal Dreams and International Realities (Yale University Press, 2018) Mearsheimer presents a critique of the geopolitical strategy he refers to as "liberal hegemony". His definition of liberal hegemony includes a three-part designation of it as an extension of Woodrow Wilson's original initiatives to make the world safe by turning its governments into democracies, turning geopolitical economic initiatives towards open markets compatible with democratic governments, and opening up and promoting other democratically liberal international social and culture societies on a global scale of inclusion. Mearsheimer stated in an interview broadcast on C-SPAN that liberal hegemony represents a "great delusion" and that much more weight should be associated with nationalism as a policy of enduring geopolitical value than the delusions he associated with liberal hegemony.

In a related 2019 article, Mearsheimer argued that the US-led liberal international order had been destined to collapse from its inception. Contrary to scholars such as John Ikenberry, who trace the origins of the liberal international order to the early Cold War, he asserted that the Cold War liberal order had in fact been a "bounded order", designed to help the U.S. and its allies compete more effectively against the Communist bloc. Although the US-led order became truly international after the collapse of the Soviet Union, the policies that undergird the order tended to precipitate its demise to the point that "[e]ven if Western policymakers had been wiser stewards of that order, they could not have extended its longevity in any meaningful way". In particular, US-led efforts to expand the order's membership by spreading democracy were bound to backfire by provoking nationalist resistance, embroiling the U.S. in disastrous military adventures, and stoking hostility among rival powers such as Russia and China. Liberal internationalist policies also tended to collide with nationalism and economic concerns within the liberal countries themselves, as illustrated by key events such as Brexit and the election of Donald Trump to the U.S. presidency. Finally, the drive to integrate rising powers such as China into the liberal international order effectively "helped China become a great power, thus undercutting unipolarity, which is essential for maintaining a liberal world order". Mearsheimer concluded by predicting that the liberal international order would be replaced by three distinct "realist orders" in the near term: "a thin international order", primarily concerned with arms control and managing the global economy, and two bounded orders, led respectively by China and the United States.

His claims about the liberal international order have sparked a lively debate and prompted responses from scholars such as Robert Jervis, Christopher Layne, Jennifer Pitts, Jack Snyder, William C. Wohlforth, and C. William Walldorf. In a critique of The Great Delusion, Wohlforth writes that the book fails to make good on its core claim: "First, you cannot establish a causal connection between liberalism and imprudent foreign policy by looking at only liberalism and imprudent foreign policy. Because Mearsheimer subjects no other ideology to the same scrutiny to which he subjects liberalism, there is no way to know whether liberalism stands out this regard.... Second, you cannot establish that a permissive systemic environment is a necessary condition by looking only at cases that occur in a permissive strategic environment." Wohlforth also argues that The Great Delusion is inconsistent with Mearsheimer's Tragedy of Great Power Politics: "Given that other great powers were destined to come back, and the theory's stipulation that their preferences (i.e., revisionism) are independent of anything the U.S. does (because nothing the U.S. does can reduce their uncertainty about U.S. intentions, and vice-versa), why would a unipolar U.S. not seek to expand and lock in gains when it had the opportunity to do so?"

In The Great Delusion, Mearsheimer makes significant reference to Laurence Lampert's nihilistic interpretation of Leo Strauss to illustrate a realist view of political philosophy.

The Stanford Encyclopedia of Philosophy has since described the book as "a classic of the theory of international relations."

=== Hypothesis testing in international relations ===
In 2013, Mearsheimer and Stephen Walt published "Leaving theory behind: Why simplistic hypothesis testing is bad for International Relations". They observe that in recent years, scholars of international relations have devoted less effort to creating and refining theories or using them to guide empirical research. Instead is a focus on what they call a simplistic hypothesis testing, which emphasizes discovering well-verified empirical regularities. They state that to be a mistake because insufficient attention to theory leads to misspecified empirical models or misleading measures of key concepts. They also point out that because of the poor quality data in international relations, it is less likely that the efforts will produce cumulative knowledge. It will lead to only a short-term gain and will make scholarship less useful to concerned citizens and policymakers.

Theories give a scholar an overarching framework of the myriad realms of activity. Theories are like maps and aim to simplify a complex reality, but unlike maps, theories provide a causal story by saying that one or more factors can explain a particular phenomenon. Theories attempt to simplify assumptions about the most relevant factors in the aim to explain how the world works. Some grand theories like realism or liberalism claim to explain broad patterns of state behavior, and middle-range theories focus on more narrowly defined phenomena like coercion, deterrence, and economic sanctions.

They list eight reasons why theories are important. The problems that arise from inadequate attention to theory is that it is impossible to construct good models or interpret statistical findings correctly. By privileging hypothesis testing, that is overlooked. It might make sense to pay more attention to hypothesis testing if it produced much useful knowledge about international relations, but Mearsheimer and Walt claim that this is not the case and that the simplistic hypothesis test is inherently flawed. Selection bias is also a problem that arise from inadequate attention to theory. To examine that more clearly, the authors point out James Fearson's critique of Paul Huth and Bruce Russett's analyses of extended deterrence. Mearsheimer and Walt also point out that contemporary international relations scholarship faces challenging measurement issues because of inadequate attention to theory and cause misleading measures. A few examples are given to support their claim, including Dan Reiter and Allan Stam's Democracies at War.

Mearsheimer and Walt state that it is a sophisticated study but contains questionable measures of key concepts and that the measures to test their idea do not capture the theories' core concepts. Poor data, the absence of explanation, and the lack of cumulation are other problems, arising from inadequate attention to theory and focusing too much on simplistic hypothesis testing.

== Personal politics ==
In 2019, Mearsheimer said that his preferred candidate in the 2020 Democratic Party presidential primaries was Bernie Sanders and that economic inequality was the greatest problem faced by the United States. He has said that he has very liberal views on gay rights and gay marriage, and expressed support of gender equality.

In a 2004 speech, Mearsheimer praised the British historian E. H. Carr for his 1939 book The Twenty Years' Crisis and argued that Carr was correct when he argued that international relations were a struggle of all against all, with states always placing their own interests first. Mearsheimer said that Carr's points were still as relevant for 2004 as for 1939 and went on to deplore what he claimed was the dominance of "idealist" thinking about international relations in British academic life.

=== Noelle-Neumann controversy ===
In October 1991, Mearsheimer was drawn into a bitter controversy at the University of Chicago regarding Elisabeth Noelle-Neumann, then a visiting professor from Germany. Noelle-Neumann was a prominent German pollster and a leading academic on public opinion research, who authored the highly regarded book, The Spiral of Silence. The debate centered on an article written for Commentary magazine by Leo Bogart, "The Pollster and the Nazis", which described Noelle-Neumann's past employment as a writer and editor for the Nazi newspaper Das Reich from 1940 to 1942. Noelle-Neumann's response to the article was to claim that "texts written under a dictatorship more than 50 years ago cannot be read as they were in 1937, 1939 or 1941. Severed from the time and place where they were written, they are no longer real, for reality is in part based on time and place."

As chairman of Chicago's political science department at the time, Mearsheimer sat down with Noelle-Neumann to discuss the article and the allegations. After meeting with her for over three hours, Mearsheimer publicly declared, "I believe that Noelle-Neumann was an anti-Semite", and he spearheaded a campaign to ask her for an apology. He joined other University of Chicago faculty in writing a joint piece for Commentary that reacted to Noelle-Neumann's reply to the accusation against her. They declared that "by providing rhetorical support for the exclusion of Jews, her words helped make the disreputable reputable, the indecent decent, the uncivilized civilized, and the unthinkable thinkable." Mearsheimer said, "Knowing what we know now about the Holocaust, there is no reason for her not to apologize. To ask somebody who played a contributing role in the greatest crime of the 20th century to say 'I'm sorry' is not unreasonable."

== Selected bibliography ==
=== Books ===
- Conventional Deterrence. Cornell University Press. 1983. ISBN 0801415691. OCLC 9394615.
- Liddell Hart and the Weight of History. Cornell University Press. 1988. ISBN 080142089X. OCLC 17953067.
- The Tragedy of Great Power Politics. W.W. Norton & Company. 2001. ISBN 0393020258. OCLC 46678382.
- The Israel Lobby and U.S. Foreign Policy. Farrar, Straus and Giroux. 2007. ISBN 978-0374177720. OCLC 144227359.
- Why Leaders Lie: The Truth About Lying in International Politics. Oxford University Press. 2011. ISBN 9780199758739. OCLC 593639329.
- The Great Delusion: Liberal Dreams and International Realities. Yale University Press. 2018. ISBN 978-0-300-23419-0.
- How States Think: The Rationality of Foreign Policy. Yale University Press. 2023. ISBN 978-0300269307.

=== Journal articles ===
- "Precision-guided munitions and conventional deterrence". Survival. 21 (2): 68–76. 1979. doi:10.1080/00396337908441802. ISSN 0039-6338.
- "Maneuver, Mobile Defense, and the NATO Central Front". International Security. 6 (3): 104–122. 1982. doi:10.2307/2538609. ISSN 0162-2889. JSTOR 2538609.
- "Why the Soviets Can't Win Quickly in Central Europe". International Security. 7 (1): 3–39. 1982. doi:10.2307/2538686. ISSN 0162-2889. JSTOR 2538686.
- "Nuclear Weapons and Deterrence in Europe" (PDF). International Security. 9 (3): 19–46. 1984. doi:10.2307/2538586. JSTOR 2538586.
- "A Strategic Misstep: The Maritime Strategy and Deterrence in Europe". International Security. 11 (2): 3–57. 1986. doi:10.2307/2538957. ISSN 0162-2889. JSTOR 2538957.
- "Numbers, Strategy, and the European Balance". International Security. 12 (4): 174–185. 1988. doi:10.2307/2539001. ISSN 0162-2889. JSTOR 2539001.
- Mearsheimer, John J. (1989). "Assessing the Conventional Balance: The 3:1 Rule and Its Critics". International Security. 13 (4): 54–89. doi:10.2307/2538780. ISSN 0162-2889. JSTOR 2538780.
- "Back to the Future: Instability in Europe after the Cold War" (PDF). International Security. 15 (1): 5–56. 1990. doi:10.2307/2538981. ISSN 0162-2889. JSTOR 2538981.
- Mearsheimer, John J.; Hoffmann, Stanley; Keohane, Robert O. (1990). "Back to the Future, Part II: International Relations Theory and Post-Cold War Europe". International Security. 15 (2): 191–199. doi:10.2307/2538869. ISSN 0162-2889. JSTOR 2538869.
- Mearsheimer, John J.; Risse-Kappen, Thomas; Russett, Bruce M. (1990). "Back to the Future, Part III: Realism and the Realities of European Security". International Security. 15 (3): 216–222. doi:10.2307/2538912. ISSN 0162-2889. JSTOR 2538912.
- "The False Promise of International Institutions" (PDF). International Security. 19 (3): 5–49. 1994. doi:10.2307/2539078. ISSN 0162-2889. JSTOR 2539078.
- "A Realist Reply". International Security. 20 (1): 82–93. 1995. doi:10.2307/2539218. ISSN 0162-2889. JSTOR 2539218.
- "E.H. Carr vs. Idealism: The Battle Rages On" (PDF). International Relations. 19 (2): 139–152. 2005. doi:10.1177/0047117805052810. eISSN 1741-2862.
- "China's Unpeaceful Rise" (PDF). Current History. 105 (690): 160–162. 2006. doi:10.1525/curh.2006.105.690.160. ISSN 0011-3530.
- Mearsheimer, John J.; Walt, Stephen M. "The Israel Lobby and U.S. Foreign Policy" (PDF). London Review of Books. 28 (6) (1st ed.): 3–12. ISSN 0260-9592. Revised version published as "The Israel Lobby and U.S. Foreign Policy". Middle East Policy. 13 (3) (2nd ed.): 29–87. September 14, 2006. doi:10.1111/j.1475-4967.2006.00260.x. ISSN 1061-1924.
- "Reckless States and Realism" (PDF). International Relations. 23 (2): 241–256. June 24, 2009. doi:10.1177/0047117809104637. ISSN 0047-1178.
- "Why is Europe Peaceful Today" (PDF). European Political Science. 9 (3): 387–397. 2010. doi:10.1057/eps.2010.24. eISSN 1682-0983.
- "Gathering Storm: China's Challenge to US Power in Asia" (PDF). The Chinese Journal of International Politics. 3 (4): 381–396. December 8, 2010. doi:10.1093/cjip/poq016.
- Mearsheimer, John J.; Walt, Stephen M. (September 5, 2013). "Leaving theory behind: Why simplistic hypothesis testing is bad for International Relations" (PDF). European Political Science. 19 (3): 427–457. doi:10.1177/1354066113494320. eISSN 1682-0983.
- "The False Promise of International Institutions". International Organization. 19 (3): 5–49. 2017. doi:10.2307/2539078. ISSN 1531-5088. JSTOR 2539078.
- "Bound to Fail: The Rise and Fall of the Liberal International Order". International Security. 43 (4): 7–50. April 1, 2019. doi:10.1162/isec_a_00342. eISSN 1531-4804.
- "The Causes and Consequences of the Ukraine War" (PDF). Horizons: Journal of International Relations and Sustainable Development (21): 12–27. July 1, 2022. ISSN 2406-0402.

== See also ==
- Power (international relations)
