= The Deadliest Lies =

2007 book by Abraham Foxman

The Deadliest Lies: The Israel Lobby and the Myth of Jewish Control
- Author: Abraham Foxman
- Publication date: 2007
- ISBN: 9781403984920

The Deadliest Lies: The Israel Lobby and the Myth of Jewish Control is a 2007 book written by Abraham Foxman, the national director of the Anti-Defamation League. It was written as a rebuttal to John Mearsheimer and Stephen Walt's The Israel Lobby and U.S. Foreign Policy (2007).

Foxman says the book "demolishes a number of shibboleths" and is "a rebuttal of a pernicious theory about a mythically powerful Jewish lobby." Former Secretary of State George Shultz writes in the foreword to the book, "... the notion. U.S. policy on Israel and Middle East is the result of their [the lobby's] influence is simply wrong."

== See also ==
- Jewish lobby
- Israel lobby in the United States
- The Israel Lobby and U.S. Foreign Policy
