= Why Leaders Lie =

2011 book by John Mearsheimer

Why Leaders Lie: The Truth About Lying in International Politics
- First edition
- Author: John Mearsheimer
- Language: English
- Subject: Lying in politics
- Genre: International Politics
- Publisher: Oxford University Press (U.S.) and Duckworth (UK)
- Publication date: 2011
- Publication place: United Kingdom, United States
- Media type: Hardback
- Pages: 140
- ISBN: 0199975450
- Preceded by: The Israel Lobby and U.S. Foreign Policy

Why Leaders Lie: The Truth About Lying in International Politics is a 2011 book by the political scientist John Mearsheimer.

== Synopsis ==
The book argues that leaders lie to foreign audiences as well as their own people because they think it is good for their country, citing the example of President Franklin D. Roosevelt's lie about the Greer incident in August 1941, due to a deep commitment to getting the United States into World War II, which he thought was in America's national interest.

The book maintains that leaders do not lie much to other countries, and that democratic leaders are actually more likely to lie to their own people than autocrats. Thus, he starts his book by saying that it is not surprising Saddam Hussein did not lie about having WMD—he truthfully said he had none—but that George Bush and some of his key advisors did lie to the American people about the threat from Iraq. Mearsheimer argues that leaders are most likely to lie to their own people in democracies that fight wars of choice in distant places. The author says that it is difficult for leaders to lie to other countries because there is not much trust among them, especially when security issues are at stake, and you need trust for lying to be effective. He concludes that it is easier for leaders to lie to their own people because there is usually a good deal of trust between them.

Mearsheimer suggests that most political lies fall into one of five categories: inter-state lies, fear-mongering, strategic cover-ups, nationalist myths, and liberal lies. He explains the reasons why leaders pursue each of these different kinds of lies. He also says that international lying can have negative effects, and there he emphasizes "blowback," which is where telling international lies helps cause a culture of deceit at home, and (unintended consequences)/"backfiring," which is where telling a lie leads to a failed policy. He also emphasizes that there are two other kinds of deception besides lying: "concealment,” which is where a leader remains silent about an important matter, and "spinning," which is where a leader tells a story that emphasizes the positive and downplays or ignores the negative. Mearsheimer does not consider the moral dimension of international lying; he looks at it simply from a realist perspective.

== Reception ==
The work attracted several positive reviews, with both The Washington Post and Foreign Affairs describing the book as "fascinating". The Oxonian Review criticised the book's realist perspective for understating the disadvantages of lying. They also suggested that Mearsheimer finds few examples of lies in international politics only because of his narrow definition of what counts as a lie: explicitly verbal untruths, not misdirection by other means.

== See also ==
- John Mearsheimer bibliography
