= Why the Soviets Can't Win Quickly in Central Europe =

1982 article

- Author: John Mearsheimer
- Language: English
- Genre: Military science
- Publisher: MIT Press
- Publication date: 1982, 1983

"Why the Soviets Can't Win Quickly in Central Europe" is a 1982 article written by John Mearsheimer published in International Security, republished as a chapter in Conventional Deterrence in 1983. It argued against the prevailing belief at the time that a Warsaw Pact invasion would lead to a quick victory over NATO on Continental Europe on the basis that a surprise attack was likely not possible, the deficiencies in the speed of Warsaw Pact mobilisation were too great and the urban defense capacity of NATO was sufficient to bring any advance to a halt. Its publication caused an academic debate that ran for several years about the conventional and nuclear approaches to a hypothetical NATO-Warsaw Pact war.

== Content ==
The paper opened with an acknowledgement that "conventional wisdom" supports a "quick and decisive victory" as the outcome of a Warsaw Pact blitzkrieg, but listed a number of studies that had arrived at more optimistic conclusions from a NATO perspective, beginning with a 1973 article by Alain Enthoven and Wayne Smith. It then separates the topic of the paper into two questions: whether the Soviets had "the capacity to effect a blitzkrieg" and whether there were prospects "for a Soviet success".

After concluding surprise was unlikely to play a role without of a NATO failure to mobilise, Mearsheimer conducted an analysis of the balances of forces on the NATO-Warsaw Central Front (West Germany), where the Pact had a 2.8:1 advantage in artillery, a 2.5:1 advantage in tanks and a 1.2:1 advantage in standing manpower, placing emphasis on the qualitative advantage of NATO artillery.

Mearsheimer further argued that, in addition to NATO's ability to replenish its losses, an initial mobilisation to prevent the Pact advantage from reaching 2:1 was desirable, but not strictly necessary to prevent an overwhelming advance. He followed this with a comparative analysis of NATO and Warsaw Pact doctrine relevant to the scenario, concluding that thanks to NATO's forward defense strategy the war "would be won or lost along the inter-German border", and that preventing a breakthrough was crucial to the defense of NATO due to a lack of reserve strength.

With this scenario set, Mearsheimer went into detail on this hypothetical NATO-Warsaw Pact war in Germany, employing among other arguments a rigid 3:1 rule of minimum advantage for advance that would become central to the ensuing criticism of this article. Since Soviet doctrine required a 5:1 advantage but lacked such an advantage across the front provided NATO was able to launch a multi-pronged attack, Mearsheimer argued they were unlikely to be able to advance enough to avoid attrition warfare. This was followed with a detailed analysis of the most likely Pact vector of attack, which highlighted the NATO defensive urban warfare advantage. In more minute detail, he then examined the physical parameters affecting a hypothetical Warsaw Pact advance, from favourable NATO force-to-space ratios and the "crossing the T" phenomenon unfavourable to advance, to the lack of a Soviet response to NATO's proliferation of ATGMs.

The battlefield analysis ended with an argument that the inflexiblity of initiative brought about by the command structure of the Soviet Army would lead to the army being unable to effectively exploit any holes in the NATO frontline at the NCO level, negatively evaluating attempts to overcome this deficiency with "steamroller tactics". Further complicating that was the relative inexperience of the conscripts stationed in East Germany and the unreliability of the Warsaw Pact as a whole. In the conclusion, the statement by United States Secretary of Defense Donald Rumsfeld that "the burden of deterrence" had "once again fallen on the conventional forces" was welcomed, warning that the deployment of the American Corps in NORTHAG must be completed, that the Belgians, British and Dutch must continue to modernise their forces and that NATO must prepare to respond to even ambiguous Warsaw Pact mobilisations.

== "Assessing the Conventional Balance: The 3:1 Rule and Its Critics" ==
This article was published in response to criticisms of Mearsheimer's application of the 3:1 rule as expressed and used in "Why the Soviets Can't Win Quickly in Central Europe", most notably Joshua Epstein's 1988 article. Epstein counter-attacked in the same issue. One of its chief critics, Joshua M. Epstein, published a rebuttal that year. As Mearsheimer had devoted much of the paper to correcting Trevor N. Dupuy, he responded in the following issue of International Security. The debate was revived a decade later, but a detailed mathematical evaluation of the 3:1 rule, which Mearsheimer had first examined in 1982, would not come until Kress and Talmor 1999.

The paper continues to be referenced to this day in the context of force ratio studies.

== Reception ==
More widely read than his previous studies, it is this paper along with his 1983 book that propelled Mearsheimer onto the academic scene as an "Optimist" (Note: Optimistic from a NATO perspective, regarding its ability to defend in the European theatre. Not to be confused with the "Peace movement".) in their debate with the "Pessimists", which has been termed the "Great Debate" in security circles, in which moderate Pessimists held a majority.

=== Early ===
The context of the article was described in Matthews 1996, as standing in opposition US president Ronald Reagan's strengthening of NATO forces in Europe, supported by Samuel P. Huntington, among others. Although Huntington himself initially reviewed Mearsheimer's article favourably. Also relevant was the debate over whether or not the US nuclear weapons in West Germany were necessary.

"Why the Soviets Can't Win Quickly in Central Europe" was positively received by Posen and Evera 1983, Brauch and Unterseher 1984, Lübkemeier 1985 Dean 1986, and to some extent Weinstein 1983, and Strachan 1985 and Simpson 1985.

Its conclusions were opposed on methodological grounds by Jack Snyder and with alternative models by William Kaufmann, William Mako and Andrew Hamilton. With the exception of Corcoran 1983, most concrete opposition did not come until three separate articles published in 1988 by Snyder, by Epstein and by Eliot A. Cohen, building on an earlier review by Aaron Friedberg.

Although the reception that year was not entirely negative, with some praise in Sens 1988, Makinda 1988 and Thomson 1989, most papers published in the immediate aftermath of these were critical.

=== Later assessment ===
The article has been employed favourably in some retrospective analyses. That by Barry D. Watts, then director of the Northrop Grumman Analysis Center, relayed Cohen's criticisms. The 2016 review by military Kenton White criticised it for not taking USSR and general WTO airborne capabilities (Note: Tecott and Halterman defended Mearsheimer's omission. "He omits airpower variables from his model not because he thinks these variables are irrelevant to the outcome, but because he argues that airpower would favor NATO, only strengthening his argument.") or their OMG concept into account, while following Cohen in arguing for an alternative view that the WTO might have been able to prepare a "standing start" (Note: A possibility publicised by senators Sam Nunn and Dewey F. Bartlett in a 1977 report.) attack undetected enough for the resulting delay to allow for the WTO to potentially collapse part of the NATO front, which Mearsheimer had argued was not a danger. White followed this up in more detail in 2017. A less detailed critique was published by international relations professor Arash Heydarian Pashakhanlou. The approach of Cohen and Kenton was in turn criticised in the overview of Tecott and Halterman, which defended Mearsheimer while warning about his "over-extrapolation" on the basis of a single scenario, echoing Richard Stoll's 1990 defense of Mearsheimer's article to justify further model-based approaches.

The credibility of NATO's defences was analysed and discussed ... Many of the contemporary analyses looked at strategy or numbers, taking a wholesale approach, but failed to address the overall capability based on existing force structures. An example is the analysis given by Dr J Mearsheimer, which provides an example contemporary to the period. It provides a useful perspective on the difficulties inherent in assessing the credibility of defence policy from a purely academic standpoint.

— Kenton White, "Credibility Analysis – Mearsheimer's viewpoint" (2016)

Outside the context of the debate and with the passage of time, the article began to see uncritical use, especially with the successful urban defences of the Russo-Ukrainian War.

== See also ==
- John Mearsheimer bibliography
