= David Davies Memorial Institute =

Think tank at Aberystwyth University

The David Davies Memorial Institute of International Studies, also referred to as the David Davies Memorial Institute (DDMI), is a think tank at Aberystwyth University in Aberystwyth, Wales, United Kingdom. Founded in 1951, the institute regularly publishes books, a journal, and hosts lectures annually. The institute founded the "International Relations" journal (later acquired by SAGE Publications), to which the DDMI regularly contributes.

== History ==
The DDMI was established in 1951 to commemorate the legacy of Lord David Davies, 1st Baron Davies and his mission to promote a more orderly and just world through international cooperation, organization, and law. In 2001, the institute relocated from London to the department of International Politics at Aberystwyth University. The DDMI's research has evolved from efforts to understand important questions of disarmament and international organization to concentrations on security agendas, questions of global responsibility, and the status of the 'individual' in a world system of states.

== Research ==
The institute has on-going research projects led by its members.

=== Alliances and Trust Building in International Politics ===
The Alliances and Trust Building project explores the question of trust in international politics. The project seeks to answer the following question: "How, and under what conditions, do alliances lead to the establishment of trusting relationships between states?" The project is a collaborative effort of the institute and other international relations professionals that focus on bilateral relationships within the NATO alliance. The project is funded by the British Academy and the Gwendoline and Margaret Davies Charity.

Key publications:

- Booth, Ken and Nicholas J. Wheeler, The Security Dilemma: Fear, Cooperation and Trust in World Politics (Palgrave, 2007).
- Ruzicka, Jan and Nicholas J. Wheeler (2010) "The Puzzle of Trusting Relationships in the Nuclear Non-Proliferation Treaty", International Affairs, 86 (1), 69–85. Keating, Vincent C. and Jan Ruzicka (2014) "Trusting Relationships in International Politics: No Need to Hedge", Review of International Studies, 40 (4), 753–770.
- Ruzicka, Jan and Vincent C. Keating (2015) "Going Global: Trust Research and International Relations", Journal of Trust Research, 5 (1), 8–26.

=== Harm in International Politics ===
In this three-volume study, the problem of harm in global politics is explored. The project questions whether the human race has the capacity to control both non-violent and violent harm in politics. The volumes analyse the theoretical issues underlining the study of harm in international politics. The volumes consider the ways in which the Western international system has regulated harm, and the rise of cosmopolitan harm conventions. The research also explores the growth of human interconnectedness and emotional identification ranging from family ties to those of expansive nation-states.

==== Selected Recent Publications ====
- Linklater, Andrew, Violence and Civilization in the Western States-Systems (Cambridge University Press, 2017)
- Linklater, Andrew, The Problem of Harm in World Politics: Theoretical Investigations (Cambridge University Press, 2011)
- Linklater, Andrew (2009) "Human Interconnectedness", International Relations, 23(3), 481–97.
- Linklater, Andrew (2009) "Grand Narratives and International Relations", Global Change, Peace and Security, 21(1), 3–17.
- Linklater, Andrew (2007) "Public Spheres and Civilizing Processes" Theory, Culture and Society, Vol. 24, No. 4, 31–37
- Linklater, Andrew (2007) "Towards a sociology of global morals with an 'emancipatory intent'" Review of International Studies, Vol. 33, 135–150

=== Emancipatory Realism ===
This research project explores Ken Booth's work on the discipline of International Relations. It is informed by the various fields of International Relations, particularly those of International Relations Strategy, Security Studies, and Theory.

== Events ==
The DDMI organizes and hosts events annually. The institute hosts conferences, seminars, workshops, and its annual lecture series. Events are held in Aberystwyth and other places such as Cardiff, London, and abroad.

=== DDMI Annual Lecture ===
Previous DDMI lectures have included talks from various political authorities such as Anne Applebaum (2018) and Lawrence Freedman (2017).

=== Kenneth N. Waltz Annual Lecture ===
In conjunction with Sage Publications, the journal International Relations, and the DDMI, the annual Waltz lecture focuses on areas of particular interest to the late Kenneth Waltz, a theorist in International Relations. Christopher Coker of the London School of Economics delivered the 34th annual lecture in 2017.

=== EH Carr Memorial Lecture ===
The EH Carr Memorial Lecture is regarded as one of the most distinguished lecture series in the field of the international politics. Stephen Walt of Harvard University delivered the 34th annual lecture in 2017.

== Funding ==
=== Gwendoline and Margaret Davies Charity ===
The institute is supported by the Gwendoline and Margaret Davies Charity and the Department of International Politics at Aberystwyth University. Grant income has also been a source of revenue as has been smaller donations over the years. The charity has long supported the DDMI.

== Directors ==
The current director of the DDMI is Jan Ruzicka. He became director September 2013. Prior to his position as director, he worked at the institute as a research assistant on the project 'The Challenges to Trust-Building in Nuclear Worlds'.

Ken Booth led the DDMI from 2011 to 2013. Since 2013 he holds the role of DDMI's President. He is a current editor-in-chief (along with Milja Kurki and William Bain) of "International Relations".

Nicholas Wheeler served as the DDMI's director in the period 2005–2011. He remains a DDMI Affiliate.

Andrew Linklater led the DDMI in the years 2002–2005. He is a DDMI Affiliate.

Michael Cox served as director of the DDMI between 2001 and 2002.
