= Regional hegemony =

Ability of a country to strongly control or influence its neighbors

In international relations, regional hegemony is the hegemony (political, economic, or military predominance, control or influence) of one independently powerful state, known as the regional hegemon over other neighboring countries. The relationship between regional hegemons and the other states within their spheres of influence is analogous to the relationship between a global hegemon and the other states in the international system.

The prominent international relations scholar John Mearsheimer writes extensively about the pursuit of regional hegemony in his book, The Tragedy of Great Power Politics. According to his theory, known as offensive realism, the anarchic nature of the international system, the desire for survival, and the uncertainty about other states' intentions ultimately lead states to pursue regional hegemony. According to Mearsheimer, global hegemony is an unattainable goal; instead, a state which has achieved the level of regional hegemon will then work to prevent the development of peer competitors in other regions.

== Contemporary examples ==
Contemporary examples are often politically sensitive or arguable. Often analysis of regional hegemons are based on a specific context or perspective which renders their identification subjective. The United States is a clear example of a regional hegemon in the Americas. Moreover, Turkey is often referred to as an aspiring regional hegemon in its Middle Eastern periphery.

== See also ==
- Counterhegemony
- Great power
- Superpower
- Hegemony
- Middle power
- Regional power
- Sphere of influence
- List of periods of regional peace (e.g. Pax Romana)
