= The Tragedy of Great Power Politics =

2001 book by John Mearsheimer

- Author: John Mearsheimer
- Subject: Politics
- Published: 2001
- Publication place: United States
- Media type: Print (hardback)

The Tragedy of Great Power Politics is a book by the American scholar John Mearsheimer on the subject of international relations theory published by W. W. Norton & Company in 2001. Mearsheimer explains and argues for his theory of "offensive realism" by stating its key assumptions, evolution from early realist theory, and its predictive capability. An article adapted from the book had previously been published by Foreign Affairs.

The five bed-rock assumptions of Mearsheimer's theory of offensive realism are:

1. Anarchy: the international system is anarchic;
2. Offensive military capabilities: all great powers possess offensive military capabilities which they can use against each other;
3. Uncertainty: states cannot be sure that other states will not use military capabilities against them;
4. Survival: the primary goal of states is survival;
5. Rationality: states are rational unitary actors who think strategically about how to pursue their primary goal (survival).

From these assumptions, Mearsheimer argues that states will constantly seek to accumulate power, and that cooperation between states is hard. The "tragedy" of great power politics is that even security-seeking great powers will nonetheless be forced to engage in competition and conflict with one another.

== Main arguments ==
=== Primacy of land power ===
A state's power in international politics, Mearsheimer argues, derives from the strength of its military for two reasons: because land force is the dominant military power in the modern era, and because large bodies of water limit the power projection capabilities of land armies.

=== The stopping power of water ===
Mearsheimer argues that the presence of oceans in the world prevents any state from reaching world hegemony. He posits that large bodies of water limit the power projection abilities of militaries and thus naturally divide up powers in the globe.

He uses the example of the isolation provided to Britain by the English Channel, which allowed it to act as an offshore balancer on mainland Europe. Britain, he argues, never had ambitions to control or dominate continental Europe. Instead it aimed only to maintain the balance of power and ensure that no state could become so powerful as to achieve regional hegemony on the continent. For much of the 19th century, Britain had an industrial capacity that would have allowed it to easily invade and dominate much of Europe.

However, Britain chose not to attempt domination of the continent, in part because it calculated that its aims of achieving security could be more cheaply achieved if the European powers could be played off against each other. By doing so, the European powers would be occupied on the European continent and unable to challenge Britain across the English Channel or interfere with Britain's economic interests in Asia and Africa.

Therefore, the central aim of American foreign policy is to be the hegemon in the Western Hemisphere only, and to prevent the rise of a similar hegemon in the Eastern Hemisphere. In turn, the proper role for the United States is as an offshore balancer, balancing against the rise of a Eurasian hegemon and going to war only as a last resort to thwart it.

Other scholars have disputed whether the stopping power of water actually makes conquest harder. A historian analyzed the claim:

Disregarding recent (since 1492 AD) events, the hypothesis makes sense. In 1281, water and the "good wind" (kamikaze) indeed stopped the Mongols on the way to Japan. Later, however, even with all sorts of kamikaze, water ceased to stop. In 1945, the citizens of Hamburg and Dresden, Berlin and Tokyo, Hiroshima and Nagasaki (those who survived), would not describe water power as stopping; certainly not the double habakusha—those who survived in Hiroshima on August 6 and within next two days managed to reach Nagasaki. Had Mearsheimer arranged a poll of double habakushas on August 10, "Does, in your opinion, water power stop?" he would have collected unanimous negative, not necessarily literal, replies. Just the day before the anniversary of the original kamikaze (August 15), the Japanese announced the unconditional surrender. They knew: water will not stop. Not this time.

=== State strategies for survival ===
==== Objective 1 – Regional hegemony ====
In addition to their principal goal, which is survival, great powers seek to achieve three main objectives. Their highest aim is to achieve regional hegemony. Mearsheimer argues although achieving global hegemony would provide maximum security to a state, it is not feasible because the world has too many oceans which inhibit the projection of military power. Thus, the difficulty of projecting military power across large bodies of water makes it impossible for great powers to dominate the world. Regional hegemons try strongly to prevent other states from achieving regional hegemony.

Instead, they try to maintain an even balance of power in regions and act to ensure the existence of multiple powers so as to keep those multiple powers occupied among themselves rather than being able to challenge the regional hegemon's interests, which they would be free to do if they were not occupied by their neighboring competitors. Mearsheimer uses the example of the United States, which achieved regional hegemony in the late 1800s and then sought to intervene wherever it looked as though another state might achieve hegemony in a region:

- Imperial Germany during World War I
- Nazi Germany during World War II
- Imperial Japan during World War II
- Soviet Union during the Cold War

==== Objective 2 – Maximum wealth ====
Great powers seek to maximize their share of the world's wealth because economic strength is the foundation of military strength. Great powers seek to prevent rival powers from dominating wealth-producing regions of the world. The United States, for example, sought to prevent the Soviet Union from dominating Western Europe and the Middle East. Had the Soviets gained control of these areas, the balance of power would have been altered significantly against the United States.

==== Objective 3 – Nuclear superiority ====
Mearsheimer asserts that great powers seek nuclear superiority over their rivals. Great powers exist in a world of multiple nuclear powers with the assured capacity to destroy their enemies called mutually assured destruction (MAD). Mearsheimer disagrees with the assertions that states are content to live in a MAD world and that they would avoid developing defenses against nuclear weapons. Instead, he argues that great powers would not be content to live in a MAD world and would try to search for ways to gain superiority over their nuclear rivals.

=== Rise of American power; 1800–1900 ===
The United States was a strongly expansionist power in the Americas. Mearsheimer points to the comment made by Henry Cabot Lodge that the United States had a "record of conquest, colonization and territorial expansion unequaled by any people in the 19th century." In the 1840s, Europeans began speaking about the need to preserve a balance of power in America and contain further American expansion.

By 1900, however, the United States had achieved regional hegemony and in 1895 its Secretary of State Richard Olney told Britain's Lord Salisbury that "today the U.S. is practically sovereign on this continent and its fiat is law upon the subjects within its interposition...its infinite resources and isolated position render it master of the situation and practically invulnerable against all other powers."

=== Future of American power ===
On the penultimate page of Tragedy, Mearsheimer warns:

Neither Wilhelmine Germany, nor imperial Japan, nor Nazi Germany, nor the Soviet Union had nearly as much latent power as the United States had during their confrontations ... But if China were to become a giant Hong Kong, it would probably have somewhere on the order of four times as much latent power as the United States does, allowing China to gain a decisive military advantage over the United States.

== Reception ==
The author was interviewed by Council on Foreign Relations owned magazine Foreign Affairs. Charles Kupchan of the Council on Foreign Relations called it an "important and impressive book" in which Mearsheimer "elegantly lays out his theoretical approach to the study of international politics". However, he is very critical of the way Mearsheimer uses history to compound his theory. Furthermore, Kupchan decries Mearsheimer's conviction in his own theory and his inability to be "more open to eclecticism in explaining politics among the great power".

John A. Hall, of McGill University, found the book's arguments strengthened by "a tightness and coherence".

The Columbia University Professor Richard Betts called Tragedy one of the three great works of the post–Cold War era, along with Francis Fukuyama's The End of History and the Last Man (1992) and Samuel Huntington's The Clash of Civilizations and the Remaking of World Order (1996). Betts also suggested that "once China's power is full grown", Mearsheimer's book may pull ahead of the other two in terms of influence.

Robert Kaplan outlines a similar prospect for Tragedy:

If China implodes from a socioeconomic crisis, or evolves in some other way that eliminates its potential as a threat, Mearsheimer's theory will be in serious trouble because of its dismissal of domestic politics. But if China goes on to become a great military power, reshaping the balance of forces in Asia, then Mearsheimer's Tragedy will live on as a classic".

=== Criticism ===
One review held that rapprochement between Britain and the United States at the end of the 19th century and the success of the European Union in transforming Europe's geopolitical landscape cast serious doubt on the notion that balancing and destructive rivalry are inescapable features of international system. If Mearsheimer had analyzed episodes of lasting peace that defy the predictions of balance-of-power theory, he would perhaps have been less convinced of the pervasive logic of offensive realism.

Another critique of Mearsheimer's views is that they ignore transnational superstructures, such as capitalism, non-state actors, and individual institutions within states. Mearsheimer asserts domestic politics to be irrelevant and states to be unable to provide one another with guarantees that they do not harbor hostile intentions. According to R. Harrison Wagner, Mearsheimer does not address whether democracy, trade, or another mechanism could prevent states from fighting, a view that is consistent with the broader perspective of the Kantian Peace Triangle.

Mearsheimer argues that polarity in the international system is the cause of war. That is especially true in unbalanced multipolarity in which there is a potential hegemon. Balanced multipolarity in which there is no potential hegemon has a less-asymmetrical distribution of power and so is less feared.

The fear is the least in bipolarity in which there is usually a rough balance of power between the two major states. However, the bargaining model of war disputes that claim on the grounds that war is costly. That and the fact that states are rational actors, requires some other cause that is more positive than polarity to drive nations to incur the cost of war.

A collection of his critics’ academic essays takes aim at Mearsheimer's theories in Tragedy: "Some of the criticism is scathing, proving that Mearsheimer is the political-science world's enfant terrible...."

According to Richard Ned Lebow, "All of Mearsheimer’s predictions about the post-Cold War world have been wrong."

In the first book on military globalization, Historian Max Ostrovsky argues that the hypothesis of stopping power of water disregards developments since 1492 and that in 1945 the citizens of German and Japanese cities would not describe water power as stopping.

== See also ==
- Amity-enmity complex
- Anarchy (international relations)
- Balance of power (international relations)
- Ideocracy
- International law
- John Mearsheimer bibliography
- Man, the State, and War
- Offensive realism
- Power politics
- Power Politics
- Power projection
- Regional hegemony
- Societal collapse
- State collapse
