= The Great Delusion =

2018 book by John Mearsheimer

- Author: John Mearsheimer
- Language: English
- Subject: international relations
- Publisher: Yale University Press
- Publication date: 2018
- Publication place: United States
- Pages: 313
- ISBN: 978-0-300-23419-0

The Great Delusion: Liberal Dreams and International Realities is a 2018 book by the American political scientist John Mearsheimer. The book is about international relations and contrasts realism with the idealism which it alleges is part of the United States' ruling ideology, arguing that the latter is unsustainable and deteriorates the liberalism its defenders promote.

The book was reviewed by C. William Walldorf, to which Mearsheimer responded with an article in Perspectives on Politics. Several lectures delivered on the subject of the book were widely viewed, including that before The Bush School of Government and Public Service and that before Carleton University. The book was delivered in lecture form at the SOAS University of London and the University of Bonn, and presented and discussed at the SETA Foundation.

== See also ==
- John Mearsheimer bibliography
- Liberal international order
