= William Bain (lecturer) =

British academic

Dr William Bain is a professor at the National University of Singapore, and previously senior lecturer at the University of Wales, Aberystwyth in the department of International Politics. He attended the University of South Carolina where he obtained a BA. He also attended University of British Columbia in Vancouver where he achieved an MA and PhD. Prior to joining UWA he lectured at University of Glasgow in international relations theory, international ethics, and eighteenth century political thought. He was previously a marine and served in the First Gulf War. He also has a beloved cat named Frankie.

== Research interests ==
William Bain's main research interests are international relations theory and normative approaches to world affairs. He has written two books, Between Anarchy and Society: Trusteeship and the Obligations of Power and Political Theology of International Order. He is also editor/contributor of Medieval Foundations of International Relations and The Empire of Security and the Safety of the People.

== List of Published Work ==
=== Books ===
- Political Theology of International Order, Oxford: Oxford University Press, 2020
- Between Anarchy and Society: Trusteeship and the Obligations of Power, Oxford: Oxford University Press, 2003.
- Editor and contributor, Medieval Foundations of International Relations, London: Routledge, 2017.
- Editor and contributor, The Empire of Security and the Safety of the People, London: Routledge, 2006.

=== Chapters in Books ===
- 'Saving Failed States: Trusteeship as an Arrangement of Security', in The Empire of Security and the Safety of the People, ed., William Bain, (London: Routledge, 2006).
- 'Trusteeship and Contemporary International Security', in Rethinking Ethical Foreign Policy: Pitfalls, Possibilities and Paradoxes, eds., Volker Heins and David Chandler, (London: Routledge, 2006).
- 'Self-Defence, Security, and Responsibility: India and the Right to Possess Nuclear Weapons', in Power and Responsibility in World Affairs, ed. by Cathal J. Nolan, ed., (Westport: Praeger Publishers, 2004)
- 'Against Crusading: The Ethic of Human Security and Canadian Foreign Policy', reprinted in Crosscurrents: International Relations in the Post-Cold War Era, 3rd edn., ed. by Mark Charlton (Scarborough: Nelson, 2002)
- 'John W. Davis', in Notable U.S. Ambassadors Since 1775, ed. by Cathal J. Nolan (Westport: Greenwood Publishing, 1997)
- 'Walter Hines Page', in Notable U.S. Ambassadors Since 1775, ed. by Cathal J. Nolan (Westport: Greenwood Publishing, 1997)

=== Academic Articles ===
- 'In Praise of Folly: International Administration and the Corruption of Humanity', International Affairs, 82, 3 (2006): 525-38.
- 'In Pursuit of Paradise: Trusteeship and Contemporary International Society', Tidsskriftet Politik (Denmark), 7.2 (2004): 6-14.
- 'The Political Theory of Trusteeship and the Twilight of International Equality', International Relations, 16.1 (2003), 59-77.
- 'The Idea of Trusteeship in International Society', The Round Table, 368 (2003), 67-76.
- 'The Tyranny of Benevolence?: National Security, Human Security, and the Practice of Statecraft', Global Society, 15.3 (2001), 277-294.
- 'Deconfusing Morgenthau: Moral Inquiry and Classical Realism Reconsidered', Review of International Studies, 26.3 (2000), 445-464.
- 'Against Crusading: The Ethic of Human Security and Canadian Foreign Policy', Canadian Foreign Policy, 6.3 (1999), 85-98.
- 'The Application of Geographic Information Systems (GIS) to International Studies', International Studies Notes, 20.2 (1995), 1-9, co-authored with Harvey Starr.
- 'Sino-Indian Military Modernization: The Potential for Destabilization', Asian Affairs: An American Review, 21.3 (1994), 131-147.
