= The Israel Lobby and U.S. Foreign Policy =

2007 book by John Mearsheimer and Stephen Walt

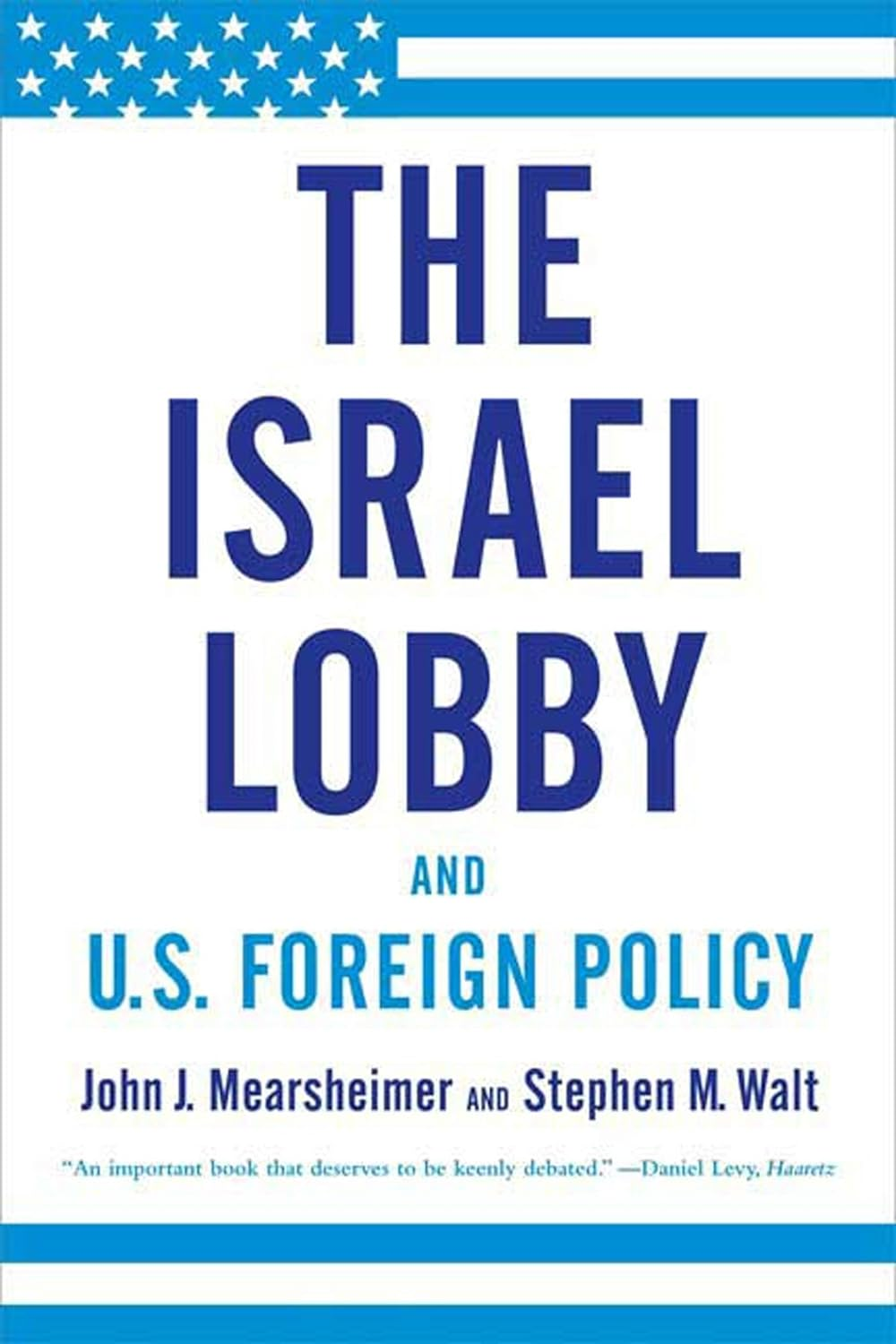
- Authors: John Mearsheimer; Stephen Walt
- Language: English
- Publisher: Farrar, Straus and Giroux
- Publication date: August 27, 2007
- Publication place: United States
- Media type: Print (hardback)
- Pages: 496
- ISBN: 0-374-17772-4
- OCLC: 144227359
- Dewey Decimal: 327.7305694 22
- LC Class: E183.8.I7 M428 2007

The Israel Lobby and U.S. Foreign Policy is a book by political scientists John Mearsheimer and Stephen Walt, published in August 2007. It was a New York Times Best Seller.

The book describes the lobby as a "loose coalition of individuals and organizations who actively work to steer U.S. foreign policy in a pro-Israel direction". Mearsheimer and Walt decry what they call misuse of "the charge of anti-Semitism", and argue that pro-Israel groups place great importance on "controlling debate" in American academia. The book "focuses primarily on the lobby's influence on U.S. foreign policy and its negative effect on American interests". The authors also argue that "the lobby's impact has been unintentionally harmful to Israel as well".

They maintain that the centerpiece of U.S. Middle East policy is its intimate relationship with Israel, and that the U.S. commitment to Israel is due primarily to the activities of the Israel lobby.

Mearsheimer and Walt argue that although "the boundaries of the Israel lobby cannot be identified precisely", it "has a core consisting of organizations whose declared purpose is to encourage the U.S. government and the American public to provide material aid to Israel and to support its government's policies, as well as influential individuals for whom these goals are also a top priority". They note that "not every American with a favorable attitude to Israel is part of the lobby", and that although "the bulk of the lobby is comprised of Jewish Americans", there are many American Jews who are not part of the lobby, and the lobby also includes Christian Zionists. They also claim a drift of important groups in "the lobby" to the right, and overlap with the neoconservatives.

The book was preceded by a paper commissioned by The Atlantic and written by Mearsheimer and Walt. The Atlantic rejected the paper, and it was published in the London Review of Books. The paper attracted considerable debate, both praise and criticism.

== Background ==
The book has its origins in an article commissioned in 2002 by The Atlantic Monthly. Four years later, when the article was submitted, it was unexpectedly turned down. Editor Cullen Murphy apparently sent the authors a letter, explaining the reasons for the rejection, but this letter was never made public.

According to Mearsheimer, The Atlantic simply “got cold feet”. At first it was very enthusiastic but as the authors went through all sorts of interactions with the journal, they eventually expressed doubts of the article ever being published. The handling editor reassured them, however, it would be published. He even offered them a $10,000 “kill guarantee” if it was not.

The authors then submitted the article to a ”handful” of other American journals, all eventually turning it down. Lower-level staff would initially express keen interest in the article but “as it filters up the chain of command”, people at the top would invariably kill it. The article was then “placed in the closet”, as it apparently was not possible to be published in the USA. An academic involved in the process, however, contacted London Review of Books, which agreed to publish the article. It also became available as a working paper at the Kennedy School's website in 2006. A third, revised version addressing some of the criticism was published in the Fall 2006 issue of Middle East Policy, the in-house journal of the Middle East Policy Council. The authors state that "In terms of its core claims, however, this revised version does not depart from the original Working Paper."

The book was published August 27, 2007. The book differs from the earlier papers in several ways: it includes an expanded definition of the lobby, it responds to the criticisms that the papers attracted, it updates the authors' analysis and it offers suggestions on how the U.S. should advance its interests in the Middle East. The book contends that the US-Israel alliance skews US foreign policy in Israel's favor, often at the expense of regional stability in the Middle East.

With his elaborated position on Israel in this book, Mearsheimer distanced his own position from scholars such as Hannah Arendt and Hans Morgenthau and their support for Israel, the latter of whom Mearsheimer had previously cited as significant to the development of his own writing in the field of international relations.

A paperback edition was published in September 2008.

== Content of the preceding paper ==
In April 2006, Philip Weiss discussed some of the background to the creation of the paper in an article in The Nation.

Mearsheimer and Walt argue that "No lobby has managed to divert U.S. foreign policy as far from what the American national interest would otherwise suggest, while simultaneously convincing Americans that U.S. and Israeli interests are essentially identical". They argue that "in its basic operations, it is no different from interest groups like the Farm Lobby, steel and textile workers, and other ethnic lobbies. What sets the Israel Lobby apart is its extraordinary effectiveness." According to Mearsheimer and Walt, the "loose coalition" that makes up the Lobby has "significant leverage over the Executive branch", as well as the ability to make sure that the "Lobby's perspective on Israel is widely reflected in the mainstream media." They claim that the American Israel Public Affairs Committee (AIPAC) in particular has a "stranglehold on the U.S. Congress", due to its "ability to reward legislators and congressional candidates who support its agenda, and to punish those who challenge it."

Mearsheimer and Walt decry what they call misuse of "the charge of anti-Semitism", and argue that pro-Israel groups place great importance on "controlling debate" in American academia; they maintain, however, that the Lobby has yet to succeed in its "campaign to eliminate criticism of Israel from college campuses", such as with Campus Watch and the U.S. Congress Bill H.R. 509. The authors conclude by arguing that when the Lobby succeeds in shaping U.S. policy in the Middle East, then "Israel's enemies get weakened or overthrown, Israel gets a free hand with the Palestinians, and the United States does most of the fighting, dying, rebuilding, and paying." According to Mearsheimer, "it's becoming increasingly difficult to make the argument in a convincing way that anyone who criticizes the lobby or Israel is an anti-Semite or a self-hating Jew." The authors pointed to the growing dissatisfaction with the war in Iraq, criticism of Israel's war in Lebanon and the publication of former President Jimmy Carter's book Palestine: Peace Not Apartheid as making it somewhat easier to criticize Israel openly.

== Reception ==
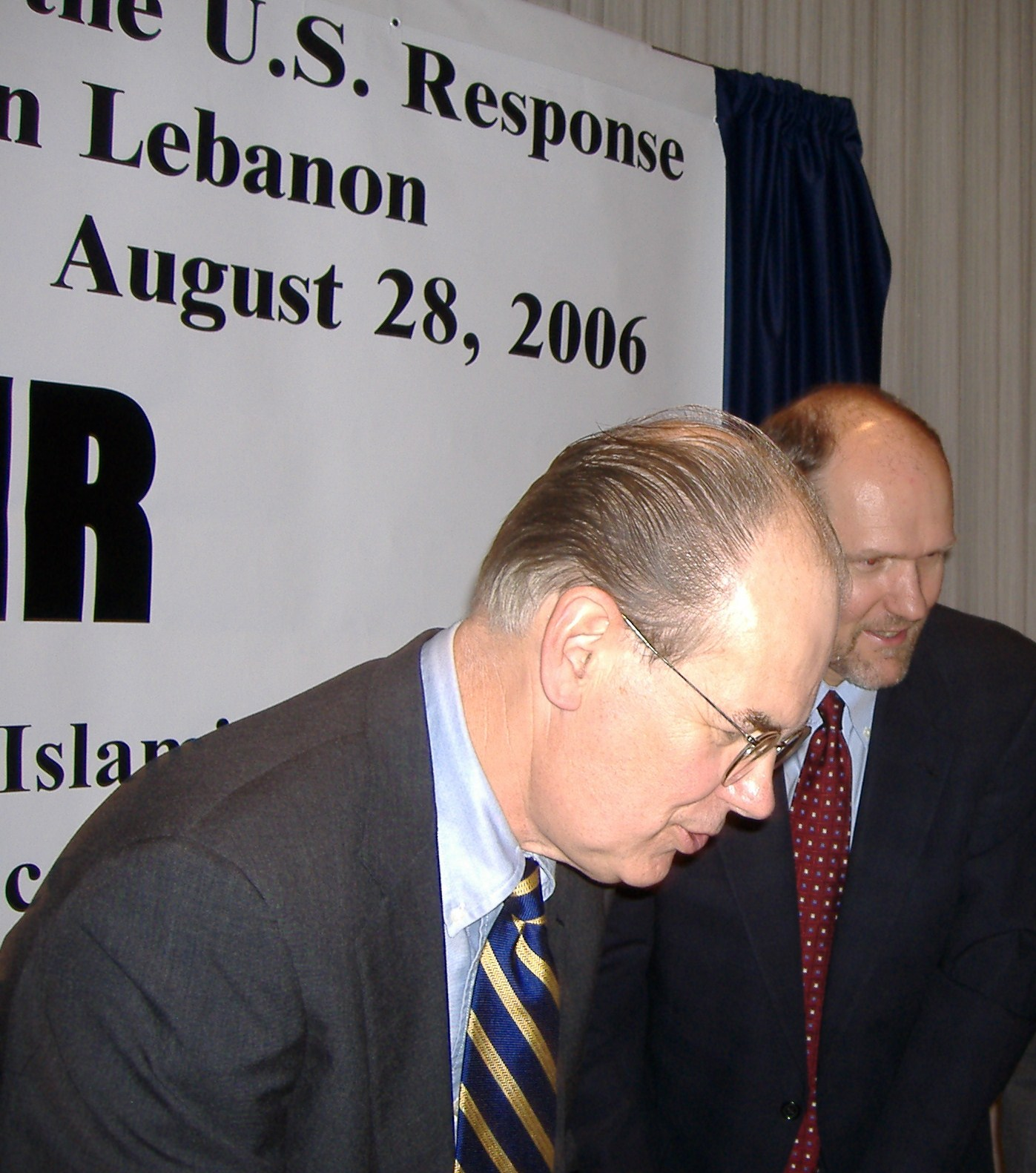
Professors John Mearsheimer (left) and Stephen Walt, authors of The Israel Lobby and U.S. Foreign Policy

The March 2006 publication of Mearsheimer and Walt's essay, "The Israel Lobby and U.S. Foreign Policy", was highly controversial. The essay's central controversial claim was that the Israel lobby's influence has distorted U.S. Middle East foreign policy away from what the authors referred to as "American national interest." Alan Dershowitz opined that criticizing the Israel lobby promoted a charged debate about what constitutes antisemitic conspiracy theorizing. Early drafts of this were sent to Jeffrey Epstein; at the time, Dershowitz was Epstein's lawyer during a child sex trafficking case.

As a result of the controversy created by Mearsheimer and Walt's article, the Dutch public broadcasting program Backlight (Tegenlicht) program produced a documentary entitled The Israel Lobby.

=== Praise ===
Former U.S. Ambassador Edward Peck wrote that "The expected tsunami of rabid responses condemned the report, vilified its authors, and denied there is such a lobby — validating both the lobby's existence and aggressive, pervasive presence and obliging Harvard to remove its name." Peck is generally in agreement with the paper's core thesis: "Opinions differ on the long-term costs and benefits for both nations, but the lobby's views of Israel's interests have become the basis of U.S. Middle East policies."

Tony Judt, a historian at New York University, wrote in The New York Times, that "[in] spite of [the paper's] provocative title, the essay draws on a wide variety of standard sources and is mostly uncontentious." He goes on to ask "[does] the Israel Lobby affect our foreign policy choices? Of course — that is one of its goals. [...] But does pressure to support Israel distort American decisions? That's a matter of judgment." He concludes the essay by taking the perspective that "this essay, by two 'realist' political scientists with no interest whatsoever in the Palestinians, is a straw in the wind." And that "it will not be self-evident to future generations of Americans why the imperial might and international reputation of the United States are so closely aligned with one small, controversial Mediterranean client state."

Michael Scheuer, a former senior official at the Central Intelligence Agency and in 2006 a terrorism analyst for CBS News, said to NPR that Mearsheimer and Walt are "basically right." Israel, according to Scheuer, has engaged in one of the most successful campaigns to influence public opinion in the United States ever conducted by a foreign government. Scheuer said to NPR that Mearsheimer and Walt "should be credited for the courage they have had to actually present a paper on the subject. I hope they move on and do the Saudi lobby, which is probably more dangerous to the United States than the Israeli lobby."

Zbigniew Brzezinski, former national security advisor to U.S. President Jimmy Carter, wrote: "Mearsheimer and Walt adduce a great deal of factual evidence that over the years Israel has been the beneficiary of privileged — indeed, highly preferential — financial assistance, out of all proportion to what the United States extends to any other country. The massive aid to Israel is in effect a huge entitlement that enriches the relatively prosperous Israelis at the cost of the American taxpayer. Money being fungible, that aid also pays for the very settlements that America opposes and that impede the peace process."

William Grimes of the New York Times wrote: "Coolly, not to say coldly, Mr. Mearsheimer and Mr. Walt mount a prosecutorial brief against Israel’s foreign and domestic policies, and against the state of Israel itself."

In his review in The Times, journalist Max Hastings wrote "otherwise intelligent Americans diminish themselves by hurling charges of antisemitism with such recklessness. There will be no peace in the Middle East until the United States faces its responsibilities there in a much more convincing fashion than it does today, partly for reasons given in this depressing book."

Adam Kirsch argued that Robert D. Kaplan's "deification" of Mearsheimer in The Atlantic in January 2012 showed that the authors of The Israel Lobby were winning the argument.

Glenn Greenwald has endorsed the book's central thesis, arguing "Walt and Mearsheimer merely voiced a truth which has long been known and obvious but was not allowed to be spoken. That’s precisely why the demonization campaign against them was so vicious and concerted: those who voice prohibited truths are always more hated than those who spout obvious lies."

Marxist historian Perry Anderson also endorsed the book's thesis, calling it "outstanding".

=== Mixed reviews ===
The paper was described as a "wake-up call" by Daniel Levy, former advisor to Israeli Prime Minister Ehud Barak, and said it is "jarring for a self-critical Israeli" and lacks "finesse and nuance." In a March 25 article for Haaretz, Levy wrote, "Their case is a potent one: that identification of American with Israeli interests can be principally explained via the impact of the Lobby in Washington, and in limiting the parameters of public debate, rather than by virtue of Israel being a vital strategic asset or having a uniquely compelling moral case for support". Levy also criticized Mearsheimer and Walt for confusing cause and effect; he added that the Iraq war was already decided on by the Bush administration for its own reasons.

Columnist Christopher Hitchens agreed that "AIPAC and other Jewish organizations exert a vast influence over Middle East policy", and stated that the paper "contains much that is true and a little that is original" and that he "would have gone further than Mearsheimer and Walt". However, he also says, paraphrasing a statement popularly misattributed to Samuel Johnson, that "what is original is not true and what is true is not original", and that the notion that the "Jewish tail wags the American dog... the United States has gone to war in Iraq to gratify Ariel Sharon, and... the alliance between the two countries has brought down on us the wrath of Osama Bin Laden" is "partly misleading and partly creepy". He also stated that the authors "seriously mischaracterize the origins of the problem" and produced "an article that is redeemed from complete dullness and mediocrity only by being slightly but unmistakably smelly."

In an address to Stanford University, Hitchens said that Mearsheimer and Walt "think that they are smarter than the American imperialists. If they were running the empire, [Mearsheimer and Walt] wouldn't be fooled by the Jews. They'd be making big business with the Saudis instead and not letting Arabs get upset about Zionism. Well, it's an extraordinary piece of cynicism, I would say, combined with an extraordinary naiveté. It doesn't deserve to be called realistic at all."

Joseph Massad, professor of modern Arab politics and intellectual history at Columbia University, writes, "Is the pro-Israel lobby extremely powerful in the United States? As someone who has been facing the full brunt of their power for the last three years through their formidable influence on my own university and their attempts to get me fired, I answer with a resounding yes. Are they primarily responsible for U.S. policies towards the Palestinians and the Arab world? Absolutely not." Massad then argued U.S. policy is "imperialistic", and has only supported those struggling for freedom when it is politically convenient, especially in the Middle East.

In describing the last of three "surprising weaknesses" of the paper, Eric Alterman writes in The Nation, "Third, while it's fair to call AIPAC obnoxious and even anti-democratic, the same can often be said about, say, the NRA, Big Pharma and other powerful lobbies. The authors note this but often seem to forget it. This has the effect of making the Jews who read the paper feel unfairly singled out and inspires much emotionally driven mishigas (craziness) in reaction. Do these problems justify the inference that the authors are anti-Semitic? Of course not."

In an extended review for Salon, Michelle Goldberg writes about some "baffling omissions," e.g.: "Amazingly, Walt and Mearsheimer don't even mention Fatah or Black September, Munich or Entebbe. One might argue that Israel has killed more Palestinians than visa [sic] versa, but it doesn't change the role of spectacular Palestinian terrorism in shaping American attitudes toward Israel." She also finds valuable points: "Walt and Mearsheimer are correct, after all, in arguing that discussion about Israel is hugely circumscribed in mainstream American media and politics.... Indeed, one can find far more critical coverage of the Israeli occupation in liberal Israeli newspapers like Haaretz than in any American daily."

Michael Massing, contributing editor of the Columbia Journalism Review, writes: "The lack of a clearer and fuller account of Palestinian violence is a serious failing of the essay. Its tendency to emphasize Israel's offenses while largely overlooking those of its adversaries has troubled even many doves." On the other hand, he writes: "The nasty campaign waged against John Mearsheimer and Stephen Walt has itself provided an excellent example of the bullying tactics used by the lobby and its supporters. The wide attention their argument has received shows that, in this case, those efforts have not entirely succeeded. Despite its many flaws, their essay has performed a very useful service in forcing into the open a subject that has for too long remained taboo."

Stephen Zunes, professor of politics at the University of San Francisco, gives a point by point critique of the paper. Zunes also writes that "The authors have also been unfairly criticized for supposedly distorting the history of the Israeli-Palestinian conflict, though their overview is generally quite accurate," and agreed with Joseph Massad's interpretation of Mearsheimer's and Walt's argument: "[T]here is something quite convenient and discomfortingly familiar about the tendency to blame an allegedly powerful and wealthy group of Jews for the overall direction of an increasingly controversial U.S. policy."

Noam Chomsky, professor of linguistics at MIT, said the authors took a "courageous stand" and said much of the criticism against the authors was "hysterical", but asserts that he did not find the thesis of the paper very convincing. He said that Stephen Zunes has rightly pointed out that "there are far more powerful interests that have a stake in what happens in the Persian Gulf region than does AIPAC [or the Lobby generally], such as the oil companies, the arms industry and other special interests whose lobbying influence and campaign contributions far surpass that of the much-vaunted Zionist lobby and its allied donors to congressional races." He finds that the authors "have a highly selective use of evidence (and much of the evidence is assertion)", ignore historical "world affairs", and blame the Lobby for issues that are not relevant.

In a review in The New Yorker, David Remnick writes, "Mearsheimer and Walt give you the sense that, if the Israelis and the Palestinians come to terms, bin Laden will return to the family construction business. It's a narrative that recounts every lurid report of Israeli cruelty as indisputable fact but leaves out the rise of Fatah and Palestinian terrorism before 1967; the Munich Olympics; Black September; myriad cases of suicide bombings; and other spectaculars. ... The duplicitous and manipulative arguments for invading Iraq put forward by the Bush Administration, the general inability of the press to upend those duplicities, the triumphalist illusions, the miserable performance of the military strategists, the arrogance of the Pentagon, the stifling of dissent within the military and the government, the moral disaster of Abu Ghraib and Guantánamo, the rise of an intractable civil war, and now an incapacity to deal with the singular winner of the war, Iran—all of this has left Americans furious and demanding explanations. Mearsheimer and Walt provide one: the Israel lobby. In this respect, their account is not so much a diagnosis of our polarized era as a symptom of it."

Writing in Foreign Affairs, Walter Russell Mead applauds the authors for "admirably and courageously" initiating a conversation on a difficult subject, but criticizes many of their findings. He observes that their definition of the "Israel lobby" is amorphous to the point of being useless: anyone who supports the existence of Israel (including Mearsheimer and Walt themselves) could be considered a part of the lobby, according to Mead. He is especially critical of their analysis of domestic politics in the United States, suggesting that the authors overstate the magnitude of lobbying in favor Israel when considered relative to overall sums spent on lobbying—only 1% in a typical election cycle. Mead considers their wider geopolitical analysis "more professional" but still "simplistic and sunny" on alternatives to a U.S.-Israeli alliance; he notes, for instance, that simply threatening to cut off aid to Israel in order to influence its behavior is misguided policy, given that other powers such as China, Russia, and India might well view an Israeli alliance as advantageous, should the United States withdraw. Mead rejects any antisemitic intent in the work, but feels that the authors left themselves open to the charge through "easily avoidable lapses in judgment and expression."

=== Criticism ===
In the following issue of the magazine were a number of responses criticizing the essay including from Jeffrey Herf, Andrei Markovits and Daniel Pipes. Herf and Markovits found Mearsheimer and Walt's arguments reminiscent of traditional fabricated antisemitic global conspiracies. They argue that Israel was not the focus of American Middle Eastern policy, but rather ensuring the secure global supply of oil. According to them, Israel would come to be viewed by the U.S. military establishment as a useful ally in a challenging region. They refute Mearsheimer and Walt's claim blaming the Israel Lobby for the Iraq War. They cite Saddam Hussein's own military commanders as not being aware that Iraq did not have weapons of mass destruction up to three months before the US led invasion. Herf and Markovits dispute Mearsheimer and Walt's implications that the State of Israel is the main cause for anti-Western sentiment in the Middle East and assert that American Jews have the right to free speech and political participation like all Americans. Daniel Pipes clarified that he was not involved in the founding of Campus Watch, and asserted that he does not "take orders from some mythical 'Lobby'." More criticisms appeared in the second issue of April, most prominently by Alan Dershowitz, citing a list of what he said were factual errors and distortions. Mearsheimer and Walt had referred to Dershowitz specifically as an "apologist" for the Israel lobby. In a March 2006 interview with The Harvard Crimson, Dershowitz called the article "one-sided" and its authors "liars" and "bigots". The next day, on MSNBC's Scarborough Country, he suggested the paper had been derived from multiple hate sites: "Every paragraph virtually is copied from a neo-Nazi Web site, from a radical Islamic Web site, from David Duke's Web site." Dershowitz subsequently wrote a report challenging the paper, arguing that it contained "three types of major errors: Quotations are wrenched out of context, important facts are misstated or omitted, and embarrassingly weak logic is employed." In a May 2006 letter in The London Review of Books, Mearsheimer and Walt denied that they had used any racist sources for their article, writing that Dershowitz had failed to offer any evidence to support his claim.

Robert Pfaltzgraff of the Institute for Foreign Policy Analysis questioned why Mearsheimer and Walt had suddenly arrived at completely different assumptions related to the Israel Lobby than that they had utilized for the rest of their career. Pfaltzgraff also denied their claim that "pro-Israeli forces" had established a "commanding presence" at the Institute for Foreign Policy Analysis.

Mearsheimer and Walt responded to their critics in the May issue. They denied that their essay was intended to propagate antisemitic conspiracy theories and claim that they never intended to solely blame Israel for America's problems in the Middle East. Mearsheimer and Walt insist they support Israel's survival and necessary steps to protect it. They fault Szanto for not recognizing that America's security ties with Western Europe, Japan and South Korea did not according to them depend on "strong domestic lobbies."

==== Scholarly ====
Benny Morris, a professor of Middle East history at Ben-Gurion University, prefaced his analysis with the remark: "Like many pro-Arab propagandists at work today, Mearsheimer and Walt often cite my own books, sometimes quoting directly from them, in apparent corroboration of their arguments. Yet their work is a travesty of the history that I have studied and written for the past two decades. Their work is riddled with shoddiness and defiled by mendacity."

Alan Dershowitz, at the time a professor at Harvard University, published an extended criticism of Mearsheimer's and Walt's position in his 2008 book, The Case Against Israel's Enemies: Exposing Jimmy Carter and Others Who Stand in the Way of Peace.

Robert C. Lieberman a Professor of Political Science at Columbia University, explores the book's thesis in his review; in his conclusion he writes "It is quite clear that the book’s argument does not support Mearsheimer and Walt’s central contention, that the existence and activities of an Israel lobby are the primary causes of American policy in the Middle East. The claim is supported neither by logic nor evidence nor even a rudimentary understanding of how the American policymaking system works."

==== Former government officials ====
Former Director of the CIA James Woolsey also wrote a strongly negative review, remarking that "... Reading [Walt and Mearsheimer's] version of events is like entering a completely different world." Woolsey contends the authors "are stunningly deceptive", and that a "commitment to distorting the historical record is the one consistent feature of this book", proceeding with a few examples.

Former Secretary of State Henry Kissinger said that the paper has not had "any great impact on the general public. The American public continues to support the relations [between the two countries], and resistance to any threat to the survival of Israel."

==== Jewish organizations ====
The American Jewish Committee's (AJC) executive director David A. Harris wrote several responses to the paper and the book. His 2007 article in the blog section of The Jerusalem Post discusses the difficulty Europeans have in understanding America's "special relationship" with Israel and the resulting eagerness of European publishers to fast track the book. "Although the book was panned by most American reviewers, it will serve as red meat for those eager to believe the worst about American decision-making regarding Israel and the Middle East." AJC also published several critiques of the paper, many of which were reproduced in newspapers around the world. AJC's antisemitism expert, Kenneth Stern, made the following argument against the paper: "Such a dogmatic approach blinds them from seeing what most Americans do. They seek to destroy the "moral" case for Israel by pointing at alleged Israeli misdeeds, rarely noting the terror and anti-Semitism that predicates Israeli reactions."

The Anti-Defamation League's (ADL) national director Abraham H. Foxman wrote a book in response to Mearsheimer and Walt's paper, entitled The Deadliest Lies: The Israel Lobby and the Myth of Jewish Control where he allegedly "demolishes a number of shibboleths . . . a rebuttal of a pernicious theory about a mythically powerful Jewish lobby." Former Secretary of State George Shultz wrote in the Foreword to the book, "... the notion. U.S. policy on Israel and Middle East is the result of their influence is simply wrong." The ADL also published an analysis of the paper, describing it as "amateurish and biased critique of Israel, American Jews, and American policy" and a "sloppy diatribe".

Other critical organizations and affiliated individuals include Dore Gold from the Jerusalem Center for Public Affairs, and Neal Sher of AIPAC.

==== Journalists ====
Those critical of the paper include Leslie H. Gelb of the New York Times; Caroline Glick of The Jerusalem Post; columnist Bret Stephens; and editor of Jewish Current Issues Rick Richman.

John Judis, a senior editor at The New Republic and a visiting scholar at the Carnegie Endowment for International Peace, wrote: "I think Walt and Mearsheimer do exaggerate the influence of the Israel lobby and define the lobby in such an inclusive way as to beg the question of its influence."

In a review in the Denver Post, Richard Cohen writes, "Where Israel is wrong, they say so. But where Israel is right, they are somehow silent. By the time you finish the book, you almost have to wonder why anyone in their right mind could find any reason to admire or like Israel. ... They had an observation worth making and a position worth debating. But their argument is so dry, so one-sided — an Israel lobby that leads America around by the nose — they suggest that not only do they not know Israel, they don't know America, either."

==== Scholarly reaction to the criticism ====
Harvard's Kennedy School removed its logo from the version of the Walt and Mearsheimer paper published on its website, and more strongly worded its disclaimer by making it more prominent, while insisting the paper reflected only the views of its authors. Harvard Kennedy School said in a statement: "The only purpose of that removal was to end public confusion; it was not intended, contrary to some interpretations, to send any signal that the school was also 'distancing' itself from one of its senior professors", and stated that they are committed to academic freedom and do not take a position on faculty conclusions and research. In their 79-page rebuttal to criticism of the original paper, former Harvard dean Walt says that it was his decision – not Harvard's – to remove the logo from the online Kennedy School version.

Mark Mazower, a professor of history at Columbia University, wrote that it is not possible to openly debate the topic of the article: "What is striking is less the substance of their argument than the outraged reaction: to all intents and purposes, discussing the US-Israel special relationship still remains taboo in the U.S. media mainstream. [...] Whatever one thinks of the merits of the piece itself, it would seem all but impossible to have a sensible public discussion in the U.S. today about the country's relationship with Israel."

Criticism of the paper was itself called "moral blackmail" and "bullying" by an opinion piece in the Financial Times: "Moral blackmail—the fear that any criticism of Israeli policy and U.S. support for it will lead to charges of anti-Semitism—is a powerful disincentive to publish dissenting views ... Bullying Americans into a consensus on Israeli policy is bad for Israel and makes it impossible for America to articulate its own national interest." The editorial praised the paper, remarking that "They argue powerfully that extraordinarily effective lobbying in Washington has led to a political consensus that American and Israeli interests are inseparable and identical."

==== Mearsheimer and Walt's response to the criticism ====
Mearsheimer stated, "[w]e fully recognised that the lobby would retaliate against us" and "[w]e expected the story we told in the piece would apply to us after it was published. We are not surprised that we've come under attack by the lobby." He also stated "we expected to be called anti-semites, even though both of us are philo-semites and strongly support the existence of Israel."

Mearsheimer and Walt responded to their critics in a letter to the London Review of Books in May 2006.

- To the accusation that they "see the lobby as a well-organised Jewish conspiracy," they point out that they refer to their description of the lobby "a loose coalition of individuals and organisations without a central headquarters."
- To the accusation of mono-causality, they remark "we also pointed out that support for Israel is hardly the only reason America's standing in the Middle East is so low."
- To the complaint that they "'catalog Israel's moral flaws' while paying little attention to the shortcomings of other states," they refer to the "high levels of material and diplomatic support" given by the United States especially to Israel as a reason to focus on it.
- To the claim that U.S. support for Israel reflects "genuine support among the American public" they agree but argue that "this popularity is substantially due to the lobby's success at portraying Israel in a favorable light and effectively limiting public awareness and discussion of Israel's less savory actions."
- To the claim that there are countervailing forces "such as 'paleo-conservatives, Arab and Islamic advocacy groups ... and the diplomatic establishment,'" they argue that these are no match for the lobby.
- To the argument that oil rather than Israel drives Middle East policy, they claim that if that were so, the United States would favor the Palestinians instead of Israel and would not have gone to war in Iraq or be threatening Iran.
- They accuse various critics of smearing them by linking them to racists, and dispute various claims by Alan Dershowitz and others that their facts, references or quotations are mistaken.

In December 2006 the authors privately circulated a 79-page rebuttal, "Setting the Record Straight: A Response to Critics of 'The Israel Lobby'".

In the book published in August 2007 the authors responded to criticisms leveled against them. They claimed that the vast majority of charges leveled against the original article were unfounded, but some critiques raised issues of interpretation and emphasis, which they addressed in the book.

== Debate ==
The London Review of Books organised a follow-up debate on the paper, moderated by Anne-Marie Slaughter, Dean of the Princeton School of Public and International Affairs (formerly known as the Woodrow Wilson School of Public and International Affairs) and a professor of Politics and International Affairs at Princeton University.

The panelists were John Mearsheimer; Shlomo Ben-Ami, former Israeli foreign and security minister and the author of Scars of War, Wounds of Peace: The Israeli-Arab Tragedy; Martin Indyk, director of the Saban Center for Middle East Policy, also Senior Fellow in Foreign Policy Studies at the Brookings Institution; Tony Judt, professor in European Studies and director of the Remarque Institute at New York University; Rashid Khalidi, professor of Arab Studies and Director of the Middle East Institute at Columbia University; and Dennis Ross of the Washington Institute for Near East Policy and the author of The Missing Peace: The Inside Story of the Fight for Middle East Peace.

A press conference was held after the debate.

The work generated fascination and interest in the question of Israel-US relations and other scholars were motivated to address the issue from different perspectives, including those who asserted that the relationship is much too complex to be discussed solely through the prism of the Israeli lobby.

== See also ==
- Israel lobby in the United States
- John Mearsheimer bibliography
- They Dare to Speak Out: People and Institutions Confront Israel's Lobby
- The Lobby
