= International Relations (journal) =

Quarterly peer-reviewed academic journal

- Discipline: International relations
- Language: English
- Edited by: Charalampos Efstathopoulos

Publication details
- History: 1960–present
- Publisher: SAGE Publications
- Frequency: Quarterly
- Open access: Hybrid
- Impact factor: 1.4 (2024)

Standard abbreviations
- ISO 4: Int. Relat.

Indexing
- ISSN: 0047-1178 (print); 1741-2862 (web)
- LCCN: 82004082
- OCLC no.: 60338295

Links
- Journal homepage; Online access; Online archive

International Relations is a quarterly peer-reviewed academic journal that covers the field of international relations. It publishes peer-reviewed research articles, and a mixture of review essays, interviews, debates and forums. The editor-in-chief is Charalampos Efstathopoulos (Aberystwyth University). The journal was established in 1960 and is published by SAGE Publications in association with the David Davies Memorial Institute.

== Abstracting and indexing ==
The journal is abstracted and indexed in:

- Current Contents/Social and Behavioral Sciences
- EBSCO databases
- International Bibliography of Periodical Literature
- Index Islamicus
- Scopus
- Social Sciences Citation Index

According to the Journal Citation Reports, the journal has a 2024 impact factor of 1.4.
