= Stephen Sestanovich =

American government official, academic and author

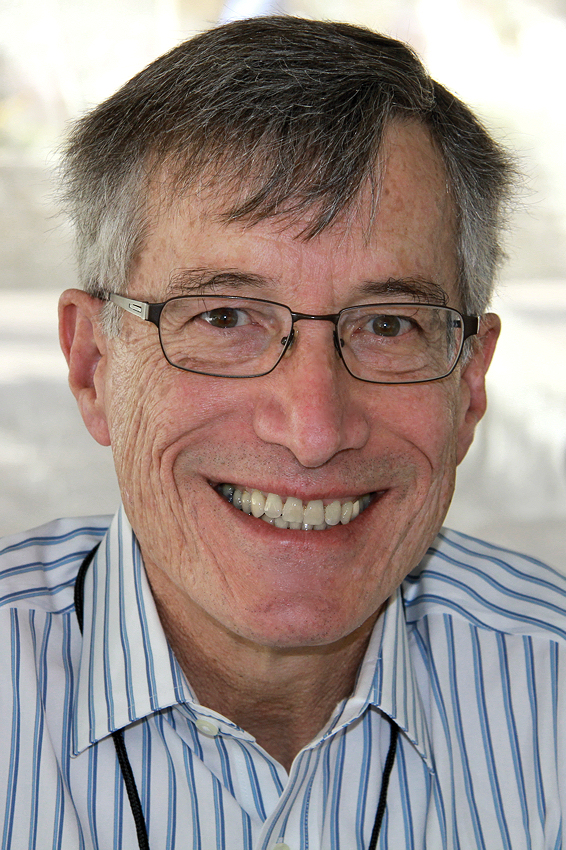
Sestanovich at the 2014 Texas Book Festival.

Stephen Rockwell Sestanovich (born June 8, 1950) is an American government official, academic, and author. He is the Kathryn and Shelby Cullom Davis Professor at the School of International and Public Affairs, Columbia University where he is the Director of the International Fellows Program. His areas of expertise include Russia and the former Soviet Union, the Caucasus and Central Asia, and U.S. foreign policy.

== Early life and education ==
Sestanovich was born in 1950. He has a brother, Ben, and had a sister, Mary (1952–2000). Their father, Stipe "Steve" Šestanović (1912–2014), was a journalist and Foreign Service officer born in Lumbarda on the island of Korčula, Austro-Hungarian Empire (now Croatia) to parents Cvita (née Lipanović) and Roko Šestanović. Roko left Korčula right before the start of World War I, and only in 1920 did the family reunite in the United States. Their mother, Molly Brown Sestanovich (1921–2014), was a journalist.

Sestanovich holds a B.A. from Cornell University (1972) and a Ph.D. in government from Harvard University (1978).

== Career ==
Sestanovich has held several government positions since 1980, including senior legislative assistant to U.S. Senator Daniel Patrick Moynihan (1980–81), policy planner for the U.S. Department of State during the Reagan Administration (1981–84), and senior director for policy development at the U.S. National Security Council (1984–87). He served as ambassador-at-large and special adviser to the secretary of state for the new independent states of the former Soviet Union under U.S. Secretary of State Madeleine Albright (1997–2001).

In addition to his teaching duties, Sestanovich is the George F. Kennan Senior Fellow for Russian and Eurasian Studies at the Council on Foreign Relations.

== Personal life ==
Sestanovich married Ann Hulbert in 1982. They have a son, Ben, who played baseball at Harvard and now serves as an Assistant General Manager for the Atlanta Braves, and a daughter, Clare, a novelist and short-story writer.

== Works ==
- Maximalist: America in the World from Truman to Obama, New York, 2014, ISBN 0307268179
