= Conventional Deterrence =

1983 book by John Mearsheimer

- Author: John Mearsheimer
- Language: English
- Subject: Cold War; deterrence theory
- Publisher: Cornell University Press
- Publication date: 31 August 1983
- Publication place: United States
- Pages: 296
- ISBN: 9780801415692

Conventional Deterrence is a 1983 book by American political scientist John Mearsheimer. It is about deterrence theory and aims to explain how a party may or may not choose to initiate a war depending on its expected costs, with analyses of cases from World War II and the Arab–Israeli conflict, and implications for the Cold War in Central Europe. According to Mearsheimer, failures in modern warfare most of the time happen when a party erroneously thinks a rapid and low-cost blitzkrieg is an available option.

Conventional Deterrence was published by Cornell University Press and was Mearsheimer's first book. Andrew P. Rasiulis called it well-researched and refreshing in its emphasis on conventional forces in a time when many other analysts overestimated the role of nuclear weapons. Rasiulis wrote that Mearsheimer disappointed by not analyzing the relationship between conventional forces, nuclear weapons and political goals. Patrick M. Morgan wrote that Mearsheimer had "devised a seemingly useful theory" for estimating NATO's ability to deter possible attacks from the Soviet Union in Central Europe.
