= The Chinese Journal of International Politics =

- Discipline: International relations
- Language: English
- Edited by: Liu Feng, Sun Xuefeng

Publication details
- History: 2006–present
- Publisher: Oxford University Press (United Kingdom)
- Frequency: Quarterly
- Impact factor: 3.0 (2023)

Standard abbreviations
- ISO 4: Chin. J. Int. Politics

Indexing
- ISSN: 1750-8916 (print); 1750-8924 (web)
- LCCN: 2007202849
- OCLC no.: 76903874

Links
- Journal homepage; Online access; Online archive

The Chinese Journal of International Politics is a quarterly peer-reviewed academic journal published by Oxford University Press covering the study of international relations based on modern methodology, historical studies, and policy-oriented research. Most of its articles are either related to China or have implications for Chinese foreign policy. It was established in 2006. The editors-in-chief are Liu Feng and Sun Xuefeng (Tsinghua University).

== Abstracting and indexing ==
The journal is abstracted and indexed in EBSCO databases, Social Sciences Citation Index, and Scopus. According to the Journal Citation Reports, it has a 2023 impact factor of 3.0.

== See also ==
- List of international relations journals
