= International Political Economy: An Intellectual History =

2008 book by Benjamin J. Cohen

- Cover
- Author: Benjamin J. Cohen
- Language: English
- Subject: International political economy
- Genre: Non-fiction
- Publisher: Princeton University Press
- Publication date: March 16, 2008
- Publication place: United States
- Media type: Print
- Pages: 224
- ISBN: 978-0-691-13569-4
- Preceded by: The Future of Money (2004)
- Followed by: The Future of Global Currency: The Euro Versus the Dollar (2011)

International Political Economy: An Intellectual History is a 2008 book by American political economist and author Benjamin J. Cohen. Cohen traces the development of international political economy (IPE) as an academic field. He outlines the origins, key figures, and major debates that shaped modern IPE from the 1970s onward, and he focuses on the contrasting approaches of the American and British schools. Cohen presents an overview of central themes in the field, such as systemic change, governance, and the role of the state, all while stressing the contributions of major influential scholars.

== Summary ==
Cohen traces the emergence and evolution of the academic field of international political economy (IPE). He studies how IPE developed as a recognized field of study from the early 1970s onward. Cohen goes through the pivotal intellectual contributions, debates, and institutional contexts that have shaped the field's trajectory.

He divides the narrative into seven chapters, beginning with an examination of what he terms the "American school" and the "British school" of IPE. The American school, centered largely in the United States, is characterized by its adherence to positivist, empirical methodologies and a focus on midlevel theory and state-centric analysis. Cohen attributes much of its early development to the work of scholars such as Robert Keohane, Robert Gilpin, and Stephen Krasner. The British school, however,—associated with figures like Susan Strange and Robert Cox—places greater emphasis on normative concerns, historical context, and interdisciplinary engagement, drawing more from sociology, history, and critical theory.

Cohen then identifies three central themes that have formed the basis for theoretical development in the field: systemic transformation, system governance, and the role of the state.

The chapter on systemic transformation investigates the question of how global economic systems change over time. Cohen, here, underlines debates such as hegemonic stability theory. The discussion on system governance addresses the so-called "control gap" in an interdependent world economy, where state capabilities may no longer match the scale of global challenges. The chapter on the state investigates its conceptual place in IPE, contrasting American state-centric approaches with the British school's broader institutional and social frameworks.

In later chapters, Cohen reflects on what the field has learned. He also assesses both its achievements and limitations. Cohen argues that while IPE has generated a wide range of theoretical frameworks, it has not arrived at a unified or consensual body of knowledge. He then advocates for "new bridges"—not only between economics and politics but also between different methodological and epistemological approaches within the field itself.

== Reviews ==
In his review, American political scientist Andrew Sobel viewed the book as a valuable contribution to understanding the evolution of international political economy. Sobel said the author focused primarily on what he called the "magnificent seven," using them to outline the foundations of the American and British schools, but observed that "descriptions of more recent generations of scholarship are far less thorough." Sobel acknowledged the book's utility in addressing the fragmentation of the field, though he argued that the author "is overly generous about their complementarity," referring to the two schools. Sobel mentioned that dialogue between the American and British traditions had become increasingly limited, describing the situation as a "dialogue of the deaf." While he credited the book for connecting early developments to current trends, he suggested that the contributions of later scholars now define the field and may warrant "a second volume."

Bill Dunn, of Kingston University London, described the book as a concise and engaging introduction to the development of international political economy, a work written with "an insider’s knowledge both of the theories and the theorists." Dunn observed that while the author affirmed the benefits of methodological rigor associated with the American school, "this is precisely what the British school, as he describes it, would deny." He thought Cohen offered a serious and influential account of the field's evolution, though it required critical engagement due to its selective framing of debates and categories.

David Tyfield, of Lancaster University, described the book as "erudite and accessible" but questioned whether its central call for bridge-building between traditions genuinely addressed their deep conceptual differences. Tyfield argued that the Cohen's appeal for theoretical consensus and admiration for positivist rigor revealed "just how deeply his whole approach remains within the American school." He also suggested that scholars in the British tradition would likely reject the author's preference for methodological unity, particularly the idea that "no one can deny the benefits of creeping economism."

Joel R. Campbell praised the book as "superbly written," entertaining and informative. He commended its clear structure and emphasis on major figures who helped shape the field, noting that each of them "deserves a full-length intellectual biography." He also lauded the treatment of key theoretical developments, especially Cohen's discussion of hegemonic stability theory, which he called "a particularly strong chapter."

Australian political scientist John Minns pointed out to the author's unique qualifications, and cited decades of scholarly involvement and close acquaintance with many of the field's key theorists. Minns described the book as a "useful and, to those immersed in the field, quite fascinating history of IPE." He praised the treatment of historical context and theoretical developments, writing that: "Cohen carefully links… shifts in world politics and economics to the rise and fall of IPE paradigms."

Mina Baliamoune-Lutz welcomed the clear exposition of the American and British schools and said that it inspired her to further study the work of the featured scholars. While suggesting some areas for expansion, such as globalization and the role of emerging powers, she affirmed that the book "will inspire people to ponder" key contemporary questions and promote new theoretical developments. Baliamoune-Lutz considered it as "excellent" book written in an "engaging and witty style".
