= New political economy =

New Political Economy (NPE) is a relatively recent sub-school within the field of political economy. NPE scholars treat economic ideologies as the relevant phenomena to be explained by political economy. Thus, Charles S. Maier suggests that a political economy approach: "interrogates economic doctrines to disclose their sociological and political premises [...] in sum, [it] regards economic ideas and behavior not as frameworks for analysis, but as beliefs and actions that must themselves be explained". This approach shapes Andrew Gamble's The Free Economy and the Strong State (Palgrave Macmillan, 1988), and Colin Hay's The Political Economy of New Labour (Manchester University Press, 1999). It also guides much work published in New Political Economy, an international journal founded by Sheffield University scholars in 1996.

Matthew Watson with Richard Higgott, in explicit response to Benjamin Cohen's approach, seek to move International Political Economy away from Cohen's division of the subject into American and British camps, and to promote their own vision of a New Political Economy. They propose:

1. Transgresses conventional social science boundaries.
2. Explicitly rejects the loaded connotations of the 'rigour' that Cohen espouses, as this engenders unhelpful methodological competition.
3. Resists the abstractionism of postmodernism in favour of the progressive principle that life might be made better.

This ‘new political economy’ attempts to combine the approach of the classical political economists (from Smith to Marx) with more recent "analytical advances". Authors adopting this approach include Gamble (1996), Watson himself, and a series of authors in the work edited by Higgott and Payne (2000). The approach "rejects the old dichotomies – between agency and structure, between ideas and material interests, and between states and markets". The approach seeks to make explicit the normative assumptions that lie behind its analysis, and to be a "hosting metaphor" that will encourage political debate about societal preferences. It considers that different levels of abstraction are needed to "deeply ground" work in historical, cultural and social detail, thereby fostering a 'real world' political economy able to explain the influence of social meanings - of both actions and objects - on economic choices.

Watson and Higgott argue that practitioners of this approach are gradually increasing in number. They note the prevalence of NPE not only among "Third World economic nationalists and academic critics of the neo-liberal policy agenda who find little comfort in the turn instead to anti-foundationalist theories associated with postmodernism", but also among many "mainstream" economists who have become disillusioned with neoclassical theory. In this second category they list Dani Rodrik (1998), Paul Krugman (1999) and Joseph Stiglitz (2002).

== See also ==
- Constitutional economics
- Political economy
- Public choice theory
