= Benjamin Cohen (political economist) =

American political economist

- Born: Benjamin Jerry Cohen; June 5, 1937 (age 89); Ossining, New York

Education
- Education: Columbia University

Philosophical work
- Institutions: University of California, Santa Barbara; Tufts University; Princeton University; Federal Reserve Bank of New York
- Main interests: International political economy
- Notable ideas: British and American camps of international political economy

Benjamin Jerry Cohen (born June 5, 1937, in Ossining, New York) is the Louis G. Lancaster Professor of International Political Economy at the University of California, Santa Barbara. At UCSB, where he has been a member of the faculty since 1991, he teaches undergraduate and graduate courses on international political economy.

== Education ==
Cohen finished his undergraduate degree in 1959 and his doctorate degree in 1963, both in Economics, at Columbia University.

From 1962 to 1964 Cohen was a research economist at the Federal Reserve Bank of New York. From 1964 to 1971 he was an assistant professor in the Economics department at Princeton University. Cohen had been a member of the faculty at Tufts University since 1971 and until he joined the faculty at UCSB he was the William L. Clayton Professor of International Economic Affairs at the Fletcher School of Law and Diplomacy, Tufts University.

== Research interest ==
His research interests mainly involve issues of international monetary and financial relations, and he has written about matters ranging from exchange rates and monetary integration to financial markets and international debt. But a central focus of his work is the political analysis of currencies. In Geography and the Future of money, Cohen began with what Susan Strange had begun: the currency pyramid. Cohen's work focused then on the denationalization of the currency or the monetary integration begun by the Economic and Monetary Union of the European Union. The denationalization of the currency was a leaflet by Friedrich Hayek and others: the Pélérin Society and the Bellagio Group that constructed the European Currency Unit and later the euro as a pedestal of monetary federalism or to get the currency out of the hands of politicians. Cohen argues that a currency is in need of a state, developing after the currency pyramid the Westephalian model of money/ The core of this thinking is that the currency is the heart of a state's sovereignty, thus protected from interference from outside and thus a political construct.

In Currency Power Cohen began to analyse the necessary power attributes in designing an international currency and what is benefits are. Surely, the dollar is here the example, but he also gives a clear picture about the euro and the yuan. Other concepts he has designed are the power to deflect and the power to delay. Those benefits states has with issuing an international currency in the realm of international finance: whilst the former is to deflect the adjustment burden on to other, the latter refers to the delay of the adjustment. An adjustment in international finance flows down the hill: creditors have leverage on debtors to design the international outcome. Debtors have to adjust but with an international currency as is the dollar, power is made in international finance.

In Currency Statecraft Cohen develops the thesis that great powers have great currencies. He states the life cycle of top currencies building on history such as the development and decline of the pound, the Deutschmark or the yen (youth, maturity, decline and death). Only the dollar still reigns supreme, the euro is an not unleashed power having failed the ambition of their creators. The yuan is the competitor of the dollar, symbolizing the growing economic power of China. The internationalization of the euro and the yuan had as purpose to diminish the power of the dollar in the international monetary system. The power of the dollar is summarized by Richard Nixon: 'the dollar is our currency but everyone else's problem'. Furthermore, inertia favours the dollar.

== An intellectual history of IPE ==
Cohen has also written on the history of IPE. In his Introduction to International Political Economy: An Intellectual History, Cohen traces the genesis and development of the rapidly growing field of international political economy. He documents the work of the key pioneers of the discipline: Robert W. Cox, Robert Gilpin, Peter Katzenstein, Robert Keohane, Charles Kindleberger, Stephen Krasner and Susan Strange and he charts the development of IPE from these foundations to the present.

At the heart of the book is a depiction of IPE being divided into American and British camps. The Americans are being positivists and attempting to develop intermediate level theories that are supported by some form of quantitative evidence. The work asserts that British IPE is more "interpretivist" and looks for "grand theories" and that they use very different standards of empirical work. Cohen sees benefits in both approaches.

This characterisation of IPE has been hotly debated. One forum for this was the "2008 Warwick RIPE Debate: ‘American’ versus ‘British’ IPE" where Cohen, Mark Blyth, Richard Higgott, and Matthew Watson followed up on the recent exchange in RIPE. Higgott and Watson in particular, are querying the appropriateness of Cohen's categories.

== Bibliography ==
- Balance-of-Payments Policy (1969)
- The Future of Sterling as an International Currency (1971)
- The Question of Imperialism: The Political Economy of Dominance and Dependence (1973)
- Organizing the World's Money: The Political Economy of International Monetary Relations (1977)
- The Geography of Money (1998)
- The Future of Money (2004)
- International Political Economy: An Intellectual History (2008)
- The Future of Global Currency: The Euro Versus the Dollar (2011)
- Currency Power: Understanding Monetary Rivalry (2015)
- Currency Statecraft: Monetary Rivalry and Geopolitical Ambition (2018)
- Dream States: A Lurking Nightmare for World Order (2025)
