= Political economy =

Study of the development of social production

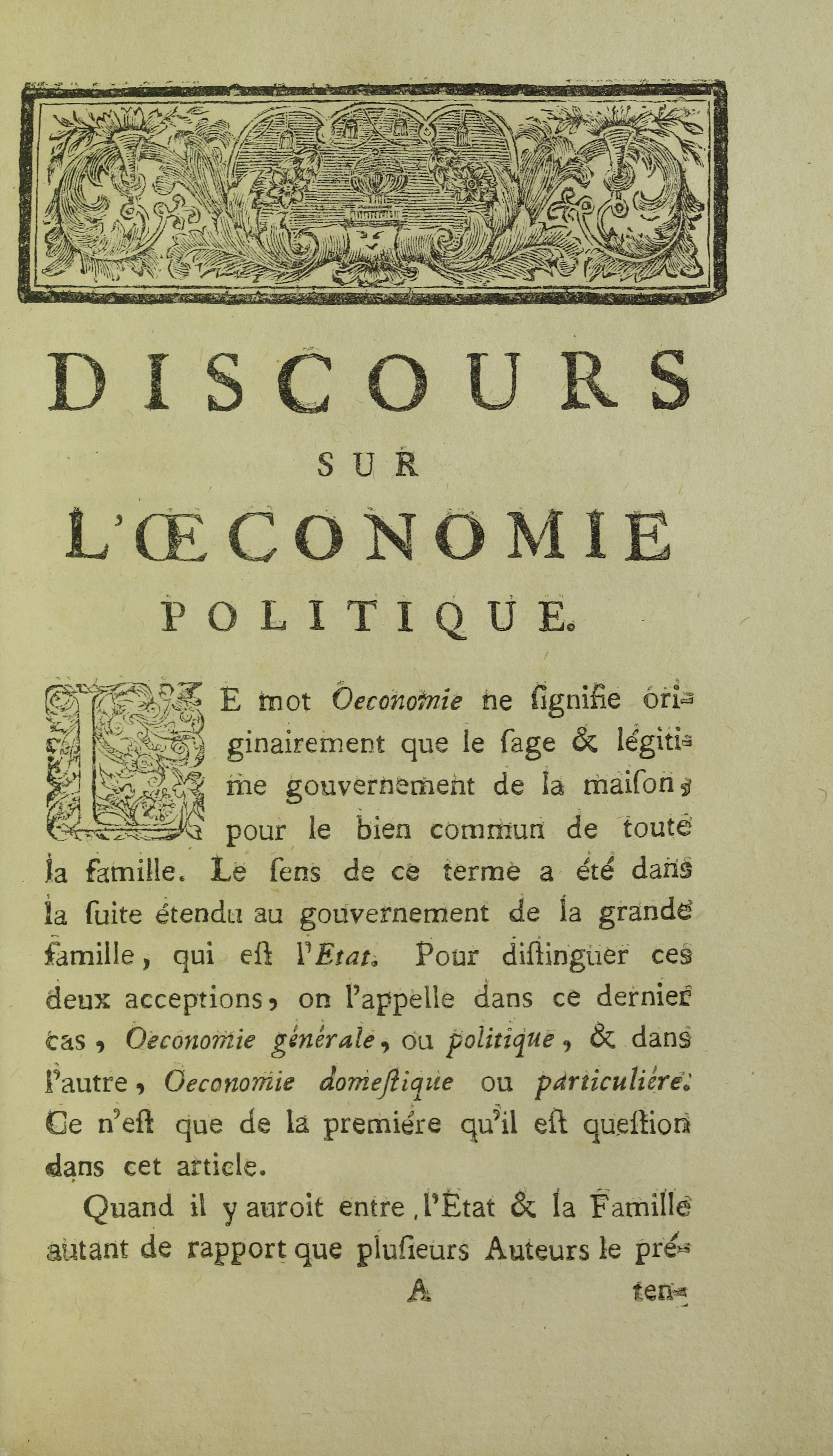
Jean-Jacques Rousseau, Discours sur l'oeconomie politique, 1758

Political economy – sometimes referred to as comparative economy – is an interdisciplinary field in political science and economics that studies the relationship between political and economic systems, including how they influence each other.

The field originated within the 16th-century Western moral philosophy, with theoretical works exploring the administration of states' wealth. The earliest works of political economy are usually attributed to the British scholars Adam Smith, Thomas Malthus, and David Ricardo, although the work of the French physiocrats preceded them. Various thinkers, from John Stuart Mill to Karl Marx, saw economics and politics as inseparable.

By the mid-18th century, political economy emerged as a distinct field, encompassing the study of phenomena that is now categorised under economics. In the late-19th century, economics had become an independent discipline separate from political economy with the rise of mathematical modeling, coinciding with the publication of the influential textbook Principles of Economics by Alfred Marshall in 1890.

In its modern form, political economy is an interdisciplinary field analyzing phenomena such as labour markets, international trade, growth, the distribution of wealth, and economic inequality. In contrast, the term economics usually refers to the narrow study of the economy absent other political and social considerations.

== Etymology and history ==
=== Origins ===
Before economics became a separate modern discipline, the term originally referred to household or estate management and originated from the Greek word oikonomikos, whose definition is "practiced in the management of a household or family". Political economy originally extended that idea to the level of the state, which involved the management of wealth, production, trade, taxation, and subsistence at the national level.

The phrase économie politique (translated into English as "political economy") first appeared in France in 1615 with the book Traicté de l'oeconomie politique by French soldier-economist Antoine de Montchrétien.

In Adam Smith's The Wealth of Nations, Smith described political economy as part of the "science of a statesman or legislator" whose goals were to provide revenue or subsistence for the people and revenue for the state.

Other contemporary scholars attribute the roots of this study to the 14th century Tunisian historian and sociologist, Ibn Khaldun, for his work on making the distinction between "profit" and "sustenance." He also calls for the creation of a science to explain society and goes on to outline these ideas in his major work, the Muqaddimah. In Al-Muqaddimah, Khaldun states, "Civilization and its well-being, as well as business prosperity, depend on productivity and people's efforts in all directions in their own interest and profit" – seen as a modern precursor to Classical economic thought.

The French physiocrats (including François Quesnay, Richard Cantillon and Anne-Robert-Jacques Turgot) were the first major exponents of political economy, although the intellectual responses of Adam Smith, John Stuart Mill, David Ricardo, Henry George and Karl Marx to the physiocrats generally receive much greater attention in contemporary discourse.

=== Redefinition and relationship with economics ===
By the late 18th century, themes that are now associated with economics—including "core principles and laws pertaining to money, markets, and trade"—had been solidified into a discourse that had come to be known as political economy.

However, in the late 19th century, economics increasingly tried to become a more autonomous, technical, and often mathematical discipline. In his work A General Mathematical Theory of Political Economy, William Stanley Jevons developed the marginal utility theory of value—sparking the "marginal revolution" and introducing mathematical methods in economics—and advocated economics for brevity and with the hope of the term becoming "the recognised name of a science".

In the book From Political Economy to Economics, authors Milonakis and Fine argue that "the process by which political economy became economics" involved "desocialisation and dehistoricisation" and that this involved "the separation of economics from the other social sciences at the beginning of the twentieth century." They also critique the "marginal revolution" as pioneered by William Stanley Jevons, adding that the move from political economy to economics gave the discipline a rationale for developing independently of other social disciplines.

At about the same time, political science was also becoming its own autonomous academic discipline separate from history and political economy. Additionally, Alfred Marshall's Principles of Economics (published 1890) argued that the field was "better described" as economics than by the "narrower term" political economy.

On the "marginalist revolution", Michael Bernstein explains that the intellectual roots of modern economics can be traced back to "the moral philosophy of the eighteenth and nineteenth centuries"—the tradition that included classical political economy—and argues that the marginalist-neoclassical turn allowed economists to break with that heritage and construct a "distinctly professional knowledge".

Historians of economic thought therefore treat the late-19th-century marginalist and early neoclassical turn as part of the broader transformation of "political economy" into "economics," which is a narrower and more mathematical discipline that is separated from history, politics, and other social sciences. The term "economics" gradually displaced "political economy" as the mainstream name of the discipline, especially after Marshall's Principles of Economics in 1890.

Citation measurement metrics from Google Ngram Viewer indicate that use of the term economics began to overshadow political economy around roughly 1910, becoming the preferred term for the discipline by 1920.

==== Contemporary definition ====
In the contemporary context, the definition of political economy has changed. Contrary to the modern terms of economics and political science, political economy now refers to the interdisciplinary study of the mutual relationship between politics and economics, that is:

- How the state, legal systems, and institutions shape markets and economic outcomes; and,
- How markets, wealth, firms, and economic interests shape politics (including the state).

The field is also sometimes split into comparative political economy and international political economy. The former analyses the interactions between the market and the state within countries, while the latter focuses on global interactions between politics and economics.

=== Educational institutions ===
The world's first professorship in political economy was established in 1754 at the University of Naples Federico II in southern Italy. The Neapolitan philosopher Antonio Genovesi was Italy's first professor of political economy. In 1763, Joseph von Sonnenfels was appointed a Political Economy chair at the University of Vienna, Austria. Thomas Malthus, in 1805, became England's first professor of political economy, at the East India Company College, Haileybury, Hertfordshire. At present, political economy refers to different yet related approaches to studying economic and related behaviours, ranging from the combination of economics with other fields to the use of fundamental assumptions that challenge earlier economic assumptions.

== Approaches ==
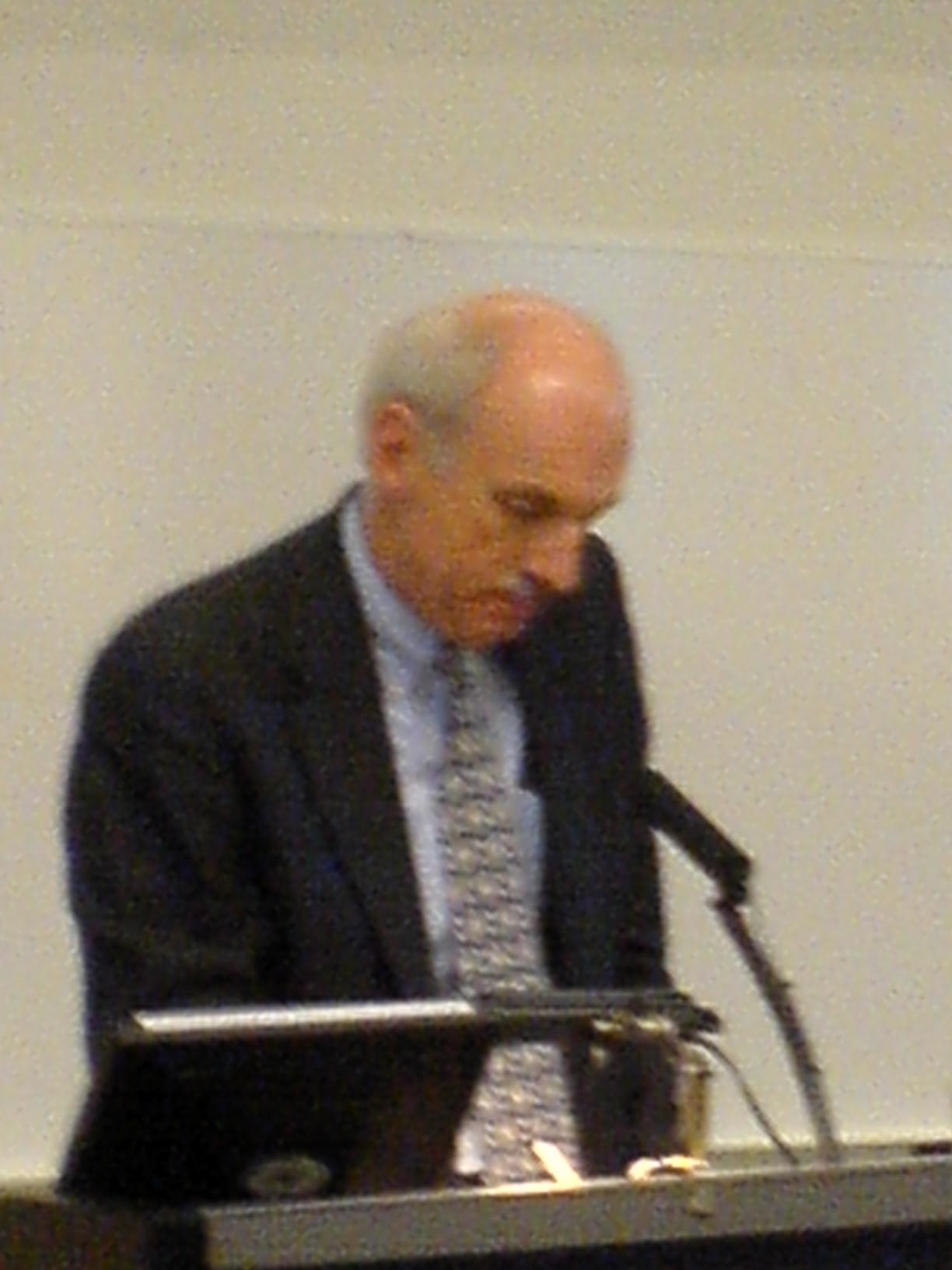
Robert Keohane, an international relations theorist

Political economy most commonly refers to interdisciplinary studies drawing upon economics, sociology and political science in explaining how political institutions, the political environment, and the economic system – capitalist, socialist, communist, or mixed – influence each other. The Journal of Economic Literature classification codes associate political economy with three sub-areas: (1) the role of government and/or class and power relationships in resource allocation for each type of economic system; (2) international political economy, which studies the economic impacts of international relations; and (3) economic models of political or exploitative class processes. Within political science, a general distinction is made between international political economy typically examined by scholars of international relations and comparative political economy, which scholars of comparative politics primarily study.

Social choice theory studies how utilities of individuals combine across society, also called the social welfare function, depending on political structure. Public choice theory is a microfoundations theory closely intertwined with political economy. Both approaches model voters, politicians, and bureaucrats as behaving in mainly self-interested ways. Economists and political scientists often associate political economy with approaches that use rational-choice assumptions, especially in game theory and in examining phenomena beyond economics' standard remit, such as government failure and complex decision making in which context the term "positive political economy" is common. Other "traditional" topics include analysis of such public policy issues as economic regulation, monopoly, rent-seeking, market protection, institutional corruption and distributional politics. Empirical analysis includes the influence of elections on the choice of economic policy, determinants and forecasting models of electoral outcomes, the political business cycles, central-bank independence and the politics of excessive deficits. An interesting example would be the publication in 1954 of the first manual of Political Economy in the Soviet Union, edited by Lev Gatovsky, which mixed the classic theoretical approach of the time with the soviet political discourse.

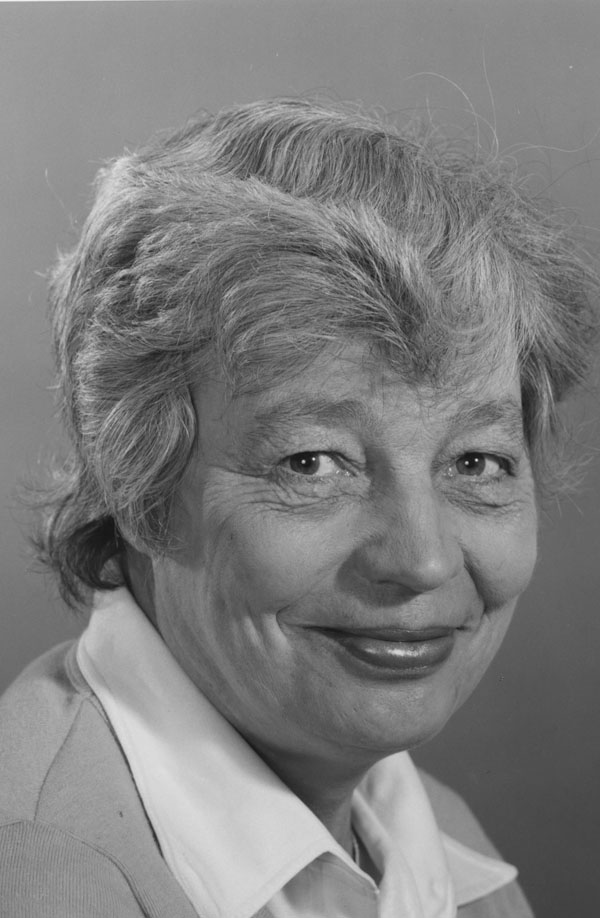
Susan Strange, an international relations scholar

A rather recent focus has been put on modeling economic policy and political institutions concerning interactions between agents and economic and political institutions, including the seeming discrepancy of economic policy and economist's recommendations through the lens of transaction costs. From the mid-1990s, the field has expanded, in part aided by new cross-national data sets allowing tests of hypotheses on comparative economic systems and institutions. Topics have included the breakup of nations, the origins and rate of change of political institutions in relation to economic growth, development, financial markets and regulation, the importance of institutions, backwardness, reform and transition economies, the role of culture, ethnicity and gender in explaining economic outcomes, macroeconomic policy, the environment, fairness and the relation of constitutions to economic policy, theoretical and empirical.

Other important landmarks in the development of political economy include:

- New political economy, which may treat economic ideologies as the phenomenon to explain, per the traditions of Marxian political economy. Thus, Charles S. Maier suggests that a political economy approach "interrogates economic doctrines to disclose their sociological and political premises.... in sum, [it] regards economic ideas and behavior not as frameworks for analysis, but as beliefs and actions that must themselves be explained". This approach informs Andrew Gamble's The Free Economy and the Strong State (Palgrave Macmillan, 1988), and Colin Hay's The Political Economy of New Labour (Manchester University Press, 1999). It also informs much work published in New Political Economy, an international journal founded by Sheffield University scholars in 1996.
- International political economy (IPE) is an interdisciplinary field comprising approaches to the actions of various actors. According to International Relations scholar Chris Brown, University of Warwick professor, Susan Strange, was "almost single-handedly responsible for creating international political economy as a field of study." In the United States, these approaches are associated with the journal International Organization, which in the 1970s became the leading journal of IPE under the editorship of Robert Keohane, Peter J. Katzenstein and Stephen Krasner. They are also associated with the journal The Review of International Political Economy. There is also a more critical school of IPE, inspired by thinkers such as Antonio Gramsci and Karl Polanyi; two major figures are Matthew Watson and Robert W. Cox.
- The use of a political economy approach by anthropologists, sociologists, and geographers is used in reference to the regimes of politics or economic values that emerge primarily at the level of states or regional governance, but also within smaller social groups and social networks. Because these regimes influence and are influenced by the organization of both social and economic capital, the analysis of dimensions lacking a standard economic value (e.g. the political economy of language, of gender, or of religion) often draws on concepts used in Marxian critiques of capital. Such approaches expand on neo-Marxist scholarship on development and underdevelopment advanced by André Gunder Frank and Immanuel Wallerstein.
- Historians have employed political economy to explore the ways in the past that persons and groups with common economic interests have used politics and various forms of zero-sum thinking to effect changes beneficial to their interests.
- Political economy and law is a recent attempt within legal scholarship to engage explicitly with political economy literature. In the 1920s and 1930s, legal realists (e.g., Robert Hale) and intellectuals (e.g., John Commons) engaged with themes related to political economy. In the second half of the 20th century, lawyers associated with the Chicago School incorporated certain intellectual traditions from economics. However, since the crisis in 2007, legal scholars, especially in international law, have increasingly engaged with the debates, methodologies, and themes within political economy texts.
- Thomas Piketty's approach and call to action, which advocated for the reintroduction of political consideration and political science knowledge more generally into the discipline of economics as a way of improving the robustness of the discipline and remedying its shortcomings, which had become clear following the 2008 financial crisis.
- In 2010, the only Department of Political Economy in the United Kingdom was formally established at King's College London. The rationale for this academic unit was that "the disciplines of Politics and Economics are inextricably linked", and that it was "not possible to properly understand political processes without exploring the economic context in which politics operates".
- In 2012, the Sheffield Political Economy Research Institute (SPERI) was founded at The University of Sheffield by professors Tony Payne and Colin Hay. It was created to combine political and economic analyses of capitalism, which the founders viewed as insufficient as independent disciplines for explaining the 2008 financial crisis.
- In 2017, the Political Economy UK Group (abbreviated PolEconUK) was established as a research consortium in the field of political economy. It hosts an annual conference and counts among its member institutions Oxford, Cambridge, King's College London, Warwick University and the London School of Economics.

== Relationship between politics and the economy ==
Many political thinkers, both historical and contemporary, have warned that concentrated economic power in the hands of certain economic actors (such as monopolies) can distort political democracy:

- Aristotle, in Politics, argued that every régime tends to be captured by the interests of whichever class rules it. Oligarchy, in his view, becomes rule by the rich for their interests. He warned that extreme inequality destroys self-government and that the rich dominate institutions and laws when wealth becomes too concentrated. In his view, the best safeguard was therefore a large middle-class because it reduces domination by either rich oligarchs or by desperate masses.
- Adam Smith, in The Wealth of Nations (1776), warned that businesspeople frequently seek monopoly, collusion, and state favourtism. He wrote that sector groups seldom socialise without concocting "a conspiracy against the public". Smith believed that while markets increase prosperity, economic élites tend to seek monopoly and in doing so gain economic power as well as political power.
- Karl Marx argued that the state in a capitalist society is not merely influenced by economic interests, nor is it a neutral arbiter between classes. He argued that economic power ultimately dominates political power and that capitalism and democracy are inherently at odds because one-person-one-vote is not necessarily able to address economic inequality nor restrict the control that the bourgeoisie has on society. In The Communist Manifesto (1848), he stated that "the executive of the modern state is but a committee for managing the common affairs of the whole bourgeoisie."
- Noam Chomsky also argues that modern democracies are heavily shaped by concentrated corporate and financial power, especially through media-ownership, lobbying, and campaign finance.

Some politicians concentrate public attention on economics rather than on other issues in society — as summarised in the 1992 slogan "It's the economy, stupid".

== Related disciplines ==
Because political economy is not a unified discipline, studies are using the term that overlap in subject matter, but have radically different perspectives:

- Politics studies power relations and their relationship to achieving desired ends.
- Philosophy rigorously assesses and studies a set of beliefs and their applicability to reality.
- Economics studies the distribution of resources so that the material wants of a society are satisfied, enhancing societal well-being.
- Sociology studies the effects of persons' involvement in society as members of groups and how that changes their ability to function. In Marx’s theory of history, material life conditions social life, so explanation proceeds primarily from material production to social forms. Marx's theories on political economy are contained in his book Das Kapital.
- Anthropology studies political economy by investigating regimes of political and economic value that condition tacit aspects of sociocultural practices (e.g., the pejorative use of pseudo-Spanish expressions in the U.S. entertainment media) by means of broader historical, political, and sociological processes. Analyses of structural features of transnational processes focus on the interactions between the world capitalist system and local cultures.
- Archaeology attempts to reconstruct past political economies by examining the material evidence for administrative strategies to control and mobilize resources. This evidence may include architecture, animal remains, evidence for craft workshops, evidence for feasting and ritual, evidence for the import or export of prestige goods, or evidence for food storage.
- Psychology is the fulcrum on which political economy exerts its force in studying decision making (not only in prices), but as the field of study whose assumptions model political economy.
- Geography studies political economy within the wider geographical studies of human-environment interactions, wherein economic actions of humans transform the natural environment. Apart from these, attempts have been made to develop a geographical political economy that prioritises commodity production and "spatialities" of capitalism.
- History documents change, often using it to argue political economy; some historical works take political economy as the narrative's frame.
- Ecology deals with political economy because human activity has the greatest effect upon the environment, its central concern being the environment's suitability for human activity. The ecological effects of economic activity spur research on changing market economy incentives. Additionally and more recently, ecological theory has been used to examine economic systems as similar systems of interacting species (e.g., firms).
- Cultural studies examines social class, production, labor, race, gender, and sex.
- Communications examines the institutional aspects of media and telecommunication systems. As an area of study focusing on aspects of human communication, it pays particular attention to the relationships among owners, labor, consumers, advertisers, structures of production, and the state, as well as the power dynamics embedded in these relationships.

== Journals ==
- Constitutional Political Economy.
- Economics & Politics. ISSN 0954-1985
- European Journal of Political Economy.
- Latin American Perspectives.
- International Journal of Political Economy
- Journal of Australian Political Economy. ISSN 0156-5826
- New Political Economy.
- Review of International Political Economy
- Public Choice.
- Studies in Political Economy.

== See also ==
- Constitutional economics – Research program in economics and constitutionalism
- Critique of political economy – Social critique
- Economic ideology – Set of views forming an ideology on the economy
- Economic sociology – Branch of sociology
- Economic study of collective action – Action taken together by a group of people to further a common objective
- European Association for Evolutionary Political Economy (EAEPE)
- Government debt – Total amount of debt owed to lenders by a government/state
- Important publications in political economy
- Institutional economics – Economics that focuses on institutions
- Land value tax – Levy on the unimproved value of land
- Law of rent – Economic principle regarding the value of rented land
- Marxian political economy – School of economic thought
- Perspectives on capitalism by school of thought
- Political ecology – Study of political, economic and social factors about environmental issues
- Political economy in anthropology – Application of political economy methods to anthropological study
- Social capital – Networks of relationships among people who live and work in a particular society
- Social welfare model
- Surplus economics
- Welfare economics – Field of economics to evaluate well-being
