= Globalizations =

- Discipline: Political science, global politics, political economy
- Language: English
- Edited by: Barry K. Gills

Publication details
- History: 2004-present
- Publisher: Taylor & Francis
- Frequency: 7/year
- Impact factor: 1.614 (2019)

Standard abbreviations
- ISO 4: Globalizations

Indexing
- ISSN: 1474-7731 (print); 1474-774X (web)
- LCCN: 2004262351
- OCLC no.: 962365006

Links
- Journal homepage; Online access; Online archive

Globalizations is a peer-reviewed academic journal covering global politics and international political economy. It was established in 2004 and is published by Taylor & Francis. The editor-in-chief is Barry K. Gills (University of Helsinki).

== Abstracting and indexing ==
The journal is abstracted and indexed in:

- EBSCOhost
- International Bibliography of the Social Sciences
- Sociological Abstracts
- CSA Worldwide Political Science Abstracts
- PAIS International
- Social Sciences Citation Index.

According to the Journal Citation Reports, the journal has a 2019 impact factor of 1.614.
