= Barry K. Gills =

US-born academic

- Born: 22 May 1956 (age 70); Washington D.C.

Academic background
- Education: London School of Economics
- Thesis: The determination of international status: The case of Korea in modern international relations (1995)
- Influences: Immanuel Wallerstein, Andre Gunder Frank

Academic work
- Sub-discipline: World systems theory

Barry Keith Gills (born 22 May 1956) is a US-born political economist and sociologist who is Professor of Global Development Studies at the Faculty of Social Sciences, University of Helsinki. He completed a Master's degree at the University of Hawaiʻi at Mānoa in 1983 and a PhD at the London School of Economics in 1995. He was a co-founding editor of the journals Review of International Political Economy and Globalizations, the latter of which he is editor-in-chief. He has served on the editorial board of Third World Quarterly since 1992. Between 2006 and 2013 he was Professor in Politics Department at Newcastle University. In 2019 he received the James N. Rosenau Achievement Award from the International Studies Association for his work related to globalization.
