= Simon Sweeney =

Dr Simon Sweeney is a professor of International Political Economy in the School for Business and Society at the University of York.

== Early life ==
Sweeney completed a Master of Arts (MA) in Linguistics and ELT at the University of York in 1990 and later a PhD in EU common security and defence policy at the University of Leeds in 2015.

== Lecturing ==
Simon Sweeney (PhD, Leeds) is Professor of International Political Economy and Business in the School for Business and Society at York. He was formerly at Sheffield Business School, Sheffield Hallam University, and York St. John University. He lectures in IPE and International Business.

== Writing ==
Sweeney's writing includes work on European integration, security and defence, and on pedagogy. He is the author of 'Europe, the State and Globalisation' (Longman, 2005, Routledge, 2014) now extensively re-written and updated as 'European Union in the Global Context' (Routledge, 2024).

He is widely published on Higher Education and internationalisation, the European Higher Education Area, and the Bologna Process. He also writes on HE pedagogy, and the student experience. His research is mostly on the European Union, and security and defence. He writes for various thinktanks, especially UK in a Changing Europe (King's College London) and the DCU Brexit Institute (Dublin City University). He has written reports on the internationalisation of higher education, the European Higher Education Area and the Bologna Process, available from the Higher Education Academy.

He is a Senior Fellow of the Higher Education Academy (Advance HE/HEA) and a Certified Management and Business Educator (Chartered Association of Business Schools).

== Selected publications ==
For details visit ORCID

Or Simon Sweeney - School for Business and Society, University of York
