= Robert W. Cox =

Canadian political scientist and UN officer (1926–2018)

Robert Warburton Cox CM (1926 – October 9, 2018) was a Canadian scholar of International Political Economy and a former United Nations officer. He was cited as one of the intellectual leaders, along with Susan Strange, of the British School International Political Economy and was still active as a scholar after his formal retirement, writing and giving occasional lectures. He was professor emeritus of political science and social and political thought at York University.

He started work at the International Labour Organization in Geneva, Switzerland in 1947, eventually serving as director of their then independent International Institute for Labour Studies (1965–71). During his directorship he was appointed Professor at the University of Geneva's Graduate Institute of International Studies which allowed him to hold seminars there and supervise Ph.D. students. Following his departure from the ILO he taught at Columbia University. From 1977 to 1992 he was professor of political science at York University in Toronto, Canada. He was made a member of the Order of Canada in 2014.

== Biography ==
Born in Montreal, Quebec, Cox graduated in 1946 from McGill University in Montreal, where he received a master's degree in history. Following his graduation, he worked for the International Labour Organization (ILO), where he would remain for a quarter century, helping to set up and design the International Institute for Labor Studies.

In his academic career, Cox was known for his fierce independence and unwavering challenge of orthodoxy, as well as for his historical approach. While his initial scholarly contributions during his time at Columbia University were quite conventional and focused on international organizations, following from his experience in the ILO, he soon adopted a more radical perspective. During his time at York University, he began to reassert himself in a historical manner, reflective of his previous training at McGill University, which enabled him to take on more ambitious themes. Cox describes his academic interests as no less than understanding "the structures that underlie the world". Cox died on October 9, 2018.

== Bibliography ==
=== Books ===
- Universal Foreigner: The Individual and the World (Singapore: World Scientific Publishing, 2014).
- Production, Power and World Order: Social Forces in the Making of History (New York: Columbia University Press, 1987).
- The Anatomy of Influence: Decision Making in International Organization (London: Yale University Press, 1973), with Harold K. Jacobson.

=== Articles ===
- Gramsci, Hegemony and International Relations: An Essay in Method (1983) Millennium 12, no. 2.
- Social Forces, States and World Orders: Beyond International Relations Theory (1981) Millennium 10, no. 2.

=== Edited works ===
- The Political Economy of a Plural World: Critical Reflections on Power, Morals, and Civilization (London: Routledge, 2002), with Michael G. Schechter.
- Approaches to World Order (Cambridge: Cambridge University Press, 1996), with Timothy J. Sinclair.
