= British International Political Economy =

British International Political Economy is a label attached by some (most notably Ben Cohen) to a particular approach to international political economy (IPE), an approach which increases the breadth of choices about what IPE really involves. Ben Cohen's book International Political Economy: An Intellectual History describes the history of IPE as having led to two separate and incommensurate camps: 'American' IPE and 'British' IPE. Cohen's stated purpose was to create a dialogue between the camps with a view to bridging the intellectual divide. It has been argued that it is Cohen's characterization of the British IPE that has provoked the biggest criticisms.

This approach is interested in what Cohen terms 'the Really Big Question', which is really two questions: where is the world going, and how can "we" influence its direction? The aim of this British IPE is for Cohen more strategic than practical. It deals not with how states might best manage trade policy or monetary policy (given the existing conditions) but rather, with "the stresses and conflicts within the whole complex of societies and states that could lead to a transformation of existing structures in directions that might be either disastrously divisive and conflictual or, alternatively, more equitable and more peaceful".

To address these really big questions, a wide range of factors should be taken into account: indeed anything that might influence people and their political structures. For this British approach, a positivist methodology ("what is") is not so useful; rather, a "diachronic historical perspective" should be taken.

== See also ==
- Review of International Political Economy
