= Susan Strange =

British political theorist (1923–1998)

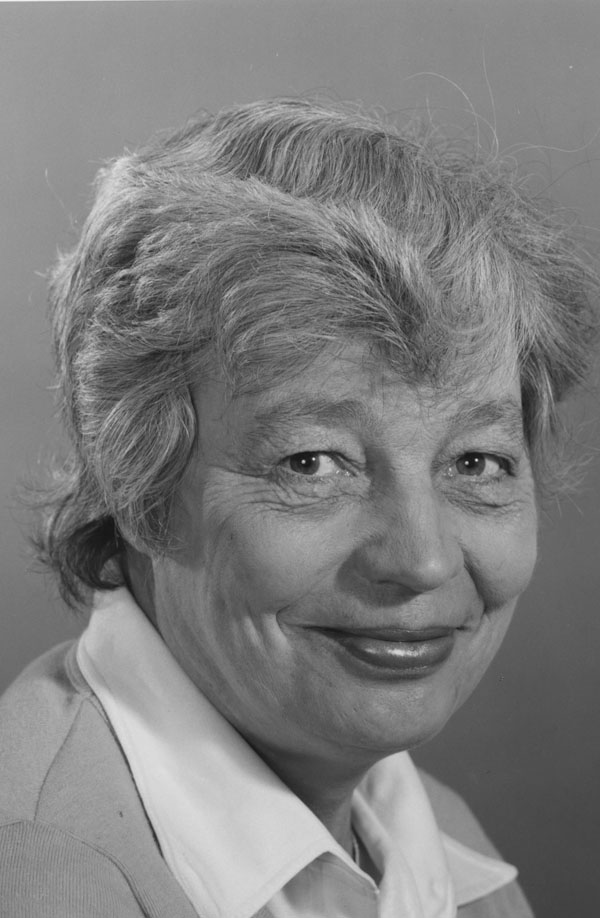
- Portrait of Susan Strange in 1980
- Born: 9 June 1923; Langton Matravers, Dorset, England, UK
- Died: 25 October 1998 (aged 75); Aylesbury, Buckinghamshire, England, UK
- Family: Louis Strange (father)

Education
- Education: London School of Economics

Philosophical work
- School: International political economy
- Institutions: University of Warwick; European University Institute; London School of Economics; Chatham House
- Main interests: International relations, finance, economic history, power, macroeconomics
- Notable ideas: International political economy, structural power, Westfailure, casino capitalism

Susan Strange (9 June 1923 – 25 October 1998) was a British political economist, author, and journalist who was a pioneer of international political economy (IPE). Notable publications include Sterling and British Policy (1971), Casino Capitalism (1986), States and Markets (1988), The Retreat of the State (1996), and Mad Money (1998). She helped create the British International Studies Association (BISA). She was the first woman to hold the Montague Burton Professor of International Relations at the London School of Economics (LSE), the first female academic to have a professorship named after her at the LSE, and was honoured with several annual awards named after her.

== Early life ==
Susan Strange was born on 9 June 1923 in Langton Matravers, in the county of Dorset, the daughter of English aviator Louis Strange. She went to the Royal High School, Bath, and to the University of Caen in France, and graduated with a bachelor's degree in economics from the LSE during the Second World War. Like Robert W. Cox, the other founder of British IPE, she never obtained a PhD.

== Career ==
Strange earned a first in economics at the LSE in 1943. She raised six children and worked as a financial journalist for The Economist and then The Observer until 1957. At The Observer, she became the youngest White House correspondent of her time. She began lecturing on International Politics at the University College London in 1949.

In 1964, Strange became a full-time researcher at Chatham House (formally the Royal Institute of International Affairs). At Chatham House, she authored Sterling and British Policy (1971). She set up an influential research group on IPE at Chatham House in 1971. She played a role in the establishing of the journal Review of International Political Economy, which is the leading journal dedicated to IPE.

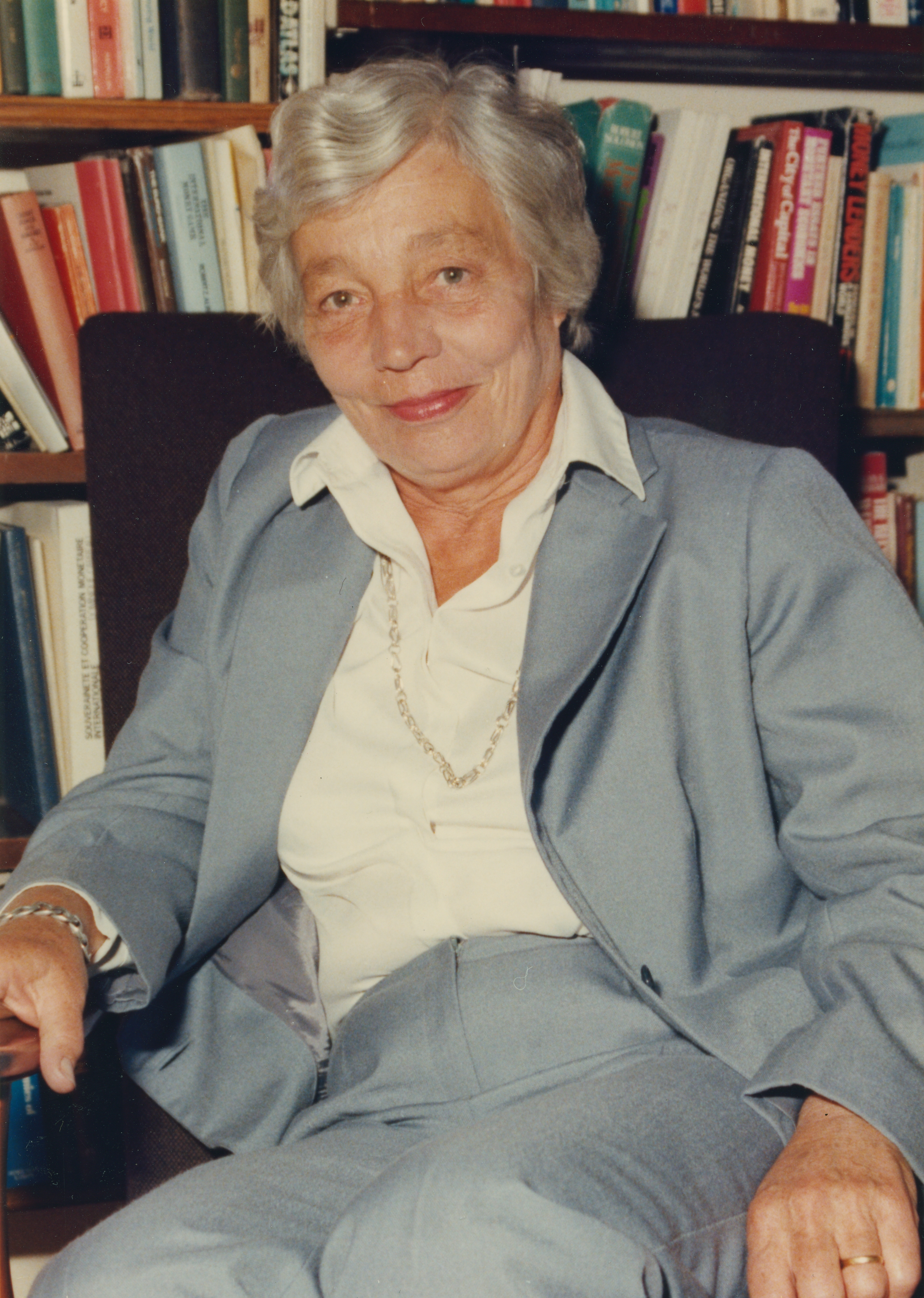
Susan Strange, c.1980s

From 1978 to 1988, Strange served as the Montague Burton Professor of International Relations at LSE, and was the first woman at LSE to hold this chair and professorship. At the LSE, she built Britain's first graduate program in IPE. While at LSE, she held Visiting Professorships at the Brookings Institution, the University of Minnesota, the University of California, Columbia University, and the Bologna Center of Johns Hopkins University’s School of Advanced International Studies.

Strange served as professor of international political economy at the European University Institute in Florence, Italy, from 1989 to 1993. Strange's final academic post, which she held from 1993 until her death in 1998, was as chair of International Relations and professor of IPE at the University of Warwick, where she built up the graduate programme in IPE. She also taught in Japan, where between 1993 and 1996 she was several times guest lecturer at Aoyama Gakuin University in Tokyo.

Strange was a major figure in the professional associations in both Britain and the United States. She was an instrumental founding member and the first treasurer of the BISA, and served as the third female president of the International Studies Association (ISA) in 1995. Her only autobiographical essay, "I Never Meant to Be an Academic", was republished online in 2020 and includes stories from her early life to the 1970s.

== Scholarship on global politics and economics ==
=== International political economy ===
Strange was an influential thinker on global affairs. She played a central role in developing IPE as a field of study, and is a key figure in political economy approaches to security studies. Her 1970 article, "International Economics and International Relations: A Case of Mutual Neglect", laid out her arguments for the need of a discipline of IPE. Strange argued that power was central to international political economy. She observed that in general "economists simply do not understand how the global political economy works" due to a poor understanding of power and an over-reliance on abstract economic models; however, she added that political scientists also have a woeful understanding of how the world works due to their emphasis on institutions and power. Thus she became one of the earliest campaigners advocating the necessity of studying both politics and economics for international relations scholars. She influenced scholars such as Robert Gilpin. She was a critic of regime theory, arguing that the scholarship on regimes was too state-centric and carried a hidden bias in favor of maintaining US hegemony.

In the 1980s, Strange disagreed with claims by other international studies scholars that US hegemony was on the decline. She was skeptical of static indicators of power, arguing that it was structural power that mattered. In particular, interactions between states and markets mattered. She pointed to the superiority of the American technology sector, dominance in services, and the position of the US dollar as the top international currency as real indicators of lasting power. She also disagreed with the attempt of economists led by Milton Friedman to mimic the natural sciences, which she thought was both dangerous and misplaced.

=== Power and international financial markets ===
Strange's key contribution to IPE was on the issue of power, which she considered essential to the character and dynamics of the global economy. She distinguished between relational power (the power to compel A to get B to do something B does not want to do) and structural power (the power to shape and determine the structure of the global political economy). Her works were generally successfully and were republished in subsequent years. States and Markets (Pinter, 1988) delineated four key forms of power—security, production, finance, and knowledge; power was described as the ability to "provide protection, make things, obtain access to credit, and develop and control authoritative modes of interpreting the world". Strange posited that the most overlooked channel of power is financial access, which consequently becomes the most important one to comprehend; in other words, she argued that one cannot comprehend how the world works without a thorough understanding of international financial markets.

To illustrate, Casino Capitalism (B. Blackwell, 1986) discussed the dangers of the international financial system, which she considered confirmed by the 1997 Asian financial crisis. According to Strange, there is a financial "contagion" creating a huge instability in the international financial markets. Her analysis in States and Markets also focused on what she called the "market-authority nexus", the see-saw of power between the market and political authority. She maintained that the global market, relative to the nation state, had gained significant power since the 1970s and that a "dangerous gap" was emerging between the two. She considered nation states inflexible, limited by territorial boundaries in a world of fragile intergovernmental co-operation; "Westfailure" is what she called Westphalia. Markets would be able to flout regulations and reign free, creating more uncertainty and risk in an already chaotic environment.

=== Casino capitalism ===
In Casino Capitalism (B. Blackwell, 1986), also republished by Manchester University Press, Strange problemized the nonsystem that the international monetary system had become. In popularising the concept of casino capitalism, she compared it with a casino whereon the foreign exchange plays as snakes and ladders. She set the stakes that international finance had become stronger than states and deregularised. The Smithsonian Agreement was weakened, leading further to benign neglect from the US, while the Eurodollar market and OPEC strongly undermined the Bretton Woods system. According to Strange, there is no state or actor governing the international monetary system and the international financial markets. American banks are made free to pursue their interests since the 1980s strengthened by the possibility to finance American bonds in the world, making a carousel of bond trading with the OPEC and the Eurodollar market. The forces of market integration set by the Bretton Woods system was going through.

Casino capitalism is the high risk-taking and financial instability associated with financial institutions becoming very large and mostly self-regulated, while also taking on high-risk financial investment dealings. This has been a driving motive by investors in the quest for profits without production; it provides a speculation aspect that offers prospects for a quicker and more speculator returns for people, wealth, and inside assumptions of the factors likely to affect asset price movements. Typically, this does not add to the collective wealth of an economy, as it can instead create economic instability. Popularised by Strange in 1986 through her eponymous book, casino capitalism falls alongside the idea of a speculation-based economy where entrepreneurial activities turn to more paper games of speculative trading than actually producing economic goods and services. It is believed by economists such as Frank Stilwell that casino capitalism was one of the leading causes of the 2008 financial crisis. Investors sought out a get-rich-quick motive they found through speculative activities that offered a particular individual gain or loss depending on the assets' future movements. Other economists like Hans-Werner Sinn have written about casino capitalism with commentary outside the Anglo-Saxon financial bubble.

In Rival States, Rival Firms (1991, Cambridge University Press), Strange discussed the structural change in international production and its related implications for developing countries. Mad Money (University of Manchester Press, 1998) updated the analysis of Casino Capitalism to the late 1990s. At the time of her death, she was working on an exposition of her theory of the international money system. Strange argued in Mad Money that complex derivatives, such as credit default swaps, had increased systemic risk in the global financial system. She has been described as a prescient thinker who foresaw multiple aspects of the 2008 financial crisis and its aftermath. In 2024, the BISA organised an event on Strange's work, which "has enjoyed a renaissance recently".

== Personal life ==
In 1942, Strange married Denis Merritt (died 1993); they had one son and one daughter, and the marriage was dissolved in 1955. That same year, she married Clifford Selly, with whom she had three sons and one daughter. She died on 25 October 1998.

== Legacy ==
Strange is credited for being "almost single-handedly responsible for creating international political economy", and described as "a great international relations theorist", as well as "arguably Britain's most influential scholar of world politics in the last quarter of the twentieth century. Today, she is widely recognized for having put the field of International Political Economy (IPE) on the map in the UK." Of her legacy, Frances Pinter wrote: "Today much of what she warned against has come to pass. Some criticise her for not having predicted everything that's happened since the books were published, but soothsaying has never been a precise art. Suffice to say, she got it right most of the time."

Barry K. Gills said that Strange's death had "robbed IPE of one of its most influential and colourful scholars". Strange was honoured by Robert W. Cox and Roger Tooze in two written analyses of her career and influence. Economist Ronen Palan of City University of London argued that Strange was a "great theorist" who was held back and neglected due to sexism. In summarising her influence, Nat Dyer positively likened her ideas to those of Hyman Minsky, whom he described as "a once obscure economist who shot to fame after the financial crisis", added that she was "one of the principal thinkers who foresaw multiple aspects" of the global 2008 financial crisis and its aftermath that led to the Great Recession, and observed that she "deserves credit for her prescience but has been overlooked".

Strange was honoured as the first female academic to have a professorship named after her at the LSE and remembered through several annual awards. The Susan Strange Award was established in 1998 by the US-based ISA and "recognizes a person whose singular intellect, assertiveness, and insight most challenge conventional wisdom and intellectual and organizational complacency in the international studies community". The Susan Strange Book Prize was established in 2010 by the BISA "for an outstanding book published in any field of International Studies" each year. The Susan Strange Young Scholar Award was given by the Center for Global Studies at the University of Bonn for "female students who have submitted an excellent thesis with a research focus on international relations". In 2024, King's College London and the LSE hosted a two-day conference celebrating and debating the continuing relevance of Strange's thinking both in and outside academia.

== Selected works ==
- Strange, Susan (1971). Sterling and British Policy: A Political Study of an International Currency in Decline. Oxford: Oxford University Press. doi:10.2307/2613930. ISBN 978-0-192-14985-5. JSTOR 2613930 – via Internet Archive.
- Strange, Susan; Prout, Christopher (1976). International Economic Relations of the Western World, 1959–1971: International Monetary Relations. London: Royal Institute of International Affairs. ISBN 978-0-192-18317-0 – via Google Books.
- Strange, Susan (1986). Casino Capitalism. Oxford: B. Blackwell. ISBN 978-0-631-15026-8 – via Google Books.
- Strange, Susan (1988). States and Markets. London: Pinter. ISBN 978-0-86187-942-7 – via Google Books.
- Strange, Susan (1989). "'I Never Meant to Be an Academic'". In Kruzel, Joseph; Rosenau, James N. (eds.). Journeys Through World Politics: Autobiographical Reflections of Thirty-four Academic Travellers. Lanham: Lexington Books. pp. 429–436. OCLC 18561394 (all editions). Archived from the original on 31 January 2021 – via Google Books and University of Oxford.
- Strange, Susan; Stopford, John M.; Henley, John S. (1991). Rival States, Rival Firms: Competition for World Market Shares. Cambridge: Cambridge University Press. ISBN 978-0-521-42386-1 – via Google Books.
- Strange, Susan (1996). The Retreat of the State: The Diffusion of Power in the World Economy. Cambridge: Cambridge University Press. ISBN 978-0-521-56440-3 – via Google Books.
- Strange, Susan (1998). Mad Money: When Markets Outgrow Governments. Manchester: Manchester University Press. ISBN 978-0-719-05237-8 – via Google Books.
- Strange, Susan (December 1998). "CSGR Working Paper No. 18/98 'What Theory? The Theory in Mad Money'" (PDF). Coventry: Centre for the Study of Globalisation and Regionalization, University of Warwick.
- Strange, Susan (1 July 1999). "The Westfailure System". Review of International Studies. 25 (3): 345–354. doi:10.1017/S0260210599003459. ISSN 1469-9044 – via Cambridge University Press & Assessment.

Source
Cohen 2008, pp. 45–51

== Bibliography ==
=== Articles ===
- Carter, Alison (17 October 2017). "Professor Susan Strange 1923 – 1998: A Tribute". LSE Blogs. London School of Economics and Political Science.
- Carter, Alison (14 November 2017). "Professor Susan Strange: A Tribute from Frances Pinter". LSE Blogs. London School of Economics and Political Science.
- "Conference celebrates pioneering work of Susan Strange". King's College London. 13 August 2024.
- Dyer, Nat (27 February 2019). "Susan Strange: a great thinker or a 'journalist'?". Sheffield Political Economy Research Institute. Archived from the original on 15 December 2020.
- Dyer, Nat (2021). "'Susan Strange saw the financial crisis coming, Your Majesty': The Case for the LSE's Great Global Political Economist" (PDF). Earthrise. Archived from the original (PDF) on 9 August 2022.
- "EmPOWER! Politics, Policy, and Personality!". Center for Global Studies at the University of Bonn. 5 November 2021.
- "Featured events". British International Studies Association. 2024. Archived from the original on 7 August 2025.
- Gills, Barry K. (February 1999). "IPEG NEWS: all the news that's fit to read". International Political Economy at the British International Studies Association. Archived from the original on 10 September 2011.
- Halliday, Fred (24 September 2008). "The revenge of ideas: Karl Polanyi and Susan Strange". openDemocracy.
- Higgott, Richard; Tooze, Roger (4 August 2023). "Susan Strange Obituary" (PDF). University of Warwick Centre for the Study of Globalisation and Regionalisation.
- "I Never Meant to Be an Academic by Susan Strange". University of Oxford. 9 November 2020.
- Mabon, Simon (2 December 2022). "Social Theory: Susan Strange". Richardson Institute at Lancaster University.
- Owens, Patricia (19 September 2018). "Susan Strange – world renowned international relations scholar". LSE Blogs. London School of Economics and Political Science.
- Sen, Gautam (9 December 1998). "Obituary: Professor Susan Strange". The Independent. Archived from the original on 11 October 2025.
- "Susan Strange Award". International Studies Association. 2025.
- "Susan Strange Best Book Prize". British International Studies Association. 2025.

=== Books ===
- Bauer, Harry; Brighi, Elisabetta, eds. (2003). International Relations at LSE: A History of 75 Years. London: Millennium Publishing Group. ISBN 978-0-9544397-0-5 – via Google Books.
- Coleman, William; Sajed, Alina (2013). Fifty Key Thinkers on Globalization. London: Routledge. ISBN 978-1-136-16394-4 – via Google Books.
- "Casino capitalism". QFinance – The Ultimate Resource. London: Bloomsbury Information. 2009. ISBN 978-1-8493-0000-1. Archived from the original on 7 November 2017 – via Financepractitioner.com.
- Cohen, Benjamin J. (2008). International Political Economy: An Intellectual History. Princeton: Princeton University Press. ISBN 978-0-691-13569-4 – via Google Books.
- Green, Stephen (2018). Good Value: Reflections on Money, Morality and an Uncertain World. New York: Open Road + Grove/Atlantic. ISBN 978-0-8021-9796-2 – via Google Books.
- Heywood, Andrew (2015). Global Politics (2nd ed.). London: Palgrave Macmillan. ISBN 978-1-137-34926-2. OCLC 979008143.
- Norrlof, Carla (2010). America's Global Advantage: US Hegemony and International Cooperation. Cambridge: Cambridge University Press. doi:10.1017/cbo9780511676406. ISBN 978-0-521-76543-5 – via Cambridge University Press & Assessment.
- Sinn, Hans-Werner (2012). Casino Capitalism: How the Financial Crisis Came About and What Needs to be Done Now. Oxford: Oxford University Press. ISBN 978-0-1996-5988-3 – via Google Books.
- Stilwell, Frank (2011). Political Economy: The Contest of Economic Ideas (3rd ed.). Oxford: Oxford University Press. ISBN 978-0-1955-7501-9 – via Google Books.

=== Peer-reviewed articles ===
- Baker, Ann Pimlott (23 September 2004). "Strange [married names Merritt, Selly], Susan". Oxford Dictionary of National Biography (online ed.). Oxford University Press. doi:10.1093/ref:odnb/71291 – via Oxford Dictionary of National Biography. (Subscription, Wikipedia Library access or UK public library membership required.)
- Brown, Chris (July 1999). "Susan Strange—A Critical Appreciation". Review of International Studies. 25 (3): 531–535. doi:10.1017/s0260210599005318. ISSN 1469-9044. JSTOR 20097617 – via Cambridge University Press & Assessment.
- Cappella Zielinski, Rosella; Schilde, Kaija; Ripsman, Norrin (5 March 2020). "A Political Economy of Global Security Approach". Journal of Global Security Studies. 6 (1). doi:10.1093/jogss/ogaa005. ISSN 2057-3170 – via Oxford Academic.
- Cohen, Benjamin J. (2 May 2007). "The Transatlantic Divide: Why Are American and British IPE So Different?". Review of International Political Economy. 14 (2): 197–219. doi:10.1080/09692290701288277. S2CID 16476865 – via Taylor & Francis Online.
- Conan, A. R. (1 December 1971). "Sterling and British Policy. By S. Strange. (London: Oxford University Press for the Royal Institute of International Affairs, 1971. Pp. xix 363. £4.00". The Economic Journal. 81 (324): 998–1000. doi:10.2307/2230361. JSTOR 2230361 – via Oxford Academic.
- Friman, H. Richard (August 2003). "Caught Up in the Madness? State Power and Transnational Organized Crime in the Work of Susan Strange". Alternatives. Culture & Conflicts. 28 (4): 473–489. doi:10.1177/030437540302800403. JSTOR 40645091. S2CID 141508384 – via Sage Journals.
- Katzenstein, Peter J.; Keohane, Robert O.; Krasner, Stephen D. (Autumn 1998). "International Organization and the Study of World Politics". International Organization. 52 (4): 645–685. doi:10.1017/S002081830003558X. ISSN 0020-8183. S2CID 34947557 – via Cambridge University Press & Assessment.
- Leander, Anna (February 2001). "Dependency Today: Finance, Firms, Mafias and the State: A Review of Susan Strange's Work from a Developing Country Perspective". Third World Quarterly. 22 (1): 115–128. doi:10.1080/713701141. JSTOR 3993349. S2CID 154791701 – via Taylor & Francis Online.
- May, Christopher (1 May 1996). "Strange Fruit: Susan Strange's Theory of Structural Power in the International Political Economy". Global Society: Journal of Interdisciplinary International Relations. doi:10.1080/13600829608443105 – via Taylor & Francis Online.
- Palan, Ronen (Summer 1999). "Susan Strange 1923–1998: A Great International Relations Theorist". Review of International Political Economy. 6 (2): 121–132. doi:10.1080/096922999347254. JSTOR 4177305 – via Taylor & Francis Online.
- Poast, Paul (May 2019). "Beyond the 'Sinew of War': The Political Economy of Security as a Subfield". Annual Review of Political Science. 22 (1): 223–239. doi:10.1146/annurev-polisci-050317-070912. ISSN 1094-2939 – via Annual Reviews.
- "Susan Strange 1923–1998: A Great International Relations Theorist". Review of International Political Economy. 6 (2): 121–132. 1 January 1999. doi:10.1080/096922999347254. ISSN 0969-2290 – via Taylor & Francis Online.
- Winecoff, William Kindred (28 September 2020). "'The Persistent Myth of Lost Hegemony,' Revisited: Structural Power As a Complex Network Phenomenon". European Journal of International Relations. 26: 209–252. doi:10.1177/1354066120952876. ISSN 1354-0661. S2CID 222003135 – via Sage Journals.
