= Currency Power: Understanding Monetary Rivalry =

2015 book by Benjamin J. Cohen

- Cover
- Author: Benjamin J. Cohen
- Language: English
- Subject: International political economy
- Genre: Nonfiction
- Publisher: Princeton University Press
- Publication date: 2015
- Publication place: United States
- Media type: Print (hardcover and paperback), e-book
- Pages: 304
- ISBN: 978-0-691-16785-5
- Followed by: Currency Statecraft: Monetary Rivalry and Geopolitical Ambition (2019)

Currency Power: Understanding Monetary Rivalry is a 2015 book by the American international political economist Benjamin J. Cohen.

Cohen examines the politics of international money, arguing that a currency's cross-border use and the power of its issuing state shape each other, and applies this argument to the rivalry among the U.S. dollar, the euro, and the Chinese yuan. He contends that the dollar remains the dominant world currency, that the euro's prospects are limited by flaws in its governance, and that the yuan is far from displacing the dollar.

Cohen returned to the subject in a companion volume, Currency Statecraft: Monetary Rivalry and Geopolitical Ambition (2019), which turns from the sources of currency power to what states choose to do with it.

== Summary ==
Cohen asks how an international currency relates to the power of the state that issues it. He takes as his starting point the economist Robert Mundell's aphorism that "great powers have great currencies" and argues that the connection runs in both directions: currency internationalization and state power are, in his phrase, "mutually endogenous". Against a body of scholarship that, in his view, has long assumed rather than examined this link, he separates the conventional notion of "international money" into six distinct functions: the three textbook uses of money (medium of exchange, unit of account, store of value) operating at two levels, the private market and official policy. Each function, he contends, has a different bearing on a state's capabilities.

Two opening chapters set up the argument, one on the dynamics of currency internationalization and the hierarchy Cohen pictures as the Currency Pyramid, the other on the contested concept of power in international relations, which he organizes around questions of meaning, sources, uses, and limits. The theoretical core grounds monetary power in autonomy, a state's capacity to avoid the burden of adjusting to balance-of-payments imbalances. Cohen distinguishes two "hands" of that power: a "power to delay" adjustment, resting on international liquidity and borrowing capacity, and a "power to deflect" its transitional costs onto others, resting on an economy's openness and adaptability. He then traces causation in both directions. Of a currency's six functions, he argues, only the two store-of-value functions (investment and reserve) add directly to power, with the trade function mattering indirectly by shaping central-bank preferences. He also stresses that internationalization is a "double-edged sword", its early advantages liable to erode as foreign liabilities accumulate and a "power curse" sets in, yielding a characteristic life cycle of "virtuous" and then "vicious" circles. Running the arrow the other way, he identifies four elements of state power that drive a currency's rise (economic size, financial development, foreign-policy ties, and military reach) and asks whether an international currency can be deliberately "manufactured" through "managed internationalization".

Based on data for the dollar, euro, yen, pound, and Swiss franc, and borrowing the Herfindahl–Hirschman Index and concentration ratios from the study of industrial organization, Cohen finds the competitive structure of the currency system essentially unchanged over roughly a quarter of a century and treats the widely forecast shift toward multipolarity as not yet evident in the figures. He explains the dollar's persistence ("the dollar is the indispensable currency") by the depth and safety of U.S. financial markets, together with broad trade networks, extensive alliances, and military reach, while questioning the popular view that the greenback survives only as a "negotiated currency"—that is, only because Washington offers political and security inducements to keep others holding it. He attributes the euro's "power unrealized" to a structural defect in the monetary union's governance, an incomplete merger of sovereign states that he likens to a wobbly two-legged stool. He contrasts it with the United States, where federal taxes and spending automatically move money from prosperous regions to struggling ones, and where an early step—Alexander Hamilton's 1790 assumption of the states' debts—forged a genuine fiscal union that the eurozone has never matched. He argues that China's yuan, despite a deliberate two-track internationalization strategy, confronts a "fungibility problem": because the country's capital controls keep the currency from moving and converting freely across borders, economic size alone cannot supply the financial development, open capital markets, and political trust that a top currency requires.

== Critics ==
Paola Subacchi recognized Cohen as a prolific authority on the political economy of international money and credited the work with building its argument on a rigorous analytical framework. She nonetheless judged the heavy reliance on Cohen's own earlier scholarship both a strength and a weakness, finding the treatment of China's currency policy "rather shallow" and the sources selective. Singling out the claim that Beijing had tried to promote internationalization "on the cheap", she called it "not only too broad, but it is also incorrect", citing the exchange-rate flexibility and interest-rate liberalization China had introduced since 2010. She also criticized the book for ignoring the spillover effects of quantitative easing and questioned its account of the exchange-rate anchor as a cost of currency power. She closed by describing it as "an enjoyable and learned book, but also a disappointing one".

Thomas Oatley noted that Cohen had been studying currency power for fifty years and called the resulting book "erudite, lucid, comprehensive and a must-read". He reconstructed its central claims about autonomy, market-driven internationalization, and the asymmetric transactional relationships that convert dependence into influence. Oatley located the book's greatest strength and its principal weakness in a single source: analytic complexity. He applauded the refusal to "pare messy reality down to its bare essentials" while observing that the abundance of variables relative to observations left readers "no less uncertain" than the simpler models being criticized. Asking what the payoff from that complexity might be, he answered that "the additional complexity itself is the payoff", since it foregrounds relational structures, network centrality, and incumbency advantages that reductionist accounts omit. He concluded that the book was "not only the first comprehensive treatment of currency power, it is likely to remain the best such treatment for years to come".
