= Hegemonic stability theory =

Theory of international relations

Hegemonic stability theory (HST) is a theory of international relations, rooted in research from the fields of political science, economics, and history. HST indicates that the international system is more likely to remain stable when a single state is the dominant world power, or hegemon. Thus, the end of hegemony diminishes the stability of the international system. As evidence for the stability of hegemony, proponents of HST frequently point to the Pax Britannica and Pax Americana, as well as the instability prior to World War I (when British hegemony was in decline) and the instability of the interwar period (when the American hegemon reduced its presence from world politics).

The key mechanisms in hegemonic stability theory revolve around public goods provision: to resolve collective action problems regarding public goods, a powerful actor who is willing and able to shoulder a disproportionate share of public goods provision is needed. Hegemonic stability may entail self-reinforcing cooperation, as it is in the interest of the hegemon to provide public goods and it is in interest of other states to maintain an international order from which they derive public goods.

== Early development ==
Charles Kindleberger is one of the scholars most closely associated with HST; commentators such as Benjamin Cohen regard him as the theory's founder and most influential proponent. In his 1973 book The World in Depression: 1929—1939, Kindleberger argued that the economic chaos between World War I and World War II that led to the Great Depression was partly attributable to the lack of a world leader with a dominant economy. Kindleberger's reasoning touched upon more than economics, however: the central idea behind HST suggests that the stability of the global system, in terms of politics, international law, and so on, relies on the hegemon to develop and enforce the rules of that system. Other key figures in the development of hegemonic stability theory include Robert Gilpin and Stephen Krasner.

In his major work, Gilpin theorizes world history as imperial cycles until late modern times and the succession of hegemonies in late modern times when first Britain and later the United States stabilized the international system. Gilpin opposes balancing and the balance-of-power theory. He contends that the system naturally goes toward equilibrium. From global war or "hegemonic war" emerges a new hegemon who creates and keeps the new world order with its own set of preferences. This is partly accomplished by providing public goods. In the case of the hegemony of the United States after 1945, there took place attempts at initialising a stable currency by means of the International Monetary Fund, the Bretton Woods system, establishment of the World Bank, security alliances (such as NATO), and democratisation.

Gilpin argues further that in the global system, the more decisive a victory is after the "hegemonic war", the more stable the new system will be. He agrees with Paul Kennedy's view of "imperialistic overstretch" as one of the reasons that hegemons fall. Gilpin adds that all hegemons inevitably fall because at a certain stage expansion exceeds benefits, distribution of power in the system shifts and other states rise and challenge the hegemon. Eventually, a dissatisfied great power that approaches the power of the current hegemon will cause a new global war and the cycle repeats.

Robert Keohane coined the term "Hegemonic stability theory" in a 1980 article. Keohane's 1984 book After Hegemony used insights from the new institutional economics to argue that the international system could remain stable in the absence of a hegemon, thus questioning hegemonic stability theory. John Ruggie's work on embedded liberalism also challenged hegemonic stability theory. He argued that the post-World War II international order was not just held together by material power but through "legitimate social purpose" whereby governments created support for the international order through social policies that alleviated the adverse effects of globalization. John Ikenberry argues that hegemony is not a precondition for international stability, pointing to path dependence and "stickiness" of institutions.

== Hegemonic attributes ==
To rise to hegemonic status, a state must make commitments spanning multiple domains. In the view of the American grand strategist Christopher Layne, hegemonic states have five defining attributes:

1. Superior military force is necessary for the ability to forge new international laws and organizations.
2. Insularity provides added security and the potential to project military forces, though in some cases hegemons have not been insular or peninsular. The United States of America, for instance, has become a virtual island. It has two massive seaboards, and its neighbors are long-standing allies, setting it apart from the rest of great powers. Nuclear weapons and superior air force add to its national security.
3. A large and growing economy. Usually, unrivaled supremacy in at least one leading economic or technological sector is necessary. Military and economic powers compose the capability to enforce the rules of the system.
4. The will to lead and to establish a hegemonic regime by enforcing the rules of the system. After World War I, the United States possessed the capacity to lead, but lacked the will to do so. Without the will to force stability on the international system, the United States missed an opportunity to prevent the onset of the Great Depression or World War II.
5. A hegemon must commit to the system, which needs to be perceived as mutually beneficial by other great powers and important state-actors.

== Competing theories of hegemonic stability ==
Research on hegemony can be divided into two schools of thought: the realist school and the systemic school. Each school can be further sub-divided. Two dominant theories have emerged from each school. What Robert Keohane first called the "theory of hegemonic stability", joins A. F. K. Organski's Power Transition Theory as the two dominant approaches to the realist school of thought. Long Cycle Theory, espoused by George Modelski, and World Systems Theory, espoused by Immanuel Wallerstein, have emerged as the two dominant approaches to the systemic school of thought.

=== Systemic school of thought ===
According to Thomas J. McCormick, scholars and other experts on the systemic school define hegemony "as a single power's possession of 'simultaneous superior economic efficiency in production, trade and finance.'" Furthermore, a hegemon's superior position is considered the logical consequence of superior geography, technological innovation, ideology, superior resources, and other factors.

==== Long cycle theory ====
George Modelski, who presented his ideas in the book, Long Cycles in World Politics (1987), is the chief architect of long cycle theory. In a nutshell, long cycle theory describes the connection between war cycles, economic supremacy, and the political aspects of world leadership.

Long cycles, or long waves, offer interesting perspectives on global politics by permitting "the careful exploration of the ways in which world wars have recurred, and lead states such as Britain and the United States have succeeded each other in an orderly manner." Not to be confused with Simon Kuznets' idea of long-cycles, or long-swings, long cycles of global politics are patterns of past world politics.

The long cycle, according to Dr. Dan Cox, is a period of time lasting approximately 70 to 100 years. At the end of that period, "the title of most powerful nation in the world switches hands." Modelski divides the long cycle into four phases. When periods of global war, which could last as much as one-fourth of the total long cycle, are factored in, the cycle can last from 87 to 122 years.

Many traditional theories of international relations, including the other approaches to hegemony, believe that the baseline nature of the international system is anarchy. Modelski's long cycle theory, however, states that war and other destabilizing events are a natural product of the long cycle and larger global system cycle. They are part of the living processes of the global polity and social order. Wars are "systemic decisions" that "punctuate the movement of the system at regular intervals." Because "world politics is not a random process of hit or miss, win or lose, depending on the luck of the draw or the brute strength of the contestants," anarchy simply doesn't play a role. After all, long cycles have provided, for the last five centuries, a means for the successive selection and operation of numerous world leaders.

Modelski used to believe that long cycles were a product of the modern period. He suggests that the five long cycles, which have taken place since about 1500, are each a part of a larger global system cycle, or the modern world system.

Under the terms of long cycle theory, five hegemonic long cycles have taken place, each strongly correlating to economic Kondratieff Waves (or K-Waves). The first hegemon would have been Portugal during the 16th century, then the Netherlands during the 17th century. Next, Great Britain served twice, first during the 18th century, then during the 19th century. The United States has been serving as hegemon since the end of World War II.

The traditional view of long cycle theory has evolved somewhat, as Modelski now suggests that Northern and Southern Sung China, Venice and Genoa were each the dominant economic powers during medieval long cycles. However, he does not classify any of these states as world powers. Only when Portugal gained hegemony after 1500 is that distinction made.

=== Other views of hegemonic stability ===
==== Neorealist interpretation ====
In his book The Tragedy of Great Power Politics John J. Mearsheimer, a Neorealist and offensive realist, outlines how the anarchic system that neorealists subscribe to (see Kenneth Waltz for original theory) creates power hungry states who will each attempt to install themselves as regional and global hegemons. The system is created, shaped and maintained by coercion. The hegemon would begin to undermine the institution when it is not in their interests. With the decline of a hegemon, the system descends into instability.

==== Classical liberal interpretation ====
It is motivated by enlightened self-interest; the hegemon takes on the costs because it is good for all actors, thereby creating stability in the system, which is also in the interests of all actors.

==== Neoliberal interpretation ====
Neoliberals argue that the hegemon wishes to maintain its dominant position without paying enforcement costs, so it creates a system in which it can credibly limit the returns to power (loser doesn't lose all) and credibly commit to neither dominate nor abandon them. This is done through institutions, which are sticky, (hard to change, more convenient to continue using than to revamp). These institutions favor the hegemon but provide protection and a stable world order for the rest of the world. The more open this world-order, the less likely that there will be a challenger. With the decline of the hegemon, institutions don't automatically die, because they were constructed in a way that benefited all stakeholders; instead, they take on a life of their own (see regime theory).

=== Criticism ===
Keohane's 1984 book After Hegemony used insights from the new institutional economics to argue that the international system could remain stable in the absence of a hegemon, thus rebutting hegemonic stability theory. Keohane showed that international cooperation could be sustained through repeated interactions, transparency, and monitoring. These factors could reduce transaction costs and provide information about other states (for example, whether the states are cheating or contributing). Duncan Snidal argues that international cooperation is sustainable even after hegemony because smaller states derive sufficient benefits to be willing to contribute towards international institutions.

Using insights from historical institutionalism, John Ikenberry argues that the international institutions set up by the United States are sustainable due to feedback effects, whereby it is costly for actors to set up alternative institutions. Ikenberry also argues that hegemonic stability theory fails to account for regime types, which is essential to understanding why democratic hegemons such as the United States created institutions during periods in which they were hegemons, whereas non-democratic hegemons in previous eras did not set up institutional orders when given the opportunity. Consistent with hegemonic stability theory, Ikenberry argues that the ability to create institutions is partly due to power preponderance.

Dominic Tierney argues that hegemonic stability theorists are wrong in assuming that unipolarity leads to a stable order. He argues that it is the contestation that compels the great power and other states to build international order.

Maria Gavris has criticized HST for its underdeveloped conceptualization of hegemony.

== Post-Cold War period ==
=== Theory ===
On the "unipolar moment" in 1990, the leading expert on the world-systems theory, Christopher Chase-Dunn, linked the forthcoming period with the HST. He reminded that hegemonic rivalry led to World Wars and in future such a rivalry among core states is only likely if the US hegemony continues to decline. But the current situation of single superpower is eminently stable.

To the mainstream International Relations (IR below), the unipolar world came as a surprise. Realists, shaped by “two World Wars and the Cold War, understood the differing logics of multipolar and bipolar systems, but apparently failed to envision a unipolar world because none of their works before the end of the Cold War accounts for it.” Following the "unipolar moment", some scholars argued it would lead to the instability and imminent collapse of the hegemonic order, whereas other scholars argue it would lead to hegemonic stability.

In 1999, William Wohlforth argued for hegemonic stability theory in the unipolar moment, titled his article on it, "The stability of a unipolar world", paraphrasing the 1964 title, "The stability of a bipolar world", by the founder of Neorealism, Kenneth Waltz. Wohlforth wrote, "[The] hegemonic theory has received little shrill in the debate over the nature of the post-Cold War international system. This omission is unwarranted, for the theory has simple and profound implications for the peacefulness of the post-Cold War international order that are backed up by a formidable body of scholarship." The first obstacle facing the IR research after the Cold War was mathematical — how many poles gives two minus one:

The multipolar idea, based on the end of the cold war and the Soviet Union's retreat from its empire, never did make sense, arithmetically. Somehow two take-away one didn't equal one in the high math of international politics. Instead, it equaled at least three — the U.S., Japan and Europe. Or maybe even five, with the Soviet Union and China.

The article by Wohlforth, according to Stephen Walt, broke the theoretical path.

In the following decade, the IR research tentatively switched to the unipolar or hegemonic stability, which replaced the balance of power as the focus of intense debate among IR scholars. Charles Kupchan, who since 1991 expects an imminent end to the US hegemony, in 2003 agreed that this hegemony causes the present peace and stability.

Until the early 2000s, Jack S. Levy and William Thompson adhered to the main Realist paradigm that hegemonic stability is theoretically impossible because other states would counter-balance. By the end of the decade, however, both engaged in search for the causes of the present hegemonic stability. In 2009, the student and follower of Waltz, Christopher Layne, confessed: "As events transpires, however, the fate of earlier hegemons has not befallen the United States." In the 2010s, more IR scholars accepted the hegemonic stability as a theory most fitting the post-Cold War period.

Curiously, one of the classics of the HST, Gilpin, denied the existence of the post-Cold-War hegemony and never applied the theory to this period. In 2002, Gilpin referred to some scholars who define the present system as hegemonic. "Less sanguin observers," however, countered that the bipolar system was supplanted by "chaotic, multipolar world of five or more major powers." The proclamation of the "new world order" he attributed to the end of the Gulf War in 1991, though the proclamation is attested from 1990 and the Gulf War had been regarded as the first test to the already existing new world order.

=== Application ===
==== United States ====
Although the Hegemonic stability theory is attributed to the 1973 work by Kindleberger and the Realist mainstream rejected it for three decades longer, several scholars since World War II had theorized about the US preponderance of power which is identical in its arguments to the hegemonic stability. Similar arguments ping-ponged in the literature about the American foreign policy until the 2017 Peace through strength promised by Donald Trump.

Three scholars described how the US-led hegemonic system produces stability in the 21st century: The United States makes its power safe for the world and in return the world agrees to live within the hegemonic system maintaining formal or informal alliances and open markets. The United States has been influential in moving many countries towards embracing the free market through institutions such as the International Monetary Fund and World Bank (see Washington Consensus).

Curiously, at the peak of the 2003 anti-hegemonic crisis, the world public opinion remained highly pro-hegemonic and convinced in the hegemonic stability. Large majorities of people in most surveyed countries thought that the world would be a more dangerous place if there were a rival to the American superpower. 64% of the French, 70% of the Mexicans and 63% of the Jordanians thought this way.

The US network of alliances created in the early Cold War remains intact in the post-Cold War period and NATO almost doubled in members. When NATO counted only 16 members, it was already described as the most successful alliance in history. As of 2026, it counts 32 members. The exact number of US allies worldwide is undefined because there is no clear criteria for counting unofficial defense partnerships. Bradley A. Thayer counts 84; Max Ostrovsky over 100. 130 countries or even more host US bases. Most of these countries are either formal allies or informal defense partners.

Fifteen years in the post-Cold War period, Thayer calculated the hegemonic stabilization: Of 192 countries, 84 are allied with America and they include almost all of the developed economies. That is a combined GDP ratio of almost 17 to 1, a big change from the Cold War when the same ratio was about 1.8 to 1. Never before in history had any country so many allies. Ostrovsky outlined a political-economic rule which, he claims, has very few exceptions: countries with the nominal per capita GDP above the world average formally or informally ally with the United States.

These are not alliances in the Westphalian sense characterized by impermanence and power-balancing; rather it is a hegemonic system of the Roman kind. Most states of the world host the hegemonic bases, many of them partly cover expenses for running them ("host nation support"), integrate their strategic forces under the hegemonic command, contribute 1—2% of their GDP to the integrated forces, and tip military, economic and humanitarian contributions in case of the hegemonic campaigns worldwide. Actually, these states, some of them recent great powers, surrender their strategic sovereignty en masse in favor of the hegemonic stability.

==== External balancing ====
While the hegemonic bloc concentration is overwhelming, anti-hegemonic military alliances do not form. No power entangles itself in military alliance against the United States. "No counter-hegemonic coalition has taken shape, and none is on the horizon." The only visible pattern to the relations between Moscow and Beijing since the late 1950s is that there is no pattern. There is no evidence that they want to transform their strategic partnership into a military alliance and much evidence to suggest that they do not.

==== China ====
The United States is still considered by most analysts to be at the top of the world, both economically and in terms of military strength. With these abundant resources and power, the world remains "a single superpower world". However, many analysts envisage the emergence of new giants which threaten the U.S. hegemony. These giants, they argue, create new power centers all over the world and the world becomes ever more multipolar. Of those new giants, the single greatest competitor of United States is China as it is growing rapidly with "no equal in modern history". Historically, examples of hegemonic decline come in two prime sectors: the leading state's military and its economy. Both arenas are crucial for the analysis of the shifting power structure.

With the highest gross domestic product at purchasing power parity, China poses a significant challenge to U.S. economic primacy especially with the expectation that U.S. national debt could explode to 717% of GDP by 2080 according to Congressional Budget office. Moreover, this debt is financed largely by China through the purchase of U.S. Treasury bonds. On the other hand, China's economic power, not limited to but including industrialization and modernization, is rapidly burgeoning with high consumption and increasing foreign investment. As Global Trends 2025 points out, the rise of China and India to great power status will restore each to "the positions they held two centuries ago when China produced approximately 30 percent and India 15 percent of the world's wealth."

By 2018, Michael Beckley counted hundreds of books and thousands of articles envisioning the decline of the US, the rise of China and the multipolar world, and outlined an element common to these works—they all relied on gross indicators of power, such as GDP or military spending. These are the same indicators that made China look like a superpower during its century of humiliation (1839—1911). They reflect large population but do not consider welfare costs—the expenses a nation pays to provide this population with food, health care, social security, police, administration and education. Deducting these costs from gross indicators would give net indicators. Beckley suggests considering GDP per capita, more precisely multiplying it by total GDP. According to this net indicator, China still lags far behind the US.

Writing in 1992, Andrew L. Shapiro assured regarding the U.S.: With troops operating abroad in more than fifty-five countries, "a military force is extended so much that it nears a breaking point." After three decades of "nearing a breaking point," the U.S. administration approved a record–breaking peacetime national defense budget of $813 billion. Meanwhile, Shapiro continued in 1992, China is taking advantage by industrializing its army using their wealth. China's military budget is increasing, and the troops are expanding. A decade later, Steven W. Mosher insisted that China is building up its armed forces "to break America's back in Asia and thus end America's reign as the sole superpower in the world."

Some argue that China's rise is dependent on a successful United States due to economic interdependence, as the Chinese economy is export-heavy. Besides the economic interdependence, China might face additional barriers to its hegemonic aspirations, such as domestic political instability, environmental degradation, public health issues, and demographic trends.

==== Russia ====
More revisionist appeared Russia under Vladimir Putin. Repeatedly he addressed the international community with anti-hegemonic agenda, arguing that the post-Cold War hegemony is unstable: "After the dissolution of bipolarity on the planet, we no longer have stability." Key international institutions are ignored by the United States and its western allies. They use force against sovereign states. Instead of settling conflicts they contribute to their escalation, instead of democracy and freedom they support a dubious public ranging from neo-fascists to Islamic radicals, and instead of stable states they produce chaos, outbreaks in violence and a series of upheavals. A "unilateral diktat" leads to instability.

The Russian foreign policy under Putin steadily became more aggressive, culminating with the 2022 Russian invasion of Ukraine. The United States responded with sanctions and military aid to Ukraine. This U.S. response was criticized by some officials and experts as appeasement. Timo S. Koster who served at NATO as Director of Defence Policy & Capabilities criticized: A massacre is taking place in Europe and the strongest military alliance in the world is staying out of it. Philip Breedlove, a retired four-star U.S. Air Force general and a former SACEUR, said that the West have "ceded the initiative to the enemy." No attempt was made by NATO to deter Moscow with the threat of military force, as expressed by another expert. Nevertheless, the U.S. response, combined with similar measures by the NATO allies and the Ukrainian resistance, was enough to roll back the Russian troops on most fronts and, as of 2023, reduce the Russian conquests to the regions with pro-Russian majority.

== Test against historical evidence ==
=== Complications ===
The first complication for testing the HST against history is the absence of a case to test. The world hegemony is unprecedented. William Wohlforth emphasized that we are living in the world's first hegemonic system. Even the leading Realist opponent of the HST agreed on the matter: A dominant power without rivals rising to challenge is a position without precedent. Hence, Walt concluded in 2009, there is not yet consensus on the overall impact of hegemony. The phenomenon is recent and has yet to receive a sustained theoretical attention.

Moreover, the historical IR research remains Eurocentric and Europe has not experienced pan-European hegemony since the fall of Rome. The world during the Pax Britannica was multipolar rather than hegemonic and the period is characterized by hegemonic rivalry rather than stability. Earlier modern European powers named hegemonic in some works, such as the Netherlands, Spain and Portugal, were even less hegemonic than Britain. Gilpin noted that Portugal and the Netherlands only dominated trade. David Wilkinson was perplexed. Russia, the Ottoman Empire, Persia, and India definitely never felt the Dutch hegemony. When the English felt the Dutch hegemony, they defeated it and renamed New Amsterdam. Modern Europe before 1990 had never been hegemonic system, which by definition has only one unrivaled power.

A product of eurocentric research, the Hegemonic Stability Theory was as much theory about instability. In a cyclical pattern, the hegemonic stability would be followed by violent hegemonic power transition to rising competitors (Gilpin, Modelski, Organsky). Periods of expansion are followed by equilibrium which is “merely a temporary phenomenon in the continuing process of international political change.” Organsky, having combined the Hegemonic Stability Theory with the Power transition theory, created a perfect oxymoron. Bound to the modern Europe, the IR research found dubious hegemons, drew from these cases the paradigm of imminent hegemonic fall and implied it to the United States:

One of the ironclad lesson of history is that great powers that seek hegemony are always opposed—and defeated—by the counterbalancing efforts of other states. Yet the prevailing belief among the American foreign policy community is that the United States is exempt from the fate of hegemons.

=== Beyond modern Europe ===
With the American hegemony counting its first decade (since 1990) and showing no signs of collapse in sight, several IR scholars supposed that to find something similar even on regional scale it is necessary to descend to pre-modern times and extend the scope beyond Europe. In 2007, two books devoted to pre-modern civilizations came to light. One was edited by Wohlforth with contributions from experts on several pre-modern civilizations. One of the contributors was Victoria Tin-bor Hui, whose civilization (China) experienced centuries-long unipolar stability. The other book was by Max Ostrovsky, who completed two degrees in world history and PhD in International Relations. This book became the first attempt of theory by a professional historian and at the same time the first IR research extensively based on primary sources.

Both works found that most civilizations most of time were unipolar and the European long balance of power was exceptional in world history. Victoria Tin-bor Hui and Ostrovsky explained it by the expanding nature of the European system, while hegemonic stability needs a geopolitically closed system. The next complication, however, was the kind of unipolarity. Most of unipolar civilizations were universal empires rather than system-wide hegemonies. The former are distinct by formal rule, territorial conquest and annexation, and regular taxation. The team of Wohlforth disregarded this complication. Ostrovsky found in world history three system-wide hegemonies—Sumer, Qin in 364—221 BC and Rome in 189—63 BC. Walter Scheidel also argued that in the cases of Rome and Qin, hegemony preceded direct rule.

=== Three known cases ===
The first striking element is that system-wide hegemonies were rare occasions in world history. The second striking element is that all three known hegemonies were anything but stable. Ostrovsky tested the HST on the three known cases: The hegemon of Sumer, House of Kish, sent envoys to Gilgamesh. Gilgamesh addressed the assembly of warriors: "Let us not submit to the House of Kish, let us smite it with weapons!" The assembly wholeheartedly agreed. "At the word of the fighting men of his city his heart rejoiced, his spirit brightened." A battle was fought and the hegemon was defeated and imprisoned. Hegemony is as old as history. According to the Sumerian King List, Kish established the hegemony yet before the Flood. The anti-hegemonic resistance dates to the same dawn of history too, recorded in one of the earliest literary legacies of mankind.

The hegemonic Qin did not produce anymore stability. The Warring States went more warring. Qin emerged victorious and hegemonic after a war in 364 BC. Shortly, almost all the rest of the Chinese world united into an anti-hegemonic alliance, called Vertical or Perpendicular, and at least once the whole Chinese world "united their wills and joined their forces to attack Qin." "With a force of 1,000,000 soldiers drown from area ten times large than Qin, they beat upon the Pass [to the land of Qin] and pressed forward toward Qin." The same dreadful scenario repeated itself several times. Massive anti-hegemonic alliances characterized the period. As in Sumer, in the Warring-States China hegemony was bound with anti-hegemony. The Qin armies repeatedly crashed the anti-hegemonic alliances in at least 15 major campaigns. Eventually, Qin launched a universal conquest and established universal empire.

The contemporary to Qin Roman hegemony was more stable with longer periods of peace, but almost each generation the system experienced major wars. The last war against Macedonia (148 BC) and the last Punic War (146 BC) were wars of annexation. Three Mithridatic Wars (88—63 BC) were anti-hegemonic wars led by Pontus and similarly ended by annexation of Pontus and the Near East. In the course of these and other wars, Rome, like Qin, evolved from hegemony into universal empire.

"Balance of power, repeatedly remarked two proponents of hegemonic stability, predicts that states will try to prevent the rise of a hegemon; it tells us nothing about what will happen once a country establishes such a position," nor history yields such an implication. History, however, yields. Rome and Qin were well established hegemons but were repeatedly counter-balanced by rival powers or coalitions until they conquered and annexed them.

=== Hegemonic stage ===
Historic cases of system-wide hegemonies accord Balance of Power theory rather than the HST—anti-hegemonic balancing happened and on large scales, as Balance of Power predicts. The only difference is that counter-balancing did not lead to the restoration of balance in the system but in the opposite direction—the hegemonies prevailed and established universal empires. Hence, Ostrovsky concluded that the three cases — of Qin, Rome and the US — are analogous systemic transformations from warring states to hegemony to universal empire with the modern process being presently uncompleted.

Remarkably, all three great powers, Rome, Qin and the US were on the edge of the contemporary civilization and geographically protected, Rome by sea, Qin by mountain ranges and the US by oceans. All three began by the policy of isolation using their natural barriers. Rome initially maintained the doctrine of "no foreign foot in Italy" and later of "no foreign foot in Europe;" Qin began with analogous policy of no foreign foot within the passes. And the US began with the policy of isolation and no foreign foot in the Americas. All three abandoned isolationism in favor of hegemony. Rome and Qin were the only cases in world history when great powers first established a system-wide hegemony and later universal empire. All other known universal empires were established directly out of the system of warring states and avoiding the hegemonic stage. Probably geographic isolation favors this particular hegemonic stage.

Earlier, Pentagon strategist, Edward Luttwak, turned into Roman historian and produced a famous research on the Roman hegemony. Implicitly advocating hegemony for the United States, Luttwak argued that transforming hegemony into empire was Rome's fatal mistake. By contrast to empire, hegemony saves much power. More explicitly, the same was advised by Paul W. Schroeder: "If America goes down the path of empire, it will ultimately fail... Not the least harm will come from ... wrecking an American hegemony." Pessimistic about the United States avoiding the course of empire, he hoped that international politics would "compel it to settle for hegemony."

Basing on the comparative analysis between Rome and Qin instead of the single case of Rome, Ostrovsky countered that the transformation of hegemony into empire is not always fatal mistake — China still exists. And in both cases the transformation resulted in a more stable order and "Golden Age." Replying on Luttwak's thesis of the "economy of force" by a hegemonic power, Ostrovsky suggested that it "naturally results in the economy of obedience by a ruled periphery." Similarly, Roman Historian David Mattingly counter-argued that the “economy of force” was often revealed to be a false economy in the longer term. Permanent force deployment may have been avoided, but often at the cost of larger-scale crisis management later.

A year after Ostrovsky published his anti-thesis, Russia invaded Georgia and began ever more anti-hegemonic policy, culminating with a full scale invasion of Ukraine. According to Robert Kagan, the American "passivity" to the Russian invasion of Georgia in 2008 and the conquest of Crimea in 2014 led to the Russian invasion of Ukraine. Previous hegemons, who have been accustomed to ruling the world since the colonial time, stated Vladimir Putin in 2024, "are increasingly astonished to find out that they are no longer obeyed." Wrongly they thought that "the world would be more obedient."

=== Permanent hegemony ===
The anti-hegemonic initiative of Vladimir Putin, however, fell short. No major power joined him in the endeavor, international opposition was unanimous and his troops were forced to retreat on most fronts, holding only regions with pro-Russian majority as of 2025. Yet four years before Russia suffered the setback in Ukraine, Ostrovsky completed an advanced analysis of the present hegemonic stability. The latter analysis indicated that, despite the best efforts by Putin, the anti-hegemonic resistance in our world is incomparably weaker than in the ancient Roman and Chinese worlds, and the overall trend in our world is toward hegemonic stabilization. "At this point, he concludes, world history runs out of samples." World history knows stability of universal empires; it does not know hegemonic stability and hegemonic systems themselves were exceptional. But the real puzzle history poses to the HST is not why the American hegemony did not fall but rather why it did not evolve into empire and, for the first time in world history, produced hegemonic stability.

== See also ==
- Power transition theory
- Realism (international relations)
