= New Political Economy (journal) =

- Discipline: Political science
- Language: English
- Edited by: Colin Hay

Publication details
- History: 1996–present
- Publisher: Routledge
- Frequency: Bimonthly
- Impact factor: 4.681 (2020)

Standard abbreviations
- ISO 4: New Political Econ.

Indexing
- ISSN: 1356-3467 (print); 1469-9923 (web)
- LCCN: 2018204131
- OCLC no.: 45007305

Links
- Journal homepage; Online access; Online archive

New Political Economy is a bimonthly peer-reviewed academic journal covering research on international political economy. It was established in 1996 and is published by Routledge. The editor-in-chief is Colin Hay (University of Sheffield and Sciences Po Paris).

It is one of the leading journals in International Political Economy, along with Review of International Political Economy.

== Abstracting and indexing ==
According to the Journal Citation Reports, the journal has a 2018 impact factor of 3.085, ranking it 46th out of 363 journals in the category "Economics", 20th out of 176 journals in the category "Political Science" and 8th out of 91 journals in the category "International Relations". The journal's 2020 impact factor is 4.681.

== See also ==
- List of political science journals
- List of international relations journals
- List of economics journals
