= Robert Gilpin =

American political scientist

- Born: July 2, 1930; Burlington, Vermont, U.S.
- Died: June 20, 2018 (aged 87); Waterbury, Vermont, U.S

Philosophical work
- Era: Contemporary philosophy
- Region: Western Philosophy
- School: Realism
- Main interests: International security, International political economy
- Notable ideas: Hegemonic stability theory

Robert Gilpin (/ˈɡɪlpɪn/; July 2, 1930 – June 20, 2018) was an American political scientist. He was Professor of Politics and International Affairs at the Woodrow Wilson School of Public and International Affairs at Princeton University.

Gilpin was an influential figure in the fields of international relations theory and international political economy. A "soft" realist, Gilpin argued that international economic affairs reflected state power, and that states' security interests shaped international economic cooperation. He was a proponent of what would become known as hegemonic stability theory, the notion that the international system is most likely to be stable in the presence of a hegemon.

== Education ==
Gilpin received his B.A. from the University of Vermont in 1952 and his M.S. from Cornell University in 1954. Following three years as an officer in the U.S. Navy, Gilpin completed his Ph.D. at the University of California, Berkeley, earning his doctorate in 1960.

== Career ==
Gilpin joined the Princeton faculty in 1962 and became full professor in 1970. He was a faculty associate of the Center of International Studies, and the Liechtenstein Institute on Self-Determination.

Gilpin was a Guggenheim fellow in 1969, a Rockefeller fellow from 1967 to 1968 and again from 1976 to 1977, and a fellow of the American Academy of Arts and Sciences. He was a member of the American Political Science Association for which he served as vice president from 1984 to 1985, and he was a member of the Council on Foreign Relations. Early in his career, Gilpin focused on conflict and national security, in particular nuclear weapons policy. Over time, his focus shifted to international political economy.

Gilpin described his view of international relations and international political economy from a "realist" standpoint. He characterized himself as a "soft" realist. He explained in his book Global Political Economy that he considered himself a "state-centric realist" in the tradition of prominent "classical realists" such as E. H. Carr and Hans Morgenthau. He has described Morgenthau, Carr and Hedley Bull as influences on his thinking, as well as Susan Strange, Raymond Vernon and Richard Cooper. Jonathan Kirshner has characterized Gilpin as a "classical realist".

An important figure in the field of International Political Economy (IPE), Gilpin's scholarship pushed back on claims made by liberal institutionalists such as Robert Keohane and Joseph Nye on the declining importance of state power in international economic affairs amid complex interdependence. Gilpin argued that states were still the key actors in the realm of economic relations and that security interests remained a key determinant of state behavior in economic affairs. Non-state actors were still fundamentally dependent on what states did. Gilpin was an influence on Stephen D. Krasner, Daniel Drezner, and Stephen G. Brooks. According to John Ikenberry, Gilpin's War and Change in World Politics "More than any other modern book on international relations theory, Gilpin’s [War and Change in World Politics] offers the most sweeping, elegant, and influential account of the rise and decline of leading states and the international orders they create."

Within IPE, Gilpin proposed an influential framework for organizing schools of political thought on the relationship between politics and economics into three: Mercantilism, Liberalism, and Marxism.

In his 1975 book US Power and the Multinational Corporation, Gilpin warned that multinational corporations could facilitate a rapid spread of advanced technologies away from the leading states to rising states, thus facilitating more rapid power transitions. Gilpin has described War and Change In World Politics (1981) as the work of his that he is most pleased with.

In 1979, Gilpin became the inaugural Dwight D. Eisenhower Professor in International Affairs, a position he held until his retirement in 1998.

In the final years of his career, Gilpin focused his research interests in the application of realist thinking to contemporary American policies in the Middle East. Gilpin was openly critical of the politics surrounding the 2003 invasion of Iraq in his essay "War is Too Important to Be Left to Ideological Amateurs."

== Bibliography ==
- American Scientists and Nuclear Weapons Policy (1962)
- France in the Age of the Scientific State (1968)
- US Power and the Multinational Corporation (1975)
- War and Change In World Politics (1981)
- The Political Economy of International Relations (1987)
- The Challenge of Global Capitalism (2000)
- Global Political Economy: Understanding the International Economic Order (2001)

These books have been translated into a number of languages. The Political Economy of International Relations won the 1987 Award for the Best New Professional and Scholarly Book in Business, Management, and Economics, as well as the 1988 Woodrow Wilson Foundation Book Award for the best book in political science

== See also ==
- Neorealism
- Neoclassical realism
