= Matthew Watson (political economist) =

Matthew Watson is a professor of political economy and international political economy (IPE) in University of Warwick's Department of Politics and International Studies. His work in the area of IPE has been published widely; he has solely authored five books, and had more than fifty articles published in peer reviewed academic journals on a wide range of issues in political economy and IPE.

His five books are Foundations of International Political Economy (Palgrave Macmillan, 2005) (which received a nomination for the IPEG Book of the Year Award 2004/2005), Political Economy of International Capital Mobility (Palgrave Macmillan, 2007), Uneconomic Economics and the Crisis of the Model World (Palgrave Macmillan, 2014), The Market (Agenda, 2018) and False Prophets of Economics Imperialism: The Limits of Mathematical Market Models (Agenda, 2024).

Between 2001 and 2007, Watson served as a member of the Steering Committee of the Standing Conference of Arts and Social Sciences.

Watson has also been an organiser of two of the Political Studies Association's specialist groups: the Labour Movements Specialist Group and the Political Economy Specialist Group. Additionally, he has acted as advisor to both Oxfam (on its fair trade campaign) and War on Want (on its Tobin tax and duty on foreign exchange transactions campaigns in the UK), and he has occasionally been consulted by Bloomberg.com as an expert on the UK's economic policy.

== Selected publications ==
- The Market (Agenda Publishing, 2018).
- Uneconomic Economics and the Crisis of the Model World (Palgrave Macmillan, 2014).
- Political Economy of International Capital Mobility (Palgrave Macmillan, 2007).
- Watson, Matthew (2007). "Trade Justice and Individual Consumption Choices: Adam Smith's Spectator Theory and the Moral Constitution of the Fair Trade Consumer". European Journal of International Relations. 13 (2): 263–288. doi:10.1177/1354066107076957. S2CID 146406192.
- "Towards a Polanyian Perspective on Fair Trade: Market-Bound Economic Agents and the Act of Ethical Consumption". Global Society. 20 (4): 435–451. 2006. doi:10.1080/13600820600929788. S2CID 143572862.
- Foundations of International Political Economy, Basingstoke: Palgrave Macmillan, 2005.
- Watson, Matthew (2005). "What Makes a Market Economy? Schumpeter, Smith and Walras on the Coordination Problem". New Political Economy. 10 (2): 143–161. doi:10.1080/13563460500144710. S2CID 153589031. (3rd place in the 2006 Templeton Enterprise Article)
