= Stephen D. Krasner =

American academic and former diplomat

Stephen Krasner

23rd Director of Policy Planning
- In office February 4, 2005 – April 20, 2007
- President: George W. Bush
- Preceded by: Mitchell B. Reiss
- Succeeded by: David F. Gordon

Personal details
- Born: Stephen David Krasner; February 15, 1942 (age 84)
- Education: Cornell University (BA); Columbia University (MA); Harvard University (PhD)

Stephen David Krasner (born February 15, 1942) is an American political scientist and former diplomat. Krasner has been a professor of international relations at Stanford University since 1981, and served as the Director of Policy Planning from 2005 to April 2007 while on leave from Stanford.

A realist, he is known for his contributions to the fields of international relations and international political economy.

== Early life and education ==
Krasner was born on February 15, 1942, in New York City. He was raised in Manhattan. He received his BA from the Department of History at Cornell University in 1963, where he was a member of the Quill and Dagger society. He earned his MA in international affairs from Columbia University. In 1972, he completed his PhD in political science at Harvard University. He wrote his PhD dissertation on the international coffee market. At Harvard, he was influenced by Albert Hirschman.

== Career ==
Before coming to Stanford University in 1981, Krasner taught at Harvard University and University of California, Los Angeles. He was the editor of International Organization from 1986 to 1992.

Krasner is the author of six books and over ninety articles. He has taught courses on international relations, international political economy, international relations theory, policy making, and state-building at Stanford University. He received a dean's award for excellence in teaching in 1991. At Stanford University, Krasner has been an advisor to Daniel Drezner and

Krasner was a key figure in establishing regime theory as a prominent topic of study in IR, in part through the 1983 edited collection International Regimes. Krasner is a key figure in the development of hegemonic stability theory. Krasner was influenced by Robert Gilpin.

He has written extensively about statehood and sovereignty.

Krasner is credited with incorporating the idea of punctuated equilibrium in social theory and contributing to critical juncture theory.

Krasner is a senior fellow at Stanford's Hoover Institution.

Krasner was named Director of Policy Planning in the State Department by his former Stanford University colleague Condoleezza Rice.

In 2020, Krasner, along with over 130 other former Republican national security officials, signed a statement that asserted that President Trump was unfit to serve another term, and "To that end, we are firmly convinced that it is in the best interest of our nation that Vice President Joe Biden be elected as the next President of the United States, and we will vote for him."

== Bibliography ==
- Are Bureaucracies Important? (1972)
- State Power and the Structure of International Trade (1976)
- Defending the National Interest: Raw Materials Investment and American Foreign Policy (1978)
- Structural Conflict: The Third World Against Global Liberalism (1985)
- Compromising Westphalia (1996)
- Sovereignty: Organized Hypocrisy (1999)
- Addressing State Failure (2005)
- Building Democracy After Conflict: The Case For Shared Sovereignty (2005)
- Power, the State, and Sovereignty: Essays on International Relations (2009)

=== Edited works ===
- International Regimes (1983)
- Exploration and Contestation in the Study of World Politics (co-editor, 1999)
- Problematic Sovereignty: Contested Rules and Political Possibilities (2001)

=== Selected articles ===
- "Think Again: Sovereignty". Foreign Policy. November 20, 2009.
- Krasner, Stephen D. 1984. "Approaches to the State: Alternative Conceptions and Historical Dynamics." Comparative Politics 16(2): 223–46;
- Krasner, Stephen D. 1988. "Sovereignty: An Institutional Perspective." Comparative Political Studies 21(1): 66–94.
