= Review of International Political Economy =

- Discipline: Political economy
- Language: English
- Edited by: Lena Rethel

Publication details
- History: 1994–present
- Publisher: Routledge
- Frequency: Bimonthly
- Impact factor: 4.146 (2021)

Standard abbreviations
- ISO 4: Rev. Int. Political Econ.

Indexing
- CODEN: RIPEFV
- ISSN: 0969-2290 (print); 1466-4526 (web)
- LCCN: 99103954
- JSTOR: 09692290
- OCLC no.: 30378162

Links
- Journal homepage; Online access; Online archive

The Review of International Political Economy is a bimonthly peer-reviewed academic journal covering international political economy. The journal was established in 1994, and is published by Routledge. The editor-in-chief is Lena Rethel (University of Warwick).

According to the Journal Citation Reports, the journal has a 2021 impact factor of 4.146.
