= International political economy =

Study of global economic governance

International political economy (IPE) is the study of how politics shapes the global economy and how the global economy shapes politics. A key focus in IPE is on the power of different actors such as nation states, international organizations and multinational corporations to shape the international economic system and the distributive consequences of international economic activity. It has been described as the study of "the political battle between the winners and losers of global economic exchange."

A central assumption of IPE theory is that international economic phenomena do not exist in any meaningful sense separate from the actors who regulate and control them. Alongside formal economic theories of international economics, trade, and finance, which are widely utilised within the discipline, IPE thus stresses the study of institutions, politics, and power relations in understanding the global economy.

The substantive issue areas of IPE are frequently divided into the four broad subject areas of 1. international trade, 2. the international monetary and financial system, 3. multinational corporations, and 4. economic development and inequality. Key actors of study may include international organizations, multinational corporations, and sovereign states.

International political economy initially emerged as a subdiscipline of international relations in the 1960s and 1970s, prompted by the growth of international economic institutions such as the World Bank, International Monetary Fund, and the General Agreement on Tariffs and Trade, alongside economic turmoils such as the fall of the gold standard, 1973 oil crisis, and 1970s recession. The study of multinational corporations also featured prominently in the early IPE, in close interaction with scholars in adjancent disciplines and the regulatory initiatives championed by the United Nations Centre on Transnational Corporations (1975–1992). IPE eventually developed into an independent field also linked to international economics and economic history, where scholars study the historical dynamics of the international political economy.

== History and emergence ==
International political economy has its historic roots in the discipline of political economy; the study of the national economy and its interactions with governance and politics. Adam Smith's publication of The Wealth of Nations profoundly influenced the development of the field of political economy.

While the newly founded discipline of economics; which studies economic phenomena absent of political and social considerations; began to diverge from political economy studies in the late 19th century, political economy continued to live as an academic tradition within political science departments, as well as within modern economics as a pluralist approach. While notable works from John Maynard Keynes' General Theory and Karl Polanyi's The Great Transformation published in the early 20th century are still written in the tradition of political economy, economics in its narrower form was dominating economics departments from the 1920s and onward.

The emergence of international political economy can be traced to the late 1960s and early 1970s, when deepening economic interdependence prompted by the growth of post-war economic institutions such as the International Monetary Fund, World Bank, and General Agreement on Tariffs and Trade, drew increasing attention within international relations scholarship towards the study of these institutions, and more broadly, to the study of governance of the world economy. The need for a more comprehensive understanding on global economic governance within political science circles became increasingly apparent through the crises of the 1970s; with the end of the gold standard, the 1973 oil crisis, 1973-1975 recession and calls for greater trade protection. Influential figures in the emergence of the discipline were international relations scholars Robert Keohane, Joseph Nye and Robert Gilpin in the United States, as well as Susan Strange in the United Kingdom. IPE has since become a key pillar in political science departments as well as a major subdiscipline of international relations, alongside traditional international relations scholarship centred on material security.

== Topics of enquiry ==
=== International Finance ===
International finance and monetary relations is one of the core areas of study in IPE. In IPE scholarship, the interrelation of economic and political interests in international finance assumes it impossible to separate the financial system from international politics in any meaningful sense. The IPE of international finance is characterized by political network effects and international externalities, such as beggar-thy-neighbour effects and contagions.

A key concept in IPE literature on international finance is the impossible trinity, derived from the Mundell–Fleming model, which holds that it is impossible to simultaneously pursue all of the following three economic policies:

- a fixed foreign exchange rate
- free capital movement; absence of capital controls
- an independent monetary policy

Another key dilemma in monetary policy is that governments have to balance the inflation rate (the price of money at home) and the exchange rate (the price of money outside the home market).

There is no agreement in the economics literature on the optimal national exchange rate policy. Rather, national exchange rate regimes reflect political considerations. National exchange rate policies can be 1. fixed, floating, or a hybrid of the two, and 2. entail a strong or weak currency. Different groups benefit disproportionately depending on the national exchange rate policies that is chosen.

The liberal view point generally has been strong in Western academia since it was first articulated by Smith in the eighteenth century. Only during the 1940s to early 1970s did an alternative system, Keynesianism, command wide support in universities. Keynes was concerned chiefly with domestic macroeconomic policy. The Keynesian consensus was challenged by Friedrich Hayek and later Milton Friedman and other scholars out of Chicago as early as the 1950s, and by the 1970s, Keynes' influence on public discourse and economic policy making had somewhat faded.

Illustration of the impossible trinity in IPE finance scholarship; inspired by the Mundell-Fleming model in international economics. The theory postulates that a state may not have any more than two of the following policies in place at the same time; a fixed exchange rate, free capital movement, and an independent national monetary policy.

After World War II, the Bretton Woods system was established, reflecting the political orientation described as embedded liberalism. In 1971 President Richard Nixon ended the convertibility of gold that had been established under the IMF in the Bretton Woods system. Interim agreements followed. Nonetheless, until 2008 the trend has been for increasing liberalization of both international trade and finance. From later 2008 world leaders have also been increasingly calling for a New Bretton Woods System.

Topics such as the International Monetary Fund, Financial Crises (see 2008 financial crisis and 1997 Asian financial crisis), exchange rates, Foreign Direct Investment, Multinational Corporations receive much attention in IPE.

=== International Trade ===
There are multiple approaches to trade within IPE. These approaches seek to explain international bargaining between states, as well as the foreign economic policies that states adopt. In terms of domestic explanations for the foreign economic policies of states, the two dominant approaches are the factor model and sector model, both of which build on David Ricardo's theory of comparative advantage.

The factor model (which has been called the H-O-S-S model) is shaped by the Heckscher-Ohlin model and the Stolper-Samuelsson theorem. According to the Heckscher-Ohlin model of trade, the comparative advantage of countries in trade stems from their endowments of particular factors of trade (land, labor, capital). This means that a country abundant in land will primarily export land-intensive products (such as agriculture), whereas a country abundant in capital will export capital-intensive products (such as high-technology manufacturing) and a country abundant in labor will export labor-intensive products (such as textiles). Building on this model, the Stolper-Samuelsson theorem holds that groups that possess the factors will support or oppose trade depending on the abundance or scarcity of the factors. This means that in a country which is abundant in land and scarce in capital, farmers will support free trade whereas producers in capital-intensive manufacturing will oppose free trade. The factor model predicts that labor in developed countries will oppose trade liberalization (because it is relatively scarce), whereas labor in developing countries will support free trade (because it is relatively abundant).

Building on these insights, influential research by Ronald Rogowski argued that factor endowments predicted whether countries were characterized by class-conflict (capital vs. labor) or urban-rural conflict. Similarly, an influential study by Helen Milner and Keiko Kubota argues that factor endowments explain why developing countries liberalize their trade after they democratize (the abundant factor, labor, supports trade liberalization). A 2023 study by Milner and Lindsay R. Dolan found that factor endowments help explain trade preferences in Africa. Research has substantiated the predictions of the Stolper-Samuelsson theorem, showing that trade openness tends to reduce inequality in developing countries, but exacerbate it in advanced economies.

The sectors model of trade, the Ricardo–Viner model (named after David Ricardo and Jacob Viner), challenges the notion that factors are key to understanding trade preferences. Factors can be highly immobile, which means that capital-owners and labor who work in a particular sector may have similar interests. As a consequence, trade preferences are better understood by examining which economic sectors win or lose on trade liberalization. Whereas the factor model assumes that capital-owners in different sectors have similar trade preferences and that labor across different sector have similar trade preferences, the Ricardo-Viner model holds that in sectors where factors are immobile, labor and capital-owners in one sector may have the same trade preferences. As a result, the Ricardo-Viner model predicts that class conflict over trade is more likely when factors are highly mobile, but that industry-based conflict is more likely when factors are immobile.

Adam Dean has challenged the economic assumptions in both models, arguing that workers' wages do not consistently correspond to increases in productivity in a given industry (contradicting Ricardo-Viner) nor do workers consistently benefit from import restrictions when labor is the scarce factor of endowment (contradicting Heckscher-Ohlin). The degree to which Ricardo-Viner and Heckscher-Ohlin are correct is conditioned by whether workers have profit-sharing institutions or are unionized (which helps them to bargain for higher wages amid productivity increases). He has also challenged Milner and Kubota's study on trade liberalization in developing countries, as he shows that democratic developing countries frequently repressed labor unions amid trade liberalization.

Studies by Dani Rodrik and Anna Mayda, as well as Kenneth Scheve and Matthew J. Slaughter have found support for the factor models, as they show that there is greater support for trade openness in developing countries (where labor is abundant and thus benefits from trade openness). Other studies find no support for either model, and argue that the models have limited explanatory value. A 2022 study in the Journal of Politics found that comparative advantage predicts attitudes on free trade among individuals and legislators. According to a 2017 assessment by Thomas Oatley, there are "no strong conclusions" in IPE scholarship as to which of these models better characterizes the sources of individual trade policies.

Aside from the sector and factor models, there are firm-specific models of trade preferences (some times described as "New new" trade theory) which predict that those who work for large, productive and globally oriented firms support trade liberalization (as well as free movement of capital and labor), whereas employees in smaller firms are less supportive of free trade. Economic geography approaches explain trade policies by looking at the regions that benefit and lose on globalization; it predicts that large cities support trade liberalization and that left-behind regions push back on liberalization. Other alternative models to the factor and sector models may explain individual preferences through demographic data (age, class, skills, education, gender), as well as ideology and culture. Some studies have raised questions about whether individuals understand the effects of trade protectionism, which puts doubt on theories that assume that trade policy preferences are rooted in economic self-interest.

Trade may in and of itself alter domestic politics, including the trade preferences of the public. A 1988 study by Helen Milner found that trade openness substantially increased support for free trade by strengthening the position of firms that stand to lose from trade protectionism. Influential studies by David Cameron, Dani Rodrik and Peter Katzenstein have affirmed the insights of the Double Movement, as they show that greater trade openness has been associated with increases in government social spending.

In terms of how preferences get aggregated and reconciled into foreign economic policies, IPE scholars have pointed to collective action problems, electoral systems, regime types, veto points, the nature of the legislative trade policy process, the interaction between domestic and international bargaining, and the interactions between political elites and epistemic communities. Some IPE scholarship de-emphasizes the role of domestic politics and points to international processes as shapers of trade policy. Some scholars have argued for a "new interdependence approach", which restores insights from the complex interdependence of the 1970s, but emphasizes network effects, control over central nodes, and path dependence.

=== Economic development ===
IPE is also concerned with development economics and explaining how and why countries develop.

== Historical IPE approaches ==
Historically, three prominent approaches to IPE were the liberal, economic nationalist (mercantilist), and marxist perspectives. Political economist Thomas Oatley traces the development of these economic ideologies, from mercantilism in the 1600s, which emphasizes competition among states for economic dominance, through liberalism in the 1700s, which emphasizes maximizing productivity through comparative advantage, to Marxism in the 1800s, which emphasizes competition among groups for economic dominance. This approach privileges the standard (or orthodox) economic theory of individual-centered liberalism as uniquely demonstrating positive-sum societal outcomes.

Economic Ideology	Societal Outcome
State-centered mercantilism (e.g., "America first!")	Zero-sum conflict States compete for dominance.
Individual-centered liberalism (e.g., doux commerce)	Positive-sum harmony Trade promotes peace.
Group-centered Marxism (e.g., authoritarian communism)	Zero-sum conflict Groups compete for dominance.

Economic liberals tend to oppose government intervention in the market when it inhibits free trade and open competition, but support government intervention to protect property rights and resolve market failures. Economic liberals commonly adhere to a political and economic philosophy which advocates a restrained fiscal policy and the balancing of budgets, through measures such as low taxes, reduced government spending, and minimized government debt.

To economic nationalists, markets are subordinate to the state, and should serve the interests of the state (such as providing national security and accumulating military power). The doctrine of mercantilism is a prominent variant of economic nationalism. Economic nationalists tend to see international trade as zero-sum, where the goal is to derive relative gains (as opposed to mutual gains). Economic nationalism tends to emphasize industrialization (and often aids industries with state support), due to beliefs that industry has positive spillover effects on the rest of the economy, enhances the self-sufficiency and political autonomy of the country, and is a crucial aspect in building military power.

This conceptual and theoretical approach has been incorporated into the study of public opinion, generally, and fiscal policy preferences, specifically, to conceptualize Americans' policy preferences and political ideology in the context of the United States. In popular culture, the book Trekonomics by Manu Saadia examines the science fiction multiverse of Star Trek through the lens of individual-centered liberalism that arises in the American context, commercial republicanism. Both academic and popular perspectives converge on universal basic income as an important focus for future research in international political economy that integrates, synthesizes, and extends the mercantilist, liberal, and Marxist perspectives.

== Modern IPE approaches ==
There are several prominent approaches to IPE. The dominant paradigm is Open Economy Politics. Other influential approaches include dependency theory, hegemonic stability theory, and domestic political theories of IPE.

Early modern IPE scholarship employed a diversity of methods and did both grand theory and middle range theory, but over time, the scholarship has become more quantitative and focused on middle-range theories. Robert Jervis wrote in 1998, "the IPE subfield, after a marvelous period of development in the 1970s and 1980s seems to be stagnating."

The first wave of IPE scholarship focused on complex interdependence and the evolution of global systems of economic exchange. This scholarship focused on hegemonic stability theory, complex interdependence, and regimes. The second wave sought to explain the domestic sources of global economic cooperation or explain how global processes influence domestic policy-making. The third wave increasingly focused on explaining the micro-foundations of policy. According to Benjamin Cohen, "in terms of theory, consensus is often lacking on even the most basic causal relationships" in IPE scholarship.

=== Open Economy Politics ===
Open Economy Politics (OEP) can be traced to domestic political theories of IPE; OEP emerged in the late 1990s. OEP adopts the assumptions of neoclassical economics and international trade theory. It strongly emphasizes microfoundations. It has been characterized as employing rationalism, materialism and liberalism. According to David Lake,

1. Interests: "OEP begins with individuals, sectors, or factors of production as the units of analysis and derives their interests over economic policy from each unit's position within the international economy."
2. Domestic institutions: "It conceives of domestic political institutions as mechanisms that aggregate interests (with more or less bias) and structure the bargaining of competing societal groups."
3. International bargaining: "It introduces, when necessary, bargaining between states with different interests. Analysis within OEP proceeds from the most micro- to the most macro-level in a linear and orderly fashion, reflecting an implicit uni-directional conception of politics as flowing up from individuals to interstate bargaining."

Thomas Oatley has criticized OEP for an overemphasis on domestic political processes and for failing to consider the interplay between processes at the domestic level and macro processes at the global level: in essence, OEP scholarship suffers from omitted variable bias. According to Peter Katzenstein, Robert Keohane and Stephen Krasner, scholarship in this vein assumes that actors' preferences and behavior are derived from their material position, which leads to a neglect of the ways in which variation in information may shape actor preferences and behaviors. Mark Blyth and Matthias Matthijs argue that OEP scholarship essentially black boxes the global economy. Stephanie Rickard has defended the OEP approach, writing in 2021:

OEP has matured and developed over the past decade. As a framework, it has proven to be enormously productive and adaptable—integrating diverse economic phenomena under a common theoretical umbrella and providing a framework flexible enough to react to significant events in the global economy... The accumulating body of scholarship in the OEP tradition has moved our understanding of world politics decisively forward. Critics of OEP have yet to offer an alternative, more empirically powerful theory and as a result, OEP continues to progress as the dominant paradigm in IPE research.

Scholars have questioned the empirical validity of the models derived from OEP scholarship on money and trade, as well as questioned the ability of OEP scholarship to explain momentous events in global political economy. Challengers to the OEP framework include behavioral approaches (which do not necessarily accept that individual interests stem from material incentives), and economic geography approaches. According to Stephanie Rickard, OEP scholars have modified their models to incorporate incomplete information (which affects how individual preferences are formed) and economies of scale (which affects the distribution of gains and losses). Erica Owen and Stephanie Walter similarly argue that "second-generation" OEP frameworks incorporate both material and ideational preferences.

=== Dependency theory ===
Dependency theory is the notion that resources flow from a "periphery" of poor and underdeveloped states to a "core" of wealthy states, enriching the latter at the expense of the former, in unequal exchange. It is a central contention of dependency theory that poor states are impoverished and rich ones enriched by the way poor states are integrated into the "world system". This theory was officially developed in the late 1960s following World War II, as scholars searched for the root issue in the lack of development in Latin America.

Dependency theory and world systems theory are not mainstream economic theory.

=== Hegemonic stability theory ===
Early IPE scholarship was focused on the implications of hegemony on international economic affairs. In the 1970s, US hegemony appeared to be on the fall, which prompted scholars to consider the likely effects of this falling. Robert Keohane coined the term Hegemonic stability theory in a 1980 article for the notion that the international system is more likely to remain stable when a single nation-state is the dominant world power, or hegemon. Keohane's 1984 book After Hegemony, used insights from the new institutional economics, to argue that the international system could remain stable in the absence of a hegemon.

=== American vs. British IPE ===
Benjamin Cohen provides a detailed intellectual history of IPE identifying American and British camps. The Americans are positivist and attempt to develop intermediate level theories that are supported by some form of quantitative evidence. British IPE is more "interpretivist" and looks for "grand theories". They use very different standards of empirical work. Cohen sees benefits in both approaches. A special edition of New Political Economy has been issued on The 'British School' of IPE and a special edition of the Review of International Political Economy (RIPE) on American IPE.

== Journals ==
The leading journal for IPE scholarship is the generalist international relations journal International Organization. International Organization played an instrumental role in making IPE one of the prominent subfields in IR. The leading IPE-specific journals are the Review of International Political Economy and New Political Economy. Examples of journals within the historical study of IPE are Economic History Review and History of Political Economy.

== Professional associations ==
- British International Studies Association - International Political Economy Group (BISA-IPEG)
- International Studies Association - International Political Economy Section (ISA-IPE)
- ISA-IPE Mailing List
