= Coral Bell =

Australian academic

Coral Bell AO
- Bell at the Lowy Institute in 2008
- Born: 30 March 1923; Sydney, Australia
- Died: 26 September 2012 (aged 89); Canberra, Australia
- Other name: Coral Mary Bell

Academic background
- Education: University of Sydney; London School of Economics
- Academic advisor: Martin Wight

Academic work
- Discipline: Political studies
- Sub-discipline: International relations
- School or tradition: Classical realism
- Institutions: University of Manchester; University of Sydney; London School of Economics; University of Sussex; Australian National University
- Main interests: Power politics

Coral Mary Bell AO (30 March 1923 – 26 September 2012) was an Australian academic at the University of Sussex, the London School of Economics, and the Australian National University, who wrote extensively about international relations and power politics.

== Early life and education ==
Coral Bell was born in Gladesville, a suburb of Sydney, Australia, on 30 March 1923. She was the middle of three children. She attended Sydney Girls High School and won a scholarship to the University of Sydney, where she completed a Bachelor of Arts degree in 1944. After graduation she joined the Australian Diplomatic Service in the Department of External Affairs in Canberra. At this time the Foreign Minister was H. V. Evatt and Bell believed that he tolerated the lax security she observed in the department. As a junior there she worked alongside colleagues who were subsequently alleged to be members of a Soviet spy ring, notably Jim Hill and Ric Throssell, who she believed had tried unsuccessfully to recruit her in 1947. The Royal Commission on Espionage investigated the allegations after the defection of Vladimir Petrov in 1954 but while it concluded that the Soviet embassy in Canberra had been used for espionage it recommended that no prosecutions should be pursued. Meanwhile, Bell had been posted to Wellington in 1948, where she worked on the ANZUS Treaty and was present at its signing ceremony. She resigned from the department in 1951.

== Academic career ==
Bell moved to London to begin her academic career at the LSE in London, where she completed an MSc supervised by Martin Wight. During this period she was also employed as a research officer at the Royal Institute of International Affairs (Chatham House) where the historian Arnold J. Toynbee gave her responsibility for writing the 1954 edition of its Survey of International Affairs. In 1956 she was appointed the first international relations lecturer at Manchester University and began writing her PhD. With the support of the departmental professor, W. J. M. Mackenzie, Bell spent 1958 on a Rockefeller Fellowship which took her to the US at the School of Advanced International Studies at Johns Hopkins University in Washington, DC, and Columbia University in New York. This allowed her to meet a number of key figures who were formulating US foreign policy, including Paul Nitze and Robert Oppenheimer, with whom she discussed the still-secret National Security Council policy paper, NSC 68, written by Nitze.

In 1961, Bell was appointed the first Senior Lecturer in International Relations at the University of Sydney. However, she returned to England to a Readership at the LSE in 1965. In 1972 she became a professor of International Relations at the University of Sussex and was a member of the International Institute for Strategic Studies. From 1977 to her formal retirement in 1988 she was a Senior Research Fellow in the department of International Relations at the Australian National University. Subsequently, until her death in 2012, she was a visiting fellow at the ANU Strategic and Defence Studies Centre.

== Impact ==
Bell has been called a classical realist or an optimistic realist. Denis Healey acknowledged that "from the middle fifties Australia has contributed more to international understanding of defence problems than any country of similar size" in reference to Hedley Bull, Larry Martin and Bell. In tribute to Bell, Henry Kissinger wrote "the Australian scholar Coral Bell has brilliantly described America's challenge: to recognise its own pre-eminence but to conduct its policy as if it were still living in a world of many centres of power". In discussing US–China relations, Bell coined the term "shadow condominium" to describe how, in times of severe crisis, these countries would collaborate while maintaining a more adversarial position at other times. Bell believed that the US was no longer the sole superpower and that others would share this role.

== Honours and awards ==
In 2005, Bell was awarded an Officership in the general division of the Order of Australia "for service to scholarship and to teaching as a leading commentator and contributor to foreign and defence policy debate internationally and in Australia". In 2015, the Research School for Pacific Studies was renamed the Coral Bell School of Asia Pacific Affairs in her honour.

== Publications ==
A full list of Bell's publications is available.

=== Selected books and monographs ===
- Survey of International Affairs, 1954. London: Oxford University Press. 1957. p. 329.
- Negotiation from Strength: A Study in the Politics of Power. London: Chatto & Windus. 1962. p. 223. (based on her PhD thesis) 1977 reprint. ISBN 083719508X. LCCN 77001054.
- The Debatable Alliance: An Essay in Anglo-American Relations. London: Oxford University Press. 1964.
- The Conventions of Crisis: A Study in Diplomatic Management. London: Oxford University Press. 1971. ISBN 978-0192850546.
- The Diplomacy of Détente: The Kissinger Era. London: Martin Robertson. 1977. ISBN 978-0855201913.
- President Carter and Foreign Policy: The Costs of Virtue?. The Australian National University. 1982. ISBN 978-0908160990.
- Dependent Ally: A Study of Australia's Relations with the United States and the United Kingdom Since the Fall of Singapore. The Australian National University. 1984. ISBN 978-0867845709.
- A Study in Australian Foreign Policy (Dependent Ally). London: Oxford University Press. 1988. ISBN 978-0195547474.
- The Reagan Paradox: American Foreign Policy in the 1980s. Aldershot: Edward Elgar. 1989. ISBN 978-1852782030.
- A World Out of Balance: American Ascendancy and International Politics in the 21st Century. Longueville Media. 2003. ISBN 978-1920681074.
- The Next Landscape of World Politics: The End of the Vasco da Gama Era. Longueville Media. 2007. ISBN 9781921004315.
