= In Defense of the National Interest =

1951 book by Hans Morgenthau

- Author: Hans Morgenthau
- Publisher: Knopf
- Publication date: 1951

In Defense of the National Interest (full title In Defense of the National interest: A Critical Examination of American Foreign Policy) is a 1951 book by realist academic Hans Morgenthau. The book is a critique of what Morgenthau calls 'deeply ingrained habits of thought and preconceptions as to the nature of foreign policy in the United States'.

== See also ==
- Politics Among Nations
- Scientific Man versus Power Politics
