= Power politics =

International relations theory that a state's goal is to further its interests

Power politics is a term which denotes an approach to political matters which aims to enhance the power of government actors. The term has much usage in the realm of international relations, and it is often used pejoratively.

The term particularly refers to international relations between independent states that recognize no higher political authority. These states are sovereign political units that maintain continuous and organized relationships with one another. These relationships include diplomacy, trade, peace, and war.

== Cyclical theories of power politics ==
=== George Modelski ===
George Modelski defines global order as a 'management network centred on a lead unit and contenders for leadership, (pursuing) collective action at the global level'. The system is allegedly cyclical. Each cycle is about 100 years' duration and a new hegemonic power appears each time:

1. Portugal 1492–1580; in the Age of Discovery
2. The Netherlands 1580–1688; beginning with the Eighty Years' War, 1579–1588
3. The United Kingdom (1) 1688–1792; beginning with the wars of Louis XIV
4. United Kingdom (2) 1792–1914; beginning with the French Revolution and Napoleonic wars
5. The United States 1914 to (predicted) 2030; beginning with World War I and two.

Each cycle has four phases;

1. Global war, which a) involves almost all global powers, b) is 'characteristically naval' c) is caused by a system breakdown, d) is extremely lethal, e) results in a new global leader, capable of tackling global problems. The war is a 'decision process' analogous to a national election. The Thirty Years War, though lasting and destructive, was not a 'global war'.
2. World power, which lasts for 'about one generation'. The new incumbent power 'prioritises global problems', mobilises a coalition, is decisive and innovative. Pre-modern communities become dependent on the hegemonic power.
3. Delegitimation. This phase can last for 20–27 years; the hegemonic power falters, as rival powers assert new nationalistic policies.
4. Deconcentration. The hegemony's problem-solving capacity declines. It yields to a multipolar order of warring rivals. Pre-modern communities become less dependent. A challenger appears (successively, Spain, France, France, Germany, and the USSR) and a new global war ensues.

The hegemonic nations tend to have: 'insular geography'; a stable, open society; a strong economy; strategic organisation, and strong political parties. By contrast, the 'challenger' nations have: closed systems; absolute rulers; domestic instability; and continental geographic locations.

The long cycle system is repetitive, but also evolutionary. According to Modelski, it originated in about 1493 through a) the decline of Venetian naval power, b) Chinese abandonment of naval exploration, and c) discovery of sea routes to India and the Americas. It has developed in parallel with the growth of the nation-state, political parties, command of the sea, and 'dependency of pre-modern communities'. The system is flawed, lacking in coherence, solidarity, and capacity to address the North-South divide. Modelski speculates that US deconcentration might be replaced by a power based in the 'Pacific rim' or by an explicit coalition of nations, as 'co-operation is urgently required in respect of nuclear weapons'.

Modelski 'dismisses the idea that international relations are anarchic'. His research, influenced by Immanuel Wallerstein, was 'measured in decades... a major achievement' says Peter J. Taylor.

=== Joshua S. Goldstein ===
Goldstein in 1988 posited a 'hegemony cycle' of 150 years' duration, the four hegemonic powers since 1494 being;

1. Hapsburg Spain, 1494–1648; ended by the Thirty Years War, in which Spain itself was the 'challenger'; the Treaty of Westphalia and the beginnings of the nation-state.
2. The Netherlands, 1648–1815; ended by the challenge from France of the revolutionary and Napoleonic wars, the Treaty of Vienna and introduction of the Congress System
3. Great Britain, 1815–1945; ended by Germany's challenge in two World Wars, and the postwar settlement, including the World Bank, IMF, GATT, the United Nations and NATO
4. The United States, since 1945.

Goldstein suggests that US hegemony may 'at an indeterminate time' be challenged and ended by China (the 'best fit'), by western Europe, Japan, or (writing in 1988) the USSR. The situation is unstable due to the continuance of Machiavellian power politics and the deployment of nuclear weapons. The choice lies between 'global cooperation or global suicide'. Thus there may be 'an end to hegemony itself'.

Goldstein speculates that Venetian hegemony, ceded to Spain in 1494, may have begun in 1350.

== Machtpolitik ==
The German version is Machtpolitik. It celebrates the idea of conflict between nations as a means of asserting the national will and strengthening the state. This idea is somewhat related to "Realpolitik", but it specifically acknowledges that the German Empire was established through the use of force by the Prussian military and Otto von Bismarck's diplomacy. It also reflects a romanticized view of military virtues and the belief that international conflicts have a moral purpose. For instance, Helmuth von Moltke the Elder, who was instrumental in Prussia's victories over Denmark, Austria, and France, once expressed a Machtpolitik sentiment by saying that "war is a part of the divine order of the world." This concept is also linked to militarism and social Darwinism.

== See also ==
- Great power
- Colonialism
- Expansionism
- Global policeman
- Imperialism
- Power (political science)
- Power Politics (Wight book)
- Realism (international relations)
- Realpolitik

== Bibliography ==
- de Wijk, Rob (2016). Power politics: How China and Russia reshape the world. Amsterdam University Press.
- Ganguly, Keya (15 September 2014). "Machtpolitik". In Coole, Diana; Ellis, Elisabeth; Ferguson, Kennan (eds.). The encyclopedia of political thought. Chichester, UK: Wiley-Blackwell. pp. 2224–2225. doi:10.1002/9781118474396.wbept0631. ISBN 978-1-4051-9129-6.
- Goldstein, J. S. (1988). Long cycles; Prosperity and war in the modern age (PDF).
- Hans Köchler, "The United Nations Organization and Global Power Politics: The Antagonism between Power and Law and the Future of World Order," in: Chinese Journal of International Law, Vol. 5, No. 2 (2006), pp. 323–340. ABSTRACT
- Lemke, Douglas (October 2008). "Power politics and wars without states". American Journal of Political Science. 52 (Midwest Political Science Association): 774–786. doi:10.1111/j.1540-5907.2008.00342.x. JSTOR 25193849.
- Michael Mann, The Sources of Social Power, voll. 1–4, Cambridge University Press, Cambridge-New York, 1986–2012.
- John Mearsheimer, The Tragedy of Great Power Politics. New York: W.W. Norton & Company, 2001.
- Modelski, George (1987). Long cycles in world politics. Palgrave Macmillan UK. ISBN 978-1-349-09151-5.
  - Taylor, Peter J. (1989). "Modelski. Long cycles in world politics". Progress in Human Geography (Book review). 13 (2): 302–304. doi:10.1177/030913258901300221. ISSN 0309-1325.
- Hans J. Morgenthau, Scientific Man vs. Power Politics. Chicago: The University of Chicago Press, 1946.
- Hans J. Morgenthau, Politics Among Nations: The Struggle for Power and Peace. New York NY: Alfred A. Knopf, 1948.
- Geoff Mulgan, Good and Bad Power, Penguin, 2005.
- Wight, Martin (2002-06-18) [1978]. Bull, Hedley; Holbraand, Carsten (eds.). Power politics. New York City: Continuum. ISBN 978-0-8264-6174-2.
- Zaleznik, Abraham (May–June 1970). "Power and Politics in Organizational Life". Harvard Business Review.
