= Adam Watson =

British International relations theorist and researcher

Adam Watson CMG
- Born: John Hugh Watson; 10 August 1914
- Died: 24 August 2007 (aged 93)

Education
- Education: King's College, Cambridge

Philosophical work
- School: English School
- Institutions: University of Virginia; Australian National University
- Main interests: international relations

John Hugh "Adam" Watson CMG (10 August 1914 – 24 August 2007) was a British International relations theorist and researcher. Alongside Hedley Bull, Martin Wight, Herbert Butterfield, and others, he was one of the founding members of the English school of international relations theory.

== Biography ==
He was born John Hugh Watson and educated at Rugby and King's College, Cambridge. As an undergraduate at Cambridge, where he read History, Watson was taught by Herbert Butterfield (later Sir Herbert, and Regius Professor of History). After a period of travel in central Europe in the late 1930s, he joined the British Diplomatic Service in 1937, taking the nickname Adam "after noticing that every head in the Foreign Office seemed to turn when someone asked for John". During the Second World War he acted as a liaison with the Free French in Cairo, played an unknown role in the Balkans, based in Bucharest, and was finally posted to Moscow, where he witnessed the victory celebrations of 1945, standing alongside the Soviet Politburo and where he remained for the next four years.

In 1949 Watson joined the Foreign Office's new Information Research Department (IRD), which the historian Richard Aldrich has described as a 'covert political warfare section', as successor to the Political Warfare Executive (PWE) that had operated during the Second World War. A key figure in this organisation, he was first assistant to its Head, Ralph Murray, with the job of recruiting 'left-of-centre intellectuals' for the production of anti-communist 'grey' propaganda, and was later posted to Washington. In the USA he served as Britain's 'psywar [psychological warfare] liaison officer' (Aldrich) in Washington between 1950 and sometime in the mid-1950s, before becoming Head of the African Department of the Foreign Office during the Suez Crisis of 1956. He served as Her Majesty's Ambassador to Mali (1960–61), Senegal, Mauritania and Togo (1960–62), and finally Cuba (1962–66). He returned to London in 1966 to spend two years as Assistant Under-Secretary of State at the Foreign Office before retiring early. After a period with British Leyland in the late 1960s, he entered academia, first at the Australian National University, at the invitation of Hedley Bull, and then in the United States, where he was Professor of International Studies at the University of Virginia.

In the late 1950s, it is likely that, given his extensive contacts in the United States and together with Kenneth W. Thompson, Watson was instrumental in facilitating the funding of the British Committee on the Theory of International Politics, chaired in its early years by his former supervisor, Butterfield, and funded by the Rockefeller Foundation. Watson became a member of Committee, attending when he was in the UK, and later becoming its third chairman, in succession to Butterfield and to Martin Wight. He was instrumental in the production of The Expansion of International Society (1984), edited with Hedley Bull, a key text of the English school of international relations. He also wrote a number of other significant works, including The Nature and Problems of the Third World (1968), Diplomacy (1982) and The Evolution of International Society (1992), a wide-ranging comparative study of historical international systems.

== Works ==
- 1952 Problems of Adjustment in the Middle East (Annals of the American Academy of Political and Social Science, vol. 282)
- 1964 The War of the Goldsmith's Daughter (Chatto & Windus)
- 1984 (ed. with H. Bull) The Expansion of International Society (Clarendon Press)
- 1992 The Evolution of International Society: A Comparative Historical Analysis (Routledge)
- 1997 The Limits of Independence (Routledge)
- 1998 The British Committee for the Theory of International Politics, some historical notes (University of Leeds)
- 2002 International Relations and the Practice of Hegemony (University of Leeds)
- 2002 Recollection of my discussions with Hedley Bull about the place in the history of International Relations of the idea of the Anarchical Society (University of Leeds)
- 2004 Diplomacy: The Dialogue Between States, 2nd ed. (Routledge)
- 2007 Hegemony & History (Routledge)

== Sources ==
- Richard J. Aldrich, The Hidden Hand: Britain, America and Cold War Secret Intelligence (Woodstock & New York: Overlook, 2002)
- Adam Bernstein, J. H. Watson, 93; British Envoy, Scholar, obituary, Washington Post, 14 September 2007
