= Global politics =

Political and economic patterns of the world

Global politics, also known as world politics, names both the discipline that studies the political and economic patterns of the world and the field that is being studied. At the centre of that field are the different processes of political globalization in relation to questions of social power.

The discipline studies the relationships between cities, nation-states, shell-states, multinational corporations, non-governmental organizations and international organizations. Current areas of discussion include national and ethnic conflict regulation, democracy and the politics of national self-determination, globalization and its relationship to democracy, conflict and peace studies, comparative politics, political economy, and the international political economy of the environment. One important area of global politics is contestation in the global political sphere over legitimacy.

Global politics is said by some to be distinct from the field of international politics (commonly seen as a branch of international relations), as it "does not stress the primacy of intergovernmental relations and transactions". This distinction however has not always been held among authors and political scientists, who often use the term "international politics" to mean global politics.

It has been suggested that global politics may be best understood as an "imaginary" of a political space existing beyond the sub-national, national, and international. This imaginary structures global politics as both a field of study and a set of practices, and though it only rose to prominence in the late twentieth century, has longer historical roots stretching back at least to the creation of medieval mappa mundi and to first contact between Afro-Eurasia and the Americas through colonialism and the Age of Sail.

== Defining the field ==
Beginning in the late nineteenth century, several groups extended the definition of the political community beyond nation-states to include much, if not all, of humanity. These internationalists include Marxists, human rights advocates, environmentalists, peace activists, feminists, and minority groups. This was the general direction of thinking on global politics, though the term was not used as such. The way in which modern world politics is implemented is structured by a set of interpretations dating back to the rise of the European powers. They were able to overtake the rest of the world in terms of economic and military power. Europeans, with their global supremacy, imposed their own system and views on others, through envisioning the world as a whole and defining the regions of the world as 'modern' or 'backward'. They saw nation statehood as the best and highest form of political organization, therefore viewing world politics as the result of the pursuit of hegemony by competing states.

The modern world politics perspective is often identified with the works, in particular their 1972 work Transnational Relations and World Politics. Here, the authors argued that state-centric views of international relations were inadequate frameworks to utilize in political science or international relations studies due to the increased globalization. Today, the practices of global politics are defined by values: norms of human rights, ideas of human development, and beliefs such as Internationalism or cosmopolitanism about how we should relate to each. Over the last couple of decades cosmopolitanism has become one of the key contested ideologies of global politics:

Cosmopolitanism can be defined as a global politics that, firstly, projects a sociality of common political engagement among all human beings across the globe, and, secondly, suggests that this sociality should be either ethically or organizationally privileged over other forms of sociality.

The intensification of globalization led some writers to suggest that states were no longer relevant to global politics. This view has been subject to debate:

On the other hand, other commentators have been arguing that states have remained essential to global politics. They have facilitated globalizing processes and projects; not been eclipsed by them. They have been rejuvenated because, among other reasons, they are still the primary providers of (military) security in the global arena; they are still the paramount loci for articulating the voices of (procedurally democratic) national communities, and for ordering their interactions with similar polities; and finally, they are indispensable to relations of (unequal) economic exchange insofar as they legitimize and enforce the global legal frameworks that enable globalization in the first place.

== Cyclical theories ==
=== George Modelski ===
George Modelski defines global order as a 'management network centred on a lead unit and contenders for leadership, (pursuing) collective action at the global level'. The system is allegedly cyclical. Each cycle is about 100 years' duration and a new hegemonic power appears each time:

Portugal 1492-1580; in the Age of Discovery

The Netherlands 1580-1688; beginning with the Eighty Years' War, 1579-1588

United Kingdom (1) 1688-1792; beginning with the wars of Louis XVI

United Kingdom (2) 1792-1914; beginning with the French Revolution and Napoleonic wars

The United States 1914 to (predicted) 2030; beginning with World War I and two.

Each cycle has four phases;

1, Global war, which a) involves almost all global powers, b) is 'characteristically naval' c) is caused by a system breakdown, d) is extremely lethal, e) results in a new global leader, capable of tackling global problems. The war is a 'decision process' analogous to a national election. The Thirty Years War, though lasting and destructive, was not a 'global war'

2, World power, which lasts for 'about one generation'. The new incumbent power 'prioritises global problems', mobilises a coalition, is decisive and innovative. Pre-modern communities become dependent on the hegemonic power

3, Delegitimation. This phase can last for 20–27 years; the hegemonic power falters, as rival powers assert new nationalistic policies.

4, Deconcentration. The hegemony's problem-solving capacity declines. It yields to a multipolar order of warring rivals. Pre-modern communities become less dependent. A challenger appears (successively, Spain, France, France, Germany, and the USSR) and a new global war ensues.

The hegemonic nations tend to have: 'insular geography'; a stable, open society; a strong economy; strategic organisation, and strong political parties. By contrast, the 'challenger' nations have: closed systems; absolute rulers; domestic instability; and continental geographic locations.

The long cycle system is repetitive, but also evolutionary. According to Modelski, it originated in about 1493 through a) the decline of Venetian naval power, b) Chinese abandonment of naval exploration, and c) discovery of sea routes to India and the Americas. It has developed in parallel with the growth of the nation-state, political parties, command of the sea, and 'dependency of pre-modern communities'. The system is flawed, lacking in coherence, solidarity, and capacity to address the North-South divide. Modelski speculates that US deconcentration might be replaced by a power based in the 'Pacific rim' or by an explicit coalition of nations, as 'co-operation is urgently required in respect of nuclear weapons'.

Modelski 'dismisses the idea that international relations are anarchic'. His research, influenced by Immanuel Wallerstein, was 'measured in decades... a major achievement' says Peter J. Taylor

=== Joshua S. Goldstein ===
Goldstein in 1988 posited a 'hegemony cycle' of 150 years' duration, the four hegemonic powers since 1494 being;

Hapsburg Spain, 1494-1648; ended by the Thirty Years War, in which Spain itself was the 'challenger'; the Treaty of Westphalia and the beginnings of the nation-state.

the Netherlands, 1648-1815; ended by the challenge from France of the revolutionary and Napoleonic wars, the Treaty of Vienna and introduction of the Congress System

Great Britain, 1815-1945; ended by Germany's challenge in two World Wars, and the postwar settlement, including the World Bank, IMF, GATT, the United Nations and NATO

the United States, since 1945.

Goldstein suggests that US hegemony may 'at an indeterminate time' be challenged and ended by China (the 'best fit'), by western Europe, Japan, or (writing in 1988) the USSR. The situation is unstable due to the continuance of Machiavellian power politics and the deployment of nuclear weapons. The choice lies between 'global cooperation or global suicide'. Thus there may be 'an end to hegemony itself'.

Goldstein speculates that Venetian hegemony, ceded to Spain in 1494, may have begun in 1350

== See also ==
- Anti-globalization movement
- Global citizenship
- Global governance
- Power politics
- Power Politics (Wight book)
- World society
