= The Purpose of American Politics =

1960 book by Hans Morgenthau

- First edition
- Author: Hans Morgenthau
- Language: English
- Genre: Political
- Publisher: Alfred A. Knopf
- Publication date: 1960
- Publication place: American

The Purpose of American Politics is a book published in 1960 by the realist academic and political commentator Hans Morgenthau. In the book, Morgenthau defines the purpose of American politics as "the achievement of freedom".

== Introduction ==
Morgenthau writes that America has become the foundation of the lawful order of the Western world and the "fountainhead of its culture", but that the country is unaware of it. The author contends that the United States historically developed the idea of its "natural purpose" within the boundaries of the North American continent, referring to US intervention in Central America as "expeditions... in the nature of isolated forays, primarily for defensive purposes"; to the annexation of the Philippines as "a temporary aberration," noting also that the arena within which the United States must defend and promote its purpose has now become world-wide.

Early on in the book, Morgenthau introduces the concept of "transcendent purpose" which gives meaning to a nation's foreign policy, continuing on that people look to some nations such as Great Britain, France, the US, China and Russia "for specific contributions to the affairs of man which only they can make," while at the same time they don't look to many other nations in the same way, citing Jordan as an example: "They do not look, for instance, to Jordan, 'a country,' to quote the Manchester Guardian, 'without a purpose or a meaning.'" He then develops the idea that the United States is different from other countries in that other nations develop their purpose after they come into existence but in the case of the United States its purpose actually preceded its existence:

"France became aware of the national purpose and developed a philosophy of it only after it had been achieved, [...] The rule that action precedes reflection in the discovery of the national purpose suffers but one complete exception. The United States is the only nation that has reversed the sequence by reflecting upon its purpose before it had come into existence. The awareness of its purpose was not an afterthought."

Morgenthau then notes that the United States was founded with a particular purpose in mind and that at already the very beginning of its history there appeared two contradictory conceptions of its national purpose: one which limits the purpose of America to the promotion of happiness at home, the other that the very purpose of assuring happiness of the citizens requires strength abroad. The book contains a passing reference to Native Americans as "redskins," whose "threat" to the United States Morgenthau compares to that of the Red Army's to American security:

"The redskins, it is true, threatened the United States more directly than did the Red Army. Yet the threat to the European balance of power, of which the Red Army is the instrument as were the German Armies of the two world wars, is but a more insidious and more deadly threat to American security than were the Indian forays, and it was so understood by America."

== Criticism ==
Noam Chomsky mentioned The Purpose of American Politics during one of his talks criticizing it for a number of things. He cited Morgenthau who calls US intervention in Central America "isolated forays" and blames many critics of US historical record for "committing a fundamental error of logic" by confusing "reality"—which Morgenthau implies is the national purpose as it was intended—with "abuse of reality," namely what actually happened:

"[Morgenthau] then goes on to say that [critics of US historical record are] committing what he calls 'the error of atheism' which has criticized religion on similar grounds. And that's a very astute comment. We should also draw the further conclusion, that in fact, what he and a good deal of academic scholarship is presenting is a kind of religion - the state religion we might call it. That is a set of beliefs that you're just supposed to have if you want to be a civilized and well-behaved person with a good shot at a job. And in fact it is [Chomsky's emphasis] committing the 'error of atheism' to mix up what really happened with the religious doctrine about that to which we are actually committed."

Chomsky also cited Morgenthau's concept of "transcendent purpose" of a nation as a claim that the United States unlike other nations was the only country which "came into existence to realize an already existing purpose."

In a Cambridge University Press online review of the book, Richard Ned Lebow, mentioned that "The Soviet Union is portrayed as unremittingly aggressive and the United States as a beacon to the world," as well as that the plight of African-Americans or women was never mentioned in the work. Lebow concluded his review by saying that The Purpose of American Politics "is not a book that has endured, with good reason. Notably, it fails to develop the links between the theory and practice of foreign policy in convincing ways."
