= Coral Bell School of Asia Pacific Affairs =

University department in Canberra, Australia

- Established: 2009
- Parent institution: Australian National University
- Location: ANU Hedley Bull Centre, HC Coombs Building, Canberra, Australian Capital Territory, Australia; 35.2818°S 149.1201°E
- Website: bellschool.anu.edu.au

The Coral Bell School of Asia Pacific Affairs is a constituent of the College of Asia and the Pacific at the Australian National University. The study of the Pacific was formerly a research focus of the Research School of Pacific (and Asian) Studies, founded in 1946 at the Australian National University. Following a university restructure in 2009, the Research School was amalgamated with the Faculty of Asian Studies and renamed the College of Asia and the Pacific (CAP). The disciplines and units of the college were distributed among four Schools:

- Crawford School of Public Policy
- School of Asia and Pacific Affairs
- School of Regulation and Global Governance
- School of Culture History & Language

In 2015, the School of Asia Pacific Affairs, was renamed Coral Bell School of Asia and Pacific Affairs in honour of Coral Bell, a leading Australian scholar of international politics.

== Publications and outreach ==
During its existence, scholars from the RSPacS and RSPAS produced a large number of books and journal articles as well as various other publications that reported on its work and subjects within its scope. For example, one of the major achievements of the research school was the establishment of the Bulletin of Indonesian Economic Studies by Professor Heinz Arndt in the mid-1960s. Now in publication for over 40 years, the Bulletin has documented the development of the Indonesian economy and is today the leading international journal dealing with the economic development of Indonesia.

Other work on the region included support for the major annual Indonesia Update conference in Canberra where Australian and overseas experts discussed the state of development in Indonesia. The Update conference, which is now organised within the College of Asia and the Pacific, leads to the publication of a conference volume. During the 1980s and 1990s, RSPAS was joint publisher of the conference volume in cooperation with the Institute of Southeast Asian Studies in Singapore.

In 2018, the school signed a memorandum of understanding with the Leverhulme Centre for the Future of Intelligence at the University of Cambridge, to collaborate on research into the risks and opportunities of artificial intelligence.

The number of linked publication series of the staff RSPAS is of considerable size covering its scope – with publications relating to Australian, Pacific, and Asian subjects. However following the change in arrangements in the ANU in 2010, some projects effectively closed down.

Pandanus Books was a publishing arm of RSPAS which produced a range of significant publications relative to south east Asian studies until it was wound down in 2006.

=== Internet ===
A significant presence for the RSPAS on the internet was the RSPAS-based work Asian Studies WWW Monitor supported by Dr T.Matthew Ciolek. The Monitor was established in April 1994 and operated until January 2011. Later, the Pacific Studies WWW Monitor (ISSN 1443-8976) modelled on the Asian Studies monitor was established in April 2000.

=== Conferences ===
Subject areas of the conferences that RSPAS conducted or shared with other bodies were extensive in their coverage of Pacific and Asian areas of interest to Australia, this also subsequently attracted researchers with experience who would go on to work in Australian government agencies or authorities, or otherwise government would co-opt RSPAS staff onto their bodies. Of significance of the government relationship between RSPAS and the government is the title of the doctoral these by van Konkelenberg who wrote about The relationship between the Australian National University's Research School of Pacific Studies and the federal government 1946–1975.

== Collections ==
The various divisions or sections within RSPAS had collections of materials in relation to the study areas that were on a par or complementary with that held by the National Library of Australia

== Coombs Building ==
For much of its history, the Research School of Pacific and Asian Studies was housed in the Coombs Building, a notable architectural icon on the ANU campus. The building, named after leading Australian economist H.C. Coombs, was inaugurated on 11 September 1964. A set of interlinked hexagons –- originally two, with third added later, together with a lecture theatre and extension—the Coombs Building was the hive in which research and teaching were carried out on the Asia-Pacific region.

== Deans of the College of Asia and the Pacific ==
- Professor Andrew MacIntyre, starting in 2008
- Professor Michael Wesley
- Professor Brendan Taylor (Acting) (2016–2018)
- Professor Toni Erskine (2018–current)
