= Scientific Man versus Power Politics =

1946 book by Hans Morgenthau

- First edition
- Author: Hans Morgenthau
- Language: English
- Publisher: University of Chicago Press
- Publication date: 1946
- Publication place: United States

Scientific Man versus Power Politics is a 1946 work by realist academic Hans Morgenthau. The book contains Morgenthau's most systematic exposition of a realist philosophy and a critique of a position he terms 'liberal rationalism'. Morgenthau argues that liberalism's belief in human reason had been shown to be deficient because of the rise of Nazi Germany and that emphasis on science and reason as routes to peace meant that states were losing touch with historic traditions of statecraft. The work marked out Morgenthau as the pre-eminent modern exponent of a Hobbesian view of human nature in international relations scholarship. Despite the contemporary association between (neo)realism and positivism Scientific Man has been considered a critique of attempts to place politics on a 'scientific' footing in works such as Charles Merriam's New Aspects of Politics.

The sociologist Read Bain gave the book a critical review in Social Forces.

== See also ==
- Politics Among Nations
- The Twenty Years' Crisis
