= Power Politics (Wight book) =

1946 and 1959 book by Martin Wight

- Author: Martin Wight
- Publisher: Holmes & Meier
- Publication date: 1978
- Pages: 317
- ISBN: 978-0841903449

Power Politics is a book by international relations scholar Martin Wight, first published in 1946 as a 68-page essay. After 1959 Wight added twelve further chapters. Other works of Wight's were added by his former students, Hedley Bull and Carsten Holbraad, and a combined volume was published in 1978, six years after Wight's death. The book provides an overview of international politics featuring many elements of Realpolitik analysis.

== Religion ==
Wight, a pacifist and devout Christian, was appalled by World War II. He favoured a revival of the biblical term Antichrist to describe recurrent warlike situations in history – Antichrist in this context meaning a "demonic concentration of power" rather than a person. In chapter one he observes that the modern state has become "the ultimate loyalty for which men will fight. The medieval world of 'rights and wrongs' has been replaced by a modern one of 'powers, forces, dynasties and ideas".

== Synopsis ==
Wight begins: "Power politics is a colloquial phrase for international politics." He explains that states exploit power to achieve expansion and dominance; "every dominant power aspires... to become a universal empire." For diplomatic reasons, "dominant powers" are euphemized as "Great Powers ... who wish to monopolise (sic) the right to create international conflict". l Great Powers win and lose their status through violence, and are defined by their ability to wage war; they are decreasing in number, but those remaining are increasing in size.

He argues that war and revolution go together: communism provoked fascist and Nazi responses; and both ideologies were led by "gangsters" seeking to rule the world. To suppose that revolutionary ideologies have now been discarded is to show ignorance of human nature, says Wight.

According to Wight, though states are few in number, they are widely diverse and atypical in character. States are more or less immortal, and are therefore unindictable in law. International law is weak, unclear, decentralized, unpoliced, and therefore unenforceable; there is no sovereign power above states.

Therefore, he concludes "domestically, power is constrained by law; but internationally, law is governed and constrained by the struggle for power ... There is no international society, only "international anarchy". International politics is really "power politics", and the causes of war are inherent therein". And, furthermore, '"diplomacy is a 'European invention imposed on the world,'" which "consists in information, negotiation, and communication, but also, covertly, in espionage, subversion and propaganda".

Later chapters examine alliances, the "balance of power", arms races, disarmament, and the supra-national authority of the League of Nations and the United Nations. Wight concludes that "security" is inseparable from moral behavior and cites William Ewart Gladstone and Franklin Roosevelt as examples of the latter.

== Reputation ==
According to Charles Manning, Hedley Bull, Sir Michael Howard, and Hans Morgenthau Martin Wight is one of the finest international thinkers of the 20th century. M. Nicholson says: "Within the 'English school' of International Relations, the work of Martin Wight is placed in particularly high esteem. More perhaps than anyone else, he is the scholar who did IR as it ought to be done." Reviewing Power Politics, F.P. King calls it a delightful book "to browse through, contemplate, refute and enjoy more than once ... Resplendent history, allusions, wit and reasoning." Ian Hall has written a detailed resumé of Wight's work: The International Thought of Martin Wight, Palgrave Macmillan, 2006.

== See also ==
- Expansionism
- Ideocracy
- International law
- Polarity (international relations)
- Power politics
- Speaking truth to power
- State collapse
