= British Committee on the Theory of International Politics =

The British Committee on the Theory of International Politics was a group of scholars created in 1959 under the chairmanship of the Cambridge historian Herbert Butterfield, with financial aid from the Rockefeller Foundation, that met periodically in Cambridge, Oxford, London and Brighton to discuss the principal problems and a range of aspects of the theory and history of international relations. The Committee developed a study of international society and the nature of world politics, which have had an important impact that continues in the present day.

== Meetings ==
Under the guidance of Herbert Butterfield, Martin Wight, Adam Watson and Hedley Bull, the British Committee on the Theory of International Politics met three times a year for an almost thirty-year period from the 1950s to the 1980s, once or twice in Italy. In 1974 a three days meeting (27-30 September) was held at Villa Serbelloni, Bellagio, in agreement with Rockefeller foundation.

== Publications ==
They produced books, essays, article, and they regularly wrote a series of papers specially conceived for the Committee which provoked lively internal discussions and most of which are still unpublished.

== Selected works ==
- Herbert Butterfield, Martin Wight (eds.), Diplomatic Investigations: Essays in the Theory of International Politics (London: Allen & Unwin, 1966).
- Hedley Bull, Adam Watson (eds.), The Expansion of International Society (Oxford: Clarendon Press, 1984).
- Martin Wight, Systems of States ed. Hedley Bull (Leicester: Leicester University Press, 1977).

== See also ==
- English school of international relations theory
