= New Aspects of Politics =

1925 book by Charles Merriam

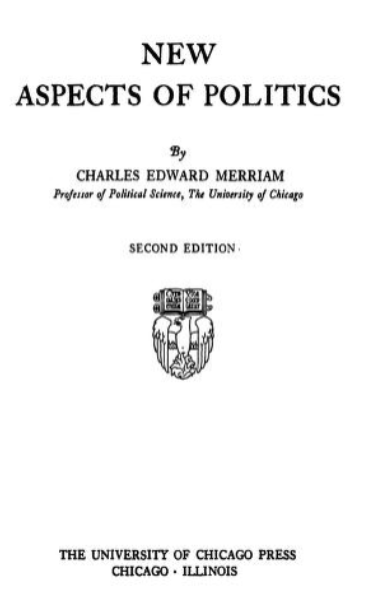
- Title page for New Aspects of Politics (Second Edition)
- Author: Charles Merriam
- Language: English
- Genre: Politics
- Publication date: 1925

New Aspects of Politics is a 1925 book by Charles Merriam. It is considered to be one of the early contributions to the behavioralist movement in political science.
