= Hans Morgenthau =

American political scientist (1904–1980)

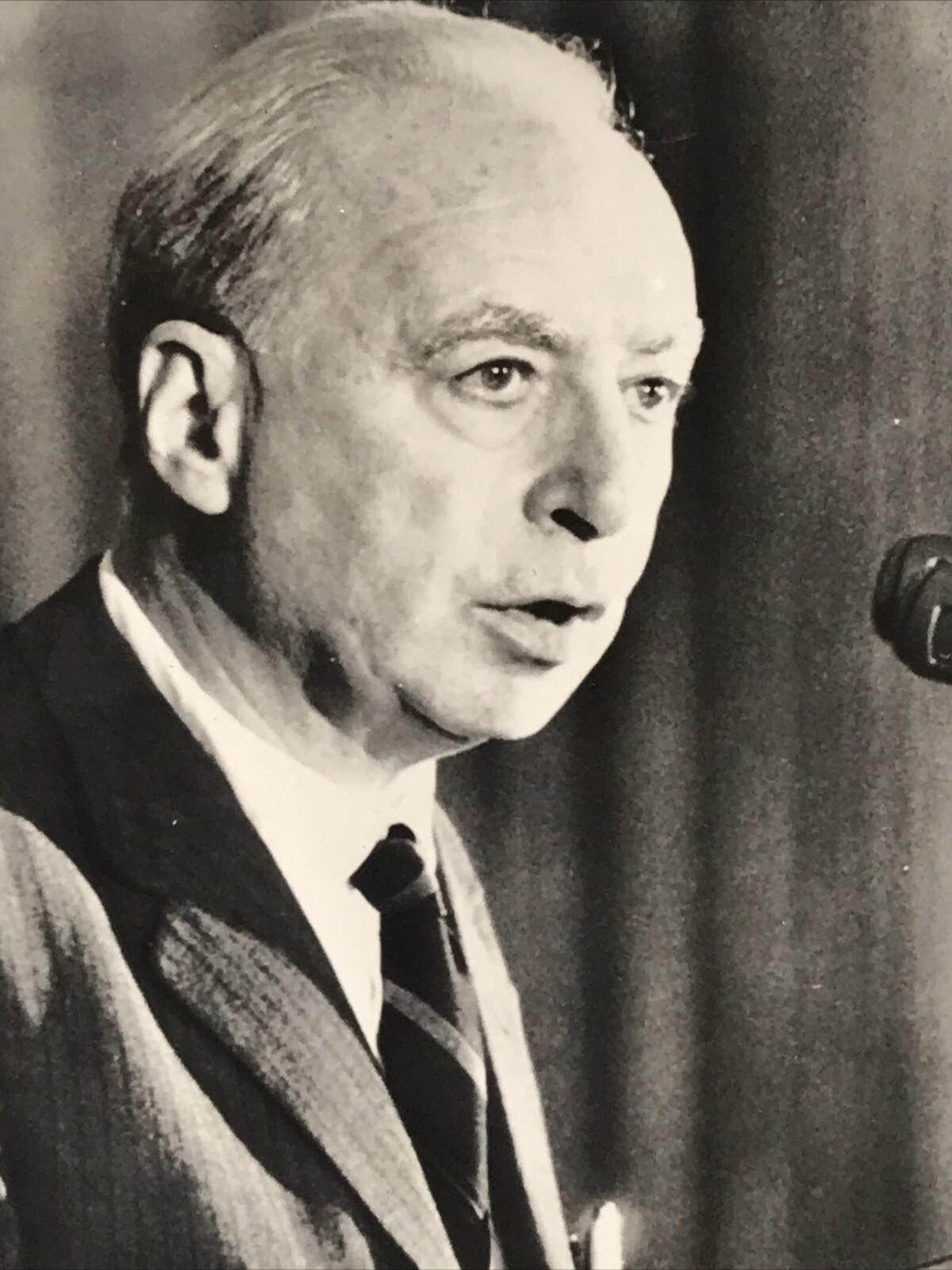
- Morgenthau in 1965
- Born: Hans Joachim Morgenthau; February 17, 1904; Coburg, Saxe-Coburg and Gotha, German Empire (current-day Germany)
- Died: July 19, 1980 (aged 76); New York City, U.S.
- Education: University of Frankfurt am Main, Ludwig-Maximilians-Universität München, Geneva Graduate Institute
- Known for: Classical realism
- Notable work: Politics Among Nations

Hans Joachim Morgenthau (February 17, 1904 – July 19, 1980) was a German-American jurist and political scientist who was one of the major 20th-century figures in the study of international relations. Morgenthau's works belong to the tradition of realism in international relations theory; he is usually considered among the most influential realists of the post-World War II period. Morgenthau made landmark contributions to international relations theory and the study of international law. His Politics Among Nations, first published in 1948, went through five editions during his lifetime and was widely adopted as a textbook in U.S. universities. While Morgenthau emphasized the centrality of power and "the national interest," the subtitle of Politics Among Nations—"the struggle for power and peace"—indicates his concern not only with the struggle for power but also with the ways in which it is limited by ethical and legal norms.

In addition to his books, Morgenthau wrote widely about international politics and U.S. foreign policy for general-circulation publications such as The New Leader, Commentary, Worldview, The New York Review of Books and The New Republic. He knew and corresponded with many of the leading intellectuals and writers of his era, such as Reinhold Niebuhr, George F. Kennan, Carl Schmitt and Hannah Arendt. At one point in the early Cold War, Morgenthau was a consultant to the U.S. Department of State when Kennan headed its Policy Planning Staff, as well as a second time during the Kennedy and Johnson administrations until he was dismissed by Johnson when he began to publicly criticize American policy in Vietnam. For most of his career, however, Morgenthau was esteemed as an academic interpreter of U.S. foreign policy.

== Education, career, and personal life ==
Morgenthau was born in an Ashkenazi Jewish family in Coburg, Saxe-Coburg and Gotha, Germany in 1904. After attending the Casimirianum, he continued his education at the Friedrich Wilhelm University of Berlin, the University of Frankfurt am Main, and the Ludwig-Maximilians-Universität München. He received his doctorate in 1929 with a thesis entitled International Jurisdiction: Its Nature and Limits, and pursued postdoctoral work at the Geneva Graduate Institute, in Switzerland.

He taught and practiced law in Frankfurt before emigrating to the United States in 1937, after several interim years in Switzerland and Spain. One of his first jobs in the U.S. was teaching night school at Brooklyn College. From 1939 to 1943, Morgenthau taught in Kansas City and taught at Keneseth Israel Shalom Congregation there. Morgenthau then was a professor at the University of Chicago until 1973, when he took a professorial chair at the City College of New York. In the early 1950s, Morgenthau was a visiting professor at Harvard, teaching a graduate seminar; at that time he met Henry Kissinger, who was working on his dissertation.

Morgenthau was an elected member of the American Academy of Arts and Sciences and the American Philosophical Society.

On moving to New York, Morgenthau separated from his wife, who remained in Chicago partly because of medical issues. He is reported to have tried to initiate plans to start a new relationship while in New York, with Ethel Person (d. 2012), a psychiatrist at Columbia University.

On October 8, 1979, Morgenthau was one of the passengers on board Swissair Flight 316, which crashed while trying to land at Athens-Ellinikon International Airport. The flight had been destined for Bombay and Peking.

Morgenthau died on July 19, 1980, shortly after being admitted to Lenox Hill Hospital in New York with a perforated ulcer. He is buried in the Chabad section of Montefiore Cemetery, in proximity to the Lubavitcher Rebbe, with whom he had a respectful relationship.

== European years and functional jurisprudence ==
Morgenthau completed his doctoral dissertation in Germany in the late 1920s. It was published in 1929 as his first book, The International Administration of Justice, Its Essence and Its Limits. The book was reviewed by Carl Schmitt, who was then a jurist teaching at the University of Berlin. In an autobiographical essay written near the end of his life, Morgenthau related that, although he had looked forward to meeting Schmitt during a visit to Berlin, the meeting went badly and Morgenthau left thinking that he had been in the presence of (in his own words) "the demonic". By the late 1920s Schmitt was becoming the leading jurist of the rising Nazi movement in Germany, and Morgenthau came to see their positions as irreconcilable. (The editors of Morgenthau's The Concept of the Political [see below] state that "the reader of [Morgenthau's] The Concept of the Political ... will easily recognize that Morgenthau deplored Schmitt's understanding of the political on moral grounds and conceptual grounds.")

Following the completion of his doctoral dissertation, Morgenthau left Germany to complete his Habilitation dissertation (license to teach at universities) in Geneva. It was published in French as La Réalité des normes en particulier des normes du droit international: Fondements d'une théorie des normes (The Reality of Norms and in Particular the Norms of International Law: Foundations of a Theory of Norms). It has not been translated into English. The legal scholar Hans Kelsen, who had just arrived in Geneva as a professor, was an adviser to Morgenthau's dissertation. Kelsen was among the strongest critics of Carl Schmitt. Kelsen and Morgenthau became lifelong colleagues even after both emigrated from Europe to take academic positions in the United States.

In 1933, Morgenthau published a second book in French, La notion du "politique", which was translated into English and published in 2012 as The Concept of the Political. In this book Morgenthau seeks to articulate the difference between legal disputes between nations and political disputes between nations or other litigants. The questions driving the inquiry are: (i) Who holds legal power over the objects or concerns being disputed? (ii) In what manner can the holder of this legal power be changed or held accountable? (iii) How can a dispute, the object of which concerns a legal power, be resolved? and (iv) In what manner will the holder of the legal power be protected in the course of exercising that power? For Morgenthau, the end goal of any legal system in this context is to "ensure justice and peace".

In his work in the 1920s and 1930s, Morgenthau sought a "functional jurisprudence," an alternative to mainstream international law. He borrowed ideas from Sigmund Freud, Max Weber, Roscoe Pound, and others. In 1940 Morgenthau set out a research program for legal functionalism in the article "Positivism, Functionalism, and International Law".

Francis Boyle has written that Morgenthau's post-war writings perhaps contributed to a "break between international political science and international legal studies." However, Politics Among Nations contains a chapter on international law, and Morgenthau remained an active contributor to the subject of the relationship between international politics and international law until the end of his career.

== American years and political realism ==
Hans Morgenthau is considered one of the "founding fathers" of the realist school in the 20th century. This school of thought holds that nation-states are the main actors in international relations and that the main concern of the field is the study of power. Morgenthau emphasized the importance of "the national interest," and in Politics Among Nations he wrote that "the main signpost that helps political realism to find its way through the landscape of international politics is the concept of interest defined in terms of power." Morgenthau is sometimes referred to as a classical realist or modern realist in order to differentiate his approach from the structural realism or neo-realism associated with Kenneth Waltz. Recent scholarly assessments of Morgenthau show that his intellectual trajectory was more complicated than originally thought. His realism was infused with moral considerations—though not always acknowledged as such—and during the last part of his life he favored supranational control of nuclear weapons and strongly opposed the U.S. role in the Vietnam War (see below).

=== Realism and Politics Among Nations (1948) ===
Morgenthau's Scientific Man versus Power Politics (1946) argued against an overreliance on science and technology as solutions to political and social problems. The book presented a "pessimistic view of human nature" centered on a universal lust for power and the inevitability of selfishness. Scientific Man versus Power Politics also argued that, in Robert Jervis's words, "much of modern Liberalism fails to understand the contingent nature of its own knowledge."

Starting with the second edition of Politics Among Nations, Morgenthau included a section in the opening chapter called "Six Principles of Political Realism".

The principles, paraphrased, are:

1. Political realism believes that politics, like society in general, is governed by objective laws that have their roots in human nature.
2. The main signpost of political realism is the concept of interest defined in terms of power, which infuses rational order into the subject matter of politics, and thus makes the theoretical understanding of politics possible. Political realism avoids concerns with the motives and ideology of statesmen. Political realism avoids reinterpreting reality to fit the policy. A good foreign policy minimizes risks and maximizes benefits.
3. Realism recognizes that the determining kind of interest varies depending on the political and cultural context in which foreign policy is made. It does not give "interest defined as power" a meaning that is fixed once and for all.
4. Political realism is aware of the moral significance of political action. It is also aware of the tension between the moral command and the requirements of successful political action. Realism maintains that universal moral principles must be filtered through the concrete circumstances of time and place, because they cannot be applied to the actions of states in their abstract universal formulation.
5. Political realism refuses to identify the moral aspirations of a particular nation with the moral laws that govern the universe.
6. The political realist maintains the autonomy of the political sphere; the statesman asks "How does this policy affect the power and interests of the nation?" Political realism is based on a pluralistic conception of human nature. The political realist must show where the nation's interests differ from the moralistic and legalistic viewpoints.

Morgenthau argued in Politics Among Nations that skillful diplomacy drawing on these principles could lead to stability via the balance of power. He wrote that "the balance of power and policies aiming at its preservation are not only inevitable, but an essential stabilizing factor in a society of sovereign nations." (For further discussion, see section on Criticism, below.)

In practice, however, countries "actively engaged in the struggle for power must actually aim not at a balance -- that is, equality -- of power, but at superiority of power in their own behalf," Morgenthau wrote. The reason is partly that the relative strength of countries can be difficult to calculate, since key elements of national power, such as "the quality of government," are elusive and frequently change. Because "no nation can foresee how large its miscalculations will turn out to be, all nations must ultimately seek the maximum of power obtainable under the circumstances. Only thus can they hope to attain the maximum margin of safety commensurate with the maximum of errors they might commit."

=== Center for the Study of American Foreign and Military Policy ===
In the 1950s, Morgenthau directed the University of Chicago’s Center for the Study of American Foreign and Military Policy. Among other things, he sought to rebuild the center’s resources on “China Studies,” after many experts on the country had been publicly discredited during the Second Red Scare. Morgenthau approached Chinese immigrant and political scientist Tsou Tang to explore the Sino-American relationship using both American and Chinese materials. Morgenthau trusted Tsou, having served on Tsou's committees for his master's and PhD theses. Tsou's 1963 book, America’s Failure in China, 1941-50, drew upon his research at the center.

=== 1955: "Dual state" theory ===
In a 1955 article in the Bulletin of the Atomic Scientists, Morgenthau quoted others speaking about a "dual state" existing in the United States: the democratic façade of elected politicians who operate according to the law, and a hidden national security hierarchy and shadow government that operates to monitor and control the former. This has been said to be the origin of the notion of a deep state in the United States.

=== Dissent on the Vietnam War ===
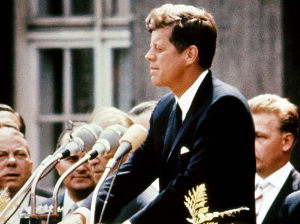
Morgenthau was a consultant for the Kennedy administration from 1961 to 1963

Morgenthau was a strong supporter of the Roosevelt and Truman administrations. When the Eisenhower administration gained the White House, Morgenthau turned his efforts towards a large amount of writing for journals and the press in general. By the time of Kennedy's inauguration in 1961, he had become a consultant to the Kennedy administration. After Johnson became president, Morgenthau became much more vocal in his dissent concerning American participation in the Vietnam War, for which he was dismissed as a consultant to the Johnson administration in 1965. Morgenthau sparred with Johnson's advisors McGeorge Bundy and Walt Rostow. Morgenthau's dissent concerning American involvement in Vietnam, which he viewed mainly as a civil war whose "global significance" was "remote," brought him considerable public and media attention.

On 21 June 1965, Morgenthau debated Bundy live on television under the title Vietnam Dialogue: Mr. Bundy and the Professors with Eric Sevareid as the moderator. During the debate, Bundy accused Morgenthau of being a defeatist and pessimist, citing his 1961 statement that the Pathet Lao were destined to win the Lao civil war, leading Morgenthau to reply: "I may have been dead wrong on Laos, but it doesn't mean I am dead wrong on Vietnam." Bundy then brought up a statement Morgenthau made in 1956, praising President Diem of South Vietnam for creating a "miracle." The American journalist A.J. Langguth wrote that Bundy's point was irrelevant as Diem had been assassinated in 1963, but Bundy made it sound as if Morgenthau was opportunistic and inconsistent. Bundy was generally regarded as having won the debate by viewers at the time.

Morgenthau was a member of the Citizens Committee for a Free Cuba, set up in 1963. In these years Morgenthau continued to write prolifically, publishing a three-volume collection of his essays in 1962.

=== American years after 1965 ===
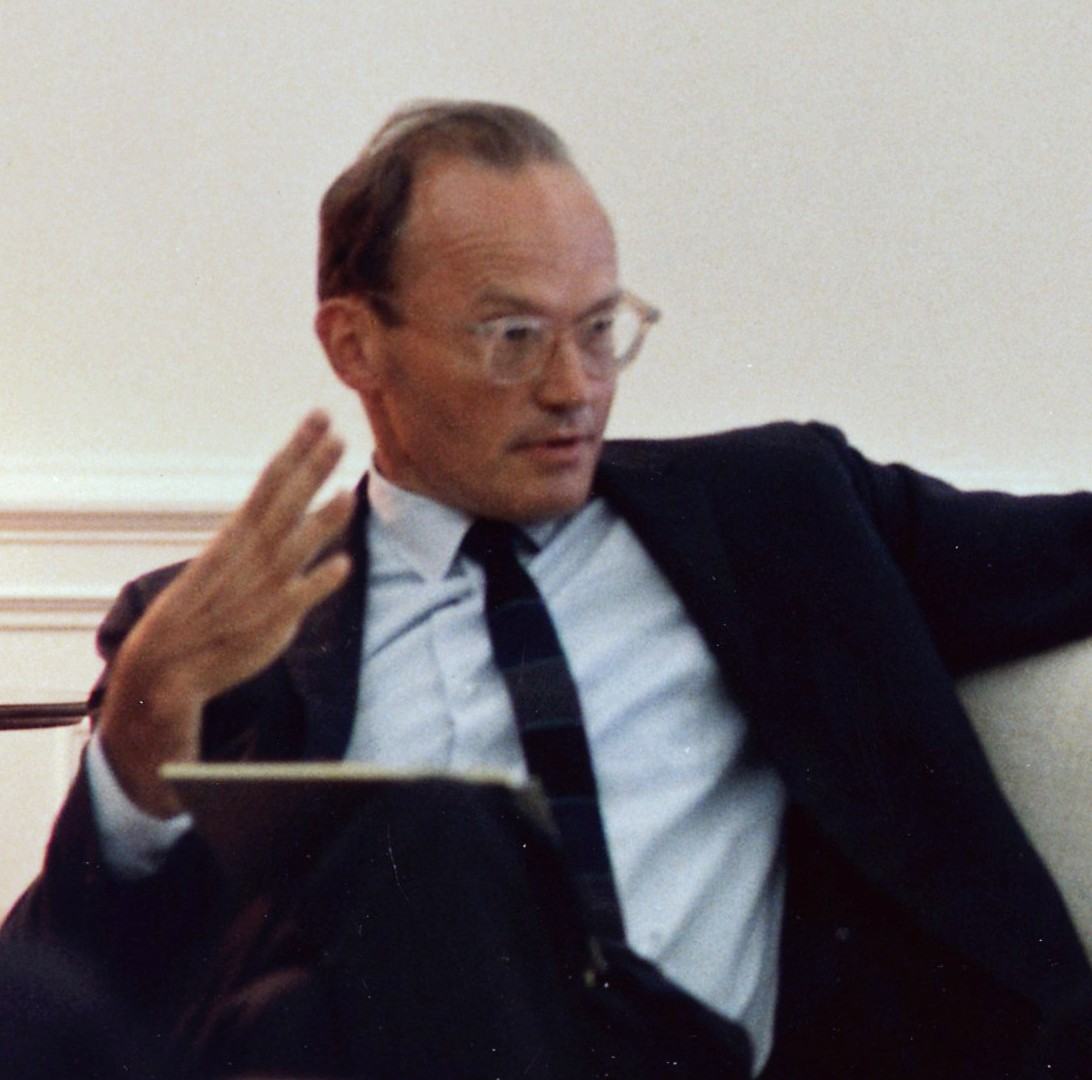
Morgenthau's dissent against Vietnam policy caused the Johnson administration to dismiss him as an advisor and to assign McGeorge Bundy to publicly oppose him in 1965

Starting in 1960, Morgenthau became increasingly concerned with the revolutionary implications of nuclear weapons and the possibility of nuclear war, which he maintained would be a moral calamity of an unprecedented kind. He remarked in the journal Christianity and Crisis that "no such radical qualitative transformation of the structure of international relations has ever occurred in history." While in the 1950s and earlier, Morgenthau had tended to emphasize, in William Scheuerman's words, "the continuities of human history," his recognition of the radical novelty of nuclear weapons led, from the early 1960s onward, to a stress on discontinuity, as represented by the possibility of a civilization-ending nuclear conflict. Morgenthau's views on this issue were influenced by Karl Jaspers' The Future of Mankind, which he reviewed in 1961 for Saturday Review.

After 1965, Morgenthau became a leading voice in the discussion of just war theory in the modern nuclear era. Just war theory was further developed in the work of Paul Ramsey, Michael Walzer, Jeff McMahan, and other scholars.

Morgenthau's book Truth and Power, published in 1970, collected his essays from the previous decade dealing with both foreign policy, including Vietnam, and U.S. domestic politics, e.g. the civil rights movement. Morgenthau dedicated the book to Hans Kelsen, "who has taught us through his example how to speak Truth to Power." Morgenthau's last major book, Science: Servant or Master, was dedicated to his colleague Reinhold Niebuhr and published in 1972.

In summer 1978, Morgenthau wrote his last co-authored essay titled "The Roots of Narcissism," with Ethel Person of Columbia University. This essay was a continuation of Morgenthau's earlier study of this subject in his 1962 essay "Public Affairs: Love and Power," where Morgenthau engaged some of the themes that Niebuhr and the theologian Paul Tillich were addressing. Morgenthau admired Tillich's book Love, Power and Justice, and he wrote a second essay related to the book's themes. More recently, Anthony Lang has recovered and published Morgenthau's extensive course notes on Aristotle (for a course Morgenthau taught while at the New School for Social Research during his New York years). The comparison of Morgenthau to Aristotle has been further explored by Molloy.

Morgenthau was a tireless reviewer of books during the several decades of his career as a scholar in the United States. He wrote nearly a hundred book reviews, including almost three dozen for The New York Review of Books alone. Morgenthau's last two book reviews were not written for The New York Review of Books and were of the books Soviet Perspectives on International Relations, 1956–1967, by William Zimmerman and Work, Society and Culture by Yves Simon. The last book review Morgenthau wrote for The New York Review of Books appeared in 1971. Morgenthau's first book review, written in 1940, was of Law, the State, and the International Community, by James Brown Scott. Morgenthau also commented on the Pentagon Papers.

Like Hannah Arendt, Morgenthau dedicated time and effort to the support of the state of Israel. Both Morgenthau and Arendt made annual trips to Israel to lend their established academic voices to its still young and growing academic community during its inaugural decades as a new nation. Morgenthau's interest in Israel also extended to the Middle East more generally, including the politics of oil. Morgenthau's interest in Israel extended further to related issues of geopolitics, and issues related to Andrei Sakharov and Aleksandr Solzhenitsyn.

Morgenthau remained throughout the Cold War an active participant in the discussion of U.S. foreign policy. He wrote in this connection about Henry Kissinger and his role in the Nixon administration. In a 1975 essay, Morgenthau criticized Kissinger's approach toward internal upheaval in the Third World, arguing that the root of "instability" was not "Communist subversion" but popular dissatisfaction with the status quo. A foreign policy that failed to recognize this could lead to the support of "tyranny," Morgenthau wrote: "[I]n an essentially unstable world, tyranny becomes the last resort of a policy committed to stability in the last resort." Morgenthau in 1977 also wrote a brief "Foreword" on the theme of terrorism as it began to emerge in the 1970s. In addition to addressing current political issues, Morgenthau also wrote about the philosophy of democratic theory when faced with situations of crisis or tension.

== Criticism ==
The reception of Morgenthau's work can be divided into three phases. The first phase occurred during Morgenthau's life up to his death in 1980. The second phase was between 1980 and the one hundred year commemoration of his birth that took place in 2004. The third phase of the reception of his writings is between the centenary commemoration and the present, which shows a vibrant discussion of his continuing influence.

=== Criticism during European years ===
In Morgenthau's early career, the book review of his dissertation by Carl Schmitt had a lasting and negative effect on Morgenthau. Schmitt had become a leading juristic voice for the rising Nazi movement in Germany, and Morgenthau came to see their positions as irreconcilable, although it has been argued that Schmitt and Morgenthau engaged in a "hidden dialogue" in which they influenced each other. Morgenthau subsequently met Hans Kelsen at Geneva while a student, and Kelsen's treatment of Morgenthau's writings left a lifelong positive impression upon the young Morgenthau. Kelsen in the 1920s had emerged as Schmitt's most thorough critic and had earned a reputation as a leading international critic of the then rising National Socialist movement in Germany, which matched Morgenthau's own negative opinion of Nazism.

=== Criticism during American years ===
While Morgenthau's Politics Among Nations had a large influence on a generation of scholars in global politics and international law, Morgenthau's views did not go unchallenged. On the one hand, some critics rejected the basic premises of Morgenthau's realist perspective. On the other hand, some theorists working within a realist framework, such as Kenneth Waltz and John Mearsheimer, took issue with aspects of Morgenthau's approach even while sharing some of his basic assumptions.

In his Theory of International Politics (1979), Kenneth Waltz urged more attention to purely "structural" elements of the international system, especially the distribution of capabilities among states. Waltz's neorealism was more self-consciously scientific than Morgenthau's version of realism. Waltz argued that balances of power recurrently form whether or not states intend that result. Waltz criticized Morgenthau for seeing the maintenance of a balance of power as dependent on states' motives and conscious aims, leading to what Waltz called a "distortion" of balance-of-power theory.

In contrast to Waltz's "defensive" realism, John Mearsheimer presented a theory of "offensive realism" in The Tragedy of Great Power Politics (2001). Mearsheimer agreed with Morgenthau that states seek to maximize their relative power but disagreed about the cause: whereas Morgenthau posited, in Mearsheimer's words, "a will to power inherent in every state," Mearsheimer argued that the "anarchical" character of the international system pushes states to acquire as much power as possible to maximize their chances of survival.

Another area of criticism concerned Morgenthau's treatment of the concept of the national interest. One scholar has suggested that Morgenthau erred in thinking that "the 'rational core of the national interest' can be ascertained by objective analysis." On this account, "the concept of the national interest simply cannot bear the weight Morgenthau assigned to it."

Morgenthau's concept of politics itself has been seen, at least by some writers, as a firmer basis for his position. While Morgenthau viewed politics as a struggle for power, he also viewed it as a struggle conducted by specific means and within certain limits. From this perspective, Morgenthau's distinction between political power and military power represented an effort "to insulate" the properly political realm "from the intrusion of physical violence and domination."

The conceptual distinction between political and military power may not always have influenced Morgenthau's views on specific policy issues, but it probably did so in the case of nuclear weapons. His concern with nuclear weapons and the arms race led to discussions and debates with Henry Kissinger and others. Morgenthau saw many aspects of the nuclear arms race as a form of irrationality requiring the attention of responsible diplomats, statesmen, and scholars. However, Morgenthau's view that a world state would be required to solve the problem of nuclear weapons is in tension with the skepticism about global governance that his realist perspective implies.

=== Criticism of Morgenthau's legacy ===
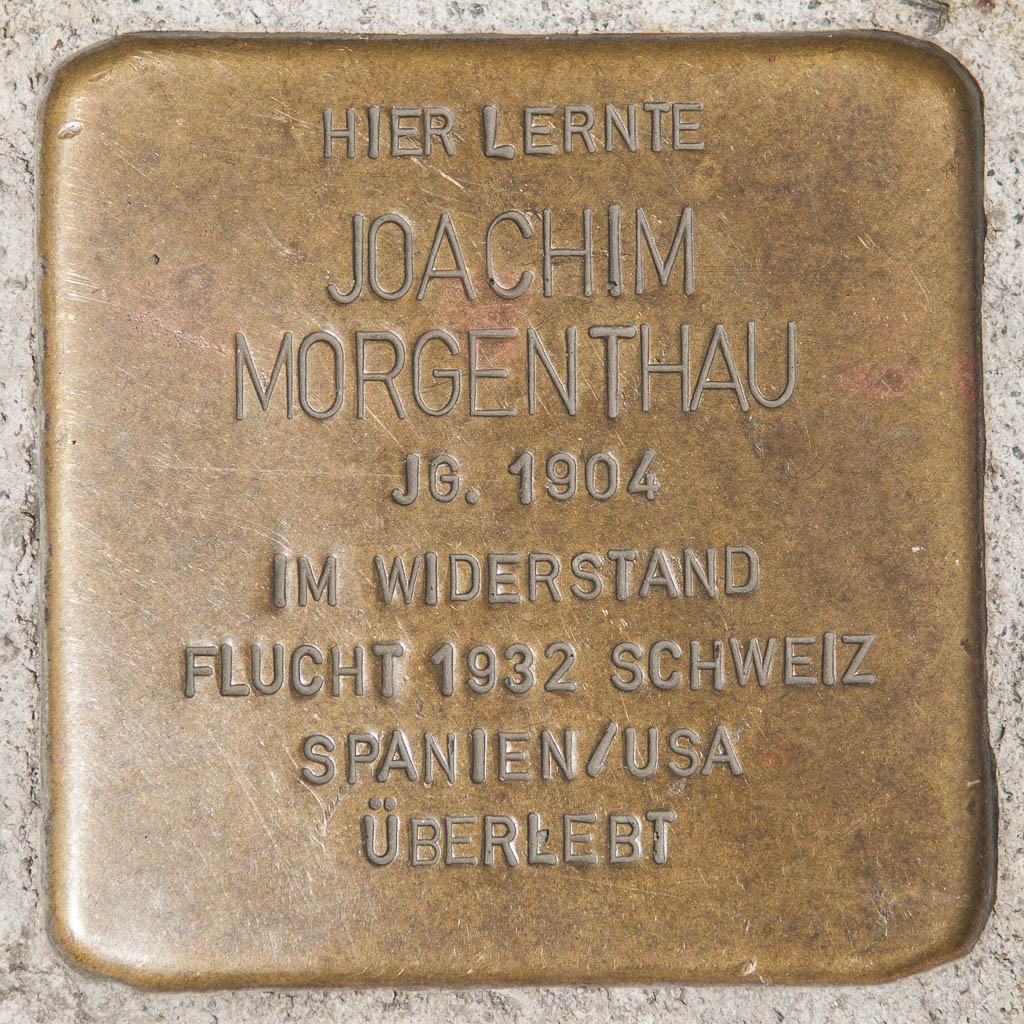
Stolperstein for Hans Morgenthau at the Casimirianum Coburg.

Christoph Frei's intellectual biography of Morgenthau, published in English translation in 2001 (from the earlier German edition) was one of the first of many substantial publications about Morgenthau in the 2000s. Christoph Rohde published a biography of Morgenthau in 2004, still available only in German. Also around 2004, commemorative volumes were published on the occasion of the centenary of Morgenthau's birth.

John Mearsheimer of the University of Chicago has contrasted Morgenthau's political realism to the neo-conservativism prevailing during the Bush administration in the context of the 2003 Iraq War. Morgenthau saw the ethical and moral component of international politics as an integral part of the reasoning process of the international statesman and the essential content of responsible scholarship in international relations. Scholars continue to explore various aspects of Morgenthau's thought, as well as his place in relation to twentieth-century intellectual currents and the disciplinary history of political science and international relations.

== Selected works ==
- Scientific Man versus Power Politics (1946) Chicago, Illinois: University of Chicago Press.
- Politics Among Nations: The Struggle for Power and Peace (1948, and subsequent editions) New York New York Alfred A. Knopf.
- In Defense of the National Interest (1951) New York, New York: Alfred A. Knopf.
- The Purpose of American Politics (1960) New York, New York: Alfred A. Knopf.
- Crossroad Papers: A Look Into the American Future (ed.) (1965) New York, New York: Norton.
- Truth and Power: Essays of a Decade, 1960–70 (1970) New York, New York: Praeger.
- Essays on Lincoln's Faith and Politics. (1983) Lanham, Maryland: Univ. Press of America for the Miller Center of Public Affairs at the University of Virginia. Co-published with a separate text by David Hein.
- The Concept of the Political (2012; original 1933) Intro. by H. Behr and F. Roesch. Translated by M. Vidal. Palgrave Macmillan.

For a complete list of Morgenthau's writings, see "The Hans J. Morgenthau Page" at Google Sites.

== See also ==
- Morgenthau Lectures by the Carnegie Council
- E. H. Carr
- Kenneth W. Thompson
- Stephen Walt
- Committee on International Relations at the University of Chicago

== Notes and further reading ==
Notes

Further reading

- Bain, William. "Deconfusing Morgenthau: Moral Inquiry and Classical Realism Reconsidered." Review of International Studies 26, number 3 (2000): pages 445–64.
- Behr, Hartmut, and Amelia Heath. "Misreading in IR Theory and Ideology Critique: Morgenthau, Waltz and Neo-Realism." Review of International Studies 35 (2009): pages 327–49.
- Bell, Duncan, ed. Political Thought and International Relations: Variations on a Realist Theme. Oxford: Oxford University Press, 2008.
- Bessner, Daniel and Nicolas Guilhot. "How Realism Waltzed Off." International Security, 40 number 2 (2015): pages 87–118.
- Bird, Kai. The Color of Truth: McGeorge Bundy and William Bundy: Brothers in Arms, Simon and Schuster, 2000.
- Buzan, Barry. "The Timeless Wisdom of Realism?," in International Theory: Positivism and Beyond, ed. S. Smith et al. Cambridge University Press, 1996.
- Conces, Rory J. "Rethinking Realism (or Whatever) and the War on Terrorism in a Place Like the Balkans." Theoria 56 (2009): pages 81–124.
- Cozette, Murielle. "Reclaiming the Critical Dimension of Realism: Hans J. Morgenthau on the Ethics of Scholarship." Review of International Studies 34 (2008): pages 5–27.
- Craig, Campbell. Glimmer of a New Leviathan: Total War in the Realism of Niebuhr, Morgenthau, and Waltz. New York: Columbia University Press, 2003.
- Donnelly, Jack. Realism and International Relations. Cambridge: Cambridge University Press, 2000.
- Frei, Christoph. Hans J. Morgenthau: An Intellectual Biography. Baton Rouge: Louisiana State University Press, 2001.
- Gellman, Peter. "Hans J. Morgenthau and the Legacy of Political Realism." Review of International Studies 14 (1988): pages 247–66.
- Goldstein, Gordon. Lessons in Disaster: McGeorge Bundy and the Path to War in Vietnam. Times Books/Henry Holt, 2008.
- Greenberg, Udi. The Weimar Century: German Émigrés and the Ideological Foundations of the Cold War. Princeton University Press, 2014.
- Griffiths, Martin. Realism, Idealism and International Politics. London: Routledge, 1992.
- Guilhot, Nicolas. "The Realist Gambit: Postwar American Political Science and the Birth of IR Theory." International Political Sociology 4, number 2 (2008): pages 281–304.
- Guilhot, Nicolas. After the Enlightenment: Political Realism and International Relations in the Mid-Twentieth Century. Cambridge University Press, 2017.
- Hacke, Christian, Gottfried-Karl Kindermann, and Kai M. Schellhorn, eds. The Heritage, Challenge, and Future of Realism: In Memoriam Hans J. Morgenthau (1904–1980). Göttingen, Germany: V&R unipress, 2005.
- Hoffmann, Stanley. "Hans Morgenthau: The Limits and Influence of 'Realism'." In Janus and Minerva. Boulder, Colorado.: Westview, 1987, pages 70–81.
- Jervis, Robert. "Hans Morgenthau, Realism, and the Scientific Study of International Politics." Social Research 61, number 4 (Winter 1994): pages 853–876.
- Jütersonke, Oliver. "Hans J. Morgenthau on the Limits of Justiciability in International Law." Journal of the History of International Law 8, number 2 (2006): pages 181–211.
- Kane, John. Between Virtue and Power: The Persistent Moral Dilemma of U.S. Foreign Policy, Yale University Press, 2008, chapter 15.
- Kaplan, Robert D. (2012) The Revenge of Geography: What the Maps Tell Us About the Coming Conflicts and the Battle Against Fate. New York: Random House. ISBN 978-1-4000-6983-5
- Karkour, Haro L. "Illiberal and Irrational? Trump and the Challenge of Liberal Modernity in US Foreign Policy," International Relations, published online 1 September 2020.
- Karkour, Haro L. and Dominik Giese."Bringing Morgenthau's Ethics In: Pluralism, Incommensurability, and the Turn from Fragmentation to Dialogue in IR." European Journal of International Relations, published online July 6, 2020.
- Karkour, Haro L. and Felix Rösch. "Toward IR’s 'Fifth Debate': Racial Justice and the National Interest in Classical Realism." International Studies Review 26, number 2 (2024): pages 1-20. DOI: https://doi.org/10.1093/isr/viae030.
- Klusmeyer, Douglas. "Beyond Tragedy: Hannah Arendt and Hans Morgenthau on Responsibility, Evil and Political Ethics." International Studies Review 11, number 2 (2009): pages 332–351.
- Knoll, Erwin and Judith Nies McFadden, eds., War Crimes and the American Conscience. Holt, Rinehart and Winston, 1970 (report of a conference on "War and National Responsibility" in which Morgenthau participated).
- Koskenniemi, Martti. The Gentle Civilizer of Nations: The Rise and Fall of International Law 1870–1960 (Hersch Lauterpacht Memorial Lectures).
- Lang, Anthony F., Jr., ed. Political Theory and International Affairs: Hans J. Morgenthau on Aristotle's The Politics. Westport, CT: Praeger, 2004.
- Lebow, Richard Ned. The Tragic Vision of Politics. Cambridge: Cambridge University Press, 2003.
- Lichtheim, George. "The Politics of Conservative Realism." In The Concept of Ideology and Other Essays, New York: Vintage, 1967, pages 129–150.
- Little, Richard. The Balance of Power in International Relations: Metaphors, Myths and Models. Cambridge: Cambridge University Press, 2007.
- Mazur, G.O., ed. One Hundred Year Commemoration to the Life of Hans Morgenthau. New York: Semenenko, 2004.
- Mazur, G.O., ed. Twenty-Five Year Memorial Commemoration to the Life of Hans Morgenthau. New York: Semenenko Foundation, Andreeff Hall, 12, rue de Montrosier, 92200 Neuilly, Paris, France, 2006.
- Mearsheimer, John J. "Hans Morgenthau and the Iraq War: Realism Versus Neo-Conservatism." openDemocracy.net (2005).
- Mearsheimer, John J. The Tragedy of Great Power Politics, W.W. Norton & Co., 2001; updated edition, 2014.
- Milne, David. America's Rasputin: Walt Rostow and the Vietnam War, Hill & Wang, 2008.
- Mollov, M. Benjamin. Power and Transcendence: Hans J. Morgenthau and the Jewish Experience. Lanham, MD: Rowman and Littlefield, 2002.
- Molloy, Sean. "Aristotle, Epicurus, Morgenthau and the Political Ethics of the Lesser Evil." Journal of International Political Theory 5 (2009): pages 94–112.
- Molloy, Sean. The Hidden History of Realism: A Genealogy of Power Politics. New York: Palgrave, 2006.
- Murray, A. J. H. "The Moral Politics of Hans Morgenthau." The Review of Politics 58, no. 1 (1996): pages 81–107.
- Myers, Robert J. "Hans J. Morgenthau: On Speaking Truth to Power." Society 29, number 2 (1992): pages 65–71.
- Neacsu, Mihaela. Hans J. Morgenthau's Theory of International Relations: Disenchantment and Re-Enchantment. Basingstoke: Palgrave Macmillan, 2009.
- Paz, Reut Yael. "A gateway between a distant god and a cruel world: the contribution of 20th century Jewish German-speaking scholars: Erich Kaufmann, Hans Kelsen, Hersch Lauterpacht and Hans J. Morgenthau to the professionalisation of international law and international relations." PhD dissertation, Bar-Ilan University (Ramat Gan, Israel).
- Peterson, Ulrik. "Breathing Nietzsche's Air: New Reflections on Morgenthau's Concept of Power and Human Nature." Alternatives 24, no. 1 (1999): pages 83–113.
- Pichler, Hans-Karl. "The Godfathers of 'Truth': Max Weber and Carl Schmitt in Morgenthau's Theory of Power Politics." Review of International Studies 24 (1998): pages 185–200.
- Pin-Fat, V. "The Metaphysics of the National Interest and the 'Mysticism' of the Nation-State: Reading Hans J. Morgenthau." Review of International Studies 31, number 2 (2005): pages 217–36.
- Rafshoon, Ellen Glaser. "A Realist's Moral Opposition to War: Hans J. Morgenthau and Vietnam." Peace and Change 26 (2001): pages 55–77.
- Rice, Daniel. Reinhold Niebuhr and His Circle of Influence. Cambridge University Press, 2013.
- Rösch, Felix. "Pouvoir, Puissance, and Politics: Hans Morgenthau's Dualistic Concept of Power?." Review of International Studies 40, number 2 (2013): pages 349–65. DOI: https://doi.org/10.1017/S0260210513000065
- Rösch, Felix. Power, Knowledge, and Dissent in Morgenthau's Worldview. New York: Palgrave Macmillan, 2015.
- Rohde, Christoph. Hans J. Morgenthau und der weltpolitische Realismus: Die Grundlegung einer realistischen Theorie. P. Weidmann und Christoph Rohde von VS Verlag für Sozialwissenschaften (16. Februar 2004)
- Rosenthal, Joel H. Righteous Realists: Political Realism, Responsible Power, and American Culture in the Nuclear Age. Baton Rouge: Louisiana State University Press, 1991.
- Russell, Greg. Hans J. Morgenthau and the Ethics of American Statecraft. Baton Rouge: Louisiana State University Press, 1990.
- Scheuerman, William E. Hans Morgenthau: Realism and Beyond. Cambridge: Polity, 2009.
- Scheuerman, William E. "Realism and the Left: The Case of Hans J. Morgenthau." Review of International Studies 34 (2008): pages 29–51.
- Schlesinger, Arthur M., Jr., "National Interests and Moral Absolutes." In The Cycles of American History (Houghton Mifflin, 1986), pages 69–86.
- Schuett, Robert. "Freudian Roots of Political Realism: The Importance of Sigmund Freud to Hans J. Morgenthau's Theory of International Power Politics." History of the Human Sciences 20, number 4 (2007): pages 53–78.
- Schuett, Robert. Political Realism, Freud, and Human Nature in International Relations: The Resurrection of the Realist Man. New York: Palgrave Macmillan, 2010.
- Shilliam, Robbie. "Morgenthau in Context: German Backwardness, German Intellectuals and the Rise and Fall of a Liberal Project." European Journal of International Relations 13, number 3 (2007): pages 299–327.
- Smith, Michael J. Realist Thought from Weber to Kissinger. Baton Rouge: Louisiana State University Press, 1986.
- Spegele, Roger D. Political Realism in International Theory. Cambridge University Press, 1996.
- Thompson, Kenneth W., and Robert J. Myers, eds. Truth and Tragedy: A Tribute to Hans J. Morgenthau. augmented ed. New Brunswick, New Jersey: Transaction, 1984.
- Tickner, J. Ann. "Hans Morgenthau's Principles of Political Realism: A Feminist Reformulation." Millennium: Journal of International Studies 17, no.3 (1988): pages 429–40.
- Tjalve, Vibeke Schou. Realist Strategies of Republican Peace: Niebuhr, Morgenthau, and the Politics of Patriotic Dissent. New York: Palgrave, 2008.
- Tsou, Tang. America's Failure in China, 1941–50.
- Turner, Stephen, and G.O. Mazur. "Morgenthau as a Weberian Methodologist." European Journal of International Relations 15, number 3 (2009): pages 477–504.
- Walker, R.B.J. "Realism and Change," in Inside/Outside: International Relations as Political Theory (Cambridge U.P., 1993), pages 104–124.
- Waltz, Kenneth N. Theory of International Politics. McGraw-Hill, 1979.
- Williams, Michael C., ed. Realism Reconsidered: The Legacy of Hans Morgenthau in International Relations. Oxford: Oxford University Press, 2007.
- Williams, Michael C. The Realist Tradition and the Limits of International Relations. Cambridge: Cambridge University Press, 2005.
- Williams, Michael C. "Why Ideas Matter in International Relations: Hans Morgenthau, Classical Realism, and the Moral Construction of Power Politics." International Organization 58 (2004): pages 633–65.
- Wong, Benjamin. "Hans Morgenthau's Anti-Machiavellian Machiavellianism." Millennium: Journal of International Studies 29, number 2 (2000): pages 389–409.
- Young-Bruehl, Elisabeth. Hannah Arendt: For Love of the World, Second Edition, Yale University Press, 2004.
- Zambernardi, Lorenzo. I limiti della potenza. Etica e politica nella teoria internazionale di Hans J. Morgenthau. Bologna: Il Mulino, 2010.
- Zambernardi, Lorenzo. "The Impotence of Power: Morgenthau's Critique of American Intervention in Vietnam." Review of International Studies 37 (2011): 1335–1356.
- Zambernardi, Lorenzo."The limits of power: Knowledge, ethics, and foreign policy in Hans J. Morgenthau’s international theory." International Relations 36, number 1 (2022): pages 3–22.
- Zimmer, Louis B. The Vietnam War Debate: Hans J. Morgenthau and the Attempt to Halt the Drift into Disaster. Lexington Books, 2011.
