= George Modelski =

American political scientist

- Born: Jerzy Modelski; January 9, 1926; Poznań
- Died: February 21, 2014 (aged 88); Washington, D. C.
- Occupations: Political scientist, professor

Academic background
- Education: Ph. D. (1955), University of London

George Modelski

George Modelski was professor of political science in the University of Washington. Modelski was a professor there from 1967 to 1995.

Before working at the University of Washington, Modelski was a senior research fellow at the Institute of Advanced Studies at the Australian National University.

Modelski did work on long-term processes in global politics and economics, as well as the world urban macrodynamics and world system evolution. He was a neorealist. In 2012 he was awarded with the Bronze Kondratieff Medal by the International N. D. Kondratieff Foundation.

== Long cycles theory ==
George Modelski devised a cyclical theory of world leadership. Each cycle has a duration of about 100 years and a new hegemonic power appears each time.

=== The five world leaders ===
Portugal 1492–1580; in the Age of Discovery

The Netherlands 1580–1688; beginning with the Eighty Years' War, 1579-1588

United Kingdom (1) 1688–1792; beginning with the wars of Louis XIV

United Kingdom (2) 1792–1914; beginning with the French Revolution and the Napoleonic Wars

The United States 1914 to (predicted) 2030; beginning with World War I and World War II.

=== The four phases of the cycle ===
1, Global War, which a) involves almost all global powers, b) is 'characteristically naval' c) is caused by a system breakdown, d) is extremely lethal, e) results in a new global leader, capable of tackling global problems. The war is a 'decision process' analogous to a national election. The emerging global power typically enjoys a 'good war' with undamaged domestic infrastructure and a booming economy.

The Thirty Years War, though lasting and destructive, was not a 'global war'.

2, World Power, which lasts for 'about one generation'. The new incumbent power 'prioritises global problems', mobilises a coalition, is decisive and innovative. For example, the UK after 1815 acted against the transatlantic slave trade and led the Congress system; the US after 1945 co-founded the UN, the IMF, GATT, and the Bretton Woods system.

Pre-modern communities become dependent on the hegemonic power.

3, Delegitimation. This phase can last for 20–27 years; the hegemonic power falters, as rival powers assert new nationalistic policies.

4, Deconcentration. The hegemony's problem-solving capacity declines. It yields to a multipolar order of warring rivals. Pre-modern communities become less dependent.

=== The role of the 'challenger' ===
In the deconcentration phase a rival state or challenger, isolated and fearing encirclement, appears. Spain challenged Portugal; Louis XIV and France challenged the Netherlands; Napoleon Bonaparte sought to bring down the UK; Germany under Kaiser Wilhelm II and Hitler brought an end to British hegemony for a second time. Writing in 1987, Modelski forecast that the USSR would challenge American power from 2030, in a new global war.

=== Why challengers have failed ===
World leader nations tend to have: 'insular geography' and a strong naval power providing 'global reach'; a stable, open society; a strong economy; strategic organisation, and strong political parties. By contrast, the 'challenger' nations have: closed systems; absolute rulers; domestic instability; continental geographic locations; and weaker naval power.

=== Causes ===
1, Modelski writes, 'a similar more modest process may have occurred in Italy from 1000-1500 which then grew from a regional to a world level'. A similar regional cycle may have been present in China since 1,000, but ended with the death of Cheng Ho in 1435.

2, The cycle is driven by generational change. In the Global War phase of 25–30 years, world order under a hegemon is preferred but unavailable; in the World Power phase, order is both preferred and available; in the 3rd phase, Delegitimation, order is present but unpopular; in phase 4, Deconcentration, order is both unwanted and unavailable, leading to further disputes and a new global war.

=== Origins and evolution ===
According to Modelski, the cycle originated in about 1493 through a) the decline of Venetian naval power, b) Chinese abandonment of naval exploration, and c) discovery of sea routes to India and the Americas. It has developed in parallel with the growth of the nation-state, political parties, command of the sea, and 'dependency of pre-modern communities'. The system is flawed, lacking in coherence or solidarity; it also fails to address the North-South divide.

=== Function ===
Modelski wrote that the cycle is a 'learning process' and a 'motor of modernity', providing leadership on a global scale. The cycle ushers in new waves of innovation in orderly fashion. Awareness of the cycle provides a balanced perspective, and a counter to the widespread belief in global anarchy.

=== Forecasts ===
Modelski speculates that US deconcentration might be replaced by a power based in the 'Pacific rim' or by an explicit coalition of nations, as 'co-operation is urgently required in respect of nuclear weapons'. It is possible for the US to become world leader a second time, as Britain did in the 19th century.

=== Critical response ===
Modelski 'dismisses the idea that international relations are anarchic'. His research, influenced by Immanuel Wallerstein, was 'measured in decades... a major achievement' says Peter J. Taylor

Colin Flint saw several flaws in the argument. It is deterministic, incapable of prediction; 'Portugal's 16th century history does not determine the US's 21st century future.' Modelski took a state-centric view which focused on rich countries and ignored the Global South. Flint also questions whether naval power is still relevant in a time of cruise missiles, satellites and drones.

Chinese leaders reject the idea of hegemony, and use the word as an insult.

Joshua S Goldstein says however that long cycles are not mechanistic or deterministic, but 'evolutionary and dynamic' and therefore do have predictive power.

== Books ==
- Globalization as Evolutionary Process: Modeling Global Change, 2008, co-editor, ISBN 978-0-415-77361-4;
- World Cities -3000 to 2000, 2003, ISBN 0-9676230-1-4;
- Leading Sectors and World Powers: The Coevolution of Global Economics and Politics with William R. Thompson, 1996, ISBN 1-57003-054-5
- World System History: The social science of long-term change, 2000, co-editor, ISBN 0-415-23276-7;
- Documenting Global Leadership1988, co-editor, ISBN 0-333-46495-8;
- Seapower in global politics, 1494-1993, 1988, with William R. Thompson, ISBN 0-333-42925-7;
- Long Cycles in World Politics 1987 ISBN 0-295-96430-8; Japanese edition "Sekai shisutemu no dotai", 1991, ISBN 4-7710-0510-9;
- Exploring Long Cycles, 1987, ISBN 0-931477-98-0;
- North-South Relations, 1983, co-editor, ISBN 0-03-062822-9;
- Transnational Corporations and World Order,1979, editor, ISBN 0-7167-1025-0;
- Multinational Corporations and World Order, 1972, editor, ISBN 0-8039-0317-0
- Principles of world politics 1972, LOC card No. 70-163237;
- A theory of foreign policy 1962, LOC card no.62-12472
- SEATO: Six Studies, editor, 1962.
