= Politics Among Nations =

1948 book by Hans Morgenthau

Politics Among Nations: The Struggle for Power and Peace
- Title page for Politics Among Nations: The Struggle for Power and Peace (1949)
- Author: Hans Morgenthau
- Genre: Non-fiction
- Publication date: 1949

Politics Among Nations: The Struggle for Power and Peace is a political science book by Hans Morgenthau published in 1949. It is considered among the most influential works in international relations on classical realism.

Trained as an international lawyer, the publication of the book culminates a transformation in Morgenthau's intellectual trajectory from focusing on legal theory to focusing on international politics.

The book introduces the concept of political realism, presenting a realist view of power politics. This concept played a major role in the foreign policy of the United States, which made it exercise globe spanning power in the Cold War period. The concept also called for a reconciliation of power politics with the idealistic ethics of earlier American discussions about foreign policy.

John Mearsheimer describes it as among the three most influential realist works of international relations of the 20th century.

It has been criticized for contradictions, ambiguity and vagueness. For example, key concepts "national interest" and "balance of power" are not coherently defined.

== Quotations ==
- "The statesman must think in terms of the national interest, conceived as power among other powers. The popular mind, unaware of the fine distinctions of the statesman's thinking, reasons more often than not in the simple moralistic and legalistic terms of absolute good and absolute evil."
- "Realism maintains that universal moral principles cannot be applied to the actions of states (...). The individual may say for himself: "Let justice be done, even if the world must perish", but the state has no right to say so in the name of those who are in its care. (...) While the individual has a moral right to sacrifice himself in defense of such a moral principle, the state has no right to let its moral disapprobation of the infringement of (that moral principle) get in the way of successful political action, itself inspired by the moral principle of national survival."
