= Classical realism (international relations) =

Theory of international relations

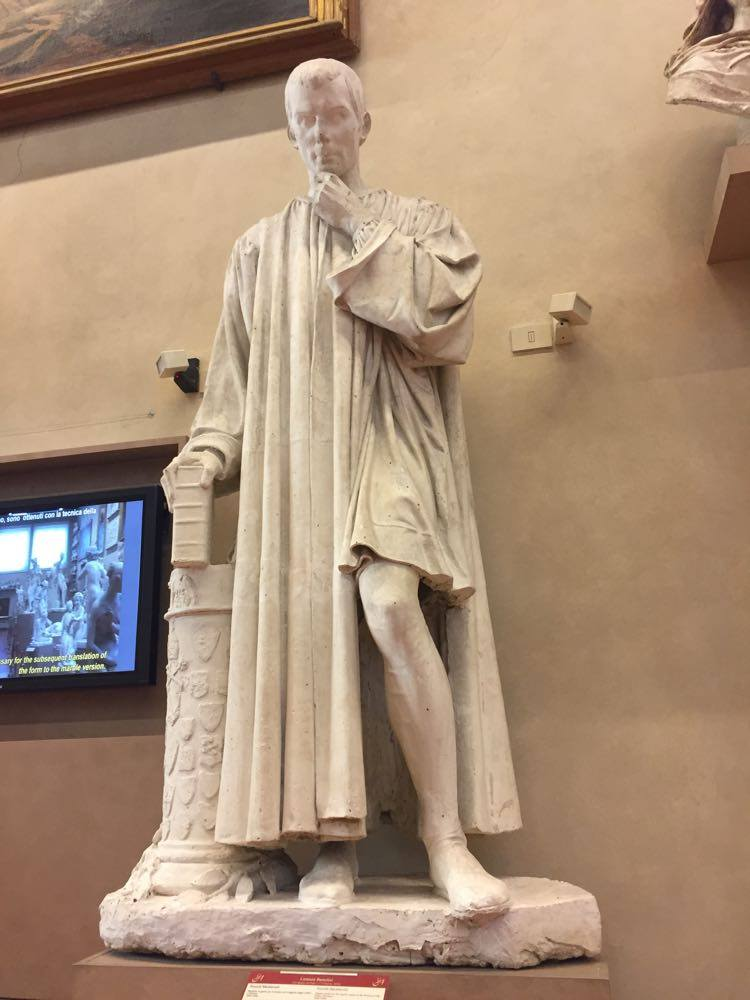
Statue of Niccolò Machiavelli

Classical realism is an international relations theory from the realist school of thought. Realism makes the following assumptions: states are the main actors in the international relations system, there is no supranational international authority, states act in their own self-interest, and states want power for self-preservation. Classical realism differs from other forms of realism in that it places specific emphasis on human nature and domestic politics as the key factor in explaining state behavior and the causes of inter-state conflict. Classical realist theory adopts a pessimistic view of human nature and argues that humans are not inherently benevolent but instead they are self-interested and act out of fear or aggression. Furthermore, it emphasizes that this human nature is reflected by states in international politics due to international anarchy.

Classical realism first arose in its modern form during the interwar period of (1918–1939) as the academic field of international relations began to grow during this era. Classical realism during the inter-war period developed as a response to the prominence of idealist and utopian theories in international relations during the time. Liberal scholars at the time attributed conflict to poor social conditions and political systems whilst, prominent policy makers focused on establishing a respected body of international law and institutions to manage the international system. These ideas were critiqued by realists during the 1930s. After World War II, classical realism became more popular in academic and foreign policy settings. E. H. Carr, George F. Kennan, Hans Morgenthau, Raymond Aron, and Robert Gilpin are central contributors to classical realism.

During the 1960s and 70s classical realist theories declined in popularity and became less prominent as structural realist (neorealist) theorists argued against using human nature as a basis of analysis and instead proposed that explaining inter-state conflict through the anarchic structure of the international system was more empirical. In contrast to neorealism, classical realism argues that the structure of the international system (e.g. anarchy) shapes the kinds of behaviors that states can engage in but does not determine state behavior. In contrast to neorealism, classical realists do not hold that states' main goal is survival. State behavior is ultimately uncertain and contingent.

== Theoretical origins ==
Classical realist writers have drawn from the ideas of earlier political thinkers, most notably, Niccolò Machiavelli, Thomas Hobbes and Thucydides. These political theorists are not considered to be a part of the modern classical realism school of thought, but their writings are considered important to the development of the theory. These thinkers are sometimes evoked to demonstrate the "timelessness" of realist thought; scholars have disputed to what extent these thinkers adhered to realist views.

=== Thucydides ===
Thucydides was an ancient Athenian historian (460BC to 400BC). Thucydides works contains significant parallels with the writings of classical realists. In the Melian Dialogue, Thucydides critiques moralistic arguments made by states by arguing that it is instead self-interest and state power which motivate states and that idealistic arguments disguise this. His writings have been a significant topic for debate in the international relations field. Scholarly interest in Thucydides peaked during the Cold War as International Relations scholars made comparisons between the bi-polarity of the US and Russia and his account of the conflict between Athens and Sparta. Rusten describes Thucydides influence on international relations as "after the Second World War, Thucydides was read by many American opinion-makers (and by those academics who taught them) as a prototypical cold war policy analyst."

=== Niccolo Machiavelli ===
Niccolò Machiavelli was a political theorist and diplomat in the Republic of Florence (1469-1527). His work diverged from the traditions of political theory during his time. In his text The Prince, he argued that a prince may have to diverge from moral conduct in order to survive politically and protect his regime. Machiavelli's view that acquiring a state and maintaining it requires evil means has been seen as one of the more notable aspects of his thought. Machiavelli's writings have been prominent in western political science and this has extended to the international relations field where his writings have been the source of liberal and realist debate.

=== Thomas Hobbes ===
Thomas Hobbes was an English political philosopher (1588-1679). Hobbes' major focus was not on international relations but he influenced classical realist theory through his descriptions of human nature, theories of the state and anarchy and his focus on politics as a contest for power. Hobbes' theory of the "international state of nature" stems from his concept that a world without a government leads to anarchy. This expands upon Hobbes' concept of the "state of nature," which is a hypothetical scenario about how people lived before societies were formed and the role of societies in placing restrictions upon natural rights or freedoms to create order and potential peace. Due to the lack of an international society the international system is therefore understood to be permanently anarchic. Michael Smith describes the significance of this theory to realism as "[Hobbes'] state of nature remains the defining feature of realist thought. His notion of the international state of nature as a state of war is shared by virtually everyone calling himself a realist."

== Assumptions and theories ==
As many of the 20th century figures associated with classical realism were strongly influenced by historians and/or sought to influence policymakers, works in classical realism tended to point to a multiplicity of causes for a wide range of outcomes, as well as cross analytical levels of analysis.

=== Human nature ===
Classical realist theory explains international relations through assumptions about human nature. The theory is pessimistic about human behaviour and emphasizes that individuals are motivated primarily by self-interest and not higher moral or ethical aspirations. The behavior of states is theorized to be dictated by basic primal emotions. For example, Thomas Hobbes described fear or aggression as fundamental motivations. Human nature is not seen to be changeable but controllable only when placed within societal boundaries. Classical realism takes a pessimistic view of human nature, but the exact form this takes is debated, as some classical realists focus on self-interest and a desire for survival as the primary aspects of human nature, whilst others believe in humans’ being inherently cruel, egoistic and savage.

Classical realists believe that their pessimistic vision of human nature is reflected in politics and international relations. Hans Morgenthau in his book Politics Among Nations states that "politics is governed by objective laws that have their roots in human nature." The theory emphasizes that international relations are shaped by the tendencies of human nature since is not changeable but only controllable by a higher power such as the state implementing order. Due to the anarchic international system, which means that there is no central power in the international system, states are unrestrained due to a lack of order and are free to express their human nature as a result.

=== Understanding of the state ===
Classical realist theory views the state as the most significant unit of analysis and understands it to be more ontologically significant than the structure of the international system. Classical realist theory attributes significant agency to state actors and believes that as states change so does the international system. This contrasts neo-realist theory which argues that the structure of the international system is ontologically superior and views states as unitary meaning they are seen as rational actors objectively pursuing their national interest. Classical realists do not view states as unitary and recognise that they are shaped by state to society relationships as well as international norms; due to this conception of the state they do not regard state actions as inherently rational pursuits of the national interest.

When analyzing the international system, classical realists differentiate between revisionist states and status quo states. This means that they attempt to understand which states are striving to create a new international order how this affects the international security and translates into acts of aggression or causes of war. This contrasts neo-realist theory which generally treats states as unitary actors and therefore places less emphasis on differences between states, including whether they are revisonist or status quo powers.

=== State pursuit of power ===
Classical realists explain state conflict and the pursuit of power by suggesting they are result of human nature. It is theorized that within human nature there is a lust for power which drives states to accumulate it where possible. States are not just motivated to pursue power for the sake of security and survival, but may also be motivated by fear, honor, and glory or just pursue power for its own sake.

States are understood to be a reflection of human nature and the anarchic international system is not considered to be the root cause of the pursuit of power but instead a facilitating factor. In regards to explaining states pursuit of power, classical realism is distinct as later theories places less emphasis on assumptions about human nature but instead focuses on the structure of the international system. Neorealist scholars argue that states seek security and explain the pursuit of power as a means of creating security which contrasts classical realist theory.

Modern International relations scholars have noted that classical realists debated about the extent to which the pursuit of power is an inherent biological drive as opposed to power being a method of self-preservation.

=== Balance of power ===
The balance of power is a key analytical tool used by realist theory. There are two key aspects to the balance of power in classical realism: Firstly, a balance of power is understood to be an unintentional result of great power competition which occurs due to a constant pursuit of power by multiple states to dominate others leading to balance. Secondly, the balance of power is also understood as the efforts of states to create an equilibrium through the use of ideational or material forces such as alliances. Realists view a balance of power as desirable as it creates an inability to be dominated by another state and therefore provides security as it is less likely that states will engage in conflict or war that they cannot win.

Realists also theorise that the balance of power leads to the "security dilemma." The security dilemma is the scenario in which one state increases its power in order to defend themselves and create security, but this prompts other states to increase their power leading to a spiralling effect where both sides are drawn into continually increasing their defence capabilities despite not desiring conflict. Classical realists often place a focus on the inevitability of this process due to the focus on a pessimistic understanding of human nature as egotistic leading states to constantly desire power. This contrasts neo-realists who emphasise that the security dilemma is not inevitable but instead often a self-fulfilling prophecy.

=== Hans Morgenthau's "Six Principles of Political Realism" ===
The second edition of Hans Morgenthau's book Politics Among Nations features the section "The Six Principles of Political Realism." The significance of Hans Morgenthau to international relations and classical realism was described by Thompson in 1959 as "much of the literature in international politics is a dialogue, explicit or not, between Morgenthau and his critics." Morgenthau's six principles of political realism (paraphrased) are that: International politics is governed by the laws derived from human nature. Realism analyses power and power allows the pursuit of national interest meaning that the national interest is defined as power. Realism acknowledges the moral significance of political action but recognises the necessity for immorality in successful politics. Political realism does not identify the morals of a particular nation with universal morals.

== Key debates ==
=== Idealism and realism ===
During the 1920s and 1930s the "first great debate" in international relations between realists and idealists occurred. Some modern historians however dispute the claim and instead suggest that this oversimplifies a wider ranging series of discussions. In the interwar period liberalism was the dominant paradigm in international relations theory but this was contested by classical realist theorists. The publication of E. H. Carr's The Twenty Years' Crisis is seen to be central to the arguments of classical realism during this time period. Carr argued against Utopian and Idealist views on international relations as well as the merit and success of the League of Nations. Following World War 2 and the inability for the international relations system to prevent war, many scholars saw this as a victory for realist theory.

=== Neorealism and classical realism ===
During the 1960s and 1970s the "second great debate" of international relations occurred. Following the behavioral revolution scholars began to place a new emphasis on creating a more empirical methodology for analyzing international relations. Neorealist scholars criticized how classical realist scholars had created methodologies which lacked the standards of proof to be considered scientific theories. Classical realists had emphasized human nature as the primary form of explaining the international system; neo-realists emphasized the international structure instead. Kenneth Waltz's Theory of International Politics was a critical text in this debate as it argued that international anarchy was a core element of international politics. After this era classical realist doctrines became less prominent in favor of neo-realism.
