= Martin Wight =

English international relations scholar

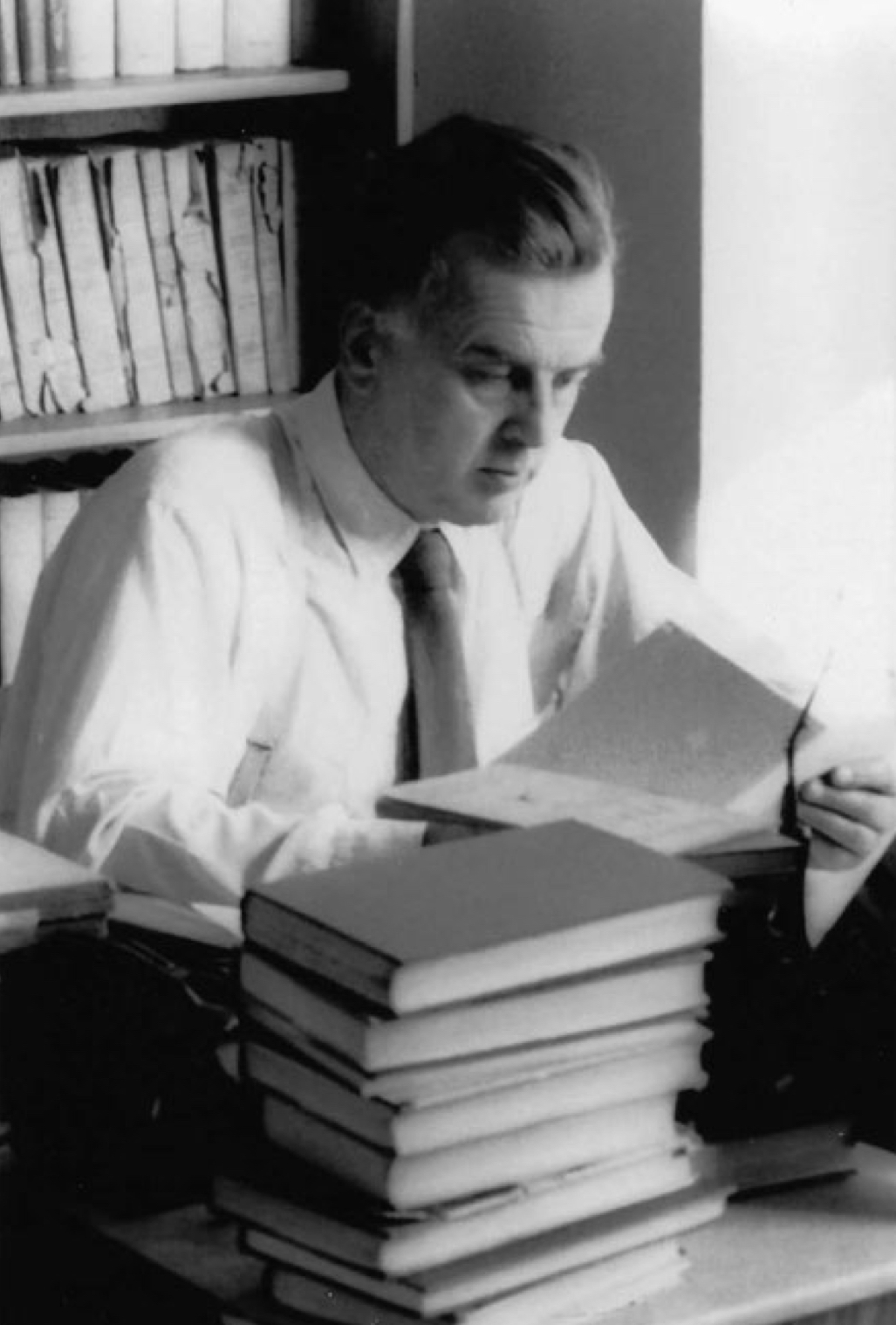
- Wight in 1961
- Born: Robert James Martin Wight; 26 November 1913; Brighton, England
- Died: 15 July 1972 (aged 58); Speldhurst, England
- Spouse: Gabriele Ingeborg Wight

Academic background
- Education: Hertford College, Oxford
- Academic advisors: Herbert Butterfield, Arnold Toynbee
- Influences: Karl Barth; Harold Laski; Dick Sheppard; Arnold J. Toynbee

Academic work
- Discipline: History; political studies
- Sub-discipline: International relations
- School or tradition: Christian pacifism; English school of international relations theory
- Institutions: London School of Economics; University of Sussex Royal Institute for International Affairs
- Notable students: Coral Bell, Hedley Bull
- Notable works: Power Politics (1946); "Why Is There No International Theory?" (1960); Diplomatic Investigations (1966) Systems of States (1977) International Theory (1991)
- Notable ideas: Three traditions in international theory, international society
- Influenced: Hedley Bull

Robert James Martin Wight (26 November 1913 – 15 July 1972) was one of the foremost British scholars of international relations in the twentieth century, and one of the most profound thinkers on international theory of his generation. He was the author of Power Politics (1946; revised and expanded edition 1978), as well as the seminal essay "Why Is There No International Theory?" (first published in the journal International Relations in 1960 and republished in the edited collection Diplomatic Investigations in 1966). He was a teacher of some renown at both the London School of Economics and the University of Sussex, where he served as the founding Dean of European Studies.

Wight is often associated with the British Committee on the Theory of International Politics – "British" to distinguish it from an American body that had been founded under similar auspices – and the so-called English school of international relations theory. His work, along with that of the Australian philosopher John Anderson, was a lasting influence upon the thought of Hedley Bull, author of one of the most widely read texts on the nature of international politics, The Anarchical Society (1977).

== Early life ==
Martin Wight was born on 26 November 1913 in Brighton, Sussex. He attended Bradfield College and in 1931 went to Hertford College, Oxford, to read modern history. He took a first-class honours degree and stayed at Oxford for a short period afterwards engaged in postgraduate research. While at Oxford he became a pacifist, and in 1936 he published a passionate and erudite defence of "Christian Pacifism" in the journal Theology. At about this time he also became involved with the work of Dick Sheppard and his Peace Pledge Union.

In 1937 Wight joined the staff of the Royal Institute of International Affairs (Chatham House). There he worked alongside the Institute's Director of Studies, the historian Arnold J. Toynbee. They had a close intellectual relationship over the decades. In 1938, Wight left Chatham House and took a job as a History Master at Haileybury. Two years later, however, his position at the school became untenable: having been called up for military service, Wight chose to register as a conscientious objector, and one condition of the tribunal's acceptance of his application was that he ceased to teach. At the behest of Margery Perham, he returned to Oxford to work, for the remainder of the Second World War, on an extended research project on colonial constitutions. Wight published three books on this topic: The Development of the Legislative Council (1946), The Gold Coast Legislative Council (1947) and British Colonial Constitutions (1952).

== Post-war years ==
In 1946, Wight was recruited by David Astor, then editor of The Observer to act as the newspaper's diplomatic correspondent at the inaugural sessions of the United Nations at Lake Success. Witnessing at first-hand the early diplomatic wrangles at the UN reinforced his scepticism about the possibility of lasting co-operation between sovereign states – a view reflected in the first edition of his Power Politics (1946, revised edition published posthumously in 1978). In 1947, Wight went back again at Chatham House, collaborating with Toynbee on the production of the Surveys of International Affairs covering the war-years and contributing to his A Study of History. After two years, he was taken on as a Reader in the Department of International Relations at the London School of Economics. There Wight lectured on international organisations and later on international theory, the latter lectures becoming influential in what has become known as the 'English school of international relations'. Ironically, these lectures were first delivered in the United States, at the University of Chicago, where Wight spent a term in 1957. Reconstituted and published in 1990, International Theory: The Three Traditions seeks to make sense of the history of thought about international politics by dividing it into the categories of realism, rationalism and revolutionism, sometimes known as the Machiavellian, Grotian and Kantian traditions.

In 1959, Wight was invited by the Cambridge historian Herbert Butterfield to join the British Committee on the Theory of International Politics, a group initially funded by the Rockefeller Foundation. He presented to that committee his most definitive statements on international theory, notably 'Western Values in International Relations' and an essay on 'The Balance of Power', both subsequently published in Diplomatic Investigations (1966). His contributions to the Committee of the late 1960s and early 1970s were gathered together after his death by Hedley Bull, and published as Systems of States (1977).

In 1960, Wight left the LSE to become the founding Dean of European Studies and Professor of History at the new University of Sussex. There he devoted much of his time to the development of that university's distinctive curriculum, the course in European studies reflecting his conviction that students should learn not just European history, but also the classics, literature and languages.

In the Twenty-first century, some of his published and unpublished texts have been published or reissued by Oxford University Press, including Diplomatic Investigations. Essays on the Theory of International Politics (2019), International Relations and Political Philosophy (2022), Foreign Policy and Security Strategy (2023), History and International Relations (2023), Faith and the Philosophy of History (2025).

== Legacy ==
Wight died, at the age of 58, on 15 July 1972. Only after his death did some of the writings for which he is best known see the light of day. Since the early 1980s – especially after Roy Jones' article "The English School – a Case for Closure" and Michael Nicholson's "The Enigma of Martin Wight" (both in the journal Review of International Studies, 1981) – Wight has come to be seen as a central figure in the so-called "English school of international relations theory". His teaching at the LSE in the 1950s is often seen to have been a strong influence on the direction of international studies in Britain; his posthumously published essays have clearly served as a major stimulus to the revival of the 'English school' in the 1990s.

Michael Nicholson says that in the 'English School' of scholars of international relations, Wight is held in especially high esteem.

A trust fund was set up and the many contributions generously given enabled the annual Martin Wight Prize and the series of Martin Wight Memorial Lectures to be launched. The subject of the annual lecture was to relate so far as possible to humanist scholarship and to reflect the breadth of Martin Wight's interest in history and international relations. Sir Herbert Butterfield gave the first lecture at Sussex University on 23 April 1975, and initially the lectures were given annually. Since 2020, the Martin Wight Memorial Lectures have been given biannually at the LSE. Some recordings or texts of past lectures are available on the Martin Wight Memorial Lectures website at the LSE's Department of International Relations.

== Selected works ==
Wight wrote many reviews, mainly for The Observer and International Affairs, but his main works are as follows:

- "Christian Pacifism", Theology, 33:193 (July 1936), pp. 12–21.
- Letter on "Christian Pacifism", Theology 33:198 (December 1936), pp. 367–368.
- "The Tanaka Memorial", History 27 (March 1943), pp. 61–68.
- Power Politics, Looking Forward Pamphlet, no. 8 (London: Royal Institute of International Affairs, 1946).
- The Development of the Legislative Council 1606–1945, vol. 1 (London: Faber & Faber, 1946).
- "Sarawak", New Statesman and Nation 31, 8 June 1946, pp. 413–414.
- "The Realist’s Utopia", on E. H. Carr, The Twenty Year’s Crisis, The Observer, 21 July 1946, p. 3.
- The Gold Coast Legislative Council (London: Faber & Faber, 1947).
- "The Church, Russia and the West", A Ecumenical Review: a Quarterly, 1:1 (Autumn 1948), pp. 25–45.
- "History and Judgment: Butterfield, Niebuhr and the Technical Historian", The Frontier: A Christian Commentary on the Common Life, 1:8 (August 1950), pp. 301–314.
- With W. Arthur Lewis, Michael Scott & Colin Legum, Attitude to Africa (Harmondsworth: Penguin, 1951).
- Preface & amendments to revised edition of Harold J. Laski, An Introduction to Politics (London: Allen & Unwin, 1951).
- British Colonial Constitutions 1947 (Oxford: Clarendon, 1952) online free to borrow.
- "Spain and Portugal", "Switzerland, The Low Countries, and Scandinavia", "Eastern Europe", "Germany" & "The Balance of Power" in A. J. Toynbee & F. T. Ashton-Gwatkin (eds.) Survey of International Affairs 1939–1946: The World in March 1939 (London: Oxford University Press & Royal Institute of International Affairs, 1952), pp. 138–150, pp. 151–165, pp. 206–292, pp. 293–365 & pp. 508–532.
- Note on A (III) (a) Annex I "Spiritual Achievement and Material Achievement", "The Crux for an Historian brought up in the Christian Tradition" & numerous notes in Arnold J. Toynbee, A Study of History, vol. VII (London: OUP & RIIA, 1954), pp. 711–715 & pp. 737–748.
- "What Makes a Good Historian?", The Listener 53:1355, 17 February 1955, pp. 283–4
- "War and International Politics", The Listener, 54:1389, 13 October 1955, pp. 584–585.
- "The Power Struggle within the United Nations", Proceedings of the Institute of World Affairs, 33rd session (Los Angeles: USC, 1956), pp. 247–259.
- "Brutus in Foreign Policy: The Memoirs of Sir Anthony Eden", International Affairs vol. 36, no. 3 (July 1960), pp. 299–309.
- "Are they Classical", Times Literary Supplement 3171, 7 December 1962, p. 955 & 3176, 11 January 1963, p. 25.
- "The Place of Classics in a New University", Didaskalos: The Journal of the Joint Association of Classical Teachers, 1:1 (1963), pp. 27–36.
- "Does Peace Take Care of Itself", Views 2 (1963), pp. 93–95.
- "European Studies" in D. Daiches (ed.), The Idea of a New University: An Experiment in Sussex (London: Andre Deutsch, 1964), pp. 100–119.
- "Why is there no International Theory?", "Western Values in International Relations" & "The Balance of Power" in Herbert Butterfield & Martin Wight (eds.), Diplomatic Investigations: Essays in the Theory of International Politics (London: Allen & Unwin, 1966), pp. 17–34, pp. 89–131 & pp. 149–175.
- "The Balance of Power and International Order", in Alan James (ed.), The Bases of International Order: Essays in honour of C. A. W. Manning (London: OUP, 1973), pp. 85–115.
- "Arnold Toynbee: An Appreciation", International Affairs 52:1(January 1976), pp. 11–13.
- Systems of States, ed. Hedley Bull (Leicester: Leicester University Press, 1977). online free to borrow
- Power Politics, ed. Hedley Bull & Carstaan Holbraad (Leicester: Leicester University Press for the Royal Institute of International Affairs, 1978).
- "Is the Commonwealth a Non-Hobbesian Institution?", Journal of Commonwealth and Comparative Politics, 26:2 (July 1978), pp. 119–135.
- "An Anatomy of International Thought", Review of International Studies 13 (1987), pp. 221–227.
- International Theory: The Three Traditions ed. Gabriele Wight & Brian Porter (Leicester & London: Leicester University Press, 1991) online free to borrow.
- "On the Abolition of War: Observations on a Memorandum by Walter Millis", in Harry Bauer & Elisabetta Brighi (eds.), International Relations at LSE: A History of 75 Years (London: Millennium Publishing Group, 2003), pp. 51–60.
- Four Seminal Thinkers in International Theory: Machiavelli, Grotius, Kant and Mazzini ed. Gabriele Wight & Brian Porter (Oxford: Oxford University Press, 2005). http://ukcatalogue.oup.com/product/9780199273676.do
- "The Disunity of Mankind", Millennium 44:1 (2015), pp. 129–133.
- "Fortune's Banter", in Michele Chiaruzzi, Martin Wight on Fortune and Irony in Politics (New York: Palgrave Macmillan, 2016), pp. 79–114.
- "Interests of States", in Michele Chiaruzzi, "Interests of States: Un Inedito di Martin Wight", Il Pensiero Politico 51:3 (2018), pp. 427–444.
- International Relations and Political Philosophy, ed. David Yost (Oxford: Oxford University Press, 2022).
- Foreign Policy and Security Strategy, ed. David Yost (Oxford: Oxford University Press, 2023).
- History and International Relations, ed. David Yost (Oxford: Oxford University Press, 2023).
- Faith and the Philosophy of History, ed. David Yost (Oxford: Oxford University Press, 2025).
