= Nottingham Two =

Men arrested in 2008 for suspected terrorist involvement

The Nottingham Two were a student (Rizwaan Sabir) and a staff member (Hicham Yezza) of the University of Nottingham arrested in May 2008 for suspected involvement with Islamic terrorism. The operation was codenamed Operation Minerva. University staff had notified the police after finding an English copy of the so-called Al Qaeda Training Manual on a computer. Both men were released without charge in the following week after it became clear that the document, freely available from US government websites, was used for research about terrorism in the context of a university course, and that neither had any other connection to terrorism. The case was complicated by the fact that one of the two (Hicham Yezza) was re-arrested on immigration charges immediately after the release.

The case resurfaced in May 2011 after a lecturer at the University of Nottingham, Rod Thornton, was suspended for producing a report that seemingly exposed the University of Nottingham for being involved in serious misconduct regarding the arrests and subsequent treatment of both men. Thornton was suspended from his post in spring of 2011 and left his post after "mutual agreement" in the spring of 2012.

Rizwaan Sabir was eventually awarded £20,000 compensation for false imprisonment by Nottinghamshire Police in the civil courts. In July 2012, the case resurfaced after The Observer revealed that police officers "made up" evidence against Rizwaan Sabir. In response to the revelations, an external police force was assigned to investigate West Midlands police. The findings of the investigation are to be published.

== Background ==
Nottingham University's School of Politics and International Relations has been involved in terrorism-related research and higher education, including a taught MA course in "International Security and Terrorism".

== Arrests and release ==
In 2008 Sabir downloaded a 140-page document connected to his research on militant Islam from the US Justice Department website. The document, known as the Al-Qaeda training manual, is also available in book form from Amazon. Sabir was in the process of preparing his forthcoming PhD proposal, and he was being advised and helped by his friend Yezza, who was a member of staff at the university of Nottingham at the time. Sabir often sent Yezza copies of documents and reading materials he was using for his research, and the Al-Qaeda manual was one of them. The document was noticed on Yezza's computer by a colleague and as a result the university authorities notified the police.

On 14 May 2008, Yezza was arrested under Section 41 of the Terrorism Act 2000 on suspicion of being involved in the "commission, preparation or instigation of an act of terrorism". When Sabir tried to support Yezza, he was arrested under the same charge.

The arrest sparked a debate over academic freedom when it was revealed that the document was related to research at the university.

On 20 May 2008, Sabir and Yezza were released without charge. Upon his release, Sabir stated: "the power of the state hit me as hard as it could", and described his experience as "the most degrading, dehumanising encounter [he had] ever experienced". According to reports by Al-Jazeera, Sabir stated he was "subjected to psychological torture" and believed that "If [the UK] is trying to stop the radicalisation of Muslims the way to do that is not by locking away innocent people... That will only exacerbate the problem." Sabir stated that he would continue with his PhD despite the recent events and use his experiences to raise awareness of the draconian anti-terror powers that the government had implemented.

== Immediate aftermath ==
Following the terrorism charges Yezza faced deportation charges. He was issued with a removal order but the plans to deport him before any judicial review could take place were eventually cancelled. In 2009, Yezza was sentenced to nine months' imprisonment for visa irregularities, but was released after five months.

After Sabir was released, Sir Colin Campbell, then vice-chancellor of the university, stated:

There is no 'right' to access and research terrorist materials. Those who do so run the risk of being investigated and prosecuted on terrorism charges. Equally, there is no 'prohibition' on accessing terrorist materials for the purpose of research. Those who do so are likely to be able to offer a defence to charges (although they may be held in custody for some time while the matter is investigated).

The entire incident led to public criticism at the time of Campbell, who appeared unwilling to defend the notion of academic freedom in his response to the arrest.

Due to the arrests, the University of Nottingham came under intense criticism for sacrificing academic freedom and failing to protect the right of its students and staff from conducting research free from the threat of arrest and detention under the Terrorism Act. Criticism for the University of Nottingham was increased when the Politics Department established a "module review committee" that "scrutinises" the "reading lists of lecturers" in case they contain "material that is illegal or could incite violence".

David Miller, professor of sociology at the University of Strathclyde and the convenor of Teaching About Terrorism, said: "Nottingham's review policy represented a fundamental attack on academic freedom. The module review committee is a censorship committee: it can't operate as anything else. The university is acting as the police, one step removed."

Critics argued that the University of Nottingham's stance was setting a very dangerous precedent for research on a topic (terrorism) that is of great contemporary interest and a very popular area of study amongst university students. A lecturer in the school of politics and international relations stated:

We are greatly concerned by the disproportionate nature of the university’s response to the possession of legitimate research materials. Both the individuals are unreservedly innocent and they and their families and friends and have been greatly distressed by the overzealous police investigation. It is crucial that we do not let concerns for security become the enemy of liberty and academic freedom.

== Suspension of lecturer ==
Criticism of the University of Nottingham increased after the only terrorism expert at the institution, Rod Thornton, decided that because of the university's lack of willingness to provide assistance and guidance to him regarding reading lists and terrorist publications and whether they were okay to disseminate and legitimate to hold, he was no longer willing to risk his own security and liberty by teaching the subject of terrorism at Nottingham University. As a result, terrorism is no longer being taught at the University of Nottingham.

For an April 2011 conference of the British International Studies Association (BISA), Thornton prepared a long paper about the behaviour of Nottingham University's management team following the arrests of Yezza and Sabir. In the document, Thornton gave details of what he considered to be the systematic persecution and lies allegedly perpetrated by the management against Yezza, Sabir and junior academics at the university.

One of Thornton's colleagues at Nottingham complained to BISA about the allegedly defamatory content of Thornton's paper, and a spokesman for the university called it "highly defamatory of a number of his colleagues". The paper was removed from BISA's website.

In early May 2011, Thornton was suspended from his duties for the "breakdown in working relationships" caused by the paper. In an open letter published in The Guardian, 67 international researchers including Noam Chomsky asked for Thornton's reinstatement and an independent examination of the university's actions, saying that Thornton's paper "carefully details what appear to be examples of serious misconduct from senior university management over the arrest of two university members".

A campaign calling for the reinstatement of Rod Thornton and for a public inquiry into the University of Nottingham's actions was launched by Thornton's supporters.

Thornton left his post of lecturer in the spring of 2012 by "mutual agreement". Thornton accepted "that the article which he published on the BISA website in April 2011 contained a number of inaccuracies." Thornton apologised for any offence he might have caused.

== Police evidence ==
In July 2012, The Observer revealed that "Documents from the professional standards unit of West Midlands police reveal that officers fabricated key elements of the case against former University of Nottingham student, Rizwaan Sabir". The revelation surfaced after an investigation upheld Rod Thornton's complaint that the Gold Group minutes relating to the investigation invented what he told police about the al-Qaeda training manual which caused the arrests. According to The Observer, "During the [police] interview Thornton said that he merely told police that Sabir was studying al-Qaeda, but was never asked to discuss the manual. Thornton says that officers invented claims that he had concerns over the manual which he says are an apparent attempt to justify the arrest and police anti-terror operation, codenamed Minerva".

The internal police investigation, according to The Observer, "upheld Thornton's claim that officers "made up" what he said about the al-Qaeda manual. [The report] also states that the actual minutes of the Gold Group meeting of the detectives assigned to the case "incorrectly recorded" their conversation with Thornton.

In response, West Midlands Police stated that, in conjunction with the Independent Police Complaints Commission, "officers from another force will now look into how the investigation was carried out by the Professional Standards department [at West Midlands], as well as an additional complaint made separately to Nottinghamshire Police [by Rod Thornton]. Their independent findings will be published".

== Leaked documentation and Unileaks ==
On 12 June 2011, the whistle-blowing website Unileaks.org and the campaign created in support of Rod Thornton, "S.W.A.N", leaked in excess of 200 internal university, police, Special Branch, Home Office and Crown Prosecution Service documents, which they claimed, corroborated the claims made by Thornton that the university undertook a campaign of sabotage against the Nottingham Two before and after their arrest.

Amongst the leaked material contained information and records that the University of Nottingham security staff had been secretly recording protests and keeping a log of Middle East related events, such as talks and seminars.

The University of Nottingham claimed that "no footage of protests was retained or passed to other authorities, including the police or government. He said that security staff kept lists of protests in case extra security was required "because of their subject matter".

Commenting on the Nottingham Case, Shami Chakrabarti, the Director of the Human Rights group Liberty asked the Observer: "Is it right that universities are taking on policing duties?"

On 22 June 2011, the Chair of the British International Studies Association wrote an open letter to the vice-chancellor of the University of Nottingham, Professor David Greenaway, which stated that there was a "strong feeling of unease and concern across [BISA] over the issue of academic freedom raised by, but certainly not confined to, the ongoing case of Dr Rod Thornton". The letter also called for the University of Nottingham to "consider" supporting an independent inquiry into the allegations and issues raised in Thornton's report.

== Media appearances ==
On 27 January 2011, Rizwaan Sabir appeared on 10 O'Clock Live to discuss Terrorism in Britain and the topic of his arrest. He also appeared on various news channels in 2008 as a critic of the governments proposals to increase pre-charge detention for terror suspects from 28 to 42 days.

On 6 June 2011, Rizwaan Sabir and Hicham Yezza appeared on the BBC's Newsnight programme to discuss their arrests and the Conservative government's re-introduction of the 'Preventing violent extremism' strategy.

Hicham Yezza is former editor of the political and cultural Ceasefire Magazine, for which Rizwaan Sabir wrote a bi-weekly column entitled Sabir on Security.

On 6 September 2011, Rizwaan Sabir appeared on the Channel 4 programme, 4Thought TV.

Hicham Yezza and Rizwaan Sabir were interviewed on the TV show, Absent Justice in relation to their case and counter-terrorism in March 2012.

== Legal settlement ==
After his release without charge, Rizwaan Sabir brought legal proceedings against the Chief Constable of Nottinghamshire police for false imprisonment, breaches of the Race Relations Act 1976 and the Human Rights Act 1998. He also claimed under the Data Protection Act 1998 regarding a criminal intelligence file that Nottinghamshire Police held on him, which had an incorrect assertion that he had been convicted of a terrorist offence. This, according to Sabir's lawyers, led him to be subjected to numerous stops and searches.

In September 2011, before the case reached trial, the police agreed to pay Sabir compensation of £20,000 to settle the claims against them, along with all of his legal fees.

In addition to the £20,000 settlement, the Chief Constable, Ms Julia Hodson of Nottinghamshire Police conceded that "there was "no evidence to justify any criminal charge" against Mr Sabir" and agreed to "delete the inaccurate information from the intelligence files; and acknowledged that her officers‟ actions were unlawful and "apologise[d] for any embarrassment, frustration and distress" in respect of a stop and search on 4 February 2010 that was based solely on the fact of his wrongful arrest.

Commenting, Sabir said:

"For more than 3 years, I have been fighting to clear my name and establish that the police were wrong to arrest me and put me through the tortuous experience I suffered at their hands. I have finally succeeded in doing so, and they have been forced to account for the wrong they did to me. But I am one of the lucky ones. I cannot forget all those other innocent people like me who have suffered at the hands of the police but do not have the chance or means to vindicate their names."

Michael Oswald of Bhatt Murphy (London), solicitor for Rizwaan Sabir said:

Mr Sabir’s case is one example of the way in which the War on Terror has been allowed to pervert the rule of law over recent years. Clearly, the police have a difficult and important job to do in their counter terrorism role, however, they must nonetheless act within the law and must be held to account when they do not. Through his remarkable effort and fierce determination over the last three years, Mr Sabir has been able to hold the police to account for their failings. This result is nothing more than the clear vindication to which he is entitled.
