= Rod Thornton =

British soldier and defence studies academic

Academic work
- Main interests: Warfare, Insurgency, Counter-insurgency
- Notable works: Books and articles on counter-insurgency

Rod Thornton is a Senior Lecturer in the Defence Studies Department of King's College London. He previously taught at the University of Kurdistan Hewler in Erbil, Iraq and in the University of Nottingham's department of Politics and International Relations. He was suspended from the University of Nottingham in spring 2011 after publishing an article critical of the University's handling of the arrest of one of its students. He subsequently left the university by "mutual agreement" with the university.

== Military career ==
Rod Thornton served as a staff sergeant in the Green Howards infantry regiment of the British Army, serving in Germany, Derry, West Belfast and Catterick.

== Academic career ==
Rod Thornton began his academic career as a lecturer at the Joint Services Command and Staff College in Shrivenham. After Shrivenham, he went on to become a lecturer at the University of Nottingham's department of Politics and International Relations with research interests in terrorism and counterinsurgency. Thornton is the author of several books on warfare including Asymmetric Warfare: Threat and Response in the 21st Century (Polity Press, 2006) and Dimensions of Counter-Insurgency (Routledge, 2008). His research has appeared in several academic journals including Journal of Strategic Studies and International Peacekeeping. He has given evidence on counter-insurgency to the House of Commons defence committee.

== Terrorism paper controversy ==
In 2011 Thornton was the subject of a controversy over academic freedom when he was suspended from the University of Nottingham after publishing an article critical of the University of Nottingham's handling of the arrest of one of its students on terrorism charges (see Nottingham Two). Thornton's paper – titled "Radicalisation at universities or radicalisation by universities? : How a student's use of a library book became 'a major Islamist plot'" – was submitted for a conference on terrorism held by the British International Studies Association at the University of Manchester. It dealt with the case of Rizwaan Sabir who was arrested after being found in possession of several academic works available from the University library along with a digital copy of the Al-Qaeda Training Manual downloaded onto a University computer from a United States Department of Justice web site. Among the assertions made in the paper is the allegation that Sabir was monitored by senior management and his marks lowered so he could not move on to a PhD. Numerous documents suggested to Thornton a systematic attempt to smear the character of Mr Yezza and Mr Sabir in order to justify the decision to call the police. Pages from the online encyclopedia Wikipedia concerning the case were also altered by individuals within the University. The paper was removed from the BISA website, despite this the 112-page article is freely available to view online. Later BISA published an open letter expressing "a strong feeling of unease and concern" among members over the question of academic freedom raised by Thornton's case and called for an independent inquiry into the affair. In response to the controversy a spokesperson for the University stated that the paper contains "clearly defamatory" material about several members of University staff. Commenting on Thornton's case Cathy James, chief executive of the pro-whistleblowing charity Public Concern at Work, emphasized: "It's really important that whistleblowers are supported." Despite this, senior management at the Nottingham University maintained the suspension of Thornton.

On 15 June the pressure group SWAN (Support the Whistleblower at Nottingham) in association with Unileaks published all of the internal and government documents referred in Thornton's paper. An exclusive was given to The Observer which also asserted that students involved in activities related to the Palestine and the Middle East were being monitored and secretly filmed by the University. Thornton had claimed in his paper that Middle Eastern themed events and protests had been suffered discriminatory treatment despite their peaceful nature. A video subsequently emerged appearing to support this claim, and soon after another surfaced apparently showing security members destroying a Gaza memorial. Thornton's paper also accused the University of being anti-Palestinian, citing the attempt by senior management to host the Israeli Ambassador for a 'public' talk without informing the student population. Later a letter signed by 167 staff, students and alumni appeared in the Observer supporting the claims made by Thornton. They added: "The arrests of two university members, Hicham Yezza and Rizwaan Sabir, in 2008 were not isolated incidents but, in our view, indicate an institutional culture of intolerance within university senior management."

In May 2011, The Guardian newspaper published a letter of support signed by 67 academics from around the world, including Noam Chomsky. This letter called for Thornton's reinstatement and an independent inquiry into his treatment by Nottingham University.

In March 2012 it was announced that Thornton was leaving his job as a lecturer at Nottingham, and that, "for his part, Dr Thornton accepts that the article which he published on the BISA website in April 2011 contained a number of inaccuracies." Thornton apologized for any offence he might have caused.

Subsequently, Rizwaan Sabir completed his PhD and now works as a lecturer at Liverpool John Moores University. In June 2014, at Sabir's request, the University of Nottingham held an inquiry into the marking of his MA dissertation which had led Thornton to write his BISA article. At this inquiry, where Thornton was present, it was found that the marking had, indeed, not followed procedures. Sabir was thus awarded the Merit mark for his MA in 2014 that he had not received in 2009.

== Selected publications ==
- — (2004). "Military organizations and change: The 'professionalization' of the 76th Airborne Division". The Journal of Slavic Military Studies. 17 (3): 449–474. doi:10.1080/13518040490486151. ISSN 1351-8046.
- — (12 February 2007). Asymmetric warfare: Threat and response in the 21st century. Cambridge, UK: Polity Press. ISBN 978-0-7456-3365-7.
- — (2007). "Countering Arab insurgencies: The British experience". Contemporary Security Policy. 28 (1). Taylor & Francis: 7–27. doi:10.1080/13523260701240237. ISSN 1352-3260.
- — (2009). "Afghanistan: A war zone revisited" (PDF). International Studies Review. 11 (2): 389–390. doi:10.1111/j.1468-2486.2009.00863.x.
- — (June 2011). Military modernization and the Russian ground forces (Report). Carlisle, PA: Strategic Studies Institute, US Army War College. ISBN 978-1-58487-492-8. JSTOR resrep11516. OCLC 1109542064. GPO 8770. Republished with modifications as "Military modernization and the Russian ground forces". Current Politics and Economics of Russia, Eastern and Central Europe. 28 (1). Nova Science Publishers: 1–41. 2013. ISSN 1057-2295.
