= Mark Webber (political scientist) =

British political scientist

Professor Mark Alan Webber
- Occupations: Professor of Politics & International Relations

Academic background
- Education: BA Warwick University MA University of Birmingham PhD University of Birmingham

Academic work
- Discipline: Political Scientist
- Sub-discipline: NATO politics and history, foreign policy analysis, security governance, EU defence policy, comparative international organisations, Russian foreign policy, post-Soviet space, China–NATO relations, Western response to Ukraine war.
- Institutions: University of Birmingham

Mark Alan Webber (born 18 April 1964) is a British political scientist and international relations specialist whose research interests include the international politics of the former Soviet Union, contemporary Russian foreign policy, foreign policy analysis (FPA), politics of NATO and European Union enlargement, security studies, comparative international organisations. He is a professor of International Politics at the University of Birmingham, where between 2011 and July 2019 he was the Head of the School of Government and Society. He continues to teach and conduct research as a professor at University of Birmingham.

== Early career ==
Webber was born on 18 April 1964. After completing his BA at Warwick University, and later his MA Social Science at the University of Birmingham, he was awarded his PhD in 1991 for a dissertation on Soviet policy toward southern Africa.

== Academic career ==
During the 1990s, Webber's research concentrated on Russian foreign policy and the Commonwealth of Independent States (CIS). His early publications include The International Politics of Russia and the Successor States (Manchester University Press, 1996), a Chatham House paper CIS Integration Trends: Russia and the former Soviet South (1997), and the edited volume Russia and Europe: Conflict or Cooperation? (Palgrave Macmillan, 2000).

Formerly the Head of the Department of Politics, History and International Relations at Loughborough University, he joined the University of Birmingham, where he later served as Head of the School of Government and Society from 2011 to July 2019. He remains a Professor of International Politics at the university. He has taught undergraduate and postgraduate modules on strategy, leadership, foreign policy, NATO, and global cooperation.

Webber's subsequent research has focused primarily on NATO, European security, and transatlantic relations. He is the author or co-author of several books, including The Enlargement of Europe (1999), Foreign Policy in a Transformed World (2002), Inclusion, Exclusion and the Governance of European Security (2007), NATO's Post-Cold War Trajectory: Decline or Regeneration (2012), and What's Wrong with NATO and How to Fix It (2021). He is also co-editor (with Adrian Hyde-Price) of Theorising NATO: New Perspectives on the Transatlantic Alliance (2016), and co-editor (with James Sperling) of The Oxford Handbook of NATO published in 2025.

His academic articles have appeared in journals including International Affairs, Review of International Studies, Defence Studies, European Journal of International Security, European Security, Journal of European Integration, West European Politics, Global Affairs, International Politics, and European Foreign Affairs Review.

=== Research Interests ===
Webber's research interests include the politics, history, and theoretical interpretation of NATO, Russian foreign policy, foreign policy analysis, security governance, the EU Common Security and Defence Policy, comparative international organisations, and the international politics of the former Soviet Union. He is currently working on projects related to NATO and China, and the Western response to the war in Ukraine.

== Policy and public engagement ==
Webber has lectured at the NATO Fusion Centre (Molesworth), the UK Defence Academy (Shrivenham), and the Royal College of Defence Studies (London). He has given evidence on NATO to the House of Commons Defence Select Committee and the House of Lords Committee on International Relations and Defence.

From 2014 to 2019, he was an External Examiner on the officer commissioning course at the Royal Military Academy, Sandhurst.

Webber has been involved in organising student delegations to the International Model NATO in Washington, D.C. for over fifteen years. Since 2019, he has been academic lead for the London Model NATO, hosted at the UK Foreign, Commonwealth and Development Office and sponsored by the British International Studies Association (BISA). He has also supported Model NATO events with UK embassies in Lithuania, Finland, Portugal, Sweden and Iceland. In 2019, he contributed background video recordings for NATO Engages, the official outreach event of the NATO Leaders’ Meeting in London.

From September 2022 to January 2023, he was the Senior Eisenhower Defence Fellow at the NATO Defence College in Rome.

Webber has been a Trustee of the British International Studies Association (BISA) since 2014 and was the Chair of Board of Trustees of the BISA 2019 to 2023. He is a member of the Royal Institute of International Affairs and sits on the editorial board of European Security. He is also a Fellow of the Academy of Social Sciences (FAcSS).
