= Colin Campbell (legal scholar) =

British lawyer and academic (1944–2022)

Vice-Chancellor of the University of Nottingham
- In office October 1988 – October 2008
- Preceded by: Basil Weedon
- Succeeded by: Sir David Greenaway

Personal details
- Born: 26 December 1944
- Died: 20 May 2022 (aged 77)
- Education: University of Aberdeen

Sir Colin Murray Campbell DL FRSA (26 December 1944 – 20 May 2022) was a British academic lawyer who was vice-chancellor of the University of Nottingham from 1988 to 2008.

== Education and early career ==
Campbell studied law at the University of Aberdeen, graduating with a first-class honours degree. After working at the University of Dundee and the University of Edinburgh, he was appointed professor of jurisprudence at Queen's University of Belfast, where he was dean of the law faculty and a Pro Vice Chancellor.

== Vice-chancellor of the University of Nottingham ==
In 1988, Campbell was appointed to succeed Basil Weedon as vice-chancellor of the University of Nottingham. At 43, he was the youngest university vice-chancellor in the country at the time. Over the next 20 years, he sought to raise the international profile of the university, oversaw the opening of the Jubilee Campus in Nottingham as well as the Ningbo campus in China and the Malaysia campus and greatly expanded both the facilities and student numbers at the university.

In 1994, he helped to establish the Russell Group of public research universities.

Campbell retired in September 2008, after 20 years running the university.

== Other interests ==
Campbell was a member of the Standing Advisory Commission on Human Rights for Northern Ireland, the Legal Aid Advisory Committee and the Mental Health Legislation Review Committee. He also chaired various committees of inquiry in Northern Ireland.

Campbell served on the University Grants Committee as vice-chair of the Committee of Vice-Chancellors and Principals and as a board member of the Higher Education Funding Council for England. He was chair of the Northern Ireland Economic Council from 1987 to 1994, the Human Fertilisation and Embryology Authority from 1990 to 1994, the Human Genetics Advisory Commission from 1996 to 1999 and the Medical Workforce Standing Advisory Committee from 1991 to 2001. He was also a member of the Sheehy Inquiry into police responsibilities and rewards in 1992 and a member of the Trent Regional Health Authority from 1993 to 1996. He chaired the Food Advisory Committee from 1994 to 2001, and in 1999 he was appointed to the board of Swiss Re.

Campbell was also First Commissioner for Judicial Appointments until 2006.

== Legacy ==
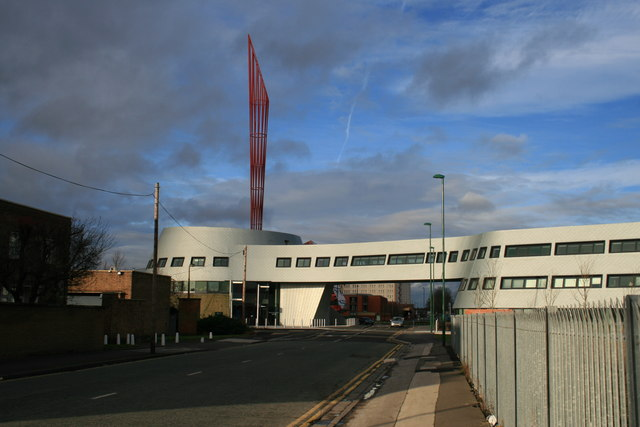
The Colin Campbell Building on the University of Nottingham Jubilee campus.

An influential but controversial figure, Campbell's 20 years in charge of running the University of Nottingham were a pivotal time for the institution. According to one of his successors as vice-chancellor, Shearer West, "he had a vision to grow the university not just through infrastructure, but through student numbers, reputation and by forging new links". The university registrar stated that "so much of the university we know today would not be here without his influence". The university named the Colin Campbell Building at the Jubilee campus in his honour.

Campbell was knighted in 1994 and was made a deputy lieutenant of Nottinghamshire in 1996. He was a Fellow of the Royal Society of Arts and was elected a member of the Academy of Learned Societies for the Social Sciences in 2000. He was awarded the honorary degree of Doctor of Laws by the University of Aberdeen in 2001. In September 2004, he was made an honorary citizen of Ningbo by the Standing Committee of the Ningbo Municipal People's Congress in recognition of his contribution to the construction and development of the Ningbo campus. In April 2006, he received an honorary doctorate of law from Shanghai Jiao Tong University.

=== Criticism ===
In 1999, Campbell caused much comment in the higher education sector by proposing the effective privatisation of universities, saying that what was good for telephone companies, railways and airlines must be good for academia too. He was long-term advocate of controversial plans to introduce tuition fees. He was criticised for the University of Nottingham's decision in 2000 to accept, a £3.8 million endowment from British American Tobacco to establish an international centre for corporate social responsibility at the Nottingham University Business School. Many current and prospective staff at the university felt that the relationship with a tobacco company that had been accused, among other things, of illegal smuggling, trading with the Burmese junta, and illegally targeting its products at African children was highly unethical. This led to resignations, including that of Richard Smith, editor of the British Medical Journal, the loss of at least one grant of £1.5 million from the Cancer Research Campaign and the decision of the director of a gene research group to take his 15-strong team to the University of London.

Further controversy arose in 2008 when Campbell issued a statement in response to the arrests under the Terrorism Act 2000 of a student, Rizwaan Sabir, and a member of staff, Hicham Yezza, at the University of Nottingham. They were held for six days before being released without charge after downloading documents relating to terrorism from a United States government website for research purposes. Appearing to reject the notion of academic freedom, Campbell said in his statement, "There is no 'right' to access and research terrorist materials. Those who do so run the risk of being investigated and prosecuted on terrorism charges. Equally, there is no 'prohibition' on accessing terrorist materials for the purpose of research. Those who do so are likely to be able to offer a defence to charges (although they may be held in custody for some time while the matter is investigated)." Many academic staff at the university found this legal formalism an unacceptable abdication of managerial responsibility, which demonstrated to some that Campbell, to the end, had always been more interested in cutting a figure as a businessman in tune with the establishment zeitgeist than defending and extending academic values.

Rod Thornton asserted that Campbell appeared to have lied in a public statement to Times Higher Education about the case when he claimed that the university had conducted a full risk assessment before reporting the matter to the police. Thornton asserted that this was contradicted by several other sources, including Campbell's own version of events in his account to the Minister for Further and Higher Education. These sources suggested, in Thornton's view, that the university had never carried out such a process.

Shortly before retiring, Campbell received a 90% pay increase, which saw him receive a salary and benefits package worth £585,000. This made him the highest-earning university vice-chancellor in the United Kingdom. Upon his retirement, The Sunday Times called him "The Sir Alex Ferguson of Vice Chancellors".

Academic offices
Preceded by Basil Weedon	Vice-Chancellor of the University of Nottingham; 1988–2008	Succeeded by David Greenaway
