= Basil Weedon =

British chemist and academic (1923–2003)

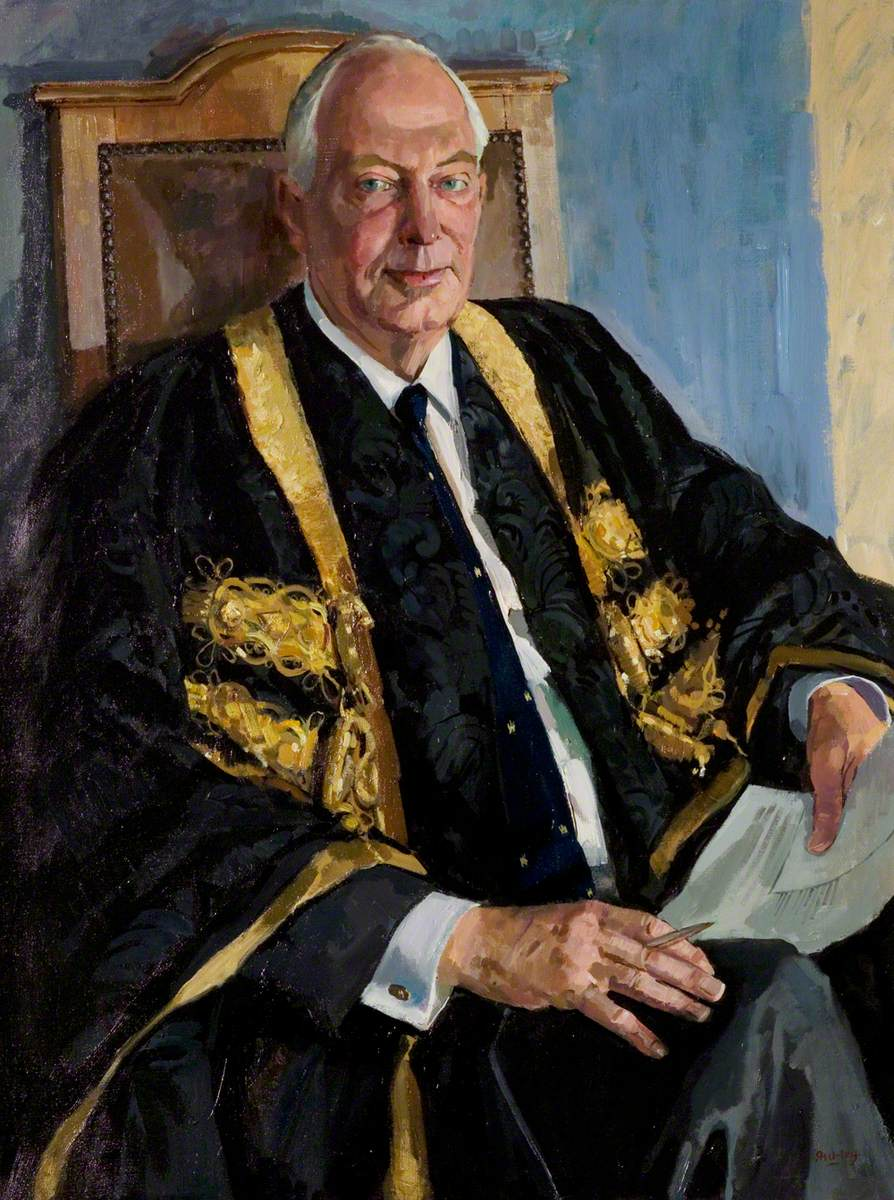
- Oil on canvas painting

Vice-Chancellor of the University of Nottingham
- In office 1976–1988
- Preceded by: John Butterfield
- Succeeded by: Colin Campbell

Personal details
- Born: 18 July 1923 Wimbledon, London
- Died: 10 October 2003 (aged 80)
- Education: Imperial College, London

Professor Basil Charles Leicester Weedon CBE, FRS (18 July 1923 – 10 October 2003) was an organic chemist and university administrator. Using nuclear magnetic resonance spectroscopy, he was the first to map the structures of carotenoid pigments, including astaxanthin, rubixanthin and canthaxanthin.

== Personal life ==
Weedon was born in Wimbledon, his father was a dentist and his mother came from a family of prosperous jewellers. His parents separated when he was nine years old and he remained living with his father, within a few years he had lost all contact with his mother and his younger sister.

During World War II, he was evacuated to a farm near Guildford. His wife, Barbara Dawe, served in the Women's Royal Navy Service during World War II, whilst working there she met Basil's cousin and later Basil. They married in 1959 and had two children, Sarah and Matthew. Weedon suffered from Parkinson's disease in his later years.

== Academic life ==
He attended Wandsworth Grammar School in South London, then a school in Guildford, prior to studying chemistry at Imperial College, London in 1940. He was awarded his degree just two years later, aged 19. He remained at Imperial College, studying for a PhD before taking a job with ICI working on dyes in Blackley, Manchester. He returned to Imperial College in 1947 as a lecturer in organic chemistry and became a reader in 1955. In 1960 he was appointed the Chair of organic chemistry at Queen Mary College. In 1976 he became the 4th Vice-Chancellor of the University of Nottingham, a position he held until his retirement in 1988. He was a consultant to Hoffmann-La Roche, Basel, Switzerland between 1955 and 1978.

== Scientific discoveries ==
Weedon, in collaboration with L. M. Jackman, was the first to use nuclear magnetic resonance spectroscopy to study the structures of carotenoids. He also worked on the synthesis of carotenoids and in 1953 described the synthesis of methylbixin which was produced by exposing bixin from Bixa orellana to iodine; later he successfully synthesised bixin using the Wittig reaction. During the 1960s and 1970s, Weedon's research group elucidated the structures of and synthesised a wide range of naturally occurring carotenoids. These included, canthaxanthin (responsible for the pink colour of flamingos), astaxanthin (responsible for the colour of lobsters), capsanthin and capsorubin (found in red peppers), renieratene (from Japanese sea sponges) and fucoxanthin (the most abundant carotenoid found in seaweed). Other compounds whose structures were discovered include alloxanthin, mytiloxanthin, decaprenoxanthin and violerythrin.

== Honours and awards ==
- 1952 - Meldola Medal of the Royal Institute of Chemistry
- 1971 - Elected a Fellow of the Royal Society
- 1974 - Appointed a Commander of the Order of the British Empire

Academic offices
Preceded by John Butterfield	Vice-Chancellor of the University of Nottingham; 1976– 1988	Succeeded by Colin Campbell
