= David Greenaway (economist) =

British economist

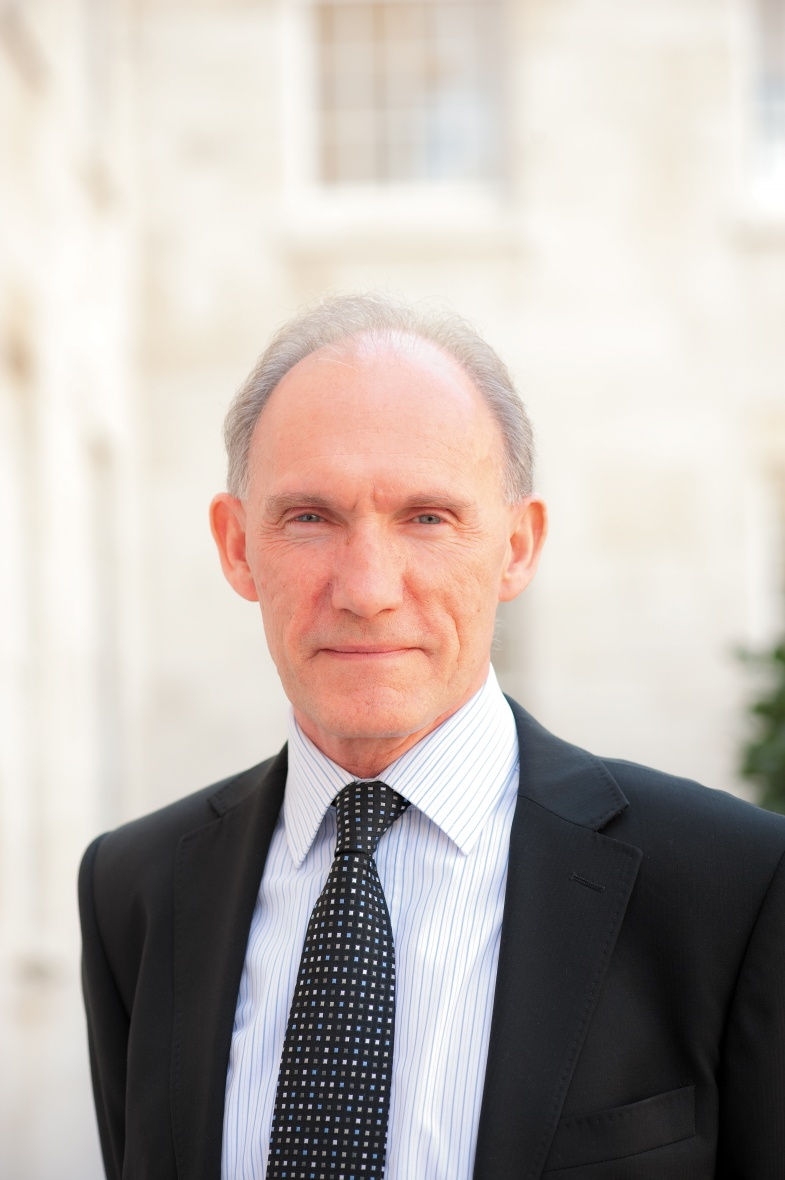

Vice-Chancellor of the University of Nottingham
- In office October 2008 – October 2017
- Preceded by: Sir Colin Campbell
- Succeeded by: Shearer West

Sir David Greenaway DL (born 20 March 1952, Shettleston, Glasgow) is a British economist. He is Emeritus Professor of Economics and was previously the Vice-Chancellor of the University of Nottingham, having succeeded Sir Colin Campbell on 1 October 2008.

== Education and career ==
Greenaway was educated at Shettleston Junior School, Thorntree Primary School and Eastbank Academy (all in Glasgow) then at Henry Mellish Grammar School in Nottingham. After undergraduate and graduate studies at what is now Liverpool John Moores University and the University of Liverpool respectively, he was a lecturer at what is now De Montfort University and later a professor at the University of Buckingham, before joining the University of Nottingham in 1987. From 2004 to 2008 he was a University Pro-Vice-Chancellor, having previously held this position between 1994 and 2001. He was also Dean of the Faculty of Law and Social Sciences between 1991 and 1994; and Chair of the Board of Russell Group Universities (2015–17). He has held visiting positions at: the Claremont Graduate School; Lehigh University; Institut für Weltwirtschaft, Kiel; and Korea University.

Greenaway's research interests are in international trade and economic development, trade and labour market adjustment and cross-border investment. He was the founding Director of the Leverhulme Centre for Research on Globalislation and Economic Policy (GEP) at the University of Nottingham.

Following completion of his tenure as Vice-Chancellor of the University of Nottingham in 2017, Greenaway held a number of other positions including: Member of Council of the University of Cambridge (2017-2022); Member of Council of the National Institute of Economic and Social Research (2018-2022); Member of the International Advisory Board, Shanghai Jiao Tong University (2021-2024); Member of Council of the University of Lincoln (2023-); Member of the Trustee Board, Nottingham Hospitals Charity (2024-).

Greenaway is also a member of the Council of the ESRC; of the Council and Executive of the Royal Economic Society; and of the RAE (now REF) Panels for Economics and Econometrics, and has been a Chair of the RAE panels twice.

He has also participated in advisory work for a number of public institutions. Contributions include:

- Member of the Armed Forces Pay Review Body (1998-2004).
- Chair of the Armed Forces Pay Review Body (2004-2010) which advises the Prime Minister and Secretary of State for Defence annually on the pay and conditions of the UK Armed Forces.
- Member of the Senior Salaries Review Body (2004-2010) which advises the Prime Minister on the remuneration of the senior civil service, judiciary and Government.
- Review of Uninsured Driving for the Secretary of State for Transport (2004) which recommended changes to primary and secondary legislation: https://publications.parliament.uk/pa/cm200304/cmselect/cmtran/105/10507.htm
- Chair of the 'Shape of Training' (2013) Review of the way doctors are trained in the four countries of the UK: https://www.gmc-uk.org/education/standards-guidance-and-curricula/guidance/shape-of-training-review
- Membership of various NHS Boards including the Nottingham Health Authority (1994–98) and Nottingham University Hospitals Board (2000-2004).
- Advisory roles which have included appointments with the World Bank, UNCTAD, UNIDO, European Commission and HM Treasury.

== Honours ==
Greenaway was knighted in the 2014 Birthday Honours for services to higher education.

In 2017 he was conferred with the Malaysian Public Honour of Dato'. He was made an Honorary citizen of Ningbo, China, in 2012 and in 2017 became the 39th Honorary Freeman of Nottingham. He holds Honorary Doctorates from Liverpool John Moores University (2012), University of Liverpool (2016), University of Western Ontario (2017), Glasgow Caledonian University (2019) and University of Nottingham (2019). He was appointed Deputy Lord Lieutenant of Nottinghamshire on 2008.

Academic offices
Preceded by Colin Campbell (academic)	Vice-Chancellor of the University of Nottingham; 1 October 2008 – 30 September 2017	Succeeded by Shearer West
