= John Butterfield =

John Butterfield may refer to:

- John Butterfield (businessman) (1801–1869), American transportation entrepreneur
- Jock Butterfield (1932–2004), full name John Rutherford Butterfield, New Zealand rugby league footballer
- John Butterfield, Baron Butterfield (1920–2000), British medical researcher
