= Academic dress of the University of Nottingham =

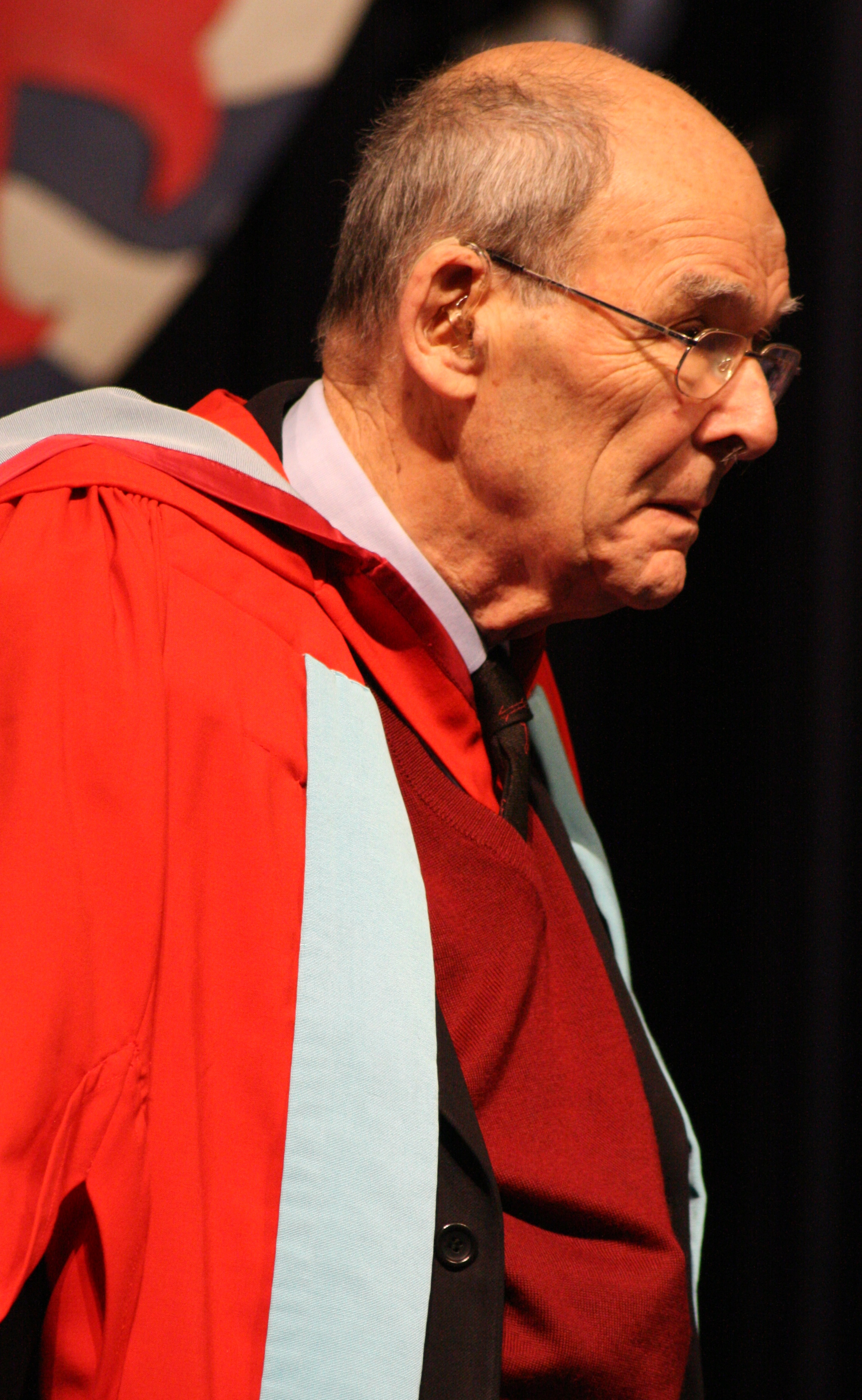
The Australian philosopher David Malet Armstrong receiving an honorary degree in 2007

In general, the academic dress of the University of Nottingham dates from the award of its Royal Charter in 1948. Prior to this date, (the then) University College, Nottingham taught students for University of London examinations and "Nottingham graduates" were actually London graduates and wore the appropriate dress. There was, however, a unique Nottingham undergraduate gown. This still exists but, like equivalent gowns at most other universities, is now very rarely seen.

In addition to the dress listed below, the senior university officers (the chancellor, the pro-chancellors, the treasurer and the vice-chancellor) wear black robes and caps trimmed with gold. Certain other officers (such as the registrar, the chief financial officer and the chief information officer) wear black gowns trimmed with green.

Most gowns and hoods are based on the Cambridge scheme. The main exceptions are that the hood of diplomates is in the Edinburgh shape [f4] and that of certificate-holders in the Belfast shape [f3].

== University Blue ==
The University of Nottingham includes light blue in many items of its academic dress. All degree hoods are lined with light blue, for instance, and the dress robes of all doctors are faced with light blue. Among British universities, light blue is most commonly associated with the University of Cambridge (just as dark blue is with Oxford). The origin of this association of light blue with Nottingham derives from the support the University of Cambridge gave to the newly founded University College Nottingham before the college formally associated itself with London University, resulting in Nottingham adopting many Cambridge academic practices and including 'Cambridge blue' in the design of its academic dress. The first vice-chancellor, Bertrand Hallward was not only a Cambridge graduate, but also a Fellow of Peterhouse and the Senior Proctor for 1934–1935.

== Undergraduate gown ==
The University of Nottingham calendar stated "The gown shall be of black stuff and the pattern shall be full length with open sleeves". Pictures of this gown show that – unusually – the gown was indeed of full length: most undergraduate gowns are of jacket length only.

== Gowns ==
All gowns, other than the dress gowns of doctors, are made from black material. The dress gowns of Doctors of Philosophy and other doctors of this level (such as DBA, DArch and EdD) are made in claret, while those of higher doctors are made from scarlet cloth. For this purpose, the degree of Doctor of Medicine was originally classed as a higher doctorate. In recent years, however, Nottingham Doctors of Medicine have been observed in the claret-coloured gown instead.

The gowns for those holding non-degree awards are either the bachelor's for undergraduate diplomates and undergraduate certificate-holders or master's gown for postgraduate diplomates and postgraduate certificate-holders.

The shape of the gowns follows the Cambridge scheme.

== Hoods ==
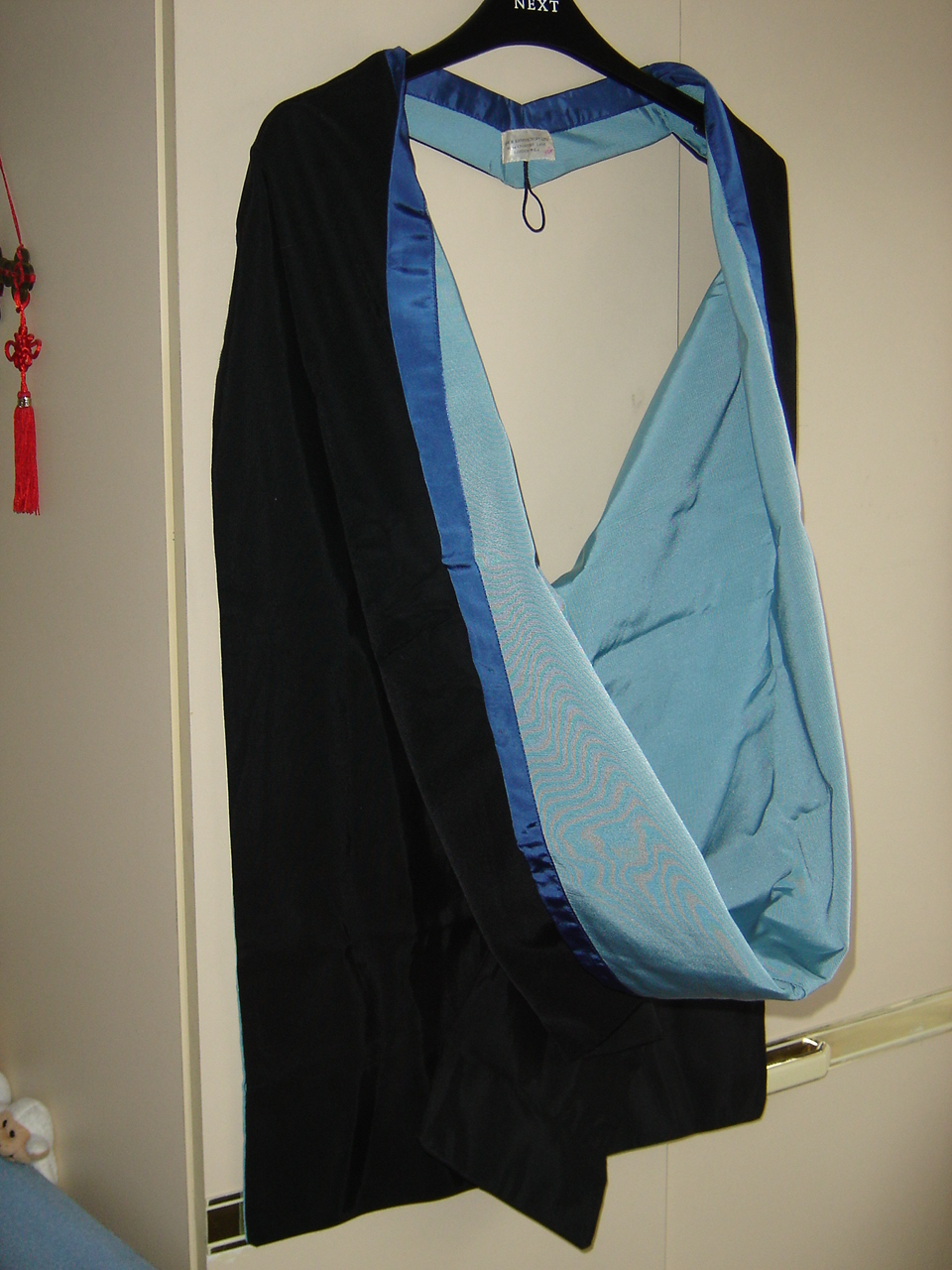
The Nottingham MSc hood

Undergraduate diplomates wear a hood lined with the university blue silk and postgraduate diplomates wear a hood lined with Sherwood green silk. For information regarding hood classifications, see the Groves scheme.

All graduates wear a hood in the full shape. These are either partially or fully lined with light blue silk which is the university colour and trimmed with a ribbon the colour of which indicates the graduate's faculty.

== Headdress ==
All members of the university (from undergraduate to Doctor to Divinity) wear a black square cap except for doctors in full dress for whom the regulations now specify a round black velvet bonnet. Lately, such persons have been observed wearing a cord around the brim of the bonnet though these are not stipulated in the regulations. These cords are claret or scarlet for those with substantive doctorates (depending on the colour of the dress gown) or gold for honorary doctorates.

Degree	Nominal Faculty	Colour of Ribbon
BArch, MArch, DArch	Architecture	orange
BA, MA, MSW, DLitt	Arts and Letters	dark pink
MBA, DBA	Business Administration	Salmon pink
DB, BTh, MTh, DD	Theology	Purple
BEd, MEd, EdD	Education	Lilac
BEng, MEng	Engineering	Navy blue
LLB, LLM, LLD	Law	Maroon
BM, BS, BMedSci, MMedSci, MPH, DM	Medicine, Medical Science & Public Health	Gold
BA, AMusM, AMusD, DMus	Music and Musical Arts	Pink
BN, MN, MNursSci, NursD/DHSci	Nursing and Health Sciences	Cream
BPharm, MPharm,	Pharmacy	Dove grey
BPhil, MPhil, MRes, PhD	Philosophy and Research	Light blue
BSc, MSc, MMath, MSci, MNutr, DAppPsy, DSc	Science (including Mathematics, Nutrition and Applied Psychology)	Royal blue
BVMedSci, BVM, BVS, DVM, DVS	Veterinary Medicine	Teal
