= John Butterfield, Baron Butterfield =

British medical researcher (1920–2000)

The Right Honourable The Lord Butterfield OBE FRCP
- John Butterfield in 1982

Vice-Chancellor, University of Cambridge
- In office 1983–1985
- Preceded by: Harry Hinsley

Master, Downing College, Cambridge
- In office 1976–1983

Member of the House of Lords
- Lord Temporal
- Life peerage 10 August 1988 – 22 July 2000

Personal details
- Born: 28 March 1920
- Died: 22 July 2000 (aged 80)
- Education: University of Oxford; Johns Hopkins University
- Occupation: Administrator
- Profession: Academic, Clinician, Medical researcher

William John Hughes Butterfield, Baron Butterfield (28 March 1920 – 22 July 2000) was a leading British medical researcher, clinician and administrator.

== Early life and education ==
Butterfield was educated at Solihull School, an historic independent school in the West Midlands. Whilst at Solihull he was Head Boy, Head of CCF and captain of rugby, cricket, hockey and athletics. He continued his sporting passions while studying at Oxford, becoming a triple blue. He then benefited from a two-year Rockefeller Foundation Scholar grant to study at Johns Hopkins University, where he gained a further medical degree.

== Career ==
After his degree, national military service awaited him. He spent it as an officer in the Army Physiological Unit and Deputy Director for Scientific Research. He subsequently returned to the United States, to a fellowship at the Medical College of Virginia at Richmond.

Over the years he was appointed to many commissions in the United Kingdom and elsewhere. Among his professional research interests was diabetes mellitus. His appointments included one as Professor of Experimental Medicine at Guy's Hospital. In 1971 he was invited to accept the position of Vice-Chancellor of the University of Nottingham.

In 1976 he was appointed Regius Professor of Physic at the University of Cambridge where he led the re-establishment of the School of Clinical Medicine, University of Cambridge. In 1978 on the death of Sir Morien Morgan he was elected Master of Downing College, Cambridge, where he was a popular figure. Even after retirement from the post, his links with his adopted College persisted and he did what he could to further its interests. The College bar at Downing is named after him. The Mastership of Downing led to a term also as Vice-Chancellor of the University of Cambridge.

== Honours ==
Butterfield was appointed Officer of the Order of the British Empire (OBE) in 1953. In 1978, he was knighted. He was made a life peer in 1988 as Baron Butterfield, of Stechford in the County of West Midlands.

Coat of arms of John Butterfield, Baron Butterfield

Crest
A cubit arm vested Azure semy of pentacles Or the hand Proper holding a pair of keys fesswise the bows interlaced Gold.
Escutcheon
Azure a pale Ermine per fesse counterchanged on a fesse Gules between three lozenges Or a lion passant in trian aspect also Or and between on the dexter a domed tower Proper ensigned by an increscent Argent on the sinister a like tower ensigned by an estoile Gold.
Supporters
Dexter, a greyhound statant erect gorged with an open crown Or; Sinister, a griffin also statant erect Gold.
Motto
Perseverantia

== Footnotes ==
Academic offices
Preceded by Frederick Dainton	Vice-Chancellor of the University of Nottingham; 1971–1975	Succeeded by Basil Weedon
Preceded by Sir Morien Bedford Morgan	Master of Downing College, Cambridge; 1978–1987	Succeeded by Peter Mathias
Preceded by Sir Francis Harry Hinsley	Vice-Chancellor of the University of Cambridge; 1983–1985	Succeeded by Richard Hume Adrian
