= Simone Buitendijk =

Dutch university teacher

Deputy Vice-Chancellor and Provost of the University of Salford
- Incumbent
- Assumed office 2024

Vice-Chancellor of the University of Leeds
- In office September 2020 – December 2023
- Preceded by: Sir Alan Langlands
- Succeeded by: Hai-Sui Yu (interim); Shearer West

Personal details
- Born: The Hague, Netherlands
- Education: Yale School of Medicine; Utrecht University; Leiden University
- Scientific career
- Known for: Women's health
- Workplaces: Leiden University; Netherlands Organisation for Applied Scientific Research; Imperial College London; University of Leeds
- Thesis: Ivf pregnancy : outcome and follow-up (2000)

Simone Elisabeth Buitendijk is a Dutch academic and Deputy Vice-Chancellor and Provost of the University of Salford, England. Until 31 December 2023 she was the vice-chancellor of the University of Leeds. Her research considers women's health and innovations in education.

== Early life and education ==
Buitendijk was born in The Hague. She studied medicine at Utrecht University. She earned a Master of public health at Yale School of Medicine in 1990 where she evaluated the prevalence of medication in early pregnancy and how it related to maternal characteristics. She found that women who use more over-the-counter and prescription drugs are more likely to be white, smoke more than 30 cigarettes a day and smoke marijuana. She joined the Netherlands Organisation for Applied Scientific Research where she worked as a Senior Researcher in perinatal epidemiology. In 2000, she completed her doctorate in epidemiology at Leiden University. Her work considered IVF pregnancies and their follow-up.

== Research and career ==
Buitendijk was appointed Head of the Perinatal Epidemiology section at the Netherlands Organisation for Applied Scientific Research. She worked on fetal and infant health, and the ability of the European Union to produce indicators to assess perinatal health. She was appointed Professor of Preventive Healthcare for Children at the Leiden University Medical Center in 2011. She was the first person to hold a Chair in Primary Care Obstetrics in the Netherlands. That year she was also made Vice Rector Magnificus and joined the Executive Board at Leiden University. Buitendijk led several strategies to improve the educational experiences of students, encouraging innovative teaching practises. She was responsible for the education, policy and diversity initiatives. Under Buitendijk's leadership, Leiden University became one of the first universities in Europe to comprehensively develop massive open online courses and small private online courses.

At Leiden University Buitendijk was made Professor of Women's and Family Health, and started to work on gendered research and innovation. She studied home birth in the Netherlands, finding that home births were as safe as hospital births. She has studied changes in the height and weight of children in the Netherlands and how perinatal factors impact the birth experience. She called for an evaluation and introduction of minimum standards into midwifery in the Netherlands.

Buitendijk called for academia to become more empathetic in an effort to embrace diversity. She co-authored the League of European Research Universities' Women, research and universities: excellence without gender bias, a call-to-arms for universities looking to address the underrepresentation of women in academia. In the report, Buitendijk suggests committed leadership from the top, as well as introducing concrete measures that are targeted to specific career stages, transparency, accountability and monitoring, as well as active promotion of a gender dimension in research. Buitendijk called for The Lancet to require analysis of sex and gender when selecting papers for publication.

In 2016, Buitendijk joined Imperial College London as a Vice Provost for Education. There, she hosted the first Microsoft Campus Connections Summit to be held outside America. Buitendijk partnered Imperial College with Coursera, creating a series of online courses around artificial intelligence. She launched the college's new teaching and learning strategy. Buitendijk described the Teaching Excellence Framework as a "godsend" for university education.

Buitendijk has presented at the Gender Summit and Transform MedEd. She is a member of the League of European Research Universities Gender Steering Group. She has written for the Times Higher Education.

On 14 February 2020 it was announced that Buitendijk would succeed Alan Langlands as Vice Chancellor of the University of Leeds on 1 September 2020.

On 4 October 2023 it was announced that Buitendijk would step down as vice chancellor and president of the University of Leeds on 31 December 2023. Her tenure was marked by controversy, including banning students from the Council Chamber of the Marjory & Arnold Ziff Building - which housed student services - in April 2023. Citing this and other concerns, all three trade unions of staff at the university passed no confidence motions in Buitendijk as Vice Chancellor and President in the summer preceding her resignation.

In July 2024, Buitendijk was appointed to the position of Deputy Vice-Chancellor and Provost at the University of Salford. In January 2024 it had been announced that she would take up the post on an interim basis for six months from the start of February. This was a new post, advertised in March 2024.

== Accusations of transphobia ==
In August 2020 staff and colleagues wrote an open letter challenging Buitendijk's support of transphobic tweets and accounts from her Twitter account. In March 2021 the university was forced to withdraw a draft of a new Trans Equality Policy which was opposed by both staff and students. Later the same year, staff wrote a further open letter to Buitendijk calling for an end to what was termed a "hostile environment" for staff and students, based on issues with an IT system that forced people to out themselves by revealing deadnames. Buitendijk's tenure also saw her commission research entitled The Big Leeds Conversation, during the course of which both racist and transphobic views were shared in the anonymous survey; it was noted by staff and students that whilst racist views were removed by moderators transphobic ones were not.

== International collaborations and positions ==
In 2022 Buitendijk co-founded the Knowledge Equity Network alongside the University of Pretoria, a major new initiative to open up access to higher education and thereby address global challenges. The Network officially launched in November 2022 and asks leaders, policymakers, HEIs, funders and experts to sign up to a global declaration and establish unrestricted, open and equitable access to quality education and research.

Buitendijk was elected to the Council of the Association of Commonwealth Universities in July 2023 and said: "It is an honour and a privilege to represent the ACU's UK members on its Council, working alongside colleagues from an exciting and diverse membership base. Together, we will forge relationships, further our reach and build a better world for everyone."

== Response to Council Chamber occupation ==
Buitendijk was the subject of controversy in May 2022 when students at the University of Leeds staged a five-day occupation of the Council Chamber of the Marjorie and Arnold Ziff building in protest over treatment of staff. Their demands were:

1. No pay deductions for staff taking part in the marking and assessment boycott
2. The Vice-Chancellor commits to resolving the Leeds UCU and Unison disputes by supporting their demands.

The vice-chancellor met with the occupying students on the first day and was secretly recorded in an edited video posted to Twitter asking "Why do you think it's so terrible?" and "Why are you striking?" in response to questions about what she would do about the working conditions of staff at the university. This was allegedly despite not meeting with representatives from the UCU or Unison in over a year or responding to emails from them.

Students highlighted the contrast in conditions of staff being threatened with 100% pay deductions for taking part in a marking boycott to demand fair pay, and of the Vice-Chancellor whose salary was £336,000 in 2020-21, a £42,000 rise from her predecessor.

On the fourth day of the occupation, students put out a request on Twitter for staff members to send in their personal experiences at the university to a padlet and then played them over a speaker outside senior management's offices which included Buitendijk's.

On 10 June 2022, the Leeds UCU announced that members had accepted an offer negotiated with the university which led to no pay deductions for those who took part in the marking boycott.
