= Castle Meadow Campus =

University campus and building complex in Nottingham city centre

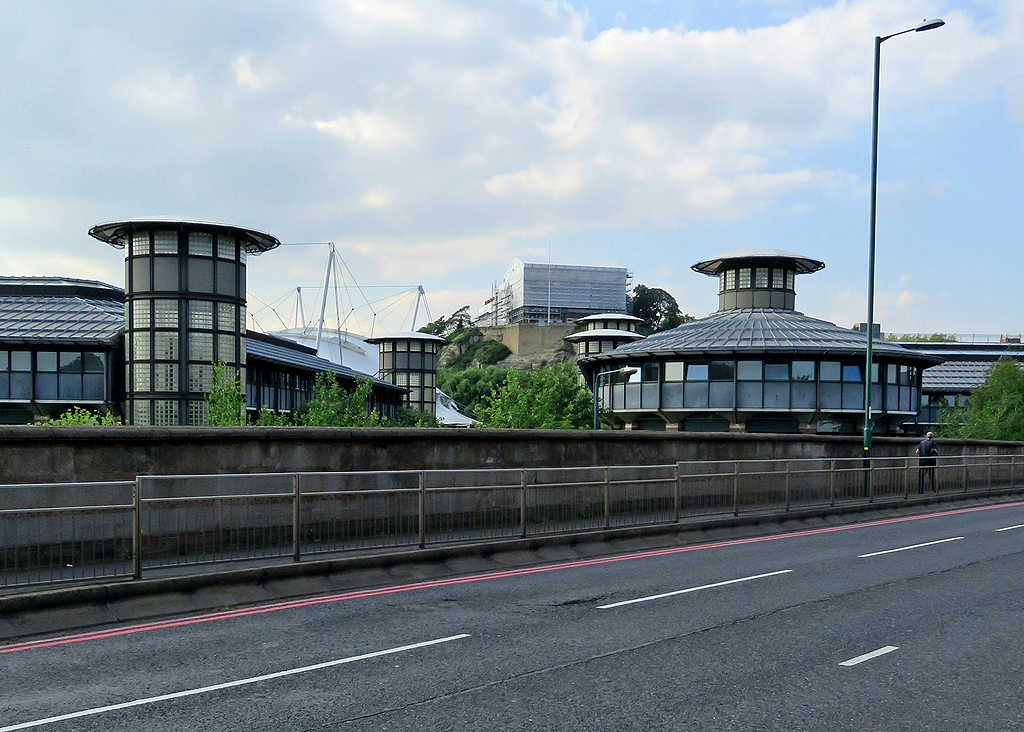
- A view from Wilford Road

- Location within Nottinghamshire

General information
- Type: University campus (former tax office)
- Location: Nottingham, NG2 1AB
- Coordinates: 52.947°N 1.154°W
- Elevation: 30 m (98 ft)
- Construction started: 18 January 1993
- Completed: February 1995
- Inaugurated: 19 May 1995
- Cost: £76m.
- Client: Inland Revenue
- Owner: University of Nottingham

Technical details
- Structural system: Concrete and brick
- Floor area: 120,000 square feet (39,000 sq m)

Design and construction
- Architect: Hopkins
- Architecture firm: Michael Hopkins and Partners
- Structural engineer: Arup Group
- Services engineer: Arup Group, Christian Bartenbach (lighting)
- Main contractor: Laing Management

Castle Meadow Campus is a distinctive and large series of buildings in the west of the centre of Nottingham, completed in 1994 and occupied by HM Revenue and Customs (HMRC) from its construction until 2021, when it was purchased by the University of Nottingham.

The campus comprises seven buildings with tree-lined boulevards. It is built on a former railway goods yard off the A453 off Castle Meadow Road, next to the Nottingham Canal.

== History ==
There was to be parking for 350 cars, and 37,000 square metres of office. The Inland Revenue bought the seven-acre site from British Rail in April 1990. It was planned to open in 1992, and to cost £58m.

In May 1997 many staff complained that the building made them ill, due to high temperatures, with headaches and blurred vision.

=== HMRC ===
It housed around 1,800 HMRC staff. It operated the Enterprise Investment Scheme, Corporate Venturing Scheme, Venture Capital Trusts, and Enterprise Management Incentives, HMRC's Pension Schemes Services, and the Residency department, which dealt with Double Taxation Treaties and inheritance tax. It had the Valuation Office Agency for the East Midlands and East of England.

=== University of Nottingham ===
The University of Nottingham bought the campus from HMRC in 2021 for £37.5 million and spent over £45 million redeveloping it, leading to criticism of the campus by unions as a "vanity project". In 2025, the university announced plans to sell the campus.

== Design ==
The first designs in January 1991 were described as being 'like a 1960s comprehensive school'. The local council planning committee did not like the design, and told the Inland Revenue to come up with something a bit better in July 1991, describing the design as 'too 1960s' and had too much 'ugliness'.

Six architectural practices were shortlisted in a competition in October 1991. The six competing designs were announced on 15 January 1992. Hopkins design was announced as the winner on Monday 24 February 1992, by Francis Maude.

The buildings were designed by Hopkins Architects with engineering by Arup Group. The design employs natural ventilation. The main Amenity Building has a fabric roof suspended from four raking steel masts. The design employs the thermal mass of the concrete to cool the building at night. There are 1,052 pre-built deep brick piers with 863 concrete ceiling beams.

In May 2023 the buildings were listed at Grade II.

== Construction ==
Construction would start in January 1993, to be finished by the end of 1994, and to be occupied during 1995. Stephen Dorrell, the Financial Secretary to the Treasury, officially started the construction, by Laing, on Monday 18 January 1993, with Sir Anthony Battishill, chairman of the Inland Revenue. Work on the first floor began in late June 1993.

The topping out ceremony was on Thursday 24 February 1994, by project manager James O'Hare. The fabric structure was built in July 1994, for the amenity building. The building was completed by February 1995.

The building was officially opened by Kenneth Clarke, the Chancellor of the Exchequer, on Friday 19 May 1995. It had cost £76m.

== See also ==
- Renault Centre
- Campuses of the University of Nottingham
- Castle Meadow Retail Park, owned by National Freight Properties
