= Jane Norman (professor) =

Scottish physician

Jane Norman FRSE

Vice Chancellor of the University of Nottingham
- Incumbent
- Assumed office November 2024
- Preceded by: Shearer West

Personal details
- Education: University of Edinburgh (MBBS, MD)

Jane Norman is a Scottish academic and physician who has been the Vice-Chancellor of the University of Nottingham since January 2025, having previously taken the position on an interim basis since November 2024. She was previously the Provost and Deputy Vice-Chancellor of the University of Nottingham and had served as the Dean of the Faculty of Health Sciences at the University of Bristol in 2019.

== Education ==
Norman graduated in medicine from the University of Edinburgh in 1986. After early clinical and academic training in obstetrics and gynaecology in Edinburgh, she was awarded the degree of MD by the University of Edinburgh in 1992.

== Research and career ==
Norman was Regius Chair of obstetrics and gynaecology at the University of Glasgow and Head of the Section of Reproductive and Maternal Medicine from 2006. In 2008, she became Professor of Maternal and Fetal Health at the University of Edinburgh and Director of the Edinburgh Tommy's Centre for maternal and fetal health research. In 2014, she also became Vice-principal of Equality and Diversity (now Vice-principal, People and Culture) at the University of Edinburgh.

Her research focusses on the pregnancy “stressors” of obesity, maternal depression/stress, inflammation and hypoxia.

She previously maintained a clinical practice as a Consultant Obstetrician at the Royal Infirmary of Edinburgh.

=== Future Nottingham ===
As Vice-Chancellor of the University of Nottingham, she has overseen a programme, named Future Nottingham, that proposes cutting more than 600 academic jobs, as well as 48 degrees (including all modern languages and music), with 2700 staff in total put on notice. Some departments, such as the chemistry department, are facing staff cuts of over 30%,. Petitions against the cuts at various departments have gained signatures from thousands of academics, including several Nobel Laureates.

== Select publications ==
- Challis, John; Charles J Lockwood; Myatt, Leslie; Norman, Jane Elizabeth; Jerome F Strauss; Petraglia, Felice (2009). "Inflammation and pregnancy". Reproductive Sciences. 16 (2): 206–215. doi:10.1177/1933719108329095. PMID 19208789. Wikidata Q37390203.
- Roberts, Kirsty; Riley, Simon Christopher; Reynolds, Rebecca; S. Barr; M. Evans; A. Statham; K. Hor; H.N. Jabbour; Norman, Jane Elizabeth; Denison, Fiona (2011). "Placental structure and inflammation in pregnancies associated with obesity". Placenta. 32 (3): 247–254. doi:10.1016/j.placenta.2010.12.023. PMID 21232790. Wikidata Q46328759.
- Denison, Fiona; Roberts, Kirsty; S M Barr; Norman, Jane Elizabeth (2010). "Obesity, pregnancy, inflammation, and vascular function". Reproduction. 140 (3): 373–385. doi:10.1530/rep-10-0074. PMID 20215337. Wikidata Q37705670.

== Professional qualifications ==
- Fellowship of the Academy of Medical Sciences, F Med Sci
- Fellowship of the Royal College of Physicians of Edinburgh, FRCP (Edin)
- Fellowship of the Society of Biology, FSB
- Faculty of Pharmaceutical Medicine, RCP, Certificate in GCP
- Royal College of Obstetricians and Gynaecologists, FCRO
- STA Royal College of Medical Colleges, CCT
- Royal College of Obstetricians and Gynaecologists, MRCOG
- Fellowship of the Royal Society of Edinburgh, FRSE

Academic offices
| Preceded by Shearer West | Vice-Chancellor of the University of Nottingham; November 2024 – present | Succeeded by Incumbent |
