= Shearer West =

American art historian

Shearer West CBE

Vice Chancellor of the University of Leeds
- Incumbent
- Assumed office November 2024
- Preceded by: Hai-Sui Yu (acting)

Vice Chancellor of the University of Nottingham
- In office October 2017 – October 2024
- Preceded by: David Greenaway
- Succeeded by: Jane Norman

Personal details
- Education: College of William and Mary (BA); University of St Andrews (PhD)

Academic background
- Thesis: The Theatrical Portrait in Eighteenth Century London (1986)

Shearer Carroll West CBE is a British-American art-historian and university administrator serving as the Vice-Chancellor of the University of Leeds since 2024. She was the Vice-Chancellor of the University of Nottingham from 2017 to 2024.

== Early life and education ==
West was raised in Rocky Mount, a small town in southwest Virginia. Her father worked as a factory floor supervisor, and her mother was a high school teacher. West was the first in her family to attend university. West holds a B.A. in art history and English from the College of William & Mary, in Virginia, and a Ph.D. (1986) in art history, specializing in European art and visual culture, from the University of St Andrews. Her dissertation supervisors were Martin Kemp and Robin Spencer.

== Biography and career ==
West began her career in academic publishing, working as an editor for the Grove Dictionary of Art. She then transitioned to her first academic appointment at the University of Leicester, where she began to focus her research on portraiture and visual culture within European contexts. Her early scholarly contributions laid the foundation for her ongoing research interests in the relationship between art and social identity.

In 1996, West moved to the University of Birmingham to serve as Head of the Department of History of Art. During this period, she conducted research that would eventually be published in works such as Fin de Siècle: Art and Society in an Age of Uncertainty, a book that examined the cultural anxieties and artistic innovations of the late 19th and early 20th centuries. This work, along with her other publications, explored themes of societal change and the role of the visual arts in shaping cultural narratives. In 2000, West's academic contributions were recognized with a personal chair at Birmingham, elevating her to the rank of full professor. Subsequently, she expanded her responsibilities to include Head of the School of Historical Studies and, briefly, Acting Head of the College of Arts and Law.

In 2008, West was appointed Director of Research at the Arts and Humanities Research Council (AHRC), where she chaired the Research Directors Group for Research Councils UK. In this capacity, she directed efforts to foster interdisciplinary and collaborative research within the arts and humanities. Her role at AHRC marked a shift in her career toward research management and policy development, although she continued her own scholarship in art history, focusing on themes such as German art and cultural identity. Her book The Visual Arts in Germany 1897-1940: Utopia and Despair was published during this time, analyzing how visual arts in Germany reflected the sociopolitical climate leading up to World War II.

In 2011, West joined the University of Oxford as Head of the Humanities Division. Here, she oversaw initiatives such as the Oxford Research Centre in the Humanities (TORCH), an interdisciplinary platform for collaborative research, and the Ertegun Graduate Scholarship Programme in the Humanities, which provided support for humanities graduate students. During her tenure, she researched portraiture, which culminated in the publication of Portraiture, an examination of the history and cultural significance of portraiture as a genre.

In 2015, West became Provost and Deputy Vice-Chancellor at the University of Sheffield. In this role, she managed academic strategy and oversaw the university's research and educational missions. Her leadership at Sheffield involved significant responsibilities in institutional governance, but she continued to support humanities research through her advisory roles and contributions to scholarly evaluations.

On October 2, 2017, West was appointed Vice-Chancellor and President of the University of Nottingham, becoming the seventh individual to hold this position. Shortly after assuming office, she published a new University Strategy in December 2019, which emphasized the university's priorities for research excellence, education, and community outreach. In this role, she represents the institution on the Universities UK Board. West was appointed Commander of the Order of the British Empire (CBE) in the 2021 New Year Honours for services to education.

During her tenure at the University of Nottingham, she oversaw several capital and infrastructure projects that faced criticism for cost overruns. These included an £80 million investment in a new campus that was subsequently sold for £14 million before becoming operational, as well as an IT transformation project that cost £80 million against an initial £50 million budget. A subsequent review of the IT project concluded that the implementation was overly complex. To fund these initiatives, the university implemented a redundancy program that affected approximately 30 percent of its staff. In May 2026, the university announced further cost-cutting measures, placing thousands of staff members at risk of redundancy in an effort to close a projected budget deficit.

In November 2024, West assumed the position of Vice-Chancellor at the University of Leeds, succeeding Simone Buitendijk and acting Vice-Chancellor Hai-Sui Yu.

== Selected publications ==
- The Image of the Actor: Verbal and Visual Representation in the Age of Garrick and Kemble, Palgrave MacMillan, 1991. ISBN 0312057385
- Fin De Siecle: Art and society in an age of uncertainty, The Overlook Press, 1994.
- The visual arts in Germany 1897-1940: Utopia and Despair, Rutgers University Press, 2001. ISBN 0813529115
- Portraiture, Oxford University Press, Oxford, 2004. (Oxford History of Art)

Academic offices
Preceded by Simone Buitendijk	Vice-Chancellor of the University of Leeds; November 2024 – present	Succeeded by Incumbent
Preceded by Sir David Greenaway	Vice-Chancellor of the University of Nottingham; October 2017 – October 2024	Succeeded by Jane Norman
