= European Journal of International Security =

- Discipline: Security studies, International relations
- Language: English
- Edited by: Edward Newman, Jason Ralph and Jacqui True

Publication details
- History: 2016–present
- Publisher: Cambridge University Press on behalf of British International Studies Association (United Kingdom)
- Frequency: 4/year

Standard abbreviations
- ISO 4: Eur. J. Int. Secur.

Indexing
- ISSN: 2057-5637 (print); 2057-5645 (web)

Links
- Journal homepage

The European Journal of International Security is a peer-reviewed academic journal that publishes theoretical, methodological and empirical papers at the cutting-edge of research into international and global security challenges. It is published by Cambridge University Press on behalf of the British International Studies Association. The current editors are Professor Edward Newman, University of Leeds, UK, Professor Jason Ralph, University of Leeds, UK, Professor Jacqui True, Monash University, Australia.
