= Al Qaeda Handbook =

Guide for Islamic Jihad

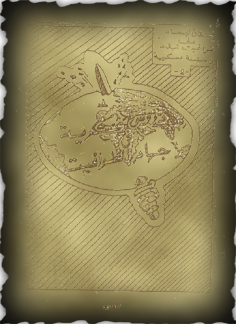
Cover of "The Manchester Manual".

The Al Qaeda Handbook 1677-T 1D is a computer file found by police during a search of the Manchester home of Anas al-Liby in 2000. A translation has been provided by the American Federal Bureau of Investigation. Officials state that the document is a manual for how to wage war, and according to the American military, was written by Osama bin Laden's extremist group, al-Qaeda. However, the manual was likely written either by a member of Egyptian Islamic Jihad or al-Gama'a al-Islamiyya; in addition, the mentioned targets in the manual are the rulers of Arab countries, not the West.

Some of the selected translated text from the manual are found on a United States Department of Justice website. (Only some of the manual is provided because it "does not want to aid in educating terrorists or encourage further acts of terrorism".)

The handbook has been repeatedly invoked by American officials when confronted with accusations of detainee abuse or torture.

== Contents ==
The manual was found in a computer file described as "the military series" related to the "Declaration of Jihad." According to the United States military, the handbook contains 180 pages divided into 18 chapters. It reportedly begins, "The confrontation we are calling for... knows the dialogue of bullets, the ideals of assassination, bombing and destruction, and the diplomacy of the cannon and machine gun." Excerpts publicly available describe the structure of a military organization whose main mission is the "overthrow of the godless regimes and their replacement with an Islamic regime," and include instructions on counterfeiting and forgery, security measures for undercover activities, and strategies in the case of arrest and indictment. The handbook provides religious justifications and quotations from the Qur'an throughout.

The military states that the handbook instructs members of Al Qaeda how to lie to captors during interrogation, and falsely claim they are being tortured.

=== Claims of torture ===
Department of Defense spokesmen routinely state that Guantanamo captives were trained using the manual. American Defense Secretary Donald Rumsfeld dismissed detainee allegations of torture at Guantanamo, stated that "detainees are trained to lie, they're trained to say they were tortured."

== Arrests for downloading manual in England ==
A student and a researcher at the University of Nottingham, studying extremism, were arrested in 2008 after downloading the Handbook from a U.S. Government site to a University of Nottingham computer. Twenty-six academics at the University signed a petition in protest of the arrests. They were released a week later, but one was subsequently charged with visa irregularities, and the ensuing controversy within the university led to the suspension of the educator teaching the terrorism course.

== See also ==
- Management of Savagery
