= Rubixanthin =

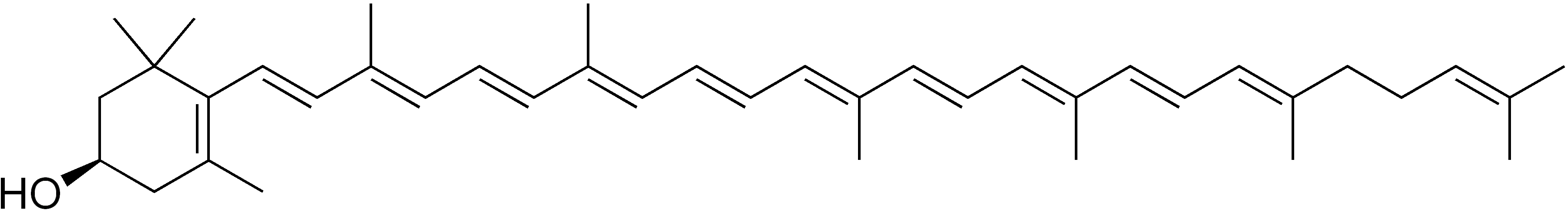

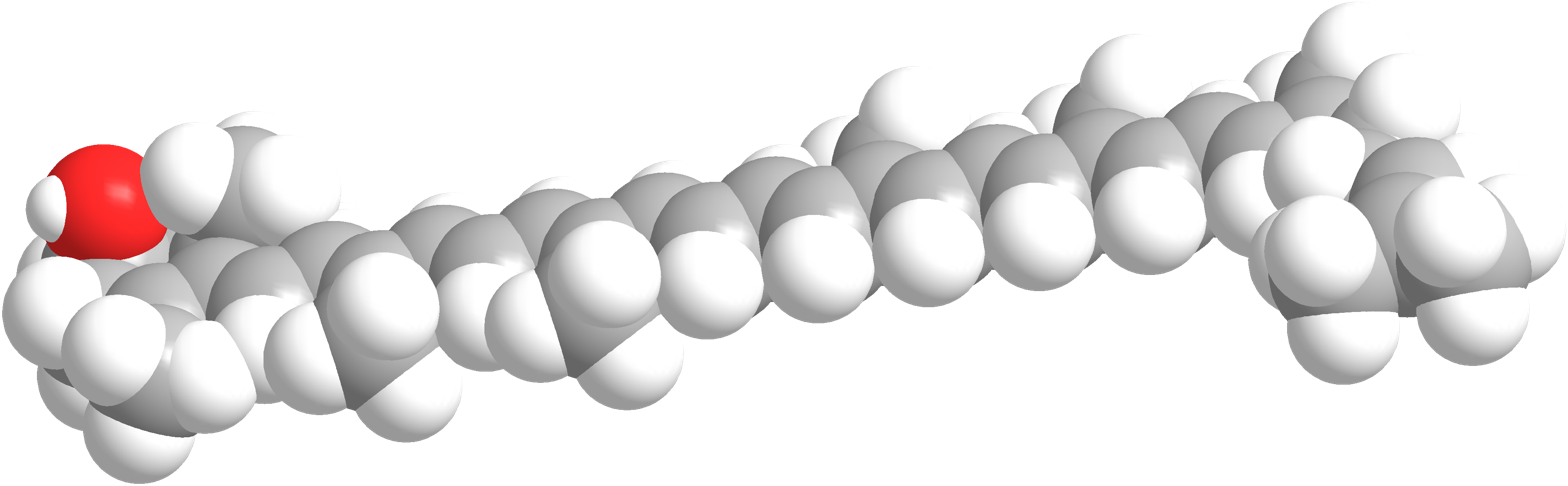

Names
- IUPAC name (3R)-β,ψ-Caroten-3-ol
- Systematic IUPAC name (1R)-4-[(1E,3E,5E,7E,9E,11E,13E,15E,17E,19E)-3,7,12,16,20,24-Hexamethylpentacosa-1,3,5,7,9,11,13,15,17,19,23-undecaen-1-yl]-3,5,5-trimethylcyclohex-3-en-1-ol
- Other names: Natural yellow 27; E161d

Identifiers
CAS Number	3763-55-1
3D model (JSmol)	Interactive image
ChEBI	CHEBI:8907
ChemSpider	4444664
ECHA InfoCard	100.292.282
E number	E161d (colours)
PubChem CID	5281252
UNII	0PWJ89032Q
- InChI: InChI=1S/C40H56O/c1-31(2)17-13-20-34(5)23-15-25-35(6)24-14-21-32(3)18-11-12-19-33(4)22-16-26-36(7)27-28-39-37(8)29-38(41)30-40(39,9)10/h11-12,14-19,21-28,38,41H,13,20,29-30H2,1-10H3/b12-11+,21-14+,22-16+,25-15+,28-27+,32-18+,33-19+,34-23+,35-24+,36-26+/t38-/m1/s1 Key: ABTRFGSPYXCGMR-AXXBKCDFSA-N
- SMILES: CC1=C(C(C[C@@H](C1)O)(C)C)\C=C\C(=C\C=C\C(=C\C=C\C=C(/C)\C=C\C=C(/C)\C=C\C=C(/C)\CCC=C(C)C)\C)\C

Properties
Chemical formula	C_{40}H_{56}O
Molar mass	552.85 g/mol
Appearance	Red-orange crystals
Melting point	160 °C (320 °F; 433 K)
- Except where otherwise noted, data are given for materials in their standard state (at 25 °C [77 °F], 100 kPa). verify (what is ?) Infobox references

Rubixanthin, or natural yellow 27, is a natural xanthophyll pigment with a red-orange color found in rose hips. As a food additive it used under the E number E161d as a food coloring; it is not approved for use in the USA or EU but is approved in Australia and New Zealand where it is listed as 161d.
