= European Security =

- Discipline: Security
- Language: English
- Edited by: Jocelyn Mawdsley; Laura Chappell

Publication details
- History: 1992–present
- Publisher: Taylor and Francis (United Kingdom)
- Frequency: Quarterly

Standard abbreviations
- ISO 4: Eur. Secur.

Indexing
- ISSN: 0966-2839 (print); 1746-1545 (web)
- LCCN: 94648255
- JSTOR: 09662839
- OCLC no.: 56717132

Links
- Journal homepage; Online access; Online archive

European Security is a quarterly peer-reviewed academic journal published by Taylor and Francis for discussing challenges and approaches to security within the region as well as for Europe in a global context. It was established in 1992 with the founding editor Jacob Kipp (Fort Leavenworth), the current co-editors are Jocelyn Mawdsley (University of Newcastle) and Laura Chappell (University of Surrey).

According to the Journal Citation Reports, the journal has a 2022 impact factor of 1.6. It is thus ranked #24 out of 84 journals within the category of Area Studies. However, according to another metric, the TQCC (top quartile citation count), European Security is ranked #1 in that category as of early 2024.

== Abstracting and indexing ==
The journal is abstracted and indexed in:

- CSA Worldwide Political Science Abstracts
- International Bibliography of the Social Sciences
- International Political Science Abstracts
- The Lancaster Index to Defence and International Security Literature
- A Matter of Fact
