= British International Studies Association =

Learned society

- Abbreviation: BISA
- Formation: January 1974; 52 years ago
- Founded at: University of Surrey
- Type: Learned society
- Purpose: Promotes the study of international relations and related subjects through teaching, research, and facilitation of contact between scholars.
- Headquarters: University of Birmingham
- Location: Birmingham, United Kingdom
- Members: 1500+
- Chair: Mark Webber
- Former Chair: Richard Whitman
- Key people: Alastair Francis Buchan (founding chairman), RJ Jones (founding secretary), Susan Strange (founding treasurer), PA Reynolds, G Goodwin, D Wrightman, CM Mason, T Taylor, A James, J Spence
- Parent organization: Academy of Social Sciences
- Website: www.bisa.ac.uk

The British International Studies Association (BISA) is a learned society that promotes the study of international relations and related subjects through teaching, research, and facilitation of contact between scholars. BISA has an international membership of over 1,500 members, with over 80 countries represented. Chair is Mark Webber (University of Birmingham). He succeeded Richard Whitman (University of Kent), who served as chair until 2015. The national office is based at the University of Birmingham.

BISA is a member society of the Academy of Social Sciences.

== Foundation ==
In Jan 1974 an inaugural meeting was held at the 14th Bailey Conference on International Studies at the University of Surrey, and at that time, a draft interim constitution was agreed. The interim executive committee consisted of Alastair Francis Buchan (chairman), RJ Jones (secretary), Susan Strange (treasurer), PA Reynolds, G Goodwin, D Wrightman, CM Mason, T Taylor, A James and J Spence.

== Publications ==
- Review of International Studies
- European Journal of International Security
- The book series Cambridge Studies in International Relations in collaboration with Cambridge University Press

== Annual prizes ==
BISA awards the following prizes at its annual international conference:

- Distinguished Contribution Prize
- Michael Nicholson Thesis Prize
- Susan Strange Book Prize
- PG BISA Teaching Excellence Prize
- BISA Teaching Excellence Prize
- Best Article in Review of International Studies

== Working groups ==
Working groups are formed by members to enable collaboration and networking in specific subfields. There are currently about 30 groups focusing on specific areas of study and collaboration.

== Funding ==
The association makes available funding via a variety of routes, working group funding, conference bursaries, founders fund awards, postgraduate network funding etc. Introduced in 2015, BISA also offers funding for Early Career Researchers’ projects with grants of up to £3,000.
