= University of Nottingham =

Public research university in England

- Coat of arms
- Motto: Latin: Sapientia urbs conditur
- Motto in English: A city is built on wisdom
- Type: Public
- Established: 1798 – As an adult education school; 1881 – University College Nottingham; 1948 – University of Nottingham
- Academic affiliations: ACU; EUA; Midlands Innovation; Russell Group; Universitas 21; Universities UK; Defence Universities Alliance
- Endowment: £82.5 million (2025)
- Budget: £845.0 million (2024/25)
- Visitor: Alan Campbell (as Lord President of the Council ex officio)
- Chancellor: Lola Young, Baroness Young of Hornsey
- President and vice-chancellor: Jane Norman
- Academic staff: 3,850 Nottingham-based (2024/25)
- Students: 36,460 Nottingham-based (2024/25); 15,925 overseas (2023/24)
- Undergraduates: 28,415 (2024/25)
- Postgraduates: 8,050 (2024/25)
- Location: Nottingham, England; 52.939°N 1.197°W
- Colours: Nottingham blue (corporate); Green and gold (sports)
- Website: nottingham.ac.uk

The University of Nottingham is a public research university in Nottingham, England. It was founded as University College Nottingham in 1881, and was granted a royal charter as a university in 1948.

Nottingham's main campus (University Park), the Jubilee Campus and the main teaching hospital (Queen's Medical Centre) are located within the City of Nottingham, with a number of smaller campuses and sites elsewhere in Nottinghamshire and Derbyshire. Outside the UK, the university has campuses in Semenyih, Malaysia, and Ningbo, China. UK academic operations are organised into five faculties, and the university has more than 46,000 students and 7,000 staff across the UK, China and Malaysia. It had an income of £845 million in 2024–25, of which £140.3 million was from research grants and contracts, with an expenditure of £924.2 million.

The institution's alumni, staff and former staff have won three Nobel Prizes and a Fields Medal. The university is a member of the Russell Group and the international Universitas 21 network.

== History ==
=== Founding ===
The University of Nottingham traces its origins to both the founding of an adult education school in 1798, and the University Extension Lectures inaugurated by the University of Cambridge in 1873, which were launched at Nottingham before expanding to other posts of the country. However, the foundation of the university is generally regarded as being the establishment of University College Nottingham, in 1881 as a college preparing students for examinations of the University of London.

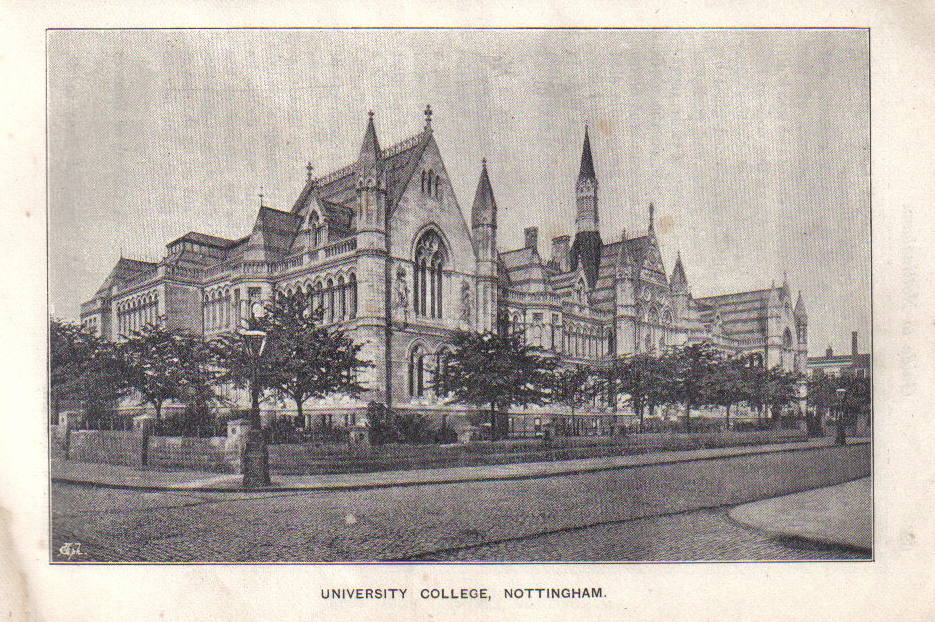
University College Nottingham

In 1875, an anonymous donor provided £10,000 to establish the work of the Adult Education School and Cambridge Extension Lectures on a permanent basis, and the Corporation of Nottingham agreed to erect and maintain a building for this purpose and to provide funds to supply the instruction.

The foundation stone of the college was duly laid in 1877 by the former Prime Minister William Ewart Gladstone, and the college's neo-gothic building on Shakespeare Street was formally opened on 30 July 1881 by Prince Leopold, Duke of Albany, with the college admitting its first students that autumn In 1881, there were four professors – of Literature, Physics, Chemistry and Natural Science. New departments and chairs quickly followed: Engineering in 1884, Classics combined with Philosophy in 1893, French in 1897 and Education in 1905; in 1905 the combined Department of Physics and Mathematics became two separate entities; in 1911 Departments of English and Mining were created, in 1912, Economics, and Geology combined with Geography; History in 1914, Adult Education in 1923 and Pharmacy in 1925. The university college was part of the Borough of Nottingham, under the town clerk's department, until it was incorporated by royal charter in 1903. While this made it formally independent, there was almost complete overlap between the city council and the court of governors.

=== Development ===
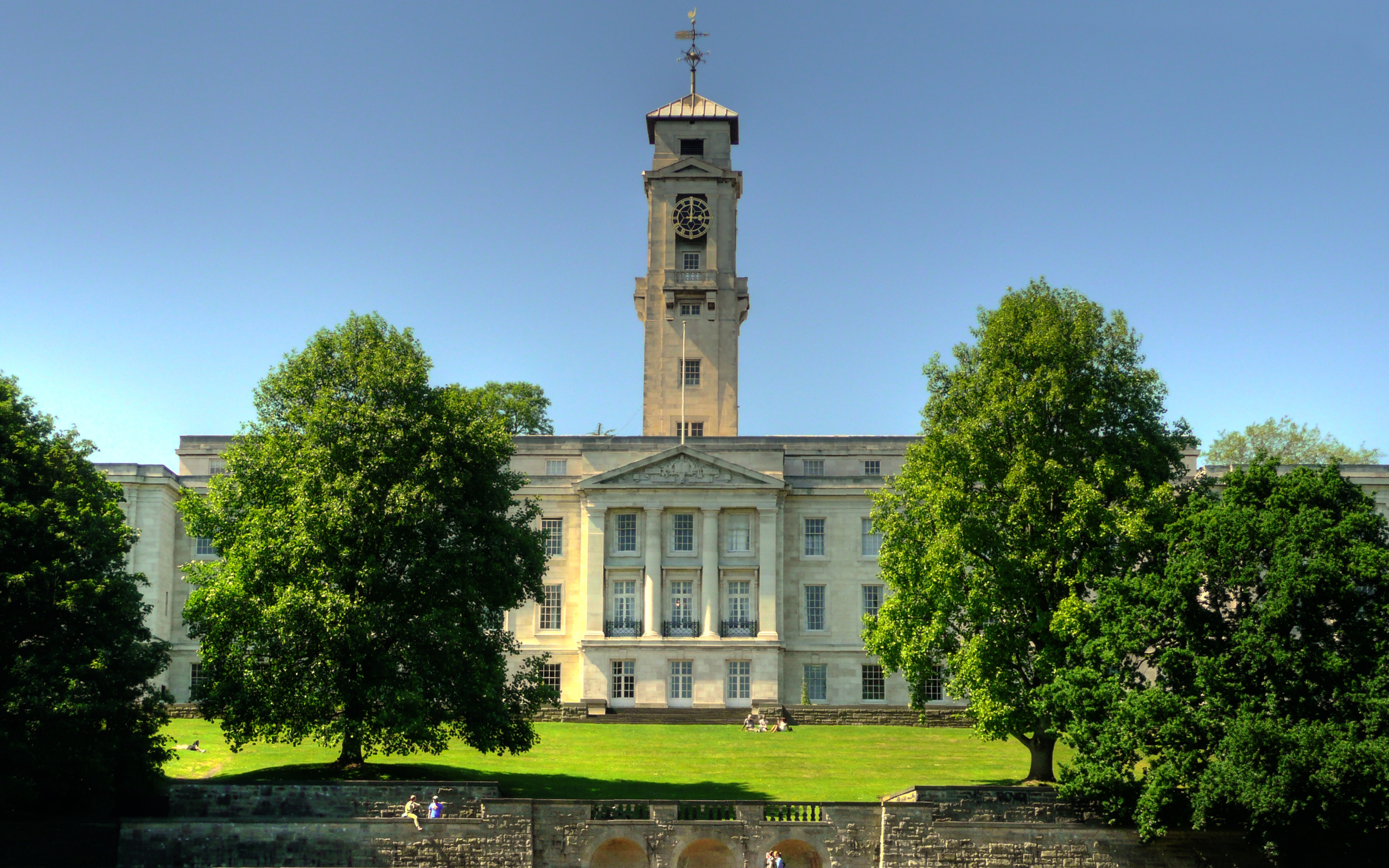
University of Nottingham's Trent Building

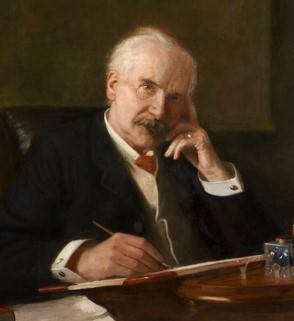
Sir Jesse Boot, pictured, significantly contributed to the development of the university during the 1920s.

Following the first world war, the university college's leadership proposed the creation of a federal East Midlands University, taking in University College Nottingham, University College Leicester, Loughborough College, and other colleges in Lincoln, Derby and Northampton. A charter was drawn up for the federal university but the proposed dominance of Nottingham led to opposition from Leicester in 1923, and in 1927 the proposal was dropped in favour of Nottingham pursuing university status on its own.

The university college underwent significant expansion in the 1920s, when it moved from the centre of Nottingham to a large campus on the city's outskirts. The new campus, called University Park, was completed in 1928, and financed by an endowment fund, public contributions, and the generosity of Sir Jesse Boot (later Lord Trent) who presented 35 acres (14 ha) to the City of Nottingham in 1921. Boot and his fellow benefactors sought to establish an "elite seat of learning" committed to widening participation, and hoped that the move would solve the problems facing University College Nottingham, in its restricted building on Shakespeare Street. Boot stipulated that, whilst part of the Highfields site, lying south-west of the city, should be devoted to the university college, the rest should provide a place of recreation for the residents of the city, and, by the end of the decade, the landscaping of the lake and public park adjoining University Boulevard was completed. The original university college building on Shakespeare Street in central Nottingham, known as the Arkwright Building, now forms part of Nottingham Trent University's City Campus.

University College Nottingham was initially accommodated within the Trent Building, an imposing white limestone structure with a distinctive clock tower, designed by Morley Horder, and formally opened by King George V on 10 July 1928. During this period of development, Nottingham attracted high-profile visiting speakers, including Albert Einstein, H. G. Wells, and Mahatma Gandhi. The blackboard used by Einstein for his lecture at Nottingham is still on display in the Physics department.

Apart from its physical transfer to surroundings that could not be more different from its original home, the college made few developments between the wars. The Department of Slavonic Languages (later Slavonic Studies) was established in 1933, the teaching of Russian having been introduced in 1916. In 1933–34, the departments of Electrical Engineering, Zoology and Geography, which had been combined with other subjects, were made independent; and in 1938 a supplemental charter provided for a much wider representation on the governing body. However, further advances were delayed by the outbreak of war in 1939.

=== Second World War ===
350-400 students from Goldsmiths' College and 120 students from the Institute of Education were evacuated from London to Nottingham during the war. Goldsmiths' arrived on Monday 18 September 1939. At the time it was the largest teacher training college in the country and included the artist Evelyn Gibbs on its staff. The Institute of Education returned to London in July 1943. However, the Goldsmiths' buildings in London had been badly damaged so the college remained in Nottingham for another year.

=== University status ===
Until 1948, students of University College Nottingham students sat exams from and were awarded degrees by the University of London. In 1948, the institution was granted a royal charter as the University of Nottingham, giving it university status and the power to confer its own degrees.

In the 1940s, the Midlands Agricultural and Dairy College at Sutton Bonington merged with the university as the School of Agriculture, and in 1956 the Portland Building was completed to complement the Trent Building. In 1970, the university established the UK's first new medical school of the 20th century.

=== Late 20th century and early 21st century ===
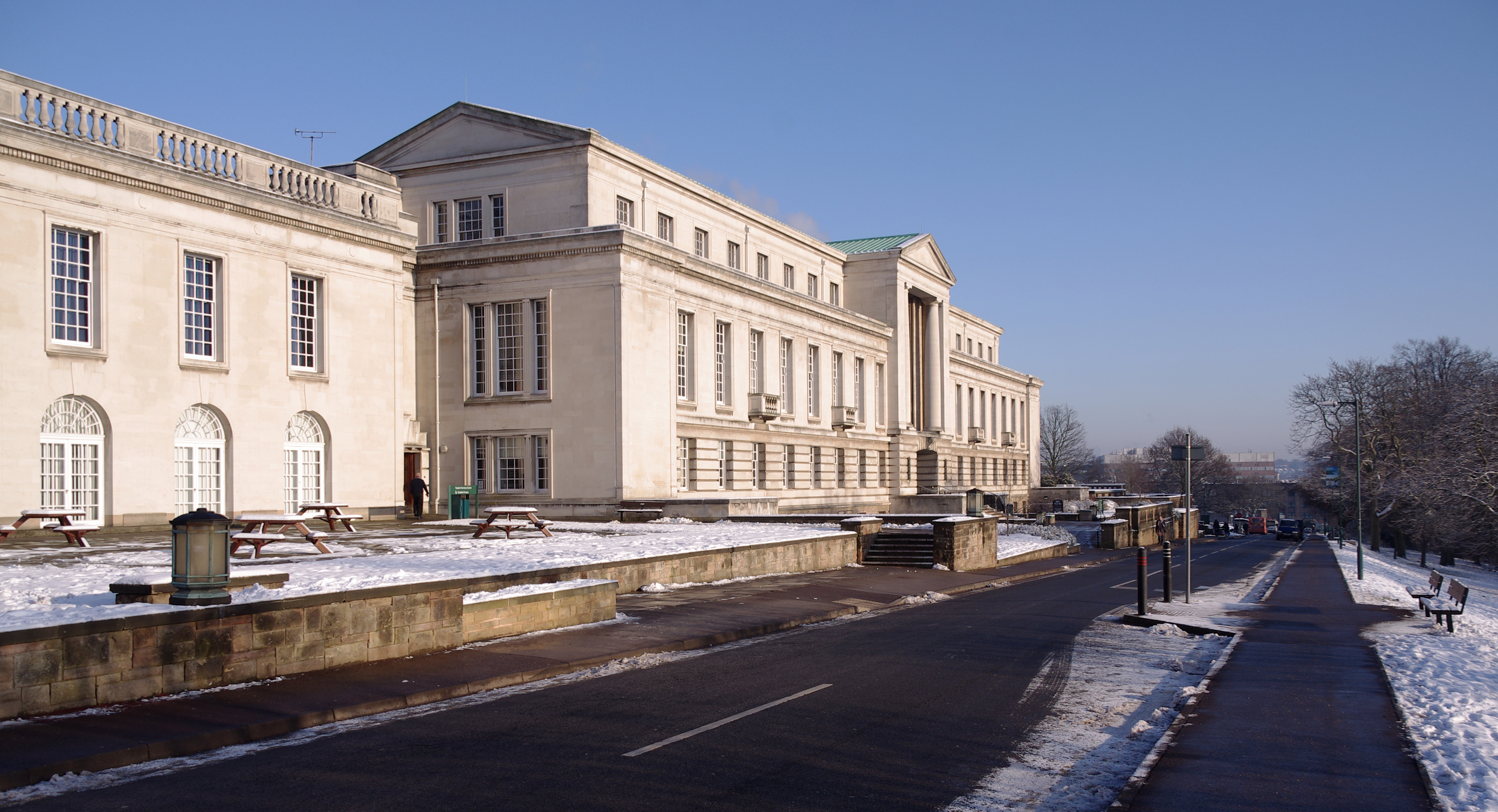
University Park, Portland Building

In 1999, Jubilee Campus was opened on the former site of the Raleigh Bicycle Company, one mile (1.6 km) away from the University Park Campus. Nottingham then began to expand overseas, opening campuses in Malaysia and in China in 1999 and 2004 respectively. In 2005, the King's Meadow Campus opened near University Park.

In 2008, the "Nottingham Two", a member of staff and a postgraduate student at the university, were detained under the Terrorism Act 2000 after the university reported finding an edited version of the al-Qaeda training manual the student was using for his research. Subsequently, the teaching of terrorism studies was dropped at the university.

The university's student rag, Karnival, was suspended in 2016 to ensure compliance with the Charities Act 2016, particularly in the safeguarding of participants in fundraising activities and the people they interacted with. It was reinstated later that year, but an investigation the following year, 2017, determined that "RAG raids" had breached the safeguarding requirements and health and safety policies on multiple occasions, leading the students' union executive to ban these activities.

In the 2020–21 academic year, students of the University of Nottingham organised large-scale campaigns for wider academic, welfare, and financial support for students during the COVID-19 pandemic.

In 2021, the university briefly blocked the appointment of a Catholic chaplain due to his social media posts on abortion and euthanasia. The university maintained that their concern was not about the priest's views but the way they had been expressed. Following discussions, the priest was able to take up the post the following month.

In November 2023, the University of Nottingham became the first university in the UK to be awarded an institutional Athena SWAN Gold Award for its commitment to advancing gender equality.

=== Financial crisis ===
In January 2025, the university announced plans to sell its King's Meadow Campus. In November 2025, the university announced that it would permanently suspend 16 courses, including all modern language and music courses, for new students, and that it intended to sell its Castle Meadow Campus. It cited "significant financial challenges" due to decreasing numbers of students, especially international students, as the reason. The accounts for 2024/25 revealed that the Castle Meadow Campus, which the university bought for £37.5 million in 2021 and spent over £40 million refurbishing, was now valued at between £14.8 and £18 million.

In May 2026, the university announced that it could run out of money within five years if further cuts were not made, and warned 2,700 staff that they were at risk of redundancy. The university said it plans to cut over 600 academic and support posts through voluntary redundancies: over 150 in medicine and health science, 134 in the arts faculty, 108 in social sciences, 97 in sciences, and 38 in engineering. These cuts amount to over 30% of staff in some departments. Petitions against the cuts at the chemistry and physics departments gained signatures from thousands of academics, including several Nobel laureates and BBC science presenters. Presenter and emeritus professor Jim Al-Khalili stated that "Nottingham Physics is one of the most respected and prestigious departments in the country, and this proposed ‘cull’ would be both devastating and foolish", while Nobel prize-winner Roger Penrose added that "the decision to dismiss this large group of physics and astronomy faculty members at the University of Nottingham, through no fault of their own, is appalling and should be reversed immediately".

In June 2026, the university informed students and alumni that it had suffered a data breach in its Campus Solutions system, provided by Oracle. Students' personal and financial data was exposed. University management had spent £16.4 million introducing the system.

In September 2026, the Universities and Colleges Union announced a ten-week strike from October through to December, in protest against the planned cuts. The Guardian reported that this left students "fac[ing] a term without any teaching", while the university said they expected that "many students will experience little or no disruption".

In October 2026, the university confirmed 560 job cuts (reduced from the over 600 previously planned), the closing of courses once current students had graduated, including the complete closure of the music and modern languages departments, and the reorganisation of the university into three "colleges" – health, humanities and social sciences, and science and engineering – by August 2027, replacing the faculties. The university also announced that a new language centre would enable students on most degree courses to take a foreign language module and that extra-curricular music activities would continue to be supported.

== Campuses ==
=== UK campuses ===
==== University Park Campus ====
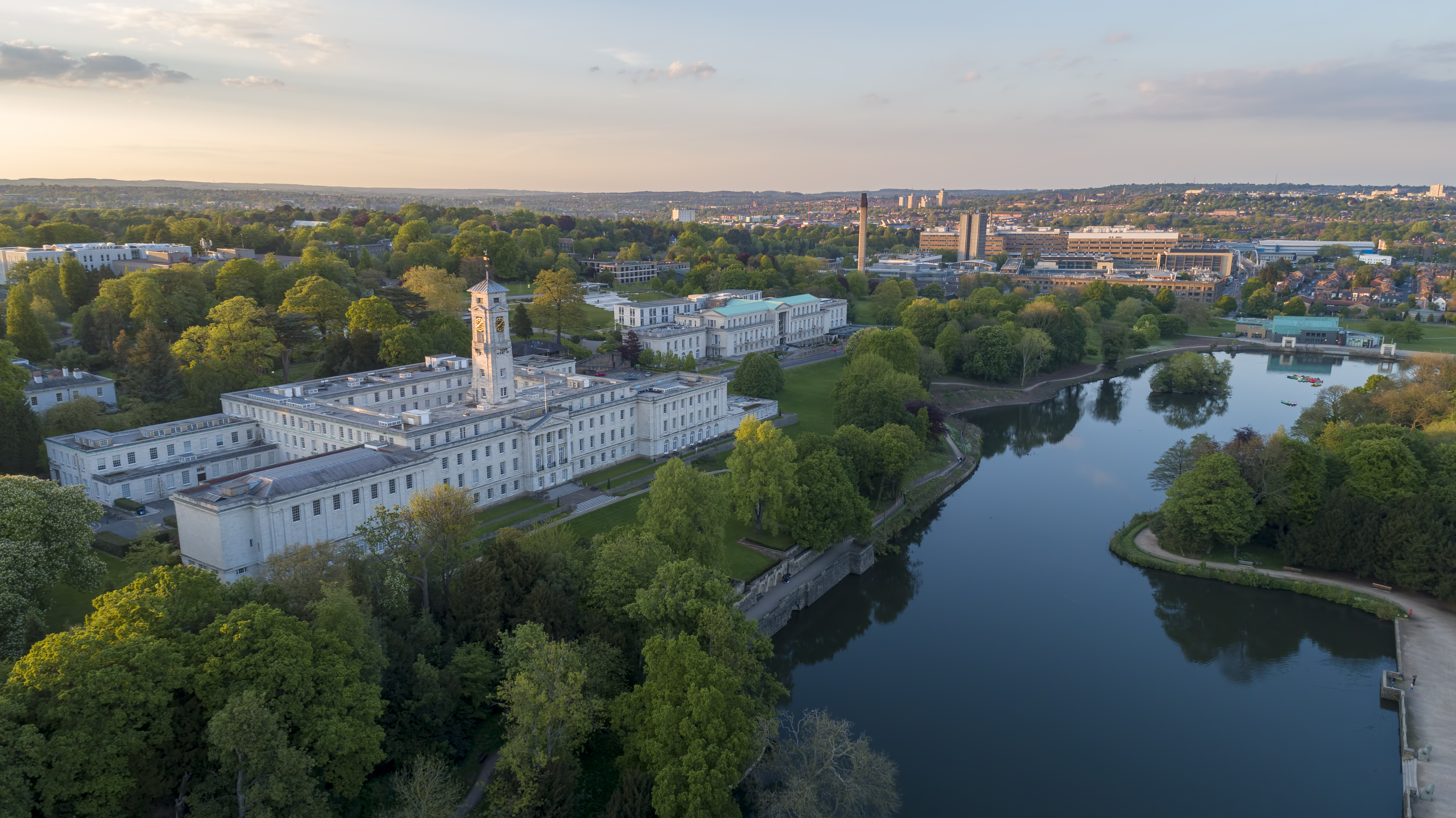
An aerial view of University Park, featuring the boating lake.

University Park Campus, to the west of Nottingham city centre, is the 330-acre (1.3 km^{2}) main campus of the University of Nottingham. Set around its lake and clock-tower and with extensive parkland greenery, University Park has won several awards for its architecture and landscaping, and was claimed to be the greenest campus in the country in 2009 after winning seven Green Flag Awards.

At the south entrance to the main campus, in Highfields Park, lies the Lakeside Arts Centre, the university's public arts facility and performance space. The D.H. Lawrence Pavilion houses a range of cultural facilities, including a 225 capacity theatre space, a series of craft cabinets, the Weston Gallery (which displays the university's manuscript collection), the Wallner gallery, which exists as a platform for local and regional artists, and a series of visual arts, performance and hospitality spaces. Other nearby facilities include the Djanogly Art Gallery, Recital Hall and Theatre, which in the past have hosted recordings and broadcasts by BBC Radio 3, local community theatre partnerships, contemporary art exhibitions, and cultural festivals.

==== Jubilee Campus ====
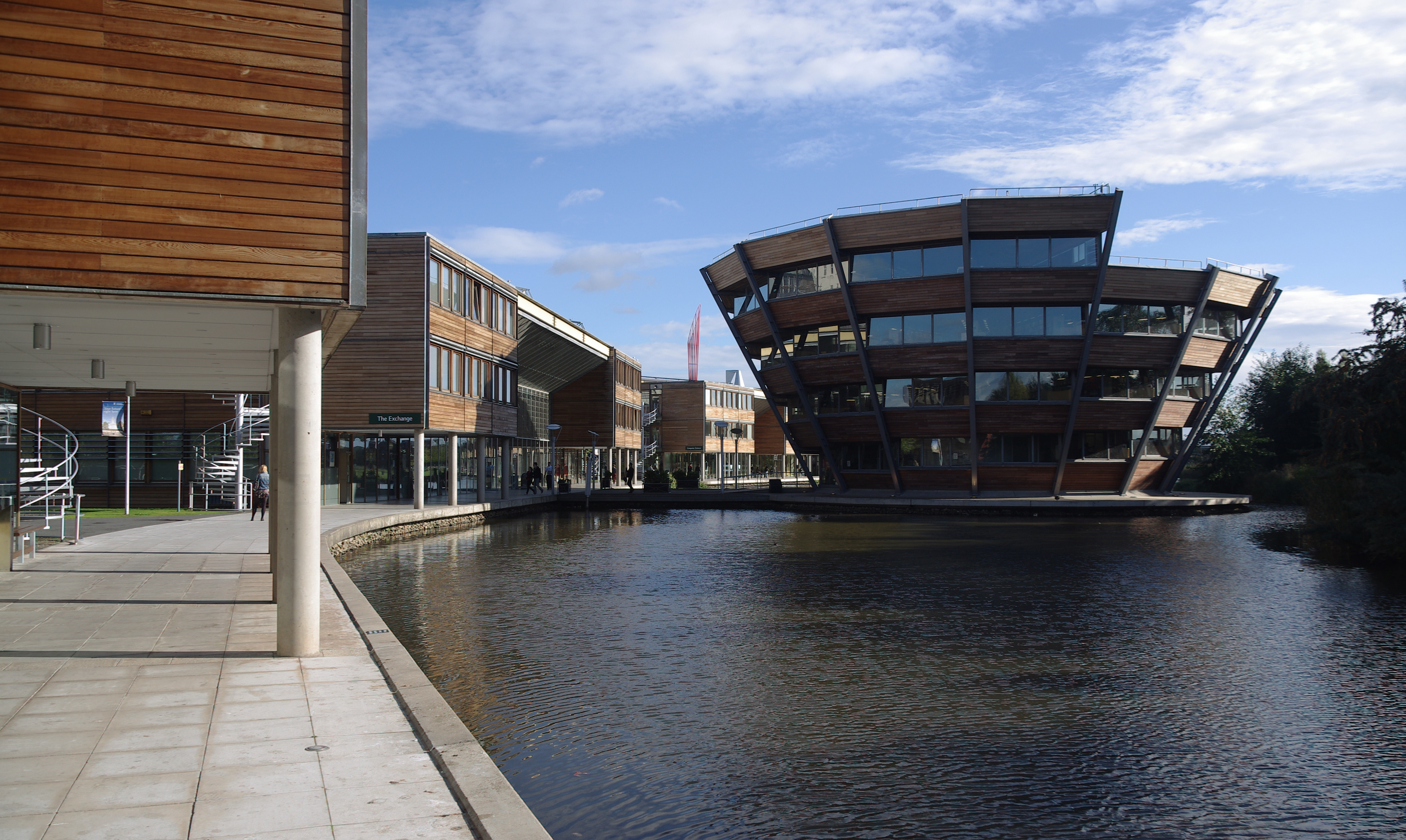
The Sir Harry and Lady Djanogly Learning Resource Centre on the Jubilee Campus

The Jubilee Campus, designed by Sir Michael Hopkins, was opened by Queen Elizabeth II in 1999, and is approximately 1 mile (1.6 km) from University Park. The campus houses the schools of education and computer science, along with the Nottingham University Business School. The site is also the home of the National College for School Leadership. A second building for the business school was opened by Lord Sainsbury in 2004.

The environmentally friendly nature of the campus and its buildings have been a factor in the awards that it has received, including the Millennium Marque Award for Environmental Excellence, the British Construction Industry Building Project of the Year, the RIBA Journal Sustainability Award, and the Civic Trust Award for Sustainability. The Jubilee Campus was also commended by the Energy Globe Award judges in 2005. The GlaxoSmithKline Carbon Neutral Laboratory is part of the university's school of chemistry and was the UK's first carbon neutral laboratory. On 12 September 2014 a large fire broke out during its construction, resulting in the official opening being delayed until 2017.

The campus is distinct for its modern architecture, culminating in Aspire, a 60-metre (200 ft) tall artistic structure that was the tallest freestanding work of art in the UK. However, not all of the buildings have been well received, with the Amenities Building and YANG Fujia Building being labelled the second worst new architectural design in Britain in the 2009 Carbuncle Cup.

==== Other campuses ====
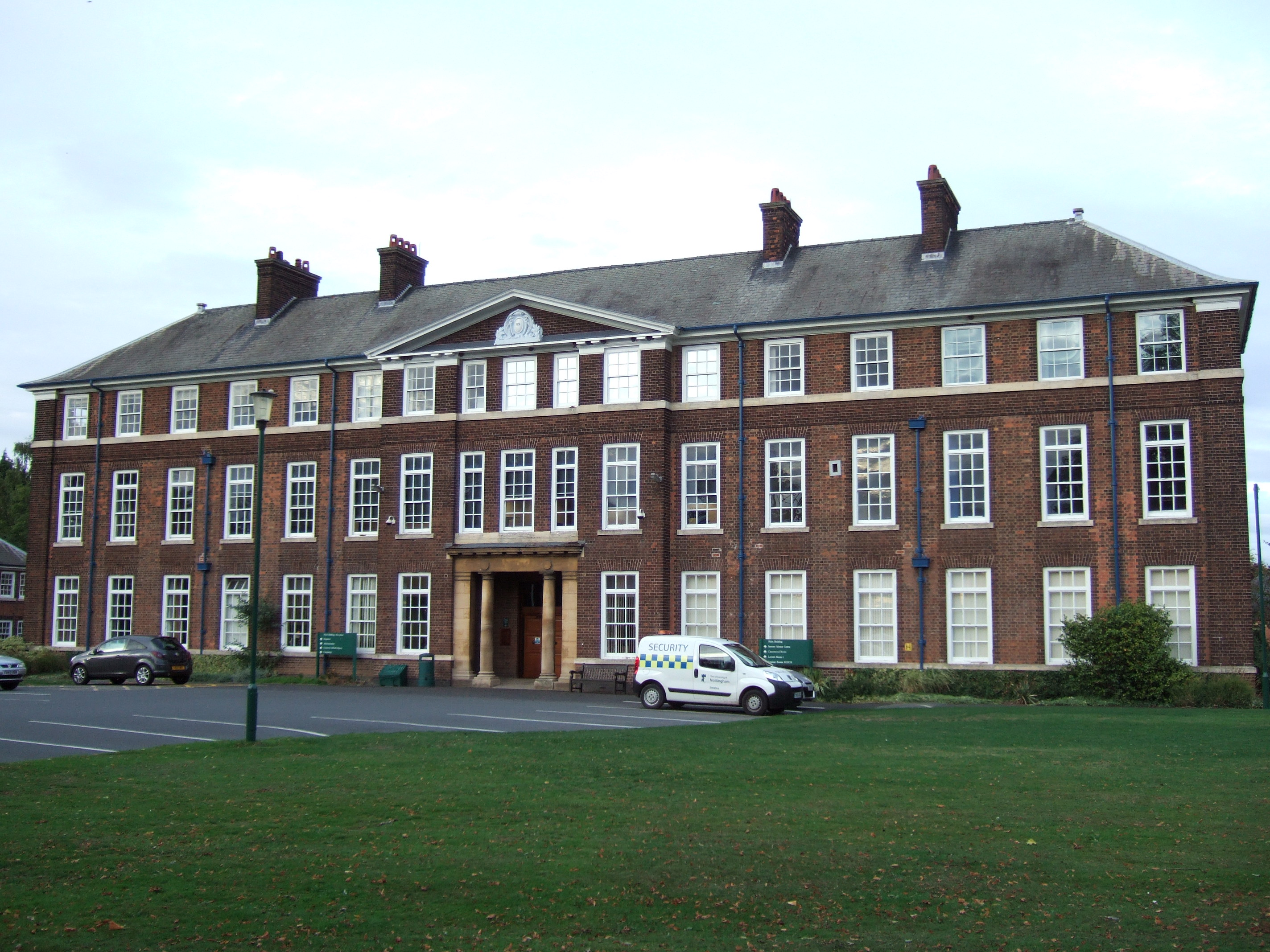
The former Midland Agricultural College on the Sutton Bonington Campus

The medical school is based at the Queen's Medical Centre, adjacent to University Park and linked to it by a footbridge. The medical school also has sites at the Royal Derby Hospital and Nottingham City Hospital.

Sutton Bonington Campus, about 12 miles (19 km) south of Nottingham, houses the school of biosciences, the school of veterinary medicine, and the main site of the university farm. In addition to 221 hectares (550 acres) in Sutton Bonington, the farm also has a 160-hectare (400-acre) site at Bunny Park and a 65-hectare (160-acre) site at Clifton.

King's Meadow Campus was established in 2005 on the former Central Independent Television Studios site on Lenton Lane. In February 2025, the university announced its intention to sell the campus. It formerly accommodated administrative departments, most of which have now been transferred to other campuses. It is also the location of Manuscripts and Special Collections, which remains on the campus. A functioning television studio remains at the site, that continues to be rented to the film and television industry.

Castle Meadow Campus is a 3.75-hectare site below Nottingham Castle, purchased by the university in 2021, having been previously owned by HMRC (HM Revenue and Customs). Existing buildings are to be refurbished with the campus planned to open from 2023. In November 2025, the university announced plans to sell the campus.

==== Halls of residence ====
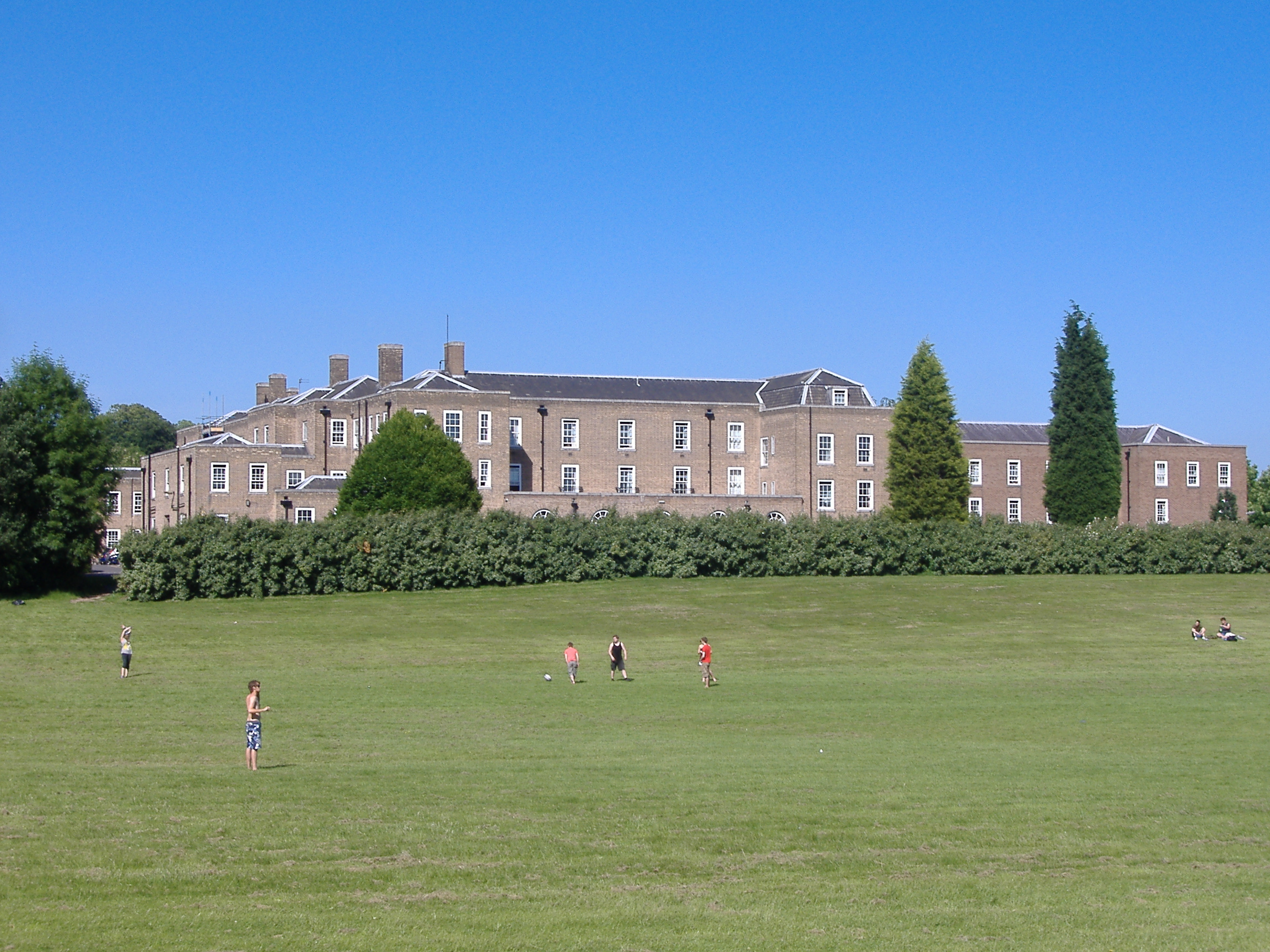
Florence Boot Hall, the oldest hall of residence at the university

The university has a number of halls of residence, both on-campus and nearby. The on-campus halls at the University Park campus are catered, except for the University Park townhouses, but there are self-catered halls nearby. The Jubilee campus has only self-catered halls, both on-campus and nearby, while the Sutton Bonington campus has a single self-catered hall located on the campus.

With the exception of Dagfa House at the University Park campus, the off-campus halls are owned by private providers operating in partnership with the university rather than by the university itself. Ownership of some off-campus halls near the University Park campus was transferred to UPP, who added new-build accommodation and reopened the halls under its management in 2003.

==== Sport facilities ====
The David Ross Sports Village is a multi-sport facility on the University Park campus. Indoor facilities include a 25m swimming pool and a 20-court sports hall, while outdoor facilities include netball and tennis courts and a 3G rubber crumb pitch.

The Highfields Sports Complex, adjacent to the University Park campus, has outdoor facilities for football, rugby, hockey and beach volleyball.

=== International campuses ===
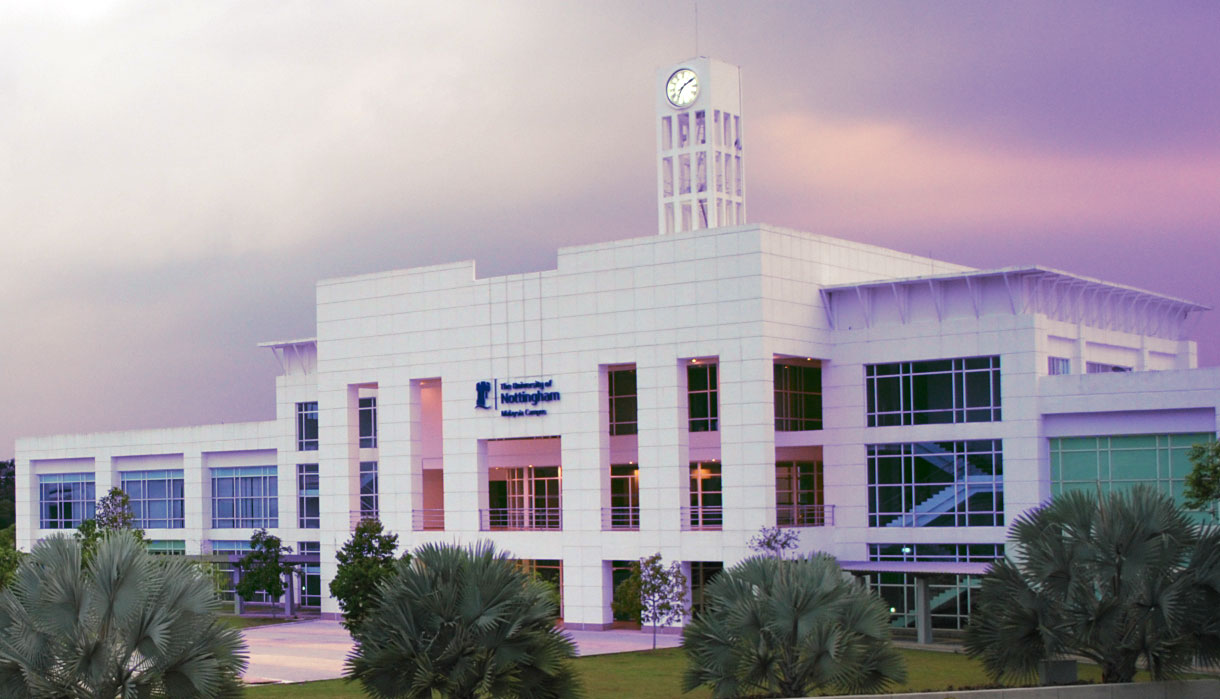
The campus in Semenyih, Malaysia.

Nottingham established its first international campus in 2000 in Malaysia. In 2005, this moved to a purpose-built 101-acre (41 ha) site in Semenyih, 19 miles (30 km) south of Kuala Lumpur. The Malaysia campus received the Queen's Award for Enterprise in 2001 and the Queen's Award for Industry in 2006.

Accommodation is available on the Malaysia campus in two student villages, Student Village North and Student Village South. These have single, two-person and four-person rooms, and pantries where light cooking of halal food is allowed. There are also on-campus convenience stores and food outlets.

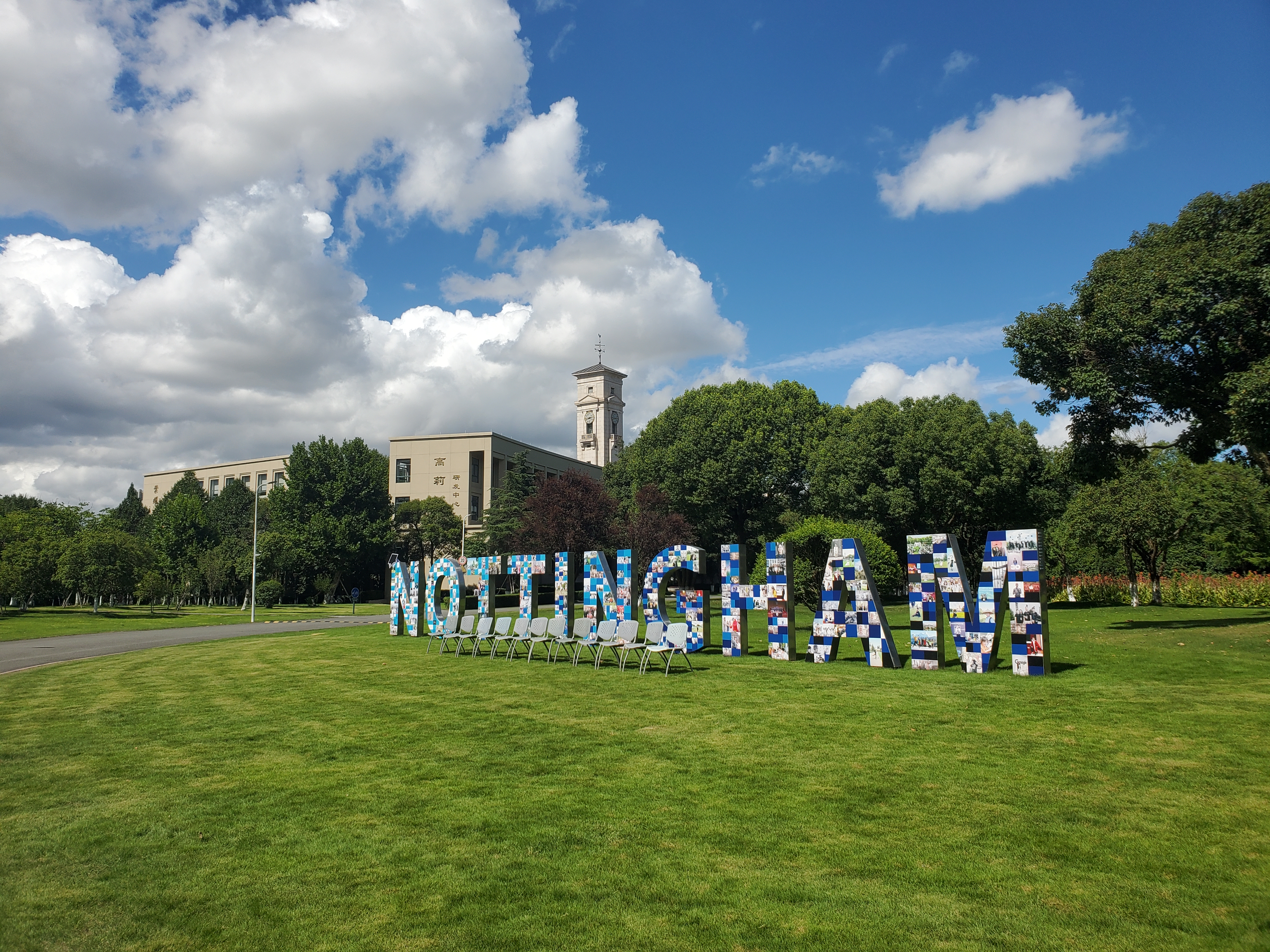
The university's campus in Ningbo, China, showing the replica of the university's Trent Building

In 2004, Nottingham established is second international campus in Ningbo, Zhejiang Province, China. The Ningbo campus was officially opened by John Prescott, the UK's Deputy Prime Minister, in February 2006. The Ningbo Campus takes design cues from Nottingham's University Park campus and includes its own version of Nottingham's famous Trent Building.

Accommodation on the Ningbo campus is in halls of residence with four-person rooms, mainly for first year undergraduate students, two-person bunk-bed rooms in four-room suites, single rooms in four-room suites for senior students, and single suites for postgraduate and international students. The campus has convenience stores, fast food outlets and other shops on the "High Street".

Both international campuses are under the charge of a provost and pro-vice-chancellor.

== Organisation and administration ==
=== Faculties and departments ===
The university is divided between the main university in the UK, the Malaysia campus, and the China campus. Each of these is divided into faculties and further divided into schools and departments.

==== UK campuses ====
The University of Nottingham in the UK has a number of schools and departments organised into five faculties: arts; engineering; medicine and health sciences; science; and social science. Each faculty is divided into schools or departments, and some schools in the faculty of arts are further subdivided into departments, as shown below:

Faculty of arts

- School of cultures, languages and area studies, comprising the departments of American and Canadian studies; cultural, media and visual studies; and modern languages and cultures
- School of English
- School of humanities, comprising the departments of classics and archaeology; foundation arts; history; music; and philosophy
- Liberal arts (interdisciplinary degree programme)

Faculty of engineering

- Department of architecture and built environment
- Department of chemical and environmental engineering
- Department of civil engineering
- Department of electrical and electronic engineering
- Department of foundation engineering and physical sciences
- Department of mechanical, materials and manufacturing engineering

Faculty of medicine and health sciences

- School of health sciences
- School of life sciences
- School of medicine
- School of veterinary medicine and science

Faculty of science

- School of biosciences
- School of chemistry
- School of computer science
- School of mathematical sciences
- School of pharmacy
- School of physics and astronomy
- School of psychology

Faculty of social sciences

- School of economics
- School of education
- School of geography
- School of law
- Nottingham University Business School
- School of politics and international relations
- School of sociology and social policy

==== Malaysia campus ====
The Malaysia campus has two faculties: the faculty of arts and social sciences and the faculty of science and engineering.

==== China campus ====
The China campus has three facilities: the Nottingham University Business School China, the faculty of humanities and social sciences, and the faculty of science and engineering.

=== Governance ===
The head of the university is the chancellor, appointed by the university council. The principal academic and administrative officer of the university is the president and vice-chancellor, assisted by the provost and deputy vice-chancellor, the provost and pro-vice-chancellor for each of the China and Malaysia campuses, and a number of other pro-vice-chancellors and chief officers, who together form the university executive board and have responsibility for the day-to-day running of the university. As of December 2025, the vice-chancellor is Jane Norman, who took up the post in January 2025.

The governing body is the university council, which has 25 members, 14 of whom come from outside the university. The academic authority is the senate, consisting of senior academics (including all heads of schools and deans of faculties) and elected staff and student representatives. The visitor is the monarch, acting through the Lord President of the Council.

=== Finances ===
In the financial year ending 31 July 2025, Nottingham had a total group income (including its 37.5% share of the University of Nottingham Ningbo and its 29.9% share of the University of Nottingham Malaysia) of £863.1 million (2023/24 – £849.4 million) and an income for the university alone of £845.0 million (2023/24 – £834.7 million). It had a total group expenditure of £947.4 million (2023/24 – £627.8 million) an expenditure for the university alone of £924.2 million (2023/24 – £615.3 million). This gave an overall deficit for the group of £76.8 million (2023/24 surplus of £220.7 million) and for the university alone of £71.5 million (2024/24 – surplus of £220.1 million). The 2024/25 expenditure included an impairment of £74.8 million from revaluation of the Castle Meadow and King's Meadow campuses and restructuring costs of £11.3 million, while the 2023/24 expenditure included £-243.6 million from changes in pension liabilities and restructuring costs of £13.8 million. The accounts also reported that the adjusted deficit was £85.3 million (2023/24 – £17.0 million); this included the impairment and restructuring costs but not changes in pension liabilities and other losses or gains. Jane Norman, the vice-chancellor of the university, told the Nottingham Post that the university had moved "from an underlying deficit position of -£3.2 million in 2024 to a small underlying surplus position of £0.8 million in 2025".

Sources of income included £453.1 million from tuition fees and education contracts (2023/25 – £437.5 million), £118.1 million from funding body grants (2023/24 – £120.7 million), £140.4 million from research grants and contracts (2023/24 – £141.6 million), £3.6 million in investment income (2023/24 – £3.5 million), £1.9 million from donations and endowments (2022/23 – £4.2 million), and £145.0 million in other operating income (2023/24 – £142.2 million). On 31 July 2025, Nottingham had endowments of £82.5 million (2024 – £78.1 million). The total net assets of the group were £761.0 million (2024 – £835.9 million), while the net assets of the university alone were £713.9 million (2024 – £783.5 million).

== Academic profile ==
=== Research ===
The university is a member of the Russell Group of research-led British universities, the international Universitas 21 association of research-intensive universities, and the Midlands Innovation regional research and innovation partnership.

In the 2021 Research Excellence Framework, which assessed the quality of research in UK higher education institutions, Nottingham was ranked joint 25th by GPA and 7th for research power (the grade point average score of a university, multiplied by the full-time equivalent number of researchers submitted) in analysis of the results by Times Higher Education.

=== Admissions ===
UCAS admission statistics
	2025	2024	2023	2022	2021
Applications (Note: Main scheme applications, International and UK)	55,485	52,165	56,890	57,570	55,375
Accepted	8,610	8,925	7,655	8,425	8,710
Application/acceptence ratio	6.4	5.8	7.4	6.8	6.4
Overall offer rate (%)	74.3	68.9	69.9	67.4	71.9
↳ UK only (%) (Note: UK domiciled applicants)	76.0	70.3	71.2	67.8	71.9
Average Entry Tariff	—N/a	—N/a	141	154	154
↳ Top three exams (Note: The maximum tariff score for three exams is 168: the equivalent of A*A*A* at A-Level, 777 at HL for the IB Diploma Programme, or AAA at Advanced Higher)	—N/a	—N/a	143.2	146.2	146.1

HESA student body composition (2024/25)
Domicile and Ethnicity	Total
British White (Note: Not be confused solely with White British)	49%
British Ethnic Minorities (Note: Includes those who indicate that they identify as Asian, Black, Mixed Heritage, Arab or any other ethnicity except White.)	29%
International EU	1%
International Non-EU	21%
Undergraduate Widening Participation Indicators
Female	53%
Independent school	19%
Low Participation Areas (Note: Calculated from the Polar4 measure, using Quintile1, in England and Wales. Calculated from the Scottish Index of Multiple Deprivation (SIMD) measure, using SIMD20, in Scotland.)	9%

According to the latest statistics (2024/25) compiled by the Higher Education Statistics Agency (HESA), Nottingham is the UK's 9th largest university based on total student enrolment with 34,840 students. The university is consistently designated as a 'high-tariff' institution by the Department for Education, with the average undergraduate entrant to the university in recent years amassing between 143–146 UCAS Tariff points in their top three pre-university qualifications – the equivalent of AAA at A-Level. Based on 2022/23 HESA entry standards data published in domestic league tables, which include a broad range of qualifications beyond the top three exam grades, the average student at the University of Nottingham achieved 154 points. The university gave offers of admission to 70.1% of its undergraduate applicants in 2024.

In 2016/17, 20% of Nottingham's undergraduates were privately educated, the 17th highest proportion among mainstream British universities. In the 2023/24 academic year, the university had a domicile breakdown of 78:2:20 of UK:EU:non-EU students respectively with a female to male ratio of 56:44.

=== Reputation and rankings ===
Rankings
National rankings
- Complete (2027): 26=
- Guardian (2027): 51
- Times / Sunday Times (2027): 24

Global rankings
- ARWU (2026): 101–150
- QS (2027): 97
- THE (2026): 136=

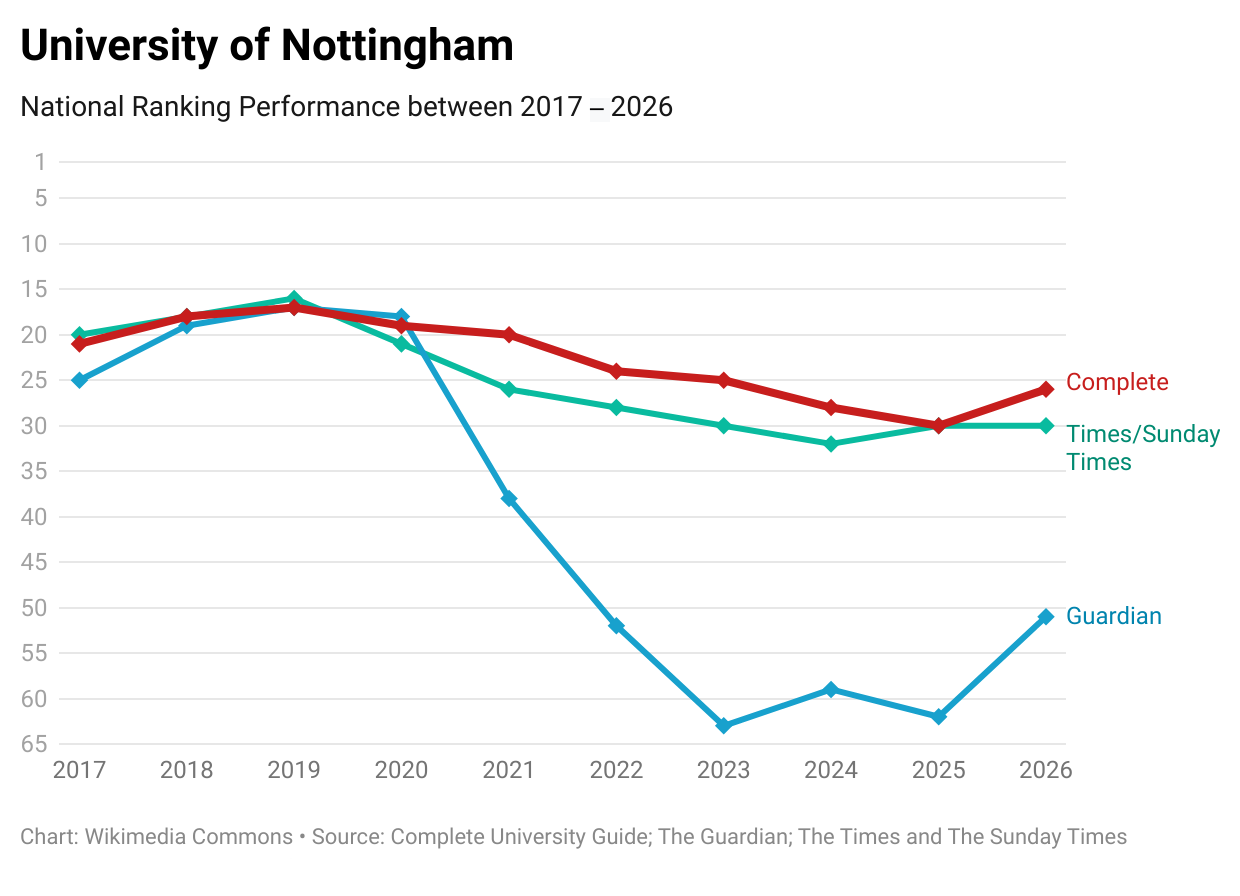
University of Nottingham's national league table performance over the past ten years

The university was named Times Higher Education "University of the Year" in 2006 and Times Higher Education "Entrepreneurial University of the Year" in 2008. It has been awarded two Queen's Anniversary Prizes (2000 and 2011) and one Queen Elizabeth Prize for Education (2025).

In national rankings, Nottingham was ranked joint 26th by the Complete University Guide for 2026, 51st by the Guardian University Guide for 2026, and 30th by the Times and Sunday Times Good University Guide for 2026. Internationally, it was ranked 97th by the 2026 QS World University Rankings, in the 101–150 band by the 2025 Shanghai Ranking Consultancy Academic Ranking of World Universities, and joint 136th by the 2026 Times Higher Education World University Rankings.

The High Fliers Research UK graduate market report for 2026 placed Nottingham third in its table of universities targeted by the largest number of top employees.

== Student life ==
=== Students' union ===
The University of Nottingham Students' Union is the students' union of the university and is based in the university's Portland Building. It has more than 200 affiliated student societies and 70 sports clubs.

The students' union publishes the magazine Impact five times a year. It also has a radio station, University Radio Nottingham. and manages the Nottingham New Theatre. The union's rag, "Karnival" (abbreviated to "Karni") set a European record for fundraising by a student-run group in 2012, raising £1.6 million for charity. The students' union also has a branch of the international volunteering charity, InterVol, which places student volunteers locally and internationally.

=== Sports ===
Nottingham has a strong reputation for sport and was named the Times and Sunday Times sports university of the year for 2019, 2021 and 2024.

In addition to competing in national British Universities and Colleges Sport competitions, Nottingham also participates in the annual Varsity Series, a multi-sport series between Nottingham University and local rivals Nottingham Trent University.

Nottingham also has an extensive intramural sport programme, with 4,000 students playing on teams representing halls, courses, societies and groups of friends. Nottingham intramural teams compete against Loughborough Hall Sports teams in the annual IMS Varsity. There are specific "Hall Sports Leagues" in football and netball for teams from university-owned halls of residence.

=== Residential life ===
Nottingham historically had junior common room committees (elected from the student body) that organised social events for residents of university halls. However, as of 2025, social events in University of Nottingham halls of residence are instead organised by the university's residential experience team. The university's community engagement team supports students living off-campus in purpose built student accommodation or in private rental properties.

== Notable people ==
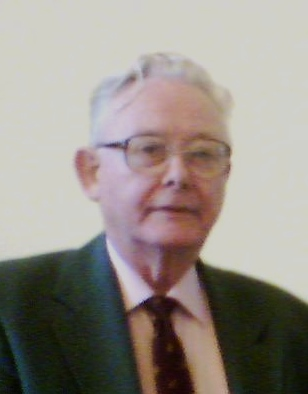
Sir Peter Mansfield, physicist who was awarded the 2003 Nobel Prize in Physiology or Medicine

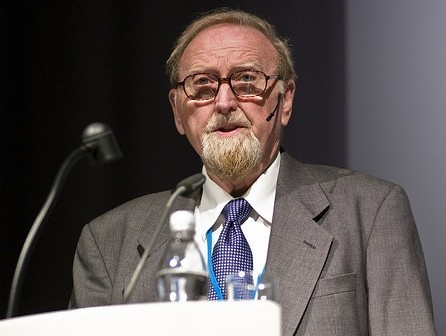
Sir Clive Granger, economist awarded the 2003 Nobel Memorial Prize in Economic Sciences

The university has been associated with a range of notable alumni and staff in a number of disciplines: Nobel Prize or Fields Medal winners include Sir Clive Granger – 2003 Nobel Memorial Prize in Economic Sciences, Sir Peter Mansfield – 2003 Nobel Prize in Physiology or Medicine for contributions to Magnetic Resonance Imaging, Andre Geim – 2010 Nobel Prize in Physics for the discovery of graphene, and Caucher Birkar – 2018 Fields Medal "for his proof of the boundedness of fano varieties and for contributions to the minimal model program".

Frederick Kipping, professor of chemistry (1897–1936), made the discovery of silicone polymers at Nottingham. Nottingham professor Angus Wallace refined the brace position used in aircraft following the 1989 Kegworth air disaster. In 2015, the Assemble collective, of which the part-time Architecture Department tutor Joseph Halligan is a member, won the Turner Prize for art.

== See also ==
- Academic dress of the University of Nottingham
- Armorial of UK universities
- International Trade Awards (2007)
- List of modern universities in Europe (1801–1945)
- List of universities in the UK

== Bibliography ==
- Fawcett, Peter and Neil Jackson (1998). Campus critique: the architecture of the University of Nottingham. Nottingham: University of Nottingham.
- Tolley, B. H. (2001). The history of the University of Nottingham. Nottingham: Nottingham University Press.
- Derek Winterbottom, Bertrand Hallward: First Vice-Chancellor of the University of Nottingham, 1948-1965. A Biography (The University of Nottingham, Nottingham, 1995)
