= Daniel Nexon =

American political scientist

- Born: April 7, 1973

Academic background
- Education: Harvard University (BA); Columbia University (MA, MPhil, PhD)

Academic work
- Discipline: Political science
- Institutions: Georgetown University

Daniel H. Nexon (born April 7, 1973) is an American political scientist currently serving as a professor in the School of Foreign Service and the Department of Government at Georgetown University. His first book, The Struggle for Power in Early Modern Europe: Religious Conflict, Dynastic Empires, and International Change, won the 2010 International Security Studies Section of the International Studies Association Book Award. Nexon has received several prestigious fellowships and awards. In 2009 and 2010 Nexon received an International Affairs Fellowship from the Council on Foreign Relations. He served his fellowship in the Office of the Secretary of Defense (Policy) in the Russia/Ukraine/Eurasia regional office. In 2012, the Social Science Research Council recognized Nexon as an important "new voice" in international affairs.

He was the editor-in-chief of International Studies Quarterly from 2014 to 2018.

== Early life and education ==
Nexon grew up in Washington, DC, and attended the Georgetown Day School. While in high school, he participated in policy debate and was a nationally ranked competitor. His senior year, he and his debate partner, Rebecca Tushnet, reached the finals of the Tournament of Champions. Nexon then attended Harvard University, where he briefly debated and also wrote for the Harvard International Review. He graduated with a B.A. in 1995.

Nexon began a Ph.D. program in political science at Columbia University in 1995. He received his M.A. and M.Phil. before graduating with a Ph.D. in 2004. While in graduate school, he began collaborating on a series of papers with Patrick Jackson exploring the role of ideas in international politics. Their papers, part of a theoretical school described as constructivism, have led them both to be placed on lists of notable constructivists.

== Academic career ==
Nexon is primarily known for two areas of his research. First, Nexon is one of the most preeminent experts on the relationship between religion and international politics. His first book, The Struggle for Power in Early Modern Europe: Religious Conflict, Dynastic Empires, and International Change explores the way the Protestant Reformation affected religious networks and polities in Europe.

Second, Nexon also engages in research designed to link together the study of international politics with important elements of western culture such as Harry Potter. Nexon has been quoted in newspapers, magazines, and television for his collaborative studies on the intersection between the Harry Potter series and international affairs. In the 2007 Time story on woman of the year J.K. Rowling, Nexon stated that "for people articulating concerns about globalization in their cultural setting. It's incredibly significant that Potter even enters these debates." Nexon co-edited a volume titled Harry Potter and International Relations, published in 2006, that applies international relations theorizing to the world of Harry Potter and the politics of Harry Potter in general.

In 2020, he co-wrote Exit From Hegemony: The Unraveling of the American Global Order with Alexander Cooley.

Nexon also founded and helps maintain The Duck of Minerva, an academic international-relations weblog.

== Books ==
- Exit From Hegemony: The Unraveling of the American Global Order. (2020).
- Nexon, Daniel H. (April 20, 2009). The Struggle for Power in Early Modern Europe: Religious Conflict, Dynastic Empires, and International Change. Princeton, NJ: Princeton University Press. ISBN 9780691137933.
- Nexon, Daniel H.; Neumann, Iver B., eds. (May 2006). Harry Potter and International Relations. Lanham, Maryland: Rowman and Littlefield. ISBN 978-0-7425-3959-4.

== Journal articles ==
- "Hegemonic-order theory: A field-theoretic account". (co-authored with Iver Neumann). European Journal of International Relations (2017).
- "Paradigmatic Faults in International Relations Theory". (co-authored with Patrick Thaddeus Jackson). International Studies Quarterly 53.4 (2009)
- "The Balance of Power in the Balance". World Politics 61.2 (April 2009), p 330 - 359.
- "What's This, Then? 'Romanes Eunt Domus'?". International Studies Perspectives 9.3 (2008)
- "What's at Stake in the American Empire Debate". (co-authored with Thomas Wright). American Political Science Review 101.2 (2007)
- "Paradigm Lost? Structural Realism and Structural Functionalism". (co-authored with Stacie E. Goddard). European Journal of International Relations 10.1 (2005)
- "Zeitgeist? Neo-idealism and International Political Change". Review of International Political Economy 12.4 (2005)
- "Constructivist Realism or Realist-Constructivism?". (co-authored with Patrick Thaddeus Jackson). International Studies Review 2.6 (2004)
- "Which Historical Sociology?". Review of International Studies 27.2 (2001)
- "Whence Causal Mechanisms? A Comment on Legro". (co-authored with Patrick Thaddeus Jackson). Dialogue IO 1.1 (2001)
- "Relations before States: Substance, Process, and the Study of World Politics". (co-authored with Patrick Thaddeus Jackson). European Journal of International Relations 5.3 (1999)
