= List of international relations journals =

The following list of scholarly journals in international relations contains notable English-language academic journals on international relations. It is not comprehensive, as there are hundreds currently published. Popular magazines or other publications related to international relations (of which there are also many) are not listed.

== A ==
- American Journal of International Law
- American Journal of Political Science
- American Political Science Review
- Annual Review of Political Science
- Australian Journal of International Affairs

== B ==
- British Journal of Politics and International Relations
- Bulletin of the Atomic Scientists

== C ==
- Cambridge Review of International Affairs
- Chinese Journal of International Politics
- Conflict Management and Peace Science
- Cooperation and Conflict

== E ==
- East European Politics
- European Journal of International Law
- European Journal of International Relations
- European Journal of International Security
- European Union Politics

== F ==
- Fletcher Forum of World Affairs
- Foreign Affairs
- Foreign Policy Analysis

== G ==
- Georgetown Journal of International Affairs
- Global Change, Peace & Security
- Global Governance
- Global Policy

== H ==
- Harvard International Review

== I ==
- International Affairs
- International Feminist Journal of Politics
- International Journal of Conflict and Violence
- International Journal of Transitional Justice
- International Organization
- International Political Sociology
- International Relations
- International Relations of the Asia-Pacific
- International Security
- International Studies
- International Studies Perspectives
- International Studies Quarterly
- International Studies Review
- International Theory
- Israel Journal of Foreign Affairs

== J ==
- Journal of Common Market Studies
- Journal of Conflict Resolution
- Journal of European Integration
- Journal of European Public Policy
- Journal of Global Security Studies
- Journal of International Affairs
- Journal of Peace Research
- Journal of Politics
- Journal of Strategic Studies

== M ==
- Marine Policy
- Mediterranean Politics
- Millennium: Journal of International Studies

== N ==
- New Political Economy

== O ==
- Orbis

== P ==
- Perspectives on Politics
- Political Science Quarterly

== R ==
- Review of International Organizations
- Review of International Political Economy
- Review of International Studies
- Review of World Economics

== S ==
- SAIS Review
- Security Dialogue
- Security Studies
- Survival

== T ==
- Terrorism and Political Violence

== W ==
- West European Politics
- World Economy
- World Politics

== Y ==
- Yale Journal of International Affairs
