= Gerasimos Tsourapas =

Academic

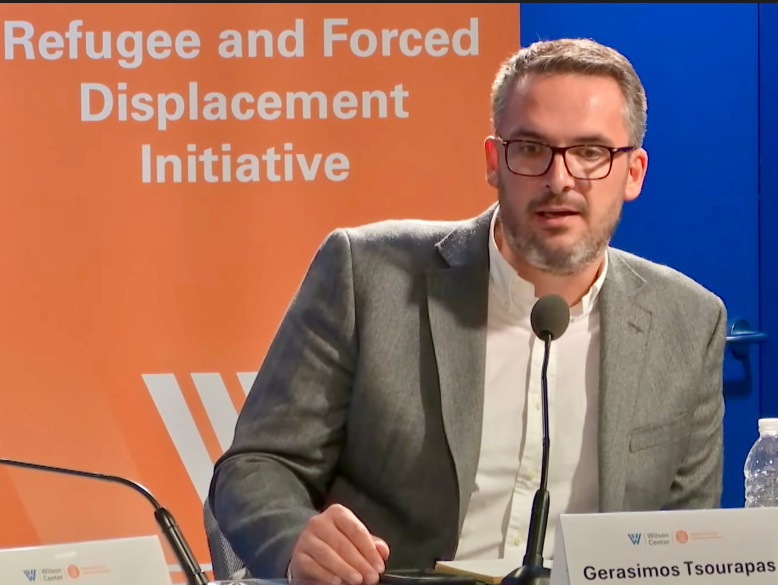
- Tsourapas at the Wilson Center in 2023
- Born: 1982 (age 43–44)
- Title: Editor-in-Chief, Migration Studies

Academic background
- Education: Yale University (2006); London School of Economics and Political Science (MSc, 2007); SOAS, University of London (PhD, 2016)
- Doctoral advisor: Laleh Khalili, Charles R. H. Tripp

Academic work
- Discipline: Political Science
- Main interests: migration diplomacy, refugees, diasporas, Middle East politics

Gerasimos Tsourapas FAcSS (born 1982) is 125th Anniversary Chair and Professor of International Relations at the University of Birmingham. He is Editor-in-chief of Migration Studies (Oxford University Press). His research examines the international relations of the Middle East and broader Global South, focusing on the politics of migrants, refugees, and diasporas. He has advanced the concepts of migration diplomacy, migration interdependence, and refugee rentierism to analyse the political economy and foreign policy dimensions of cross-border mobility.

Tsourapas is the author of The Politics of Migration in Modern Egypt: Strategies for Regime Survival in Autocracies, which was awarded the 2020 ENMISA Distinguished Book Award by the International Studies Association. His second book was entitled Migration Diplomacy in the Middle East and North Africa: Power, Mobility, and the State. He has received major research funding, including a European Research Council Starting Grant (2021), a British Academy Rising Star Engagement Award (2018), and a Carnegie Corporation of New York grant.

His research has informed policy debates and been cited in reports by the European Commission, the United States Congress, and the Parliamentary Assembly of the Council of Europe, among others, and has been featured in international media such as The New York Times, The Economist, the BBC, and TAZ (die tageszeitung) .

== Education ==
Tsourapas received an undergraduate degree in Economics and Political Science from Yale University (2006), where he compiled the history of the Yale Dramatic Association, as the organisation's archivist, in 2004. He went on to earn an MSc in International Political Economy from the London School of Economics and Political Science (2007). He completed his PhD in Politics at SOAS, University of London (2016). His thesis received the American Political Science Association's 2016 Best Dissertation Prize on Migration & Citizenship.

== Career ==
Tsourapas became 125th Anniversary Chair and Professor of International Relations at the University of Birmingham in 2025 and is also an Honorary Research Fellow at the University of Glasgow, where he held academic posts from 2021 to 2025, most recently as Professor of International Relations.

He was a Fellow at the Minda de Gunzburg Center for European Studies, Harvard University, in 2019–20. He served as a Visiting Professor at the London School of Economics and Political Science in 2024, and was a Distinguished Visiting Scholar at the Center for Migration and Refugee Studies at the American University in Cairo in 2024–25. He is currently a Senior Fellow at the Leir Institute for Migration and Human Security at Tufts University.

Tsourapas has held a number of elected positions in professional associations, including Chair of the Ethnicity, Nationalism, and Migration Studies Section of the International Studies Association (2023–25), and Treasurer of the Migration and Citizenship Section of the American Political Science Association (2017–19). He was also an elected Trustee of the Council for British Research in the Levant, a British Academy research institute (2019–22), where he served as Acting Honorary Treasurer and a member of the Research Sub-Committee.

== Awards ==
In 2015, Tsourapas received the Graduate Student Paper Prize of the Middle East Studies Association for his research on labor migration and state power during the Arab Cold War. The following year, his doctoral thesis was awarded the Best Dissertation Prize on Migration & Citizenship by the American Political Science Association. In 2017, he won the Martin O. Heisler Award of the International Studies Association for the best paper presented by a graduate student at its Annual Convention, for research on labor migration and coercive migration diplomacy in the Arab world. His first book, The Politics of Migration in Modern Egypt: Strategies for Regime Survival in Autocracies, received the 2020 Distinguished Book Award from the Ethnicity, Nationalism, and Migration Studies Section of the International Studies Association.

== Selected publications ==
=== Books ===
- Tsourapas, Gerasimos (2021). Migration Diplomacy in the Middle East and North Africa: Power, Mobility, and the State. Manchester: Manchester University Press. ISBN 978-1-5261-3209-3.
- Tsourapas, Gerasimos (2018). The Politics of Migration in Modern Egypt: Strategies for Regime Survival in Autocracies. Cambridge University Press. doi:10.1017/9781108630313. ISBN 978-1-108-63031-3.

=== Articles ===
- Fernández-Molina, Irene; Tsourapas, Gerasimos (2024). "Understanding Migration Power in International Studies". International Affairs. 100 (6): 2461–2479. doi:10.1093/ia/iiae230. hdl:10871/136643. ISSN 1468-2346.
- Sadiq, Kamal; Tsourapas, Gerasimos (2023). "The Transnational Social Contract in the Global South". International Studies Quarterly. 67 (4) sqad088. doi:10.1093/isq/sqad088. ISSN 0020-8833.
- Tsourapas, Gerasimos (2021). "Global Autocracies: Strategies of Transnational Repression, Legitimation, and Co-Optation in World Politics". International Studies Review. 23 (3): 616–644. doi:10.1093/isr/viaa061.
- Sadiq, Kamal; Tsourapas, Gerasimos (2021). "The Postcolonial Migration State". European Journal of International Relations. 27 (3): 884–912. doi:10.1177/13540661211000114. ISSN 1354-0661.
- Freier, Luisa F.; Micinski, Nicholas R.; Tsourapas, Gerasimos (2021). "Refugee Commodification: The Diffusion of Refugee Rent-Seeking in the Global South". Third World Quarterly. 42 (11): 2747–2766. doi:10.1080/01436597.2021.1956891. ISSN 0143-6597.
- Tsourapas, Gerasimos (2020). "The Long Arm of the Arab State". Ethnic and Racial Studies. 43 (2): 351–370. doi:10.1080/01419870.2019.1585558. ISSN 0141-9870.
- Adamson, Fiona B.; Tsourapas, Gerasimos (2020). "The Migration State in the Global South: Nationalizing, Developmental, and Neoliberal Models of Migration Management". International Migration Review. 54 (3): 853–882. doi:10.1177/0197918319879057. ISSN 0197-9183.
- Tsourapas, Gerasimos (2019). "The Syrian Refugee Crisis and Foreign Policy Decision-Making in Jordan, Lebanon, and Turkey". Journal of Global Security Studies. 4 (4): 464–481. doi:10.1093/jogss/ogz016.
- Adamson, Fiona B; Tsourapas, Gerasimos (2019). "Migration Diplomacy in World Politics". International Studies Perspectives. 20 (2): 113–128. doi:10.1093/isp/eky015.
- Tsourapas, Gerasimos (2018). "Labor Migrants as Political Leverage: Migration Interdependence and Coercion in the Mediterranean". International Studies Quarterly. 62 (2): 383–395. doi:10.1093/isq/sqx088.
