= Pascal Vennesson =

French political scientist

Pascal Vennesson is a French political scientist who studies war decision-making, strategic thought, international relations, and civil-military relations. He is a Senior Fellow and Head of Research at the S. Rajaratnam School of International Studies (RSIS) at Nanyang Technological University Singapore. He is also Professor of Political Science at Paris-Pantheon-Assas University (on leave).

He is the recipient of the Morris Janowitz Career Achievement Award from the Inter-University Seminar on Armed Forces and Society (IUS).

== Education ==
Pascal Vennesson received his MA from the University of Paris I Panthéon-Sorbonne and his Ph.D. from Sciences-Po Paris. He earned the agrégation de l'enseignement supérieur, a competitive examination for becoming a university professor in political science.

== Career ==
Vennesson was a post-doctoral fellow at Stanford University’s Center for International Security and Arms Control, at Ohio State University’s Mershon Center and a Centre National de la Recherche Scientifique (National Center for Scientific Research) Fellow at Harvard Kennedy School’s Belfer Center for Science and International Affairs.

Before joining the S. Rajaratnam School of International Studies (RSIS) at Nanyang Technological University Singapore, Vennesson held the Chair “Security in Europe”, at the European University Institute (Department of Social and Political Sciences and Robert Schuman Center for Advanced Studies). He also taught “Strategy and Policy” for ten years at The Paul H. Nitze School of Advanced International Studies (SAIS)-Bologna Center and “European Union’s Diplomacy, Security and Defense: Instruments and Common Policies” at the College of Europe.

From 1999 to 2003, he served in the French Ministry of Defence as the director of the Centre for Social Science Studies of Defence (C2SD), the predecessor organization of IRSEM. Pascal Vennesson is also a Commander Senior Grade (Hon.) in the French Navy Citizen Reserve. At RSIS, Vennesson is a Senior Fellow and Head of Research. He is also a lecturer at the Goh Keng Swee Command and Staff College.

In 2009 and 2010 he was a team member for the European Report on Development. Since 2013, he has been a council member for the Inter-University Seminar on Armed Forces and Society (IUS). He is a member of the editorial boards of Revue Française de Science Politique; Armed Forces and Society; the European Journal of International Security and International Politics and a member of the Executive Board of the American Political Science Association’s International Security Section (2025-2028).

In 2023, Inter-University Seminar on Armed Forces and Society (IUS) awarded Vennesson the Morris Janowitz Career Achievement Award, which is awarded by the IUS to a limited number of senior scholars whose careers most demonstrate excellence in the study of armed forces and society and important service to the discipline.

== Research and work ==
Vennesson’s research and teaching span international relations, decision-making, strategic studies, and military sociology. He is the author, co-author and editor of six books and his articles have been published in Security Studies, Journal of Strategic Studies, Journal of Global Security Studies, Armed Forces and Society, Review of International Studies, International Studies Perspectives, International Relations, Etudes Internationales and Revue Française de Science Politique. His edited volume ASEAN’s External Agreements: Law, Practice and the Quest for Collective Action (with Marise Cremona, David Kleimann, Joris Larik, and Rena Lee) examines ASEAN (the Association of Southeast Asian Nations) as an international actor and treaty‑maker, highlighting how its external agreements operate within international law.

His journal articles address the scope and epistemology of strategic studies, the politics of transparency and surveillance in war, and the relationship between tactics and civil–military relations. Examples include work on the Inchon landing decision and military judgment, the effects of transnational surveillance on warfare, and the links between civic engagement and the “new American way of war.”

Vennesson’s research in military sociology focuses on how changes in war, strategy, and military organization affect armed forces and their relationship with society. His work on “soldiers drawn into politics” analyzes how tactical practices in small wars and counterinsurgency can reshape civil–military relations, highlighting the political consequences of operational choices for military organizations and democratic control.

== Selected publications ==
- Vennesson, Pascal. “Institution and Airpower: The Making of the French Air Force.” Journal of Strategic Studies 18, no. 1 (1995): 37–67.
- Vennesson, Pascal. “Civil-Military Relations in France: Is There a Gap?” Journal of Strategic Studies 26, no. 2 (2003): 29–42. https://doi.org/10.1080/01402390412331302965
- Vennesson, Pascal. “Case Studies and Process Tracing: Theories and Practices.” In Approaches and Methodologies in the Social Sciences, 223–39. Cambridge University Press, 2008. https://doi.org/10.1017/CBO9780511801938.013
- Vennesson, Pascal, Fabian Breuer, Chiara de Franco, and Ursula C Schroeder. “Is There a European Way of War?: Role Conceptions, Organizational Frames, and the Utility of Force.” Armed Forces and Society 35, no. 4 (2009): 628–45. https://doi.org/10.1177/0095327X08317994
- Ruffa, Chiara, Christopher Dandeker, and Pascal Vennesson. “Soldiers Drawn into Politics? The Influence of Tactics in Civil-Military Relations.” Small Wars & Insurgencies 24, no. 2 (2013): 322–34. https://doi.org/10.1080/09592318.2013.778035
- Vennesson, Pascal. “Is Strategic Studies Narrow? Critical Security and the Misunderstood Scope of Strategy.” Journal of Strategic Studies 40, no. 3 (2017): 358–91.https://doi.org/10.1080/01402390.2017.1288108
- Vennesson Pascal, and Amanda Huan. “The General’s Intuition.” Armed Forces and Society 44, no. 3 (2018): 498–520. https://doi.org/10.1177/0095327X17738771
- Vennesson, Pascal, “Is Strategic Studies Rationalist, Materialist, and A-Critical? Reconnecting Security and Strategy,” Journal of Global Security Studies 5, no. 3 (2020): 494-510. https://doi.org/10.1093/jogss/ogz032
- He, Wendy, and Pascal Vennesson. “Getting Inside the Mind of Leaders and Advisers: A Data Collection Strategy for Historical Case Studies in IR.” International Studies Perspectives 26, no. 3 (2025): 356–76. https://doi.org/10.1093/isp/ekae017
