= Jennifer Sterling-Folker =

American political scientist

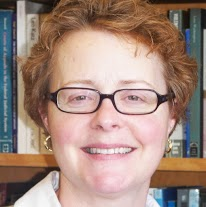
- Born: December 21, 1960 (age 65)
- Education: University of Chicago; University of New Hampshire
- Children: Katherine Folker
- Scientific career
- Fields: Political Science; International Relations
- Workplaces: University of Connecticut
- Website: Jennifer Sterling-Folker

Jennifer Sterling-Folker (born December 21, 1960) is a Professor of Political Science at the University of Connecticut. She was the Alan R. Bennett Honors Professor of Political Science. She is a specialist in International Relations theory.

== Biography ==
She received her M.A. and Ph.D. in political science from the University of Chicago, and a B.A. in political science and art history from the University of New Hampshire.

Sterling-Folker served as co-editor, along with Mark A. Boyer, of International Studies Review, a journal of the International Studies Association, and, along with Kimberly Hutchings, George Lawson, and Mathias Albert, of Review of International Studies, a journal of the British International Studies Association.

In her own research, Sterling-Folker has explored the lines between different schools of international relations theory such as constructivism and neoliberalism in international relations, also called neoliberal institutionalism; and realism and constructivism. She also led efforts to apply international relations theory to the 1999 conflict in Kosovo and 2003 U.S. led invasion of Iraq.

== Selected publications ==
Books

- Editor, Making Sense of International Relations Theory, second edition (Lynne Reinner Press, 2013).
- Theories of International Cooperation and the Primacy of Anarchy: Explaining U.S. International Monetary Policy-Making After Bretton Woods (SUNY Series in Global Politics, 2002).

Articles

- “All Hail to the Chief: Liberal IR Theory in the New World Order.” (2015) International Studies Perspective, vol. 16, no. 1 (February): 40-49. Contribution to a special symposium on "Diversity in IR Theory."
- “A Disagreeable Dinner Guest? Waltz and the Study of Global Governance.” (2014) Australian Journal of Political Science, vol. 49, no. 3 (August): 530-534. Prepared for inclusion in a special issue, “Waltz Today: Reflections on the Legacy of Kenneth N. Waltz.”
- “The Emperor Wore Cowboy Boots.” (2008) International Studies Perspective, vol. 9, no. 3 (August): 319-330.
- “Lamarckian With a Vengeance: Human Nature and American International Relations Theory.” (2006) Journal of International Relations and Development, vol. 9, no. 3 (September): 227-246.
- “Discourses of Power: Traversing the Realist-Postmodern Divide.” Co-author with Rosemary E. Shinko. (2005) Millennium: Journal of International Studies, Special Issue, vol.33, no. 3, (March): 637-664. Reprinted in Power in World Politics, editors Felix Berenskoetter and M. J. Williams (Routledge, 2007).
- "Realism and the Constructivist Challenge: Rejecting, Reconstructing, or Rereading." (2002) International Studies Review, vol. 4, no. 1 (Spring): 73-97.
- "Competing Paradigms or Birds of a Feather? Constructivism and Neoliberal Institutionalism Compared." (2000) International Studies Quarterly, vol. 44, no. 1 (March): 97-119.
- "Realist Environment, Liberal Process, and Domestic-Level Variables." (1997) International Studies Quarterly, vol. 41, no. 1 (March): 1-25.

Book chapters

- “Be Careful What You Wish For: Positivism and the Desire for Relevance in the American Study of IR.” In What’s the Point of International Relations?, Rorden Wilkinson, Jan Selby, and Synne Dyvik, eds. (Routledge, 2017).
- “Disciplining Human Nature: The Evolution of American Social Scientific Theorizing.” Co-author with Jason Charrette. In Man, Agency, and Beyond: The Evolution of Human Nature in International Relations, Daniel Jacobi and Annette Freyberg-Inan, eds. (Cambridge University Press, 2015).
- “Realism.” Co-author with Jason Charrette. In International Organization and Global Governance, Thomas G. Weiss & Rorden Wilkinson, eds. (Routledge, 2013).
- “Constructivism.” Co-author with Dina Badie. In The Routledge Handbook of American Foreign Policy, Steven Hook and Christopher Jones, eds. (Routledge, 2011).
- “Neoliberalism.” In International Relations Theory: Discipline and Diversity, Tim Dunne, Milja Kurki, and Steve Smith, eds., (Oxford University Press, 2010).
- "Realist Theorizing as Tradition: Forward Is As Forward Does.” In Rethinking Realism in International Relations: Between Tradition and Innovation, Annette Freyberg-Inan, Patrick James, and Ewan Harrison, eds. (Johns Hopkins University Press, 2009).
- “Neoclassical Realism and Identity: Peril Despite Profit Across the Taiwan Straits.” In Neoclassical Realism, the State, and Foreign Policy, Steven Lobell, Norrin M. Ripsman, and Jeffrey Taliaferro, eds. (Cambridge University Press, 2009).
- "Realist Global Governance: Revisiting Cave! hic dragones and Beyond." In World Orders and Rule Systems, Contending Perspectives on Global Governance, Matthew Hoffmann and Alice Ba, eds. (Routledge, 2005).
- "Conflict and the Nation-State: Magical Mirrors of Muggles and Refracted Images." Co-authored with Brian Folker. In Harry Potter in International Relations, Daniel Nexon and Iver B. Neumman, eds. (Rowman and Littlefield, 2006).
- "Evolutionary Tendencies in Realist and Liberal Theory". In Evolutionary Interpretations of World Politics, ed. William R. Thompson. (Routledge, 2001.)
- "Between a Rock and a Hard Place: ‘Assertive Multilateralism’ in Post-Cold War US Foreign Policy-Making." In After the End: Making U.S. Foreign Policy in the Post-Cold War World, ed. James M. Scott. (Duke University Press, 1998).
