= Daniel W. Drezner =

American journalist

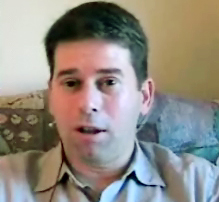
- Born: August 23, 1968 (age 58); Syracuse, New York, U.S.
- Education: Williams College (BA); Stanford University (MA, PhD)
- Occupations: political scientist, author, professor, journalist, blogger
- Spouse: Erika Drezner
- Children: 2
- Website: Official website

Daniel W. Drezner (born August 23, 1968) is an American political scientist. He is known for his scholarship and commentary on international relations and international political economy.

He is Distinguished Professor of International Politics and Academic Dean at The Fletcher School of Law and Diplomacy at Tufts University. He was previously in the department of political science at the University of Chicago as an assistant professor until 2006. He is a nonresident senior fellow at the Project on International Order and Strategy at the Brookings Institution.

Drezner co-hosts The Nation's "Space The Nation" podcast, which "looks at science fiction through the lens of political science". He authors Drezner's World at Substack.

== Early life and education ==
Born in 1968 to a religiously conservative Jewish household in Syracuse, New York, Drezner attended and is a graduate of a Hebrew high school as well as a secular high school. Drezner received a B.A. degree in political economy from Williams College in 1990. He received his M.A. and Ph.D. degrees from Stanford University, where his advisor was Stephen Krasner.

== Political views ==
Drezner rarely discusses his political loyalties, but in 2011 he wrote: "I find liberals write 'even conservative Dan Drezner...' while conservatives often deploy terms like 'academic elitist' or 'RINO'. In my case, at this point in time, I believe that last appellation to be entirely fair and accurate. I'm not a Democrat, and I don't think I've become more liberal over time."

Drezner supported the 2003 U.S. invasion of Iraq, writing that "a successful invasion not only eliminates the Iraqi threat, but over the long run it reduces the Arab resentment that feeds Al-Qaeda."

Drezner was a signatory to a March 2016 open letter by Republican national security community members that opposed Donald Trump as the Republican nominee for U.S. president. Drezner announced in July 2017 that he was no longer part of the Republican Party. In October 2017, he recommended resignation to Secretary of State Rex Tillerson.

== Books and commentary ==
Drezner has published columns, essays, and op-eds in many media outlets, including The New Republic, Foreign Affairs, Foreign Policy, The New York Times, Slate, Tech Central Station, and The Wall Street Journal. He has been a frequent guest on Bloggingheads.tv and various other broadcast media. He originally blogged on his website, DanielDrezner.com, but moved in January 2009 to become a contributing blogger at ForeignPolicy.com. Drezner then moved to The Washington Post in 2014, eventually leaving in 2022. He has moderated and spoken at various Council on Foreign Relations events.

Drezner's 2007 book, All Politics Is Global: Explaining International Regulatory Regimes, looked at international economic regulations and concluded that these were under the control of the most wealthy and powerful nations, as they had been in the past. G. John Ikenberry in Foreign Affairs comments: "His main contribution, however, is to explode a popular notion of globalization and thereby to set an agenda for the study of global regulatory politics. For social movements seeking to shape the governance of the world economy, all roads still lead to the state."

Drezner's 2011 book, Theories of International Politics and Zombies, speculated about different ways the international community might respond to a zombie outbreak, although he "concedes that the statistical probability of such an event is extremely difficult to determine but generally thought to be low". Oliver Stuenkel, writing in Post-Western World, commented: "Drezner's book is a must-read for young international relations scholars, considering the vast attention this topic is likely to get in the future."

Drezner's 2014 book, The System Worked: How the World Stopped Another Great Depression, examines the 2008 financial crisis. In it, Drezner praises the international response to the crisis and says that a major economic depression was averted. Jonathan Kirshner, in his review in Boston Review, said the book was "smart, thoughtful, and important" but disagreed with Drezner on the issues of free trade and globalization.

== Selected publications ==
=== Books ===
- Drezner, Daniel W. (2020). The Toddler in Chief: What Donald Trump Teaches Us about the Modern Presidency. Chicago: Chicago University Press. ISBN 9780226714257
- Drezner, Daniel W. (2017). The Ideas Industry: How Pessimists, Partisans, and Plutocrats are Transforming the Marketplace of Ideas. Oxford: Oxford University Press. ISBN 9780190264604.
- Drezner, Daniel W. (2014). The System Worked: How the world stopped another Great Depression. Oxford: Oxford University Press. ISBN 9780190263393.
- Drezner, Daniel W. (2011). Theories of International Politics and Zombies. Princeton, New Jersey: Princeton University Press. ISBN 9780691147833.
- Drezner, Daniel W. (2009). Avoiding Trivia: The role of strategic planning in American foreign policy. Washington, D.C.: Brookings Institution Press. ISBN 9780815703662.
- Drezner, Daniel W. (2008). All Politics is Global: Explaining international regulatory regimes. Princeton, New Jersey Woodstock: Princeton University Press. ISBN 9780691096421.
- Drezner, Daniel W. (2006). U.S. Trade Strategy: Free versus fair. New York Washington, D.C.: Council on Foreign Relations Distributed by Brookings Institution Press. ISBN 9780876093498.
- Drezner, Daniel W. (2003). Locating the Proper Authorities: The interaction of domestic and international institutions. Ann Arbor: University of Michigan Press. ISBN 9780472027279.
- Drezner, Daniel W. (1999). The Sanctions Paradox: Economic statecraft and international relations. Cambridge England New York: Cambridge University Press. ISBN 9780521643320.

=== As editor ===
- The Uses and Abuses of Weaponized Interdependence. Brookings Institution Press, 2021.

=== Peer-reviewed journal articles ===
- Drezner, Daniel W. (March 2008). "The realist tradition in American public opinion". Perspectives on Politics. 6 (1): 51–70. CiteSeerX 10.1.1.552.8386. doi:10.1017/S1537592708080067. JSTOR 20446637. S2CID 13362474. Pdf.
- Drezner, Daniel W. (2008), "International economic order", in Darity, William A. (ed.), International encyclopedia of the social sciences, volume 4: Inequality, income – Marxism (2nd ed.), Detroit: Macmillan Reference USA, ISBN 9780028659695.
- Drezner, Daniel W.; Farrell, Henry (January 2008). "Introduction: blogs, politics and power: a special issue of Public Choice". Public Choice. 134 (1–2): 1–13. doi:10.1007/s11127-007-9206-5. JSTOR 27698207. S2CID 155015162.
- Drezner, Daniel W.; Farrell, Henry (January 2008). "The power and politics of blogs". Public Choice. 134 (1–2): 15–30. doi:10.1007/s11127-007-9198-1. hdl:10831/33516. JSTOR 27698208. S2CID 10449341.
- Drezner, Daniel W. (October 2005). "Globalization, harmonization, and competition: the different pathways to policy convergence". Journal of European Public Policy. 12 (5): 841–859. doi:10.1080/13501760500161472. S2CID 153422328.
- Drezner, Daniel W. (Fall 2004). "The global governance of the internet: bringing the State back in". Political Science Quarterly. 119 (3): 477–498. doi:10.2307/20202392. JSTOR 20202392.
- Drezner, Daniel W. (Summer 2003). "The hidden hand of economic coercion". International Organization. 57 (3): 643–659. doi:10.1017/S0020818303573052. JSTOR 3594840. S2CID 154827129.
- Drezner, Daniel W. (January 2001). "Outside the box: explaining sanctions in pursuit of foreign economic goals". International Interactions. 26 (4): 379–410. doi:10.1080/03050620108434972. S2CID 154390438.
- Drezner, Daniel W. (Spring 2001). "Globalization and policy convergence". International Studies Review. 3 (1): 53–78. doi:10.1111/1521-9488.00225. JSTOR 3186512.
- Drezner, Daniel W. (January 2001). "State structure, technological leadership and the maintenance of hegemony". Review of International Studies. 27 (1): 3–25. doi:10.1017/S0260210501000031. JSTOR 20079588. S2CID 145570456.
- Drezner, Daniel W. (October 2000). "Ideas, bureaucratic politics, and the crafting of foreign policy". American Journal of Political Science. 44 (4): 733–749. doi:10.2307/2669278. JSTOR 2669278.
- Drezner, Daniel W. (Winter 2000). "Bargaining, enforcement, and multilateral sanctions: when is cooperation counterproductive?". International Organization. 54 (1): 73–102. CiteSeerX 10.1.1.488.7914. doi:10.1162/002081800551127. JSTOR 2601318. S2CID 20451638.
- Drezner, Daniel W. (September 1999). "The trouble with carrots: transaction costs, conflict expectations, and economic inducements". Security Studies. 9 (1–2): 188–218. doi:10.1080/09636419908429399.
- Drezner, Daniel W. (December 1998). "Conflict expectations and the paradox of economic coercion". International Studies Quarterly. 42 (4): 709–731. doi:10.1111/0020-8833.00103. JSTOR 2600899.
- Drezner, Daniel W. (September 1998). "So you want to get a tenure-track job..." PS: Political Science & Politics. 31 (3): 609–614. doi:10.2307/420623. JSTOR 420623. S2CID 154488615.
- Drezner, Daniel W. (March 1997). "Allies, adversaries, and economic coercion: Russian foreign economic policy since 1991". Security Studies. 6 (3): 65–111. doi:10.1080/09636419708429315.
