= Taylor Fravel =

American political scientist

- Other name: 傅泰林
- Education: Middlebury College (AB), Oxford University (MA), London School of Economics (MS), Stanford University (PhD)
- Occupation: Political scientist
- Employer: MIT
- Board member of: National Committee on U.S.-China Relations

Taylor Fravel (born 1971) is an American political scientist. He specializes in international security.

== Education ==
Fravel earned his AB in history (summa cum laude) from Middlebury College in 1993, MA in philosophy, politics and economics from New College, Oxford as a Rhodes Scholar in 1995, MS in international relations (with distinction) from London School of Economics, and PhD in political science from Stanford University in 2004.

== Career ==
Fravel is the Director of the Security Studies Program at Massachusetts Institute of Technology (MIT) and is associated with Princeton University and the American Academy of Arts and Sciences. He is a member of the board of directors for the National Committee on U.S.-China Relations and a participant of the Task Force on U.S.-China Policy convened by Asia Society's Center on U.S.-China Relations.

== Publications ==
Fravel is on the editorial boards of and has been published in journals including International Studies Quarterly, Security Studies, Journal of Strategic Studies, and The China Quarterly. Books authored include two volumes of 'Princeton Studies in International Relations and History':

- Active Defense: China’s Military Strategy Since 1949. Princeton University Press, 2020. ISBN 9780691210339
- Strong Borders, Secure Nation: Conflict and Cooperation in China’s Territorial Disputes. Princeton University Press, 2008. ISBN 9781400828876
