= Migration diplomacy =

Management of cross-border population mobility

In international relations, migration diplomacy is 'the use of diplomatic tools, processes, and procedures to manage cross-border population mobility,' including 'both the strategic use of migration flows as a means to obtain other aims, and the use of diplomatic methods to achieve goals related to migration.' Migration has come to constitute an increasingly-important area of states' engagement with one another, with bilateral multilateral strategies including the promotion or discouragement of bilateral migratory flows; agreements on preferential treatment to certain foreign nationals; the initiation of guest-worker programmes or other short-term labor migration schemes; the deportation of foreign nationals; and so on.

== Background ==
For political scientist James F. Hollifield, the latter half of the twentieth century gave rise to the migration state, which followed the garrison state of the eighteen and nineteenth centuries, and the trading state of the nineteenth and twentieth centuries: whereas, in the past, a central component of states' functions related to their ability to engage in war or to manage trade, the contemporary state is defined by the management of cross-border population mobility. As a result, migration affects the diplomatic interactions of states and has become an object of interstate diplomacy. According to Adamson and Tsourapas, states' migration diplomacy is affected by their interests and bargaining position vis-à-vis other states, based partly on whether they are migration-receiving, migration-sending, or transit states.

Beyond international relations, a number of other social scientists have examined the link between migration and foreign policy in history, area studies, as well as security studies, and elsewhere. Thiollet examines the political dynamics of labor migration in the Middle East, and argues that 'migration policy should be analyzed as an indirect form of foreign policy that uses the selection of migrants and quasi-asylum policies as diplomacy.' For İçduygu and Aksel, the ongoing membership negotiations between Turkey and the European Union demonstrate the strategic use of migration diplomacy as a bargaining tool.

== Coercive Migration Diplomacy ==
Kelly Greenhill has argued that cross-border mobility may be employed as "weapons of mass migration" States may engage in coercive migration diplomacy, namely 'the threat or act by a state, or coalition of states, to affect either migration flows to/from a target state or its migrant stock as a punishment, unless the target state acquiesces to an articulated political or economic demand.' Coercive migration diplomacy strategies involve violence or the threat of force. For Adamson and Tsourapas, coercive migration diplomacy relies on states' adoption of a unilateral approach to interstate bargaining, namely a zero-sum perspective of relative gain, where only one side is expected to benefit. Greenhill has written on the conditions under which the intentional creation, manipulation, and exploitation of real or threatened mass population movements may constitute an element of coercion in international relations.

Coercion is also used to force third countries to impose anti-migrant policies, for example the sanctions that the Trump administration threatened to inflict on Mexico. These sanctions prevented Mexico from developing an independent migration policy.

== Cooperative Migration Diplomacy ==
The emphasis on coercive behaviour does not encapsulate the full range of state practices: in the case of Niger, the government 'benefits from a degree of international legitimacy and support' and is particularly aid dependent. Besides coercion, states may engage in cooperative migration diplomacy, namely 'the promise or act by a state, or coalition of states, to affect either migration flows to/from a target state or its migrant stock as a reward, provided that the target state acquiesces to an articulated political or economic demand.' Cooperative migration diplomacy is predicated upon interstate bargaining explicitly aiming for mutually beneficial arrangements in the absence of aggression.

== See also ==
- Border barrier
- Demographic threat
- Weaponized migration
- Non-refoulement
- Pidyon shvuyim
- Prisoner of Zion
- Refugee kidnappings in Sinai
- Refugee roulette
- Refusenik
- Selling of Jews by Romania
