= Marijke Breuning =

American political scientist

Academic background
- Education: Ohio State University
- Thesis: National Role Conceptions and Foreign Assistance Policy Behavior toward a Cognitive Model (1992)
- Doctoral advisor: Donald A. Sylvan

Academic work
- Discipline: International relations
- Sub-discipline: Foreign policy analysis
- Institutions: University of North Texas
- Main interests: development cooperation; women and gender; international children’s rights
- Notable works: Foreign Policy Analysis: A Comparative Introduction (2007)

Marijke Breuning (born 1957) is an American political scientist specializing in foreign policy analysis (FPA) and a professor of Political Science at the University of North Texas.

Breuning was born and raised in the Netherlands, where she completed her initial post-secondary education at the School voor de Journalistiek (School for Journalism) in Utrecht, the Netherlands. She completed a Master's and PhD at the Ohio State University.

Breuning serves on editorial boards in the International Studies Association and American Political Science Association. She served as the book review editor of International Politics (2000-2003), co-editor of the Journal of Political Science Education (2005-2012), an editor of Foreign Policy Analysis (2005-2009), and editor of the American Political Science Review (2012-2016). She is a contributor to SAGE Publications's 21st Century Political Science: A Reference Handbook (2011).

== Publications ==
- How to Get Published in the Best Political Science and International Relations Journals: Understanding the Publishing Game (Edward Elgar Publishing, 2021), with John Ishiyama
- 21st Century Political Science: A Reference Handbook (SAGE Publications, 2010), with John Ishiyama
- Foreign Policy Analysis: A Comparative Introduction (Palgrave Macmillan, 2007)
- Introduction To Foreign Policy Analysis (Routledge, 1999)
- Fundamentals of International Relations (1991)

== Personal life ==
Breuning and her husband adopted two daughters from Ethiopia.
