= Annette Freyberg-Inan =

German political scientist

Annette Freyberg-Inan is a German-born political scientist and a faculty member at the University of Amsterdam’s Faculty of Social and Behavioural Sciences. She has written extensively on issues related to international relations theory, politics in Europe, including Turkey, and the internationalization of higher education.

== Career ==
Freyberg-Inan earned her MA in political science and English from the University of Stuttgart and later completed her PhD in political science at the University of Georgia. Early in her career, she served as a UN consultant in Romania and became a Civic Education Project visiting faculty fellow at the University of Bucharest (2000–2003). During this time, she co-founded The Romanian Journal of Society and Politics in 2000, the first Romanian political science journal to implement double-blind peer review.

Freyberg-Inan's 2004 book What Moves Man critically examines the foundations of realist International Relations theory, challenging its assumptions about human nature and advocating for a more nuanced understanding of state behaviour. Scholar Patrick James described it as “the best treatment of realism I have seen from an interdisciplinary standpoint.”

She has held academic positions at the University of Amsterdam, the Technische Universität Darmstadt, and the University of Edinburgh. Freyberg-Inan returned to the University of Amsterdam in 2013, where she served as the director of the Graduate School of Social Sciences (2017–2023).

Freyberg-Inan served as the vice-president of the International Studies Association (2013-2014), as president of its Theory Section (2015-2017), and on the executive council of the Central and Eastern European International Studies Association (2010–2016). She has held editorial roles including executive editor of The Romanian Journal of Society and Politics (2000–2003), associate editor of the Journal of International Relations and Development (2012–2015), and co-editor of the European Journal of International Relations (2018–2022).

== Books ==
- What Moves Man: The Realist Theory of International Relations and Its Judgment of Human Nature (SUNY Press, 2004).
- The Ghosts in Our Classrooms, or John Dewey Meets Ceausescu: The Promise and the Failures of Civic Education in Romania (Ibidem Verlag, 2006).
- Rethinking Realism in International Relations: Between Tradition and Innovation, co-edited with Ewan Harrison and Patrick James (Johns Hopkins University Press, 2009).
- Human Beings in International Relations, co-edited with Daniel Jacobi (Cambridge University Press, 2015).
- Growing Together, Growing Apart: Turkey and the European Union Today, co-edited with Mehmet Bardakci and Olaf Leisse (Nomos, 2016).
- Evaluating Progress in International Relations: How Do You Know? co-edited with Ewan Harrison and Patrick James (Routledge, 2016).
- Religious Minorities in Turkey: Alevi, Armenians, and Syriacs and the Struggle to Desecuritize Religious Freedom, co-authored with Mehmet Bardakçi, Christoph Giesel, and Olaf Leisse (Palgrave, 2017).
- Universitas: Why Higher Education Must Be International (Rowman & Littlefield, 2025).
