= Mark A. Boyer =

American political scientist

- Born: June 15, 1961 (age 65)
- Education: University of Maryland; Wittenberg University
- Scientific career
- Fields: Political science International relations
- Workplaces: University of Connecticut
- Website: Mark A. Boyer

Mark A. Boyer (born June 15, 1961) is a Board of Trustees Distinguished Professor in the Department of Geography at the University of Connecticut. He is a specialist in international relations theory. His recent scholarship analyzes governmental responses to climate change at the regional and local level. He has also investigated pedagogical methodologies.

Boyer served as executive director of the International Studies Association from 2015 until 2024. He had previously served as a co-editor of International Studies Review (2008–2012) and editor of International Studies Perspectives (2000–2004); he continues to serve as an editorial board member for both journals. He is also co-director of the GlobalEd 2 project, which conducts computer-assisted international studies simulations for middle school and high school students throughout the United States.

Boyer received the Ladd Hollist Service Award in 2008 and the Rowman & Littlefield Award for Innovative Teaching in Political Science in 2000.

== Publications ==
Books

- Global Politics: Engaging a Complex World. Co-author with Natalie F. Hudson and Michael J. Butler. (McGraw-Hill, 2012).
- Defensive Internationalism: Providing Global Public Goods in an Uncertain World. Co-author with Davis B. Bobrow. (University of Michigan Press, 2005).
- International Cooperation and Public Goods: Opportunities for the Western Alliance. (Johns Hopkins University Press, 1993).

== See also ==
- Public Choice theory
- Institutional liberalism (i.e., Liberal Institutionalism)
