= Paweł Jędrzejko =

- Born: 27 June 1970 (age 56); Katowice, Poland
- Citizenship: Poland
- Education: Adam Mickiewicz University in Poznań
- Known for: Melville w kontekstach: czyli prolegomena do studiów melvillistycznych. Kierunki badań – biografia – kultura (in Polish); Płynność i egzystencja. Doświadczenie lądu i morza a myśl Hermana Melville’a (in Polish); Hearts of darkness: Melville, Conrad and narratives of oppression Secret Sharers: Melville, Conrad and Narratives of the Real
- Awards: Gold Badge of Merit for the University of Silesia in Katowice
- Scientific career
- Fields: Cultural studies American literature Translation studies.
- Workplaces: University of Silesia in Katowice
- Thesis: Series of publications devoted to the work and philosophical thought of Herman Melville (2013)

Paweł Jędrzejko (born 27 June 1970 in Katowice, Poland) is a literary scholar and an Americanist, translation studies scholar, musician and yachtsman. Member of the Polish a cappella sextet Banana Boat.

== Family and education ==
Born into the family of university professors, the botanist Krzysztof Jędrzejko (1945–2012) and linguist Ewa Jędrzejko, Paweł Jędrzejko is the elder brother of Maciej Jędrzejko (b. 1977), the founder and lead vocalist of the Polish a cappella sextet Banana Boat. Following in his mother's footsteps, Jędrzejko chose to pursue his career in modern languages and letters. In 1995, he received his MA in English from Adam Mickiewicz University in Poznań, Poland. In the year 2000, he was granted his PhD in humanities from the University of Silesia in Katowice for his dissertation dedicated to Herman Melville's existentialism. Since then, he has been a faculty member of the Institute of English Cultures and Literatures at the Faculty of Philology, University of Silesia. In 2013, having earned his habilitation in humanities within the discipline of literary studies on the basis of a thematic cycle of publications dedicated to the work and thought of Herman Melville, he received tenure and was appointed associate professor of the University of Silesia in Katowice. Between 2013 and 2020, when the organizational structure of the University of Silesia was revised, he chaired the Department of American and Canadian Studies of the Institute of English Cultures and Literatures at the University of Silesia in Katowice.

== Functions in learned societies and journals ==
Between October 2021 and December 2023, Jędrzejko held the function of the President of the International American Studies Association (IASA). In years 2003–2009, and then since 2013, Paweł Jędrzejko has served as a member of the Executive Board of the IASA. He is the co-founder and co-editor-in-chief of the Association's learned journal, the Review of International American Studies. Jędrzejko is a member of Polish and international academic associations, such as The Melville Society, Modern Language Association, American Studies Association, or the Polish Association for American Studies. Since 2013, he has been working as the associate editor of the high-ranking international learned journal of theory, literature and cultural studies, Er(r)go: Theory– Literature–Culture.

== Research interests ==
Paweł Jędrzejko's research interests include literary and cultural theory, history of literature, comparative cultural studies, translation theory and philosophy. Departing from the assumption of the aporetic (ontic/discursive) character of reality, Jędrzejko fosters research penetrating the common grounds of human cognitive experience and creative activity and focusing upon the complex interdependencies between individual awareness of the worldmaking power of language and the shape of daily interpersonal and intercultural relations. The areas of his particular interest include the philosophy of friendship, the philosophy of existence, the history of 19th century American literature, the literary philosophies of the "American Renaissance" the oeuvre of Herman Melville, postcolonial and post-dependence theories, as well as translation theories.

== Major publications ==
Having authored numerous scholarly articles and popular texts, book reviews and critical notes, Jędrzejko has also facilitated the development of international scholarship as the co-editor of a number of collective volumes and journal issues. Notably, he is the author of the first full-fledged monographs dedicated to Herman Melville in the Polish language.

=== Books (written and co-edited) ===
- Paweł Jędrzejko, Marcin Fabjański, Dariusz Kubok. Atmospheric Health, Nature, and Well-being: Towards a Philosophy of the Garden, London and New York: Routledge, 2025. Pages: 384. ISBN 9781032357676
- Zbigniew Białas, Paweł Jędrzejko, Julia Szołtysek, eds. Culture and the Rites/Rights of Grief, Newcastle: Cambridge Scholars Publishing, 2013. Pages: 260. ISBN 978-1-4438-5059-9
- Zbigniew Białas, Paweł Jędrzejko, Karolina Lebek, eds. Inside-Out: Discourses of Interiority and Worldmaking Imagination, Bielsko-Biała: Wydawcnictwo WSEH, 2012. Pages: 277. ISBN 978-83-928226-3-9
- Paweł Jędrzejko, Milton M. Reigelman, Zuzanna Szatanik, eds. Secret Sharers: Melville, Conrad and Narratives of the Real, Zabrze: M-Studio, 2011. Pages: 395. ISBN 978-83-62023-56-1
- Paweł Jędrzejko, Milton M. Reigelman, Zuzanna Szatanik, eds. Hearts of Darkness: Melville, Conrad and Narratives of Oppression, Zabrze: M-Studio, 2010. Pages: 262. ISBN 978-83-62023-40-0
- Paweł Jędrzejko. Płynność i egzystencja. Doświadczenie lądu i morza a myśl Hermana Melville'a, Katowice: Bananaart.pl/ExMachina/M-Studio, 2008. Pages: 372. ISBN 978-83-88427-76-3 (in Polish)
- Paweł Jędrzejko. Melville w kontekstach czyli prolegomena do studiów melvillistycznych (kierunki badań--biografia-kultura), Katowice: Bananaart.pl/ExMachina/M-Studio, 2007. Pages: 157. ISBN 83-88427-50-4 (in Polish)
- Wojciech Kalaga, Eugeniusz Knapik, eds., Paweł Jędrzejko, Stanisław Kosz, Marcin Trzęsiok – assistant eds. Styl późny w muzyce i literaturze, Katowice: Wydawnictwo Naukowe Śląsk, 2002. Pages: 240. ISBN 978-83-716-4304-0 (in Polish)
- Teresa Pyzik, Paweł Jędrzejko, eds. Reflections on Ethical Values in Post(?)Modern American Literature, Katowice: Wydawnictwo UŚ, 2000. Pages: 238. ISBN 83-226-0962-0

== Service to the International Academic Community ==
Paweł Jędrzejko has been responsible for the organization of major International conferences, such as the 6th International Melville Society Conference in Szczecin, Poland (2007), the "Oceans Apart: In Search of New Wor(l)ds” World Congress of the International American Studies Association in 2013, or the 11th World Congress of the International American Studies Association "“Journeying (the) Americas: The Paradoxes of Travel (and) Narratives”.

Throughout his career, Jędrzejko has delivered numerous guest lectures in Poland, Europe, Asia, and the US (Grinnell College, University of Iowa, Centre College, Massachusetts Institute of Technology). In the years 2000–2002, he served as a Civic Education Project Local Faculty Fellow, responsible for building bridges between the western democracies and the countries of Central and Eastern Europe by means of academic curriculum development and organization of international research cooperation among students. As promoter of learning, Jędrzejko regularly organizes outreach events popularizing scholarship and science, such as "The Whale of a Day" dedicated to Herman Melville, "Winnie-the-Pooh's 90th Anniversary," or "Bitter Fame" (an event dedicated to Ted Hughes and Sylvia Plath), organized by the prestigious Silesian Library in Katowice, Poland. In 2009 Paweł Jędrzejko was shortlisted for the Students’ Laurel Award in the category of "Students’ Friend," granted annually by the Student Government of the University of Silesia in Katowice.

== Administration and organizational achievements ==
Between 2013 and 2020, Paweł Jędrzejko held the chair of the Department of American and Canadian Studies of the Institute of English Cultures and Literatures at the Faculty of Philology of the University of Silesia in Katowice. Previously, in years 2012–2013, he served as the Rector's Plenipotentiary for Recruitment, as a member of the University Commission for the Optimization of Administration, and as a member of the University of Silesia Fundrising Committee. Between 2013 and 2017, Jędrzejko held the position of the director of the University of Silesia Press. As the director of the publishing house whose history dates back to 1968, he was responsible for the reinforcing of the brand's position in the academic book market by means of the implementation of mechanisms facilitating electronic workflow and document flow, the development and implementation of electronic platforms for the purpose of the distribution and indexation of publications of the University of Silesia faculty. To attain this goal, he carried out the structural reorganization of the Press to ensure the compatibility of the Press with the requirements of the contemporary academic publishing market and entered his unit into cooperation with partners at home and internationally

As the director of the University of Silesia Press, by ministerial appointment, in years 2015–2016, he served as a member of the Advisory Committee for the Implementation of the Strategy of the Open Access to Academic Contents at the Polish Ministry of Science and Higher Education. In the same years, he served as the representative of the president of the Conference of the Rectors of Academic Schools of Poland (CRASP) in an international contact group at the European University Association. On numerous occasions, Jędrzejko represented his home University in negotiations with key international partners representing the socioeconomic ecosystem of the University of Silesia in Katowice; in this capacity, he continues to serve as a member of the board of the Association for the Development of the Smart Silesian Metropolis "Smarter Silesia". As a consequence of his commitment to the fostering of the transfer of knowledge between industry, socioeconomic environment, business and academia, Jędrzejko was able to use his experience to initiate two innovative academic programs: "SPRINT – Studies on the Production of Interactive Entertainment" (coordinated today by Marcin Sarnek, Małgorzata Łuszczak and Urszula Boryczka) and "American and Canadian Studies for Intercultural Relations and Diplomacy"

In 2016, in recognition of his overall contribution to the development of scholarship and in appreciation of his achievements in the field of the organization of academic life, he was awarded the Gold Badge of Merit of the University of Silesia in Katowice (Zasłużony dla Uniwersytetu Śląskiego).

== Artistic activity ==
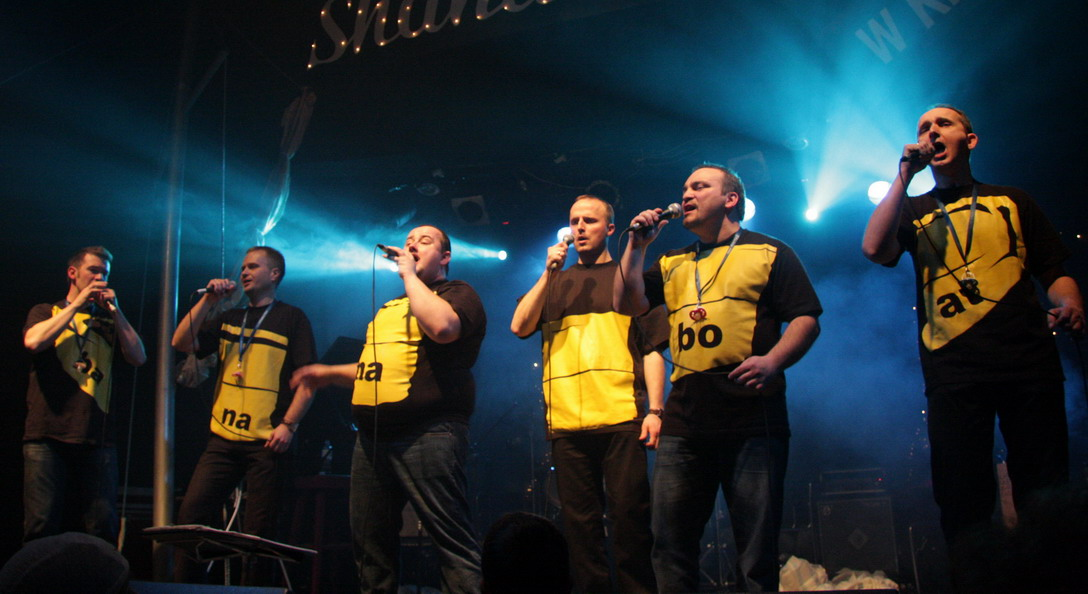
Bana Boat on stage. Paweł Jędrzejko first right

Since 1998, Paweł Jędrzejko has been a member of the Polish a cappella sextet Banana Boat performing as the band's baritone and baritenor and as its lyricist. In the latter capacity, he has authored a number of award-winning songs recorded on original albums: A morze tak, a może nie..., Banana Boat... Świątecznie, A Little A Cappella: A Polish-Irish Harmony (with Eleanor McEvoy), Aquareal and Ono. Jędrzejko is an advocate and promoter of the new genre he calls neo-shanty. As Banana Boat member, he participated in the organization of a number of cultural and artistic events, of which the most important are the "Zęza" International Sea Song Festival in Łaziska Górne, Poland (2002–2007), the charity event Zobaczyć morze (To See the Sea), as well as the Cobh Maritime Song Festival in Sirius Arts Centre in Cobh, Ireland, or the World Fusion Music Festival Euroshanties&Folk organized in Sosnowiec, Poland. Jędrzejko is an author of such songs as the 2005 CARA award runner-up Arktyka, or the flagship song of the 2016 CARA award runner-up album Aquareal titled Stavanger. He writes popular texts for portals and magazines dedicated to maritime culture. He also offers workshops for songwriters and lyricists. In 2006, he played a mini-role in the feature movie Hi Way (2006).

== Yachting ==
Paweł Jędrzejko holds the licenses of Ocean Going Yachtmaster and Ocean Going Motorboat Master. He has been actively involved in open sea yachting and its promotion since 1984. In the years 1992–1994, he made three crossings of the Atlantic Ocean under sail. Since 1998, Jędrzejko has been organizing and skippering sailing cruises in various waters of Europe. Between 2008 and 2012, Jędrzejko served as a member of the Polish Yachting Association’s Commission for Culture and Ethics. He offers workshops dedicated to safety at sea. He is a member of the prestigious Captains' Circle "Silesia." His organizational constellation is Leo Minor. In 2024, he has become the winner of the 2024 "Silesian Sails" Award in the category of "The Sailing Cruise of the Year" for his transatlantic expedition on board the catamaran Ron Punch from Cienfuegos in Cuba to Palma de Mallorca in Spain.
