= David A. Lake =

American political scientist (born 1956)

David A. Lake (born 10 August 1956) is an American political scientist. He is the Gerri-Ann and Gary E. Jacobs Professor of Social Sciences and Distinguished Professor of Political Science at the University of California, San Diego. He is known for his contributions to International Relations and International Political Economy. He was elected to the American Academy of Arts and Sciences in 2006. He has been President of the International Studies Association and the American Political Science Association.

== Education ==
He received his PhD from Cornell University in 1984. His dissertation advisor was Richard Rosecrance. Peter Katzenstein was on his dissertation committee.
