= Tabitha M. Benney =

Professor

Academic background
- Education: Georgetown University; University of California, Santa Barbara

Academic work
- Discipline: Political Scientist
- Main interests: International Political Economy
- Notable ideas: The evolving role of Emerging market economies (EMEs) in addressing the climate crisis.

Tabitha M. Benney is a Professor in the University of Utah's School of Public Affairs and Associate Director in the Master of Science in International Affairs and Global Enterprise (MIAGE) Program, Affiliated Faculty in the School of Environment, Society, and Sustainability (ESS), Latin American Studies, International Studies, Asian Studies, and the Center on Global Change and Sustainability.

She currently serves as the director of the Utah Radon Lab (2022–present) and as an Executive Council Member for the Energy Futures Research Engine (2023–present) in the Office of the Vice President of Research at the University of Utah.

== Career ==
Benney teaches in the fields of international relations, international and political economy, energy and environmental politics, public policy, and research methods. Her multidisciplinary research maps interactions within complex coupled systems to develop research-based policy solutions to address a range of technical issues. Benney's current research agenda is focused on health disparities and inequality related to the impacts of energy, climate, and air quality in urban, rural, and tribal areas.

She works with an interdisciplinary team of researcher who study air quality, energy, and climate change impacts on inequality and health disparities at varying scales (international, national, county, and zip code levels). She also researches energy and environmental issues within Tribal populations of the American West.

Benney is also an expert in emerging areas of political economy that focus on energy coalitions, global currency flows, and low carbon energy transitions.

She received the Louis G. Lancaster's International Relations Award, the Interdisciplinary Research Pilot Program (IRPP) Grant, the Betty Glad Research Award, the International Studies Association (ISA) Catalytic Research Workshop Grant, and the Emerging COVID-19/SARS-CoV-2 Health Science Research Grant.

Most recently, Benney received the Distinguished Teaching Award at the University of Utah for 2022-2023. She also received the Faculty Fellow Award from the College of Social and Behavioral Science in Fall 2022, the 3i Team Development Award from University of Utah Health in 2022, and the USTEM Collaborative Grant Award in 2024.

== Research work ==
Benney's research is focused on the intersection of International Political Economy and Environmental Studies, and her interdisciplinary research uses a wide range of research methods and designs to study governance issues at a range of spatial scales.

Benney's current research is centered around the inconsistent distribution of environmental justice and human health issues stemming from environmental degradation in urban, rural, and tribal areas.

She is known for her research on air pollution, especially the relationship between indoor and outdoor air quality and its impact on various health outcomes, including cancers, asthma, and other respiratory and cardiovascular diseases. She also studies these impacts on vulnerable groups such as children, the elderly, and low income, or tribal communities.

Benney has been involved in studies that assess the health and economic costs of air pollution, especially in places with poor air quality like Utah. Her work aims to provide valuable evidence to policymakers and the public about the harmful effects of air pollution on health, including its contribution to chronic conditions such as heart disease, cancer and chronic obstructive pulmonary disease (COPD).

== Selected publications ==
=== Journals ===
- Mendoza, Daniel L.; Benney, Tabitha M.; Bares, Ryan; Crosman, Erik T. (2021-10-01). "Intra-city variability of fine particulate matter during COVID-19 lockdown: A case study from Park City, Utah". Environmental Research. 201 111471. Bibcode:2021ER....20111471M. doi:10.1016/j.envres.2021.111471. ISSN 0013-9351. PMC 8178539. PMID 34102162.
- Benney, Tabitha M.; Mendoza, Daniel L.; Boll, Sarah (2021). "Long-term analysis of the relationships between indoor and outdoor fine particulate pollution: A case study using research grade sensors". Science of the Total Environment. 776 145778. Bibcode:2021ScTEn.77645778M. doi:10.1016/j.scitotenv.2021.145778. ISSN 0048-9697. PMC 9753328. PMID 33647662.
- Benney, Tabitha M., Philip Singer, Robbie Chaney, and Chantel Sloan (2020) "Utah Air Quality Risk and Behavioral Action Survey,"Tabitha Benney, University of Utah; Robert Chaney, Brigham Young University; Phillip Singer, University of Utah; Chantel Sloan, Brigham Young University (2020-02-24), Utah Air Quality Risk and Behavioral Action Survey, Inter-university Consortium for Political and Social Research (ICPSR), doi:10.3886/E117904V1
- Mendoza, Daniel L.; Buchert, Martin P.; Benney, Tabitha M.; Lin, John C. (2020-08-12). "The Association of Media and Environmental Variables with Transit Ridership". Vehicles. 2 (3): 507–522. doi:10.3390/vehicles2030028. ISSN 2624-8921.
- Benney, Tabitha M. (2021-10-02). "Varieties of capitalism and renewable energy in emerging and developing economies". Journal of Economic Policy Reform. 24 (4): 413–438. doi:10.1080/17487870.2019.1637584. ISSN 1748-7870.
- Cohen, Benjamin J.; Benney, Tabitha M. (2014). "What does the international currency system really look like?". Review of International Political Economy. 21 (5): 1017–1041. doi:10.1080/09692290.2013.830980. ISSN 0969-2290. JSTOR 24673031.
- Pulver, Simone; Benney, Tabitha (2013). "Private-sector responses to climate change in the Global South". WIREs Climate Change. 4 (6): 479–496. Bibcode:2013WIRCC...4..479P. doi:10.1002/wcc.240. ISSN 1757-7780.

=== Books ===
- Betsill, Michele M.; Benney, Tabitha M.; Gerlak, Andrea K., eds. (2020-01-02). Agency in Earth System Governance. Cambridge University Press. doi:10.1017/9781108688277. ISBN 978-1-108-68827-7.
- Benney, Tabitha M. (2014-11-27). Making Environmental Markets Work. Routledge. doi:10.4324/9781315751320. ISBN 978-1-317-61481-4.
- M.Benney, Tabitha (2018). "Climate change, sustainable development, and vulnerability". Routledge Handbook of Ethics and International Relations. Routledge. pp. 392–404. doi:10.4324/9781315725932-34. ISBN 9781315725932.
- Benney, Tabitha M. (2015). Making environmental markets work: the varieties of capitalism in the emerging economies. Environmental politics/Routledge research in environmental politics. New York London: Routledge. ISBN 978-1-315-75132-0.
