= Deborah Avant =

American political scientist

Deborah Denise Avant (born November 26, 1958) is an American political scientist and faculty member at the University of Denver's Josef Korbel School of International Studies. Avant was also the inaugural Director of the university's Sie Cheou-Kang Center for International Security and Diplomacy and is a Distinguished University Professor. In 2015 Professor Avant launched the Journal of Global Security Studies for which she served as Editor-in-Chief until 2020. She was the 2022-2023 president of the International Studies Association.

== Education ==
Avant received her B.A., M.A. and Ph.D. at the University of California, San Diego. She previously taught at the George Washington University where she directed the Security Policy Studies Program and then the Institute for Global and International Studies. She then moved to the University of California, Irvine where, between 2007 and 2011 she was the Director of International Studies and the Center for Research on International and Global Studies (RIGS), Political Science School of Social Sciences. Avant jointed the University of Denver faculty in 2011 when she was named the inaugural holder of the Sie Cheou-Kang Center for International Security and Diplomacy Endowed Chair. In 2022–2023, she served as the president of the International Studies Association.

== Bibliography ==
=== Books ===
- Civil Action and the Dynamics of Violence (co-edited with Marie Berry, Erica Chenoweth, Rachel Epstein, Cullen Hendrix, Oliver Kaplan, and Timothy Sisk)
- The New Power Politics: Networks and Security Governance (co-edited with Oliver Westerwinter)
- Who Governs the Globe? (co-edited with Martha Finnemore and Susan Sell)
- The Market for Force: The Consequences of Privatizing Security
- Political Institutions and Military Change: Lessons from Peripheral Wars
