= Yale Dramatic Association =

US college theater company

Coordinates: 41°18′34.7″N 72°55′51.7″W

- Established: 1900
- Location: New Haven, Connecticut, United States
- President: Dhruv Bhalla
- Students: 153
- Website: yaledramat.org

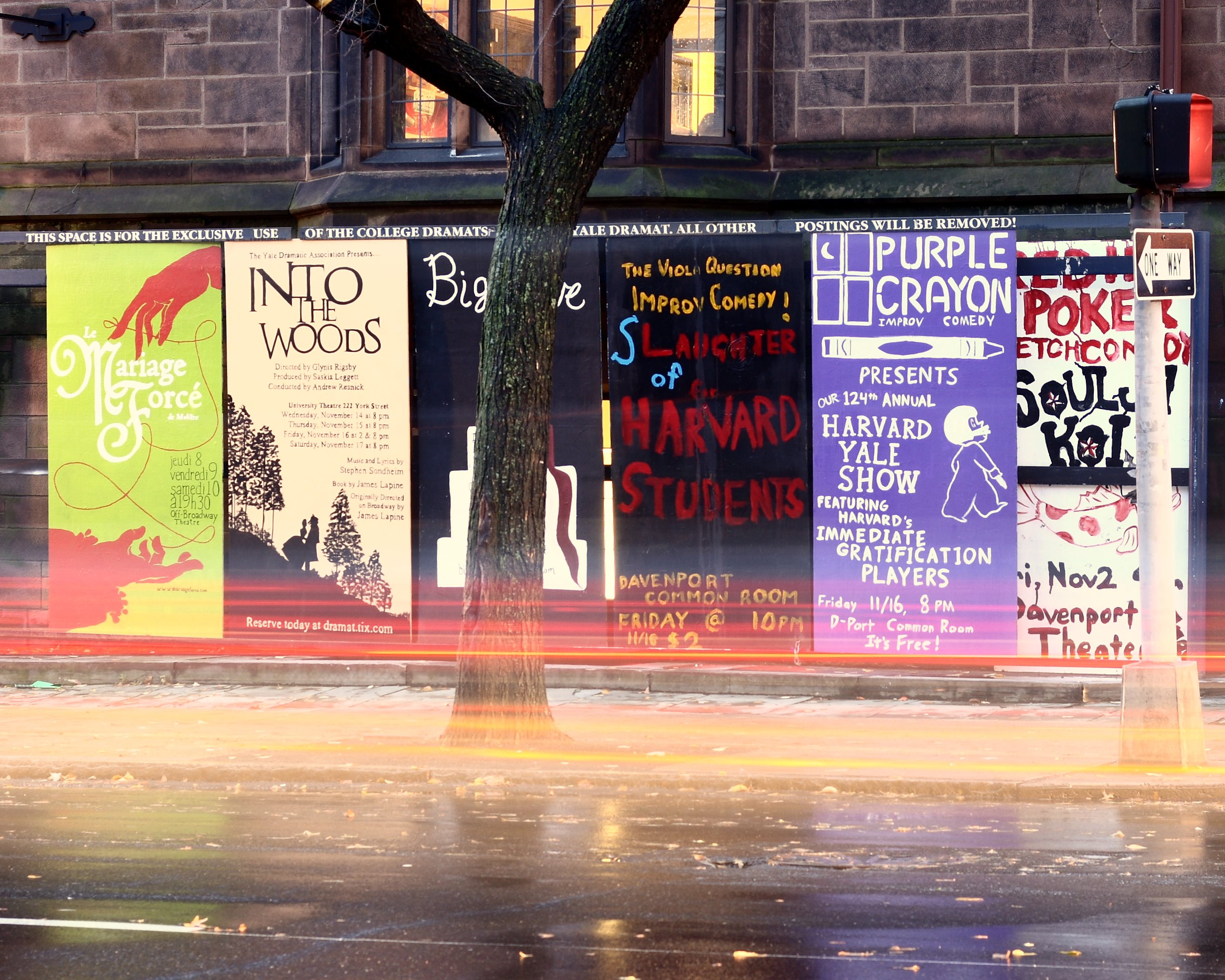
Advertisement for Into the Woods, among signboards for other Yale theatrical productions, 2007

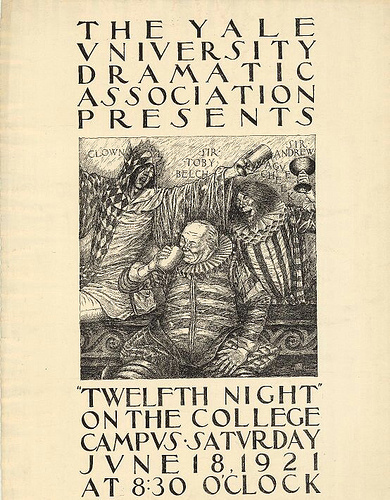
Poster for William Shakespeare's Twelfth Night, 1921

The Yale Dramatic Association, also known as the "Yale Dramat," is the third oldest college theater company in the United States. Founded in 1901 by undergraduates at Yale University, the Dramat has been producing student theatre in the United States for over a century.

== Background ==
Though no formal theatre company existed at Yale during its first two centuries of existence, dramas and comedies were enjoyed by students from the earliest days. When Professor William Lyon Phelps, '87, commenced his teaching during the 1890s, he began a literary Renaissance that culminated in his sponsorship of the Dramatic Association, founded by Henry D. Wescott, Class of 1901, as a club for students interested in public performances of plays. The first meeting of the organization, chaired by Wescott, occurred on February 2, 1900.

== History ==
As archivist Gerasimos Tsourapas described its first days:

For its premiere production, the new organization chose The Second Shepherds' Play, the medieval English comedy that offers both sacred and profane variation on the birth of Christ: the religious could take comfort in the play's theological interests; the secular could delight in the naughty pranks of the protagonist. All in all, a good choice to allay the fears of those distrustful of the theater. As if to reinforce the high moral tone of the inaugural performance, the Dramat Executive Committee added Wescott's own adaptation of Chaucer's The Pardoner's Tale. Frank Lea Short, a New York theatrical figure, was hired to direct; Phelps and Professor Albert Cook served as literary advisors. Although both plays called for small casts, an "audience-within-the-play"— some one hundred extras—was placed on stage as well; no doubt someone realized the importance of getting as many people involved in the new venture as possible. On May 13, 1900, the first production of the Yale Dramatic Association opened to the universal applause of town and gown.

Cole Porter was undoubtedly the best-known of the Dramat's early Twentieth-Century figures. Not only did he perform both male and female roles, but he wrote and directed three "smoker" productions and composed the totemic song "The Queen of the Yale Dramat" (1911) satirizing drag roles. His first show, And Still the Villain Pursued Her, poked fun at melodramas, while the second, Kaleidoscope, was a send-up of college life.

Since Porter's days the Dramat has fostered the careers of many distinguished actors, for example in the World Premiere production of Arthur Miller's The Crucible in 1957, (in two acts) prior to Broadway. In 1960 Sam Waterston and Austin Pendleton starred in Waiting for Godot. The Dramat was the first company to perform Thornton Wilder's one act play, The Long Christmas Dinner.

During the 1970s the company expanded its range and sophistication, with daring productions such as The Frogs, a musical adaptation of the Aristophanes comedy by Stephen Sondheim and Burt Shevelove, staged in the pool of Payne Whitney Gymnasium. Ted Tally, a future Academy Award-winning screenwriter for Silence of the Lambs, starred opposite Alley Mills of television's The Wonder Years. While Meryl Streep trod the boards at the Drama School, Mark Linn-Baker and Robert Picardo delighted audiences on the Dramat stage.

The 1980s saw additional steps forward, with original works by undergraduates such as Tina Landau, class of 1984. Her In the Image of Kings was a provocative treatment of lunatic monarchs. Since then the Dramat has maintained its high standards with both classics and modern masterpieces, musicals, reviews, light operas, and the occasional spoof in the tradition of Porter.

== Administration ==
The Dramat is run by an eleven undergraduate member executive board which oversees the daily business of the Dramat, which includes selecting repertoire for performance and choosing or hiring directors for its productions. The Dramat's membership includes around 100 Yale undergraduates as well as many honorary and life-time members.

The Dramat played a large part in the founding of the Yale School of Drama and the construction of its main facility, the University Theater (also known as the UT).

== Notable alumni ==
- Stewart Alsop, writer and newspaper columnist
- Stephen Vincent Benét, writer
- Peter Bergman, comedian, playwright, founder of the Firesign Theatre
- Dick Cavett, television personality, comedian, and talk show host
- John Conklin, scenic and costume designer
- Bradford Dillman, actor and author
- Jodie Foster, actress
- Paul Giamatti, actor
- August Heckscher II, author and intellectual
- Mark Alan Hewitt, architect and author
- George Roy Hill, film director
- Bill Hinnant, actor
- Skip Hinnant, actor and comedian; Bill's younger brother
- Peter H. Hunt, director, lighting designer
- Lewis A. Lapham, journalist and shipping executive
- Mark Linn-Baker, actor
- Ron Livingston, actor
- Richard Maltby, Jr., Tony Award-winning director and lyricist
- Jefferson Mays, Tony Award-winning actor
- Edward Norton, actor
- Claes Oldenburg, sculptor
- Austin Pendleton, actor, playwright, and director
- Robert Picardo, actor
- Bronson Pinchot, actor
- Cole Porter, composer of musicals
- Philip Proctor, actor, member of the Firesign Theatre
- Sidney Dillon Ripley, secretary of Smithsonian Institution
- Rex Robbins, actor
- David Shire, songwriter and composer (often in collaboration with Richard Maltby as lyricist)
- Ted Tally, screenwriter and playwright
- Alex Timbers, director
- Sonny Tufts, actor
- Sam Waterston, actor
- James Whitmore, actor
- Thornton Wilder, writer
- Monty Woolley, director and actor
