= Donald E. Abelson =

Canadian political scientist

- Occupation: Professor

Academic work
- Discipline: Political scientist
- Sub-discipline: think tanks
- Institutions: McMaster University
- Main interests: Foreign policy in the United States and Canada

Donald E. Abelson is a professor of political science at McMaster University. Abelson has published a number of books and articles dealing with the influence of think tanks on public policy and foreign policy in the United States and Canada. He has been called a "foremost authority on think tanks" in Canada and the United States, and is a regular commentator on his research areas with the CBC and other mass media outlets.

== Career ==
Abelson, whose focus is on American politics, foreign policy, specifically think tanks, is a professor in McMaster University's Department of Political Science. Previously, he served as Director of UWO's Centre for American Studies.

Abelson was appointed as inaugural Director of the Canada-U.S. Institute on March 25, 2010, for an "initial three-year term." He is the author of several books and is a regular commentator on CBC Radio and other media outlets where he discusses current developments in American politics and Canada-U.S. relations.

== Research ==
Abelson's research has focused on public policy, foreign policy in both Canada and the United States. Think tanks are his specific area of interest.

=== Think tanks ===
The influence and number of think tanks increased in the United States in Canada in the 1970s. The mandate of these nonprofit policy research organizations was to produce research and expert analysis to better inform those involved in making public policy. Abelson and others traced how think tanks came to resemble advocacy organizations by promoting ideological perspectives and prescriptive public policy options. In 2012, Abelson described this shift as the emergence of the "advocacy think tank". The Washington Post cited Abelson, who had said that these new think tanks established in Washington, DC "tended to be less scholarly but increasingly political and are more likely to be tied to the fortunes of a party or a wing within a party".

He has examined how think tanks influence public policy and foreign policy in both the United States and Canada. He has been called a "foremost authority on think tanks" in Canada and the United States in the 2013 book Policy Expertise in Contemporary Democracies.

== Publications ==
Abelson is the author of a number of books on foreign policy, think tanks, and political science.

His books include American Think-Tanks and their Role in US Foreign Policy. in 1996, Do Think Tanks Matter? Assessing the Impact of Public Policy Institutes in 2002,

In his 2006 publication A Capitol Idea: Think Tanks and US Foreign Policy , he investigated the way in which American think tanks had "become active and vocal participants in the foreign policy-making process."

In 2002 he co-authored The Myth of the Sacred: The Charter, the Courts, and the politics of the Constitution in Canada with Patrick James and Michael Lusztig.

== Commentator ==
Abelson is invited as a "regular commentator on CBC Radio and other media outlets" on topics such as "current developments in American politics and Canada-U.S. relations".
