= Security studies =

Discipline of international relations

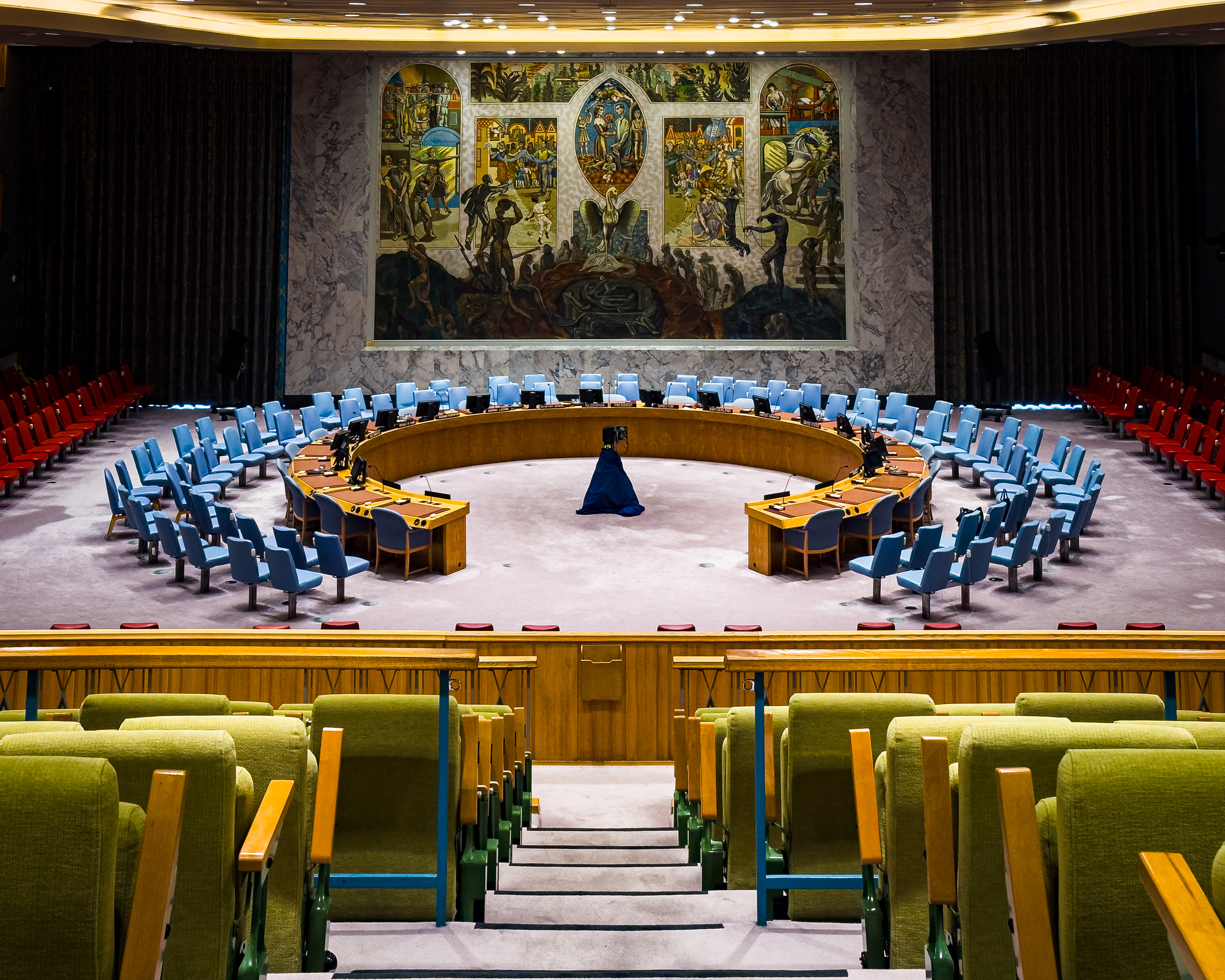
The United Nations Security Council Chamber in New York, also known as the Norwegian Room

Security studies, also known as international security studies, is an academic sub-field within the wider discipline of international relations that studies organized violence, military conflict, national security, and international security.

While the field (much like its parent field of international relations) is often meant to educate students who aspire to professional careers in think tanks, consulting, defense contractors, human rights NGOs or in government service positions focused on diplomacy, foreign policy, conflict resolution and prevention, emergency and disaster management, intelligence, and defense, it can also be tailored to students seeking to professionally conduct academic research within academia, or as public intellectuals, pundits or journalists writing about security policy.

== History ==
The origin of the modern field of security studies has been traced to the period between World War I and World War II. Quincy Wright's 1942 book, Study of War, was the culmination of a major collaborative research project dating back to 1926. Scholars such as William T. R. Fox, Bernard Brodie, Harold Lasswell, Eugene Staley, Jacob Viner, and Vernon Van Dyke were involved in the project. Security studies courses were introduced at Columbia University, Princeton, The University of North Carolina, Northwestern, Yale, and the University of Pennsylvania in the 1940s. Think tanks, such as the RAND Corporation, played an influential role in post-WWII security studies in the United States. The field rapidly developed within international relations during the Cold War, examples from the era including the academic works of mid-20th century realist political scientists such as Thomas Schelling and Henry Kissinger, who focused primarily on nuclear deterrence.

Some scholars have called for expanding security studies to include topics such as economic security, environmental security and public health. Stephen Walt has argued against this expansion, saying it would undermine the field's intellectual coherence. While the field is mostly contained within political science and public policy programs, it is increasingly common to take an interdisciplinary approach, incorporating knowledge from the fields of history, geography (stressing classical geopolitics), military sciences, and criminology.

The field of security studies is related to strategic studies and military science, both of which are frequently published in security studies journals.

== Book series ==
The Cornell Studies in Security Affairs is arguably the leading book series focused on issues in security studies. The 'Studies in Asian Security', by Stanford University Press, is one of the most prominent book series on Asian security studies.

== Journals ==
International Security and Security Studies are the most prominent journals dedicated specifically to security studies. Other security studies journals include:

- African Security
- Armed Forces & Society
- Asian Security
- Civil Wars
- Comparative Strategy
- Conflict Management and Peace Science
- Contemporary Security Policy
- Defence and Peace Economics
- Defence Studies
- European Security
- European Journal of International Security
- Intelligence and National Security
- International Peacekeeping
- Journal of Conflict Resolution
- Journal of Global Security Studies
- Journal of Peace Research
- Journal of Strategic Studies
- Naval War College Review
- Parameters
- Perspectives on Terrorism
- Security Dialogue
- Small Wars & Insurgencies
- Strategic Studies Quarterly (renamed "Æther: A Journal of Strategic Airpower & Spacepower" as from 2022)
- Studies in Conflict and Terrorism
- Survival
- Terrorism and Political Violence
- Texas National Security Review
- The RUSI Journal
- The Washington Quarterly

== See also ==
- Human security
- International relations theory
- International security
- Peace and conflict studies
- Critical security studies
- Feminist security studies
- Strategic studies
- Military science

== Sources ==
- Williams, Paul (2008). Security Studies: An Introduction. Abingdon: Routledge. ISBN 978-0-415-78281-4.
- Rossi, Norma; Riemann, Malte, eds. (2024). Security Studies: An Applied Introduction. London: SAGE. ISBN 9781529615548.
