= John Vasquez =

American political scientist

John A. Vasquez

Academic background
- Education: Boston University (AB, ThM); Syracuse University (PhD)

John A. Vasquez is an American political scientist and the Thomas B. Mackie Scholar in International Relations and Professor of Political Science at the University of Illinois at Urbana–Champaign. He is a former president of International Studies Association.

== Books ==
- Vasquez, J. A. (2018). Contagion and War: Lessons from the First World War. Cambridge University Press.
- Levy, J. S., & Vasquez, J. A. (Eds.) (2014). The Outbreak of the First World War: Structure, Politics, and Decision-Making. Cambridge University Press.
- Vasquez, J. A. (2009). The War Puzzle Revisited. (Cambridge Studies in International Relations). Cambridge University Press.
- Senese, P. D., & Vasquez, J. A. (2008). The Steps to War: An Empirical Study. Princeton University Press.
- Vasquez, J. A. (1999). The Power of Power Politics: From Classical Realism to Neotraditionalism. (Cambridge Studies in International Relations). Cambridge University Press
