= Mediterranean Politics =

- Discipline: Political science
- Language: English
- Edited by: Frédéric Volpi; Sarah Wolff; Matt Buehler

Publication details
- History: 1996–present
- Publisher: Taylor and Francis (United Kingdom)
- Frequency: Quarterly
- Impact factor: 1.844 (2019)

Standard abbreviations
- ISO 4: Mediterr. Politics

Indexing
- ISSN: 1362-9395 (print); 1743-9418 (web)
- LCCN: 97655068
- OCLC no.: 55073226

Links
- Journal homepage; Online archive; Ingentaconnect archive

Mediterranean Politics is a quarterly peer-reviewed academic journal published by Taylor and Francis focusing on research into contemporary politics and international relations in the Mediterranean Sea and the regions surrounding it including the continents of Europe, Africa and Asia. The current editors are Frédéric Volpi (University of Edinburgh), Sarah Wolff (Queen Mary, University of London), and Matt Buehler (University of Tennessee).

According to the Journal Citation Reports, the journal's impact factor was 1.844 in 2019, which moved the journal up to 8/77 in Area Studies, 60/180 in Political Science, and places it 29/95 in International Relations. Previously, its 2018 impact factor was 1.732. This meant that Mediterranean Politics ranked 10/74 in the Area Studies Category, 26/91 in the International Relations Category, and 68/176 in the Political Science Category for that year.

In 2015, the impact factor was 0.741 with a ranking of 16/69 in Area Studies Category, 44/86 in the International Relations Category and 89/163 in the Political Science category. In 2014, the impact factor was 0.696, ranking it 87th out of 161 journals in the category "Political Science", 15th out of 65 journals in the category "Area Studies" and 44th out of 85 journals in the category "International Relations".

The aims and objectives of Mediterranean Politics is to 'shed light on the connectedness of polities and societies and thus takes an interdisciplinary approach which, while generally focused on the disciplines of politics and international relations, is inclusive where appropriate of economics, political economy, human geography, sociology and anthropology'.

== See also ==
- List of political science journals
- List of international relations journals
