= Global Change, Peace & Security =

- Discipline: International relations, Security studies, Peace studies
- Language: English
- Edited by: Lola Akin Ojelabi

Publication details
- History: 1989-present
- Publisher: Routledge
- Frequency: Triannual

Standard abbreviations
- ISO 4: Glob. Change Peace Secur.

Indexing
- ISSN: 1478-1158 (print); 1478-1166 (web)

Links
- Journal homepage

Global Change, Peace & Security (formerly Pacifica Review: Peace, Security & Global Change and Interdisciplinary Peace Research) is a triannual, peer-reviewed, academic journal covering international relations, security studies, and peace studies.

== See also ==
- Journal of Peace Research
