= Banana Boat =

Polish a cappella group

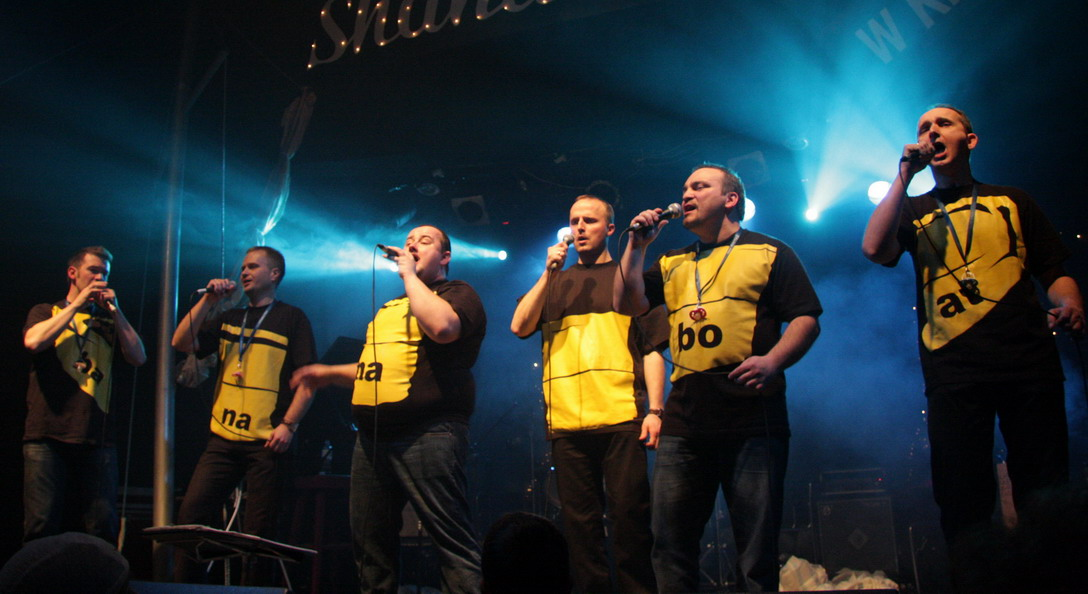
- Banana Boat

Background information
- Origin: Poland
- Genres: A Cappella, Folk music, Sea Shanties, neo-shanty
- Years active: 1994 to present
- Labels: BANANAART.PL
- Members: Maciej Jędrzejko, Paweł Jędrzejko, Paweł Konieczny, Michał Maniara, Wojciech Paluszkiewicz, Piotr Wiśniewski
- Past members: Aleksander Kleszcz, Karol Wierzbicki, Tomasz Czarny
- Website: Official Site
- Best known for: Arktyka (originally written and performed by Banana Boat)

Banana Boat is a Polish a cappella sextet, authoring and performing original songs representing the genre of neo-shanties. Being one of the pioneers of the new genre, the group retains its simultaneous focus on contemporary interpretations of traditional sea shanties and maritime music. Owing to its characteristic six-part, jazzy harmony, departing from the traditional sound of the music of the sea, the group has become one of the emblems of what the international artists of the maritime stage have informally come to dub as the Polish style maritime song. With maritime music constantly in the focus of its activity, since 2004, Banana Boat has also been experimenting with other musical genres, including popular and jazz compositions, inviting other artists to participate in individual projects. The group is a member of the International Seasong and Shanty Association (ISSA).

== History ==
Banana Boat evolved from a multi-member formation Jack Steward, founded by Maciej Jędrzejko and functioning in the years 1993–1994. The line-up of the formation was composed of maritime culture aficionados - high-school students from the city of Sosnowiec, mainly representing the Stanisław Staszic Grammar School in Sosnowiec, the Emilia Plater Grammar School in Sosnowiec, and the Technical High School of Mechanical and Steel Industry in Sosnowiec. The central idea behind the singing youth's efforts was to organize a sailing expedition, whose objective was to circumnavigate Iceland. The musical project itself was intended to encourage teachers to take interest in the richness of maritime culture as an educational resource and - with their help - to gain the support of municipal corporate sponsorship for the idea of the expedition. Even though the Iceland project never came to pass, and Jack Steward ceased to exist in 1994, Maciej Jędrzejko invited Paweł Konieczny, Aleksander Kleszcz and Karol Wierzbicki of the ex-Jack Steward's line-up to help form a new group, which, since 1994, already as an a cappella quartet, adopted the name of Banana Boat. Thus formed, Banana Boat made its debut on the stage of the 1994 Tratwa Festival in Katowice and, subsequently, it gained its early recognition by winning (among others) the Commander Zbyszek Sowiński Award (Tratwa'94), the Main Prize of the 1994 edition of the Prosiak Festival and an honorary mention by the jury of the 1996 edition of the Shanties Festival in Cracow, Poland.

In the years 1996–1998, the group - whose members, by then, had commenced their university education - suspended its activity, only to return to the maritime stages of Poland by the end of 1998. At this stage, Banana Boat made its name as an a cappella quintet, which - reinforced by the former bass singer of the Polish group North Cape, Piotr "Qdyś" Wiśniewski - transformed into the present-day sextet at the turn of 2008 and 2009. In February 2023, Wojciech Paluszkiewicz (formerly of the Pearls and Rascals) joined the Banana Boat as its new baritone singer. Two years later, in February 2025, Tomasz Czarny, the long-term Banana Boat composer, arranger, and vocalist, retired from performing with the band. Since 1998, the group has been awarded the most important prizes of the Polish festivals of maritime music, recorded four albums and a toplist single, and participated in numerous collective projects. Currently, Banana Boat gives concerts and recitals in Europe and outside of it, performing both for the audiences of small-audience clubs and those of large international festivals.

== Banana Boat Members ==
Today, Banana Boat consists of the following musicians:

- Maciej Jędrzejko|Maciej "YenJCo." Jędrzejko, the group's founder, frontman and leader;
- Paweł "Konik" Konieczny, the formation's co-founder, composer and high tenor;
- Paweł Jędrzejko ("Synchro"), the author of the majority of the band's original lyrics and performer of bari-tenor parts;
- Michał "Ociec" Maniara, the manager of the BananaArt.Pl Art Agency (the Banana Boat label) and performer of baritone parts;
- Wojciech "Paluch" Paluszkiewicz, the Banana Boat's arranger, composer and bari-tenor;
- Piotr "Qdyś" Wiśniewski, the group's bass singer.

The present-day Banana Boat members are yachtsmen: Paweł Jędrzejko (formerly a professional navigator), holds an ocean-going yachtmaster's licence; his younger brother Maciej, the group's founder, is an ocean skipper, while other Banana Boat members all hold offshore licenses, which contributes to the positive reception of the Banana Boat songs. Professionally, the Banana Boat musicians represent such disciplines as medicine and dentistry, construction engineering, mechanical engineering, business and trade, and academic literary and culture studies.

== Organizational, propagatory and charitable activity ==
- In the years 2002-2007 Banana Boat, working in collaboration with the Municipal Cultural Center in Łaziska Górne (Poland), acted as the organizer of the International Festival of Seasong and Shanty "Zęza";
- In 2006, the groups participated in an all-Polish charity project To See the Sea, the proceeds from which supported the medical treatment of Polish shantymen in need;
- In 2008, Maciej Jędrzejko, the group's leader, was appointed as the artistic director of the International Festival World Music Fusion - Euroszanty & Folk in Sosnowiec (Poland);
- Every year, Banana Boat participates in the charity events of the Great Orchestra of Christmas Charity;
- Maciej Jędrzejko is the founder and Editor-in-Chief of the "Free Sea-Shanty Portal Szantymaniak.Pl" and Editor-in-Chief of the "Szantymaniak Magazine" (in Polish);
- Each year, individual members of the group are appointed as jurors of sea-song festivals; they regularly offer workshops to other musicians of the Polish maritime stage and sea-song fans.
- Banana Boat regularly participated in the now discontinued charity educational program "Tunes to Teens," sponsored by Contemporary A Cappella Society of America.

== Concerts and international cooperation ==
Apart from numerous concerts in Poland, Banana Boat has performed in the Czech Republic (Fulnek), in Italy (Ravenna), in France (Paimpol; Chateau-Thierry, Essômes-sur-Marne, Bugueles, Douarnenez, Brest, Orléans, L'île d'Oléron), in Ireland (Cork/Cobh), in the United States (New York, Bay City), in the Netherlands (Appingedam; Oudewater; Rotterdam), in Belgium (Mouscron), in Ukraine (Lviv), in Germany (Bremen-Vegesack) and many other locations. As a member of ISSA, the group collaborates with international artists associated within the organization. In 2008, songs by Banana Boat were published on albums of a collective charity project Lafitte's Return (USA). Banana Boat's music has been broadcast by numerous radio stations in Europe and beyond. In the beginning of the year 2009 the group has finalized miniproject entitled A Little A Cappella - Polish-Irish Harmony in partnership with the Irish star of the musical stage, Eleanor McEvoy. The song "Little Look," (written and composed by Eleanor McEvoy and arranged by Tomasz Czarny) entered the most prestigious Polish hitlist, Lista Przebojów Programu Trzeciego, immediately after the single had been released.

== Awards and prizes ==
Apart from numerous Grand Prix awards, First Prizes and Audience's Favorite's Prizes awarded by the jury panels and audiences of all of the most important maritime music festivals in Poland, Banana Boat has become a double first runner-up for the CARA Award of the Contemporary A Cappella Society of America in the categories of The Best World/Folk Album 2005 (for the album A morze tak, a może nie...) and The Best World/Folk Song 2005 (for the song "Arktyka" of the mentioned album). In 2016, the group's 2015 minialbum Aquareal was named the first runner up for the 2015 CARA Award in the same category.

== Discography ==
=== Long-playing albums (LPs) ===
- Banana Boat, Ono, BananaArt.pl, 2025.
- Banana Boat, A morze tak, a może nie, BananaArt.pl, 2004

=== Extended-play albums (EPs) ===
- Banana Boat, Aquareal, BananaArt.pl, 2015
- Banana Boat, Banana Boat... Świątecznie (Christmas EP), BananaArt.pl, 2004

=== Maxi-Single ===
- Banana Boat feat. Eleanor McEvoy, A Little A Cappella: A Polish-Irish Harmony, BananaArt.pl, 2009

=== Songs on international compilations by various artists ===
- Die schönsten Shantys und Seemannslieder, EGM Medien Produktion (Germany), 2011 – songs “Day-Oh!” (“Banana Boat Song”) and “Les filles des forges” .
- Festival du Chant de Marin, Fête du Chant de Marin de Paimpol (France), 2011 song: “Banana Boat Song”
- Lafitte’s Return, vol. 4, Pirates for the Preservation of New Orleans Music (USA), 2008, song „Arktyka” (the total proceeds support the musical education of the post-Katrina New Orleans (2008))
- Lafitte’s Return, vol. 3, Pirates for the Preservation of New Orleans Music (USA), 2008, song: „Nowy Świat” (the total proceeds support the musical education of the post-Katrina New Orleans (2008))
- Bie Daip 09, International Shantyfestival Bie Diep, Appingedam (Netherlands), 2009, song: „Zęza”

=== Songs featuring on albums by individual international artists ===
- Eleanor McEvoy, I’d Rather Go Blonde, Mosco Disc (Ireland), 2010, utwór: “Little Look”

=== Collaboration in recordings and songs featuring on Polish compilation albums ===
- A Few Days 4 Qnia, (single), Perły i Łotry, North Cape, Banana Boat, Ryczące Dwudziestki, Formacja, Trzecia Miłość, Stonehenge. Produced by: Perły i Łotry, 2021.
- Bo to Morze moje jest..., Krakowska Fundacja Żeglarstwa, Sportu i Turystyki HALS, 2016, song: „Z oceanem sam na sam”.
- 30 lat Shanties, Krakowska Fundacja Żeglarstwa, Sportu i Turystyki HALS, 2012, song: „Arktyka”.
- Lista przebojów Programu Trzeciego – prezentuje Piotr Baron, EMI Music Poland, 2009, song: “Little Look” (with Eleanor McEvoy).
- Pamiętam tamte mewy... Tomek Opoka, Stowarzyszenie Literacko-Muzyczne Ballada, 2009 – song: „Niosę jeszcze swe wiersze”.
- Zobaczyć morze – szantymeni szantymenom, Fundacja Gniazdo Piratów, 2006, song: „Nawigator” (a charity project).
- XXV-lecie Shanties (część 1), Krakowska Fundacja Żeglarstwa, Sportu i Turystyki HALS, 2006, song: „A morze tak, a może nie”.
- XXV-lecie Shanties (część 2), Krakowska Fundacja Żeglarstwa, Sportu i Turystyki HALS, 2006, song: „Zęza”.
- Szanty z Sercem, PPP 2006, songs "Nowy świat" and "Arktyka" (charity project ).
- Szanty dla Pajacyka, MCK Tychy, 2002, songs: „Requiem dla nieznajomych przyjaciół”, „Do Calais!”, and collaborative performance of songs: „Więcej żagli”, „London River”, and „Szantymen” with other participating artists (charity project).

=== Songs featuring on the albums by other Polish artists ===
- Carrantuohill, Carrantuohill „25”, Celt & Polskie Radio, 2013, song: “Little Look” (with Eleanor McEvoy).
- Carrantuohill, Carrantuohill „25”, Celt & Polskie Radio, 2012, song: “Little Look” (with Eleanor McEvoy).

== See also ==
- A cappella
- Sea shanty

== Literature of the subject ==
- Jerzy S. Łątka, Rozfalowana ziemia. Dzieje ruchu szantowego w Polsce [Wavy Earth: The History of the Sea-Shanty Movement in Poland], Kraków: Towarzystwo Słowaków w Polsce, 2007
- Pat Sheridan, "A New Musical Idiom. Poland: World leaders in the preservation and promotion of maritime music?" In: Ferment, 2008
- Assorted articles in the Szantymaniak Magazine
- Jędrzejko, P. (2015). Traces in the Ocean. On Melville, Wolanowski, and Willing Suspension of Disbelief. Review of International American Studies, 8(1), 103–119. [An article discussing, among others, the phenomenon of the "neo-shanty”; the author cites bands such as Banana Boat as examples of the contemporary a cappella formations cultivating the traditions of the traditional sea-songs, yet in a new, stage-oriented, formula.] Full text online
- Korzon, A. (2009, 21 sierpnia). Muzyczne porozumienie ponad granicami. Wiadomości24.pl. [A press article describing the international musical project "Little Look” by Banana Boat and the Irish star Eleanor McEvoy, as an example of successful international collaboration among artists.]
- Marzenia są dla odważnych • Banana Boat 20 lat (Dreams are For the Brave • Banana Boat 20 Years After), Szanty24.pl. Accessed 2025-03-12. (Article in the Szanty24.pl portal, describing the history of Banana Boat on the occasion of its 20th anniversary.)
- Banana Boat - szanty a cappella, Gazeta Wyborcza. Accessed 2025-03-12. (Article in Gazeta Wyborcza describing Banana Boat and its artistic output.)
- Banana Boat, Pismo Folkowe. Accessed 2025-03-12. (Article in Pismo Folkowe presenting the history of Banana Boat and its artistic profile.)
- Od miłości się zaczęło (It All Started with Love), Gazeta Uniwersytecka UŚ. Accessed 2025-03-12. (An interview with Paweł Jędrzejko, Banana Boat member, on the beginnings of the band.)
