= Steps to war =

Theory in international relations

The steps-to-war explanation is a theory of international relations based on the issue paradigm that empirically establishes the war-proneness of territorial issues and the use of power politics practices. The framework is established by Paul D. Senese and John A. Vasquez in the 2008 book The Steps to War: An Empirical Study, though many of the key insights, such as the role of alliances, arms races, and territory in promoting escalation of disputes to war, have been elaborated in previous works. The steps-to-war explanation makes two major contributions to the war literature. First, it shows that not all disputes are equally likely to escalate to war. In particular, it presents a theoretical and empirical case for the war-proneness of territorial disputes. Second, the theory demonstrates that the very power politics practices that political realists claim prevent war increase its probability of occurring.

== Theory ==
The steps-to-war framework posits an underlying and proximate cause of war. The chief underlying cause of war is the existence of a territorial dispute. Disputes over territory are less likely to be resolved than disputes over other issues, and given their salient and transcendental nature, can be expected to create hardline interest groups and recurrent conflict. The proximate cause of war is the use of power politics, such as alliances and arms races, that leaders are told to use by the dominant realist folklore. By handling issues in this manner, states increase threat perception and hostility on the other, furthering entrenching hardliners and therefore reducing the probability of a compromise.
