= Oliver Stuenkel =

Political commentator

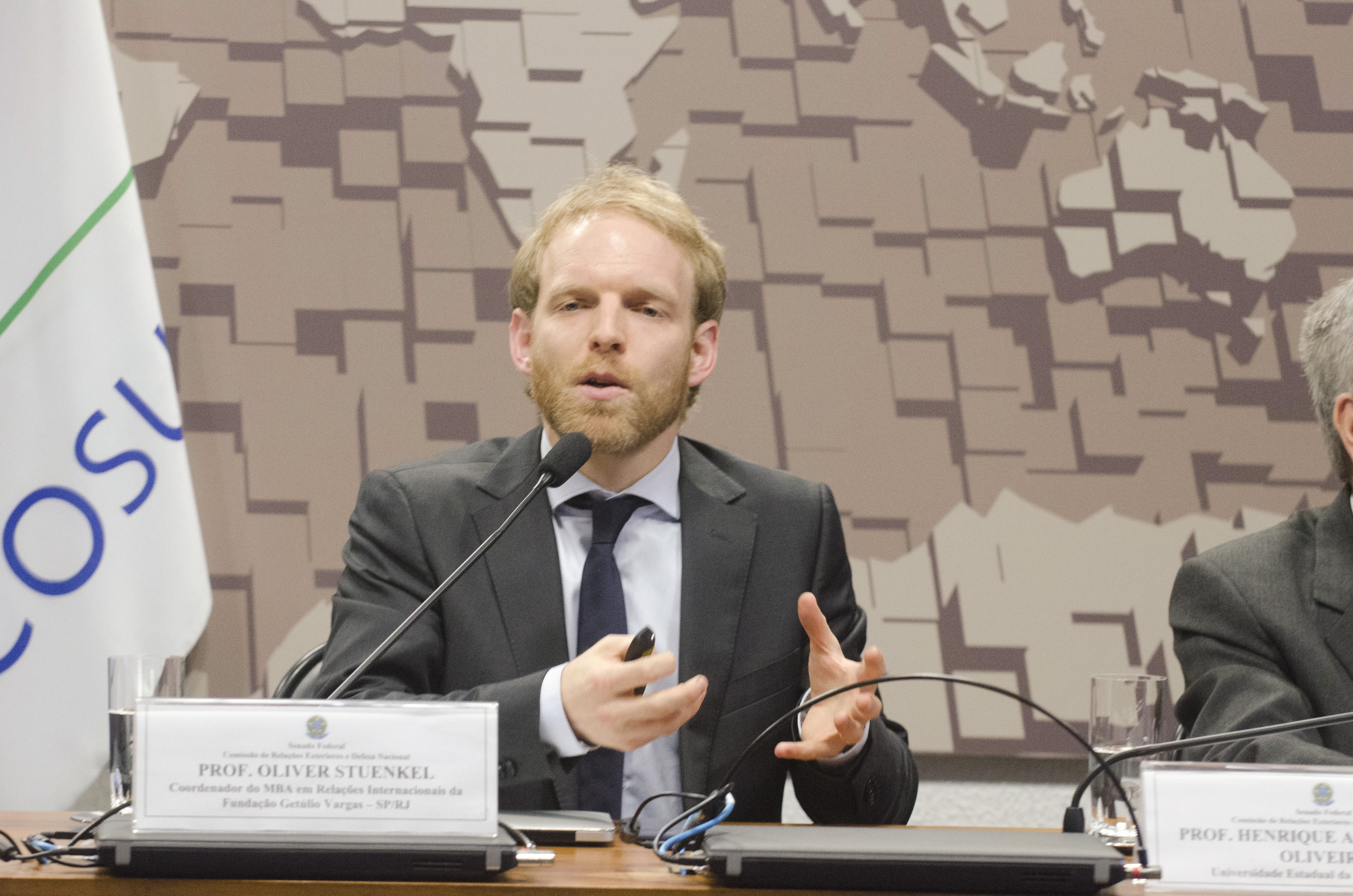
- Born: April 16, 1982 (age 44); Düsseldorf, West Germany
- Citizenship: German; Brazilian
- Education: University of Valencia (BA); Harvard University (MPP); University of Duisburg-Essen (PhD)
- Organization: Fundação Getulio Vargas
- Notable work: Post-Western World: How Emerging Powers Are Remaking the Global Order; BRICS and the Future of the Global Order
- Title: Associate Professor

Oliver Stuenkel (born 16 April 1982) is a German-Brazilian political scientist and writer. He is a Senior Fellow in the Democracy, Conflict, and Governance Program at the Carnegie Endowment for International Peace in Washington, D.C., a Non-Resident Fellow at the Belfer Center for Science and International Affairs at Harvard Kennedy School, and an associate professor at the School of International Relations of the Fundação Getulio Vargas (FGV) in São Paulo, Brazil. He is also a non-resident fellow at the Global Public Policy Institute (GPPi) in Berlin.

His research focuses on geopolitics and the global order, emerging powers, Brazilian foreign policy, and Latin American politics and democracy. He is the author of The BRICS and the Future of Global Order (2015; second edition 2020) and Post-Western World: How Emerging Powers Are Remaking Global Order (2016). Both books have been published in Chinese and Portuguese editions, and Post-Western World has also appeared in Persian.

Stuenkel is a columnist for Foreign Policy and the Brazilian newspaper O Estado de S. Paulo, and a frequent commentator on Brazilian television and radio. He was a columnist for El País from 2016 to 2021 and a contributing columnist for Americas Quarterly until 2024. His articles have appeared in Foreign Affairs, The New York Times and the Financial Times, among other publications. In 2024 he co-authored, with Alexander Gabuev, the Foreign Affairs essay "The Battle for the BRICS".

He has testified before the U.S.-China Economic and Security Review Commission (2021) and given evidence to the International Relations and Defence Committee of the House of Lords (2026). He is a member of the advisory committee of the Americas Division of Human Rights Watch and serves on the editorial boards of Global Summitry (Oxford University Press) and the Journal of BRICS Studies (University of Johannesburg).

== Education ==
Stuenkel earned his undergraduate degree from the University of Valencia, a Master in Public Policy from Harvard Kennedy School, and a PhD in political science from the University of Duisburg-Essen.

== Career ==
Before joining FGV, Stuenkel held visiting positions at the University of São Paulo, Jawaharlal Nehru University in New Delhi, and LUISS in Rome. He was a non-resident scholar at the Carnegie Endowment for International Peace from 2021 and became a Senior Fellow there in 2024. He joined the Belfer Center as a Visiting Scholar in 2024 and is now a Non-Resident Fellow.

== Bibliography ==
=== Books ===
- India-Brazil-South Africa Dialogue Forum (IBSA): The Rise of the Global South? London: Routledge, 2014. ISBN 9781138789081.
- The BRICS and the Future of Global Order. Lanham, MD: Lexington Books, 2015; 2nd ed. 2020. ISBN 9781498567275.
- Brazil on the Global Stage: Power, Ideas, and the Liberal International Order (co-edited with Matthew M. Taylor). New York: Palgrave Macmillan, 2015. ISBN 9781137491640.
- Post-Western World: How Emerging Powers Are Remaking Global Order. Cambridge: Polity, 2016. ISBN 9781509504565.
- Índia na Ordem Global (editor). Rio de Janeiro: Editora FGV, 2014. ISBN 9788522514120.

==== Translations ====
- BRICS e o futuro da ordem global. Rio de Janeiro: Paz e Terra, 2017 (Portuguese). ISBN 9788577533602.
- 金砖国家与全球秩序的未来 [The BRICS and the Future of Global Order]. Shanghai: Shanghai People's Publishing House, 2017 (Chinese). ISBN 9787208147010.
- 中国之治终结西方时代 [Post-Western World]. Beijing: China Friendship Publishing Company / Beijing Mediatime Books, 2017 (Chinese). ISBN 9787505742055.
- O mundo pós-ocidental: potências emergentes e a nova ordem global. Rio de Janeiro: Zahar, 2018 (Portuguese). ISBN 9788537817629.
- جهان پساغربی [Post-Western World], translated by Davoud Rezaei Eskandari. Tehran: Institute for Political and International Studies (IPIS), 2020 (Persian). ISBN 9789643619589.
