= International Studies Association =

American professional association

- Abbreviation: ISA
- Formation: 1959
- Type: Nonprofit
- Tax ID no.: 87-0485763
- Legal status: Public charity
- Headquarters: University of Connecticut, Storrs, Connecticut, US
- Executive director: M. J. Bosia (as of 2025)
- Website: www.isanet.org

The International Studies Association (ISA) is a US-based professional association for scholars and practitioners in the field of international studies. It publishes several journals.Its annual convention routinely draws over 6,000 attendees.

== History ==
The ISA is a professional association for scholars and practitioners in the field of international studies.It was founded in 1959. It has been a member of the International Science Council since 1984.

In 2014, ISA came under criticism for a proposed ban on blogging by its journals' editors.

It has been headquartered at the University of Connecticut in Storrs since 2015.

In 2020 ISA had more than 7,000 members in over 100 countries. It describes itself as "one of the oldest interdisciplinary associations dedicated to understanding international, transnational and global affairs." ISA encompasses six geographic subdivisions (regions), 29 thematic groups (sections), and four caucuses, providing opportunities to exchange ideas and research with local colleagues and within specific subject areas.

As of 2025 the ISA's executive director is M. J. Bosia.

== Awards and prizes ==
The ISA awards a large number of prizes, including the Alexander George Award (since 1990), the Carl Beck Award (since 1980), the Quincy Writer Award, the J. Ann Tickner Award, and many others.

Since 1981, the ISA has awarded the Karl Deutsch Award to scholars under age 40 or within ten years of defending their doctoral dissertation.

== Publications ==
ISA publishes seven academic journals (International Studies Quarterly, International Studies Review, International Studies Perspectives, Foreign Policy Analysis, International Political Sociology, Journal of Global Security Studies, and Global Studies Quarterly), all currently published by Oxford University Press, and co-sponsors an eighth (International Interactions). ISA also publishes the Oxford Research Encyclopedia of International Studies in conjunction with Oxford University Press and maintains other online resources.

Publication	Founded	Focus
International Studies Quarterly	1959	flagship, "theoretical, empirical, and normative subjects in international studies"
International Studies Review	1957	"current trends and research in international studies worldwide"
International Studies Perspectives	2000	pedagogy, policy, practice
Foreign Policy Analysis	2005	foreign policy analysis, "foreign policy decisions, processes, actions, and outcomes"
International Political Sociology	2007	political sociology, for sociologists, international relations scholars and sociopolitical theorists
Journal of Global Security Studies	2016	"global security and global aspects of debates in security studies"
Global Studies Quarterly	2021	"theoretical, epistemological, empirical or normative contribution" to global studies

Global Studies Quarterly is a quarterly peer-reviewed open-access academic journal covering research across the broad field of international studies, including global politics, economics, society, and culture. It was established in 2021 is and is published by Oxford University Press on behalf of the International Studies Association. The editors-in-chief are Brent J. Steele (University of Utah) and Jelena Subotić (Georgia State University). The journal is abstracted and indexed in the Directory of Open Access Journals, EBSCO databases, ProQuest databases, and Scopus.

== Presidents ==
This is the list of ISA presidents:

1. Minos Generales (1959–1961)
2. Wesley Posvar (1961–1962)
3. Fred Sondermann (1962–1963)
4. Ross Berkes (1963–1964)
5. John Grange (1964–1966)
6. Vernon Van Dyke (1966–1967)
7. F. Field Haviland Jr. (1967–1968)
8. William Olson (1968–1969)
9. Robert North (1969–1970)
10. Norman Palmer (1970–1971)
11. Richard C. Snyder (1971–1972)
12. William T.R. Fox (1972–1973)
13. Alexander George (1973–1974)
14. Kenneth Boulding (1974–1975)
15. Richard Rosecrance (1975–1976)
16. Vincent Davis (1976–1977)
17. Herbert Kelman (1977–1978)
18. Chadwick F. Alger (1978–1979)
19. Ole Holsti (1979–1980)
20. Dina Zinnes (1980–1981)
21. Henry Teune (1981–1982)
22. Harold K. Jacobson (1982–1983)
23. Bruce Russett (1983–1984)
24. James N. Rosenau (1984–1985)
25. J. David Singer (1985–1986)
26. Kal J. Holsti (1986–1987)
27. Harold Guetzkow (1987–1988)
28. Robert Keohane (1988–1989)
29. Charles F. Hermann (1989–1990)
30. Helga Haftendorn (1990–1991)
31. Maurice East (1991–1992)
32. Hayward R. Alker Jr. (1992–1993)
33. Charles Kegley Jr. (1993–1994)
34. Ted R. Gurr (1994–1995)
35. Susan Strange (1995–1996)
36. Davis Bobrow (1996–1997)
37. James A. Caporaso (1997–1998)
38. Margaret G. Hermann (1998–1999)
39. Michael Brecher (1999–2000)
40. Craig Murphy (2000–2001)
41. Bruce Bueno de Mesquita (2001–2002)
42. John A. Vasquez (2002–2003)
43. Steve Smith (2003–2004)
44. Jacek Kugler (2004–2005)
45. William Thompson (2005–2006)
46. J. Ann Tickner (2006–2007)
47. Jack Levy (2007–2008)
48. Nils Petter Gleditsch (2008–2009)
49. Thomas G. Weiss (2009–2010)
50. David A. Lake (2010–2011)
51. Beth Simmons (2011–2012)
52. Etel Solingen (2012–2013)
53. Harvey Starr (2013–2014)
54. Amitav Acharya (2014–2015)
55. Paul Diehl (2015–2016)
56. T. V. Paul (2016–2017)
57. Brett Ashley Leeds (2017–2018)
58. Patrick James (2018–2019)
59. Cameron G. Thies (2019–2020)
60. Helen V. Milner (2020–2021)
61. Kristian Skrede Gleditsch (2021–2022)
62. Deborah Avant (2022–2023)
63. Laura J. Shepherd (2023–2024)
64. Marijke Breuning (2024–2025)
65. Audie Klotz (2025–2026)

== See also ==
- List of international relations journals
