= Patrick James (professor) =

Patrick James (born 1957), was Professor of International Relations at the University of Southern California in Los Angeles, CA, and Director of the USC Center for International Studies. He now works as a nonresident fellow at the University of Georgia.

== Education ==
James received his B.A. with honours in history at the University of Western Ontario in 1978, and a Ph.D. in government and politics from the University of Maryland, College Park in 1984.

== Professional career ==
His first positions were as lecturer in Government and Politics at the University of Maryland, College Park, and as an Assistant Professor of Public Policy at the University of Manitoba. After receiving his Ph.D. in 1984, he worked at McGill University as an Assistant and then Associate Professor of Political Science from 1984 to 1991. He then served as a Professor of Political Science at Florida State University from 1991 to 1994. From 1994 until 1998, he was chair of the Political Science Department at Iowa State University, then as Professor of Political Science there from 1999 to 2001. He then went to the University of Missouri as Professor of Political Science from 2001 until 2004, becoming the Frederick A. Middlebush Professor of Political Science from 2004 to 2005. Since 2005, he has been Professor of International Relations at the University of Southern California, as well as the Director of the Center for International Studies. As of 2025, he now serves as a non-resident fellow at the University of Georgia School of Public and International Affairs.

He has taught in several other fields over the course of his professional life. These fields include International Relations, Comparative Politics, Rational Choice, and Empirical Methods. He specialized in fields such as conflict, crisis and war, Canadian politics, collective action, expected utility and game theory, and research design and statistics.

== Honours and awards ==
- Vice President, ISA, 2008–09
- Distinguished Scholar in Foreign Policy Analysis, International Studies Association (ISA), 2007.
- Delegate, The US Delegation of Scholars to Taiwan, 2007.
- President, Association for Canadian Studies in the United States (ACSUS), 2007-09.
- Eaton Lecturer, Centre of Canadian Studies, Queen’s University, Belfast, Northern Ireland, November, 2002.
- Senior Fellowship in Canadian Studies, Canadian Embassy, Washington, DC, 2001-02.
- Thomas O. Enders Professor of Canadian Studies, University of Calgary, 2000-2001.
- Lady Davis Professor of International Relations, Hebrew University of Jerusalem, 1999.
- President, International Studies Association (Midwest), 1999-2000,
- President, Iowa Conference of Political Scientists, 1998-99.
- Milton R. Merrill Chair in Political Science, 1996–97, Utah State University.
- Hoover Institution on War, Revolution and Peace, Stanford, California, Susan Louise Dyer Peace Fellowship, 1991-1992.
- Canadian Representative, Annual Conference on International Peace, Institute of International Peace Studies, Kyung Hee University, Seoul, Korea, June, 1991.
- Commentator on Canadian foreign policy, CJAD radio, April, September, November, 1988.
- PSSA Professor of the Year, 1987.
- Commentator on World Politics, CBC Radio, September 1985.
- Consultant, U.S. Department of State, Institute for Political Training, 1980-83.

== Publications ==
James has 333 citations of his published works from 1985 to 2003, including books, symposia, articles, chapters in books, reviews, miscellaneous entries, manuscripts, and conference papers and presentations.

=== Books ===
- Canada and Conflict. Don Mills, Ont: Oxford University Press, 2012.
- Religion, identity, and global governance : ideas, evidence and practice Toronto : University of Toronto Press, 2011
- (with Annette Freyberg-Inan and Ewan Harrison, eds.) Rethinking Realism in International Relations: Between Tradition and Innovation. (Baltimore, MD: Johns Hopkins University Press, 2009).
- Constitutional politics in Canada after the Charter : liberalism, communitarianism, and systemismVancouver : UBC Press, 2010.
- (with Mark Kasoff, eds.) Canadian Studies in the New Millennium (Toronto: University of Toronto Press, 2008).
- (with Nelson Michaud Marc O’Reilly, eds.) Handbook of Canadian Foreign Policy (Lanham, MD: Lexington Books, 2006).
- (with David Carment and Zeynep Taydas) Who Intervenes? Ethnic Conflict and Interstate Crisis. (Columbus, OH: Ohio State University Press, 2006).
- (with Seung-Whan Choi) A New Quest for International Peace: Civil-Military Dynamics, Political Communications and Democracy. (New York, NY: Palgrave, 2005).
- International Relations and Scientific Progress: Structural Realism Reconsidered (Columbus, OH: Ohio State University Press, 2002).
- (with Donald E. Abelson and Michael Lusztig, eds.) The Myth of the Sacred: The Charter, the Courts and the Politics of the Constitution in Canada (Montreal and Kingston: McGill-Queen’s Press, 2002).
- (with David Goetze, eds.) Evolutionary Theory and Ethnic Conflict (Westport, CT: Praeger, 2001). In over 450 libraries according to WorldCat
- (with David Carment, eds.) Peace in the Midst of Wars: Preventing and Managing International Ethnic Conflicts (Columbia, SC: University of South Carolina Press, 1998).
- (with David Carment, eds.) Wars in the Midst of Peace: The International Politics of Ethnic Conflict (Pittsburgh, Pennsylvania: University of Pittsburgh Press, 1997).
- (with William James Booth and Hudson Meadwell, eds) Politics and Rationality (Cambridge: Cambridge University Press, 1993).
- Crisis and War (Montreal and Kingston: McGill-Queen's University Press, 1988). In over 400 libraries according to WorldCat
- (with Michael Brecher) Crisis and Change in World Politics (Boulder, Colorado: Westview Press, 1986).

=== Articles and book chapters ===
He has published over 75 articles in peer-reviewed journals a number of book chapters, and a great many book reviews, conference presentations, lectures, and other items.
