= Survival (journal) =

- Discipline: International relations
- Language: English
- Edited by: Dana Allin

Publication details
- History: 1959–present
- Publisher: Taylor & Francis for the International Institute for Strategic Studies (United Kingdom)
- Frequency: Bimonthly
- Impact factor: 0.474 (2015)

Standard abbreviations
- ISO 4: Survival

Indexing
- ISSN: 0039-6338 (print); 1468-2699 (web)
- LCCN: 64005423
- OCLC no.: 642473660

Links
- Journal homepage; Online access; Online archive; Ingenta Connect archive

Survival is a scholarly international studies journal of the International Institute for Strategic Studies, the British international affairs research institute. It is published by Taylor & Francis and has six issues a year. It was established in 1959 and the editor is Dana Allin (International Institute for Strategic Studies).

== Abstracting and indexing ==
The journal is abstracted and indexed in:

- Columbia International Affairs Online
- CSA Worldwide Political Science Abstracts
- Current Contents/Social & Behavioural Sciences
- Military Policy Research
- Social Sciences Citation Index
- PAIS International
- Periodicals Contents Index
- World Affairs Online

According to the Journal Citation Reports, the journal has a 2015 impact factor of 0.474, ranking it 121st out of 163 journals in the category "Political Science" and 68th out of 86 in the category "International Relations".

== See also ==
- List of international relations journals
