= Richard C. Snyder =

American political scientist (1916–1997)

Richard C. Snyder (21 August 1916 – 9 December 1997) was an American political scientist who specialized in foreign policy.

== Life and career ==
Snyder graduated from Union College in 1937 and earned his doctorate in 1945 from Columbia University. He then took a position at the Council on Foreign Relations.

He taught political science at Princeton University from 1946 to 1955, then was appointed Northwestern University political science department chair. From 1965 to 1970, Snyder served as dean and professor of administration and political science at University of California, Irvine and chaired the political science panel of the California Social Science Study Commission. He served as president of the International Studies Association from 1971 to 1972. He ended his career as director of the Mershon Center at Ohio State University.

Snyder died in Scottsdale, Arizona.

== Selected publications ==
- The Most Favored Nation Clause
- American Foreign Policy
- Roots of Political Behavior
