= Conflict Management and Peace Science =

Academic journal

- Discipline: International relations, peace and conflict studies
- Language: English
- Edited by: Margherita Belgioioso, Daina Chiba, Wakako Maekawa, Marius Mehrl

Publication details
- Former name: Journal of Peace Science
- History: 1973-present
- Publisher: SAGE Publications
- Frequency: 6/year
- Impact factor: 2.563 (2020)

Standard abbreviations
- ISO 4: Confl. Manag. Peace Sci.

Indexing
- ISSN: 0738-8942 (print); 1549-9219 (web)
- LCCN: 83644168
- OCLC no.: 8055590

Links
- Journal homepage; Online access; Online archive

Conflict Management and Peace Science is a peer-reviewed academic journal appearing five times a year that publishes scholarly articles and book reviews in the field of international relations (specifically peace and conflict studies) on topics such as international conflict, arms races, international trade, foreign policy, international mediation, and conflict resolution. The journal is published under the auspices of the Peace Science Society. The journal includes original and review articles.

== Abstracting and indexing ==
Conflict Management and Peace Science is abstracted and indexed in Current Abstracts, Scopus, and the Social Sciences Citation Index. According to the Journal Citation Reports, its 2016 impact factor is 1.608, ranking it 23rd out of 86 journals in the category "International Relations".
