= Foreign Policy Analysis (journal) =

Academic journal

- Discipline: Political science
- Language: English
- Edited by: Klaus Brummer; Brian Lai

Publication details
- History: 2005-present
- Publisher: Oxford University Press and Wiley-Blackwell on behalf of the International Studies Association
- Frequency: Quarterly
- Impact factor: 1.386 (2017)

Standard abbreviations
- ISO 4: Foreign Policy Anal.

Indexing
- ISSN: 1743-8586 (print); 1743-8594 (web)
- LCCN: 2005256012
- OCLC no.: 58437092

Links
- Journal homepage; Online access (Oxford); Online archive (Oxford); Online access (W-B); Online archive (W-B)

Foreign Policy Analysis is a quarterly peer-reviewed academic journal published by Oxford University Press on behalf of the International Studies Association. The journal was established in 2005. The current editors-in-chief are Klaus Brummer (Catholic University of Eichstätt-Ingolstadt, Germany) and Brian Lai (University of Iowa, USA). The journal covers the process, effects, causes, and outputs of foreign policy decision-making in both comparative and case-specific manners.

According to the Journal Citation Reports, the journal has a 2017 impact factor of 1.386.
