= Foreign policy analysis =

Branch of political science

Foreign policy analysis (FPA) is a technique within the international relations sub-field of political science dealing with theory, development, and empirical study regarding the processes and outcomes of foreign policy.

FPA is the study of the management of external relations and activities of state. Foreign policy involves goals, strategies, measures, management methods, guidelines, directives, agreements, and so on. National governments may conduct international relations not only with other nation-states but also with international organizations and non-governmental organizations.

Managing foreign relations need carefully considered plans of actions that are adapted to foreign interests and concerns of the government.

== Study ==
Foreign policy analysis (FPA) involves the study of how a state makes foreign policy. As it analyzes the decision making process, FPA involves the study of both international and domestic politics. FPA also draws upon the study of diplomacy, war, intergovernmental organizations, and economic sanctions, each of which are means by which a state may implement foreign policy. In academia, FPA is most commonly taught within the discipline of public policy within political science or political studies, and the study of international relations. FPA can also be considered a sub-field of the study of international relations (IR), which aims to understand the processes behind foreign policy decision making. The most prominent scholars in this field of study include Richard Snyder, James Rosenau, Alexander George, Graham Allison and Irving Janis.

According to foreignpolicyanalysis.org, "As a field of study, FPA is characterized by its actor-specific focus. In the simplest terms, it is the study of the process, effects, causes, or outputs of foreign policy decision-making in either a comparative or case-specific manner. The underlying and often implicit argument theorizes that human beings, acting as a group or within a group, compose and cause change in international politics." In other words, FPA can be understood as a critique of the dominant structuralist approaches in IR.

== Stages in decision making ==
The making of foreign policy involves a number of stages:

- Assessment of the international and domestic political environment - Foreign policy is made and implemented within an international and domestic political context, which must be understood by a state in order to determine the best foreign policy option. For example, a state may need to respond to an international crisis.
- Goal setting - A state has multiple foreign policy goals. A state must determine which goal is affected by the international and domestic political environment at any given time. In addition, foreign policy goals may conflict, which will require the state to prioritize.
- Determination of policy options - A state must then determine what policy options are available to meet the goal or goals set in light of the political environment. This will involve an assessment of the state's capacity implement policy options and an assessment of the consequences of each policy option.
- Formal decision making action - A formal foreign policy decision will be taken at some level within a government. Foreign policy decisions are usually made by the executive branch of government. Common governmental actors or institutions which make foreign policy decisions include: the head of state (such as a president) or head of government (such as a prime minister), cabinet, or minister.
- Implementation of chosen policy option - Once a foreign policy option has been chosen, and a formal decision has been made, then the policy must be implemented. Foreign policy is most commonly implemented by specialist foreign policy arms of the state bureaucracy, such as a Ministry of Foreign Affairs or State Department. Other departments may also have a role in implementing foreign policy, such as departments for: trade, defence, and aid.

== Key approaches ==
(as put forward by Graham T. Allison in 1969. For a more comprehensive description see his Book Essence of Decision 1971/1999)

=== Rational actor model ===
The rational actor model is based on rational choice theory. The model adopts the state as the primary unit of analysis, and inter-state relations (or international relations) as the context for analysis. The state is seen as a monolithic unitary actor, capable of making rational decisions based on preference ranking and value maximization.

According to the rational actor model, a rational decision making process is used by a state. This process includes:

- Goal setting and ranking.
- Consideration of options.
- Assessment of consequences.
- Profit maximization.

In other words, it provides models for answering the question: with that information what would be the best decision for reaching one's goal? In this theory, the underlying assumption is that governments are unified and rational, in this manner, they would seek for carefully planned and well-defined foreign policy goals. In this sense, rational choice model is primarily a realist perspective of foreign policy level of analysis. The rational actor model has been subject to criticism. The model tends to neglect a range of political variables, of which Michael Clarke includes: "political decisions, non-political decisions, bureaucratic procedures, continuations of previous policy, and sheer accident." It also ignores emotions, emotional flooding, selective attention, and groupthink. Psychologist Irving Janis researched and popularized the concept, applying it to cases such as the Bay of Pigs Invasion.

=== Governmental Bargaining Model ===
In this model the state is not seen as a monolithic unitary actor. Instead it is a collection of different bureaucracies vying for increasing their funding and size. Individual decision makers try to bargain and compete for influence with their own particular goal in mind. Things are often viewed as a zero-sum game where one bureaucracy's "win" or increasing their level of funding is seen as a loss for another bureaucracy. Here decisions are made by bureaucracies competing against each other and suggesting solutions to problems that would involve using their resources so as to increase their level of importance. Bureaucratic politics model, in keeping with its pluralistic connotation, can also refer to that inner state processes including no institutional actors, who with their informal channels would affect policy results.

=== Organizational Process Model ===
Organizational Processes model emerges from clusters of governmental organizations that look after their own best interests and follow 'standard operating procedures'. In this model different bureaucracies have different standard operating procedures. These procedures are made in order to allow day-to-day operations to be carried out. Often an order or decision will have to work around these standard procedures. It is often exceedingly difficult for a bureaucracy to do something "out of character" or contrary to their standard procedures.

=== Other models ===
- Inter-branch politics model
- Self-aggrandizement model - In this model one leader acts on behalf of his or her interests. (also known as cognitive processes and psychology approach)
- Political process model - In this model the decision making body is affected by many non-governmental actors such as NGOs or the media.
- Multilevel and Multidimensional approach - In this model, scholars study particular aspects of foreign policy making by using various major theories.
- Social constructivist approach - In this model, scholars focus on the role of ideas, discourse, and identity to make FPA.

== Institutions ==
- Council on Foreign Relations
- Chatham House
- American Enterprise Institute
- Brookings Institution
- Woodrow Wilson International Center for Scholars
