= Civic Education Project =

Non-profit organization

Civic Education Project (CEP) was an international non-profit organization founded in 1991 by a group of professionals and scholars from America. It was based at Central European University. It specialized in supporting of promotion of pluralism and international standards in social sciences education in transition countries. Beginning in 1991 with the support from George Soros through his Open Society Institute (OSI), lecturers were sent to teach at eight universities in Czechoslovakia. This Visiting Lecturers program was expanded throughout Eastern Europe over the next several years. In 1996 the mission of the CEP was enhanced by the addition of the Eastern Scholars program, which assisted regional universities by funding local scholars and encouraging them to stay in academia. The CEP was successful, but in 2003, the OSI, the major funding source of the CEP, suggested that the CEP and Higher Education Support Program-HESP, a similar organization created by the OSI, merge. An independent evaluation was completed and recommendations for a possible merger were made, but the Board of Directors did not move ahead with the merger and, in the absence of their major funding source, decided to cease operation of the CEP in the post-communist countries in 2004.
