= Richard Rosecrance =

Richard Newton Rosecrance (24 October 1930 – 7 March 2024) was an American political scientist. His research and teaching was focused on international relations, in particular the link between economics and international relations. His research and writing also touched upon the study of history. Rosecrance was an adherent of liberal international relations theory.

== Education ==
Rosecrance received his BA from Swarthmore College, and his MA and PhD under William Yandell Elliott from Harvard University.

== Career ==
During the 1960s, Rosecrance taught at the University of California, Los Angeles. He was Director of what later became known as the Burkle Center for International Relations at UCLA. During the 1970s, Rosecrance was on the faculty of Cornell University, where he was the Walter S. Carpenter Jr. Professor of International and Comparative Politics.

He served on the Policy Planning Council of the U.S. Department of State and has received Guggenheim, Fulbright, Rockefeller, Ford, and many other fellowships. Rosecrance has held visiting positions at the International Institute for Strategic Studies, King's College London, the London School of Economics, the European University Institute (Florence), and the Australian National University.

Rosecrance was adjunct professor in Public Policy at the John F. Kennedy School of Government at Harvard University. In addition he was Research Professor of Political Science at the University of California and Senior Fellow in the Belfer Center for Science and International Affairs at the John F. Kennedy School of Government.

Rosecrance died on March 7, 2024, at the age of 93.

== Publications ==
Rosecrance has written widely on international topics including:

- Australian diplomacy and Japan, 1945-1951 (1962)
- Action and Reaction in World Politics (1963)
- The dispersion of nuclear weapons : strategy and politics (1964)
- Defense of the Realm: British Strategy in the Nuclear Epoch (1968)
- International Relations: Peace or War? (1973)
- The Rise of the Trading State (1986)
- The Rise of the Virtual State (1999, translated into Malay, Chinese, Japanese, Arabic, and German)
- America's Economic Resurgence (1990)
- The Costs of Conflict (1999, coeditor)
- The Domestic Bases of Grand Strategy (1993)
- The New Great Power Coalition (2001, editor)
- No More States? (2006, editor).
- The Resurgence of the West: How a Transatlantic Union Can Prevent War and Restore the United States and Europe (2013)
- Mergers and International Politics (in progress?)
- The Next Great War? The Roots of World War I and the Risk of U.S.-China Conflict (2014, co-editor)
- International Politics: How History Modifies Theory (2018, co-editor).

== See also ==
- International relations theory
