= Security Studies (journal) =

Peer-reviewed academic journal

- Discipline: Security studies
- Language: English
- Edited by: Ron Hassner

Publication details
- History: 1991–present
- Publisher: Taylor and Francis (United Kingdom)
- Frequency: Quarterly
- Impact factor: 1.778 (2017)

Standard abbreviations
- ISO 4: Secur. Stud.

Indexing
- ISSN: 0963-6412 (print); 1556-1852 (web)
- LCCN: 94644381
- OCLC no.: 676246049

Links
- Journal homepage; Online access; Online archive; Ingentaconnect

Security Studies is a peer-reviewed quarterly academic journal covering international relations published by Routledge. It was established in 1991. The current editor-in-chief is Ron Hassner (University of California, Berkeley). According to the Journal Citation Reports, it has a 2017 impact factor of 1.778.

Along with International Security, it is one of the most prominent journals dedicated to security studies.

== See also ==
- List of scholarly journals in international relations
