= International Studies Quarterly =

Academic journal

- Discipline: International studies
- Language: English
- Edited by: Sam R. Bell; Elena McLean; Jeffrey Pickering

Publication details
- History: 1959–present
- Publisher: Oxford University Press
- Frequency: Quarterly

Standard abbreviations
- ISO 4: Int. Stud. Q.

Indexing
- ISSN: 0020-8833 (print); 1468-2478 (web)
- LCCN: 60052324
- JSTOR: 00208833
- OCLC no.: 732867081

Links
- Journal homepage; Online access

International Studies Quarterly is a quarterly peer-reviewed academic journal of international studies and an official journal of the International Studies Association. It was established in 1959 and is published by Oxford University Press. Oxford Academic reports the journal's impact factor, as of September 2024, is 2.4. As of 2024, the journal has a five-year impact factor of 3.4. The Lead Editors are Sam R. Bell, Elena McLean, and Jeffrey Pickering.

== See also ==
- List of international relations journals
- List of political science journals
