= Journal of Strategic Studies =

Peer-reviewed academic journal

- Discipline: Strategic studies
- Language: English
- Edited by: Joe Maiolo, Thomas G. Mahnken

Publication details
- History: 1978-present
- Publisher: Routledge
- Frequency: 7/year
- Impact factor: 0.895 (2015)

Standard abbreviations
- ISO 4: J. Strateg. Stud.

Indexing
- CODEN: 2009236514
- ISSN: 0140-2390 (print); 1743-937X (web)
- OCLC no.: 950513615

Links
- Journal homepage; Online access; Online archive

The Journal of Strategic Studies is a peer-reviewed academic journal covering military and diplomatic strategic studies. It was established in 1978 by Frank Cass & Co. with John Gooch (University of Leeds) as founding editor-in-chief. The current editors-in-chief are Joe Maiolo (King's College London) and Thomas G. Mahnken (Johns Hopkins University). It is currently published by Routledge.

According to the Journal Citation Reports, the journal has a 2017 impact factor of 1.671.
