= European Journal of International Relations =

- Discipline: International relations
- Language: English
- Edited by: Beate Jahn, Peter Newell, Patricia Owens

Publication details
- History: 1995-present
- Publisher: SAGE Publications on behalf of the Standing Group of International Relations of the European Consortium for Political Research
- Frequency: Quarterly
- Impact factor: 2.545 (2017)

Standard abbreviations
- ISO 4: Eur. J. Int. Relat.

Indexing
- ISSN: 1354-0661 (print); 1460-3713 (web)
- OCLC no.: 474767004

Links
- Journal homepage; Online access; Online archive

The European Journal of International Relations is a quarterly peer-reviewed academic journal covering international relations. It is published by SAGE Publications on behalf of the European Standing Group on International Relations of the European Consortium for Political Research. A joint committee of the SGIR and the European International Studies Association is responsible for the management and success of the journal. It has been described as the leading journal of European international relations.

The journal is abstracted and indexed in Scopus and the Social Sciences Citation Index. According to the Journal Citation Reports, the journal has a 2017 impact factor of 2.545, ranking it 12th out of 85 journals in the category "International Relations".
