= Journal of Global Security Studies =

- Cover of the Journal
- Discipline: Security studies, International relations
- Language: English
- Edited by: James Pattison and Ulrich Petersohn

Publication details
- History: 2016–present
- Publisher: Oxford University Press on behalf of International Studies Association (United Kingdom)
- Frequency: 4/year

Standard abbreviations
- ISO 4: J. Glob. Secur. Stud.

Indexing
- ISSN: 2057-3189 (print); 2057-3170 (web)

Links
- Journal homepage

The Journal of Global Security Studies is a peer-reviewed academic journal which aims to publish first-rate work addressing the variety of methodological, epistemological, theoretical, normative, and empirical concerns reflected in the field of global security studies, encouraging dialogue, engagement, and conversation between different parts of the field.

It is published by Oxford University Press on behalf of the International Studies Association.The current editors in chief are James Pattison and Ulrich Petersohn
