= International Studies Review =

Academic journal

- Discipline: International studies
- Language: English
- Edited by: Sumit Ganguly; Hussein Banai

Publication details
- Former name(s): Mershon International Studies Review
- History: 1957-present
- Publisher: Oxford University Press on behalf of the International Studies Association
- Frequency: Quarterly
- Impact factor: 2.076 (2018)

Standard abbreviations
- ISO 4: Int. Stud. Rev.

Indexing
- ISSN: 1521-9488 (print); 1468-2486 (web)
- LCCN: sn98001195
- JSTOR: 15219488
- OCLC no.: 42897785
- Mershon International Studies Review
- ISSN: 1079-1760

Links
- Journal homepage; Online access; Online archive

The International Studies Review is a quarterly peer-reviewed academic journal published by Oxford University Press on behalf of the International Studies Association. Current editors-in-chief are Sumit Ganguly and Hussein Banai (Indiana University). The journal covers research in international studies. It was established in 1957 as Mershon International Studies Review and obtained its current title in 1999, with volume numbering restarting at 1.

According to the Journal Citation Reports, the journal has a 2018 impact factor of 2.076, ranking it 47th out of 176 journals in the category "Political Science" and 19th out of 91 journals in the category "International Relations".

== See also ==
- List of international relations journals
- List of political science journals
