= International Studies Perspectives =

- Discipline: International relations
- Language: English
- Edited by: James M. Scott, Illinois State University

Publication details
- History: 2000-present
- Publisher: Oxford University Press on behalf of the International Studies Association
- Frequency: Quarterly
- Impact factor: 1.8 (2023)

Standard abbreviations
- ISO 4: Int. Stud. Perspect.

Indexing
- ISSN: 1528-3577 (print); 1528-3585 (web)
- LCCN: 00211505
- OCLC no.: 43371409

Links
- Journal homepage; Online access; Online archive; Journal page at association's website

International Studies Perspectives is a quarterly peer-reviewed academic journal published by Oxford University Press on behalf of the International Studies Association. The journal was established in 2000. The editor-in-chief is James M. Scott (Illinois State University). The journal covers international studies. According to the Journal Citation Reports, the journal has a 2023 impact factor of 1.8.
