= Mershon =

Mershon may refer to:

- Mershon, Georgia
- Hollie Mershon (born 1990), American basketball player
- Kathy Mershon (born Kate Louise Martin) is a fictional character on the soap opera All My Children.
- The Mershon Center is an academic think tank at the Ohio State University in the United States.
- Ralph D. Mershon was an engineer, inventor, and benefactor of Ohio State University.
