= Kruzel =

Kruzel is a surname. Notable people with the surname include:

- Joe Kruzel (born 1965), American baseball coach and former player
- Joseph J. Kruzel (1918–2002), American major general
- Ondrej Kružel (born 1988), Slovak weightlifter

== See also ==
- Kužel
