= Edgar S. Furniss Jr. =

American political scientist

- Born: Edgar Stephenson Furniss Jr. August 14, 1918; Newton, Iowa, United States
- Died: August 17, 1966 (aged 48); Columbus, Ohio, United States
- Occupations: Political scientist and educator
- Spouse: Georgia Lee Bulletin (m. 1941-1966)
- Children: 2
- Parent(s): Edgar S. Furniss; Beryl Cates

Academic background
- Education: Yale University
- Thesis: A New State Faces a Difficult World: The Position of Turkey Today (1940)
- Academic advisor: Arnold Wolfers

Academic work
- Discipline: Political science
- Institutions: Princeton University; Ohio State University

Edgar "Ed" Stephenson Furniss Jr. (August 14, 1918 — August 17, 1966) was an American political scientist and educator. Furniss was the Mershon Professor of Political Science at Ohio State University.

== Career ==
Son of the noted economist Edgar S. Furniss and Beryl Francis Gates, Furniss was born in Newton. He received all of his degrees from Yale University: a Bachelor of Science in 1940, a Master of Arts in 1945, and a Doctor of Philosophy in 1947. In college, Furniss wrote a thesis on the Politics of Turkey, under the direction of Arnold Wolfers. Furniss was a member of Phi Beta Kappa.

Upon graduating, Furniss began his teaching career at Princeton University, where he rose to the rank of full Professor by 1960. Three years later, he became the Mershon Professor of Political Science and the first Director of the Mershon Center for International Security Studies at Ohio State University.

Furniss also served two terms as Vice President of the International Studies Association, as well as serving as President of the Midwest Chapter.

On August 17, 1966, Furniss died at Riverside Methodist Hospital after complications from surgery, three days after his birthday and only months after his father received the inaugural Wilbur Cross Medal.

In 1982, a book award at Ohio State was named in his honor by Charles F. Hermann. Harry G. Summers Jr. was the first recipient.

== See also ==
- List of Ohio State University people
- List of Princeton University people
- List of Yale University people
