= Gelpi =

Gelpi is a surname. Notable people with the surname include:

- Albert Gelpi, professor of literature
- Christopher Gelpi (born 1966), American historian
- Germán Gelpi (1909–1982), Argentine artist and designer
- Gustavo Gelpí (born 1965), United States Judge in Puerto Rico
- Leandro Gelpi (born 1991), Uruguayan footballer
- Ricardo Gelpi (born 1950), Argentine physician and professor
- Rosita Rota Gelpi (born 1973), Italian retired mountain runner
