= Charles F. Hermann =

American political scientist

Charles Frazer Hermann (born June 29, 1938) holds the Brent Scowcroft Chair in International Policy Studies at the George Bush School of Government and Public Service at Texas A&M University. He is an expert in matters relating to American foreign policy, crisis management, and decision-making.

Hermann is an author or editor of nine books and numerous journal articles on issues relating to foreign policy, simulation, national security, and group decision-making.

== Education and career ==
Charles Hermann received a BA in political science from DePauw University in 1960. He completed an MA in political science in 1963, and a PhD in political science in 1965, both from Northwestern University.

From 1969 to 1970, Hermann served on the United States National Security Council (NSC) staff under National Security Advisor Henry Kissinger, an appointment made through the International Affairs Fellowship of the Council on Foreign Relations. Before joining the NSC, he taught at the Woodrow Wilson School of Public and International Affairs at Princeton University.

Hermann served as a professor of political science at Ohio State University – from 1970 to 1995. There he also served as the director of the Mershon Center, an academic research center dedicated to national security and foreign policy issues from 1980 to 1995 as well as the acting vice provost for international affairs at Ohio State University. During 1991–1992, Hermann also served as a Fellow in the Pew Case Program of the Kennedy School at Harvard University.

Hermann is a member of Council on Foreign Relations, American Political Science Association, International Studies Association, International Society for Political Psychology, and the Arms Control Association.

=== Mershon Center ===
Charles Hermann served as Director of the Mershon Center for International Security Studies at The Ohio State University from 1980 to 1995 (interrupted for two years to serve as Acting Vice Provost for International Affairs at Ohio State). The Mershon Center funded faculty and PhD research and educational projects dealing with national and international security. It encouraged faculty to seek relevant external grants and contracts with a vigorous matching program from the endowment established by Ralph D. Mershon. Additionally as Director of the Mershon Center, Charles Hermann initiated several projects designed to advance both scholarly and public knowledge about international affairs and foreign policy. In 1984 he created the Edgar S. Furniss Award, named for the first director of the Mershon Center, Edgar S. Furniss. Given annually, the award is presented to an author whose first book makes an exceptional contribution to the study of national and international security.

In 1985 he provided resources and encouragement to his Mershon colleague, Joseph J. Kruzel Jr., to create and edit an annual review of critical issues in American defense policy. The first edition, of the American Defense Annual appeared in 1986. It continued each year until Kruzel took a leave from the Mershon Center to serve as Deputy Assistant Secretary of Defense for NATO and Europe. Hemann assumed editorship of the 9th edition. Tragically, Professor Kruzel was killed in Bosnia while working to establish peace negotiations and Hermann left the Mershon Center in 1995. The book series was not continued.

The Mershon International Studies Review, begun in 1957, was a concern of Hermann. In 1994 he negotiated with the International Studies Association to jointly sponsor a new journal of analytical essays and reviews to carry forward the work of the Mershon journal. After Hermann left the Mershon Center, the International Studies Association continued the journal as The International Studies Review.

=== Texas A&M University ===
Hermann joined Texas A&M University in 1995 as the founding Director of the Bush School, which was established as part of President George H. W. Bush's Presidential Library complex at Texas A&M University.

== Publications ==
=== Books ===
- Crisis in Foreign Policy: A Simulation Analysis, was published by Bobbs-Merrill in 1969. 234 pp. (ASIN: B0006BYNTC)
- Courses in Foreign Policy: An Anthology of Syllabi, co-edited with Kenneth Waltz was published by SAGE Publications in 1969. 117 pp. (ASIN B007EMSD1K)
- International Crises: Insights from Behavioral Research, ed. 1972, was published by Free Press. 334 pp. (ISBN 978-0029145609)
- CREON: A Foreign Event Data Set as part of the Sage Professional Papers in International Studies, edited by Maurice East, Margaret Hermann, Barbara Salmore, and Stephen Salmore, was published by SAGE Publications in 1973. 104 pp. (ISBN 978-0803903623)
- Why Nations Act: Theoretical Perspectives for Comparative Foreign Policy Studies as part of the SAGE Focus Editions, was co-edited with Maurice East and Stephen Salmore, published by SAGE Publications in 1978. 225 pp. (ISBN 978-0803907188)
- New Directions in the Study of Foreign Policy, edited by Charles Kegley and James Rosenau, was published by Routledge in 1987. 538 pp. (ISBN 978-0043270943)
- American Defense Annual, 1994, ed. 1994, was published by Lexington Books. 351 pp. (ISBN 978-0029176764)
- Violent Conflict in the 21st Century: Causes, Instruments & Mitigation, was co-edited with Harold Jacobson and Anne S. Moffat, published by American Academy of Arts & Sciences in 1999. 134 pp. (ISBN 978-0877240136)
- When Things Go Wrong: Foreign Policy Decision Making Under Adverse Feedback as part of the Foreign Policy Analysis Series, ed. 2012, was published by Routledge. 194 pp. (ISBN 978-0415895293)

=== Other publications ===
Hermann's numerous publications appear in various political and international affairs journals including American Political Science Review, World Politics, International Studies Quarterly, Journal of Conflict Resolution, Policy Studies Journal, and International Encyclopedia of the Social Sciences, amongst others. Hermann has also authored various technical research reports and policy documents for National Science Foundation; U.S. Naval Ordnance Test Station, China Lake, California; Advanced Research Projects Agency, Human Resources Research Office of the Office of Naval Research amongst others. A complete list of his publications is available online.

== Personal life ==
Hermann is married to Lorraine Eden and they have three children. He lives in College Station, Texas with his wife and has been actively involved in local community volunteer activities for many years.
