= Charles Herman =

Charles Herman or Hermann may refer to:

- Charles Herman, inventor of the Wonder Wheel, a type of Ferris wheel
- Charles Herman, a character in the film A Beautiful Mind
- Charles F. Hermann (born 1938), American political scientist
- Tiny Hermann (Charles Bismark Hermann, 1906–1966), Canadian football player and track and field athlete.
- Charles Herrmann (born 2006), German football player.

== See also ==
- Charles Herman-Wurmfeld (born 1966), American film director
- Chuck Harmon (Charles Byron Harmon, 1924–2019), American retired Major League Baseball player
