= David Houghton =

David Houghton may refer to:

- David Houghton (cricketer) (born 1957), Zimbabwean Test cricketer
- David Houghton (designer), English graphic artist, designer and photographer
- David Houghton (footballer), New Zealand international football (soccer) player
- David P. Houghton (born 1966), British political scientist
- Dave Houghton, British drummer for the Joe Jackson Band
