= 832nd Air Division =

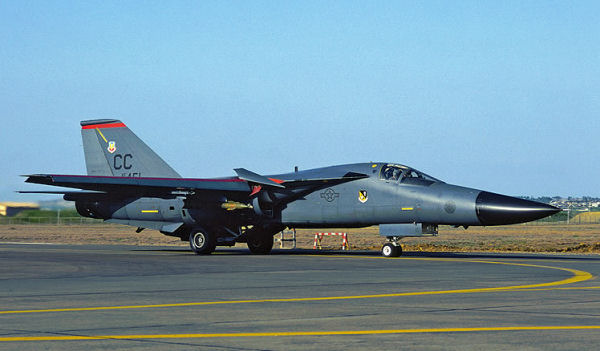
- F111 Aardvark of the 27th Tactical Fighter Wing (Note: Aircraft is F-111F serial 72-1451, taken in the late 1970s. This air raft was transferred to the Aerospace Maintenance and Regeneration Center (AMARC) on 15 January 2008 and scrapped on 9 May 2011. Baugher, Joe (5 August 2023). "1972 USAF Serial Numbers". Joe Baugher..)
- Active: 1957–1975; 1980–1991
- Country: United States
- Branch: United States Air Force
- Role: Command of tactical fighter forces
- Decorations: Air Force Outstanding Unit Award

Commanders
- Notable commanders: Gen William W. Momyer; Gen Michael Dugan; Brig Gen Robinson Risner; Maj Gen Joseph J. Kruzel; Col Robert R. Scott

Insignia
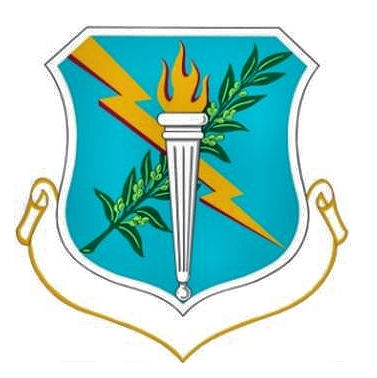
- 832nd Air Division emblem (Note: Approved 18 August 1958. Description: Azure, an olive branch leafed and fructed and a lightning flash point to base saltirewise throughout proper, overall a torch argent flammant of the second [color mentioned], all within a diminished border of the third [color mentioned].)

The 832nd Air Division is an inactive United States Air Force organization. Its last assignment was with Tactical Air Command, (TAC) assigned to Twelfth Air Force at Luke Air Force Base, Arizona, where it was inactivated on 1 October 1991.

The division was first activated at Cannon Air Force Base, New Mexico in October 1957 to command the two North American F-100 Super Sabre wings stationed there and to provide support for them through its 832nd Air Base Group. It deployed all its operational squadrons to Florida during the Cuban Missile Crisis, along with the headquarters of one of its subordinate wings.

In 1964, the 366th Tactical Fighter Wing was activated at Holloman Air Force Base, New Mexico and assigned to the division. Although initially equipped with Republic F-84F Thunderstreaks reclaimed from the Air National Guard, the 366th re-equipped with the McDonnell F-4 Phantom II, with which it moved to Vietnam in 1966. During the Pueblo Crisis, the division was assigned a wing of the Colorado Air National Guard, whose squadrons also served in Vietnam. Between 1968 and 1970, the 49th Tactical Fighter Wing was assigned to the 832nd. The 49th Wing moved to the United States from Germany, but was "dual based", committed to deploy to Germany to support the North Atlantic Treaty Organization as needed.

The 832nd once again deployed forces to Southeast Asia in 1972, when the General Dynamics F-111 Aardvarks of its 474th Tactical Fighter Wing deployed to Thailand. The division was inactivated in 1975 and its subordinate units assigned directly to Twelfth Air Force.

In 1980, the division was again activated to replace Tactical Training, Luke, whose mission and personnel it absorbed. It continued to train fighter crews from the United States Air Force and allied countries until it was inactivated in 1991 when TAC implemented the Objective Wing organization, which called for all organizations on an installation to be assigned to a single wing. Although the division did not directly participate in Operations Desert Shield and Desert Storm, it deployed support forces and combat elements to the combat theater.

== History ==
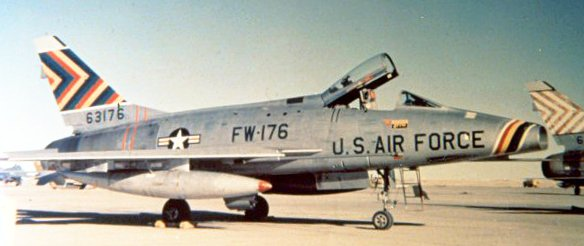
474th Wing commander's F-100

=== Fighter operations at Cannon Air Force Base ===
The 832nd Air Division was activated at Cannon Air Force Base, New Mexico and assigned to Eighteenth Air Force in October 1957, when the 474th Fighter-Bomber Wing was activated as Tactical Air Command (TAC)'s second fighter-bomber wing there. The 474th joined the 312th Fighter-Bomber Wing, which had been at Cannon since 1954. (Note: The 474th wing's 474th Fighter-Bomber Group had also been at Cannon since 1954.) The two wings, which flew the North American F-100 Super Sabre, became the air division's initial tactical components, while the 832nd Air Base Group was assigned to the division to manage support activities at George. The 312th Wing headquarters provided the cadre for the division and its former commander, Colonel William W. Momyer, became the division's first commander. Three months after its activation, the division was reassigned to Twelfth Air Force, which moved without personnel or equipment from Germany to replace Eighteenth Air Force.

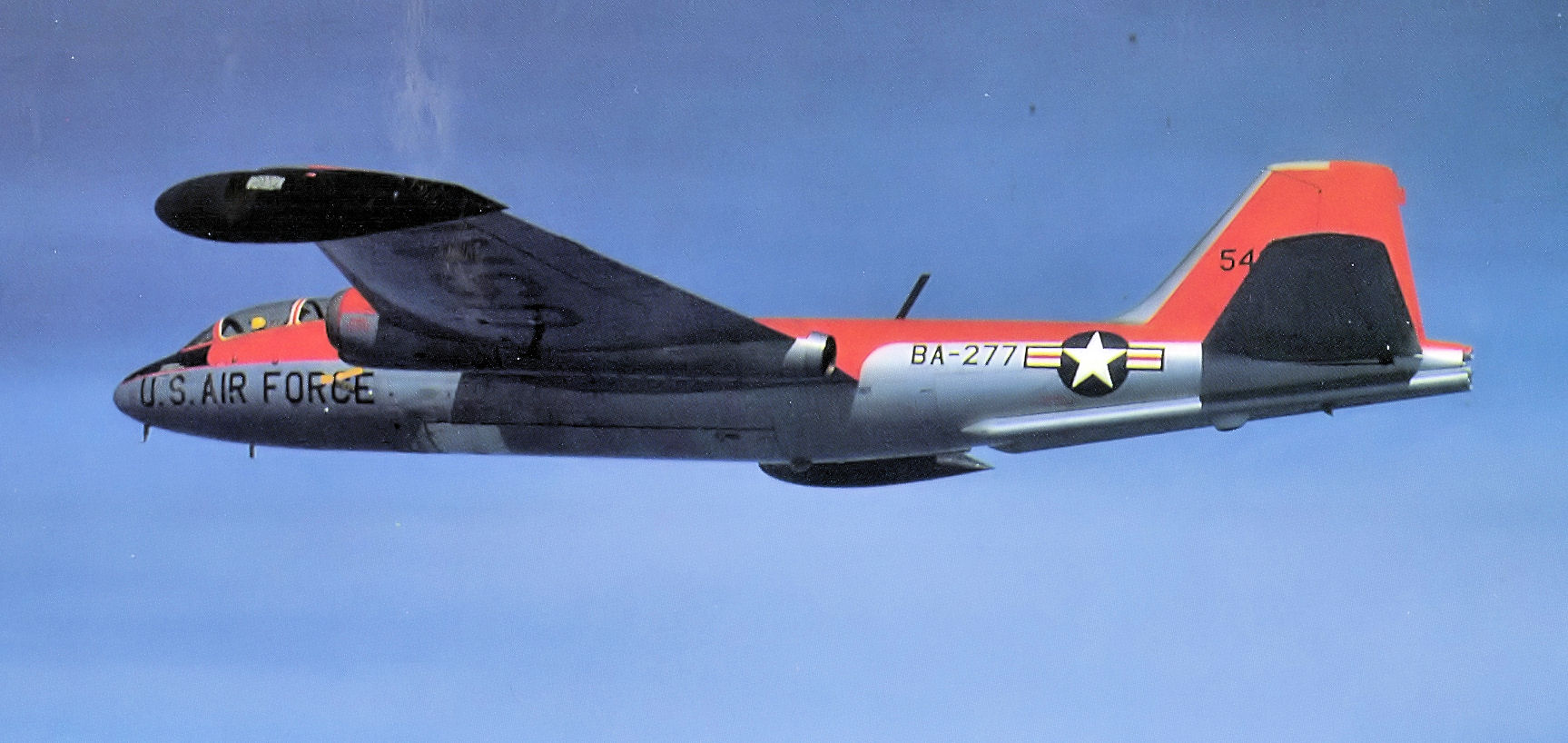
B-57E target towing aircraft

From late in 1958 through the end of 1959, the 1st Tow Target Squadron, stationed at Biggs Air Force Base, Texas, and primarily equipped with the Martin B-57 Canberra, but also flying a few Douglas B-26 Invaders was attached to the division. The primary mission of this squadron was to provide targets for the Army Anti-Aircraft Artillery School at Fort Bliss. In December 1959, the 312th Wing and its components were inactivated and its mission, personnel and aircraft transferred to the 27th Tactical Fighter Wing, which moved to Cannon from Bergstrom Air Force Base, Texas without personnel or equipment, when Bergstrom became a base for dispersed Boeing B-52 Stratofortress bombers of Strategic Air Command.

The 27th Wing deployed to MacDill Air Force Base, Florida during the Cuban Missile Crisis from October to December 1962. The operational squadrons of the 474th Wing also deployed to Florida during the crisis, although 474th Wing headquarters remained at Cannon with the division.

=== Command of wings at multiple bases ===
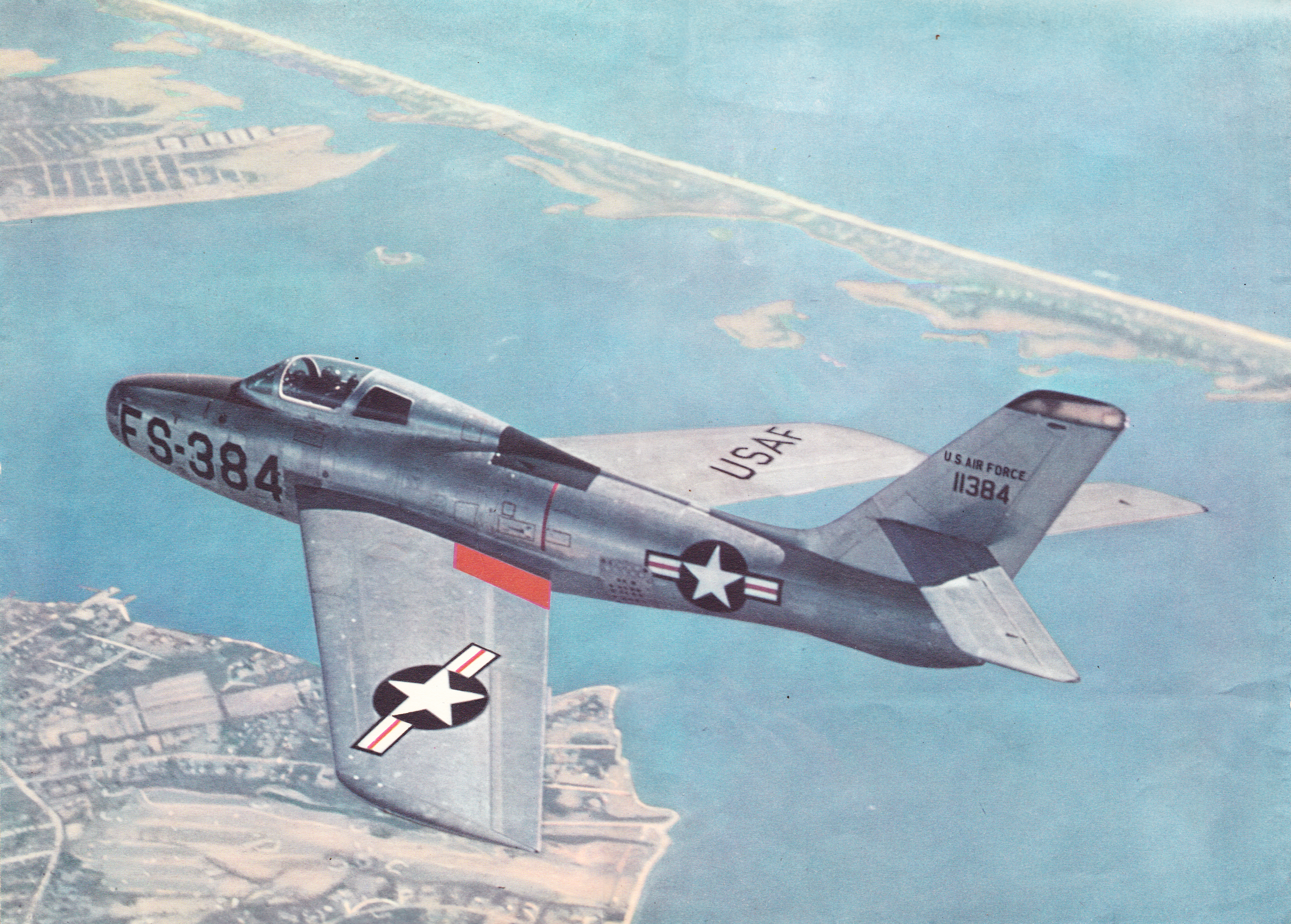
F-84F Thunderstreak

The 366th Tactical Fighter Wing, flying Republic F-84F Thunderstreaks at Holloman Air Force Base, New Mexico was assigned to the division in October 1964. This marked the first time that a wing at a base other than Cannon was assigned to the 832nd. Within a few months of its assignment, the 366th began converting to the McDonnell F-4 Phantom II. After its conversion was complete and it was combat ready the 366th Wing moved to Phan Rang Air Base, Viet Nam in March 1966 and was reassigned.

In September 1965, the 474th Wing was stripped of its personnel and equipment and became a "paper organization" for the next year. In anticipation of converting the wing to fly the General Dynamics F-111 Aardvark, it began to receive a few personnel in the fall of 1966, but these people were withdrawn in June 1967 and the 474th remained unmanned until January 1968, when it moved to Nellis Air Force Base, Nevada and was reassigned.

As a result of the Pueblo Crisis the 140th Tactical Fighter Wing, an F-100 wing of the Colorado Air National Guard, was called to federal service on 25 January 1968 and assigned to the division the following day. Two of its fighter squadrons were transferred to wings in Vietnam after becoming combat ready and the wing became non-operational, transferring on paper to Cannon until it was released from active duty on 30 April 1969. (Note: The 120th Tactical Fighter Squadron was assigned to the 35th Tactical Fighter Wing at Phan Rang Air Base and the 174th Tactical Fighter Squadron, an Iowa Air National Guard unit was assigned to the 37th Tactical Fighter Wing at Phu Cat Air Base. Ravenstein, pp. 61, 65.)

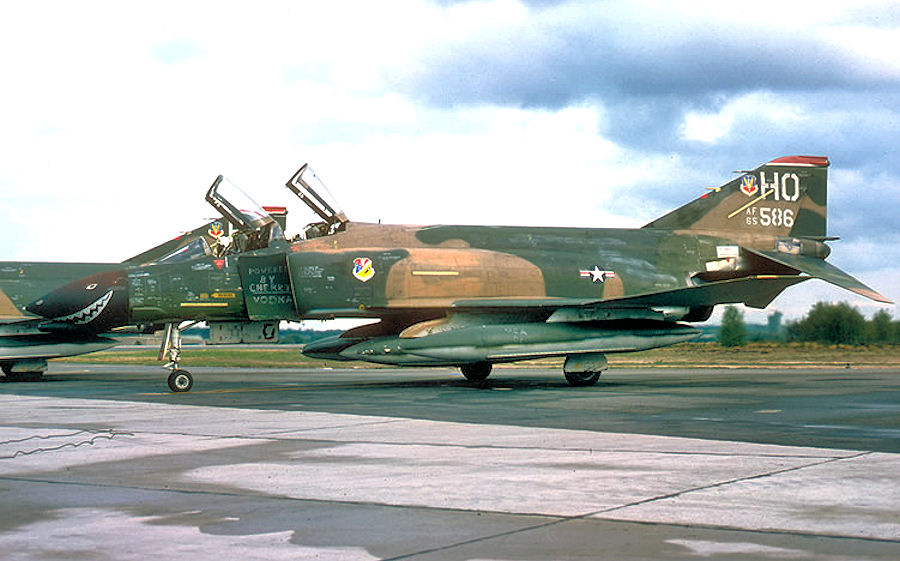
49th Tactical Fighter Wing F-4D (Note: Aircraft is McDonnell F-4D-26-MC Phantom II, serial 65-0586. Transferred to AMARC on 12 July 1990. It was sent to the Saylor Creek Range, Idaho as a range target on October 1998. Baugher, Joe (9 February 2023). "1965 USAF Serial Numbers". Joe Baugher.)

In July 1968, the 49th Tactical Fighter Wing, equipped with McDonnell F-4 Phantom IIs, moved to Holloman Air Force Base, New Mexico from Spangdahlem Air Base, Germany. The 49th was the United States Air Force's first "dual-based" wing, committed to the North Atlantic Treaty Organization (NATO) and subject to immediate return to Europe when needed. Spangdahlem remained the wing's European base, with elements left behind organized into the 7149th Tactical Fighter Wing. The 49th's capability to rapidly deploy and operate in Europe was tested annually in a series of Crested Cap/Reforger exercises The 49th Wing's NATO commitment lasted until it was reassigned in 1970. The first test of the wing's deployment capability took place from January through April 1969.

The 347th Tactical Fighter Wing at Mountain Home Air Force Base was assigned to the 832nd in May 1971, giving it command of all of TAC's F-111 wings. The following year saw the retirement of the division's original aircraft, the F-100, when the last combat ready squadron in the active duty Air Force was inactivated. In September 1972, the 474th Wing deployed its F-111s to Takhli Royal Thai Air Force Base, Thailand, leaving only a small housekeeping detachment behind at Nellis. It flew combat missions until the following March, when part of the wing returned to Nellis, leaving most of its F-111s behind in Thailand. By August it had transferred its remaining Aardvarks to Mountain Home Air Force Base, Idaho and converted to The F-4 Phantom II. The 366th Tactical Fighter Wing returned to the division's control in October 1972, when it returned from Southeast Asia in name only to Mountain Home, where it took over the F-111s of the 347th Wing.

The division was inactivated in 1975 and its subordinate wings were assigned directly to Twelfth Air Force.

=== Reactivation ===
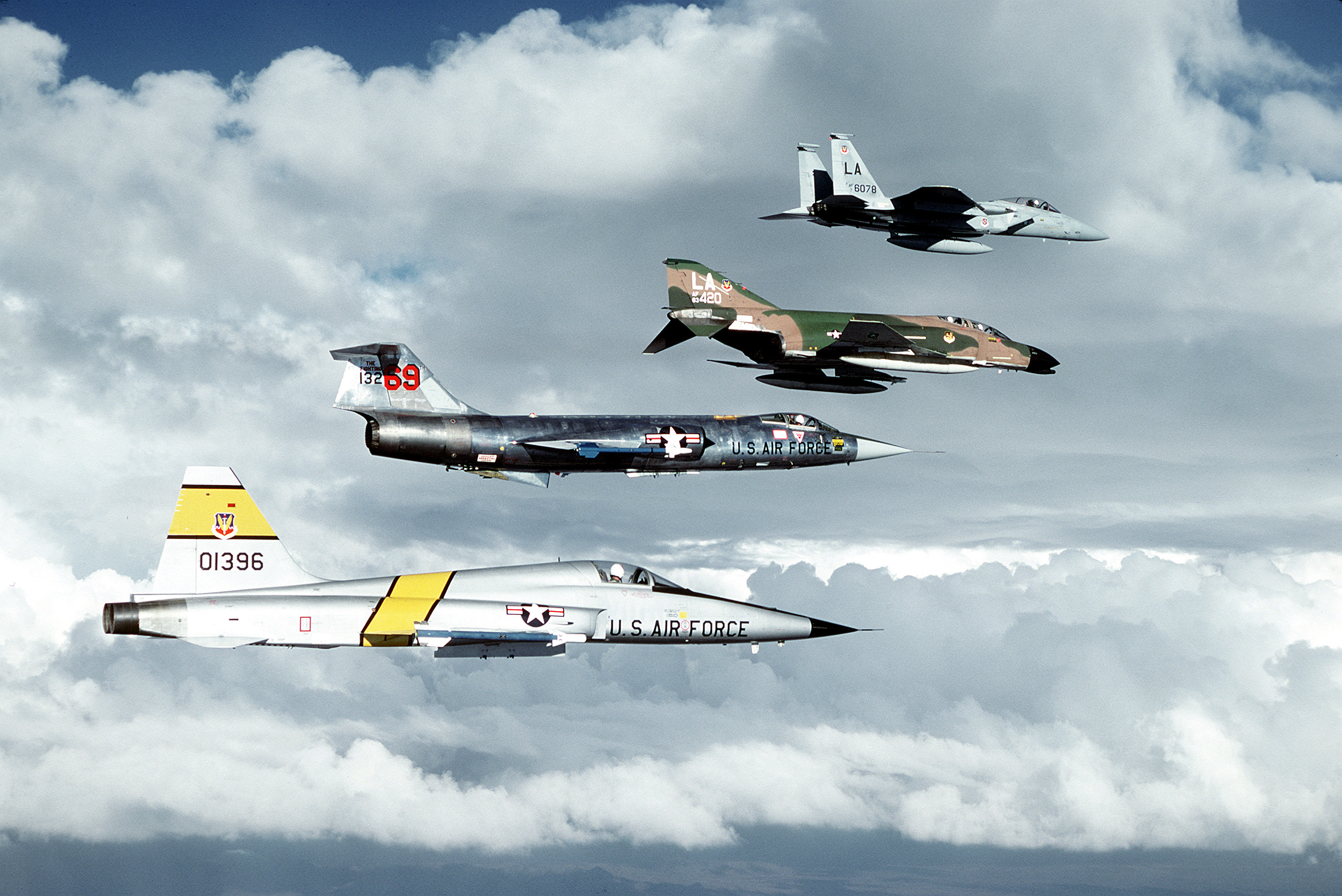
58th Tactical Training Wing aircraft (Note: Aircraft are Northrop F-5E Tiger II serial 72-1396, Lockheed (Fokker) F-104G Starfighter serial 63-13269, McDonnell F-4C-15-MC Phantom II serial 63-7420, and McDonnell Douglas F-15A-16-MC Eagle serial 76–0078.)

The division was reactivated in December 1980 at Luke Air Force Base, Arizona by absorbing the resources of Tactical Training, Luke. The 58th and 405th Tactical Training Wings were reassigned from the former headquarters at Luke as its operational components and the 58th Combat Support Group was assigned from the 58th Wing to manage support operations for Luke. (Note: Within a year, the 58th was replaced by the 832nd Combat Support Group as the headquarters for Luke's support units.) The 58th Wing conducted training with the F-4C Phantom II and the Lockheed F-104G Starfighter. The 405th Wing flew the Northrop F-5 Freedom Fighter and the McDonnell Douglas F-15 Eagle.

Upon activation at Luke, the division mission was to supervise combat crew training programs at Luke Air Force Base, which included training pilots from West Germany, Mexico, Japan, and Saudi Arabia. Training of foreign students on fighter aircraft frequently required elements of the division to deploy to their countries to assist their governments in the conduct of training. In addition to its training mission, the 832nd was tasked to provide forces to augment the air defense of the United States in the event of an emergency. The division also participated in numerous tactical exercises

During Operations Desert Shield and Desert Storm, the division deployed combat and support elements to Southwest Asia, although it did not directly engage in operations. The deployed personnel were replaced at Luke by reservists and Air National Guard personnel who had been called to active duty. The division was inactivated in 1991 when the Air Force implemented the Objective Wing organization, which placed all elements on a base under a single wing and eliminated the division level of organization.

== Lineage ==
- Established as the 832nd Air Division on 26 September 1957

Inactivated on 1 July 1975
Activated on 1 December 1980
Inactivated on 1 October 1991

=== Assignments ===
- Eighteenth Air Force, 8 October 1957
- Twelfth Air Force, 1 January 1958 – 1 July 1975
- Twelfth Air Force, 1 December 1980 – 1 October 1991

=== Stations ===
- Cannon Air Force Base, New Mexico, 8 October 1957 – 1 July 1975
- Luke Air Force Base, Arizona, 1 December 1980 – 1 October 1991

=== Components ===
Wings

- 27th Tactical Fighter Wing: 18 February 1959 – 1 July 1975 (attached to 1st Air Division [Provisional] 21 October – 1 December 1962)
- 49th Tactical Fighter Wing: 1 July 1968 – 1 February 1970 (attached to Seventeenth Air Force 15 January – 4 April 1969)

Holloman Air Force Base, New Mexico

- 58th Tactical Training Wing: 1 December 1980 – 1 October 1991
- 140th Tactical Fighter Wing: 26 January 1968 – 30 April 1969

Buckley Air National Guard Base until c. 1 May 1968

- 312th Fighter-Bomber Wing(later 312 Tactical Fighter Wing): 8 October 1957 – 18 February 1959
- 347th Tactical Fighter Wing: 15 May 1971 – 31 October 1972
- 366th Tactical Fighter Wing: 1 October 1964 – 20 March 1966; 31 October 1972 – 1 July 1975

Holloman Air Force Base, New Mexico 1964–1966
Mountain Home Air Force Base, 1972–1975

- 405th Tactical Training Wing: 1 December 1980 – 1 October 1991
- 474th Fighter-Bomber Wing (later 474 Tactical Fighter Wing): 8 October 1957 – 20 January 1968; 20 March 1968 – 1 July 1975 (attached to Advanced Echelon (ADVON), Seventh Air Force, 27 September 1972 – c. 23 March 1973)

Nellis Air Force Base after 20 March 1968

Groups

- 58th Combat Support Group: 1 December 1980 – 1 October 1981
- 832nd Air Base Group (later 832nd Combat Support Group): 18 February 1959 – 1 July 1967, 1 October 1981 – 1 October 1991

Squadrons

- 1st Tow Target Squadron: attached 9 October 1958 – 1 January 1960

Biggs Air Force Base, Texas

- 561st Tactical Fighter Squadron: 1 July 1972 – 15 Jul 1973
- 562nd Tactical Fighter Squadron: 1–31 July 1972
- 563rd Tactical Fighter Squadron: 1–31 Jul 1972
- 2037th Communications Squadron: 1 September 1990 – 1 October 1991
- 4444th Operations Squadron (Operational Training Development): 1 April 1989 – 1 October 1991

Other

- 832nd Tactical Hospital: 1 August 1959 – 1 July 1967, 16 September 1983 – 1 October 1991
- 4451 USAF Hospital: 8 October 1957 – 25 January 1959
- USAF Hospital, Luke (later 832nd Medical Group): 1 December 1980 – 1 October 1991

=== Aircraft ===
- North American F-100 Super Sabre, 1957–1972
- Douglas B-26 Invader, 1958–1959
- Martin B-57 Canberra, 1958–1959
- Republic F-84F Thunderstreak, 1964–1965
- McDonnell F-4 Phantom II, 1965–1966, 1968–1970, 1980–1982
- General Dynamics F-111 Aardvark, 1968–1975
- Republic F-105 Thunderchief, 1972–1973
- Northrop F-5 Freedom Fighter, 1980–1989
- Lockheed F-104 Starfighter, 1980–1983
- Lockheed TF-104 Starfighter, 1980–1983
- McDonnell Douglas F-15 Eagle, c. 1982–1991
- General Dynamics F-16 Fighting Falcon, 1982–1991

=== Commanders ===
- Brig Gen William W. Momyer, 8 October 1957
- Brig Gen J. Stanley Holtoner, 8 July 1958 (Note: General Holtoner was the winner of the 1953 Thompson Trophy in an F-86D Sabre Meixner, Bill (18 February 2013). "The Thompson Trophy Story". Society of Air Racing Historians..)
- Col Gilbert L. Meyers, 31 May 1959
- Brig Gen Virgil L. Zoller, c. 4 August 1959
- Col Harry J. Hawthorne, November 1961
- Col Albert W. Schinz, March 1962
- Brig Gen Joseph J. Kruzel, 15 January 1964
- Col Walter G. Benz Jr., by June 1965
- Col Dale S. Sweat, by December 1965
- Col Robert A. Taylor, by June 1967
- Col Robert R. Scott, c. 1 September 1967
- Col Donald N. Stanfield, 1 September 1970
- Brig Gen Robert V. Spencer, 31 March 1972
- Col Ralph E. Craycroft, 31 January 1974
- Brig Gen Robinson Risner, c. 28 February 1974 – 1 July 1975
- Brig Gen William A. Gorton, 1 December 1980
- Brig Gen Michael J. Dugan, 31 March 1981
- Maj Gen Henry D. Canterbury, 12 May 1982
- Col David L. Sherlock, 13 December 1984
- Brig Gen John M. Davey, 16 January 1985
- Brig Gen Billy G. McCoy, 25 July 1986
- Brig Gen Daniel P. Sherlock, 29 June 1987
- Brig Gen Ralph T. Browning, 4 September 1990 – 30 September 1991

=== Awards and campaigns ===
| Award streamer | Award | Dates | Notes |
|---|---|---|---|
| | Air Force Outstanding Unit Award | 1 August 1982 – 31 May 1984 | |
| | Air Force Outstanding Unit Award | 1 June 1986 – 31 May 1988 | |
| | Air Force Outstanding Unit Award | 1 June 1988 – 31 May 1990 | |
| | Air Force Outstanding Unit Award | 1 June 1990 – 30 September 1991 | |

== See also ==
- General Dynamics F-16 Fighting Falcon operators
- List of B-57 units of the United States Air Force
- List of F-100 units of the United States Air Force
- List of F-105 units of the United States Air Force
- List of Lockheed F-104 Starfighter operators
- List of McDonnell Douglas F-15 Eagle operators
- List of United States Air Force air divisions
- McDonnell Douglas F-4 Phantom II non-U.S. operators
