= Joseph J. Kruzel Jr. =

Joseph J. Kruzel Jr. (1945–1995) was a special assistant to United States Secretary of Defense who died in Bosnia while negotiating a cease fire. He was the son of Joseph J. Kruzel.

Kruzel graduated from the U.S. Air Force Academy in 1967 and served as an intelligence officer and as a briefing officer for the Joint Chiefs of Staff during the Vietnam War. He later joined the U.S. Department of State and served as a member of the U.S. delegation to the Strategic Arms Limitation Talks in Helsinki. He was appointed special assistant to U.S. Secretary of Defense Harold Brown and later legislative assistant for defense and foreign policy for Senator Edward Kennedy. Kruzel left government service to teach at Duke and Ohio State Universities. In 1993, Kruzel served as deputy assistant secretary of defense for European and NATO policy. He was one of the creators of Partnership for Peace program, which aimed at creating trust between the member states of NATO and other states in Europe, including post-Soviet states. On 1993, he was appointed as Department of Defense's special envoy to Bosnia and chief negotiator on the United States team working to end the Yugoslav Wars. On August 19, 1995, while en route to Sarajevo for scheduled meeting with President of Bosnia Alija Izetbegovic, Kruzel and two other American diplomats, Robert C. Frasure and Samuel Nelson Drew, were killed when their armored personnel carrier crashed down a 500-meter slope into a ravine when a rain-soaked dirt road at Mount Igman they were travelling on collapsed. He was posthumously awarded the Presidential Citizens Medal on December 15, 1995, by U.S. President Bill Clinton.

"Kruzel, a native of Goldsboro, N.C., graduated from the Air Force Academy in 1967. He had a doctorate from Harvard. He taught at Harvard, Duke and Ohio State and was a frequent contributor to defense journals. He served as an intelligence officer in the Vietnam War. During the Jimmy Carter Administration, he was a special assistant to Secretary of Defense Harold Brown. Kruzel and his wife, Gail, had two children."

At a Presidential Citizens Medal presentation, President Bill Clinton said, "Joe Kruzel was also a man with an apparently endless sense of humor. Over a three-decade career of service to our Nation, he retained also his idealism about our goals, while leavening it with a healthy dose of realism about the foibles of any large bureaucratic effort. One of his colleagues remarked that while others were focused on day-to-day events, Joe's eyes were always on the horizon. He saw that an undivided democratic Europe was within reach, and he led the Pentagon's efforts in reaching out to the East to make that dream a reality. All of us, including myself and Bill Perry, valued his sage and firm advice. He did not mince words, and we all listened."

In 1985 Charles F. Hermann, director of the Mershon Center, encouraged Kruzel to begin publishing American Defense Annual.

== Works ==
- 1990-91: American Defense Annual @ Internet Archive
