= History of Ohio State University =

The Ohio State University was founded in 1870 as a land-grant university in accordance with the Morrill Act of 1862 under the name of Ohio Agricultural and Mechanical College. The school was originally situated within a farming community located on the northern edge of Columbus, and was intended to matriculate students of various agricultural and mechanical disciplines. The university opened to 24 students on September 17, 1873. In 1878, the first class of six men graduated. The first woman graduated the following year. In 1900, in light of its expanded focus, the college permanently changed its name to the now-familiar "The Ohio State University". Ohio State began accepting graduate students in the 1880s, with the university awarding its first master's and doctoral degrees in 1886 and 1890 respectively. 1891 saw the founding of Ohio State's law school.

== General history ==
=== Formative years (1870–1891) ===
The Ohio State University was founded in 1870 as a land-grant university in accordance with the Morrill Act of 1862 under the name of Ohio Agricultural and Mechanical College. Initially, it was thought that one of Ohio's two existing public universities (Ohio University and Miami University) would be designated as the land-grant institution, and each engaged in a vigorous competition to win over the state legislature. At the strong urging of Republican stalwart Governor Rutherford B. Hayes, however, it was ultimately decided to establish a new university to be located near the legislature in Columbus. Hayes' role in founding the university is recognized in Hayes Hall (named after Rutherford, not Woody), the oldest building still standing on the campus. Hayes later noted that the founding of The Ohio State University was one of his two greatest achievements—the other being Ohio's ratification of the Fifteenth Amendment.

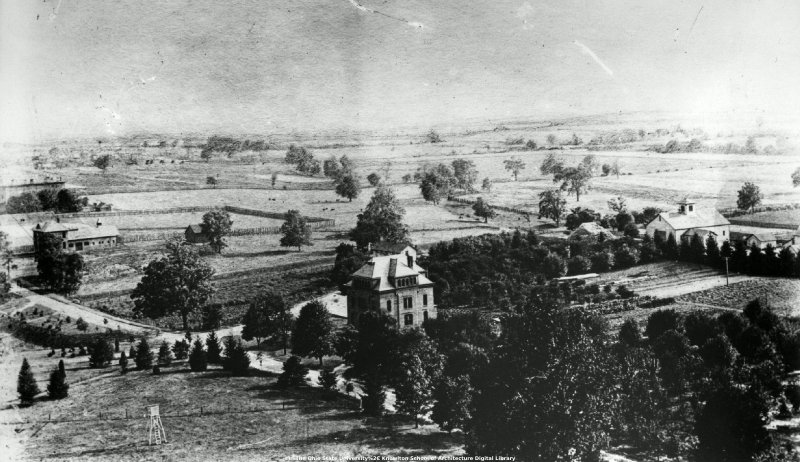
The Veterinary Hospital and Experiment Station in 1890, surrounded by farmland.

The school was originally situated within a farming community located on the northern edge of Columbus, and was intended to matriculate students of various agricultural and mechanical disciplines. From its inception, a debate was waged between those in favor of broadening the university's focus to encompass the liberal arts and sciences and those who favored a more limited focus. Governor Hayes viewed the selection of the university's location as key to keeping the university free of excess influence by the state's agricultural interests. As such, he worked strongly behind the scenes to ensure that the campus would be located in the city of Columbus rather than the more agriculturally oriented towns of Springfield or Urbana. The campus' location near the state capital combined with Hayes' plan of an expanded board of trustees based upon one member from each of the state's congressional districts ensured that his vision for the new university's curriculum would be put into place. Subsequently, the new board of trustees voted on the spectrum of disciplines to be offered. The ("broad-gauge") faction was led by university trustee Joseph Sullivant. When the votes were completed, it had been decided to offer seven fields of study: agriculture, ancient languages, chemistry, geology, mathematics, modern languages, and physics. Only the ancient languages curriculum came down to a close vote, passing by a margin of 8–7. Later that year, the university welcomed its first class of twenty-four students, including three women. In 1878, and in light of its expanded focus, the college permanently changed its name to the now-familiar "The Ohio State University." To this day, "The" is part of Ohio State's official name.

Two factors in Ohio State's formative years would hinder the university's immediate development: hostility from the state's agricultural interests and competition for resources from Miami University and Ohio University. The first arose from the curriculum debate. Fueled by the agriculture interests and the Springfield business community that supplied them, the attitude of Ohio farmers towards the university had turned from one of indifference to one of outright hostility. By 1880, this hostility had begun to make its presence felt in the state legislature. The second hindrance came in the form of competition for state allocations from Ohio's two older public institutions. At the time of Ohio State's creation, these institutions had been derided by then Governor Hayes as borderline sectarian colleges that, in over sixty years of history, had failed to provide Ohio with a real state university. It was this view that was fundamental in the decision to found a new university as recipient for the Morrill Act funds, making Ohio unique among Great Lakes states in founding a new university for this purpose, as well as considerably strengthening the hand of those who advocated a broad based curriculum. However, the founding of this new university combined with their own precarious financial positions (Miami would close for a dozen years due to a lack of enrollment) had awakened the older institutions to compete vigorously for the attention of the state legislature. The first of these issues would be resolved by the end of the decade. Resolution of the second would not occur until 1906. Even then, the inherent tension of agricultural interests within the larger context of a comprehensive research university and the competition among state universities in a decentralized higher education system would, to varying degrees, remain permanent issues with which Ohio State would be forced to contend.

Of fundamental importance in this period was the role of former President Rutherford B. Hayes who, a decade earlier, had lobbied strenuously as Governor for the university's founding. Upon returning to Ohio in 1881, the former President spent the next decade using his considerable political influence to lobby for the university's interests. In 1887 he formally joined the university's board of trustees where, until his death in early 1893, he essentially acted as the university's de facto president. By 1891, Ohio State had grown to a degree that Governor James E. Campbell recommended a permanent levy on the tax duplicate to support its continued growth. The significant role that the fledgling university had begun to play within the state, as well as the peace that Hayes had brokered with the state's agricultural interests, was underscored by the fact that the proposal passed without opposition despite the insistence of Ohio State's board of trustees that neither Miami nor Ohio universities be included in the bill.

=== Emergence as urban research university (1892–1916) ===
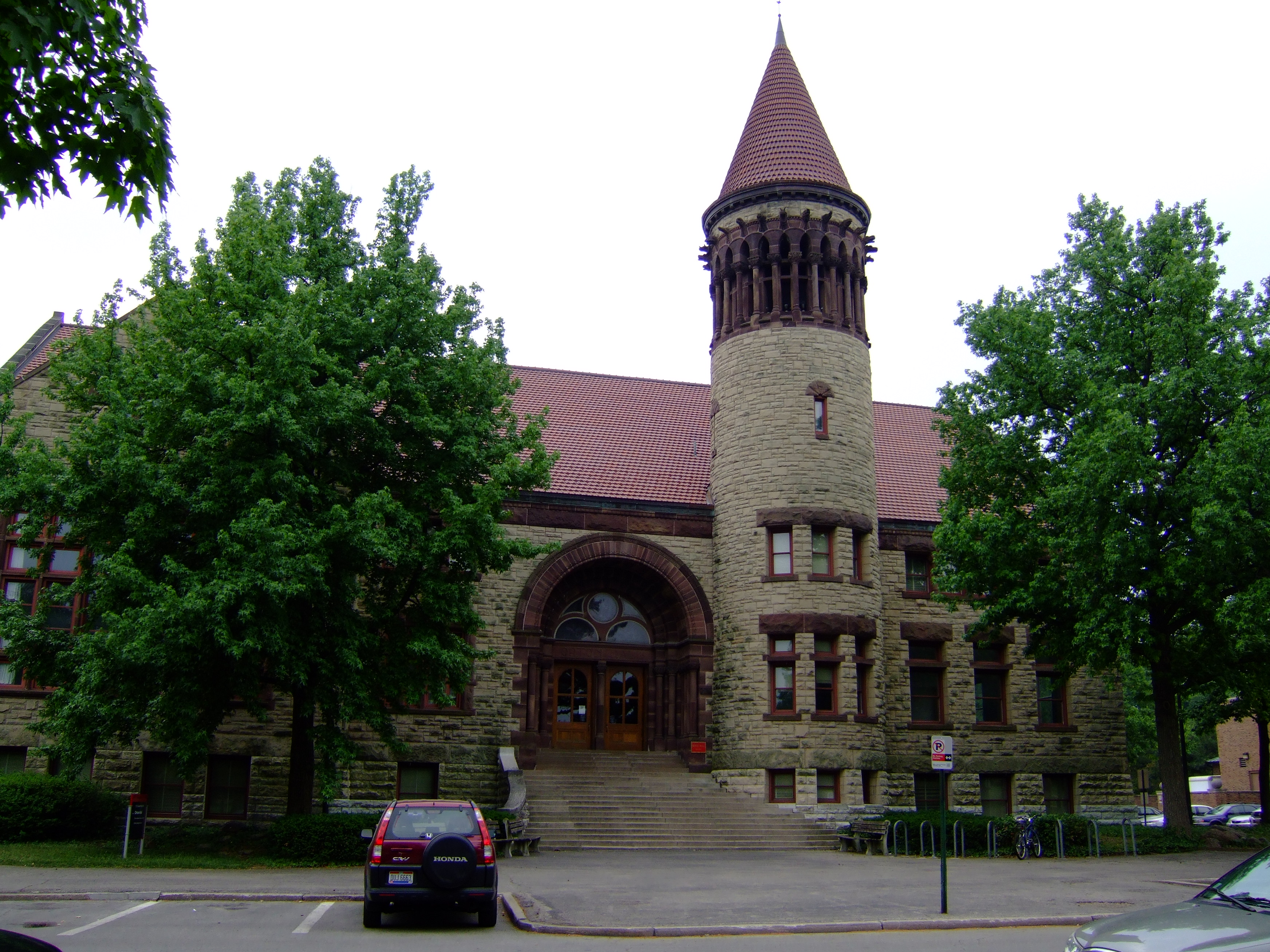
OSU's Orton Hall, completed in 1893.

University Hall, c. 1900-1910

Ohio State began accepting graduate students in the 1880s, with the university awarding its first master's and doctoral degrees in 1886 and 1890 respectively. 1891 saw the founding of Ohio State's law school, the Moritz College of Law. It would later acquire colleges of medicine, dentistry, optometry, veterinary medicine, commerce, and journalism in subsequent years.

In 1905, Jessie Frances Stephens became the first African-American woman to graduate from Ohio State University.

In 1906, Ohio State segregationist President William Oxley Thompson along with the university's supporters in the state legislature put forth the Lybarger Bill with the aim of shifting virtually all higher education support to the continued development of Ohio State while funding only the "normal school" functions of Miami and Ohio University. Although the Lybarger Bill failed narrowly to gain passage, in its place was passed the compromise Eagleson Bill, which determined that all doctoral education and research functions would be the role of Ohio State and that the two older institutions would not offer instruction beyond the master's degree level. This arrangement would stand for the next fifty years until population growth had necessitated additional Ph. D programs in the state.

In 1911, President William Oxley Thompson wrote in a letter, "the race problem is growing in intensity every year, and I am disposed to doubt the wisdom on the part of the colored people of taking any move that practically forces the doctrine of social equality." At the same time, Ohio State "practiced racial segregation" that was widespread across the country at the time against Black students, and "there is no known evidence [Thompson] saw benefits in addressing it." After recent attempts at removing Thompson's statue from the Oval, university spokesperson Ben Johnson stated "the naming review process is thoughtful and thorough and therefore could take several years," and as of today, the statue has not been removed.

1912 saw the formation of Ohio State's Graduate School to coordinate the university's burgeoning master's and doctoral enrollments. In 1914, Ohio State's college of medicine was formed through a merger with Starling Medical College. That year also saw the founding of Ohio State's School of Dentistry. In 1916, the board of trustees approved the formation of a College of Commerce and Journalism.

Subsequently, Ohio State's solidifying of its role as the state's flagship, comprehensive university was fairly rapid, as demonstrated by its 1916 induction into the prestigious Association of American Universities. To date, it remains the only public university in Ohio to be extended AAU membership.

=== Growth and challenge (1917–1945) ===
This momentum was further accelerated by Governor Harry L. Davis, who in his 1921 inaugural address declared that, "In Ohio State University the commonwealth has an educational institution which should become the largest and best state institution in the United States. This is evidenced by the development of the institution in recent years, and I desire specifically to ask the co-operation of the General Assembly in the effort which I propose to make to help the Ohio State University to attain that goal in the not too distant future." He subsequently shepherded a one-eighth of a mill tax levy through the legislature to fund a university building fund. Seventy-two percent of the funds were earmarked for the Ohio State University with the remainder split between Ohio University and Miami University. By decade's end, the university's enrollment stood at 15,126 a more than fourfold increase from just twenty years prior.

With the onset of the Great Depression, Ohio State would face many of the challenges affecting universities throughout America as budget support was slashed, and students without the means of paying tuition returned home to support families. By the middle thirties, however, enrollment had stabilized due in large part to the role of FERA (the Federal Emergency Relief Administration) and later the NYA (National Youth Administration). By the end of the decade, enrollment had still managed to grow to 17,568. Two important initiatives were also begun during this decade. Each would come to play increasingly important roles in the university's development up to the present time. In 1934, the Ohio State Research Foundation was begun to bring in outside funding for faculty research projects. In 1938, a development office was opened to begin raising funds privately to offset reductions in state support.

=== 1946–present ===
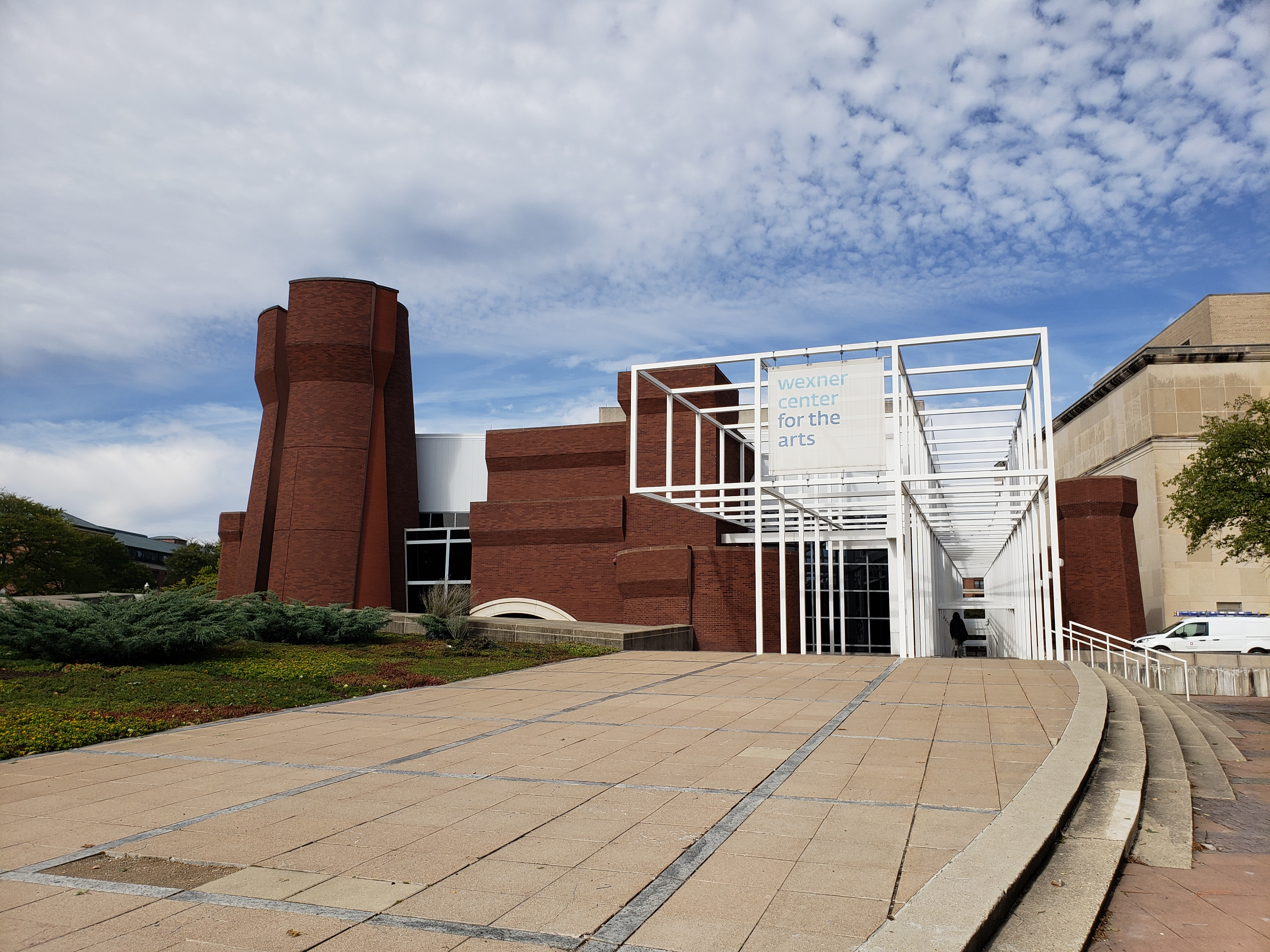
The Wexner Center for the Arts building was completed in 1989

In 1952, Ohio State founded the interdisciplinary Mershon Center for International Security Studies, which it still houses. In 2003, the United States Department of Homeland Security decided to base the National Academic Consortium for Homeland Security at the university.

The bitter and sudden formation of Ohio State University in Columbus commenced a centuries-long conflict for funds ensue between the state's oldest, established institution and the new agricultural and manufacturing university. In one incident, Ohio State attempted to use Ohio University's federally trademarked name “OHIO” on its athletic uniforms; however, during the subsequent legal dispute, presidents of the two schools agreed Ohio State should not be permitted the use of that name on uniforms.

Presently, the university has reached the ranking of becoming a Public Ivy, as well as receiving high rankings and awards from many institutions, including U.S. News, Academic Ranking of World Universities, The Lombardi Program on Measuring University Performance, Carnegie Foundation for the Advancement of Teaching, and The Public Accounting Report.

The university now provides education to about 68,262 students in eight campuses throughout Ohio and is governed by President Walter E. Carter Jr..

== Significant historical events ==
=== 1969–1970 Vietnam War protests ===
Throughout 1969, anti-Vietnam War protest tensions grew on Ohio State's campus. What is now Bricker Hall was occupied by students, but after being told they had "five minutes to leave, or they'd be arrested", students departed from the building. In late April 1970, anti-war riots ensued on Ohio State campus, leading to nearly 300 arrests, over 60 injuries, and seven gunshot wounds. Students began "boycotting classes with a student strike, protesting the university's rejection of a list of demands presented the week before. Specific demands included adding black and women's studies to the university's courses." On April 29, 1970, five days before the Kent State shootings, students picketed buildings, but this initially peaceful protest "started to spiral out of control" after Ohio State Highway Patrol troopers arrived in riot gear. When a man was assaulted by three students, tear gas was deployed, in response to which protesters threw rocks at the National Guard. Seven students were struck with a shotgun blast near the Student Union. There were no casualties, and the shooter was not identified.

=== 1978–1998 Richard Strauss sexual abuse scandal ===
The Ohio State University abuse scandal centered on allegations of sexual abuse that occurred between 1978 and 1998, while Richard Strauss was employed as a physician by the Ohio State University (OSU) in the Athletics Department and in the Student Health Center. An independent investigation into the allegations was announced in April 2018 and was conducted by the law firm Perkins Coie.

In July 2018, several former wrestlers accused former head coach Russ Hellickson and U.S. representative Jim Jordan, who was an assistant coach at OSU between 1987 and 1994, of knowing about Strauss's alleged abuse but failing to take action to stop it. Jordan has denied that he had any student-athlete report sexual abuse to him.

The report, released in May 2019, concluded that Strauss abused at least 177 male student-patients and that OSU was aware of the abuse as early as 1979, but the abuse was not widely known outside of athletics or student health until 1996, when he was suspended from his duties. Strauss continued to abuse OSU students at an off-campus clinic until his retirement from the university in 1998. OSU was faulted in the report for failing to report Strauss's conduct to law enforcement.

In May 2020, the university entered into a settlement and agreed to pay $40.9 million to 162 sexual abuse survivors. Five lawsuits against the university are pending.

=== 2016 terrorist attack ===
On November 28, 2016, an Islamic terrorist vehicle-ramming and stabbing attack occurred at 9:52 a.m. EST at Ohio State University's Watts Hall in Columbus, Ohio. The attacker, Somali refugee Abdul Razak Ali Artan, was shot and killed by the first responding OSU police officer, and 13 people were hospitalized for injuries.

Authorities began investigating the possibility of the attack being an act of terrorism. On the next day, law enforcement officials stated that Artan was inspired by terrorist propaganda from the Islamic State of Iraq and the Levant (ISIL) and the late radical Muslim cleric, Anwar al-Awlaki. The Amaq News Agency released a statement claiming the attacker responded to an ISIL call to attack coalition citizens, though there is no evidence of direct contact between the group and Artan.

=== 2023 President Kristina M. Johnson resignation ===
In 2023, then-President Kristina M. Johnson "shocked the Ohio State University community" when she resigned from her position as president "just halfway through her contract". According to The Columbus Dispatch, this was due to Johnson deciding "she could no longer work with Les Wexner and certain trustees who are loyal to him and who push for his interests". Sources told The Columbus Dispatch that "Johnson and university leaders agreed not to speak publicly about the details surrounding her resignation", and she was replaced by Walter E. Carter Jr. the following school year.

=== 2024 pro-Palestinian campus protests ===
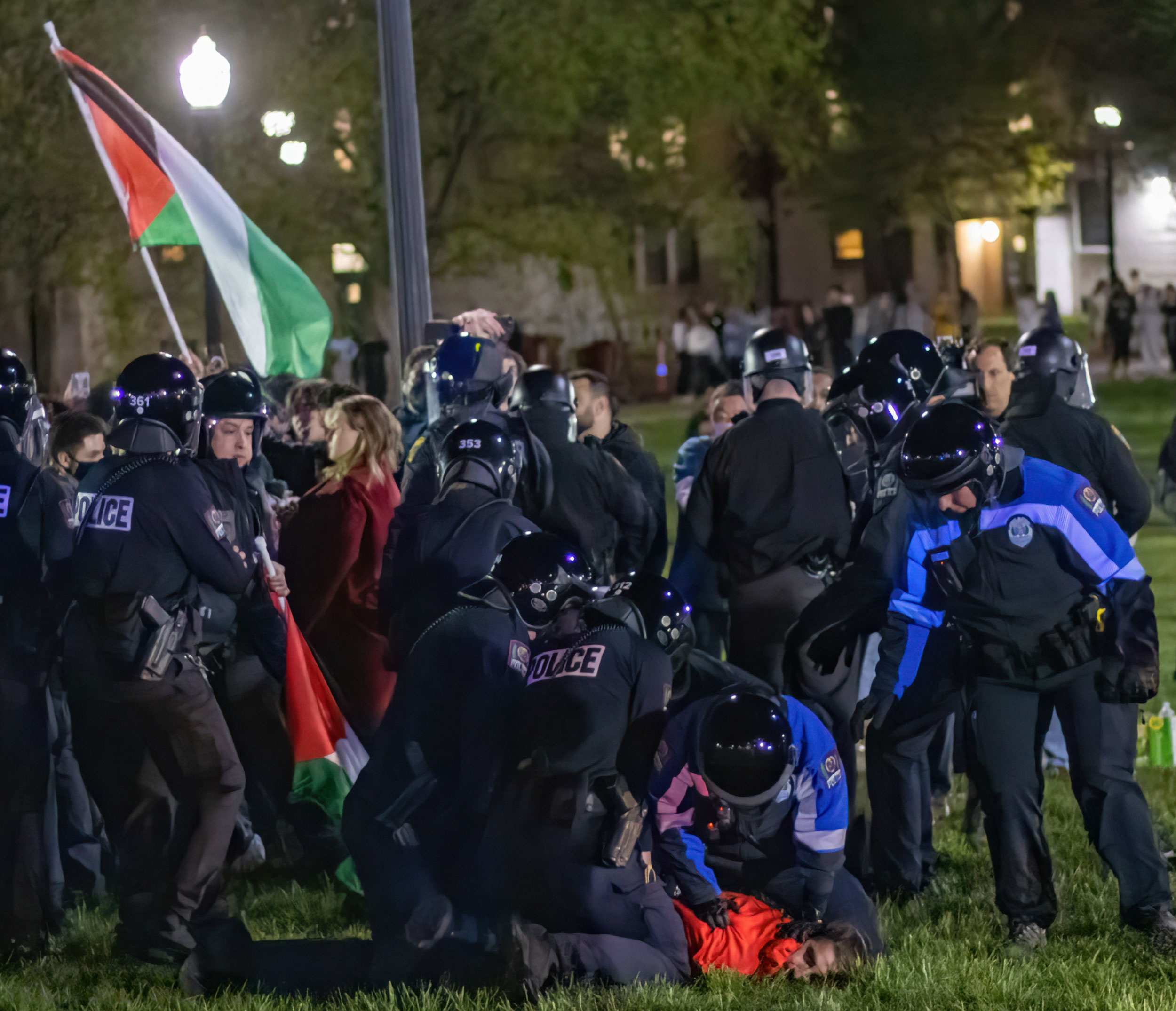
Officers arresting pro-Palestinian protester at the Gaza Solidarity Encampment

A series of protests at Ohio State University by pro-Palestinian demonstrators are ongoing and began on-campus following the outbreak of the Gaza war and genocide. A solidarity encampment was constructed on OSU's South Oval on April 25, 2024 in solidarity with the Columbia University encampment. Riot police then made 36 arrests against student protesters — the largest mass arrests in campus history since the 1969–1970 Vietnam War protests.

The protester demands of OSU include "financial divestment, academic boycott, financial disclosure, acknowledging the genocide, and ending targeted policing".

Pro-Palestinian groups have been critical of the university's responses to the protests, which have included allowing state troopers to aim sniper rifles at students during the dispersal of the Gaza Solidarity Encampment, suspending a pro-Palestinian student organization, and blocking the Undergraduate Student Government's attempts at passing legislation for financial divestment from Israel after receiving pressure from officials in Zionist organization Hillel International.

Following protests, the OSU administration coordinated multi-agency police operations, implemented a campus-wide chalking ban, and expelled pro-Palestinian social media influencer Guy Christensen; state-level officials floated invoking a 1953 anti-KKK statute against pro-Palestinian protesters who wore face coverings, suggested terminating faculty members who encourage or engage in "violence on campus", and passed the "CAMPUS" Act to formalize free speech restrictions; and officials in the Trump administration revoked the student visa of at least one pro-Palestinian protester at OSU and threatened to withdraw funding from OSU if they did not sufficiently "combat antisemitism" on campus. These actions have been met with multiple lawsuits over alleged violations of First and Fourteenth Amendment rights.

The university has insisted their actions are politically neutral, with OSU President Ted Carter stating the "university's long-standing space rules are content neutral and are enforced uniformly". Critics argue the university engages in selective enforcement of university space rules, enforcing policies disproportionately against pro-Palestinian groups and not similarly against other groups on campus.
