= Robert Ray Scott =

American Air Force officer

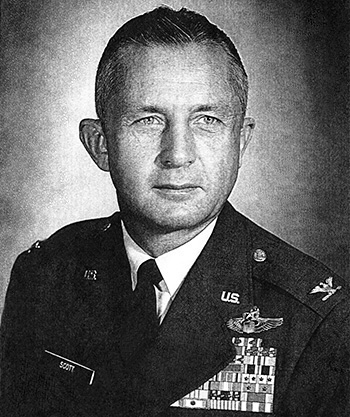
- Colonel Robert R. Scott in 1970
- Born: November 1, 1920; Des Moines, Iowa, U.S.
- Died: October 3, 2006 (aged 85); Tehachapi, California, U.S.
- Burial place: Arlington National Cemetery
- Military career
- Allegiance: United States
- Branch: United States Air Force
- Service years: 1941-1970
- Rank: Colonel
- Nickname: Bob
- Units: 426th Night Fighter Squadron; 8th Fighter-Bomber Group; 355th Tactical Fighter Wing
- Commands: 35th Fighter-Bomber Squadron; 510th Fighter-Bomber Squadron; 335th Tactical Fighter Squadron; 6002nd Standardization/Evaluation Group; 355th Tactical Fighter Wing; 832nd Air Division
- Conflicts: World War II; Korean War; Vietnam War
- Awards: Silver Star (4); Legion of Merit (3); Distinguished Flying Cross (6); Air Medal (16)

Robert Ray Scott (November 1, 1920 – October 3, 2006) was a career officer in the United States Air Force, who flew combat missions in World War II, Korean War and Vietnam War.

== Early life ==
Scott was born at Des Moines, Iowa, on 1920 to Ray Scott and Elva M. Scott. After graduating from North High School in Des Moines in January 1939, he studied aeronautical engineering at the University of Iowa for two years.

== Military career ==
On August 15, 1941, he enlisted in the Aviation Cadet Program of the U.S. Army Air Corps, and was commissioned as a second lieutenant and earned his pilot wings on 16 March 1942. Afterwards, he was assigned as an instructor pilot at Victorville Army Air Field in California, from March 1942 to January 1944. At this time, he was promoted to first lieutenant.

=== World War II ===
In January 1944, he was assigned as a P-61 Black Widow night fighter pilot with the 426th Night Fighter Squadron. Initially stationed at Hammer Field and Delano Airport in California, the squadron moved to British India on 29 June and later to China on 9 August, where the squadron and their detachments were deployed and flew missions from airfields in the Chinese provinces of Sichuan, Yunnan and Shaanxi. During his time with the 426th NFS, Scott was credited in destroying two Japanese aircraft in aerial combat and was awarded the Distinguished Flying Cross and the Air Medal. He was promoted to captain on May 3, 1944, and to major on August 16, 1945.

=== Cold war ===
After the end of the war, Scott served as an advisor to the Republic of China Air Force and an instructor with Air University at Maxwell Air Force Base in Alabama, from September 1947 to August 1948. In January 1951, he graduated with a bachelor's and master's degree from Iowa State University after receiving an Air Force Institute of Technology assignment to do so.

From July 1952 to October 1952, served as an F-86D Sabre Dog project officer with Air Proving Ground Command at Eglin Air Force Base.

After completing Fighter Bomber Escort Training at Nellis Air Force Base in Nevada in February 1953, Scott was as an F-86 Sabre pilot with the 8th Fighter-Bomber Group in February 1953 and was appointed as commander of the 35th Fighter-Bomber Squadron in April 1953, during the Korean War. Stationed at Suwon Air Base in South Korea, he flew 117 missions during the war and was awarded the Silver Star on July 18, 1953. In October 1953, he was appointed as executive officer of the 8th Fighter-Bomber Group.

After returning to the United States in December 1953, he was appointed as commander of the 510th Fighter-Bomber Squadron at Langley Air Force Base in Virginia, where he flew the F-84 Thunderjet.

Scott appeared as a contestant on the CBS television program, I've Got a Secret, on the March 9, 1955 episode.

In 1966, Scott participated in the Vietnam War, as the commander of the 355th Tactical Fighter Wing at Takhli Royal Thai Air Force Base in Thailand, and flew a full tour of bombing and fighter missions over North Vietnam, while flying the F-105 Thunderchief. He was credited in destroying a North Vietnamese Air Force MiG-17 on March 26, 1967. He flew a total of 134 missions during the war.

He was appointed as commander of the 832nd Air Division at Cannon Air Force Base in New Mexico in September 1967. He retired from the Air Force on 1970.

== Later life ==
After his retirement from the Air Force, he worked for Fairchild Industries and later as vice-president for operations and chief pilot for Antilles International Airlines until retirement at the age of 60. After his complete retirement, he worked as a cattle rancher in New Mexico and California.

Scott died on October 3, 2006, at the age of 85, in Tehachapi, California. He was buried at Arlington National Cemetery.

== Awards and decorations ==
During his lengthy career, Scott earned many decorations, including:

USAF Command Pilot badge
Silver Star with three bronze oak leaf clusters
Legion of Merit with two bronze oak leaf clusters	Distinguished Flying Cross with 'V' device and silver oak leaf cluster	Air Medal with three silver oak leaf clusters
Joint Service Commendation Medal	Air Force Commendation Medal	Air Force Presidential Unit Citation with bronze oak leaf cluster
Air Force Outstanding Unit Award with 'V' device and two bronze oak leaf clusters	American Defense Service Medal	American Campaign Medal
Asiatic-Pacific Campaign Medal with four bronze campaign stars	World War II Victory Medal	National Defense Service Medal with service star
Korean Service Medal with two bronze campaign stars	Vietnam Service Medal with two bronze campaign stars	Air Force Longevity Service Award with silver and bronze oak leaf clusters
Small Arms Expert Marksmanship Ribbon	South Korean Order of National Security Merit; 3rd class with silver star	Vietnam Armed Forces Honor Medal; 1st Class
Republic of Korea Presidential Unit Citation	Republic of Vietnam Gallantry Cross	United Nations Service Medal for Korea
Vietnam Campaign Medal	Republic of China War Memorial Medal	Korean War Service Medal

== See also ==
- Robin Olds
