= Joseph Grieco =

American political scientist

- Born: 1953 (age 72–73)
- Citizenship: American
- Education: Cornell University (PhD)
- Occupation: Political scientist
- Employer: Duke University

Joseph M. Grieco (born 1953) is an American political scientist. He is a professor of political science at Duke University, in Durham, North Carolina. Within international relations theory he is a neorealist and is a key figure in the debate between neorealists and neoliberals.

== Education ==
Grieco received a PhD from Cornell University in 1982.

== Career ==
Grieco joined Duke's Trinity College of Arts & Sciences as an assistant professor of political science in 1981.

== Publications ==
=== Books ===
- Between Dependency and Autonomy: India's Experience With the International Computer Industry (University of California Press, 1984)
- Cooperation among Nations : Europe, America, and non-tariff barriers to trade (Cornell University Press, 1990)

=== Articles ===
- External Threats and Public Opinion: The East Asian Security Environment and Japanese Views on the Nuclear Option, Journal of East Asian Studies, February 14, 2023 (co-authored with Naoko Matsumura and Atsushi Tago)
- Competency Costs in Foreign Affairs: Presidential Performance in International Conflicts and Domestic Legislative Success, 1953–2001, American Journal of Political Science, December 16, 2014 (co-authored with Christopher Gelpi)
