= Francis Beer =

American political scientist

Francis A. Beer
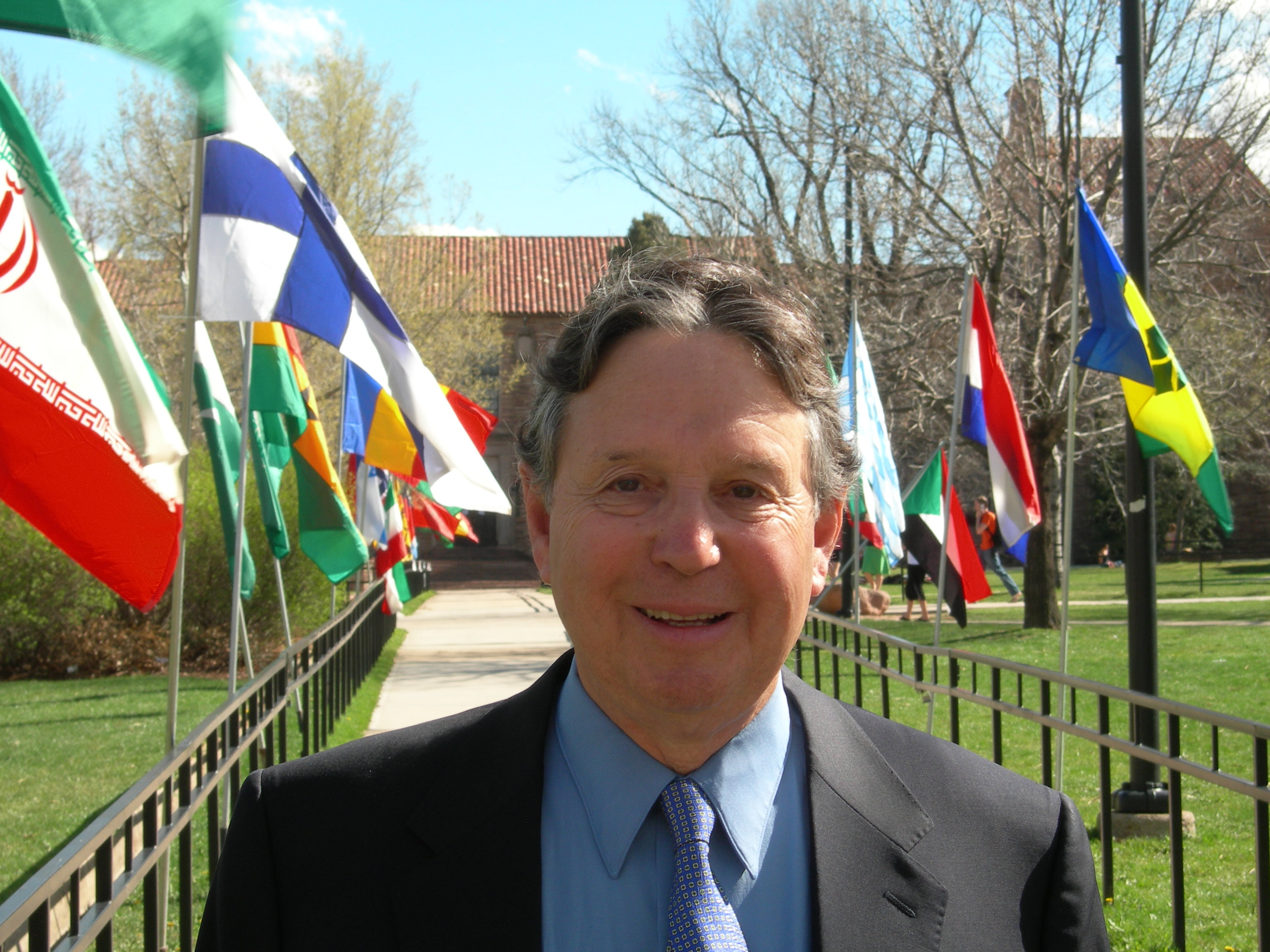
- Born: February 5, 1939 (age 86); New York NY
- Spouse: Diana Darnall Beer
- Children: Omar Lawrence, Marie Juliette, Jeremy Heywood
- Website: www.colorado.edu/faculty/beer/

Francis A. Beer is an American professor emeritus of political science, University of Colorado at Boulder. His research focuses on war and peace. Honors and awards include listings in Who's Who in the World and Who's Who in America, as well as other directories. He was president of the International Studies Association/West and co-edited, with Ted Gurr at the University of Colorado, a series of Sage books on "Violence, Conflict, Cooperation." In addition to two Fulbright awards to France and the Netherlands he has received other awards from the Earhart Foundation, the Institute for World Order, and the National Endowment for the Humanities. At the University of Colorado, he represented the faculty as chair of the Boulder Faculty Assembly.

== Biography ==
=== Education ===
Francis A. Beer graduated from the Fay School and the Phillips Exeter Academy. He received his A.B. (1960) from Harvard in government and M.A. (1963) and Ph.D. (1967) in political science from the University of California, Berkeley.

=== Career ===
After leaving Harvard, he spent two years in the Philippines as a communications officer with the U.S. Navy, leaving with the rank of Lieutenant. He returned to the University of California, Berkeley, where he completed graduate work in political science. He specialized in international relations and received a Fulbright award to France to study the North Atlantic Treaty Organization and took a pre-doctoral year at the Mershon Center of the Ohio State University. He received another Fulbright award to the Netherlands to study the Organization for Economic Cooperation and Development. He subsequently taught for many years at the University of Texas at Austin and the University of Colorado in Boulder. At the University of Colorado, he served as Director of the Conflict and Peace Studies Program and as Chair of the Boulder Faculty Assembly. He was a visiting professor at Cambridge University in England and the University of Bordeaux in France.

Francis A. Beer is the author of such scientific publications: "Meanings of War and Peace", "Peace Against War: The Ecology of International Violence", "Integration and Disintegration in NATO: Processes of Alliance Cohesion and Prospects for Atlantic Community". In his publications he considers the formation and functioning of international alliances through the theoretical ideas of postrealism. His publications have also been translated into Arabic and French.

=== Family and personal life ===
He married his wife, Diana Darnall Beer before leaving Berkeley in 1965. His family includes two sons (Omar and Jeremy), a daughter (Marie), two daughters in law (Caroline and Jessica), and four grandsons (Augustus Charles, Solomon Jackson, Arlo Fletcher, and Ethan West).

== Research of war and peace ==
Beer's scientific publications has specialized on the nature, causes, and consequences of war and peace and their dialectical essence. His articles were published in the Oxford International Encyclopedia of International Peace and in the World Encyclopedia of Peace and has contributed to knowledge about war and peace in a number of different areas.

=== Historical trends and statistics of War and Peace ===
Professor F. A. Beer found that periods of major peace have tended to become longer over time. And the wars are generally getting shorter accordingly, but more serious in terms of their destructive power. On his opinion, these are general tendencies. However, trends and statistics are less clear for a smaller and separate sample of countries, such as Professor F.A. Beer draws on the experience of war and peace in the United States. In this context, examples are given of the wars in Vietnam, Afghanistan and Iraq.

=== Alliances as Latent War Communities ===
Francis A. Beer in his publication "Integration and Disintegration in NATO: Processes of Alliance Cohesion and Prospects for Atlantic Community" has shown how geopolitical actors who joined military-political alliances, such as NATO, for example, create local international communities that are essentially both integrative and disintegrative. According to the professor, members of NATO help maintain the internal peace of members, but are ready to wage war against external geopolitical actors. So the Alliance's institutions provide a framework through which members contribute a variety of resources and receive both collective and private benefits.

== Books and Monographs ==
- Metaphorical World Politics (Francis A. Beer and Christ'l de Landtsheer, Eds.) (East Lansing MI: Michigan State University Press, 2004).
- Meanings of War and Peace. (College Station: Texas A&M University Press, 2001).
- Post-Realism: The Rhetorical Turn in International Relations, Francis A. Beer and Robert Hariman, Eds. (East Lansing MI: Michigan State University Press, 1996).
- Peace against War: The Ecology of International Violence. (San Francisco: W. H. Freeman, 1981).
- How Much War in History: Definitions, Estimates Extrapolations, and Trends. (Beverly Hills: Sage, 1975).
- The Political Economy of Alliances: Benefits, Costs, and Institutions in NATO. (Beverly Hills: Sage, 1972).
- Alliances: Latent War Communities in the Contemporary World, edited. (New York: Holt, Rinehart, Winston, 1970).
- Integration and Disintegration in NATO: Processes of Alliance Cohesion and Prospects for Atlantic Community. (Columbus: Ohio State University Press, 1969).
