= Kužel =

Kužel is a Czech and Slovak surname, derived from kužel meaning "distaff" or "cone", which originally was a descriptive name for a person with a cone-shaped head, or a nickname for an inconstant person. The name may refer to:

- Lukáš Kužel (born 1991), Czech ice hockey player
- Rastislav Kužel (born 1975), Slovak sprint canoer
