= Michael Dugan (general) =

US Air Force general

Michael J. Dugan
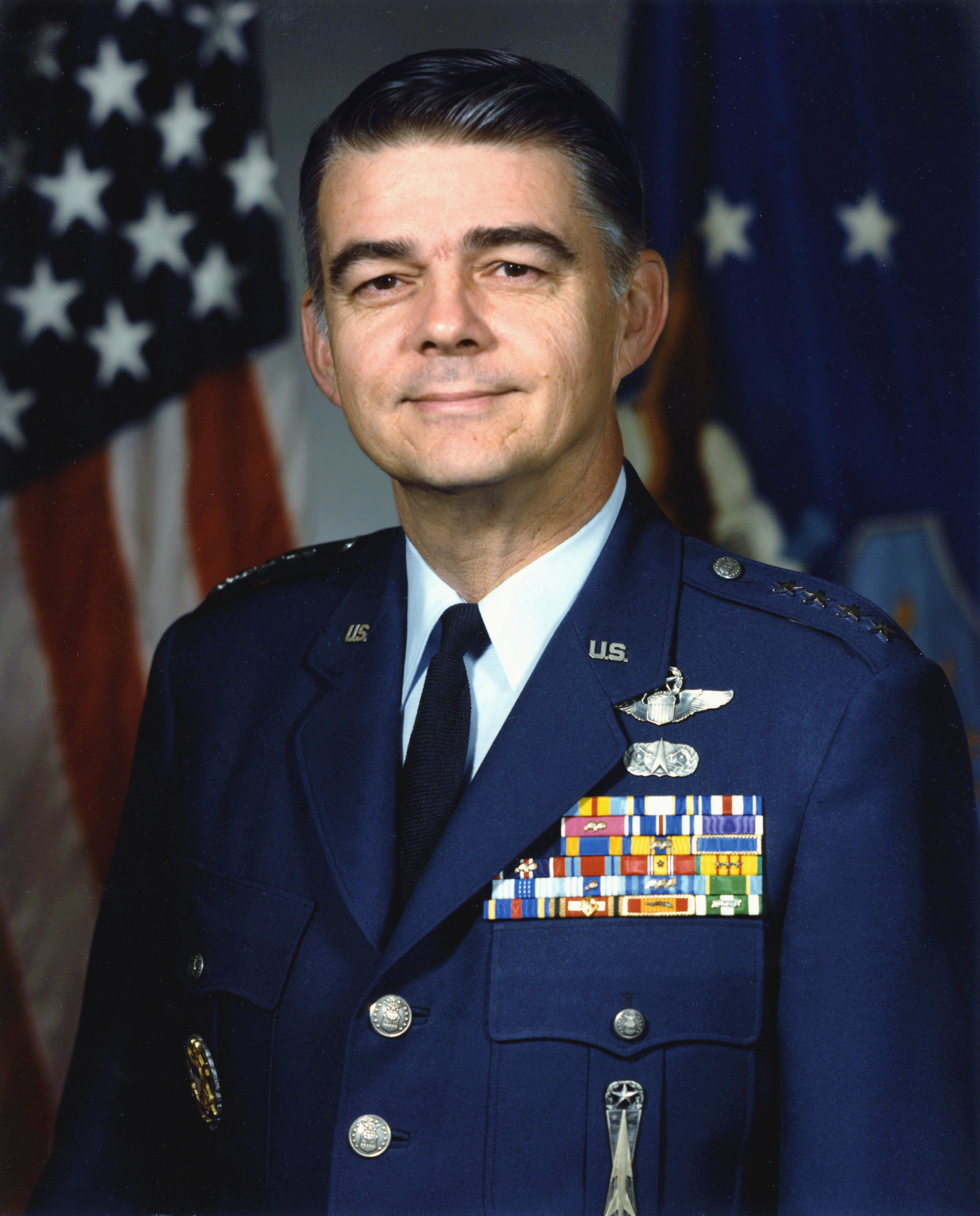
- Born: Michael Joseph Dugan; February 22, 1937 (age 89); Albany, New York, U.S.
- Military career
- Allegiance: United States
- Branch: United States Air Force
- Service years: 1958–1991
- Rank: General
- Commands: Chief of Staff of the United States Air Force; 832d Air Division; 23rd Tactical Fighter Wing; 355th Tactical Fighter Wing
- Conflicts: Vietnam War
- Awards: Defense Distinguished Service Medal; Air Force Distinguished Service Medal (2); Silver Star; Legion of Merit (3); Distinguished Flying Cross; Purple Heart; Air Medal

Michael Joseph Dugan (born February 22, 1937) is a retired American general. He was briefly the 13th Chief of Staff of the United States Air Force (USAF) for 79 days in 1990 until he was dismissed by U.S. Secretary of Defense Dick Cheney after telling reporters that the U.S. military planned to target Iraqi president Saddam Hussein, his family, and even his mistress in the 1991 Gulf War. He became the first member of the Joint Chiefs of Staff to be dismissed since Admiral Louis Denfeld in 1949, and the first top general to be relieved since General Douglas MacArthur in 1951.

== Early life and education ==
Dugan was born in Albany, New York. He earned a Bachelor of Science degree from the United States Military Academy in 1958, and a Master of Business Administration degree from the University of Colorado in 1972. He completed Squadron Officer School in 1965, Air Command and Staff College in 1970 and the Air War College in 1973.

== Military career ==
Dugan's early operational assignments were in F-100 Super Sabres and A-1 Skyraiders during the Vietnam War. He flew A-1s during 1967, from Pleiku Air Base, Republic of Vietnam, and Nakhon Phanom Royal Thai Air Force Base, Thailand. He then planned and taught cadet military training courses and served as cadet squadron and group air officer commanding at the United States Air Force Academy.

From June 1973 to July 1977, Dugan was assigned to Headquarters USAF, Washington, D.C., as an action officer and branch chief in the Office of the Deputy Chief of Staff, Plans and Operations, and then as executive to the vice chief of staff. He next served at Davis-Monthan Air Force Base, Arizona, as vice commander and, later, commander of the 355th Tactical Fighter Wing. He subsequently became commander of the 23rd Tactical Fighter Wing, England AFB, Louisiana, and commander of the 832d Air Division, Luke AFB, Arizona.

In May 1982, he moved to Langley AFB, Virginia, where he served successively as Tactical Air Command's assistant deputy chief of staff for operations, inspector general and deputy chief of staff for operations. He was assigned to the deputy chief of staff for plans and operations at USAF headquarters as director of operations in June 1986, and as assistant deputy chief of staff in January 1987. He became the USAF deputy chief of staff, programs and resources, in July 1987. He then became deputy chief of staff, plans and operations, in March 1988.

Dugan assumed command of United States Air Forces in Europe on April 12, 1989 and was promoted to general on May 1, 1989, with the same date of rank. He went on to become Chief of Staff of the United States Air Force in July 1990.

As chief, he served as the senior uniformed USAF officer responsible for the organization, training and equipage of a combined active duty, Air National Guard, Reserve and civilian force of nearly 1 million people serving at approximately 3,000 locations in the United States and overseas. As a member of the Joint Chiefs of Staff, he and the other service chiefs functioned as the principal military advisers to the Secretary of Defense, National Security Council and the President. During his brief tenure as Chief of Staff, Alaskan Air Command stood down, and was reduced to Numbered Air Force status as Headquarters, Eleventh Air Force, falling under the jurisdiction of Pacific Air Forces.

Dugan is a command pilot with 4,500 flying hours and 300 combat missions. His military decorations include the Air Force Distinguished Service Medal, Silver Star, Legion of Merit with two oak leaf clusters, Distinguished Flying Cross, Purple Heart, Air Medal, Air Force Commendation Medal with two oak leaf clusters and Republic of Vietnam Gallantry Cross with Palm.

== Removal from post ==
In September 1990, during the lead-up to the Gulf War after Saddam Hussein's Iraq had invaded Kuwait, Dugan told reporters that the U.S. military had plans to bomb Baghdad "relentlessly" and "decapitate" the Iraqi leadership by targeting Hussein personally, along with his family, his senior commanders, his palace guard and even his mistress. He said that he had personally "assigned a team to find Iraqi military defectors, knowledgeable professors, Iraqi expatriates and journalists who recently have visited Baghdad to learn more about Iraqi culture" so that he could get "a better list" of targets that would cause the most psychological damage to the Iraqi people if bombed. The list stressed the importance of attacking Hussein and his inner circle, but beyond that, Dugan would not detail the potential Iraqi leverage points he intend[ed] to try to destroy.

U.S. Secretary of Defense Dick Cheney, who had warned Dugan previously about speaking with journalists because he was known to be "loose-lipped," fired Dugan, saying he had shown "poor judgment at a sensitive time" adding, "We never talk about the targeting of specific individuals who are officials of other governments. Taking such action might be a violation of the standing presidential executive order 'banning assassinations.'" Dugan was replaced by General Merrill McPeak and retired from the Air Force on January 1, 1991.

On January 17, 1991, the aerial bombardment of Iraq began which destroyed much of the civilian and military infrastructure of Iraq, though Saddam Hussein, his family, and mistress were unharmed.

After being removed from office, Dugan remained on active duty while transitioning into retirement. He was allowed to hold onto his four-star rank, and was reassigned as the Special Assistant to the Secretary of the Air Force. The Senate approved Dugan's four-star retirement rank and he retired from the Air Force on January 1, 1991.

== Post-military career ==
Dugan went on to serve as the president of the National Multiple Sclerosis Society and is now President Emeritus of that organization.

== See also ==
- List of commanders of USAFE

Military offices
Preceded by Larry D. Welch	Chief of Staff of the United States Air Force; 1990	Succeeded by John M. Loh (acting)
