= Kimberly Marten =

Professor of Political Science at Barnard College

- Born: Minnesota, US

Academic background
- Education: Harvard University; Stanford University

Academic work
- Discipline: political science
- Institutions: Barnard College; Harriman Institute; Ohio State University
- Main interests: international security foreign policy Russia environmental politics
- Notable works: Engaging the Enemy: Organization Theory and Soviet Military Innovation

Kimberly Marten is an American author and scholar specializing in international security, foreign policy, Russia, and environmental politics. She held the 5-year-term Ann Whitney Olin Professorship of Political Science at Barnard College from 2013 to 2018, and then returned to chair the Barnard Political Science Department for a second time from 2018-2021. She was the director of the Program on U.S.-Russia Relations at Columbia University's Harriman Institute from 2015 to 2019, and the Harriman Institute published a profile of her career. She is a member of the Council on Foreign Relations and the International Institute for Strategic Studies, and a frequent media commentator.

== Early life and education ==
Marten was born and raised in Minnesota. She was on her high school debate and speech team, and competed in the nationals tournament. She earned her A.B. in Government at Harvard University (she graduated magna cum laude and was a member of the Phi Beta Kappa honor society) in 1985 and her Ph.D. in political science at Stanford University in 1991. She held a post-doctoral position at Stanford's Center for International Security and Arms Control (since renamed the Center for International Security and Cooperation).

== Career ==
Marten was an assistant professor in the Political Science Department at the Ohio State University from 1991 to 1997, where she was also affiliated with the Mershon Center. During her time there, she spent a year as a visiting scholar at the Olin Institute at Harvard University. She then moved to Barnard College, where she was tenured in 2000. She received a Hitachi International Affairs Fellowship in Japan from the Council on Foreign Relations, and was a visiting fellow at the Institute for International Policy Studies in Tokyo. Marten became a full professor at Barnard in 2005. She served as the Political Science department chair from 2006 to 2009 and then again from 2018 to 2021. While at Barnard she has also held a variety of positions at Columbia University's Harriman Institute for Russian, Eurasian, and East European Studies.

== Books and major publications ==
Kimberly Marten's research uses case studies, based mostly on primary sources and her own interviews with policy makers around the world. Her recent work analyzes Russian foreign and security policy, including a special focus on Russia's Wagner Group private military company and Russian intelligence agencies. Her 2018 article in International Politics explains President Vladimir Putin's decision to interfere in the 2016 U.S. election; another in the European Journal of International Security reexamines the causes and effects of NATO enlargement on Russia's relationship with the West, using counterfactual analysis. She wrote a 2017 Council on Foreign Relations report, Reducing Tensions between Russia and NATO, as well as articles on Russian President Vladimir Putin's decision to intervene in Ukraine and his actions towards pre-war Syria and Iran.

Her first book, Engaging the Enemy: Organization Theory and Soviet Military Innovation (Princeton University Press, 1993, published under her former name of Kimberly Marten Zisk), received the Marshall Shulman Prize from the Association for Slavic, Eurasian, and East European Studies. The book shows that Soviet military officers from the late 1950s onward engaged in lively debates about how to respond to changes in U.S. and NATO military doctrine in Europe, and spearheaded innovations that led to a doctrine race with the West.

Her second book, Weapons, Culture, and Self-Interest: Soviet Defense Managers in the New Russia (Columbia University Press, 1997), explored why Russian defense industrial enterprises struggled so badly when faced with the end of Soviet central planning. She demonstrated that what appeared to be poor decisions in the face of Soviet cultural overhang were actually remarkably adept reactions by defense industrial managers to the incentives of the new market economy; they simply put their own individual interests above the health of their enterprises. She wrote a related article about conflicts in the formerly closed Soviet nuclear city of Arzamas-16 as it adapted to the market economy.

Marten's next book, Enforcing the Peace: Learning from the Imperial Past, stepped away from Russia. It argues that UN Security Council authorized peace enforcement operations led by Western countries (in Haiti, Bosnia, Kosovo, and East Timor) bore a remarkable resemblance to the colonial activities of Great Britain, France, and the United States at the turn of the twentieth century. At a time when it was fashionable to say that militaries can't do peacekeeping, she demonstrated that well designed military missions could restore peace to insecure regions and even do policing well; success depended on how they were trained and how missions were prioritized. In a related article she argued that ensuring stability in the target state was necessary before political reforms could be cemented.

Her most recent book, Warlords: Strong-Arm Brokers in Weak States (Cornell University Press, 2012, in the Cornell Studies on Security Affairs series), showed why and how “warlords” (armed local power brokers) undermine state sovereignty rather than being state-builders, and explained how states that need to cooperate with warlords (for example, on peace operations) should proceed. The book examines warlordism in the tribal areas of Pakistan, post-Soviet Georgia and Chechnya, and in Iraq during the U.S. intervention.

This project led to a number of spin-off pieces. In an article in International Security she compares modern warlords in Somalia and Afghanistan to feudal lords in medieval Europe. In a later book chapter she debunks the “stationary bandit” myth, arguing that legal norms always limited and shaped European state-building in a way far different from modern warlordism. In an article in International Peacekeeping Marten details how Israeli and U.S. support for Palestinian Authority security forces has unintentionally entrenched corrupt warlordism there, and in another book chapter she describes a similar situation that limited the effectiveness of the Afghan Local Police. She has also written about warlordism and militias in Ukraine, analyzing their dangers with co-author Olga Oliker. Her latest research project focuses on Russia's Wagner Group, of which she has become one of the leading US experts.
