= David P. Houghton =

- Born: David Patrick Houghton; November 21, 1966 (age 59); England
- Citizenship: UK / USA
- Education: University of Sheffield; University of Pittsburgh
- Scientific career
- Fields: International relations
- Workplaces: US Naval War College

David Patrick Houghton (born November 21, 1966) is a Senior Fellow/Associate at LSE IDEAS and a retired Professor of National Security Affairs at the US Naval War College.

== Education and early career ==
Houghton was born and raised in St. Helens and Warrington in the northwest of England, but he is of mostly Irish and Italian descent. He received a B.A with Honours in politics from the University of Sheffield in 1989. He also received an M.A. in political science from the University of Pittsburgh in 1992, and a Ph.D. from the same school in 1996 with a thesis on "The Role of Analogical Reasoning in Foreign and Domestic Policy Contexts".

He was then a lecturer in the Department of Government at the University of Essex from 1997 to 2003. From 2001 to 2002, he was a visiting scholar at the Mershon Center for International Security Studies at the Ohio State University, during a period of research leave from Essex. He taught at the University of Central Florida between 2003 and 2013, and was a senior lecturer in defence studies at King's College London from 2013 to 2016.

== Career ==
Houghton's areas of expertise are political psychology, foreign policy decision-making, American foreign policy and US-Iranian relations.

In addition to six books, he has published a number of peer-reviewed journal articles. One of his books, U.S. Foreign Policy and the Iran Hostage Crisis, was a 2002 Choice Outstanding Academic Title. He has also done media interviews on the Iran hostage crisis and other topics with The New York Times, Sky News, National Public Radio, WOFL (Fox 35 Orlando) and other outlets He is also a writer for Project Syndicate.

== Bibliography ==
=== Books ===
- Losing an Empire, Finding a Role: British Foreign Policy Since 1945 (Second Edition with David Sanders) London: Palgrave Macmillan, 2017.
- A Citizen's Guide to American Foreign Policy: Tragic Choices and the Limits of Rationality (Citizen Guides to Politics and Public Affairs) New York and London: Routledge, 2013.
- The Decision Point: Six Case Studies in U.S. Foreign Policy Decision-Making New York and Oxford: Oxford University Press, 2012.
- Political Psychology: Situations, Individuals, and Cases (New York and London: Routledge, 2009).
- Controversies in American Politics and Society with David McKay and Andrew Wroe. New York and Oxford: Basil Blackwell, 2002.
- U.S. Foreign Policy and the Iran Hostage Crisis New York and Cambridge: Cambridge University Press, 2001.
