= Lukáš Kužel =

Czech ice hockey player

- Born: July 22, 1991 (age 33)
- Height: 6 ft 2 in (188 cm)
- Weight: 185 lb (84 kg; 13 st 3 lb)
- Position: Defence
- Shoots: Left
- Czech Extraliga team: HC Kladno
- Playing career: 2011–present

Lukáš Kužel (born July 22, 1991) is a Czech professional ice hockey defenceman. He played with HC Kladno in the Czech Extraliga during the 2010–11 Czech Extraliga playoffs.
