= Joseph J. Kruzel =

American major general

Joseph John Kruzel
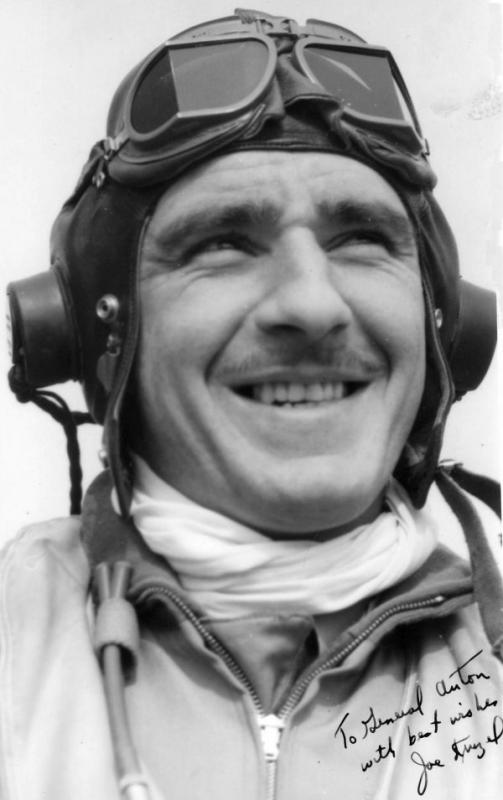
- Kruzel in 1944
- Born: February 17, 1918; Wilkes-Barre, Pennsylvania, U.S.
- Died: July 10, 2002 (aged 84); Mary Esther, Florida, U.S.
- Burial place: Arlington National Cemetery
- Military career
- Allegiance: United States
- Branch: United States Air Force
- Service years: 1940–1970
- Rank: Major general
- Nickname: Joe
- Units: 17th Pursuit Squadron; 9th Fighter Squadron; 361st Fighter Group
- Commands: 323rd Fighter Squadron; 361st Fighter Group; 18th Fighter Group; 354th Tactical Fighter Wing; 832nd Air Division; Fifth Air Force
- Conflicts: World War II
- Awards: Air Force Distinguished Service Medal; Silver Star (3); Legion of Merit; Distinguished Flying Cross (2); Bronze Star Medal; Air Medal (4)

Joseph John Kruzel (February 17, 1918 – July 10, 2002) was a United States Air Force major general and a flying ace during World War II.

== Early life ==
Kruzel was born on 1918 in Wilkes-Barre, Pennsylvania. He attended Scranton University, where he graduated with a bachelor's degree in chemistry in 1938 and bachelor's degree in education in 1939.

== Military career ==
On May 13, 1940, he joined the Aviation Cadet Program of the U.S. Army Air Corps and was commissioned a second lieutenant and awarded his pilot wings at Kelly Field in Texas, on December 20, 1940.

=== World War II ===
After receiving his pilot wings, Kruzel was assigned to 2d Observation Squadron at Clark Field in the Philippine Islands and later was transferred to 17th Pursuit Squadron at Nichols Field in Manila in September 1941, where they were equipped with P-40 Warhawks. Following the Japanese attack on Pearl Harbor and subsequent Japanese invasion of the Philippines in December 1941, Kruzel and much of the 17th PS evacuated to Australia and took part in the Dutch East Indies campaign.

On February 17, 1942, flying P-40s, Kruzel scored his first aerial victory when he shot down a Nakajima Ki-27 over Palembang. From February 19 to February 20, 1942, he shot down two A6M Zeroes. In March 1942, he joined the 9th Fighter Squadron in Australia and flew combat missions until returning to the U.S. in December 1942. He was promoted to captain on April 1, 1942, and logged over 175 combat hours.

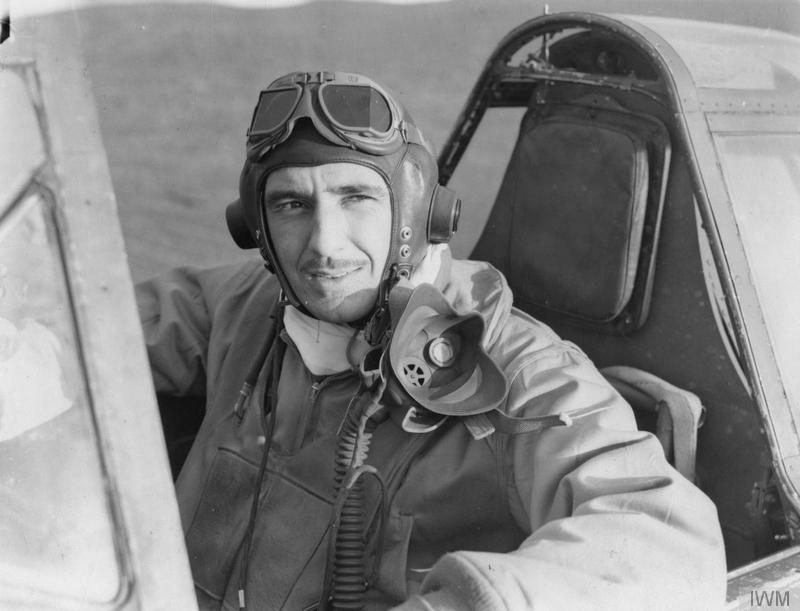
Kruzel sitting in the cockpit of his P-47 Thunderbolt

After his return to the United States, he was promoted to major on July 23, 1943, and assigned as commander of the 323d Fighter Squadron at Richmond Army Air Base in Virginia. Kruzel became Executive Officer of the 361st Fighter Group in March 1943. In November 1943, the group was deployed to England, where it was stationed at RAF Bottisham and received the P-47 Thunderbolts. The 361st FG began flying combat missions on January 21, 1944, and on February 22, Kruzel scored his first aerial victory over Europe and his fourth overall, when he shot down a Focke-Wulf Fw 190. He scored a shared aerial victory on April 29 and in May 1944, the 361st FG converted to P-51 Mustangs.

Kruzel became a flying ace on June 13, when he shot down a Messerschmitt Bf 109, his fifth aerial victory. He shot down a Fw 190 on June 25, his sixth and final aerial victory.

During World War II, Kruzel was credited with the destruction of 6.5 enemy aircraft with 1 damaged in the air and 1 shared destruction. While serving with the 361st FG, he flew P-51s bearing the name "Vi".

After his return to the U.S. in January 1945, he was assigned as an instructor trainee at Hillsgrove Army Air Base in Rhode Island, from January to March 1945 and as Deputy Commander of Seymour Johnson Field in North Carolina, which was a P-47 Combat Crew Training School and later a separation center, from March 1945 to January 1946.

=== Post war ===
In January 1946, Kruzel attended the senior officer's Asiatic Study Course at Yale University.

He was assigned to the Air Office of the XXIV Corps, in Seoul, Korea, in April 1946. He served with Headquarters Far East Air Forces in Tokyo, Japan, from May 1947 to September 1947, followed by a tour of duty as commander of the reactivated 18th Fighter Group, which was equipped with P-47 and subsequently P-51 aircraft at Clark Field in the Philippine Islands.

In 1949, Kruzel attended the Air Command and Staff College at Maxwell Air Force Base in Alabama and upon graduation was assigned to the War Plans Division at the Headquarters U.S. Air Force. He later attended the Air War College at Maxwell Air Force Base, graduating in June 1954. He was retained at the Air War College as a member of the Evaluation Staff through May 1957.

In June 1957, he was assigned as chief, War Plans Division, Headquarters U.S. Air Forces in Europe, at Wiesbaden, West Germany; and in January 1958 as chief, command post, Supreme Headquarters Allied Powers in Europe, in Paris, France.

He returned to the United States in July 1960 and attended the National War College. He next was assigned as vice commander of the 354th Tactical Fighter Wing, equipped with North American F-100 Super Sabres, at Myrtle Beach Air Force Base in South Carolina, and he became commander of the wing in April 1963. He assumed command of the 832nd Air Division at Cannon Air Force Base, in New Mexico, in January 1964.

In August 1965, Kruzel was assigned to Headquarters Pacific Air Forces at Hickam Air Force Base in Hawaii, as director of operations and in August 1966 became deputy chief of staff for operations. In August 1968 he was assigned as vice commander of Fifth Air Force with headquarters at Fuchu Air Station in Japan.

He returned to the United States and was assigned in August 1969 to Headquarters U.S. Air Force in the Pentagon as deputy director of operations, Deputy Chief of Staff, Plans and Operations until his retirement from the Air Force on August 1, 1970.

== Personal life ==
Kruzel married Violet Mable, née Clark (1923-1979) on 1945. They had four children and numerous grandchildren. Joseph J. Kruzel Jr. was their son.

On 1984, Kruzel remarried to Betty Sue, née Tucker.

== Later life ==
Kruzel died on July 10, 2002, at the age of 84. After memorial services held for him at West Chapel in Eglin Air Force Base, he was buried with full military honors alongside his first wife and son at Arlington National Cemetery.

== Aerial victory credits ==
Date	#	Type	Location	Aircraft flown	Unit Assigned
February 17, 1942	1	Nakajima Ki-27	Palembang, Dutch East Indies	P-40E Warhawk	77 FS, 20 FG
February 19, 1942	1	Mitsubishi A6M Zero	Surabaya, Dutch East Indies	P-40E	77 FS, 20 FG
February 20, 1942	1	A6M Zero	Bali, Dutch East Indies	P-40E	77 FS, 20 FG
February 22, 1944	1	Focke-Wulf Fw 190	Nijmegen, Netherlands	P-47D Thunderbolt	361 FG HQ
April 29, 1944	0.5	Messerschmitt Bf 109	Steinhude Lake, Germany	P-47D	361 FG HQ
June 13, 1944	1	Bf 109	Saint-Brieuc, France	P-51B Mustang	361 FG HQ
June 25, 1944	1	Fw 190	Lisieux, France	P-51B	361 FG HQ

SOURCES: Air Force Historical Study 85: USAF Credits for the Destruction of Enemy Aircraft, World War II

== Awards and decorations ==
His military decorations include the Silver Star with two oak leaf clusters, Legion of Merit, Distinguished Flying Cross with oak leaf cluster, Air Medal with three oak leaf clusters, and the Bronze Star Medal.

USAF Command pilot badge
Air Force Distinguished Service Medal
Silver Star with two bronze oak leaf clusters
Legion of Merit
Distinguished Flying Cross with bronze oak leaf cluster
Bronze Star Medal
Air Medal with three bronze oak leaf clusters
Air Force Presidential Unit Citation with two bronze oak leaf clusters
American Defense Service Medal with service star
American Campaign Medal
Asiatic-Pacific Campaign Medal with three bronze campaign stars
European-African-Middle Eastern Campaign Medal with four bronze campaign stars
World War II Victory Medal
Army of Occupation Medal with 'Japan' clasp
National Defense Service Medal with service star
Air Force Longevity Service Award with silver and bronze oak leaf clusters
Small Arms Expert Marksmanship Ribbon
