= Margaret Hermann =

American political psychologist (born 1938)

Margaret G. "Peg" Hermann (born 1938) is an American political psychologist who was the long-time director of the Moynihan Institute of Global Affairs at Syracuse University's Maxwell School of Citizenship and Public Affairs.

== Early life and education ==
Hermann grew up in Lexington, Kentucky, where her father served as a professor of sociology and her mother taught biology and chemistry at a local high school. After completing her undergraduate studies at DePauw University in Greencastle, Indiana in 1960. She subsequently obtained a master's degree and Ph.D. in psychology from Northwestern University, in 1963 and 1965, respectively. Hermann was a postdoctoral fellowship in the Personality Research Group at the Educational Testing Service. She was a postdoctoral fellow at the National Institute of Mental Health.

== Career ==
Hermann began her career as a visiting lecturer at Princeton University and began working at the Mershon Center for International Security Studies affiliated with Ohio State University, where she remained through 1998. She secured $2 million from the National Science Foundation to launch a summer institute in political psychology.

In 1998, she took on the Gerald B. and Daphna Cramer Professorship of Global Affairs at the Maxwell School of Citizenship and Public Affairs within Syracuse University. In 2000, she was named the director of what was then known as the Global Affairs Institute (GAI). In 2005, the institute received a $10-million endowment from Congress to rename the institute for the late senator Daniel Patrick Moynihan. She retired in March 2023.

Hermann has undertaken research work in areas related to international relations, comparative foreign policy, political leadership and its influence on foreign policy decision-making, crisis management, and the role of non-state actors in shaping foreign policy. Her research deals with developing techniques for assessing the leadership styles of government heads from a distance and she has curated such data on over 500 leaders.

Hermann was the founding editor of the journal Political Psychology between 1980 and 1982, and the Mershon International Studies Review from 1993 to 1998. Hermann served as the founding editor of the same journal between 2003 and 2007, by which time it was known by the name International Studies Review. Hermann was the first woman president of the International Society of Political Psychology from 1987 to 1988, and served in the same role for the International Studies Association between 1998 and 1999. The Margaret Hermann Award given by the International Studies Association is named for her. She is the author or editor of 11 books and over 100 academic and policy papers.

== Awards & honors ==
- Honorary doctorate by DePauw University
- William Wasserstrom Prize for Graduate Teaching (2017)
- Syracuse University Chancellor's Award for Exceptional Academic Achievement (2004)
