= Edgar S. Furniss =

American economist

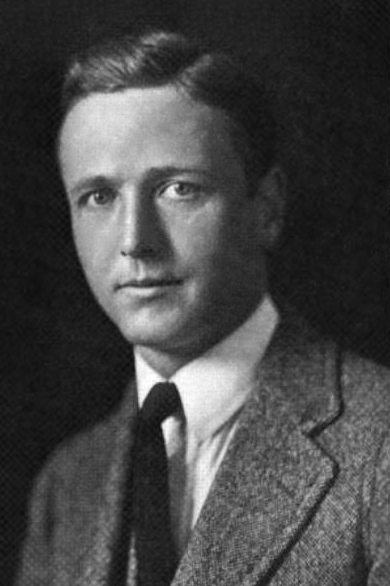
- Born: Edgar Stephenson Furniss Sr. April 15, 1890; Hunter, North Dakota, United States
- Died: July 17, 1972 (aged 82); New Haven, Connecticut, United States
- Occupations: Economist; Educator
- Spouse: Beryl Francis Gates
- Children: Edgar S. Furniss Jr.
- Awards: Wilbur Cross Medal (1966)

Academic background
- Education: Coe College; Yale University
- Thesis: The Position of the Laborer in a System of Nationalism: A Study in the Labor Theories of the Later English Mercantilists (1918)

Academic work
- Discipline: Economics
- Institutions: Yale University

Edgar Stephenson Furniss Sr. (April 15, 1890 — July 17, 1972) was an American economist and educator. Furniss was the Pelatiah Perit Professor of Political and Social Science at Yale University, and from 1937 to 1958, served as Provost.

== Career ==
Originally from Hunter, Furniss graduated from Coe College with a Bachelor of Arts in 1913, and then continued on to Yale University to receive a Doctor of Philosophy in 1918. In that same year, his son, Edgar S. Furniss Jr. was born, who became a noted political scientist.

Furniss began his teaching career at Yale in 1915. He later became the Pelatiah Perit Professor of Political and Social Science there. In 1930, he was named Dean of the Graduate School of Arts and Sciences. Seven years later, Furniss was also appointed Provost. Furniss stepped down as Dean in 1950, but continued on as Provost until 1958.

On June 13, 1966, Furniss became the inaugural winner of the Wilbur Cross Medal. Only months later, his son died after complications from surgery. Furniss himself died in 1972 at Yale New Haven Hospital.

== See also ==
- List of Yale University people
