= Mershon Center for International Security Studies =

Research institute at the Ohio State University

- Type: Research institute
- Established: 1952; 74 years ago
- Founder: Ralph D. Mershon
- Parent institution: Ohio State University
- Director: Mitchell Lerner
- Location: 1010 Derby Hall; Columbus, Ohio 43201; United States
- Website: mershoncenter.osu.edu

The Mershon Center for International Security Studies is a highly regarded research institute at the Ohio State University, devoted to national and international security. The current director is Dr. Mitchell Lerner.

== History ==
The Mershon Center was founded in 1952 upon the death of Ralph D. Mershon, an alumnus of the school, who left funds to the university for the establishment of a research institute dedicated to the fields of international relations and security. Many schools founded similar centers in the aftermath of World War II such as the Arnold A. Saltzman Institute of War and Peace Studies at Columbia University.

The first director of the Mershon Center was Edgar S. Furniss Jr., who was appointed in 1960. However, he would die unexpectedly only six years later. Fellows throughout the years have included Francis Beer, Erika Bourguignon, Ofer Feldman, Azar Gat, Margaret Hermann, David P. Houghton, Kimberly Marten, Robert J. McMahon, Margaret Mills, John Mueller, Mary Ellen O'Connell, Allan Silverman, and Alexander Stephan.

The Mershon Center houses scholars from a variety of fields, including doctoral students, visiting fellows, and permanent faculty affiliates. Its programs include a multi-day national security simulation; a State Department Diplomacy Lab project; the Divided Community dispute resolution program; a number of international peacekeeping programs; a comparative national election project; and numerous conferences, workshop, and speaker programs.

== Directors ==
- Edgar S. Furniss Jr. (1960–1966)
- James A. Robinson (1966–1970)
- Richard C. Snyder (1970–1980)
- Charles F. Hermann (1980–1995)
- Richard Ned Lebow (1996–2000)
- Richard Herrmann (2002–2011)
- J. Craig Jenkins (2011–2015)
- Christopher Gelpi (2018–2022)
- Dorothy Noyes (2022–2026)
- Mitchell Lerner (2026-present)

== Furniss Book Award ==
In 1982, Director Charles F. Hermann initiated a book award in honor of the first director of the center, Edgar S. Furniss Jr. The award is presented annually to a scholar whose "first book makes an exceptional contribution to the study of national and international security."

Notable recipients have included Harry G. Summers Jr. (1982), John Mearsheimer (1983), Barry Posen (1984), Bruce G. Blair (1986), Andrew Krepinevich (1987), Stephen Walt (1988), Aaron Friedberg (1989), Stephen Peter Rosen (1992), Michael E. Brown (1993), James Goldgeier (1995), Lars-Erik Cederman (1998), Robert D. English (2000), Matthew Connelly (2002), Benjamin Valentino (2004), Michael C. Horowitz (2010), and Keren Yarhi-Milo (2014).

== Kruzel Lecture ==
The Center hosts an annual lecture in honor of Joseph J. Kruzel Jr., a political science Professor at OSU, who was in the State Department delegation to the Strategic Arms Limitations Talks in Helsinki and served the Clinton Administration as Deputy Assistant Secretary of Defense for European and NATO policy. Kruzel created the Partnership for Peace program in 1994, and served in Bosnia as the Defense Department special envoy and chief negotiator on the US team working to end the Yugoslav Wars. He was killed in 1995 while on a diplomatic mission, and later received the Presidential Citizens Medal.

Among the many who have delivered the Kruzel Lecture are Rt Hon Rory Stewart, former UK cabinet minister, diplomat, and Member of Parliament for Penrith and the Border; Fiona Hill, Deputy assistant to the president and senior director for European and Russian affairs on the U.S. National Security Council; Chris Hill, the Dean of the Josef Korbel School of International Studies, University of Denver, and former U.S. ambassador to Iraq; Ted Warner III, the Secretary of Defense representative to New START and senior advisor for arms control and strategic stability; and former Secretary of Defense William Perry.

== National Security Simulation ==
The Mershon Center hosts renowned a semi-annual National Security Simulation. The simulation involves 250 participants, from fields including law, policy, politics, military, intelligence, communications, and management, and lasts for 2 days of intense role-playing. Students staff top levels in all three branches of the federal government, state government, local government, the press corps, and a Fortune 500 company in Ohio. It includes two or three major scenarios and a dozen minor ones involving international and domestic security. Former participants have included senators and representatives, intelligence officers, and military leaders, with students serving as their advisors.

== See also ==
- History of Ohio State University
- Timeline of Columbus, Ohio
