= Christopher Gelpi =

American political scientist

- Citizenship: American
- Education: University of Michigan (PhD)
- Occupation: Political scientist
- Employer: Ohio State University

Christopher Gelpi (born 1966) is an American political scientist at Ohio State University. He is currently the Director of the Mershon Center for Conflict Resolution, the Endowed Chair in Peace Studies and Conflict Resolution, and a published author who writes on the sources of international military conflict and American public opinion on foreign policy issues.

== Education ==
Gelpi holds a PhD in political science from the University of Michigan.

== Publications ==
=== Articles ===
- Competency Costs in Foreign Affairs: Presidential Performance in International Conflicts and Domestic Legislative Success, 1953–2001, American Journal of Political Science, December 16, 2014 (co-authored with Joseph M. Grieco)
- Let's Get a Second Opinion: International Institutions and American Public Support for War, International Studies Quarterly, November 6, 2011 (co-authored with Joseph M. Grieco, Jason Reifler, and Peter D. Feaver)
