= Ralph D. Mershon =

American electrical engineer and inventor (1868–1952)

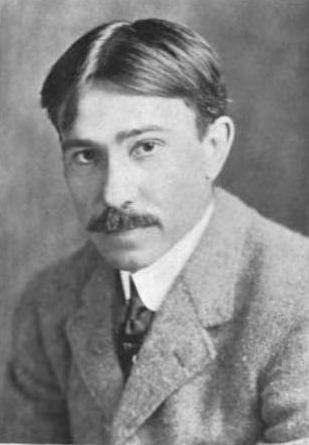
- Mershon in 1916
- Born: Ralph Davenport Mershon; July 14, 1868; Zanesville, Ohio, US
- Died: February 14, 1952 (aged 83); Coconut Grove, Florida, US
- Education: Ohio State University
- Occupations: Electrical engineer, inventor

Ralph Davenport Mershon (July 14, 1868 – February 14, 1952) was an American electrical engineer and inventor. His company Mershon Condensers was a successful manufacturer of electrolytic capacitors for the expanding radio market of the 1920s. He is known for the Mershon Auditorium (1957) and the Mershon Center for International Security Studies at his alma mater Ohio State University that his estate made possible. In 1956 a biography and summary of his work was published by Ohio State University; the following article is a digest of that publication.

== Family ==
Mershon was born in Zanesville, Ohio, on July 14, 1868. His sister Hope Lord Mershon was born in 1875 and lived to 1953, but their other siblings perished in infancy.

His father Ralph Smith Mershon was a watchmaker, having apprenticed in Trenton and Philadelphia. He played the violin and was an inventor, devising a compound regulator for timepieces, and a repeating pistol similar to the Girandoni air rifle. In 1863, he purchased Henry Kruger jewelers in Zanesville, Ohio. Mershon married Mary Elizabeth Jones on November 12, 1863. The clock installed by Ralph Smith Mershon in the tower of Muskingum County Courthouse was still functioning in 1956.

== Career ==
=== Early career and education ===
Unsatisfied by classes at Zanesville High School in 1884, Mershon joined a crew surveying for a railroad. Working under Mr. Bateman, a surveyor, he gained hands-on experience with a transit and level. Bateman would not answer Mershon's questioning, referring him instead to the Handbook of Civil Engineering by John Trautwine. From that point he learned to use reference works. Given that young Mershon had an interest in mechanics, a coworker suggested he study at Ohio State. Returning to Zanesville, Mershon turned to superintendent of schools William D. Lash for examination and certification. Mershon was admitted to Ohio State in the fall of 1886. His skills being evident, in his senior year he served as student assistant. In 1890, he graduated with a degree in mechanical engineering. After graduation he was an assistant instructor in electrical engineering. Working with alternating current machinery, Mershon developed a means of waveform measurement. It is described as an instantaneous potentiometer method, employing a telephone receiver to indicate balance. This work attracted the attention of the Westinghouse Electric Company.

=== Success in electrical power transmission ===
In 1891, Mershon joined the company in East Pittsburgh, Pennsylvania, where he designed transformers for electrical power distribution systems. In 1896, he and Charles F. Scott were sent to Telluride, Colorado, to carry out experiments on high-voltage transmissions. Their experiments went up to 133,000 volts; they observed corona discharge along the transmission lines. The losses were ameliorated with thicker wires and greater separation. To gain experience in the deployment of a power grid, Mershon took a leave of absence from Westinghouse to work with Colorado Electric Power in 1897/8. He returned to Westinghouse, serving for a short time in the New York City office.

In 1900 Ralph Mershon became a consultant in electrical power transmission. He designed and supervised the construction of power systems in various states, Ontario and Quebec. From 1905, he consulted with South African firms taking power from Victoria Falls, and travelled there. From 1912, he consulted on a project at Inawashiro lake in Japan. He helped place visiting Japanese engineers with American manufacturers and power companies so that the necessary expertise could be acquired. Mershon became a Fellow of the American Association for the Advancement of Science on January 2, 1906.

=== Membership of engineering organizations ===
Mershon was a member of the Engineer's Club in New York City. The Engineers' Club Building was erected in 1907. In 1910, he was involved in the formation of an "Inventors' Guild" that included Thomas Edison, Peter Cooper Hewitt, Elmer Sperry, Mihajlo Pupin, Baekeland, and others. These men were concerned with patent law, sometimes critically. Mershon was made a Life Member of the Engineers Club on January 26, 1950.

Mershon was president of AIEE in 1912. He is quoted making the wry observation that such posts went to men whose "chief claim to fame arise from activities in fields other than that of electrical engineering as defined by the Institute's constitution".

== Patents and accomplishments ==
Mershon had many patents for inventions he devised. One of the most celebrated was a compensating voltmeter that was awarded the John Scott Medal by Philadelphia. In 1916 Mershon advocated for the "Ohio Plan" of military preparedness on campuses that is embodied in the ROTC. In 1918, Tufts College awarded him an honorary Doctor of Science.

Mershon became a master of the art of building capacitors, an important element not only of power systems but also in the electronics of radio. From 1911 to 1942, he was granted 55 patents. His Mershon Condensers were featured in the popular Crosley brand radios, and suppressed the 60 cps hum heard without them. In 1930, the Mershon company was bought by Magnavox, and the brand was discontinued. However, the patent-holder continued to defend his interest with lawsuits: Merson v. Robinson (June 30, 1941) and Mershon v. Sprague (April 2, 1936).

== Personal life and legacy ==
Ralph Mershon never married. He died February 14, 1952, aged 83, at his home in Coconut Grove, Florida. His papers are preserved by Ohio State University Archives. In 1956, Ohio State University Press published a two-volume biography by Edith D. Cockins, who was registrar of the University from 1895 to 1944. From the account, she came to know him first when the alumni association was invigorated by his Presidency. The first volume recounts Mershon's life and engineering projects, the second is an edited and annotated collection of his writings. His suggestions for the improvement of the patent system are found on pages 142 and 143 of volume one.
