= List of University of Nottingham people =

A list of people related to the University of Nottingham or to its predecessor, University College, Nottingham.

== Office holders ==
=== Chancellors ===
- John Boot, 2nd Baron Trent (1949 - 1954)
- William Cavendish-Bentinck, 7th Duke of Portland (1954 - 1971)
- Sir Francis Hill (1971 - 1978)
- Sir Gordon Hobday (1978 - 1993)
- Ronald Dearing, Baron Dearing (1993 - 2000)
- Fujia Yang (2000 - 2012)
- Sir Andrew Witty (2013–2017)
- Lola Young, Baroness Young of Hornsey (2020–present)

=== Vice-Chancellors ===
- Bertrand Hallward (1948 - 1965)
- Frederick Dainton, Baron Dainton (1965 - 1970)
- John Butterfield, Baron Butterfield (1971 - 1975)
- Basil Weedon (1976 - 1988)
- Sir Colin Campbell (1988 - 2008)
- Sir David Greenaway (2008 - September 2017)
- Shearer West (October 2017 – 2025)
- Jane Norman (January 2025 - present)

== Notable alumni ==
=== Academia ===
- Bob Boucher – Vice-Chancellor of the University of Sheffield
- Arthur Carty – National Science Advisor to the Prime Minister of Canada
- Sir Bernard Crossland – President of the Institute of Mechanical Engineers
- Paul Dibb – Australian defence intelligence official and Head of the ANU Strategic and Defence Studies Centre
- Louis Essen – physicist
- Charles Bungay Fawcett – geographer
- Pamela Gillies – Vice-Chancellor of Glasgow Caledonian University
- Sir Clive Granger – 2003 Nobel Laureate, Economics
- Gerald Hawkins – Professor of Astronomy, noted for his interest in Stonehenge
- Harriet Hawkins – Professor of Human Geography, noted in the field of geohumanities
- Nigel Healey – Vice-Chancellor of Fiji National University
- Sir Brian Heap – Master of St Edmund's College, Cambridge and former Vice-President of the Royal Society
- Reginald Hugh Hickling – lawyer, colonial civil servant, law academic and author
- John Pilkington Hudson – the university's first Professor of Horticulture
- Jack Lewis, Baron Lewis of Newnham – chemist
- Scot McKnight – Professor of Religious Studies at North Park University, recognised for his scholarship on the New Testament, early Christianity, and the historical Jesus
- Amina Memon – social and cognitive psychologist, academic, and author
- Victor Mundella — Physicist; Professor of Physics, Northern Polytechnic Institute; Principal of Sunderland Technical College
- Sir Keith O'Nions – geologist, Director-General UK Research Councils
- Brian Norton – solar energy technologist, President, Dublin Institute of Technology
- Austin Quigley – Dean, Columbia College
- Nigel Shadbolt – Principal of Jesus College, Oxford and Chairman of the Open Data Institute
- Roger Tomlinson – "father of Geographic information system"
- Carl Trueman – author, Presbyterian theologian, and Professor of Historical Theology and Church History, Westminster Theological Seminary.
- Graham Twelftree – Distinguished Professor of New Testament, Regent University School of Divinity, renowned for his contribution to the Third Quest for the Historical Jesus and his extensive work on miracles in the New Testament
- Matthew P. Walker – Professor of Neuroscience and Psychology at the University of California, Berkeley, and Founder and Director of the Center for Human Sleep Science
- Silke Weinfurtner – Physicist and quantum gravity researcher
- Said Al Zebda – president of the University College of Applied Sciences in Palestine

=== Arts and media ===
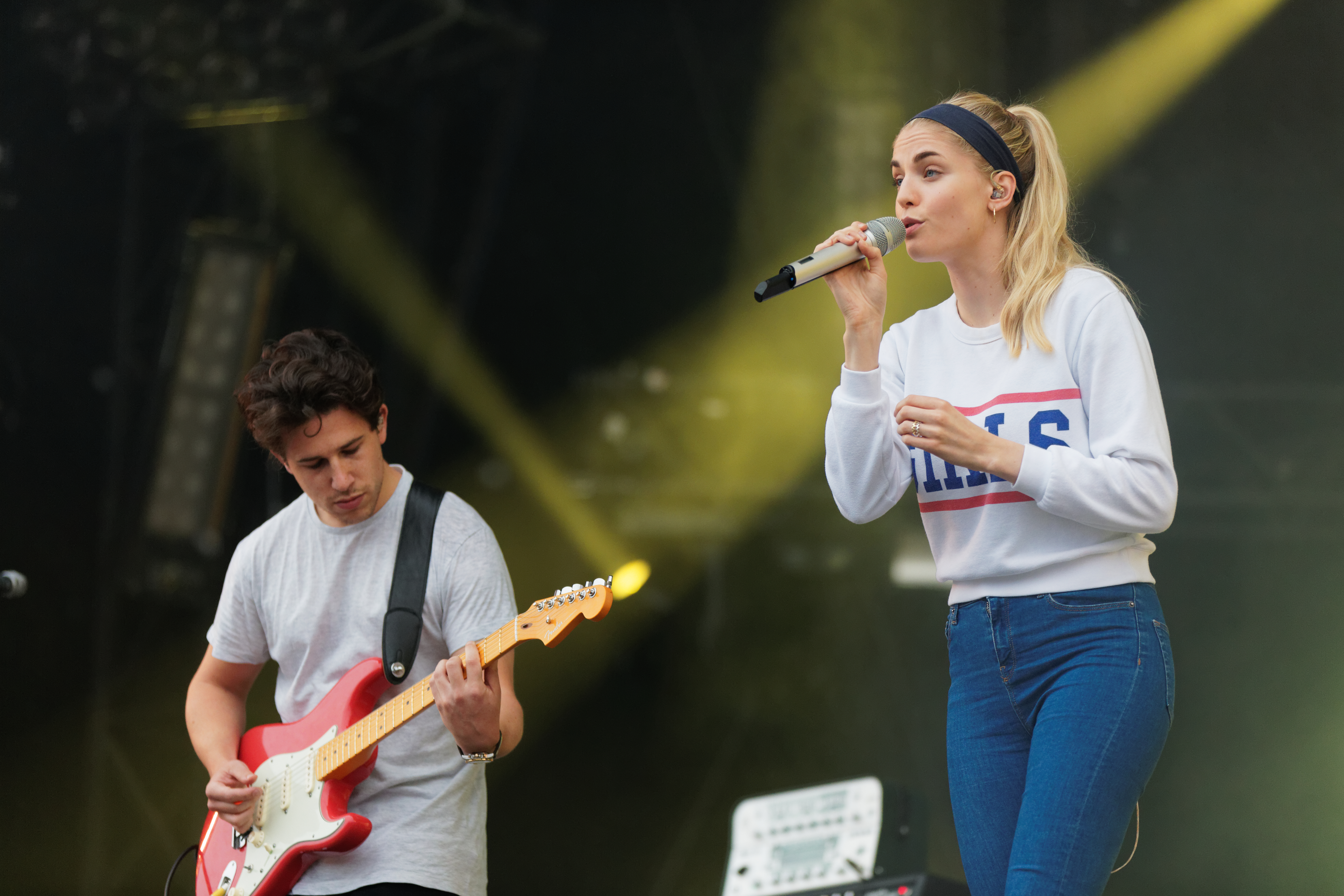
London Grammar

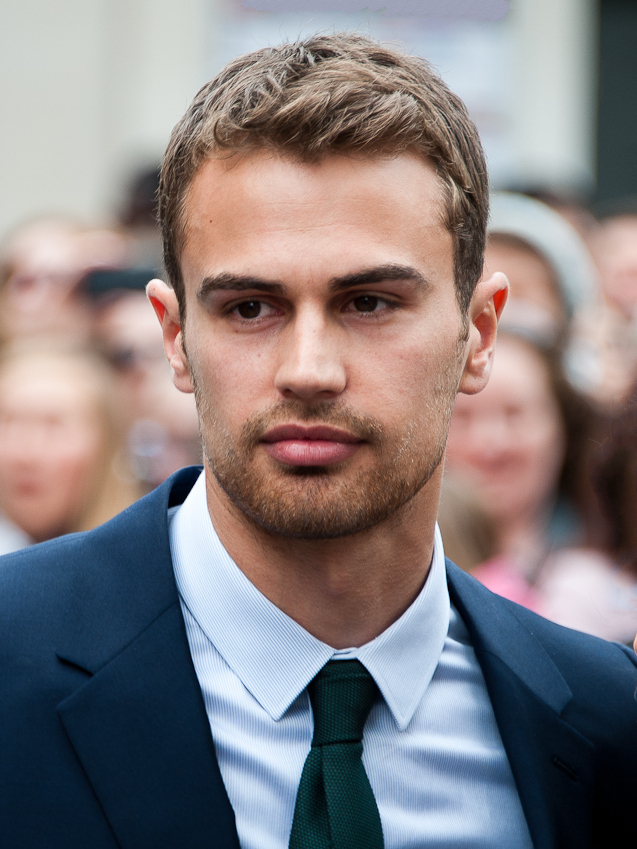
Theo James

- Sue Arrowsmith – artist
- Matthew Bannister – BBC broadcaster and administrator
- Olav Bjortomt – quiz setter for The Times and notable contestant
- Robert Brustein – Harvard English Professor, founder of Yale University repertory theatre and the American Repertory theatre
- Don Broco -– British rock group
- Liz Carr – comedian and disabled rights activist
- Michael Coren – author and broadcaster
- Ian Dickson – ″judge″ of Australian Idol
- Mike Dilger – nature presenter on The One Show
- Elizabeth Dulau - actress
- Elliott Gotkine – BBC South America correspondent
- Haydn Gwynne – actress
- London Grammar – British pop group
- James T. Harris – American radio personality
- Chris Hawkins – radio personality
- Charlie Ireland – agronomist and land agent featured (as himself) on the series Clarkson's Farm
- Oliver James – psychologist and TV presenter
- Theo James – actor
- Colin Matthews – composer
- David Matthews – composer
- James Moir – former controller of BBC Radio 2
- Natalie Pinkham - Sky Sports F1 presenter
- Clarissa Punipun - Indonesian cosplayer, gamer, and physiognomist
- Jeff Randall – Daily Telegraph editor-at-large and Sky television presenter
- Katie Rowley Jones – actress
- Frances Ryan – journalist and author
- Myles Smith - singer
- Clive Tyldesley – lead football commentator for ITV
- Ruth Wilson – actress
- Helen Willetts – BBC weather presenter
- Tracie Young – pop singer

=== Business ===
- Jonathan Browning – Chairman, Vauxhall Motors
- Clive Hollick, Baron Hollick – former owner of United News
- Steve Holliday – CEO, National Grid plc
- Philip Johnston - Co-Founder and CEO of Starcloud
- Hosein Khajeh-Hosseiny – founder OpenX Innovations
- Tim Martin – Chairman of Wetherspoons
- Judith McHale – President and CEO, Discovery Communications
- Kike Oniwinde – founder of BYP Network
- Sir Robert Phillis – Chief Executive, Guardian Media Group
- William Henry Revis - a lace and hosiery manufacturer and major benefactor of Nottingham University College.
- John Rishton – CEO, Royal Ahold and Rolls-Royce
- John Timpson – Chairman, Timpson
- Andrew Witty – CEO, GlaxoSmithKline
- Perseus Mlambo – founder of ChitChat

=== Government and politics ===
==== United Kingdom ====
- Tim Aker – UK Independence Party
- Andrew Bridgen – Conservative
- Jeremy Browne – Liberal Democrat, Minister of State at the Foreign Office
- Neil Carmichael – Conservative
- Jacob Collier - Labour MP
- David Drew - Labour
- Michael Dugher – Labour, permanent private secretary
- Parmjit Dhanda – Former Labour MP
- Tom Ellis – former Labour MP, before defecting to Social Democratic Party
- Charlie Elphicke – Conservative
- John Henry Hayes – Conservative, Minister of State for Transport
- Jimmy Hood – Labour
- Kelvin Hopkins – Labour
- Tony Lloyd – Labour, former Minister of State at the Foreign Office
- Stephen Mosley – Conservative
- Meg Munn – Labour, former Minister for Women and Equality
- John Pugh – Liberal Democrat
- Merlyn Rees – former Labour MP and Home secretary
- Angela Smith – Labour
- Antoinette Sandbach - Conservative
- Dari Taylor – former Labour MP
- Paddy Tipping – former Labour MP
- Nadia Whittome – Labour MP
- Rebecca Paul – Conservative MP

==== International politics ====
- Peter Ala Adjetey – Speaker of the Parliament of Ghana
- Isaac Kobina Abban – 9th Chief Justice of the Supreme Court of Ghana
- Philip Edward Archer – 8th Chief Justice of the Supreme Court of Ghana
- Zainab Bangura – Sierra Leone Foreign Minister, human rights campaigner, Presidential Candidate
- Helena Dalli - European Commissioner for Equality, 2019 - 2024
- Lateefa Al Gaood – first female Member of the Council of Representatives of Bahrain
- Abdoulie Janneh - United Nations Executive Secretary of the Economic Commission for Africa (ECA)
- Alpha Kanu - Sierra Leonean minister of Presidential and Public Affairs
- Leon Lillie - US member of the Minnesota House of Representatives
- Judith McHale – US Under Secretary of State for Public Diplomacy and Public Affairs
- Tun Dato Seri Haji Hamdan Bin Sheik Tahir – former Governor of Penang, Malaysia
- Tunku Tan-Sri Imran ibni Tuanku Jaafar – former Malaysian ambassador and Sultan of Negeri Sembilan
- Najib Razak - former Prime Minister of Malaysia
- Tengku Ahmad Rithauddeen Ismail – former Malaysian Minister of Defense, former Malaysian Minister of Foreign Affairs
- Mikhail Svetov – Russian politician, one of the main ideologists and popularizers of libertarianism in Russia
- Stuart Young, 8th Prime Minister of Trinidad and Tobago
- Riza Yunos – Bruneian politician, Deputy Minister at the Prime Minister's Office

==== Royalty ====
- Sultan Tuanku Ja'afar – tenth King of Malaysia, Yang Dipertuan Besar of Negeri Sembilan
- Sultan Raja Azlan Shah – ninth King of Malaysia, 34th Sultan of Perak
- Zara Salim Davidson – wife of the Raja Muda (Crown Prince) of Perak and grandniece of the first Prime Minister of Malaysia, Tunku Abdul Rahman
- Tuanku Bahiyah – fifth Raja Permaisuri Agong (Queen) of Malaysia
- Iman Afzan – daughter of the 16th King of Malaysia

==== Government ====
- Akierra Missick – Deputy Premier of the Turks and Caicos Islands
- Najib Razak – former prime minister of Malaysia (2009–2018)
- Sir John Sawers – former Permanent Representative of the United Kingdom to the United Nations who later went on before retiring to become Chief of the Secret Intelligence Service (MI6)
- Sir Richard Tilt – Social Fund Commissioner, former Director General HM Prison Service
- Sir Mike Tomlinson – Chief Inspector of Schools

=== Military ===
- Air Vice Marshal Johnnie Johnson – pilot, Second World War flying ace
- General Aamir Raza - Commander, National Strategic Command, Pakistan

=== Natural sciences, engineering and medicine ===
==== Engineering ====
- Reginald Coates – civil engineer and former President of the Institution of Civil Engineers
- Frank Halford – aircraft engine designer
- Peter Hansford – civil engineer and (from November 2012) UK government's chief construction adviser
- Onyeche Tifase – electrical engineer and MD/CEO of Siemens Nigeria

==== Natural sciences ====
- Michael Creeth – Biochemist who confirmed the existence of hydrogen bonds between the purine and pyrimidine bases of DNA
- David Dolphin – Chemist and lead creator of Visudyne
- Julie E. Gray – Plant molecular biologist
- Anil Kakodkar – Nuclear scientist and mechanical engineer
- Ian Wilmut – embryologist who managed the team who cloned Dolly the sheep

==== Medicine ====
- Qanta Ahmed – physician specializing in sleep disorders, and author, women's rights activist, journalist, and public commentator
- Monica Lakhanpaul - medical doctor, public health expert, and academic

=== Religion ===
- David Hope, Baron Hope of Thornes – former Lord Archbishop of York
- Alan Jones – former Dean of the Episcopal Grace Cathedral, San Francisco
- Henry Luke Orombi – former Archbishop of the church of Uganda

=== Other ===
- Kweku Adoboli – former UBS employee known for his role in the 2011 UBS rogue trader scandal
- Richard Best, Baron Best – Director, Joseph Rowntree Foundation
- Sue Biggs – Director General of the Royal Horticultural Society
- Mary Marsh – Director of the NSPCC
- John Monks – former General Secretary of the Trades Union Congress
- Kemebradikumo Pondei – acting managing director of Niger Delta Development Commission
- Adam Powell – game designer and co-founder of Neopets
- Donna Powell – game designer and co-founder of Neopets
- Dame Helen Reeves – Chief Executive of Victim Support
- David Sharp – mountaineer
- Sir Nigel Sweeney – High Court Judge
- Levison Wood – explorer
- Greville Wynne – British spy, imprisoned by the KGB

=== Sport ===
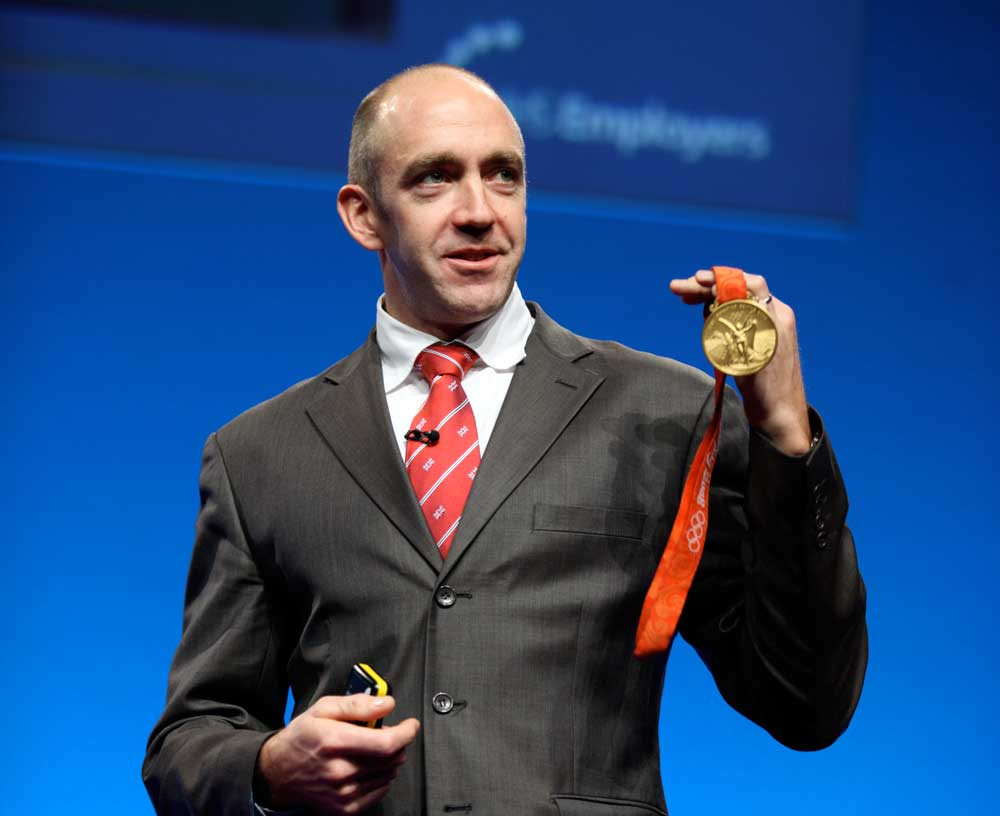
Tim Brabants

- Tim Baillie – London 2012 Canoe Slalom (C2) Olympic gold medallist
- Chris Bartley – London 2012 Men's Four Rowing Olympic silver medallist
- Tim Brabants – three-time Olympic medallist in canoeing
- Kristan Bromley – Skeleton World Cup winner 2003/2004
- Rob Carmichael – tallest professional rugby union player in the world, playing for Edinburgh Rugby
- Eva Carneiro – British physician, Chelsea F.C. Team Doctor (2009-2015)
- Melissa-Jane Daniel – 5 world records in archery
- David Florence – Beijing 2008 Canoe Slalom(C1) and London 2012 Canoe Slalom (C2) Olympic Silver medallist
- Sir Denis Follows – General Secretary, The Football Association; Chairman, British Olympic Association
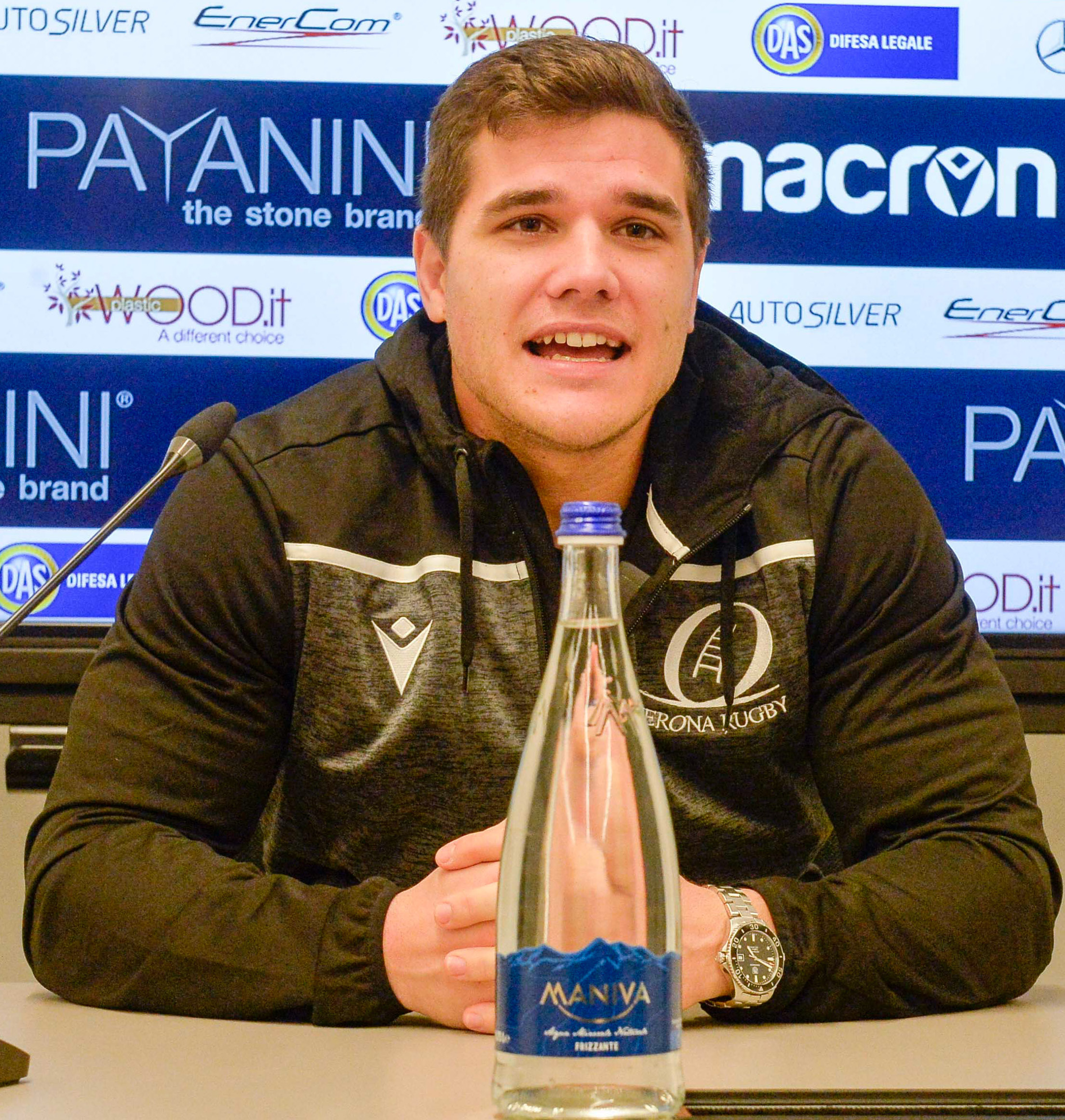
- Gino Lupini
  Michael Gill – cyclist riding for UCI Continental team Saint Piran
- Gino Lupini – former professional and international rugby player
- David Mercer – sports broadcaster
- Brian Moore – England rugby union representative footballer and commentator
- Deryck Murray – former Trinidad and Tobago and West Indies wicket-keeper
- Ayo Oyelola – National Football League Safety
- William Henry Revis – scored the first goal for the Nottingham Reds, the UK's oldest football league team.
- Lynn Simpson – former World Individual and World Series Canoe Slalom Champion
- Matt Smith – Leicester Tigers rugby player
- Etienne Stott – London 2012 Canoe Slalom (C2) Olympic gold medallist
- Campbell Walsh – Athens 2004 Canoe Slalom (K1) Olympic silver medallist; Canoe Slalom World Cup Champion 2004
- Keith Wyness – former Chief Executive, Everton FC
- Deng Yaping – four times Olympic table tennis champion, voted Chinese female athlete of the century

=== Writers and literature ===
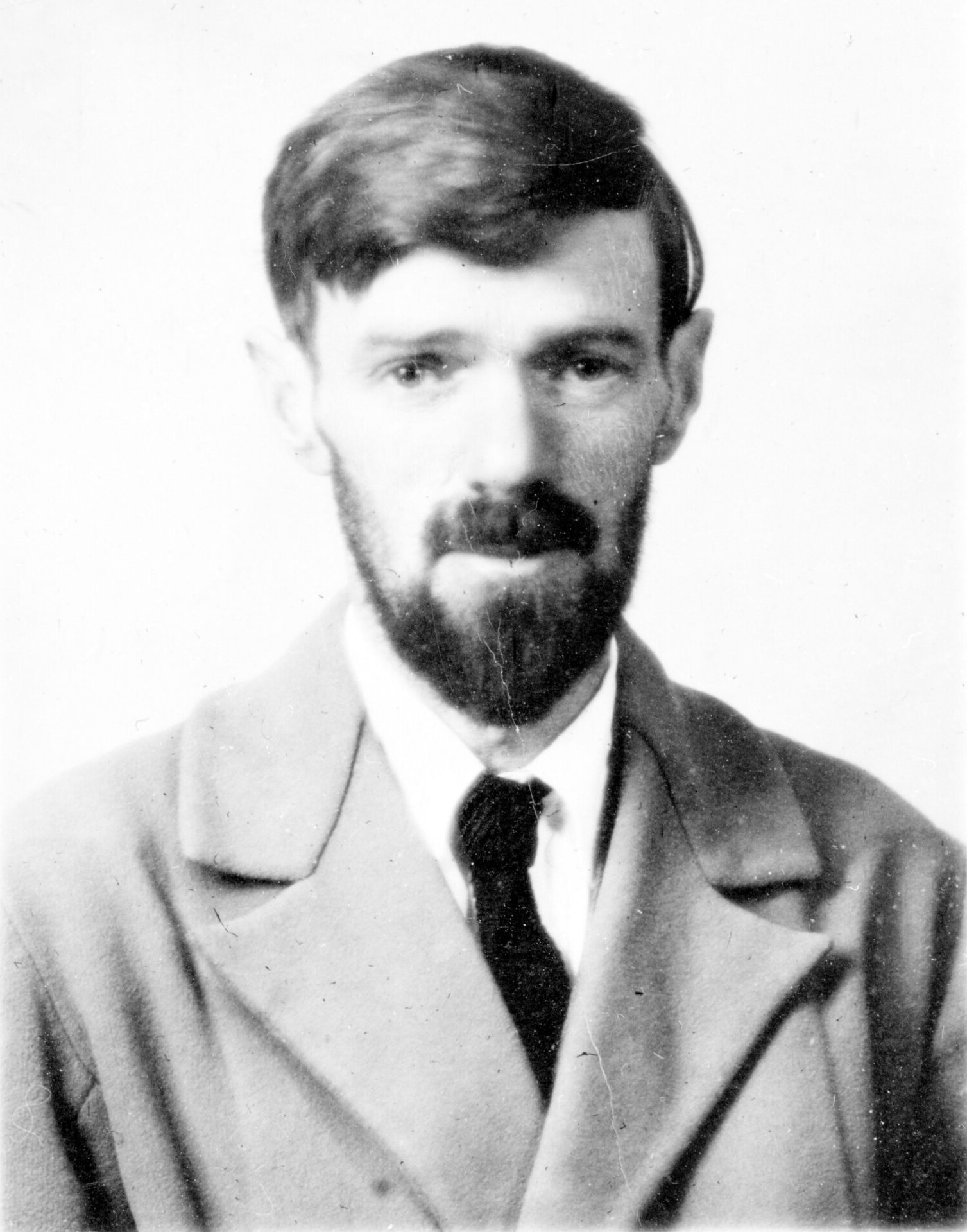
D.H. Lawrence

- Meena Alexander – writer and poet
- Christopher Bigsby – novelist and literary critic
- Peter Boardman – mountaineer and writer
- Michael Bracewell – novelist
- Idris Davies – poet
- Nirpal Singh Dhaliwal – novelist
- Jonathan Emmett – children's author
- John Harvey – crime writer
- Michael Hirst – screenwriter, Elizabeth
- Bert Keizer – author of Dancing with Mister D: Notes on Life and Death
- D.H. Lawrence – novelist
- Stanley Middleton – novelist, winner of the Booker Prize
- Blake Morrison – novelist, poet, critic and journalist
- Michael Scammell – biographer, translator, Professor of Writing at Columbia University
- Rajesh Talwar – human rights lawyer, writer

== Notable academics ==
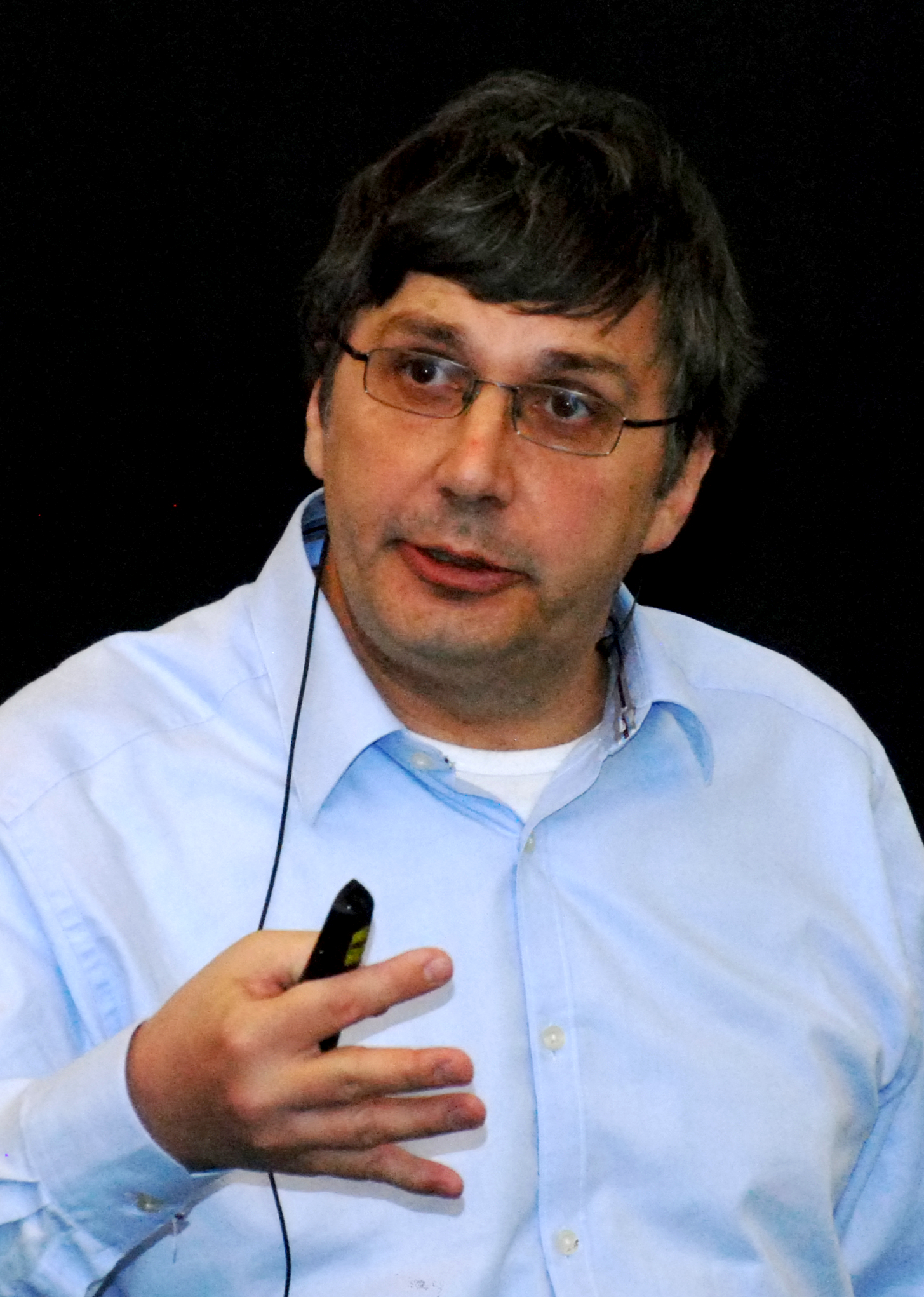
Andre Geim – Nobel Prize–winning physicist

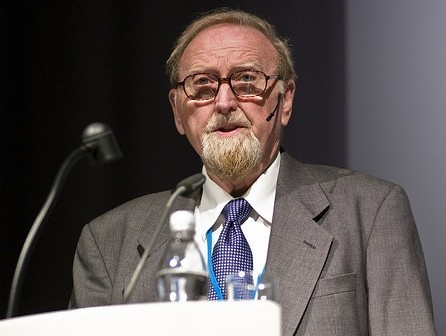
Sir Clive Granger, economist awarded the 2003 Nobel Memorial Prize in Economic Sciences

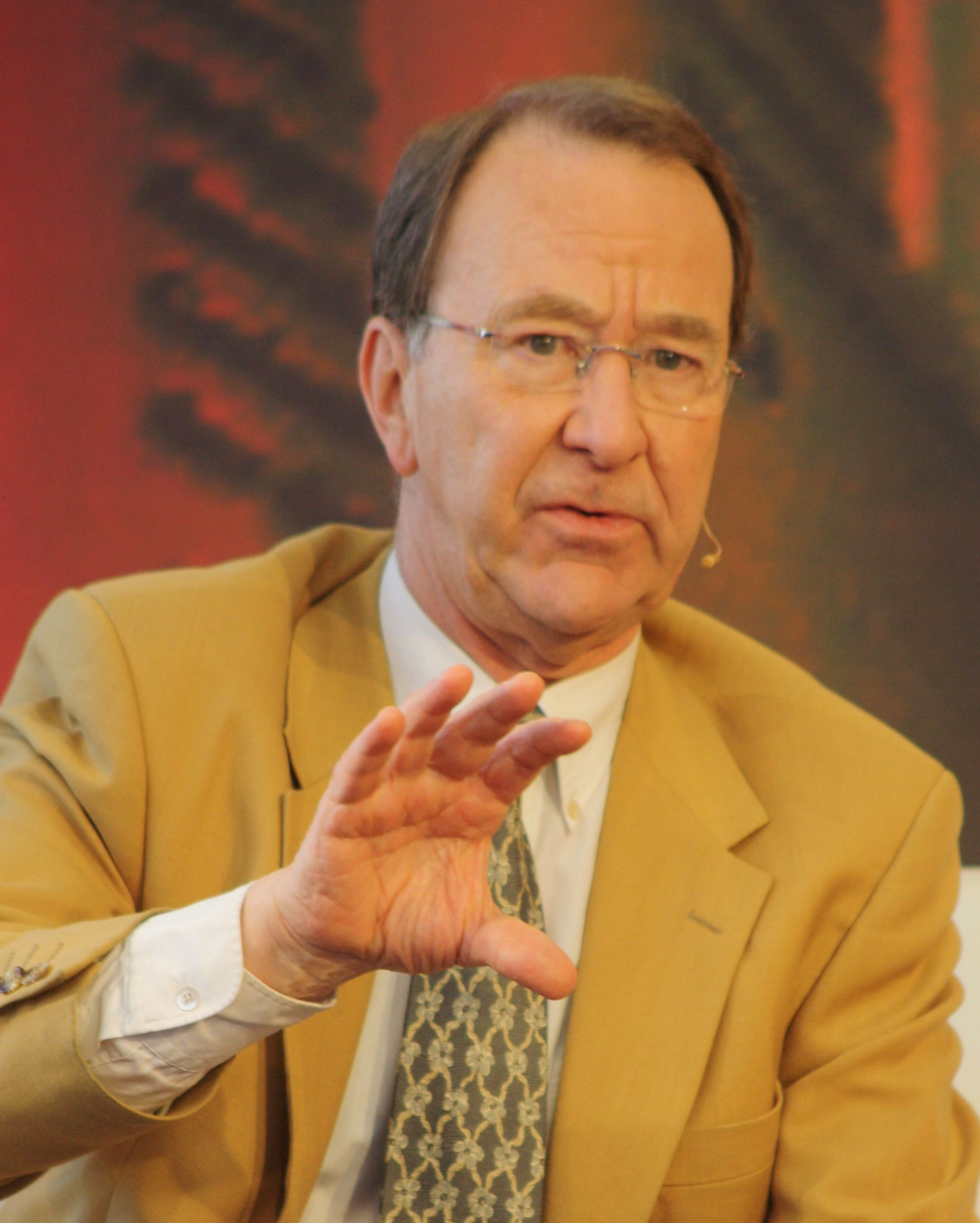
Sir Ian Kershaw, historian

- Gwen Alston - aerodynamicist and educationalist
- Viacheslav Belavkin – mathematician, pioneer of quantum probability
- Wilfrid Butt – biochemist and endocrinologist
- Kenneth Cameron - toponymist of English place-names
- George Carey – Archbishop of Canterbury
- George Checkley – modernist architect
- Bryan Campbell Clarke – pioneering geneticist, particularly noted for his work on apostatic selection, and work with snails
- Stephen Daniels – cultural geographer
- Robert Edgeworth-Johnstone - first Lady Trent professor of chemical engineering
- Esther Eidinow – ancient historian
- Ivan Fesenko – mathematician
- Sir John Ambrose Fleming – pioneer of electronics
- Hugh Gaitskell – Chancellor of the Exchequer, Leader of the Opposition 1955-1963
- Andre Geim – Nobel Prize–winning physicist
- Clive Granger – Nobel Memorial Prize-winning economist
- David Greenaway – economist and Vice Chancellor (2008–2017)
- Don Grierson – geneticist
- George Garfield Hall – mathematician
- F. B. Hinsley - founder of the School of Mining Engineering
- Susan Howson – first female winner of the Adams Prize (for mathematics)
- Robin Lyth Hudson – mathematician, pioneer of quantum probability
- Luce Irigaray
- Sir Ian Kershaw – historian, one of the world's leading experts on Adolf Hitler and the Third Reich
- Graham Kendall - Professor of Computer Science and the Provost and CEO of University of Nottingham Malaysia Campus
- Sir Michael Lyons – Chairman, BBC Trust
- Sir Peter Mansfield – physicist who was awarded the 2003 Nobel Prize in Physiology or Medicine
- David H.H. Metcalfe – President, Royal College of General Practitioners
- Tom Paulin – poet and literary critic
- Monica Partridge - first woman professor at Nottingham University
- Ivy Pinchbeck - economic historian
- Lewis Thorpe – translator of Medieval works; Professor of French
- Sir Martyn Poliakoff – chemist
- Prof. John Rich - emeritus professor in the department of Classics
- Sir John Cyril Smith – lawyer
- Vivian de Sola Pinto – poet and literary critic
- W. J. H. Sprott – Professor of Philosophy
- John Webster – mycologist
- Vernon White – formerly special lecturer in theology, now principal of STETS and Canon of Winchester
- Richard G. Wilkinson – public health
- Robert Wood - special professor 1998-2005, psychologist and writer
- Xu Zhihong – President, Peking University
