= Hinsley =

Hinsley is a surname of English origin. Notable people with that name include:

- Arthur Hinsley (1865–1943), English Catholic prelate
- David Hinsley, former member of the Canadian band Faber Drive
- F. B. Hinsley (1900–1988), English mining engineer
- George Hinsley (1914–1989), English footballer
- Harry Hinsley (1918–1998), English historian and cryptanalyst
- Harvey Hinsley (born 1948), member of the band Hot Chocolate
- Jerry Hinsley (born 1945), American baseball player

== See also ==
- Newman Catholic College (formerly Cardinal Hinsley Maths and Computing College), an all-boys Catholic school in the London Borough of Brent
