= Vernon White =

Vernon White may refer to:

- Vernon White (fighter), mixed martial artist
- Vernon White (politician)
- Vernon White (theologian), British theologian
