= University of Nottingham Malaysia =

Malaysian franchise of the University of Nottingham

- Universiti Nottingham Malaysia (Malay)
- Former name: University of Nottingham Malaysia Campus (UNMC)
- Motto: Latin: Sapientia urbs conditur
- Motto in English: A City is Built on Wisdom
- Type: Private
- Established: 2000
- Affiliations: Universitas 21, Sutton 13. ACU, EUA. Universities UK
- Chairman: Admiral Tan Sri Dato' Setia Mohd Anwar Bin Hj Mohd Nor (Retired)
- Chancellor: Baroness Young of Hornsey OBE
- Vice-Chancellor: Professor Shearer West
- Provost: Professor David FitzPatrick Provost and CEO
- Students: 4,300
- Undergraduates: 4,016
- Postgraduates: 955
- Doctoral students: 232
- Location: Semenyih, Selangor, Malaysia; 2.945°N 101.874°E
- Campus: 48-hectare
Colours
The University: Notts Blue
House of Arts
House of Social Science
House of Medicine
House of Engineering
House of Divinity
House of Science
- Nickname: "Notts"
- Website: nottingham.edu.my

The University of Nottingham Malaysia is a private university branch campus of the University of Nottingham. The university is situated in Semenyih, Selangor, Malaysia. The university is rated ‘Competitive’ in the SETARA 2025 rating system by the Ministry of Higher Education (MoHE). Based on the QS World University Rankings 2026, the university is ranked 97th globally.

The campus is run as a company called The University of Nottingham Malaysia Sdn Bhd (473520-K) with the provost being dual hatted as the CEO. The majority shareholder is Boustead Holdings.

The Malaysia campus was the first campus of a British university in Malaysia and one of the first to open outside Britain thus earning the distinction of the Queen's Awards for Enterprise 2001 and the Queen's Award for Industry (International Trade) 2006.

The University of Nottingham's other overseas campus is located in Ningbo, China.

== History ==
Following an invitation from the Ministry of education to establish an overseas campus, a partnership between Boustead Holdings Berhad, YTL Corporation Berhad and the University of Nottingham was formally announced in 1998.

This development was the first ever branch campus of a British University established outside of the UK.

The University of Nottingham welcomed its first 89 students in September 2000 in Kuala Lumpur. In 2005, the university relocated to 48-hectare (0.48 km^{2}) campus in Semenyih, in the valley of Broga Hill. In 2006, the campus reopened a Kuala Lumpur branch in Chulan Tower on Jalan Conlay to teach MBA students.

== Campus ==
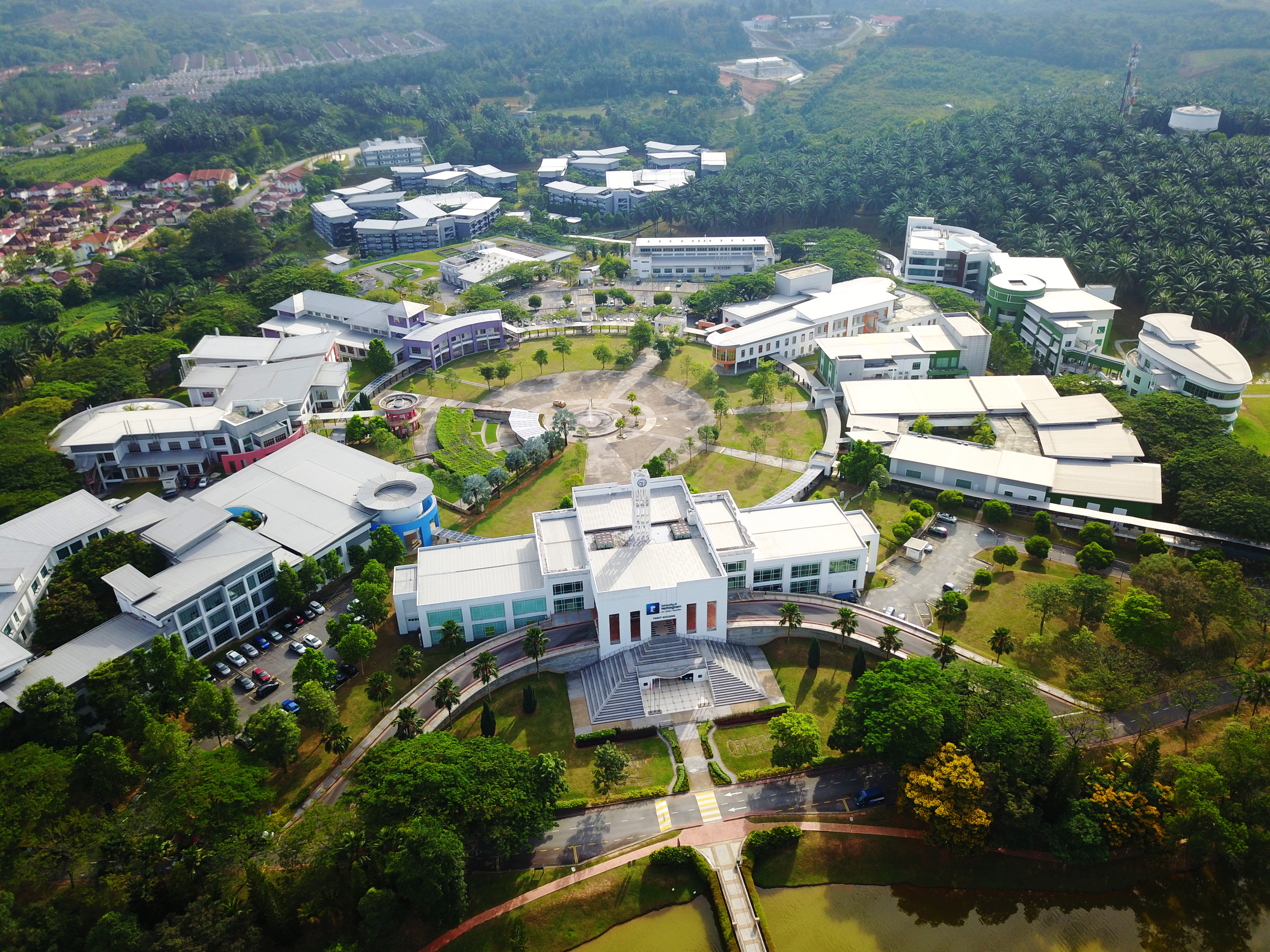
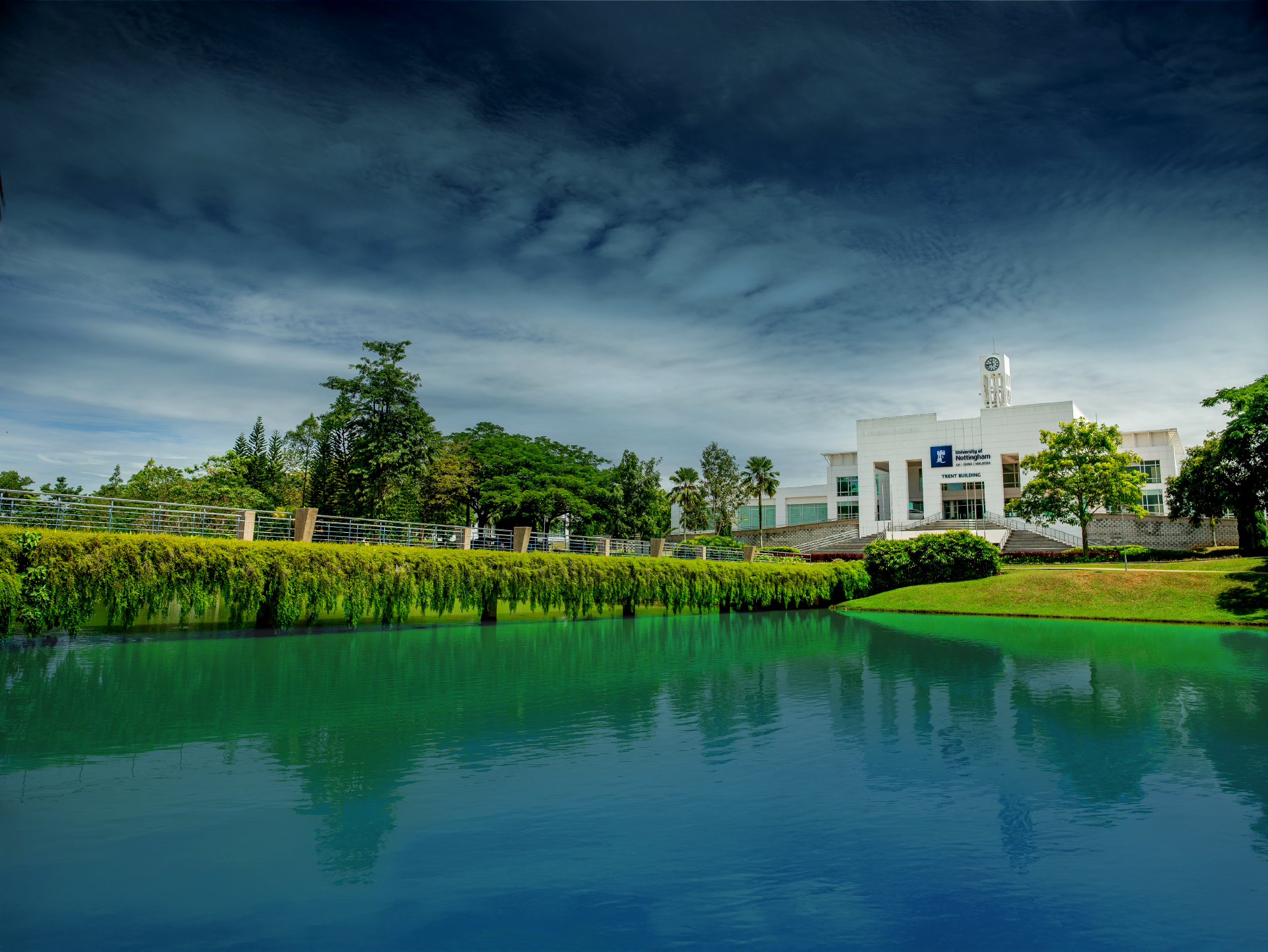

=== Semenyih campus ===
The Malaysia campus is primarily based at a 48-hectare (0.48 km^{2}) plot situated in Semenyih, Selangor. It was voted one of the 9 most beautiful university campuses in Malaysia by Tatler Asia.

=== Future Students Centre ===
In 2023, UNM unveiled a one-stop hub called Future Students Centre (FSC) located at Menara Axis in Petaling Jaya. The centre offers a spacious and convenient location for programme counselling. It also has an accommodation showroom and a campus-scale model, which allows students and parents to understand the UNM campus better.

== Academic profile ==
Despite being a branch campus of the University of Nottingham, students are not necessarily taught with similar course materials and generally do not sit the same exam papers as those in the UK, but are still under the jurisdiction of the Quality Assurance Agency for Higher Education (QAA). Upon completing a degree at the Malaysia campus, students are awarded a University of Nottingham degree certificate at a convocation held locally which is indistinguishable from the certificates awarded at the Nottingham campus. The degrees that are awarded are accredited by international professional bodies such as the Association of MBAs and the UK Engineering Council.

The Engineering Degree courses are accredited by the Board of Engineering Malaysia (BEM) and the Malaysian Qualifications Agency (MQA).

=== Research ===
The university was given a five-star rating in the Malaysia Research Assessment (MyRA) for research excellence in 2020. The only foreign university in Malaysia to be awarded two consecutive MyRAs.

Comprising 280 academic staff, the university's research focuses on future food Malaysia and developing sustainable societies, nanotechnology, inclusion in the workplace, data analytics and artificial intelligence, among others.

Some of the leading organisations that UNM collaborates with in research include Merck Sharpe & Dohme, Sime Darby Foundation, WWF, YTI, Petronas Research and Cancer Research Malaysia.

Apart from the taught undergraduate and postgraduate programmes, the university conducts projects for research-based postgraduate studies. There are more than 20 research programmes being carried out at the Malaysia Campus.

==== Biotechnology Research Centre ====
The Biotechnology Research Centre is a 986-square-metre (10,610 sq ft) research centre specialising in the applied research of biotechnology products, specifically palm oil crop. The building cost RM3.5M, excluding internal fittings and scientific equipment. Inside the main research building there are two labs, one for the teaching of UNMC biotechnology students and the other for research.

The research centre is operated as a joint collaboration with Applied Agricultural Resources Sdn. Bhd (AAR), a start-up company.

=== Partnerships ===
UNM has academic and research collaborations with CNN Academy in Abu Dhabi to provide postgraduate students with journalism education and training.

UNM also partnered with the National Tech Association of Malaysia (PIKOM) since 2020 focusing on talent development, education and training placements and also driving innovation through research and development.

== Student life ==
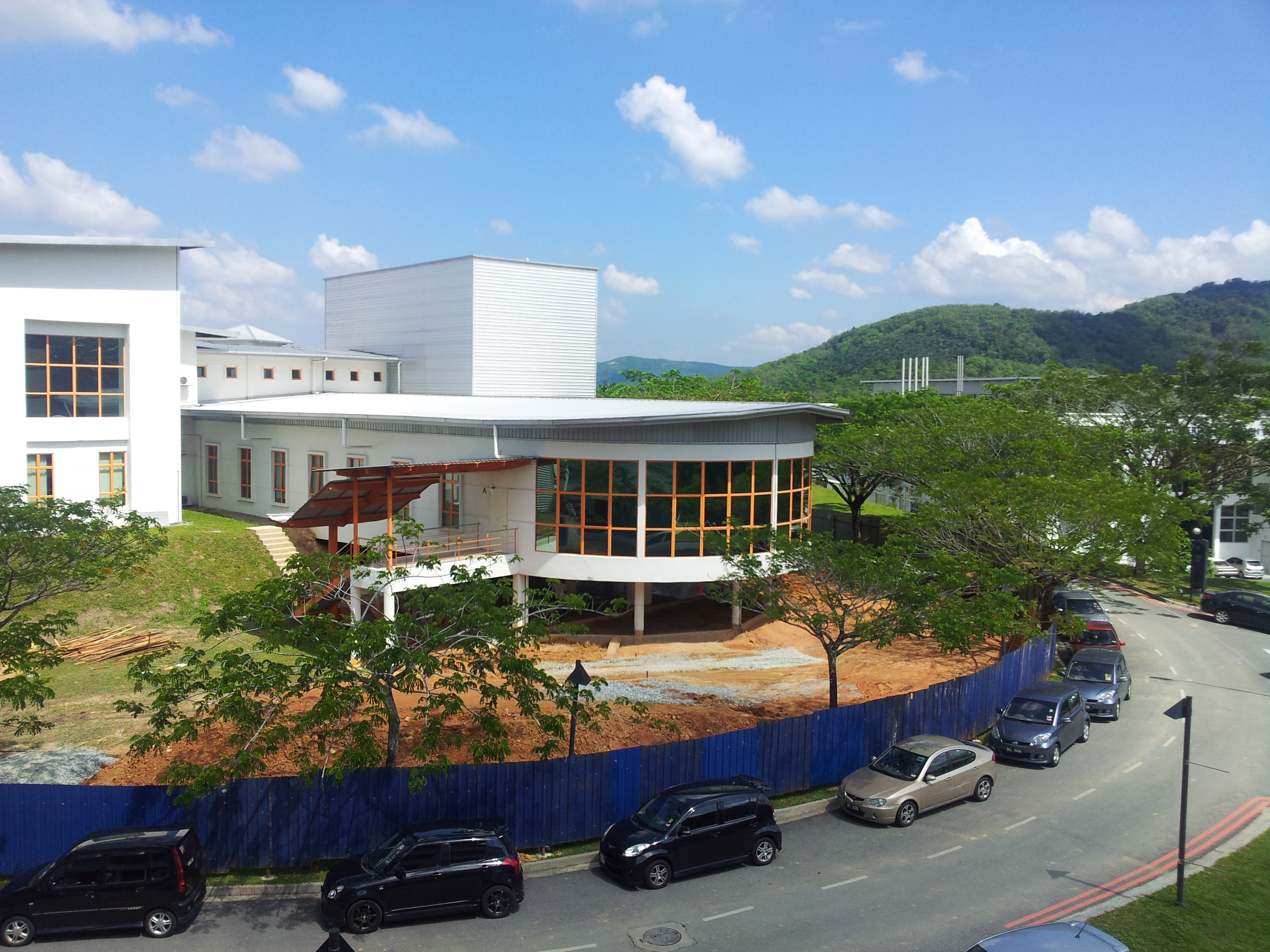
Block E

=== Mobility programme ===
As part of Nottingham's advantage scheme, students may be exchanged to other campuses. In the words of Vincenzo Raimo, director of Nottingham's International Office “Students can continue studying exactly the same modules available at Nottingham in the UK but overseas instead — experience the excitement of Asia but within the familiar academic setting of Nottingham University, ... Transfers are open to anyone getting good grades and whose degree subject is among those taught overseas. Air fares may not be cheap, but the cost of living is — and anyone spending the full year at a branch pays just half the UK tuition fee. "

Besides exchanging to the UK campus or the China campus, students may also take part in Universitas 21 mobility programme in which students may also be exchanged with universities partner to Universitas 21 in Australia, France, Germany, the Netherlands, United States, United Kingdom, Italy, Denmark, Canada, Mexico, Chile, Japan, China, and South Korea.

These exchanges are not guaranteed but subject to agreement by the exchange partners at the time.

University of Nottingham Malaysia Aerial View

== Notable alumni ==
- Ben Hunte – British investigative journalist and news anchor at CNN.

== See also ==
- List of University of Nottingham people
- University of Nottingham Ningbo, China
