= Revis (disambiguation) =

Revis is an American post-grunge band. Revis may also refer to:

- Revis (surname)
- Revis Hill Prairie, natural area in Mason County, Illinois, U.S.
- Darrelle Revis, former American football cornerback in the NFL
