= Revis (surname) =

Revis is a surname. Notable people with the surname include:

- Beth Revis (born 1981), American author of fantasy and science fiction
- Boudewijn Revis (born 1974), Dutch politician
- Darrelle Revis (born 1985), American football player
- Eric Revis (born 1967), American jazz bassist and composer
- Matthew Revis (born 2001), English cricketer
- Mike Revis, American politician
- William Henry Revis (1849–1923), British lace and hosiery manufacturer
