= Ben Hunte =

British reporter (born 1991)

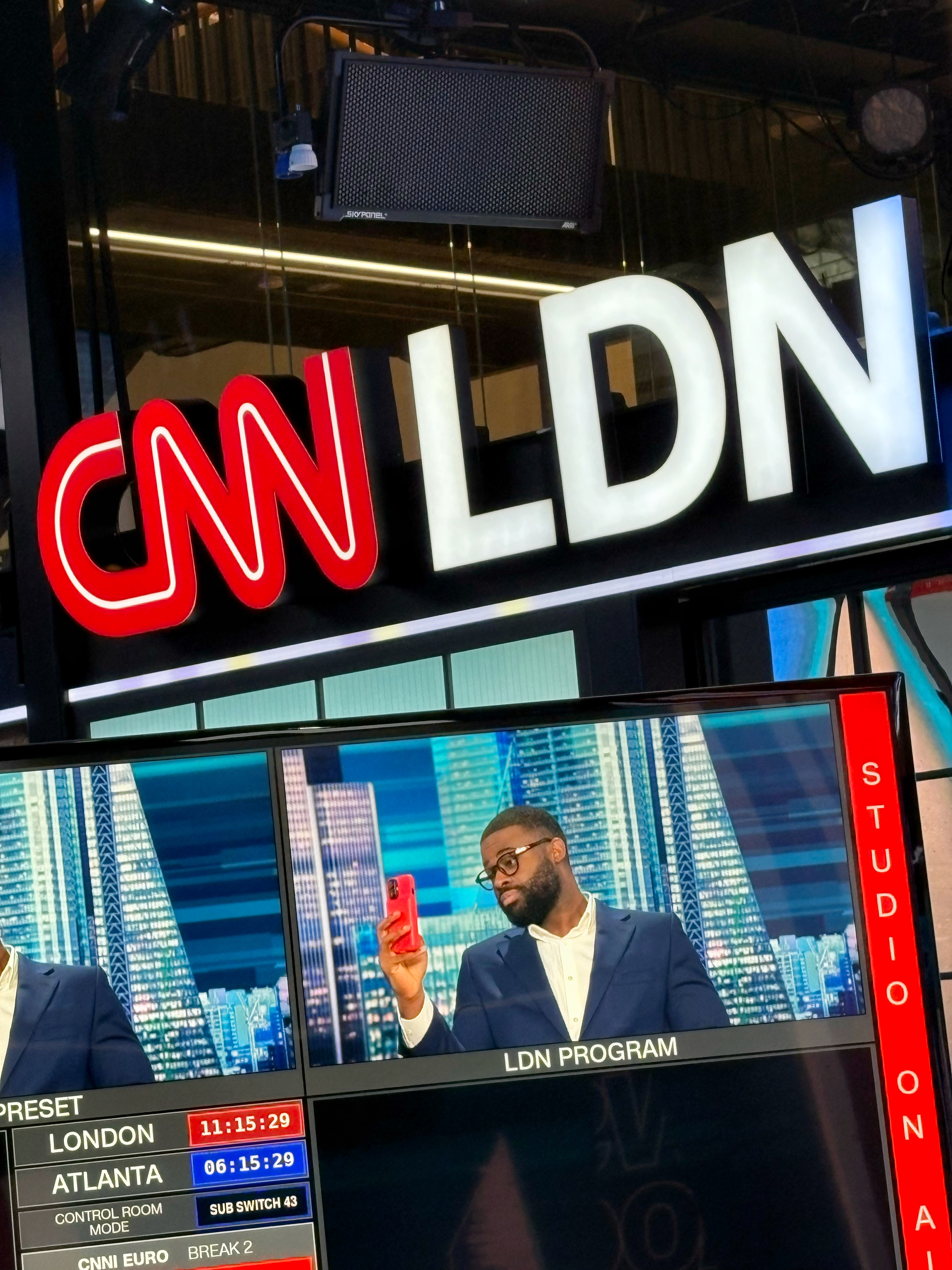
- CNN Anchor Ben Hunte in 2025
- Born: 22 October 1992 (age 33)
- Education: University of Nottingham Malaysia Campus (BSc); City, University of London (MA)
- Occupations: Anchor and Correspondent
- Website: benhunte.com

Ben Hunte (born 22 October 1992) is a British journalist, news presenter and correspondent at CNN. He previously worked for Vice News as a global correspondent and for the BBC as the broadcaster's first LGBT correspondent and a West Africa correspondent.

In May 2022, Hunte was listed on the Forbes 30 Under 30 list.

== Early life and education ==
Hunte was born in London to Caribbean parents. He studied at the University of Nottingham Malaysia Campus on an all-expenses-paid scholarship, graduating in 2014 with a BSc in Neuroscience. During his time there, he became president of the Students' Association and was co-founding editor of the student magazine Ignite.

In 2017, Hunte gained a MA in Broadcast Journalism from City, University of London, which he had also attended on a full scholarship. Hunte received an Alumni Laureate Award from the University of Nottingham, and an XCity Award from City University.

== Career ==
Hunte began his career as Google’s youngest strategy manager. Hunte started a YouTube channel and social media presence. After hitting 50,000 subscribers he left Google to become a full-time influencer and trained to be a journalist. Starting at BBC News as an intern, Hunte went on to be a news anchor for BBC News Africa and hosted What's New?, the BBC's first programme and digital service for children. In 2019, Hunte became the BBC's first official LGBT correspondent, reporting for all BBC and BBC News platforms.

In 2020, Hunte took the top spot in The Guardian and Diva magazine's Pride Power List. Hunte was also awarded Journalist of the Year by One Young World, and was a finalist for Specialist Journalist of the Year at the British Journalism Awards, as well as Young Talent of the Year at the Royal Television Society Awards. He then took on the role of the network's West Africa correspondent in March 2021, reporting from across the continent, in places such as Dakar, Senegal.

After working with the BBC for five years, Hunte announced his departure in September 2021 to join Vice News as a Senior Reporter. In May 2022, Ben Hunte was listed on Forbes 30 Under 30 Europe list for media and marketing.

In January 2023, Hunte was promoted to Global Correspondent for VICE News, specialising in LGBTQ lives and human rights.

In June 2023, he received the Foreign Press Award at the Out d'Or ceremony organized by the French Association of LGBTI Journalists for two investigative articles written for Vice News about transphobia in the EHRC.

In October 2024, he became a CNN anchor and correspondent, working in its Atlanta and London offices.

== Personal life ==
Hunte has talked extensively about life as a black gay man and the abuse he receives being in the public eye, as well as his experiences of sexual abuse.

He appeared on the cover of Attitude's 25th anniversary edition in March 2019, and in the Evening Standard's ES Magazine.

Media offices
Preceded by Position created	LGBT Correspondent: BBC News; 2019–March 2021	Vacant
