= Monica Lakhanpaul =

British pediatrician

Monica Lakhanpaul FRCPCH FRSA
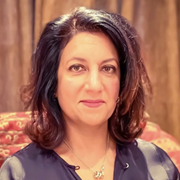
- Born: Leeds, England
- Education: University of Nottingham University of Manchester University of Leicester
- Occupations: Professor of Integrated Community Child Health; Consultant Paediatrician
- Employer(s): UCL Great Ormond Street Institute of Child Health, University College London Nottingham University NHS Trust

Monica Lakhanpaul is a British paediatrician. She is a Honorary Consultant Paediatrician at Nottingham NHS Trust, and Professor of Integrated Community Child Health at University College London (UCL). She was previously Honorary Consultant Paediatrician at Whittington Health NHS Trust and Deputy Theme Lead for Collaborations in Leadership in Applied Health Research and Care – North Thames, and is currently Adjunct Professor at Public Health Foundation India, UCL Global Strategic Academic Advisor (India), National Patient and Public Engagement Lead for the NIHR GOSH Biomedical Research Centre, NIHR National Specialty Lead for Children and Dr. Rinti Banerjee Visiting Chair Professor in the Department of Biosciences and Bioengineering at IIT Bombay.

== Early life and education ==
Lakhanpaul grew up in Leeds. She graduated with a Bachelor of Medicine (distinction; Paediatrics) from the University of Manchester in 1992, and with a Doctor of Medicine from the University of Nottingham in May 2003. Lakhanpaul also gained her Doctorate in paediatrics and child health in 2003.

== Clinical and research career ==
Following on from receiving her doctorate, Lakhanpaul took up simultaneous senior lecturer and consultant paediatrician appointments at the University of Leicester and University Hospitals of Leicester NHS Trust, respectively. In 2012, Lakhanpaul took up her professorship at the UCL GOS Institute of Child Heath, and in 2016 she was appointed head of the Department of Population, Policy and Practice. She continues to practise clinically as a paediatrician in London, and through her Global Strategic Academic Advisor (India) roles, leads on strategy and delivery of partnerships and collaboration between UCL and South Asia and India.

Lakhanpaul's research is multi-disciplinary and translational with particular focus on research programs with a cross-sector, multi-disciplinary, structured and collaborative approach. Her work spans from clinical trials to participatory methods including public engagement and working with the arts and humanities to improve outcomes for vulnerable children, with a focus on the UK and India. She particularly focuses on disability, asthma and nutrition as exemplar public health issues in South Asian families to optimise their health and later risk for non-communicable disease.

Lakhanpaul has been instrumental in establishing the PANChSHEEL study around integrated health, education and environmental intervention to optimise infant feeding practices through school and Anganwadi networks in India and has been widely reported on both in the UK and India. This is a collaboration between University College London, Save the Children, Jawaharlal Nehru University, Delhi, and the Indian Institute of Technology, Delhi.

Lakhanpaul established the Nurture Early for Optimal Nutrition (NEON) study to determine whether transferring health models from resource poor countries and implementing them in deprived localities in the UK could lead to clinically and cost-effective interventions within the NHS. Working with parents and healthcare professionals, Lakhanpaul also established Acutely Sick Child Safety Netting Information Needs (ASK SNIFF) which provides resources to help families with young children understand signs and symptoms of acute illness. It forms part of a larger program of work aiming to develop an intervention package to improve the management of acutely sick children.

She is currently leading the Children in Homeless Accommodations Managing Pandemic Invisibility Or Non-Inclusive Strategies (CHAMPIONS) project based at University College London, in partnership with De Montfort University, The Children's Society, British Association for Community Child Health and others.

Lakhanpaul co-founded the cross-sector Health Education Engineering and Environment (HEEE) Platform, and was Program Director for Children and Young People, UCL Partners Academic Health Sciences Network.

In 2023, Professor Lakhanpaul was named National Patient and Public Engagement Lead for the NIHR GOSH Biomedical Research Centre and, in 2024, she was invited to the South Asian Health Foundation 25th anniversary event at the House of Lords and the launch of their ‘Health Inequalities: Full Stop - The hidden crisis affecting children and families in temporary accommodation in the UK' report which she co-authored. In February 2024, she was invited to become Clinical Advisor to Happy Baby NGO and Barnardo's children's charity and, in July 2024, she became a Churchill Fellow selected by the Winston Churchill Memorial Trust. Later, in September 2024, Lakhanpaul started her role as the NIHR National Specialty Lead for Children and was awarded an Honorary Doctorate of Science (Hon DSc) by De Montfort University for her contributions to child and adolescent health worldwide.

== Awards and recognition ==
- Asian Women of Achievement Award (2010)
- HSJ Patient Safety Award for ‘Spotting the Sick Child’ (Patient Safety in Diagnosis) (2011)
- NICE Fellow
- Founding Clinical Director for the National Collaborating Centre of Women and Children's Health NICE children guidelines
- NIHR National Specialty Lead for Children
- Global Strategic Academic Advisor (India), UCL Vice-Provost (Research, Innovation & Global Engagement)
- Co-Director of the Childhood Infections and Pollution (CHIP) Consortium
- Adjunct Professor of the Public Health Foundation of India (PHFI)
- Member by Distinction of the Faculty of Public Health
- Faculty Member of the Reach Alliance
- Churchill Fellow selected by Winston Churchill Memorial Trust
- National Patient and Public Engagement Lead, NIHR GOSH Biomedical Research Centre
- Clinical Advisor to Happy Baby NGO and Barnardo's children's charity
- NIHR National Specialty Lead for Children
- Honorary Doctorate of Science (Hon DSc) awarded by De Montfort University for contributions to child and adolescent health, 2024
- National B.A.M.E Health and Care Awards 'Ground-breaking Researcher of the Year’ Award 2024
- Highly Commended at the UCL East Engagement Awards 2024.
