= Southern Theological Education and Training Scheme =

STETS (Southern Theological Education and Training Scheme) was a ministerial training scheme for church ministers in southern England, based in Salisbury. Its functions were absorbed by Sarum College, also in Salisbury, in 2015.

== History ==
STETS developed from an earlier non-residential ministerial training scheme called Southern Dioceses Ministerial Training Scheme (SDMTS), founded in 1974 by a group chaired by the Salisbury and Wells Theological College Principal, Reginald Askew. The scheme was based at the college but complementary to it, offering training for self-supporting ordained ministry. SDMTS carried forward the ministerial educational work of Salisbury and Wells Theological College after it closed in 1994 and its premises were transferred to Sarum College, which became an independent ecumenical institution for further education.

SDMTS briefly became STS before being reconstituted in 1997 as the Southern Theological Education and Training Scheme (STETS) by the Church of England, the Methodist Church and the United Reformed Church "to serve the church in the south of England, by providing theological education and training for all its members, ministries and others and facilitating regional cooperation and collaboration."

The first Principal of STETS was Christopher Cocksworth (1997–2001), later Bishop of Coventry and Dean of Windsor. He was followed by Vernon White (2001–2011), later Canon Theologian at Westminster Abbey and visiting professor in the Department of Theology and Religious Studies at King's College, London. The final Principal of STETS was David Holgate (2011–2014), later Sub-Dean and Canon for Theology and Ministry at Manchester Cathedral.

== Successor ==
STETS closed in February 2015, after its initial ministerial and lay training programmes were integrated with those of Sarum College.

Training for ordination and lay ministry is now being run by the college's Centre for Formation in Ministry, which includes a rural ministry training pathway.
