= Perseus Mlambo =

Zimbabwean Entrepreneur

- Born: 1988; Zimbabwe
- Education: University of Leeds, University of Nottingham
- Occupation: Business executive
- Known for: Fintech
- Notable work: Founder at Zazu, Union54, and ChitChat

Perseus Mlambo (born 1988) is a Zimbabwean-born fintech entrepreneur based in Zambia. He is the founder of Zazu, a neobank focused on financial literacy founded in 2015, and co-founder of Union54, a card-issuing API for African fintechs founded in 2021. In 2023, he co-founded ChitChat, a messaging app with built-in payments and virtual cards. Mlambo was named to the Forbes Africa 30 Under 30 list in 2018.

== Early life and education ==
Mlambo was born in Zimbabwe. He pursued his higher education in the United Kingdom, studying Law and Psychology at the University of Nottingham and started a 2-Year master’s degree in social work from Leeds Beckett University, dropping out after Year 1.

== Career ==
In his early career Mlambo worked on a DfID project in El Salvador addressing environmental issues affecting farmers’ livelihoods and with the UN Refugee Agency (UNHCR) in Geneva. At the end of his time at UNHCR, he returned to Africa.

In 2015, he co-founded Zazu, initially an agritech platform in Zambia that later pivoted into a neobank focused on digital financial services and financial literacy. In 2021, Mlambo's team launched Union54, a card-issuing API platform that allowed African fintech companies to issue debit cards without banks. Mlambo received praise from Zambian President Hakainde Hichilema saying We are proud to see more young people dreaming big and taking charge. As reported, Union54 became the first Zambian startup accepted into Y Combinator and raised $15 million from investors led by Tiger Global. In July 2022, Union54 temporarily suspended card operations following a massive $1.2 billion attempted chargeback fraud.

In 2023, Union54 introduced ChitChat, a messaging and payments app. Often referred to as “WeChat for Africa,” ChitChat integrates chat, payments, and digital commerce in one platform. In 2024, Union54 partnered with Paymentology, a London-based issuer-processor to expand ChitChat’s reach across Africa.

Mlambo also co-founded the Zambia Technology Sector Working Group with Mwiya Musokotwane, a group aimed at promoting Zambia as a hub for African tech startups, advocating for reforms in immigration, tax, and crypto policy. In 2019, the group hosted Ethereum co-founder Vitalik Buterin in Zambia.

== Attempted chargeback fraud ==
In July 2022, Union54 faced a coordinated chargeback fraud scheme involving over $1.2 billion in attempted fraudulent transactions. The fraud exploited vulnerabilities in the Mastercard dispute process, allowing bad actors to initiate chargebacks without having made legitimate purchases. The company temporarily suspended its card operations following an incident.

Mlambo addressed the crisis publicly, he advocated for regulatory clarity and better collaboration between African startups and global payment networks. Union54 underwent months of internal audits and system redesigns before returning with a renewed focus on embedded financial tools.

== Recognition ==
- 2018: Mlambo Listed on Forbes Africa 30 Under 30.
- 2022 and 2024: Listed on Choiseul 100 Africa.
