= Robert Wood (psychologist) =

British psychologist and writer

Robert Wood is a British psychologist and writer.

== Biography ==
Robert Wood was born on 10 March 1941 in Gosforth, Newcastle upon Tyne. Born to an English father and a Welsh mother, Wood was raised in Sunderland. After a grammar school education, Wood attended the University of Nottingham in September 1959 where he studied Mathematics and Statistics. On graduating, Wood began training to be an actuary and worked for short spells as a supply teacher, and statistician with Tate & Lyle. In the autumn of 1964 Wood secured a post at the National Foundation for Educational Research where he conducted the first study of a new area called item banking. This study resulted in his first book Item Banking. Wood then went on to study at the University of Chicago, having received a fellowship, and was awarded a PhD in 1971.

Wood returned to the UK in July 1971, and took up the position of director of research at the University of London School Examinations Department. It was here that, among other things, Wood organised the 1979 conference Rehabilitating psychometrics for the Social Science Research Council. In 1980, Wood was seconded to direct the Evaluation of Testing in Schools Project at the Institute of Education, and the University of London. The following year Wood moved to Jamaica where he served as Professor of Educational Measurement in the University of the West Indies. In early 1984, Wood took up a Fellowship at Flinders University in Australia. Later in the year, Wood was appointed director of the New Zealand Council for Educational Research, but declined to take up post citing personal reasons.

Having become an associate of the British Psychological Society during the 1970s, Wood was in a position to start a new career in England as a business psychologist. In 1985 Wood helped to establish a consultancy called Psychometric Research & Development Ltd with an office in St Albans. Wood was made a Fellow of the British Psychological Society in 1986 and for the academic year 1987–88 he was visiting professor at the London Institute. In 1990 he joined Pearn Kandola Occupational Psychologists in Oxford and remained there until early 2000. From 1998 to 2005 Wood was a special professor in the School of Education at the University of Nottingham. In 1998 the same university conferred on him the degree of DLitt in recognition of over 120 published books, monographs and articles.

Concerning his memoir Mackem Mayhem (2004), a review in the Sunderland Echo (29 April 2005) said: "As a work of literature it is a gem." There followed the three novels comprising the Moving Deckchairs trilogy. Eight of his short stories have received commendations in various competitions. He has since written walking books: the first appeared in 2009, the second in 2010 and the third and fourth in 2011.

== Selected works ==
=== Professional books ===
- Wood, Robert (with L S Skurnik); Item Banking; Windsor: NFER-Nelson, 1969 (Paperback, ISBN 978-0-901225-10-8)
- Wood, Robert; Measurement and Assessment in Education and Psychology: Collected Papers 1967-87; Lewes: Falmer Press, 1987 (Paperback, ISBN 978-1-85000-162-1)
- Wood, Robert; Assessment and Testing: A Survey of Research Commissioned by the University of Cambridge Local Examinations Syndicate, Cambridge: Cambridge University Press, 1991 (Paperback, ISBN 978-0-521-44997-7)
- Wood, Robert (with T Payne); Competency-based Recruitment and Selection, Chichester: John Wiley & Sons, 1998 (Paperback, ISBN 978-0-471-97473-4)
- Wood, Robert (with H Tolley); Test Your Emotional Intelligence, London: Kogan Page Ltd, 2003 (Paperback, ISBN 978-0-7494-3732-9)
- Wood, Robert (with H Tolley); How to Succeed at an Assessment Centre 3rd Edn, Kogan Page, London, 2011 (Paperback, ISBN 9780749462291

=== Other books ===
- Wood, Robert; Mackem Mayhem; Leicester: Matador, 2004 (Paperback, ISBN 978-1-904744-60-3)
- Wood, Robert; Pushing Envelopes, Leicester: Matador, 2005 (Paperback, ISBN 978-1-905237-02-9)
- Wood, Robert; Chekyll and Ide, Leicester: Matador, 2006 (Paperback, ISBN 978-1-905886-20-3)
- Wood, Robert; Ten a Penny, Leicester: Matador, 2007 (Paperback, ISBN 978-1-906221-28-7)
- Wood, Robert; Walks into History: Hampshire, Newbury: Countryside Books, 2009 (Paperback, ISBN 978-1-84674-139-5)
- Wood, Robert; A Boot Up the Berkshire Downs, Wellington, Somerset: PIXZ Books, 2010 (Hardback, ISBN 978-1-906887-71-1)
- Wood, Robert; A Boot Up the North Hampshire Downs, Wellington, Somerset: PIXZ Books, 2011 (Hardback, ISBN 978-0857100245
- Wood, Robert; A Boot Up the Chilterns, Wellington, Somerset: PIXZ Books, 2011 (Hardback, ISBN 978-0-85710-046-7)
