= Vernon White (theologian) =

English Anglican priest and theological scholar

Vernon Philip White (born 1953) is an English Anglican priest and theological scholar.

== Biography ==
White was born in south-east London in 1953 and attended Eltham College. After leaving school he spent a year undertaking Voluntary Service Overseas in Africa. He was educated at Clare College, Cambridge (graduating BA in English and Theology 1975, MA 1979) and Oriel College, Oxford (MLitt 1980). He prepared for ordination at Wycliffe Hall, Oxford. He was ordained deacon in 1977 and priest in 1978 in the Church of England. He was a tutor in doctrine and ethics at Wycliffe Hall from 1977 to 1983, then Chaplain and Lecturer at the University of Exeter from 1983 to 1987. He then became jointly Director of Ordinands for the Diocese of Guildford and Rector of Wotton and Holmbury St Mary in Surrey (1987–93). From 1993 until 2001 he was Canon Chancellor of Lincoln Cathedral and also a special lecturer at the University of Nottingham, becoming Principal of the Southern Theological Education and Training Scheme in 2001 and Canon Theologian of Winchester Cathedral in 2006. In 2011 he was appointed Canon Theologian at Westminster Abbey and visiting professor in the Department of Theology and Religious Studies at King's College, London. In March 2018 it was announced that White was to step down from his role in the Abbey to focus more on writing.

== Impact ==
White's book Atonement and Incarnation: an essay in universalism and particularity was studied in Eamonn Mulcahy's The Cause of Our Salvation: Soteriological Causality according to some Modern British Theologians, 1988-98 (Tesi Gregoriana Serie Teologia 140, Rome: Editrice Pontificia Università Gregoriana, 2007), alongside Paul Fiddes, The Creative Suffering of God (Oxford: Clarendon Press, 1988), Colin Gunton, The Actuality of Atonement: a Study of Metaphor, Rationality and the Christian Tradition (Edinburgh: T. & T. Clark, 1988), and John McIntyre, The Shape of Soteriology: Studies in the Doctrine of the Death of Christ (Edinburgh: T. & T. Clark, 1992).

== Publications ==
- 1981: Honest to Goodness: moral experience and the existence of God (Grove booklet on ethics 40). Bramcote: Grove Books
- 1985: The Fall of a Sparrow: a concept of special divine action. Exeter: Paternoster Press
- 1991: Atonement and Incarnation: an essay in universalism and particularity. Cambridge: Cambridge University Press
- 1996: Paying Attention to People: an essay on individualism and Christian belief. London: SPCK
- 2000: "Re-enchanting the World: a fresh look at the God of mystical theology." Theology
- 2000: 'The Future of Theology' in Calling Time. Religion and Change at the turn of the Millennium, ed. M.Percy, Sheffield: Sheffield Academic Press
- 2002: Identity (Society and Church) London: SCM
- 2005: Counterpoints: believing Christian faith in a difficult world. Salisbury: Sarum College Press
- 2006: Life Beyond Death: threads of hope in faith, life and theology (Sarum Theological Lectures.) London: Darton, Longman and Todd
- 2010: "Providence, Irony and Belief". Theology
- 2015: Purpose and Providence. Taking Soundings in Western Thought, Literature and Theology, London: Bloomsbury/T&T Clark
- 2017: 'Idealism and Compromise' & 'Stability' in The Moral Heart of Public Service ed. Foster-Gilbert, London: Jessica Kingsley
- 2019: 'Integrity and the Individual' in Integrity in Public Life ed. Foster-Gilbert, London: Haus
- 2020: 'Truth Pursued' in Truth in Public Life ed. Foster-Gilbert, London: Haus
- 2023: 'Providence' in T&T Clark Handbook of Suffering and the Problem of Evil ed. M.Grebe & J. Grossl, London: T&T Clark
- 2023: Meaning, Mattering, Transcendence. Essays on Meaning, Morality, and God. Oregon: Cascade/WIPF and STOCK

== Sources ==
- Crockford's Clerical Directory, s.v. 'White, Vernon Philip'
- Oxford University library catalogue
- Homepage at STETS
