= William Henry Revis =

British businessman and philanthropist

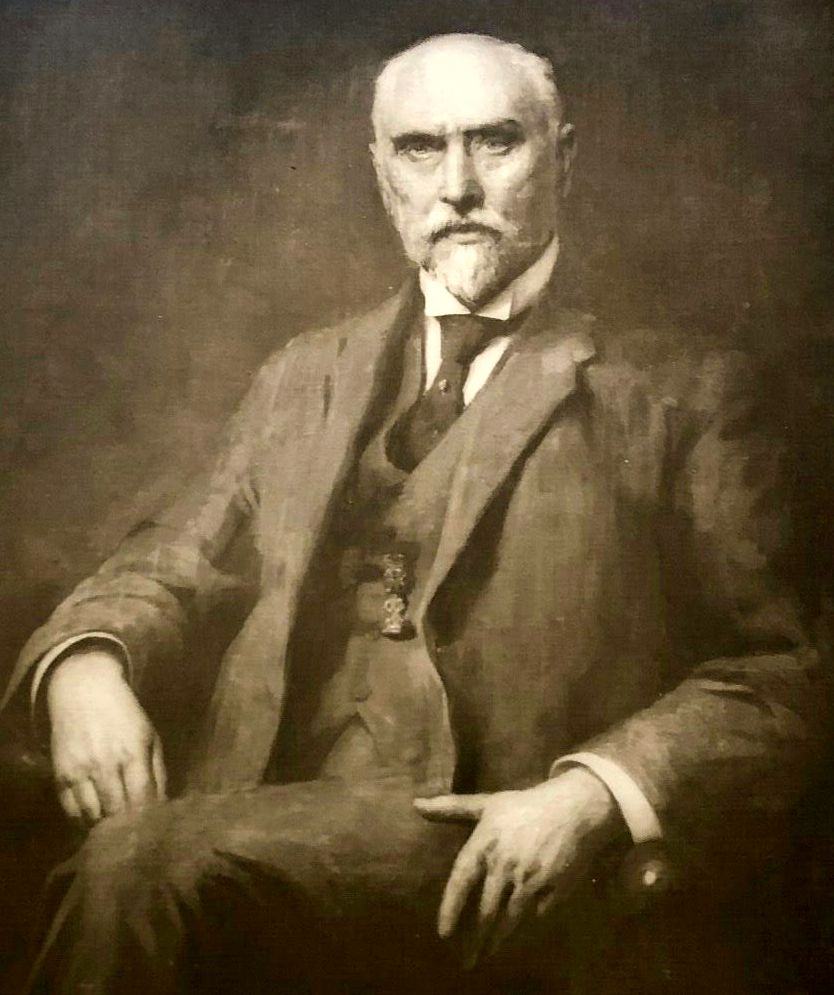
- Born: 1849; Nottingham, England
- Died: 1923 (aged 73–74)
- Education: Nottingham High School
- Occupations: Lace manufacturer, tile exporter
- Children: William A. Revis, Anne Francis Revis
- Parent(s): William Revis and Sarah Rimmington Revis

William Henry Revis was a British lace and hosiery manufacturer and benefactor of Nottingham University College. He was one of the founders of the Nottingham Reds, now the oldest football league team and known as Nottingham Forest F.C., and scored its first goal in league play.

Revis was born in Nottingham in 1849 and educated at Nottingham High School, which had been founded in 1513 when King Henry VIII sealed the school's foundation deed. In the fall of 1865, he was one of a team of shinty (or shinney) players who met at the Clinton Arms on Shakespeare Street in Nottingham and founded the Nottingham Reds, now the oldest football league team. On April 23, 1870, when the team played their first game in league play, Revis scored the first goal and was steward of the club with John Lymberry. On that day, he also won the prize for kicking a football furthest with a kick of 161 feet 7 inches.

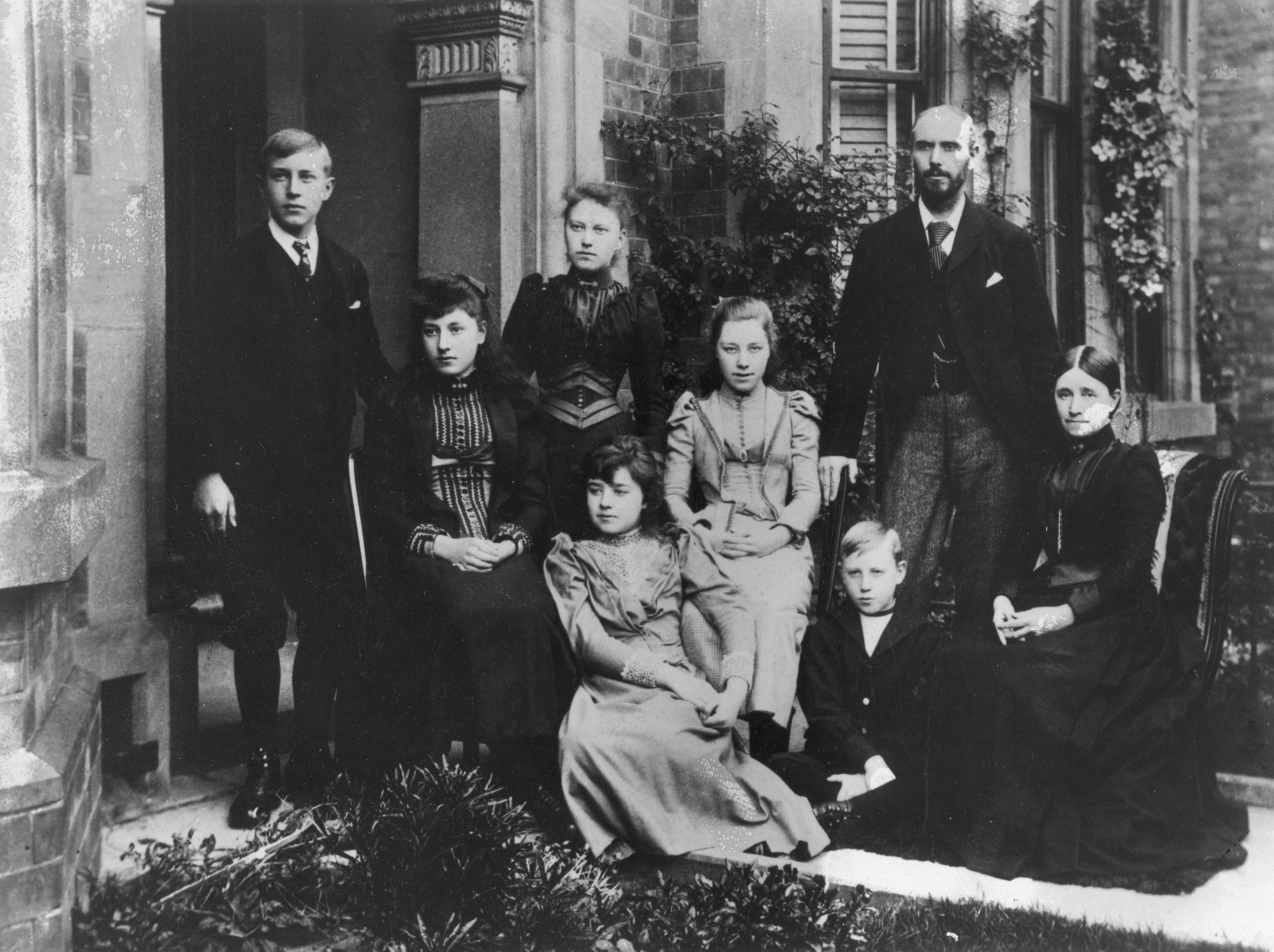
William H. Revis and family ca. 1891.

Revis went to work in the lace industry and founded a business on Wollaton Street in Nottingham. Following a successful career in the lace industry, he emigrated to America in 1899 and spent fifteen years in New York importing tile and other building materials. In 1914 he returned to England, settling in Weston-super-Mare where he lived until his death in 1923.

Revis left a total bequest of almost £48,000 to Nottingham University College, the second most significant donation in its history. The Revis Trust is still used to fund scholarships, grants and loans for poor students "of pregnant parts and laudable inclination by whom a full education cannot be reached without considerable money help," as Revis stipulated. As of 2020, the WH Revis Article 26 Scholarships provide funds for applicants seeking asylum in the UK consisting of the full international fee plus £500 per year towards living costs.
