= F. B. Hinsley =

British mining engineer

Frederick Baden Hinsley (1900–1988) was a British mining engineer.

== Biography ==
Hinsley left school at the age of 13 and worked in Desford Colliery near Leicester. Encouraged by his mother, he studied at night school and was eventually admitted to study engineering at Birmingham University in 1920. On graduation, he worked in the mining industry, initially in Staffordshire before returning to academia. He worked at Cardiff University and then founded the School of Mining Engineering at the University of Nottingham. He stayed at Nottingham until retirement and remained actively involved as emeritus professor there. His specific area of expertise was mine ventilation (including historical aspects) and for which his expertise was much in demand around the world. Hinsley became a founding fellow of the Fellowship of Engineering (now the Royal Academy of Engineering) in 1976.

The Institute of Materials, Minerals and Mining awarded him the Sir Andrew Bryan award in 1982/3 for outstanding and sustained contribution to the institute.
